= Uncle Fred in the Springtime =

1939 novel by P. G. Wodehouse

- First edition (US)
- Author: P. G. Wodehouse
- Language: English
- Genre: Comic novel
- Publisher: Doubleday, Doran (US); Herbert Jenkins (UK)
- Publication date: 18 August 1939 (US); 25 August 1939 (UK)
- Publication place: United States
- Media type: Print (hardback & paperback)
- ISBN: 978-0-09-951384-1
- Preceded by: "The Crime Wave at Blandings" (short), Heavy Weather (novel)
- Followed by: Full Moon (Blandings), Uncle Dynamite (Uncle Fred)

Uncle Fred in the Springtime is a novel by P. G. Wodehouse, first published in the United States on 18 August 1939 by Doubleday, Doran, New York, and in the United Kingdom on 25 August 1939 by Herbert Jenkins, London.

It is set at the idyllic Blandings Castle, home of Clarence, Earl of Emsworth, the fifth full-length novel to be set there. It also features Uncle Fred, who first appeared in the short story "Uncle Fred Flits By", which was included in the 1936 collection Young Men in Spats, and would feature in three further novels.

== Plot summary ==
In London, Pongo Twistleton is having money troubles, and his wealthy friend Horace Pendlebury-Davenport is in trouble with his fiancée, Pongo's sister Valerie, for hiring Claude "Mustard" Pott to trail her during the Drones Club weekend at Le Touquet. Horace having refused to loan him money, Pongo resolves to call on his Uncle Fred, 5th Earl of Ickenham, for assistance. Meanwhile, at Blandings, Horace's uncle Alaric, Duke of Dunstable, as well as demanding eggs to throw at anyone whistling "The Bonnie Banks o' Loch Lomond", has taken it into his head that Lord Emsworth's prized pig, the Empress of Blandings, needs some fitness training. In the absence of his trusty brother Galahad, Emsworth calls on Gally's old friend Ickenham for assistance in stopping the Duke from stealing the pig.

Horace, having fallen out with his cousin Ricky Gilpin over Gilpin's fiancée Polly Pott, daughter of Mustard, inadvertently makes trouble for Pongo by being dressed as a Zulu rather than a Boy Scout during a round of the "Clothes Stakes", run by Pott at the Drones. Pongo's mistaken bet loses all his money, adding to his already large debt. Uncle Fred ponders how to get Polly into Blandings to court her prospective uncle-in-law; Fred thinks the Duke will like her and ignore her background if they meet in a neutral situation. Emsworth creates an opening by insulting Sir Roderick Glossop by calling him a name from their school days, Pimples; Glossop then refuses to come to Blandings to analyse the increasingly loopy Duke of Dunstable, as Emsworth's sister Lady Constance has requested.

Fred heads to Blandings posing as Glossop, with Pongo playing the role of his secretary and nephew, and Polly his daughter Gwendoline. They unexpectedly meet Glossop on the train, who had later been persuaded by Constance to come despite the insult. Fred tells Glossop the Duke is on the train and Glossop can save time by talking with him, and then heading back to London. Fred is not aware that the stranger is Rupert Baxter, now working for the Duke. Arriving at Blandings, they are met by Lord Bosham, who was conned out of his wallet by Uncle Fred the previous day.

Baxter is sacked by the Duke because he was seen at a ball in London by Horace, but is taken on again when Fred, as Glossop, persuades Horace and the Duke that Horace is suffering delusions. Horace heads off for a rest-cure, and Baxter is left unable to reveal that he has seen through Fred's disguise, having met the real Glossop before. Baxter is put on his guard, and informs Constance; she in turn wants to hire a detective to deal with these imposters. Bosham remembers Mustard Pott, and calls him to Blandings.

Dunstable's scheme to acquire the pig continues apace, and he calls in his strapping nephew to help, but when Gilpin asks for funds to buy an onion soup bar, thus enabling him to marry Polly, the two row and part. Dunstable ropes in Baxter instead. Uncle Fred, meeting Pott just after he has won £250 from Bosham at "Persian Monarchs", takes the money off him, insisting it will help Polly marry wealthy Horace. Pott, meeting Gilpin at The Emsworth Arms, tells him about Polly being engaged to Horace, and the enraged Gilpin chases a fearful Horace back to the Castle. Fred gives the money to Pongo to pass on to Polly for Gilpin's benefit, but Gilpin spurns her and Pongo uses the returned cash to pay off his debts.

When Fred reconciles Gilpin and Pongo, another £250 is required. Pott is persuaded to take it from Dunstable at "Persian Monarchs", but the wily peer wins himself £300. Both Fred and Pott try to get it back, but Dunstable has the pig, captured earlier by Baxter, hidden in his bathroom, and is keeping his room under lock and key. Having knocked out the vigilant Baxter with a Mickey Finn, Fred finally gains access to the room shortly after Pott has done the same, Pongo having lured Dunstable away with a rendition of "The Bonnie Banks". Fred is caught by a shotgun-bearing Bosham, just as Pott, having discovered the Empress in the bathroom, drinks a second Mickey destined for Dunstable. Bosham locks Fred in a cupboard.

Valerie arrives, reunited with Horace and hot for vengeance on the uncle that made him think himself insane, and confirms Fred's identity; Fred convinces all that Emsworth has become infatuated with Polly, and that he is there to put a stop to it. He takes Dunstable's roll of cash under the pretext of paying Polly off—insisting that his visit remain a secret from Lady Ickenham to maintain the family dignity—and heads back to London with not only the money for Gilpin's soup bar, but an extra fifty quid for himself to blow on a few joyous weeks in the city.

== Characters ==
- Lord Emsworth, absent-minded master of Blandings Castle
  - George Threepwood, Lord Bosham, Emsworth's eldest son
  - Lady Constance Keeble, Emsworth's domineering sister
  - Empress of Blandings, Emsworth's cherished prize pig
- Alaric, Duke of Dunstable, a cantankerous peer
  - Rupert Baxter, Dunstable's secretary, formerly employed by Lord Emsworth
  - Horace Pendlebury-Davenport, Dunstable's nephew
  - Ricky Gilpin, another nephew of Dunstable, a poet
    - Polly Pott, Ricky's fiancée and Horace's dance-teacher
      - Claude "Mustard" Pott, Polly's father, a detective
- Pongo Twistleton, an impoverished friend of Horace
  - Valerie Twistleton, Pongo's sister, engaged to Horace
  - Frederick Twistleton, 5th Earl of Ickenham, Pongo and Valerie's Uncle Fred
- Sir Roderick Glossop, a prominent nerve-specialist
- Beach, butler at the castle

== Style ==
According to Robert A. Hall Jr., the proportion of dialogue to narrative prose increased in Wodehouse's work over time, beginning in the 1920s, after he had started his intensive involvement with the theatre. In Wodehouse's 1904 novel The Gold Bat, the first six chapters (over 10,000 words) contain 42 percent dialogue and 58 percent narrative, whereas in Uncle Fred in the Springtime, which Hall considered representative of Wodehouse's mature humour, the first three chapters (also over 10,000 words) contain 67 percent dialogue and only 33 percent narrative. In Wodehouse's mature style, longer narrative passages usually set the stage for conversational exchanges, while shorter narrative passages often describe actions which, in a theatrical performance, would be directly visible to the audience. However, Wodehouse also uses these narrative passages to make more detailed humorous comments about the dialogue and characters than would be possible in a play when staged.

Wodehouse generally uses conservative verbal inflection in his narrative prose and dialogue, but occasionally contrasts this with an informal verbal inflection in conversation, such as when Lord Bosham and Lady Constance discuss the Duke of Dunstable's accident in chapter 12:

"It's true, is it, that the old bird has bust a flipper?"
"He has wrenched his shoulder most painfully," assented Lady Constance, with a happier choice of phrase.

Where there is a difference between British and American usage of syntax, Wodehouse often follows the British pattern. While American English uses the simple form of a verb in subjunctive clauses (after verbs referring to desire, necessity, and the like), British English uses the inflected form wherever it is available. For example, in chapter 7, Lord Ickenham says: "It is essential [...] that Polly goes to Blandings and there meets and fascinates Dunstable." In American usage, this would be It is essential that Polly go, meet, and fascinate.

Commercial products, patent medicines, and other items often have comical names in Wodehouse's stories. For example, in imitation of the names of swords like Excalibur and Durendal, Lord Ickenham's great bath-sponge is called Joyeuse.

Exaggerated synonyms are used in Wodehouse's stories to vary the dialogue in humorous ways, such as when a character speaks of squashing in with the domestic staff (chapter 8).

== Publication history ==
The story was first published as a serial in The Saturday Evening Post from 22 April to 27 May 1939, illustrated by James Williamson.

The first US edition dust jacket was illustrated by Peggy Bacon. The first UK edition dust jacket was illustrated by Fenwick.

== Reception ==
Wodehouse biographer Richard Usborne wrote, "Uncle Fred Ickenham is in his element. He brings the right couples together and a proper redistribution of other people's wealth. A masterly mix-up, suavely sorted out."

== Adaptations ==
The novel was adapted as a radio drama by Archie Scottney in 2012 for BBC Radio 4, directed by Martin Jarvis, who also portrayed Lord Emsworth. The cast also included Ian Ogilvy as the narrator, Patricia Hodge as Lady Constance, and Alfred Molina as Uncle Fred. The radio drama first aired in two parts on 22 April and 29 April 2012.

Scenes from the novel were adapted in the first episode of the second series of the Blandings television series, "Throwing Eggs", which first aired on 16 February 2014.

== See also ==
Uncle Fred would return in:

- Uncle Dynamite (1948)
- Cocktail Time (1958)
- Service with a Smile (1961) – in which he and Dunstable revisit Blandings
