= A Pelican at Blandings =

1969 novel by P. G. Wodehouse

- First edition (UK)
- Author: P. G. Wodehouse
- Language: English
- Publisher: Barrie & Jenkins (UK); Simon & Schuster (US)
- Publication date: 25 September 1969; 11 February 1970
- Publication place: United Kingdom
- Media type: Print (hardback & paperback)
- Preceded by: Galahad at Blandings (novel), "Sticky Wicket at Blandings" (short story)
- Followed by: Sunset at Blandings

A Pelican at Blandings is a novel by P. G. Wodehouse, first published in the United Kingdom on 25 September 1969 by Barrie & Jenkins, London, and in the United States on 11 February 1970 by Simon & Schuster, Inc., New York, under the title No Nudes Is Good Nudes.

It is the tenth full-length novel in the Blandings Castle saga and the last one fully completed by Wodehouse. The title refers to Galahad Threepwood, a survivor of the Pelican Club.

== Plot introduction ==
Blandings Castle lacks its usual balm for the Earl of Emsworth, as his stern sister Lady Constance Keeble is once more in residence. The Duke of Dunstable is also infesting the place again, along with the standard quota of American millionaires, romantic youths, con artists, imposters and so on. With a painting of a reclining nude at the centre of numerous intrigues, Gally's genius is once again required to sort things out.

== Plot summary ==
Lord Emsworth is in clover at Blandings, with the only guest, Howard Chesney, easily avoided by eating alone in the library. His peace is shattered by the arrival of his sister Connie, along with a friend she has met on the boat over from America, Vanessa Polk, and the news that Dunstable is soon to descend upon the castle adds to his misery. Desperate, he calls on his brother Gally for aid.

Gally is in London, meeting his godson Johnny Halliday, who announces his engagement to Dunstable's niece Linda. He hurries to the castle, sharing a train carriage with Dunstable, who tells Gally how he has bought a painting of a reclining nude, having heard how anxious the wealthy Wilbur Trout is to buy it; Dunstable plans to bring Trout to Blandings to sell him the picture at a large profit.

At the castle, Connie urges Dunstable to cosy up with Vanessa Polk, her father's wealth proving an easy lure, and Emsworth's woes are compounded by his beloved Empress' refusal to eat a potato. Gally hears from Linda that her engagement to Halliday is no more, and Halliday himself visits, to explain the incident, a grilling he was obliged to give Linda as a witness in a court case he was defending, which led to their split. He begs Gally to invite him to the castle, but Gally, explaining his position in Connie's bad books, sends him home, promising to do his best on his behalf.

Wilbur Trout arrives, and we learn that Vanessa Polk was once engaged to him, and still harbours tender feelings. He tells her the tale of Dunstable's treachery, and she hatches a plan to steal the painting. In London, Halliday hears from his partner Joe Bender that the painting sold to Dunstable was a fake, and he calls in Gally's help. The capable old Pelican arranges to swap the real picture for the fake, but decides to take a bath before replacing the original in the empty frame.

Emsworth, visiting his pig after a worrying dream, falls into the muddy sty, then finds himself locked out, Gally having turned the key on his return from meeting Johnny. He enters the house via Dunstable's rooms, waking up the Duke when surprised by a cat, and later returns to wake the Duke again when he sees the empty frame. When the rest of the household see the picture, now replaced by Gally, the Duke's low opinion of Emsworth's sanity persuades him to call in psychiatric help; Gally recommends Johnny, who he pretends is Sir Roderick Glossop's junior partner.

Vanessa Polk, having spotted him for a crook, persuades Chesney to help her steal the painting, but he recognises Halliday, newly arrived at the castle, as the attorney who defended him after an earlier crime went wrong. He plans to leave to avoid being unmasked and return by night for the painting, but seeing Halliday at the top of the stairs, pushes him down. Halliday falls, taking Dunstable with him, and while he angers the Duke he endears himself to Linda, who finds herself kissing his face as he lies prone in the hallway. Linda, now firmly in favour of Halliday, reveals she cannot marry without Dunstable's consent, which he refuses after the stairs incident, and also having recalled Halliday's father, who he never got on with.

Connie calls Glossop's office, finds Halliday is an imposter and ejects him from the castle. Trout and Vanessa meet up in the night to steal the painting, but Chesney fails to turn up, having crashed his car on the way. The two realise they love each other, and leave next morning to get married. Connie insists that Dunstable write to Vanessa proposing marriage; but the letter is intercepted by Gally, who shares with Dunstable his knowledge that Vanessa is not really an heiress, and makes the Duke allow the wedding of Linda and Johnny in exchange for the return of his letter, under threat of a breach of promise suit if it were to reach Vanessa. Connie is recalled to America by her husband, and the Duke returns home, leaving Emsworth once again master of his domain.

== Characters ==
- The Earl of Emsworth, the absent-minded master of Blandings
  - The Hon. Galahad Threepwood, Emsworth's dashing brother
  - Lady Constance Keeble, Emsworth's domineering sister
  - Empress of Blandings, Emsworth's prize pig
- Alaric, Duke of Dunstable, a cantankerous peer
  - Linda Gilpin, the Duke's attractive niece
- John Halliday, a barrister, godson of Gally
  - Ma Balsam, Halliday's voluble landlady
  - Joe Bender, proprietor of a London art gallery, Halliday's business partner
- Wilbur Trout, a much-married American millionaire
- Vanessa Polk, a charming and resourceful young girl, once engaged to Trout
- Howard Chesney, a rather suspicious visitor to the castle
- Beach, butler at the castle

== Publication history ==
The illustration on the first UK edition dust jacket was drawn by Osbert Lancaster, and the photograph of Wodehouse on the back panel of the dust jacket was by Tom Blau, Camera Press. The first US edition dust jacket was illustrated by Barry Zaid.

== Reception ==
Wodehouse biographer Richard Usborne wrote, "Wodehouse was eighty-eight when this book was published. The writing is now thin and tediously stretched in places. The ribs of the plot often stare out gauntly with too little flesh on them... But there are some lovely plums in the duff still."

== See also ==
Dunstable previously visited the castle in Uncle Fred in the Springtime (1939) and Service With a Smile (1962).
