= List of P. G. Wodehouse characters =

The following is an incomplete list of fictional characters featured in the books and stories of P. G. Wodehouse, by series, in alphabetical order by series name. Due to overlap between the various classifications of Wodehouse's work, some characters appear more than once.

== Blandings Castle ==
=== Threepwood family ===
- Clarence Threepwood, 9th Earl of Emsworth

==== Emsworth's siblings and their families ====
- The Hon. Galahad Threepwood, Emsworth's unmarried younger brother
- The Hon. Lancelot Threepwood, Emsworth's deceased brother
  - Millicent Threepwood, his daughter
- Lady Ann Warblington, Emsworth's sister, sometime châtelaine at Blandings
- Jane, deceased sister of Emsworth
  - Angela, daughter of Jane, Emsworth's niece
- Lady Constance Keeble, later Schoonmaker, Emsworth's bossiest sister
  - Joseph Keeble, her first husband, Phyllis Jackson's stepfather.
    - Phyllis Jackson, Joe Keeble's stepdaughter
      - Michael "Mike" Jackson, her husband, an old friend of Psmith
  - James Schoonmaker, Lady Constance's second husband, an American millionaire and an old friend of Uncle Fred
    - Myra Schoonmaker, his daughter who marries Bill Bailey despite Lady Constance's best efforts
- Lady Charlotte, Emsworth's sister, "a tougher egg even than Lady Constance, or her younger sister, Lady Julia".
  - Jane, her daughter
- Lady Julia Fish, Emsworth's younger sister, who though formidable has a sense of humour and, according to Galahad, "the seeds of greatness" in her.
  - Maj. Gen. Sir Miles Fish, her late husband
    - Ronnie Fish, their son and a member of the Drones Club
- Lady Florence Moresby, another of Emsworth's domineering sisters
  - J. J. Underwood, Lady Florence's deceased first husband
  - Kevin Moresby, her second husband, from whom she has separated
- Dora, Lady Garland, Emsworth's tall and stately sister
  - Sir Everard Garland, K.C.B., her late husband
  - Prudence Garland, Lady Dora's daughter
- Lady Hermione Wedge, Emsworth's sister, who looks like a cook
  - Colonel Egbert Wedge, Lady Hermione's husband
  - Veronica Wedge, the Wedges' beautiful but simple daughter
- Georgiana, Lady Alcester, another sister of Lord Emsworth, who owns fourteen dogs
  - Gertrude Alcester, her daughter
- Lady Diana Phipps, the only one of Emsworth's sisters whom Galahad likes
- Wilfred Allsop, Lord Emsworth's nephew, whose parentage is not mentioned (possibly a nephew by marriage)

==== Emsworth's children and their families ====
- George Threepwood, Viscount Bosham, Emsworth's elder son and heir to the earldom
  - Cecily Threepwood, Lord Bosham's wife
    - James Threepwood, their elder son
    - George Threepwood, their second son
- The Hon. Freddie Threepwood, Emsworth's younger son
  - Niagara "Aggie" Donaldson, Freddie's wife; niece of Angus McAllister
    - Penelope Donaldson, Aggie's younger sister
      - Mr Donaldson, dog-biscuit king, father of Aggie and Penelope
- Lady Mildred Mant, Emsworth's eldest daughter
  - Colonel Horace Mant, her husband

==== Distant relations ====
- Percy, Lord Stockheath, Emsworth's nephew, whose parents are never named
  - Algernon Wooster, Lord Stockheath's cousin, implying Bertie Wooster may be a relation too
- The Bishop of Godalming, a relative of the Threepwoods
- Mrs Jack Hale, mentioned as belonging to the collateral branch of the family (Something Fresh)
- The 8th Earl of Emsworth - Clarence's father (Company for Gertrude; page 95)
- Robert - uncle of Clarence (Company for Gertrude; page 96)
- Claude - cousin of Clarence (Company for Gertrude; page 96)
- Alistair - maternal uncle of Clarence (Company for Gertrude; page 96)

=== Domestic staff ===
==== Secretaries ====
- Rupert Baxter, Lord Emsworth's original, very efficient secretary
- Montague "Monty" Bodkin, also Emsworth's secretary for a time
- Lavender Briggs, a tall and haughty secretary
- Alexandra "Sandy" Callender, an attractive but fiery red-headed secretary
- Hugo Carmody, another secretary, and a friend of Ronnie Fish
- Rupert Psmith, Baxter's replacement as secretary
- Gerald Anstruther Vail, a thriller-writer, and briefly Emsworth's secretary
- Eve Halliday, hired to catalogue the library

==== House staff ====
- Sebastian Beach, butler
  - Maudie, his much-married niece
- Mrs Twemlow, housekeeper
- Merridew, an under-butler
- James and Alfred, Thomas and Stokes, Charles and Henry, footmen at the Castle

==== Outdoor staff ====
- Thorne, the Scottish Head Gardener in Something Fresh
- Angus McAllister, the Scottish Head Gardener after Thorne
- Slingsby, a chauffeur
- Alfred Voules, another chauffeur

==== Pig staff ====
- George Cyril Wellbeloved, Emsworth's first pig man, who defects to the Parsloe-Parsloe camp
- James Pirbright, another pig man, Wellbeloved's replacement
- Edwin Pott, the pig man in Full Moon
- Monica Simmons, a pig girl of Amazonian proportions

=== Other characters ===
- Empress of Blandings, Lord Emsworth's beloved black Berkshire sow
- Sir Gregory Parsloe-Parsloe, Bart., neighbour and rival of Lord Emsworth
  - Herbert Binstead, Parsloe's butler
  - The Pride of Matchingham, Parsloe-Parsloe's pig
  - The Queen of Matchingham, another pig owned by Parsloe-Parsloe
- James Bartholomew Belford, a farmer, whom Angela loves
- Major Wilfred "Plug" Basham, an old friend of Galahad and feature of his stories
- Admiral George J. "Fruity" Biffen, another old friend of Galahad
- The Rev. Rupert "Beefy" Bingham, Freddie's university pal
- "Puffy" Benger, yet another of Galahad's old cronies
- Quincy Titterton, Groomsman, employed to mask the fact that he was a paid cricketer in Lord Emsworth's estate team
- Sue Brown, a chorus girl who falls for Ronnie Fish
- Edward Cootes, a card-sharp, in love with Aileen Peavey
- Alaric, Duke of Dunstable, an ill-mannered old man, an old friend of Connie
  - Horace Pendlebury-Davenport, Dunstable's wealthy nephew
  - Alaric "Ricky" Gilpin, Dunstable's impoverished nephew, a poet
  - Archibald "Archie" Gilpin, another nephew of Dunstable, also impoverished
  - Linda Gilpin, sister of Ricky and Dunstable's niece, a ward of court
- George Emerson, a Hong Kong policeman, in love with Aline Peters
- Lord Heacham, a rich landowner, once engaged to Angela
- Frederick Twistleton, Earl of Ickenham, a mischievous old Pelican
  - Pongo Twistleton, Fred's ever-embarrassed nephew
  - Valerie Twistleton, Fred's niece, who loves Horace Pendlebury-Davenport
- R. Jones, a fat bookmaker and conman
- Bill Lister, Galahad's godson, an artist who loves Prudence Garland
- Ashe Marson, a writer, the hero of Something Fresh
- Ralston McTodd, a Canadian poet
- Julia McTodd, Ralston's wife, friend of Eve Haliday and Phyllis Jackson
- Mrs (first name unclear) "Clarky" Clarkson, friend of Eve, Phyllis and Julia
- Aileen Peavey (a.k.a. Smooth Lizzie), an American poet and crook
- Aline Peters, Freddie's fiancée in Something Fresh
  - J. Preston Peters, Aline's father, a scarab collector
- Percy Frobisher Pilbeam, head of the Argus Private Inquiry Agency
- Tipton Plimsoll, a wealthy American friend of Freddie's, who falls for Veronica Wedge
- Claude "Mustard" Pott, another private detective, hired by Lord Bosham
  - Polly Pott, Mustard's pretty daughter, engaged to Ricky Gilpin
- Gloria Salt, an athletic girl, who is engaged to Sir Gregory Parsloe-Parsloe for a time
- George Alexander Pyke, Lord Tilbury, a publisher and pig owner
- Orlo Watkins, a tenor with whom Gertrude Alcester becomes infatuated
- Dame Daphne Winkworth, headmistress of a girls' school in Eastbourne; also a friend of Aunt Agatha
- Gerald Anstruther Vail, a thriller-writer who loves Penelope Donaldson
- Joan Valentine, the heroine of Something Fresh
- Orlo, Lord Vosper, a handsome nobleman who visits Blandings in Pigs Have Wings
- Augustus Whiffle (or Whipple), author of Lord Emsworth's favorite book, The Care of the Pig
- Jane Yorke, a friend of Freddie's wife Aggie

== Golf stories ==
- The Oldest Member
- Agnes Flack
- Sidney McMurdo
- The Wrecking Crew, a foursome:
  - The First Grave Digger
  - The Man with the Hoe
  - Old Father Time
  - Consul, the Almost-Human
- Felicia Blakeny
- Chester Meredith

== Jeeves and Wooster ==
- Reginald Jeeves
- Bertie Wooster (Bertram Wilberforce Wooster)

=== Jeeves's relations ===
- his niece Mabel, a model ("The Rummy Affair of Old Biffy" from Carry On, Jeeves)
- his cousin Egbert, constable of Beckley-in-the-Moor ("Without the Option" from Carry On, Jeeves)
- his uncle Charlie Silversmith, butler at Deverill Hall in Hampshire (The Mating Season)
  - Queenie, daughter of Charlie Silversmith, maid at Deverill Hall
- his aunt P.B. Pigott, in Maiden Eggesford (Aunts Aren't Gentlemen, also titled The Cat-nappers)

=== Bertie's relations ===
- his aunt Dahlia Travers, sister to his late father
  - her husband Tom Travers, his uncle
  - Angela Travers, Tom and Dahlia's daughter
  - Bonzo Travers, Tom and Dahlia's son
- his aunt Agatha Gregson, later Lady Worplesdon, sister to his late father
  - Spenser Gregson, her first husband
    - Thomas Gregson, (Thos.), their son
  - Percy Craye, Earl of Worplesdon, her second husband
    - Lady Florence Craye, Lord Worplesdon's daughter
    - Edwin Craye, his son, a Boy Scout
    - Zenobia "Nobby" Hopwood, his ward
- his uncle Willoughby Wooster, Bertie's initial trustee, resident of a country seat in Shropshire, notable for his scandalous Reminiscences
- his uncle Henry Wooster, a very personable 'looney' who kept pet rabbits in his bedroom
  - Emily Wooster, Henry's widow
  - Claude and Eustace Wooster, Henry and Emily's troublesome twin sons, Bertie's cousins
- his uncle George Wooster, Lord Yaxley, who has devoted his entire life to the pleasures of the table, and "discovered that alcohol was a food well in advance of modern medical thought"
  - Maud Wilberforce, a former barmaid and Lord Yaxley's former fiancée, whom he ends up marrying
- his sister Mrs. Scholfield, who lives in India with her three daughters
- Gussie Mannering-Phipps, Bertie's cousin in New York
  - Ray Denison, Gussie's fiancée and music hall performer

=== Bertie's friends ===
- Harold "Beefy" Anstruther, Bertie's friend from Oxford, engaged to Hilda, a friend of Madeline Bassett
- Cyril Bassington-Bassington
- Bill Belfry, 9th Earl of Rowcester, an impoverished friend of Bertie and a fellow member of the Drones Club
- Francis "Bicky" Bickersteth, a young Englishman sent to make his fortune in New York
  - The Duke of Chiswick, Bicky's wealthy and displeased uncle
- Charles Edward "Biffy" Biffen, a fellow member of the Drones Club, who is extremely absent-minded and in love with Jeeves's niece Mabel
- The Rev. Rupert "Beefy" Bingham, a school friend, also a friend of Freddie Threepwood
- Freddie Bullivant, another Drones Club member
  - Elizabeth Vickers, the girl whom Freddie loves
- Marmaduke, 5th Baron "Chuffy" Chuffnell, a school friend
  - Myrtle, the Dowager Lady Chuffnell, Chuffy's aunt
    - Seabury, Lady Chuffnell's son by her first marriage
- Bruce "Corky" Corcoran, a New York portrait painter turned cartoonist
  - Alexander Worple, Corky's wealthy uncle
  - Muriel Singer, first Corky's fiancée and later Mrs Alexander Worple
- Augustus "Gussie" Fink-Nottle, lover of newts
- George Webster "Boko" Fittleworth, author of plays and fiction
- Cyril "Barmy" Fotheringay-Phipps (pronounced "Funghy Fipps")
- Hildebrand "Tuppy" Glossop, Sir Roderick Glossop's nephew
  - Cora Bellinger, an opera singer whom Tuppy loves briefly
- Reginald "Kipper" Herring, former fellow inmate of Malvern House, their preparatory school.
- Richard P. "Bingo" Little, renowned in the early days for his ability to fall in love with every girl he meets, later marries Rosie M. Banks and becomes editor of Wee Tots magazine
  - Rosie Little, née Rosie M. Banks, Bingo's wife, a novelist whom Bertie impersonates once
  - Algernon Aubrey Little, Bingo's son
  - Mortimer Little, Lord Bittlesham, Bingo's uncle and provider of his allowance
- The Rev. Harold "Stinker" Pinker, curate of Totleigh-in-the-Wold.
  - Stephanie "Stiffy" Pinker, née Byng, his wife
  - Not to be confused with Lionel "Stinker" Green, a minor character in Money in the Bank.
- Claude Cattermole "Catsmeat" Potter-Pirbright, a school friend
  - Cora "Corky" Pirbright, his sister
    - Rev. Sidney Pirbright, Catsmeat's and Corky's uncle; vicar of King's Deverill
- Oliver Randolph "Sippy" Sipperley, an impecunious aspiring author
  - Vera Sipperley, his aunt and means of financial support
  - Professor Pringle, his daughter Heloise, and aunt Jane, friends of Aunt Vera
  - Gwendolen Moon, a poet with whom he is in love
- Rockmetteller "Rocky" Todd, a poet who lives on Long Island and hates New York City
  - Isabel Rockmetteller, Rocky's city-loving and culture-loving aunt

=== Bertie's antagonists ===
- Sir Watkyn Bassett, CBE, a magistrate in Bosher Street
  - Madeline Bassett, his daughter
  - Stephanie "Stiffy" Byng, his niece
  - Butterfield, his butler
- Major Plank, a retired explorer
- D'Arcy "Stilton" Cheesewright
- Sir Roderick Glossop, a 'nerve specialist' in Harley Street, became Bertie's good friend in Thank You, Jeeves
  - Lady Glossop, his wife
  - Hildebrand "Tuppy" Glossop, his nephew
  - Honoria Glossop, his daughter
  - Oswald Glossop, Honoria's younger brother
- Roderick Spode, 7th Earl of Sidcup, an amateur fascist dictator and designer of women's underclothing
  - Mrs. Wintergreen, his aunt
  - Col. H. H. Wintergreen, late husband of Mrs. Wintergreen
- Aubrey Upjohn, Bertie's former headmaster at Malvern House.

=== Romantic interests and fiancées ===
- Madeline Bassett, Sir Watkyn Bassett's daughter
- Daphne Braythwayt, Honoria Glossop's friend
- Stephanie "Stiffy" Byng, later Mrs. Harold Pinker, Watkyn Bassett's niece
- Lady Florence Craye, Lord Worplesdon's daughter
- Honoria Glossop, Sir Roderick Glossop's daughter
- Aline Hemmingway, Soapy Sid's partner in crime
- Gwladys Pendlebury, an artist who paints Bertie's portrait
- Pauline Stoker
  - J. Washburn Stoker, her father, an American millionaire
  - Dwight Stoker, Washburn's son and Pauline's younger brother
  - Emerald Stoker, Pauline's sister
  - Benstead, valet to George Stoker, Washburn's late cousin; a friend of Jeeves
- Lady Cynthia Wickhammersley, daughter of Lord Wickhammersley
- Roberta "Bobbie" Wickham, enamoured of practical jokes
  - Lady Wickham, Bobbie's mother; an old friend of Aunt Agatha
  - Clementina, Bobbie's cousin

=== Domestic staff ===
- Meadowes, Jeeves's predecessor as Bertie's valet
- Brinkley (renamed Rupert Bingley), Bertie's valet commissioned when Jeeves gives notice, soon sacked for his insane behavior
- Maple, Lord Worplesdon's butler
- Mulready, Sir Reginald Witherspoon's butler
- Oakshott, Uncle Willoughby's butler
- Purvis, Aunt Agatha's butler
- Seppings, the butler at Aunt Dahlia's home Brinkley Court
- Waterbury, the chauffeur at Brinkley Court
- Anatole, chef extraordinaire, employed by Tom and Dahlia Travers
- Butterfield, butler at Totleigh Towers

=== Other characters ===
- Mr Anstruther, an elderly man who holds a Good Conduct competition between Thomas Gregson and Bonzo Travers
- Mr Blumenfeld, theatrical producer
- Comrade Butt, a Marxist revolutionary
- Ernest Dobbs, constable of King's Deverill, and betrothed of Queenie Silversmith, Deverill Hall's beautiful parlourmaid
- The Rt. Hon. A. B. Filmer, a Cabinet Minister
- Esmond Haddock, a man dominated by his aunts
  - Charlotte, Emmeline, Harriet, and Myrtle Deverill, and Dame Daphne Winkworth, his aunts
- Sidney "Soapy Sid" Hemmingway, a con man
- Aline Hemmingway, Soapy Sid's partner in crime
- The Rev. Francis Heppenstall, a long-winded vicar
  - Mary Burgess, his niece
- Peggy Mainwaring, a student at Miss Tomlinson's school
- Miss Mapleton, headmistress of a girls' school in Bingley
- Sebastian Moon, a detestable young boy with golden curls
- Daphne Dolores Morehead, an attractive blonde bestselling novelist, prob. based on Daphne du Maurier
- Eustace Oates, constable at Totleigh-in-the-Wold
- Wilmot, Lord Pershore, a sheltered young man
  - Lady Malvern, his over-protective mother
- Rhoda Platt, a barmaid whom George Wooster, Lord Yaxley thinks he loves
- Lucius Pim, an artist who loves Gwladys Pendlebury
  - Beatrice Slingsby, his sister
  - Alexander Slingsby, Beatrice's husband
- Laura Pyke, a nutrition-obsessed schoolmate of Rosie M. Banks
- Charlotte Corday Rowbotham, a Marxist with whom Bingo Little falls in love
- Jane Snettisham, Aunt Dahlia's friend, who attempts to win Anatole from her in a bet
  - Jack, Lord Snettisham, Jane's husband
- Rupert Steggles, a crooked bookie
- Mrs Tinkler-Moulke, a patient of Sir Roderick Glossop
- Miss Tomlinson, the headmistress of a girls' school
- The Rev. Aubrey Upjohn, headmaster of Malvern House, where Bertie went to school
- Lord Wickhammersley, a friend of Bertie's late father
  - Lady Cynthia Wickhammersley, his daughter
- Dame Daphne Winkworth, Aunt Agatha's friend and Madeline Bassett's godmother; also an acquaintance of Lord Emsworth
  - Gertrude Winkworth, her daughter
- Jas. Waterbury, the "greasy bird": theatrical agent and blackmailer
- George Travers, Tom Travers's brother
- Sir Reginald Witherspoon, Bart., husband of Tom Travers's sister Katharine
- McIntosh, Aunt Agatha's terrier
- Augustus "Gus" the cat, lives at Brinkley Court, intensely dislikes being disturbed from his sleep and, unlike most cats, dislikes being scratched under the ears

== Mr. Mulliner ==
- Mr. Mulliner, pub raconteur with a large family, including several nephews.
  - Miss Postlethwaite, a waitress at the Angler's Rest.
  - his nephew Archibald Mulliner, sock collector who can mimic a hen laying an egg.
  - another nephew, Augustine, is a timid young curate who went on to marry his vicar's daughter. His rise through the ranks of the Church of England was partially due to his uncle Wilfred's tonic Buck-U-Uppo. According to N. T. P. Murphy, Augustine is similar to the "pale young curate" Gilbert and Sullivan's The Sorcerer.
  - Anselm, another nephew, also a pale young curate. Victoria McLure notes that both Augustine and Anselm endear themselves to the reader because they are "underdogs among the clerical caste", and they must "fight their prospective fathers-in-law in order to gain enough money and enough respect to marry".

== Mike and Psmith ==
- Psmith, an immaculately dressed, monocle-sporting young man. His name is Rupert Psmith in his early appearances, but is changed to Ronald Psmith in Leave it to Psmith (a Blandings story, characters from which are listed above), presumably to avoid confusion with Rupert Baxter
  - Mr Smith, Psmith's father, an eccentric man
- Mike Jackson, best friend of Psmith
- Burgess, captain of the Wrykyn cricket team
- "Gazeka" Firby-Smith, head of Mike's house at Wrykyn
- Bob Jackson, Mike's elder brother, also at Wrykyn
- Trevor and Clowes, friends of Bob and keen cricketers
- Wain, master of Mike's house at Wrykyn
  - Wyatt, Wain's step-stop, who shares a dorm with Mike at Wrykyn
- Neville-Smith, a day boy at Wrykyn, a good fast bowler
- Strachan, the boy who took Mike's place as IX Cricket Captain
- Mr Outwood, master of Mike and Psmith's house at Sedleigh
- Mr Downing, master of another house at Sedleigh
- Adair, very keen cricket captain at Sedleigh
- Tom Jellicoe, a boy in Outwood's house, who shares a dorm with Mike and Psmith
- Spiller, another boy in Outwood's, whose study Psmith steals
- Stone, another boy in Outwood's, a ragger
- Robinson, another boy in Outwood's, Stone's henchman
- Dunster, a Sedleigh old boy and famed ragger
- Sergeant Collard, portly school sergeant as Sedleigh
- John Bickersdyke, head of the New Asiatic Bank
- Mr Rossiter, Head Postage at the Bank, a football fan
  - Bannister, Mike's forerunner in Postage
  - Bristow, Mike's successor there
- Mr Robert Waller, Head of the Cash Department, an amiable sort, but a secret socialist
- Mr Prebble, an unintelligible socialist orator
- Joe Jackson, one of Mike's brothers, an M.C.C. player
- Reggie Jackson, another cricket playing brother
- Billy Windsor, a New York journalist befriended by Psmith
  - Pugsy Maloney, the office-boy at Windsor's paper
- Kid Brady, a boxer boosted by Psmith in New York
- Bat Jarvis, a New York gangster befriended by Psmith
  - Long Otto, one of Jarvis' henchmen, a stringy, silent young man
- Spider Reilly, another gang boss, head of the "Three Points" gang
  - Jack Repetto, a thug in Reilly's gang, who ruins Psmith's hat
- Dude Dawson, head of the "Table Hill" gang, Reilly's main rival
- Francis Parker, a sinister, well-dressed man

== Ukridge ==
- Stanley Featherstonehaugh Ukridge, entrepreneur
  - Julia Ukridge, his aunt
    - Oakshott, one of Julia Ukridge's many butlers
    - Dora Mason, Julia Ukridge's secretary for a time
  - Millie, Ukridge's wife
    - Lady Elizabeth Lakenheath, Millie's aunt and guardian before her marriage
  - Charles Percy Cuthbertson, who calls himself "Uncle Percy", a distant step-relation of Ukridge
- James "Corky" Corcoran, a writer friend of Ukridge, the narrator of all the Ukridge shorts.
  - Bowles, Corky's landlord
- George Tupper, a friend of Ukridge and Corky from Wrykyn days
- B. V. "Boko" Lawlor, an ex-Wrykynian who stands for Parliament
- J. G. "Looney" Coote, another ex-Wrykynian friend
- "Battling" Billson, a boxer managed by Ukridge
  - Flossie, Billson's girl
- Teddy Weeks, once a friend of Ukridge and Corky, who becomes a movie star
- Joe "the Lawyer", an unsavoury associate of Ukridge
- Izzy Previn, another untrustworthy type
- Beale, Ukridge's man in Love Among the Chickens
- Professor Derrick, Ukridge's Irish neighbour in Love Among the Chickens
  - Phyllis Derrick, the professor's daughter, admired by Jeremy Garnet
  - Tom Chase, a friend of the Derricks
- Jeremy Garnet, another writer friend of Ukridge, who narrates Love Among the Chickens
- Harry Hawk, a large local in Love Among the Chickens, who aids Garnet in a plot

== Uncle Fred ==
- Frederick Altamont Cornwallis Twistleton, 5th Earl of Ickenham, familiarly known as Uncle Fred
  - Jane, Lady Ickenham, Uncle Fred's wife, who went willingly to the Caribbean
  - Pongo Twistleton, nephew of Uncle Fred
  - Valerie Twistleton, Pongo's sister

== Other ==
Introduced in rough order of the book in which they first appear

- Clarence MacAndrew Chugwater, a Boy Scout, hero of The Swoop
- Roland Bleke, hero of the A Man of Means shorts, a young man who finds money brings trouble
- James Willoughby Pitt, the hero of A Gentleman of Leisure (U.S. title: The Intrusion of Jimmy)
  - Molly McEachern, for whom Jimmy Pitt falls
    - John McEachern, Molly's father, a policeman
  - Arthur Mifflin, an actor, an old friend of Pitt
- "Spennie", Earl of Dreever, who McEachern hopes Molly will marry
  - Lady Julia Blunt, Spennie's imperious aunt
  - Sir Thomas Blunt, her wealthy husband
- Spike Mullins, a New York thief who becomes Jimmy Pitt's valet for a time
- Charteris, a keen organiser of amateur theatre
- Hargate, a card-sharp who preys on Lord Dreever
- William Paradene West, known to all as Bill, of Bill the Conqueror fame
  - Cooley Paradene, Bill West's uncle, a wealthy businessman and collector of rare books
    - Otis Paradene, Cooley's sponging brother
    - Jasper Daly, Cooley's sponging brother-in-law
    - Evelyn Paradene-Kirby, Cooley's baby-talking, sponging niece
    - Horace French, an unpleasant youth adopted by Paradene
      - Sherman Bastable, Horace's tutor
      - Professor Appleby, Horace's white-bearded mentor
      - Joe the Dip, a member of Appleby's gang
    - Wilfred Slingsby, Paradene's man in London
- Judson Coker, Bill West's best friend, a devout drinker
  - Alice Coker, Judson's doting sister, adored by Bill
  - Prudence Stryker, a New York chorus girl, old friend of Judson Coker
- George Alexander Pyke, Lord Tilbury, media mogul, who first appears in Bill the Conqueror and later visits Blandings
  - Roderick Pyke, Pyke's droopy son
  - Frances Hammond, Pyke's doting sister
    - Sinclair Hammond, Frances' husband, an archaeologist
      - Felicia "Flick" Sheridan, Hammond's orphaned niece, who adores Bill but is engaged to Roderick
- Percy Frobisher Pilbeam, Roderick's deputy on Society Spice, later editor and detective
- Sam Shotter, a somewhat eccentric American, hero of Sam the Sudden (US title: Sam in the Suburbs)
  - Mr John B. Pynsent, American Export-Import millionaire, Sam's uncle
  - Clarence "Hash" Todhunter, an old seafaring pal of Sam's, who becomes his cook
- Kay Derrick, a pretty young woman, with whose photograph Sam falls in love
  - Mr Matthew Wrenn, Kay's uncle and guardian
    - Claire Lippett, their fiery maid
- Willoughby Braddock, a schoolfriend of Sam and an old neighbour of Kay
  - Mrs Martha Lippett, Claire's mother, housekeeper to Braddock
- Alexander "Chimp" Twist, a.k.a. J Sheringham Adair, a crook employed by Lord Tilbury
  - Thomas "Soapy" Molloy, an old comrade of Twist, a conman
    - Dora "Dolly" Gunn, Molloy's wife, a skilled pick-pocket
- The late Edward "Finky" Finglass, a bank robber, once a resident of Valley Fields
- Claude Winnington-Bates, an unpleasant Wrykyn old boy
  - Mrs Winnington-Bates, mother of Claude, Kay's demanding employer
- Mr Cornelius, a white-bearded estate agent and historian, a friend of Mr Wrenn
- Ogden Ford, an obnoxious child, a popular target of kidnappers and thus known as The Little Nugget
  - Elmer Ford, Ogden's wealthy and commanding father
  - Mrs Nesta Ford (later Mrs Ford Pett), his doting mother
- Peter Burns, a well-to-do young man, who tries to kidnap Ogden for Mrs Ford
  - Cynthia Drassilis, the ambitious fiancée of Peter Burns
    - Mrs Drassilis, Cynthia's even more ambitious mother
- Audrey Sheridan, Ogden's governess, once Peter Burns's first love
- Arnold Abney, the mild and pompous headmaster of Sanstead House
  - Mr Glossop, an irascible master at Sanstead
  - White, butler at Sanstead, soon found to be undercover
  - Mrs Attwell, matron as Santead
- "Smooth" Sam Fisher, an intellectual crook who kidnaps Ogden Ford
- Buck MacGinnis, a gang leader and archrival of Smooth Sam Fisher
- Lord Mountry, a nervous young noble
  - Augustus Beckford, a pupil at Sanstead, cousin of Lord Mountry
- Tankerville Gifford, an unpleasant socialite
- Miss Benjafield, barmaid at the Feathers an inn near the school
- Peter Pett, Millionaire and wife to Nesta Ford
- Anne Chester, Mr Pett's niece and beloved of Jimmy Crocker
- Jimmy Crocker, wild socialite on the mend
- Eugenia Crocker (Formerly van Brunt), disapproving stepmother of Jimmy and Nesta Ford's sister.
- Bingley Crocker, his father, enthusiastic baseball fan
- Skinner, Chicago Ed (Various Aliases of Bingley Crocker)
- Jerry Mitchell, Mr Pett's physical instructor
- Willie Partridge, Nesta Ford's nephew and inventor of the explosive Partidgite
- Lord Wisbeach (actually Jack the Gentleman), thief after the explosive
- Lord Wisbeach (The Real One), Piccadilly Jim's friend
- Mr Sturgis, head of a detective agency
- Miss Trimble, private detective and ardent socialist
- Bud Smithers, owner of a dogs' home thought appropriate for Ogden by several conspirators
- Lord Percy Whipple, who fights Piccadilly Jim in a club
- Monty Bodkin, a member of the Drones Club who appears in a number of novels and is one of Lord Emsworth's many secretaries
  - Gertrude Butterwick, to whom Monty was engaged.
  - John G. Butterwick (J. B. Butterwick in 'Pearls'), Gertrude's father, uncle to Ambrose and Reggie, demands that Monty hold a job for one year
    - Ambrose Tennyson, cousin of Gertrude Butterwick, elder brother of Reggie, novelist engaged to Lotus Blossom
  - Reggie Tennyson, cousin of Gertrude Butterwick, younger brother of Ambrose, Drones Club member and friend of Monty
  - Sandy Miller, Monty's secretary in California, whom he marries.
- Reggie Pepper, the hapless protagonist of several stories; Bertie Wooster's prototype
- Oofy Prosser, the richest member of Drones Club.
  - Myrtle Prosser, Oofy's wife.
- Pillingshot, schoolboy at St. Austin's, pose as a 'master detective'
- J G Miller, Jeff to his friends, is the protagonist in Money in the Bank
  - Myrtle Shoesmith is Jeff's fiancé
  - Clarissa Cork rents the Hall in Money in the Bank
