= Service with a Smile =

1961 novel by P. G. Wodehouse

- First edition (US)
- Author: P. G. Wodehouse
- Cover artist: Paul Bacon
- Language: English
- Genre: Comic novel
- Publisher: Simon & Schuster (US); Herbert Jenkins (UK)
- Publication date: 15 October 1961 (US); 17 August 1962 (UK)
- Publication place: United States
- Media type: Print (hardback & paperback)
- Preceded by: Pigs Have Wings (Blandings), Cocktail Time (Uncle Fred)
- Followed by: Galahad at Blandings

Service with a Smile is a novel by P. G. Wodehouse, first published in the United States on 15 October 1961 by Simon & Schuster, Inc., New York, and in the United Kingdom on 17 August 1962 by Herbert Jenkins, London. A condensed version of the story had previously been published in two parts in the Toronto Star Weekly, on 26 August and 2 September 1961.

It is the eighth full-length novel set at Blandings Castle, and features the unstoppable Uncle Fred in his fourth and final novel appearance.

== Plot summary ==
Myra Schoonmaker is staying at Blandings Castle, her London season having been cut short by Connie. Connie is not happy that Myra wants to marry the impoverished East End curate Bill Bailey. Lord Emsworth is not happy with his sister, with his latest secretary Lavender Briggs and with the houseguest Duke of Dunstable. Adding to the unpleasantness, Lady Constance invites a party of Church Lads to camp out at the lake, young boys who enjoy taunting Emsworth.

When Connie says she will be away for a day having her hair done in Shrewsbury, Myra contacts Bailey, arranging to meet in a registry office and get married. Bailey, with his friend Pongo Twistleton and Pongo's Uncle Fred, waits at the selected spot, but Myra does not appear. Uncle Fred is an old friend of Myra and her father, and he likes Bailey. Fred then meets Emsworth, who is in London to attend the Opening of Parliament, and invites himself to Blandings to help Emsworth, the unhappy earl. He brings Bailey under the name of "Cuthbert Meriweather", an old friend returned from Brazil.

At the castle, Bailey and Myra are reunited, after learning each was waiting at a different registry office. The Church Lads trick Emsworth into diving into the lake to rescue one of their number, which turns out to be a log. This leads the Duke of Dunstable to again question Emsworth's sanity, always manifest in Emsworth’s affection for his pig, Empress of Blandings. Emsworth, at Fred's suggestion, takes his revenge on the Church Lads by cutting the ropes of their tent in the small hours.

Dunstable plans to steal the pig and sell it to Lord Tilbury for £2000. Lavender Briggs proposes to do the work of stealing the pig for £500; Dunstable will not sign a contract, so she insists he make a clear verbal agreement. Briggs enlists the pig man Wellbeloved to help and she has a second assistant available. She goes to London to deposit the cheque.

Myra tells Uncle Fred that Briggs is blackmailing her beloved Bailey, as she has recognised him, into helping with the pig scheme. Before Fred can come up with a plan, Bailey confesses all to Lord Emsworth, who in his wrath fires both Briggs and Wellbeloved. Emsworth then relates all of this to his sister, including Meriweather’s true identity. Connie orders Fred and Bailey out of the castle; they stay, as Fred threatens to reveal to the county that Beach cut the tent ropes, which would lead to embarrassment and the loss of a superlative butler. Upset at her failure in finding a good match for Myra, Connie cables James Schoonmaker to come to her aid from his home in New York.

When George Threepwood tells Dunstable that he has photographed his grandfather in the act of cutting the tent ropes, Dunstable realises that Briggs is no longer needed, as he can use the photos to blackmail Emsworth into parting with the pig. He meets up with Tilbury at The Emsworth Arms, where Lavender Briggs, returned from her day in London and unaware she has been fired, overhears him telling Tilbury he has cancelled her cheque; Dunstable raises the price for Tilbury to £3000 for the pig, which Tilbury will consider. After Dunstable leaves, Briggs approaches Tilbury, her former employer, with her offer to steal the pig for Tilbury at a lower price; he accepts and pays her. On leaving the inn, Briggs meets Uncle Fred, who tells her that Emsworth has fired her; he advises her to head back to London to deposit Tilbury's cheque. She wants this money to open her own secretarial service.

Schoonmaker arrives, answering Connie's request. Fred intercepts him at the railway station and takes him to the Emsworth Arms, where they catch up on old times. Fred informs his old friend of Myra's engagement to Archie Gilpin, which she did after breaking off with Bailey for his rash confession. Schoonmaker reveals he loves Connie, but lacks the courage to propose. Fred tells him that she has feelings for him and encourages Schoonmaker to propose to her. Later Gilpin tells Fred he has once again become engaged to Millicent Rigby, with whom he had had a minor falling out, and now finds himself engaged to two girls at once; he needs £1000, to buy into his cousin Ricky's onion-soup business and support his future wife. Fred encourages Archie to break it off with Myra.

Uncle Fred tricks Dunstable into thinking Schoonmaker is broke, and persuades him to pay out £1000 to get his nephew Archie out of his engagement to Myra, arguing that it is less than what Dunstable would have to pay to support the destitute Schoomaker family. Fred persuades him that Bill Bailey is a more suitable match for Myra. Connie is in tears on hearing Myra is engaged to Bailey, which gives Schoonmaker the nerve to propose to Connie. With help from Lavender Briggs, Fred plays for Dunstable the tape-recording of him scheming to steal the pig. In return for Fred keeping that quiet, Dunstable turns over the photos of Lord Emsworth to Fred. Fred keeps the tape so Dunstable will not stop the cheque to his nephew Archie.

With Bill and Myra headed to a registry office, archie reunites with Millicent to establish a business. Connie and Schoonmaker become engaged, and Dunstable is defeated.

== Characters ==
- Lord Emsworth, absent-minded master of Blandings Castle
  - Lady Constance Keeble, Emsworth's domineering sister
  - George Threepwood, Emsworth's grandson
  - Lavender Briggs, Emsworth's latest efficient secretary
  - Empress of Blandings, Emsworth's cherished prize pig
    - George Cyril Wellbeloved, the Empress' keeper
- Frederick Twistleton, 5th Earl of Ickenham, Uncle Fred, Emsworth's friend and protector
  - Pongo Twistleton, Fred's put-upon nephew
- James Schoonmaker, an American millionaire, friends with both Fred and Connie
  - Myra Schoonmaker, James' pretty daughter
    - The Reverend Cuthbert "Bill" Bailey, a curate friend of Pongo's, engaged to Myra
- Alaric, Duke of Dunstable, a cantankerous peer
  - Archie Gilpin, Dunstable's handsome artist nephew
- George Alexander Pyke, Lord Tilbury, publishing magnate and pig lover
  - Millicent Rigby, Tilbury's secretary, romantically entwined with Archie
- Beach, butler at the castle

== Publication history ==
The first US edition dust jacket illustration was drawn by Paul Bacon.

An excerpt from the book was included in the 1984 collection The World of Wodehouse Clergy, published by Hutchinson, London.

== See also ==
Dunstable and Uncle Fred had both previously visited the Castle in Uncle Fred in the Springtime (1939), while Tilbury showed up there in Heavy Weather (1933), as well as appearing, like Uncle Fred, in several non-Blandings stories.
