= Rupert Baxter =

Fictional character in P. G. Wodehouse stories

Rupert J. Baxter is a fictional character in the Blandings stories by P. G. Wodehouse. Often called the Efficient Baxter, he is Lord Emsworth's secretary (although he routinely loses and regains this job), and an expert on many things, including Egyptian scarabs. He invariably wears his rimless spectacles, suspects many castle guests of being impostors (very often accurately and with good reason), and is, as his epithet suggests, extremely efficient.

== Character ==
Baxter is an efficient and practical individual. He likes order, and despises Lord Emsworth's fuzzy mind and lifestyle. He sees himself as a man destined to bring order to Blandings, and is proud of his position as de facto ruler of one of England's largest houses. It is this pride which brings him back time and again to Blandings, despite the better pay and working conditions available to him in the household of Mr J. Horace Jevons, his employer before and after his reigns at Blandings, a man who treats him with the respect, and even obsequiousness, he demands; Mr Jevons' financial advice also allows Baxter to treble his savings.

Not the most emotional of men, his head is rarely turned by women, although on one occasion, meeting Sue Brown but believing her to be Myra Schoonmaker, he finds himself approving very much of the idea of an heiress to sixty million dollars. He is a good chess player, and also enjoys bezique. His weak stomach is his achilles heel.

== Appearances ==
Baxter appears in four novels and a single short story:

- Something Fresh (1915)
- Leave it to Psmith (1923)
- Summer Lightning (1929)
- "The Crime Wave at Blandings", featured in the collection Lord Emsworth and Others (1937)
- Uncle Fred in the Springtime (1939)

He also receives mentions in Heavy Weather (1933), Service with a Smile (1962) and Galahad at Blandings (1965).

== Career ==
At some point prior to working at Blandings, Baxter worked for Sir Ralph Dillingworth, the Yorkshire baronet, who shot mice in the drawing room with an elephant gun; Baxter had to call in, and thus met, Sir Roderick Glossop, a fact which came in useful when Uncle Fred visited the castle impersonating Glossop. He also at one point worked for J. Horace Jevons, a Chicago millionaire.

Baxter first appears in Something Fresh; a man perfectly suited to his job, he "had no vices, but he sometimes relaxed his busy brain with a game of solitaire." Lord Emsworth finds him invaluable, but begins to question his trust when Baxter is discovered in the middle of the night, in the midst of a sea of upset tables, broken china, and food.

By the time of Leave it to Psmith, Baxter's efficiency has become a bane to the sunshine-loving Lord, and when he finds himself locked out of the castle wearing lemon-coloured pyjamas in the early morning, and throws flowerpots at Emsworth's bedroom window in an attempt to wake him, Emsworth decides he is insane and sacks him, replacing him with Rupert Psmith. He returns to the employ of J. Horace Jevons, a Chicago millionaire for whom he had worked prior to coming to the castle.

Despite his being sacked, Baxter longs to organize the affairs of the absent-minded Emsworth, and remains a faithful friend and ally of Lady Constance. He returns for a time in Summer Lightning, while Hugo Carmody occupies his former position. He is called back by Lady Constance to steal Galahad's scandalous memoirs, and arrives at the castle in a caravan, pretending to be passing by on a caravaning tour. Not long after he arrives, he is disturbed while searching for the manuscript, and leaps from the library window to land in a flowerbed at Lord Emsworth's feet, adding to the Earl's poor opinion of Baxter's sanity, an opinion worsened further when, at the climax of proceedings, he is found hiding under Sue Brown's bed (a young girl for whom he had developed some affection, on the basis that she was a wealthy heiress, and was disgusted to find was an impostor).

In Heavy Weather, days after Baxter has left, Galahad and Lord Emsworth are led to believe that he had been employed by Sir Gregory Parsloe-Parsloe to steal Emsworth's prize pig, Empress of Blandings.

Baxter returns briefly to Blandings in "The Crime Wave at Blandings", at first as a stop on motorcycle tour of England, but he soon becomes a prospective tutor for George, Lord Bosham's second son and Lord Emsworth's grandson. However, when several members of the Blandings household shoot him in the hind parts with young George's air gun, he is cured of his longing, despite Emsworth's offer of a return to his old post, and decides to leave Blandings permanently to work for Mr. Jevons.

Unable to stay away, Baxter returns again in Uncle Fred in the Springtime, where he is employed by the grouchy Duke of Dunstable, who visits the castle as a friend of Lady Constance. He works for Dunstable helping to compile the Dunstable family history, but is poorly treated by the Duke, who suspects him of going on "toots", and hits him in the face with a well-thrown egg when he hears him singing on the lawn outside his rooms, and also has him help steal Empress of Blandings, a task which sorely tries Baxter's nerve; he is later slipped a Mickey Finn by Uncle Fred. He is last mentioned in Galahad at Blandings as being in the employ of an American millionaire in Pittsburgh, Pennsylvania.

== Adaptations ==
Television

- Anton Rodgers portrayed Baxter in an episode of The World of Wodehouse in 1967.
- Baxter was portrayed by David Walliams in the 2013–14 Blandings television series.

Film

- In the 1933 film Leave It to Me, Baxter was played by Gus McNaughton.
- Esme Percy portrayed Baxter in the 1933 film Summer Lightning.

Stage

- Edward Chapman portrayed Baxter in the 1930 premiere of Wodehouse and Ian Hay's play Leave It to Psmith in London.

Radio

- In a 1939 radio dramatisation of "The Crime Wave at Blandings", Baxter was voiced by Carleton Hobbs.
- Baxter was voiced by Christopher Godwin in the 1981 radio adaptation of Leave It to Psmith.
- Michael McClain voiced Baxter in "The Crime Wave at Blandings", adapted as part of the Blandings radio series, in 1985. Christopher Godwin again portrayed Baxter in the 1987 radio adaptation of Summer Lightning.
- In 2009, Rupert Baxter was voiced by Jared Harris in a radio adaptation of Something Fresh. Harris reprised his role as Baxter in the 2010 radio adaptation of Summer Lightning, and in the 2012 radio adaptation of Uncle Fred in the Springtime.
- Joe Bannister played Baxter in the 2020 radio adaptation of Leave it to Psmith.
