= Full Moon (novel) =

1947 novel by P. G. Wodehouse

- First edition (US)
- Author: P. G. Wodehouse
- Language: English
- Genre: Comedy novel
- Publisher: Doubleday (US); Herbert Jenkins (UK)
- Publication date: 22 May 1947 (US); 17 Oct 1947 (UK)
- Publication place: United States
- Media type: Print (hardcover)
- Preceded by: Uncle Fred in the Springtime
- Followed by: "Birth of a Salesman" (short), Pigs Have Wings (novel)

Full Moon is a novel by P. G. Wodehouse, first published in the United States by Doubleday & Company on 22 May 1947, and in the United Kingdom by Herbert Jenkins on 17 October 1947. It is the sixth full-length novel to be set at the beautiful but trouble-ridden Blandings Castle, home of Lord Emsworth.

== Plot introduction ==
Clarence, 9th Earl of Emsworth, is forced to play host to his younger son Freddie, while two of his nieces, Prudence Garland and Veronica Wedge are romantically entangled with, respectively, Gally's godson Bill Lister and American millionaire Tipton Plimsoll. Complications ensue when the near-alcoholic Tipton thinks that Bill's gorilla-like face is an apparition brought about by too much drink; Lister, purporting to be a notable artist named Landseer, is commissioned to paint the portrait of Emsworth's prize pig, the Empress of Blandings; and the valuable necklace of Freddie's wife, Aggie, goes missing.

== Plot summary ==
Lord Emsworth is aghast to learn that his younger son Freddie is back in England from America, sent over to push "Donaldson's Dog-Joy" to the English dog-owning public. He is less worried to hear that his niece Prudence Garland is being called a "dream rabbit" by unknown men over the telephone. Freddie meets Prudence, and learns her caller was none other than Bill Lister, an old pal of Freddie's and godson of his uncle Galahad, with whom Prudence plans to elope.

The elopement is scuppered, however, when Prudence's mother Lady Dora has her sent to Blandings to cool off. Freddie and Galahad arrange for Lister to be near her, getting him a job painting Lord Emsworth's pig, Empress of Blandings. Freddie's wealthy American friend Tipton Plimsoll, after a lengthy binge celebrating his new-found wealth, decides to lay off the booze after mistaking Lister's gorilla-like face for an apparition, and heads down to Blandings with Freddie, who hopes to sell dog-biscuits to Tipton's stores.

At Blandings, Colonel and Lady Hermione Wedge are excited by the prospect of their beautiful daughter Veronica meeting such a wealthy man, even more so when the two hit it off immediately. Plimsoll, however, is thrown off by the reappearance of the face (Lister having come to gaze up at his beloved's window), and by Veronica's intimacy with Freddie, to whom, he learns, she was once engaged.

Lister's style fails to please Lord Emsworth, and the two fall out, but Freddie, at Gally's suggestion, smuggles him back into the castle disguised as a false-bearded gardener, having paid off Angus McAllister. Lister soon ruins things, however, when after scaring Plimsoll once more and terrifying Veronica, he mistakes her mother for the cook and tries to bribe her to pass a note to Prudence.

Gally heads to Blandings himself, for Veronica's birthday, and soon brings her and Plimsoll together by the simple expedient of putting the Empress in her bedroom. He also brings Lister with him, introducing him as another artist by the name of Landseer, counting on Emsworth's poor memory and the thick false beard to keep him from being recognised, but Freddie blows the gaff to Lady Hermione, while Gally is off bribing Pott the pig man to keep quiet, and Lister is asked to leave.

Also thanks to Emsworth's distracted nature, Freddie accidentally gives Veronica his wife's expensive diamond necklace (while the pendant he had bought for her was sent to Aggie in Paris). Gally smooths over a resurgence of jealousy in Plimsoll on seeing Vee in the necklace, by claiming it is false, and Plimsoll gives it to Prudence for the church jumble sale.

With Freddie desperate to get the necklace shipped over to his increasingly irate wife, and threatening to disrupt Plimsoll and Vee's happiness, Gally proposes to hold the family to ransom, getting the family's blessing for Prudence and Lister's marriage in return for the jewels. Lister, lurking in the gardens, glimpses an overjoyed Prudence on a balcony, but cannot catch her attention, so he fetches a ladder and climbs to the balcony. He is spotted by Colonel Wedge, who mistakes him for a burglar and fetches footmen and his revolver.

Lister, hearing the Colonel, tries to flee along a ledge to a drainpipe. He climbs down the drainpipe safely, but lands on Pott the pig man, who keeps him there until Wedge arrives. When Wedge hears Lister's story from Gally, he is impressed with the man's spirit and leaves him. Gally reveals he has lost the necklace, but hopes to bluff his sister.

Plimsoll arrives to confront his nemesis, and is delighted to learn Lister is real. Hermione approaches, and Gally successfully fools her into thinking he still holds the necklace; Emsworth, hearing his son is in danger of getting divorced and returning home for good, hurriedly pays for Lister's business. When Gally tells Hermione where the necklace is (in the flask taken from his room by Plimsoll), she is annoyed to realise she had it all along, Plimsoll having handed it to her when he still thought Lister was an hallucination.

== Characters ==
- The Earl of Emsworth, the absent-minded master of Blandings
  - Freddie Threepwood, his younger son, back from America
    - Tipton Plimsoll, a wealthy American friend of Freddie's
  - Lady Dora Garland, Emsworth's tall and stately sister
    - Prudence Garland, her pretty daughter
  - Lady Hermione Wedge, Emsworth's short and dumpy sister
    - Colonel Egbert Wedge, Hermione's doting husband
    - Veronica Wedge, their beautiful but simple daughter
  - The Hon. Galahad Threepwood, Emsworth's dashing brother
    - Bill Lister, Galahad's godson, an artist, in love with Prudence
  - Empress of Blandings, Emsworth's prize pig, painted by Lister
- Sebastian Beach, dignified head butler at the Castle

== Publication history ==
The first US edition dust jacket was illustrated by Paul Galdone. Illustrations by Galdone were included throughout the novel. The first UK edition dust jacket was illustrated by Frank Ford.

A condensed version of the story was published in Liberty (US) in November 1947, illustrated by Wallace Morgan.

== Reception ==
Wodehouse biographer Richard Usborne wrote, "This novel is too episodic for comfort, and unevenly paced. In patches Gally, its real hero, acts and talks more like Lord Ickenham than himself. 'Spreading sweetness and light' is Lord Ickenham's specific role, but here, Wodehouse, seeming to forget, applies these words to Gally. It strikes an odd note."

== Adaptations ==
The book was adapted as a radio drama by Douglas Young for BBC Radio 4. The radio drama first aired in four parts in April 1999, featuring Giles Havergal as both Lord Emsworth and Lady Hermione Wedge, Paul Birchard as Tipton Plimsoll, Alexander Morton as Colonel Wedge, Lucy Paterson as Veronica Wedge, Matthew Whittle as both Freddie Threepwood and Pott the pig man, Gerda Stevenson as Prudence Garland, Simon Tait as both Bill Lister and the Empress of Blandings, and Derwent Watson as both Galahad Threepwood and Beach.

== See also ==
The affairs of Tipton Plimsoll and the Wedge family are continued in Galahad at Blandings (1965).
