= Lady Constance Keeble =

Fictional character in P. G. Wodehouse stories

Lady Constance Keeble (née Threepwood, later Schoonmaker) is a recurring fictional character in the Blandings Castle stories by British comic writer P. G. Wodehouse, being Lord Emsworth's most formidable sister, a strikingly handsome woman, with a fair, broad brow, and perfectly even white teeth. She has the carriage of an empress, and her large grey eyes are misleadingly genial.

== Life and character ==
When we first meet her in Leave it to Psmith, she is recently married to wealthy Joe Keeble, and acting as châtelaine at Blandings. She has an interest in the Arts, and frequently invites writers and such to the castle; poets Aileen Peavey (who turns out to be a thief known as 'Smooth Lizzy'), Ralston McTodd and tenor Orlo Watkins are prime examples of this trait. She is described as attractive and mainly sweet in personality unless she is defied. The 'attractive and sweet' persona is evidently gone from her by Summer Lightning, however, which is perhaps because her husband, Joe Keeble has died.

She endeavours in vain to persuade her brother Lord Emsworth to dress more suitably, and to pay attention to important matters such as the family, rather than his garden and his beloved pig, Empress of Blandings. She bullies him mercilessly, forcing him to dress up in a tight collar and top hat for the Blandings Parva Annual School Treat, and making him act as a Justice of the Peace and make speeches at important local events. She also has a horror of anyone in her distinguished family marrying inappropriately, and spends much of her time trying to keep nieces and nephews away from unsavoury types. However, such matters pale in comparison to the embarrassment that could be caused by her brother Galahad Threepwood publishing his scandalous reminiscences; to prevent this, she is willing to allow the marriage of her nephew Ronnie to a chorus-girl, in Summer Lightning.

She is good friends with Sir Gregory Parsloe-Parsloe, with whom she conspires to prevent the publication of Galahad's memoirs. She approves of Rupert Baxter, Lord Emsworth's overbearing secretary, a man she considers most capable and on whom she calls whenever she is in dire need of practical assistance. In her youth, she had a bit of a thing with Alaric, the Duke of Dunstable, with whom she was often found whispering in conservatories or being the last back from picnics, but she later questions his sanity, even calling in Sir Roderick Glossop on one occasion to have him analysed.

Having been repeatedly defeated in her efforts to keep her family from marrying inappropriately, she finds herself once more in difficulty in Service with a Smile when she becomes chaperone to Myra Schoonmaker. Finding her attempts to keep the girl away from her impoverished lover scuppered by Uncle Fred, and with the redoubtable Baxter no longer available, she calls in the help of the girl's father, James Schoonmaker, an American millionaire. With the assistance of his old friend Uncle Fred, Schoonmaker gets up the courage to propose to the intimidating Connie, and the two are married in New York at the start of Galahad at Blandings.

== Stories ==
Lady Constance is featured in:

- Leave it to Psmith (1923), in which Joe Keeble features
- "Pig-hoo-o-o-o-ey" (1927)
- "Lord Emsworth and the Girl Friend" (1928)
- Summer Lightning (1929), in which she calls on Baxter's aid
- Heavy Weather (1933), in which she conspires with Parsloe-Parsloe
- "The Crime Wave at Blandings" (1936)
- Uncle Fred in the Springtime (1939), in which her past with Dunstable is revealed
- Pigs Have Wings (1952), in which she is a widow
- Service With a Smile (1961), in which James Schoonmaker first appears
- "Sticky Wicket at Blandings" (1966)
- A Pelican at Blandings (1969)

Lady Constance is mentioned in:

- Galahad at Blandings (1963) in which she marries James Schoonmaker

== Adaptations ==
Television

- Joan Sanderson played Lady Constance in a televised play adapted from "Pig-hoo-o-o-o-ey" in 1954, and a televised play titled "Lord Emsworth and the Little Friend" in 1956.
- In the 1967 television series Blandings Castle, the first series of The World of Wodehouse, Lady Constance was played by Meriel Forbes.
- Judy Parfitt played Lady Constance in the 1995 television film Heavy Weather, made by the BBC and partners and broadcast in the United States by PBS.
- Jennifer Saunders played Lady Constance in the 2013–2014 series Blandings, made by the BBC.

Film

- In the 1933 film Leave It to Me, Lady Constance was played by Toni Edgar-Bruce.

Radio

- She was portrayed by Gladys Young in the 1939 BBC Home Service radio adaptation of "The Crime Wave at Blandings", and in the 1940 radio adaptation of "Pig-hoo-o-o-o-ey".
- In the 1981 dramatisation of Leave It to Psmith broadcast on BBC Radio 4, she was voiced by Joan Greenwood.
- In the 1985–1992 Blandings radio series, she was voiced in different episodes by Margot Boyd, Elizabeth Spriggs, and Joan Sanderson.
- Lady Constance was portrayed by Patricia Hodge in radio adaptations of Summer Lightning (2010), Uncle Fred in the Springtime (2012), and Leave it to Psmith (2020).
