= Guy Andrews =

English TV/writer

Guy Andrews, educated at Cranleigh School (1974–79) and St. Peter's College, Oxford University, is an English television writer who has written for television programmes including "Lost in Austen", "Absolute Power", "Agatha Christie's Poirot", "Chancer" and "Blandings" (the latter adapting the works of P. G. Wodehouse).

== Writing credits ==
Production	Notes	Broadcaster
Les Girls	"Prints" (1988)	ITV
Tales of Sherwood Forest	"Gene Vincent and the Memory Man" (1989); "I Came to Casablanca for the Waters" (1989)	ITV
Chancer	6 episodes (1990–1991)	ITV
All or Nothing at All	Television miniseries (1993)	ITV
Lie Down with Lions	Television film (1994)	Lifetime
The Infiltrator	Television film (1995)	HBO
Paparazzo	Feature film (1995)	N/A
Prime Suspect 5: Errors of Judgement	Television miniseries (1996)	ITV
When the Sky Falls	Feature film (co-written with Ronan Gallagher, Colum McCann and Michael Sheridan, 2000)	N/A
Absolute Power	12 episodes (co-written with Mark Lawson and Andrew Rattenbury, 2003–2004)	BBC Two
Rosemary & Thyme	"The Invisible Worm" (2004)	ITV
Agatha Christie's Poirot	"The Mystery of the Blue Train" (2005); "Taken at the Flood" (2006); "Appointment with Death" (2008); "The Labours of Hercules" (2013)	ITV
Lost in Austen	Television miniseries (2008)	ITV
Inspector Lewis	"Expiation" (2007); "Counter Culture Blues" (2009)	ITV
Bouquet of Barbed Wire	Television miniseries (2010)	ITV
Blandings	13 episodes (2013–2014)	BBC One
Fungus the Bogeyman	2 episodes (2015)	Sky
Maigret in Montmartre	TV Movie (2017)	ITV
Victoria	3 episodes (2016-2019)	ITV
