= Uncle Fred Flits By =

- Short story by P. G. Wodehouse
- Country: United Kingdom
- Language: English
- Genre: Comedy

Publication
- Publisher: Redbook (US); Strand (UK)
- Media type: Print (Magazine)
- Publication date: July 1935 (US); December 1935 (UK)
- Series: Drones Club

"Uncle Fred Flits By" is a short story by British comic writer P. G. Wodehouse, which was published in the United States in the July 1935 edition of Redbook, and in the United Kingdom in the December 1935 issue of the Strand. It was included in the collection Young Men in Spats (1936).

The story is part of the main Drones Club canon. It features club member Pongo Twistleton and his mischievous Uncle Fred. This is Uncle Fred's debut -- and only short story -- in the Wodehouse canon; Pongo had appeared in a couple of previous Drones Club stories. Pongo and Uncle Fred would go on to appear in four novels, including making two visits to Blandings Castle.

In the story, Uncle Fred manages to gain access to a house to use as shelter after he and Pongo get caught in the rain. When relatives of the house's owner come to speak with him about a family drama concerning a young couple, Uncle Fred naturally involves himself in their affairs, leaving Pongo no choice but to play along.

== Plot ==
The aspect of this young man was haggard. His eyes glared wildly and he sucked at an empty cigarette-holder. If he had a mind, there was something on it.

— Pongo is nervous about his Uncle Fred coming

At the Drones Club, a Crumpet and his guest see Pongo Twistleton looking distraught. The Crumpet explains that Pongo has learned his mischievous Uncle Fred, Lord Ickenham, is coming to London, and tells the following story about what happened the last time Uncle Fred came.

Uncle Fred suggests to his nephew that they visit a suburb, Mitching Hill, formerly an estate owned by an uncle when he was younger. They go there, but get caught in a shower of rain and take shelter in a doorway.

The door is opened by a maid, and Uncle Fred, finding the owners are away, gains access to the house by posing as someone come to clip the parrot's claws, with Pongo introduced as his assistant Mr Walkinshaw. The maid leaves on an errand, and Uncle Fred makes himself comfortable. A pink-faced man visits the house looking for Mr Roddis. Uncle Fred claims to be Mr Roddis and introduces Pongo as his son Douglas. The visitor is Wilberforce Robinson, an eel-jellier, who is in love with Roddis's wife's estranged sister Connie Parker's daughter Julia, but is disapproved of by the family as being beneath them socially. He has come to Mr Roddis for help. When Julia arrives with her parents, Uncle Fred suggests Robinson hide behind the sofa to avoid trouble.

The Parkers enter, and Uncle Fred introduces Pongo as a deaf veterinarian attending to the parrot. Julia's parents tell the story of the eel-jellier wooing their daughter, and Julia insists she loves him, on which the man leaps from behind the couch and kisses her. Uncle Fred criticizes the Parkers' insistence that their family is superior to Robinson's by claiming that various cousins and uncles made their money in immoral and even criminal ways. Though Mrs Parker denies all, Robinson sees it as vindication of his own family background, and claims all he needs is a hundred pounds to buy a share in a business. Uncle Fred provides the money at once, and Robinson and Julia leave delighted.

Uncle Fred and Pongo leave the Parkers drinking a reviving cup of tea after their bizarre ordeal, and in the street meet Mr Roddis, the owner of the house. Uncle Fred introduces himself as a neighbour Mr J. G. Bulstrode, and Pongo as his brother-in-law, Percy Frensham. He tells Roddis two people broke into his house, pointing through the window to the tea-drinking couple, and advises Roddis to call the police. Though Uncle Fred is pleased with his actions, Pongo is shaken by his uncle's mischief. Thus, concludes the Crumpet, is Pongo's demeanour - on hearing he has to face another visit from his uncle - explained.

== Style ==
Wodehouse makes use of various stylistic devices in his stories to create humour. One of the devices Wodehouse employs is the pun, as in the following quote from "Uncle Fred Flits By":

"It won't be long," said the girl, "before Wilberforce suddenly rises in the world."
She never spoke a truer word. At this very moment, up he came from behind the settee like a leaping salmon.

== Background ==
Wodehouse's childhood experiences in Victorian Croydon inspired Uncle Fred's memories from childhood of the fictional Mitching Hill, which Uncle Fred recalls was once open country before becoming a suburb.

Wodehouse was fond of parrots, and throughout the 1920s and 1930s, he kept pet parrots on and off. In addition to "Uncle Fred Flits By", he included a parrot in the short story "Ukridge Rounds a Nasty Corner".

== Publication history ==
In the American women's magazine Red Book (which became Redbook in May 1943), the story was illustrated by James Montgomery Flagg. The story was illustrated by Gilbert Wilkinson in the Strand. In April 1948, the story appeared in a Swedish literary magazine, translated by Birgitta Hammer and illustrated by Kjell Wiborgh. In August 1955, the story appeared in Playboy with illustrations by Jerry Warshaw.

"Uncle Fred Flits By" was collected in the 1939 English edition of Week-End Wodehouse published by Herbert Jenkins Limited, in the 1960 collection The Most of P. G. Wodehouse published by Simon and Schuster, and in the 1978 collection Vintage Wodehouse, edited by Richard Usborne and published by Barrie & Jenkins. The story appeared in the 1982 collection Tales from the Drones Club, and in the 1983 collection The World of Uncle Fred. It was collected in A Wodehouse Bestiary, a 1985 collection of animal-related Wodehouse stories.

The story was included in the 1937 anthology Modern Short Stories, published by Harcourt, Brace & Co. It was featured in the 1939 anthology Tellers of Tales: 100 Short Stories from the United States, England, France, Russia and Germany, edited by William Somerset Maugham. The story was included in the 1945 anthology Adventures in English Literature, published by Harcourt. The 1952 anthology The Hilton Bedside Book: A Treasury of Entertaining Reading Selected Exclusively for the Guests of the Hilton Hotels featured the story. It was included in the 1957 anthology I Couldn't Help Laughing, with stories selected and introduced by Ogden Nash. The story also appeared in the 1979 anthology Rogues: Stories of Swindlers, Thieves, and Confidence Men, published by Crowell.

== Adaptations ==
A radio drama based on the story was broadcast on the BBC Home Service on 14 October 1939. The radio drama starred Cecil Trouncer as Uncle Fred and Philip Cunningham as Pongo. Other cast members included Ewart Scott as Wilberforce Robinson, Ralph Truman as Claude Parker, Angela Kirk as Julia Parker, Gladys Young as Connie Parker, and D.A. Clarke-Smith as Mr Roddis.

A dramatization of "Uncle Fred Flits By" by Christopher Sergel (under the pseudonym Perry Clark) was published in 1949 by Dramatic Publishing Co., Chicago.

The American television series Hollywood Opening Night adapted the story into the episode "Uncle Fred Flits By", which was originally broadcast 15 March 1953. David Niven portrayed Uncle Fred, and Robert Nichols portrayed Pongo. Among the other cast members were James Lilburn, Dawn Addams, Margaret Dumont, Eric Snowden, and Mollie Glessing. Niven and Nichols also portrayed Uncle Fred and Pongo in a 1955 episode of Four Star Playhouse that adapted "Uncle Fred Flits By", with Norma Varden as Mrs Tarmigan (sic), Jennifer Raine as Julia, Leon Tyler as Robinson, Alex Frazer as Mr Tarmigan, and Tudor Owen as Roddis.

The story was adapted into a radio drama in 1955, broadcast on the BBC Home Service, with D. A. Clarke-Smith as Uncle Fred, Derek Hart as Pongo, Brian Haines as Wilberforce Robinson, Alison Leggatt as Connie Parker, T. St. John Barry as Claude Parker, Joan Harrison as Julia Parker, and Edward Jewesbury as Mr Roddis. Clarke-Smith had voiced Mr Roddis in the 1939 radio adaptation.

The BBC adapted the story for television as part of the television series Comedy Playhouse. Adapted and produced by Michael Mills, it starred Wilfrid Hyde-White as Uncle Fred and Jonathan Cecil as Pongo. The 25-minute show was first broadcast on 16 June 1967. The cast included Avis Bunnage as Connie Parker, George Pensotti as Wilberforce Robinson, Gordon Rollings as Claude Parker, Janina Faye as Julia Parker, and Ballard Berkeley as Mr Roddie.

It was adapted in the first part of the six-part 1994 BBC radio adaptation of Uncle Dynamite. The cast included Richard Briers as Uncle Fred, Hugh Grant as Pongo, Paul Eddington as the narrator, Jacqueline Tong as Connie, John Evitts as Claude, Felicity Montagu as Julia, and David Howarth as Wilberforce.

Actor John Lithgow performs this story, along with Ring Lardner's short story "Haircut", in his one-man play titled Stories by Heart (Broadway, 2018).

== See also ==
- A list of stories featuring Uncle Fred and Pongo
