= Pigs Have Wings =

1952 novel by P. G. Wodehouse

- First edition
- Author: P. G. Wodehouse
- Language: English
- Genre: Comic novel
- Publisher: Doubleday (US); Herbert Jenkins (UK)
- Publication date: 16 October 1952 (US); 31 October 1952 (UK)
- Publication place: United Kingdom
- Media type: Print (hardback & paperback)
- Preceded by: "Birth of a Salesman" (short), Full Moon (novel)
- Followed by: Service With a Smile

Pigs Have Wings is a novel by P. G. Wodehouse, which first appeared as a serial in Collier's Weekly between 16 August and 20 September 1952. It was first published as a book in the United States on 16 October 1952 by Doubleday & Company, New York, and in the United Kingdom on 31 October 1952 by Herbert Jenkins, London. It is the seventh novel set at Blandings Castle.

== Plot introduction ==
The absent minded Lord Emsworth finds himself once again embroiled in fierce rivalry in the pig-rearing arena with his neighbour, the obese baronet Sir Gregory Parsloe-Parsloe. With Emsworth's champion Empress of Blandings in line for a third straight victory in the local show and Parsloe bringing in a ringer, suspicions run high. Meanwhile, Blandings has its full complement of romantic entanglements. The ever-resourceful Gally is on hand to help out.

== Plot summary ==
Lord Emsworth, his brother Galahad and butler Beach, hearing that devious neighbour Sir Gregory Parsloe-Parsloe has done the unthinkable and brought in a new and enormous pig from Kent, are in turmoil. Galahad and Beach are desperate to secure their savings, confidently invested in a wager on the mighty Empress, while Emsworth is as ever suspicious of his gloating neighbour.

Parsloe, meanwhile, is regretting becoming engaged to Gloria Salt, who has put him on a diet. His suspicions of Galahad lead him to put his pig man, George Cyril Wellbeloved, on a drink-ban too, a move of which Wellbeloved wholeheartedly disapproves; he also, on Connie's advice, orders a large quantity of "Slimmo", a slimming product, to aid his diet. Hearing about this suspicious purchase, a worried Galahad calls in Beach's niece Maudie, an old acquaintance and now proprietor of a Detective Agency, to keep an eye on things.

Penelope Donaldson heads up to London for the day, planning to meet up with her man, under cover of a dinner with an old friend of her father's. Jerry Vail, however, is forced to entertain his old flame Gloria Salt and cancels the date. Salt tells him Emsworth needs a secretary, and suggests talking pig to the Earl will get him the cash he needs to buy into a health farm and make his fortune.

Vail heads to Blandings, but Connie is suspicious, having heard his name when he called to cancel his date with Penny. Penny is furious, having been taken to Mario's by Orlo Vosper and seen Jerry with the attractive Gloria. When Jerry explains, she is suitably chastised, especially as, thinking her man had betrayed her, she had accepted Vosper's proposal of marriage.

When Wellbeloved visits Blandings to ask Gally to provide him with a drink (all the pubs in Market Blandings having been forbidden to serve him), Gally takes the opportunity to snatch Parsloe's pig, stashing it in the hut in the West Wood. Wellbeloved, finding the pig gone, nabs the Empress and puts her in the pen at Parsloe's place to cover up.

Vosper and Gloria Salt, their old love revived, run off together to be married, after Gally helps Vosper get out of being engaged to Penny, and Gloria writes to Parsloe ending their engagement. Wellbeloved spots Beach furtively heading for the shed, but his call to tell Parsloe of his discovery is intercepted by Gally, who has Beach move the pig to a nearby house, recently vacated by Gally's old friend "Fruity" Biffen.

Meanwhile, Emsworth, stricken with a cold, has been smitten by Maudie (posing as Mr Donaldson's old friend Mrs Bunbury), and writes a letter to her declaring his love, which he has Vail place in her room. She, meanwhile, pays a visit to Parsloe, with whom she once had an understanding, planning to give him a piece of her mind, but all is soon cleared up and the two become engaged. Emsworth, on hearing this, sends Vail to retrieve his letter, but has misdirected him into Connie's room; on finding Vail hiding in her closet, she promptly fires him.

Finding the Emsworth Arms uncomfortable, Vail lets the cottage with the pig in it. Fearing he will give the game away, Gally dashes round, but Vail has already been visited by a policeman and Wellbeloved. Gally removes the pig by car, but soon returns, having found the Empress in the Queen's sty. They head back to Blandings to tell Emsworth, leaving Beach, exhausted from cycling over, sleeping in the cottage. On their return, Parsloe is there, having been told by Wellbeloved that the Queen was in the kitchen and had Beach arrested for stealing his pig.

Gally explains to Parsloe that the Empress is in the kitchen, and the Queen in her sty, scuppering Parsloe. He then persuades Emsworth to invest in Vail's health farm, in gratitude for having found the pig, and Connie gives him another £500 for Beach, to prevent him suing Parsloe for wrongful arrest. Meanwhile, Parsloe's butler Binstead, having been refused a refund on the Slimmo no longer needed by his master, feeds it to the pig in the sty, thinking she is still the Empress...

== Characters ==
- The Earl of Emsworth, the absent-minded master of Blandings
  - The Hon. Galahad Threepwood, Emsworth's dashing brother
  - Lady Constance Keeble, Emsworth's formidable sister
  - Empress of Blandings, Emsworth's prize pig
    - Monica Simmons, Emsworth's Amazonian pig girl
- Sir Gregory Parsloe-Parsloe, their neighbour, another pig-keeper
  - The Queen of Matchingham, Parsloe's new pig
    - George Cyril Wellbeloved, Parsloe's pig man, poached from Emsworth
  - Herbert Binstead, Parsloe's butler
- Penelope Donaldson, younger sister of Emsworth's son Freddie's wife
  - Jerry Vail, the man she loves
- Gloria Salt, a beautiful and athletic woman, engaged to Parsloe
- Orlo, Lord Vosper, a handsome nobleman, old friend of Jerry and Gloria
- Sebastian Beach, dignified head butler at the Castle
  - Maudie, his much-married niece

== Publication history ==
The Collier's serial of Pigs Have Wings was published in six parts and illustrated by Robert Fawcett.

The first US edition dust jacket was illustrated by Earl Oliver Hurst, and the black and white photograph of Wodehouse on the back panel was by Ray Platnick. The first UK edition dust jacket was illustrated by "Sax".

The last chapter of the novel was included in the 1962 anthology Life and Laughter, More Wit and Humour, edited by Michael Barsley and published by Phoenix House, London.

== Adaptations ==
In 1989, the book was adapted as a radio drama in four parts as part of the Blandings radio series.
