= Empress of Blandings =

Fictional pig in P. G. Wodehouse stories

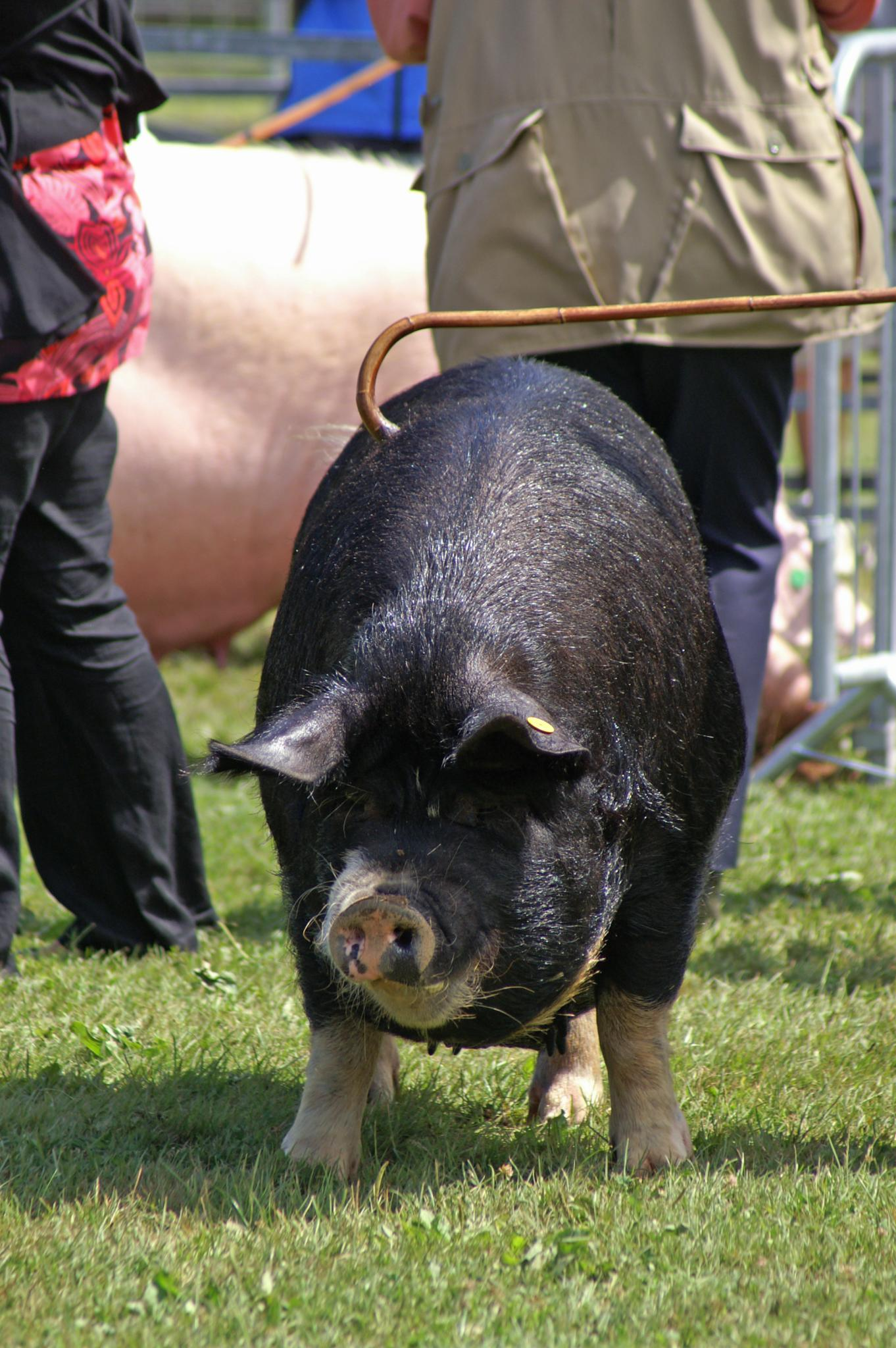
A Berkshire sow similar to The Empress of Blandings (but much thinner)

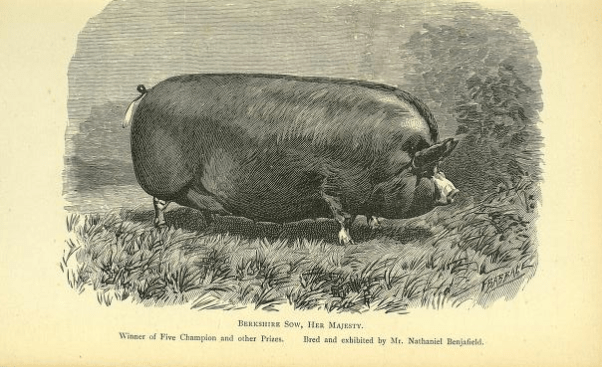
An 1870 drawing of a champion Berkshire sow similar to The Empress of Blandings

Empress of Blandings is a fictional pig, featured in many of the Blandings Castle novels and stories by P. G. Wodehouse. Owned by the doting Lord Emsworth, the Empress is an enormous black Berkshire sow, who wins many prizes in the "Fat Pigs" class at the local Shropshire Agricultural Show, and is the subject of many plots and schemes, generally involving her kidnap for various purposes. In 2005 Hall & Woodhouse, the Dorset-based Brewers of Badger beer, named a public house in Hampshire in honour of the Empress.

== Appearances ==
Once the pig bug has taken hold of her master (Emsworth had previously been infatuated with his garden, but, from Pig-hoo-o-o-o-ey, there seems to be no more time for his garden any more), the Empress becomes a regular feature in the Blandings books, playing some part in most of the subsequent stories:

- Pig-hoo-o-o-o-ey (1927, included in Blandings Castle and Elsewhere, 1935)
- Summer Lightning (1929)
- Heavy Weather (1933)
- Uncle Fred in the Springtime (1939)
- Full Moon (1947)
- Pigs Have Wings (1952)
- Service with a Smile (1961)
- Galahad at Blandings (1965)
- A Pelican at Blandings (1969)
- Sunset at Blandings (1977)

== Keepers ==
In the course of the Blandings saga, the Empress is tended to by a large and disparate bunch of pig-keepers, most of them rather unappealing types who, unsurprisingly, smell strongly of pig.

- George Cyril Wellbeloved, her first and best-known keeper, is a rather unreliable sort, a little too fond of drink and lacking the old feudal loyalty; he defects to the rival camp of Sir Gregory Parsloe-Parsloe for a time, later returning to Blandings (in Service with a Smile), only to further betray Emsworth by joining yet another plot to kidnap the Empress.
- Pirbright, not to be confused with Catsmeat Potter-Pirbright who holds the post throughout Summer Lightning and Heavy Weather, is a taciturn man does the job in a solid manner, and enjoys a good scrap with would-be pig-nappers. He communicates mainly in grunts and other guttural sounds.
- Edwin Pott is an elderly, gnome-like man with no roof to his mouth (rendering his speech rather hard to follow), who appears in Full Moon.
- Monica Simmons, rather worryingly niece to Parsloe-Parsloe, is nevertheless a highly capable girl despite referring to the Empress as a "piggy-wiggy". Graduate of an Agricultural College, Amazonian Miss Simmons tends her charge well in Pigs Have Wings, and returns to the post in Galahad at Blandings, only to elope at the end with a nephew of Lord Emsworth.
- Cuthbert Price, who takes over from Simmons, for A Pelican at Blandings.

== Adventures ==
"Pig-hoo-o-o-o-ey", wherein we first meet the noble beast, tells of how she misses her first keeper, Wellbeloved, when he is sent to jail for a spell; her pining is worrisome to her master, with the big show approaching, until she is pepped up by James Belford's hog-calling techniques, returning to her trough with enough gusto to take her first Silver Medal.

Soon afterwards, to Emsworth's disgust, Wellbeloved defects to Sir Gregory Parsloe-Parsloe, whose own animal the Pride of Matchingham is the Empress' biggest rival. In the novels Summer Lightning and Heavy Weather, while she is under the care of Pirbright, she becomes the subject of various schemes: first stolen by Ronnie Fish (who has upset his uncle by bouncing a tennis ball on her back and hopes to get back into his good books by "finding" her again), she is stashed in a gamekeeper's cottage in the woods, and fed by the admirable Beach, but later moved by Hugo Carmody to a caravan owned by Rupert Baxter.

In Heavy Weather, she finds Galahad Threepwood's notorious memoirs, hidden in her custom-built new sty by Percy Pilbeam, and eats the whole book, and not long afterward finds herself in the dicky of Ronnie Fish's car, as he threatens to run off with her if her master refuses to fund Fish's elopement. Throughout this, both Emsworth and Gally suspect Parsloe-Parsloe of being behind all the foul play. The book opens with the Empress about to attempt her second silver medal and the book closes by implying that she won.

In Uncle Fred in the Springtime, she is once again taken captive, and hidden in a bathroom by the Duke of Dunstable, but flees when Lord Bosham lets off a shotgun in her vicinity.

In Full Moon, Bill Lister is twice hired to paint her portrait, and she is put in Veronica Wedge's bedroom for a time by Gally, while in Pigs Have Wings she spends some time at Matchingham Hall, home of Parsloe-Parsloe, having been stolen by the turncoat Wellbeloved in response to Gally's cunning theft of Parsloe's new pig, the Queen of Matchingham. Her subsequent rescue leaves her plenty of time to return to form, before her triumphant third Silver Medal.

In Service with a Smile, a Church Lad teases her with a potato on a piece of string, and Dunstable once again schemes to take her away from Lord Emsworth, planning to sell her to Lord Tilbury, but the plot (involving Lavender Briggs and Wellbeloved) is blocked by the dashing Uncle Fred.

In Galahad at Blandings, dastardly Huxley Winkworth, feeling she is overweight, plots to release her and give her some exercise. When he finally gets past Monica Simmons' able guard, he finds the Empress suffering from a hangover, Wilfred Allsop having dropped a flask of whisky into her trough the day before; she bites his finger, and Emsworth's fears that she may be in danger of infection prove priceless to his own happiness.
