= Sebastian Beach =

Fictional character in P. G. Wodehouse stories

Sebastian Beach is a fictional character in the Blandings stories by P. G. Wodehouse. He is the butler at Blandings Castle, seat of Lord Emsworth and his family, where he serves for over eighteen years.

== Inspiration ==
Beach's name was inspired by Beach Road, a road in the town of Emsworth, England, that leads to the seashore. The road is located near a cottage called Threepwood, which Wodehouse rented in the early 1900s.

== Background and character ==
Like all butlers in properly run Edwardian homes, Beach is always known by his surname. He is a heavy-set man, whose favourite pastime is drinking port in the pantry, though he occasionally switches to brandy during crises. He has a pleasant singing voice, a mellow baritone reminiscent of a cask of very old, dry sherry.

He is somewhat more emotional than Wodehouse's other famous domestic servant, Jeeves, although, when in the company of his masters, Beach generally limits himself to a slightly raised eyebrow, even when strongly moved. According to Richard Usborne, Beach is a hypochondriac in Something Fresh and complains about corns, an ingrowing toenail, swollen joints, nervous headaches, and the lining of his stomach. However, this is not the case in the later books.

Before joining the staff at Blandings, he was employed by the somewhat eccentric Major-General Magnus. He had grown very proud of the castle and of its museum. A discerning man, he regrets Lady Constance's fondness for artistic types, finding their dress sense inappropriate. He is also very proud of the Hon. Galahad, who, in the general opinion of the Servants' Hall, sheds lustre on the Castle.

He is very fond of Ronnie Fish, whom he has known from childhood and used to take fishing on the lake; he is particularly malleable to that youth's persuasions. Ever grateful for Ronnie's reliable racing tips, he is at one point persuaded to assist Ronnie in keeping the Empress of Blandings in a cottage in the woods. The strain on his conscience is, however, grave. He later repeats the feat, helping Fish load the pig into the dicky of his car.

He has similar relationships with Angela, whom he has also known since her childhood and for whose entertainment he (quite convincingly) impersonated a hippopotamus, as well as with Millicent, who also sported in Beach's pantry when a child; he cut elephants out of paper for her and taught her tricks with pieces of string.

His mother lives in Eastbourne; and his niece, Maudie, the bohemian of the family, ran away from home to become a barmaid at the old Criterion (where she was familiar with Galahad and Sir Gregory Parsloe-Parsloe) under the name of Maudie Montrose; she later married several times before getting back together with her old flame "Tubby" Parsloe.

As mentioned in Galahad at Blandings, Beach won a choir boys' bicycle race in his youth, and recently won the Market Blandings Darts Tournament. He inherits the library of thriller novels that Freddie Threepwood collected before his marriage.

== Appearances ==
Beach plays some part in almost all of the Blandings stories. In early stories, such as Something Fresh and Leave It to Psmith, he is required to do little more than buttle, which he of course does with effortless dignity; in later works, he plays a more significant role in the action.

He decides to give notice on one occasion, because of Lord Emsworth's beard, an admittedly dubious fixture which Beach fears will ruin Emsworth's respectability in the community. Since he cannot honorably criticise his employer while serving as a butler, Beach makes the painful decision to resign first, but is prevented from doing so by his master's decision to shave, in "Lord Emsworth Acts for the Best". He is placed in a similar position soon afterward, when Emsworth expects him to stand in the moonlight practising pig-calls, a practice he considers beneath his dignity, but is persuaded to overcome his foibles by the presence of young Angela, in "Pig-hoo-o-o-o-ey".

His strength of character is sorely tested, when called upon by Ronnie Fish to help in his schemes involving the Empress, in Summer Lightning and Heavy Weather; he later does indeed resign, after shooting Rupert Baxter with an air gun. However, Emsworth cannot do without his butler, and he assures his faithful servant of continued employment, in "The Crime Wave at Blandings".

He buttles on quietly through Uncle Fred in the Springtime and Full Moon, but returns to the fore in Pigs Have Wings, where not only does he celebrate a birthday, but he is also called on once again to assist in the affairs of the Empress and her challengers, feeding one of Parsloe-Parsloe's pigs when it has been kidnapped by Galahad, and moving it when its location has been discovered by the enemy camp. His pantry is the scene for several councils of war between Gally, Beach and Penelope Donaldson, while his niece Maudie pays a visit to the castle under an assumed name.

In the later short "Sticky Wicket at Blandings", his position at the castle is again threatened, when Lady Constance decides he has become rather slow and wheezy in his old age, and considers replacing him with a younger, smarter butler. Her scheme is foiled after Gally persuades Beach to undertake a daring and dangerous night-time rescue of his master from the clutches of Colonel Fanshawe.

== Portrayals ==
Television

- Felix Felton played Beach in a televised play based on the short story "Pig-hoo-o-o-o-ey" in 1954. Raymond Rollett portrayed the character in televised plays adapted from "Pig-hoo-o-o-o-ey" and "Lord Emsworth and the Girl Friend" in 1956.
- In the BBC's 1967 series of Blandings short-story adaptations, broadcast as the first series of The World of Wodehouse, Stanley Holloway played Beach.
- John Savident portrayed Beach in the 1981 television film Thank You, P. G. Wodehouse.
- In the 1995 television film Heavy Weather made by the BBC and partners, broadcast in the United States by PBS, Beach was played by Roy Hudd.
- In the 2013–2014 BBC series Blandings, he was played by Mark Williams in the first series and Tim Vine in the second series.

Film

- In the 1933 film Leave It to Me, Beach was played by Syd Crossley.
- Beach was portrayed by Miles Malleson in the 1933 film Summer Lightning.

Radio

- In 1939, J. B. Rowe voiced Beach in a radio dramatisation of "The Crime Wave at Blandings".
- Ralph Truman portrayed Beach in 1940 BBC radio plays adapted from "Pig-hoo-o-o-o-ey" and "Lord Emsworth Acts for the Best".
- Beach was portrayed by Ellis Dale in the 1981 BBC Radio 4 adaptation of Leave It to Psmith.
- In the 1985–1992 Blandings radio series, Beach was voiced in different episodes by Lockwood West, Timothy Bateson, John Rapley, and Harold Innocent.
- In 1999, Derwent Watson voiced Beach in a radio adaptation of the novel Full Moon.
- In Blandings radio adaptations dramatised by Archie Scottney and broadcast on BBC Radio 4, Beach was portrayed by Morgan Sheppard in Something Fresh (2009), Tim Pigott-Smith in Summer Lightning (2010), Kenneth Danziger in Uncle Fred in the Springtime (2012), and Lloyd Owen in Leave it to Psmith (2020).
