= The Crime Wave at Blandings =

- Short story by P. G. Wodehouse
- Country: United Kingdom
- Language: English
- Genre: Comedy

Publication
- Publisher: Saturday Evening Post (US); Strand (UK)
- Media type: Print (magazine)
- Publication date: 10 and 17 October 1936 (US); January 1937 (UK)

"The Crime Wave at Blandings" is a short story by P. G. Wodehouse that first appeared in the United States in two parts, in the October 10 and October 17, 1936 editions of the Saturday Evening Post, and in the United Kingdom in the January 1937 issue of the Strand (as "Crime Wave at Blandings"). It was included in the collection Lord Emsworth and Others (1937), and provided the title to the U.S. equivalent of that collection.

The story was a rewritten version of an older piece, entitled "Creatures of Impulse", which had appeared in the Strand in October 1914, and in the U.S. in McClure's that same month.

"The Crime Wave at Blandings" is set at Blandings Castle, home of Lord Emsworth, and features several other recurring characters.

== Plot ==
Lord Emsworth's sister, Lady Constance, has decided that Emsworth's grandson George needs a tutor to keep him in line over the summer holidays and chooses Rupert Baxter, Emsworth's former secretary. Emsworth is worried that Constance is trying to get the controlling and unpleasant Baxter reinstated as his secretary. George, who does not want to be tutored during the summer holidays, dislikes Baxter, and Emsworth sympathizes with George. Meanwhile, Lord Emsworth's niece Jane is engaged to George Abercrombie. Constance disapproves since Abercrombie does not have money or a job, and wants Jane to marry someone else. Lord Emsworth previously agreed to give Abercrombie the position of land agent at Blandings, but Constance pushes Emsworth, who just wants to be left alone so he can read Whiffle on The Care Of The Pig, to rescind the job offer. This dismays Jane.

The butler Beach brings an airgun and a box of ammunition to Emsworth. The gun was confiscated from young George on Lady Constance's instructions. George shot Baxter in the seat of the trousers while Baxter was tying his shoes. Emsworth again sympathizes with George. He reminisces about a time in his youth when his sister Julia borrowed his airgun to shoot her governess, and Beach mentions that he also had an airgun when he was young. Later, Emsworth sees Baxter outside bending over to pick up a cigarette. Acting on an impulse inspired by his childhood memories, Emsworth shoots Baxter with the airgun through a window. Baxter angrily comes into the room, thinking that George shot him again. Constance, however, suspects that Emsworth shot Baxter. Jane saw Emsworth shoot Baxter and threatens to tell Constance unless he writes a letter to Abercrombie giving him the land agent job. Emsworth writes the letter for her.

Baxter eavesdropped on their conversation and knows Emsworth shot him. To keep Baxter from telling Constance, Emsworth reluctantly offers him his old job as secretary, which Baxter gladly accepts. However, Beach later delivers a note from Baxter in which he declines the job and says he will leave Blandings. Emsworth fears Baxter has decided to tell Constance after all, and Jane advises him to deny everything Baxter says. Furthermore, Beach announces he is resigning. Constance admits she shot Beach with George's airgun on an impulse. Though Emsworth had thought he remembered Julia shooting the governess, it had actually been Constance. Emsworth is alarmed about their indispensable butler resigning but relieved that Constance can hardly reproach him now.

In front of Constance, Baxter accuses Emsworth of shooting him, which Emsworth denies, and says he was willing to return as secretary until Emsworth shot him a second time, though Emsworth only shot him once. Constance wants Baxter to stay, but Emsworth insists that Baxter will go, and that Jane will marry Abercrombie as she wants to. Beach tells Emsworth that he is resigning because he acted on an impulse and shot Baxter (though Baxter mistakenly thought Emsworth shot him again). He is not resigning because of Constance and says her shot actually missed. Emsworth convinces Beach to stay by telling him that Baxter is leaving, and decides to test his aim by again shooting Baxter through a window. Baxter shouts and immediately leaves on his motorcycle. Beach raises a glass of port in a toast to Emsworth's success.

== Publication history ==
"Creatures of Impulse", the original story which "The Crime Wave at Blandings" was rewritten from, was published in October 1914 in the Strand with illustrations by T. Victor Hall. It was published in the same month in McClure's with illustrations by Lucius Wolcott Hitchcock. "Creatures of Impulse" is not set at Blandings, and does not feature any of the characters from the Blandings stories. The story was not published in book form until it was included in the 1993 collection Plum Stones, with commentary by Tony Ring.

In "Creatures of Impulse", the main character, Sir Godfrey Tanner, has a valet named Jevons, who is very competent and usually performs his duties flawlessly. According to David A. Jasen's biography of P. G. Wodehouse, Jevons was a predecessor to Wodehouse's well-known character Jeeves, who is also a very competent valet.

"The Crime Wave at Blandings" was rewritten from "Creatures of Impulse" and was published more than twenty years after the original story. "The Crime Wave at Blandings" was published in October 1936 in two parts in the Saturday Evening Post, with illustrations by Charles LaSalle. It was published in The Strand Magazine in January 1937, with illustrations by Gilbert Wilkinson.

The story was collected in The Best of Wodehouse, a 1949 collection of Wodehouse stories selected by Scott Meredith, published in the US by Pocket Books. It was included in the 1981 collection Wodehouse on Crime, published by Ticknor & Fields in the US and edited by D. R. Bensen with a foreword by Isaac Asimov. The UK anthology In Praise of Humour, published by Muller in 1949 and edited by Neville Hilditch, included an excerpt from "The Crime Wave at Blandings".

== Adaptations ==
A radio dramatisation of "The Crime Wave at Blandings" aired in 1939, with C. V. France as Lord Emsworth, Thea Holme as Jane, J. B. Rowe as Beach, Gladys Young as Lady Constance, Carleton Hobbs as Rupert Baxter, and Robert Holland as George. It was produced by John Cheatle.

"The Crime Wave at Blandings" was adapted for television as an episode of The World of Wodehouse in 1967, under the title "Lord Emsworth and the Crime Wave at Blandings".

In 1985, the story was adapted into two episodes of the Blandings radio series.

"The Crime Wave at Blandings" was adapted for television again in 2013, as the fourth episode in the series Blandings.

== See also ==
- List of Wodehouse's Blandings shorts
- Complete list of the Blandings books
