= Sticky Wicket at Blandings =

- Short story by P. G. Wodehouse
- Country: United States
- Language: English
- Genre: Comedy

Publication
- Publisher: Playboy
- Media type: Print (magazine)
- Publication date: October 1966

"Sticky Wicket at Blandings" is a short story by P. G. Wodehouse, which first appeared, under the title "First Aid for Freddie", in the United States in the October 1966 issue of Playboy magazine. Part of the Blandings Castle canon, it features the absent-minded peer Lord Emsworth, and was included in the collection Plum Pie (1966). It was published, under the title "First Aid for Freddie", in the United Kingdom in the April 1967 issue of Argosy, after being published in Plum Pie in the UK.

== Plot summary ==
Freddie Threepwood is back at Blandings on Dog-Joy business, and his wife Aggie, finding country life a little dull, has headed to the French Riviera. Freddie has befriended Valerie Fanshawe, in hopes of persuading her father, local hunting bigwig Colonel Fanshawe, to invest in Freddie's dog biscuits for his sizeable pack of hounds.

Gally warns his nephew Freddie of the dangers of consorting with attractive young girls while his wife is away, but Freddie, hungry for the sale, opts to give Valerie an Alsatian she covets, although the dog belongs to Aggie - he believes he can replace it without her noticing. As Freddie leaves with his gift, Gally hears worrying news - his sister Connie is thinking about sacking venerable butler Beach, who has become a little wheezy in his old age.

Freddie gets a telegram from his wife, informing him of her plan to return to Blandings the following day, and in his shock on reading it tumbles down the stairs, taking Gally with him. They are both laid up with sprained ankles, so Gally insists his unwilling brother Clarence must go to Marling Hall to retrieve the dog by stealth.

Gally is visited in his sickbed by Valerie, who reveals that the dog has upset her father by attacking his beloved spaniel, and that she has thus returned it. Beach then informs him that Colonel Fanshawe has telephoned, requesting Lord Emsworth's judicial services as he has caught a prowler lurking outside his house. Realising Emsworth has been captured, Gally sends Beach to the rescue, armed with a Mickey Finn to knock out the Fanshawes' butler.

Beach returns, somewhat shaken but successful, and when Connie brings up the idea of replacing him, Gally easily silences her by telling the tale of Emsworth's imprisonment in Fanshawe's coal-cellar, and Beach's full knowledge of this potential embarrassment to the family name.

== Publication history ==
Under the title "First Aid for Freddie", the story was illustrated by Bill Charmatz in Playboy. In Argosy, the story was published with photos of Ralph Richardson as Lord Emsworth and Stanley Holloway as Beach from the 1967 Blandings Castle series of the television series The World of Wodehouse.

== Adaptations ==
The story was adapted into the fifth episode of the second series of Blandings, titled "Sticky Wicket at Blandings". It first aired on 16 March 2014. The cast included Timothy Spall as Lord Emsworth, Jennifer Saunders as Lady Constance, Jack Farthing as Freddie, Tim Vine as Beach, Ron Donachie as McAllister, James Fleet as Colonel Fanshawe, and Sophie Colquhoun as Valerie Fanshawe.

== See also ==
- List of Wodehouse's Blandings shorts
- Complete list of the Blandings stories
