= Major Brabazon-Plank =

Fictional character in P. G. Wodehouse stories

Major Brabazon-Plank (possibly later Major Plank) is a fictional character created by British comic writer P. G. Wodehouse, being a famed explorer who led an expedition up the Amazon but is afraid of babies.

Major Brabazon-Plank (who appears in the Uncle Fred novel Uncle Dynamite) and Major Plank (who appears in the Jeeves novels Stiff Upper Lip, Jeeves and Aunts Aren't Gentlemen) have been interpreted by some Wodehouse scholars as being the same character, while others have described them as being two similar but separate characters.

== Overview ==
In Uncle Dynamite, Major Brabazon-Plank (also called Major Plank) is a famed explorer who led at least one expedition up the Amazon River in Brazil. He is a fat, pear-shaped man and a perpetual eater. He was educated at Eton, where he was called "Bimbo". While in Peru, Major Plank judged a bonny baby competition, where the mother of one of the honourable mentions was unhappy with the results and stabbed him in the leg. (He will show the scar when asked.) This experience has instilled in him a lifelong phobia of babies and marriage ('as marriages lead to bonny babies, and bonny babies lead to bonny baby competitions').

He has recently come back from leading an expedition up the Amazon with Bill Oakshott. Visiting Ashenden Manor, he finds Uncle Fred, whom he knew at Eton, usurping his identity.

In Stiff Upper Lip, Jeeves and Aunts Aren't Gentlemen, Major Plank is a retired explorer. An elderly, tanned, square-faced man, he was an explorer in Brazil and now lives in a house that he inherited from his godfather in Hockley-cum-Meston. He is devoted to rugby football and was educated at Haileybury, where he had the nickname "Barmy". He breeds cocker spaniels and eats nonfattening protein bread. He was once scarred in the leg by the mother of an Honourable Mention in a Bonny Babies contest he judged in Peru, and is now strongly averse to marriage and babies. In South Africa, he hitched-hiked from Johannesburg to Cape Town to avoid being married.

In the first Jeeves novel in which he appears, he sells a black amber statuette he obtained in the Congo to Sir Watkyn Bassett, and wants to call the police on Bertie Wooster trying to sell it back to him. Jeeves (as Inspector Witherspoon) diverts the call to the police by naming Bertie as Alpine Joe and takes Bertie away. Major Plank also seeks a prop forward for the local rugby team. He finds this in Bertie's old friend, the Reverend Harold 'Stinker' Pinker, to whom he gives a vicarage. In the latter novel, he is a visitor haunting Bertie Wooster, the Major trying to remember where they had met before. He suffers from a poor memory as an after-effect of having contracted malaria during his time in Brazil.

== Quotes ==
All Marriages are disastrous.... They lead to bonny babies, and bonny babies lead to bonny baby competitions.

If she'd [Madeline Bassett] have seen as many native chiefs' wives as I have, she wouldn't want to make such an ass of herself. Dickens of a life they lead, those women. Nothing to do but grind maize meal and have bonny babies.

I'm strongly opposed to anyone marrying anybody, but if you are going to marry someone, you unquestionably save something from the wreck by marrying a woman who knows what to do with a joint of beef.

== Stories ==
Major Brabazon-Plank (or Major Plank) is featured in:

- Uncle Dynamite (1948) - an Uncle Fred novel (as Major Brabazon-Plank)
- Stiff Upper Lip, Jeeves (1963) - a Jeeves novel (as Major Plank)
- Aunts Aren't Gentlemen (1974, U.S. title: The Cat-nappers) - a Jeeves novel (as Major Plank)

== Adaptations ==
Donald Hewlett voiced Major Brabazon-Plank in the 1994 BBC radio adaptation of Uncle Dynamite.

Major Plank was portrayed by Norman Rodway in the Jeeves and Wooster episode "Trouble at Totleigh Towers". Ronald Fraser portrayed Major Plank in the 1980–1981 radio dramatisation of Stiff Upper Lip, Jeeves, part of the BBC radio series What Ho! Jeeves. The character was voiced by Michael York in the 2018 BBC radio dramatisation of the same novel.
