= Uncle Fred =

Fictional character in P. G. Wodehouse stories

Frederick Altamont Cornwallis Twistleton, 5th Earl of Ickenham, commonly known as Uncle Fred, is a fictional character who appears in comedic short stories and novels written by P. G. Wodehouse between 1935 and 1961. An energetic and mischievous old chap, his talent for trouble is the bane of his nephew Pongo Twistleton's life.

== Appearances ==
The Uncle Fred stories comprise the following (one short story followed by four novels, two of which are set at Blandings Castle):

- "Uncle Fred Flits By" (1935) – included in the collection Young Men in Spats, (1936)
- Uncle Fred in the Springtime (1939) – a Blandings story
- Uncle Dynamite (1948)
- Cocktail Time (1958)
- Service with a Smile (1961) – a Blandings story

== Background and character ==
Uncle Fred is a tall, slim, distinguished-looking man, with a jaunty moustache, and an "alert and enterprising eye". As a child he gambolled at Mitching Hill, his Uncle Willoughby's estate just outside London, which later became the suburb of Valley Fields; it was there that he shot the gardener in the trousers seat with his bow and arrow, and threw up after his first cigar. In school, he bore the nickname "Barmy." (But Fred is not the "Barmy" of Wodehouse's Barmy in Wonderland.) He was a younger son, and therefore not expected to inherit his present title; he spent much time in America, working variously as a cowboy, a soda jerk, a newspaper reporter and a prospector in the Mojave Desert, before a number of deaths in the family left him heir to the Earldom. While in America, he was friends with James Schoonmaker, and his daughter Myra.

In later youth, he became a member of the riotous Pelican Club, and a good friend of Galahad Threepwood, in whose stead he is occasionally called to Blandings, to help Gally's brother Lord Emsworth out of a jam. He was also close to Claude "Mustard" Pott, the prominent bookie, and was favourite uncle to Pott's daughter Polly, who sported on the lawns of Ickenham Hall as a child.

His home is in Hampshire, where he lives quietly with his sponge Joyeuse and his American wife Jane, who at first permits him the occasional day or two in town, but later takes control of the family finances, leaving him only enough for "golf balls, self-respect and tobacco", and insists he stay in the country. This injunction comes as a relief to his nephew Pongo, who considers him a troublemaker and dreads his trips to London.

== Adventures ==
In an oft-referenced but never detailed anecdote, Uncle Fred once dragged his nephew Pongo to the Dog Races and was arrested within ten minutes of arriving ("I still say a wiser Magistrate would have been content with a mere caution.")

In "Uncle Fred Flits By", he involves Pongo in a complex situation involving someone else's house and a parrot.

His main talent is impersonation: by the end of this first outing, we hear of his having impersonated George Robinson, of 14 Nasturtium Road, East Dulwich (on the occasion of the trip to the Dog Races); a veterinarian come to clip the claws of a parrot at The Cedars, Mafeking Road, Mitching Hill; Mr Roddis, the resident of the same address; and Mr. J. B. Bulstrode, a neighbour of the same. He claims that, if given time, he would have impersonated the parrot as well, on broad impressionistic terms.

In Uncle Fred in the Springtime, when we next meet him, he cons slow-minded Lord Bosham out of his wallet just for the sake of it, and heads merrily down to Blandings Castle in the guise of Sir Roderick Glossop, with Pongo taking the role of his nephew and secretary, Basil. While there, he wraps up the affairs of Polly and her man, and Pongo's money worries, with a panache only Gally himself could rival; he even avoids his wife's finding out he has left home while she was away (tending her sick mother in the South of France), despite the wrath of his niece Valerie.

He has also masqueraded as Major Brabazon-Plank in Uncle Dynamite, the famed explorer, and as his older brother, a mining engineer. (In the argot of the English public school, the miner is Brabazon-Plank Major and the major is Brabazon-Plank Minor.)

His other exploits include shooting an old classmate's hat off with a Brazil nut with the precision of an Amazonian hunter (in Cocktail Time), and happily breaking up an engagement between his nephew Pongo and the quite unsuitable Hermione Bostock (in Uncle Dynamite). All of them have rendered said nephew in constant fear of his uncle, and permanently convinced him of his elder's lunacy.

In his last outing (Service with a Smile) Fred visits Blandings to help Lord Emsworth with his woes: his bossy sister Lady Constance Keeble, his scary secretary Lavender Briggs, his obnoxious houseguest the Duke of Dunstable, and a group of Church Lads permitted to camp on the property. But Fred has his own motivation: Pongo's friend, a curate, is in love with Connie's wealthy charge, Myra Schoonmaker. Without meeting him, Connie decided a poor curate was not an acceptable suitor and brought Myra away to Blandings to break up the romance. Fred employs his favorite strategy, bringing the curate along under an assumed name, and manages to unite the young lovers. Through various maneuvers he eventually alleviates Lord Emsworth's burdens.

== Adaptations ==
=== Television ===
The novel Uncle Dynamite was adapted for television as part of the NBC anthology series The Philco Television Playhouse. In the episode, which aired on 29 January 1950, Arthur Treacher portrayed Uncle Fred.

In the episode "Uncle Fred Flits By", adapted from the short story for the American television series Hollywood Opening Night, David Niven portrayed Uncle Fred, and Robert Nichols portrayed Pongo. The episode aired on 15 March 1953.

Niven and Nichols again portrayed Uncle Fred and Pongo in an episode of the CBS anthology series Four Star Playhouse that adapted "Uncle Fred Flits By". The episode was originally broadcast on 5 May 1955.

"Uncle Fred Flits By" was dramatised for television as an episode of the BBC television series Comedy Playhouse. In the episode, Wilfrid Hyde-White portrayed Uncle Fred and Jonathan Cecil portrayed Pongo. It first aired on 16 June 1967.

He was portrayed by Ballard Berkeley in the 1981 BBC television film Thank You, P. G. Wodehouse.

Scenes from Uncle Fred in the Springtime were adapted into an episode of the Blandings television series, "Throwing Eggs". While the episode does not feature Uncle Fred, Pongo does appear in the episode, portrayed by Mathew Baynton. The episode first aired on 16 February 2014.

Uncle Fred is mentioned by his title, Lord Ickenham, in the third episode of the first season of Jeeves and Wooster starring Hugh Laurie and Stephen Fry.

=== Radio ===
A radio drama based on "Uncle Fred Flits By" was broadcast on the BBC Home Service on 14 October 1939. The radio drama starred Cecil Trouncer as Uncle Fred and Philip Cunningham as Pongo.

"Uncle Fred Flits By" was adapted as a radio drama in 1955, broadcast on the BBC Home Service, with D. A. Clarke-Smith as Uncle Fred and Derek Hart as Pongo.

The novel Uncle Dynamite was dramatised as a serial in six half-hour episodes for BBC Radio 4 in 1994, starring Richard Briers as Uncle Fred and Hugh Grant as Pongo.

Uncle Fred in the Springtime was adapted as a radio drama in two parts in 2012 for BBC Radio 4, with Alfred Molina as Uncle Fred, and Matthew Wolf as Pongo Twistleton.

=== Theatre ===
Actor John Lithgow has performed a one-man show "Stories by Heart" which includes a dramatic reading of the short story which first introduces Lord Ickenham, "Uncle Fred Flits By". The show was performed in New York at the Mitzi E. Newhouse Theater in 2008. It was also performed at the American Airlines Theatre in 2018.
