= Galahad Threepwood =

Fictional character in P. G. Wodehouse stories

The Honourable Galahad "Gally" Threepwood is a fictional character in the Blandings Castle stories by P. G. Wodehouse. Lord Emsworth's younger brother, a lifelong bachelor, Gally was, according to Beach, the Blandings butler, "somewhat wild as a young man". When he appears in the Blandings books, he is in his fifties, has thick grey hair and wears a black-rimmed monocle on a black ribbon.

== Life and character ==
Galahad is the only one of the Threepwood siblings never to have married. He is the younger brother of Lord Emsworth and has ten sisters, all but one of them (Lady Diana Phipps) disapprove of his lifestyle. His true love was Dolly Henderson, with whom he was in love from 1896 to 1898 but who, as a music-hall singer who wore pink tights, was not an appropriate bride for a man of his social status. His father sent him to South Africa to prevent him from marrying, following which he spent most of his life drinking heavily and getting up to mischief. A member of the notorious Pelican Club, he appears to have travelled widely and known many people.

The prospect of Galahad's writing his reminiscences causes a good deal of consternation among England's well-established upper-class because he had, in younger days, been "a notable lad about town," a partier, drinker, prankster, and ladies' man, and his stories are liable to embarrass his former comrades, most of whom have grown into respectable gentlemen. One particularly embarrassing story concerns Sir Gregory Parsloe-Parsloe and prawns, though we never learn many details of the incident, other than that it took place at Ascot, "the year Martingale won the Gold Cup".

His wildness makes him very popular with the members of the Blandings servants hall, who feel he sheds lustre on the castle, but less so with his sisters, who find him something of an embarrassment, particularly when recalling stories of their now-respectable friends. Despite the fact that he "apparently never went to bed until he was fifty", he is in remarkable shape, a sprightly, rosy, dapper man with bright eyes and a jaunty posture. His niece Millicent similarly remarks that it "is really […] an extraordinary thing that anyone who has had as good a time as he has can be so amazingly healthy."

Galahad is widely known as a "racy and compulsive raconteur".

== Appearances ==
Galahad appears in seven novels and a single short story:

- Summer Lightning (1929)
- Heavy Weather (1933)
- Full Moon (1947)
- Pigs Have Wings (1952)
- Galahad at Blandings (1965)
- "Sticky Wicket at Blandings", from Plum Pie (1966)
- A Pelican at Blandings (1969)
- Sunset at Blandings (1977)

Gally first appears in Summer Lightning, where he is staying at Blandings to work on his scandalous reminiscences. He appears not to have been a regular visitor to the castle, however, as Baxter, secretary to Lord Emsworth for some time, has never previously met him. Thereafter he becomes a regular visitor, frequently involved in the intrigues and conspiracies that invariably surround the place, generally filling the role of level-headed and resourceful saviour and the champion of youth and romance. In a private letter, P. G. Wodehouse regarded Galahad as "the best character in Summer Lighting".

In the two Blandings novels after Summer Lightning in which he does not play a part, his shoes are ably filled by his fellow-Pelican Uncle Fred (Lord Ickenham). In fact, it has been said that Ickenham lays down the pattern that Galahad follows. Uncle Fred's first appearance in a Blandings novel is Uncle Fred in the Springtime (1939), in which he arrives at the castle under an assumed name, bringing several other impostors with him. In the next Blandings novel, Full Moon (1947), critic Richard Usborne points out that "in patches Gally, [the novel's] real hero, acts and talks more like Lord Ickenham than himself. 'Spreading sweetness and light' is Lord Ickenham's specific role, but here, Wodehouse, seeming to forget, applies these words to Gally." Critic J. H. C. Morris agrees, "Gally becomes more and more like Lord Ickenham as the Blandings Saga progresses. In the later stories there is no one like him for telling the tale."

== Adaptations ==
=== Television ===
- In the 1995 BBC television film Heavy Weather, Galahad was portrayed by Richard Briers.
- In the 2013–2014 BBC series Blandings, he was played by Julian Rhind-Tutt.

=== Radio ===
- In the 1985–1992 Blandings radio series, Galahad was voiced by Ian Carmichael.
- Galahad was portrayed by Derwent Watson in the 1999 BBC radio dramatisation of Full Moon.
- Charles Dance portrayed Galahad in the 2010 BBC radio adaptation of Summer Lightning.
