= Cocktail Time =

1958 novel by P. G. Wodehouse

- First UK edition
- Author: P. G. Wodehouse
- Language: English
- Genre: Comic novel
- Publisher: Herbert Jenkins (UK); Simon & Schuster, Inc. (US)
- Publication date: 20 June 1958 (UK); 24 July 1958 (US)
- Publication place: United Kingdom
- Media type: Print

Cocktail Time is a comic novel by P. G. Wodehouse, first published in the United Kingdom on 20 June 1958 by Herbert Jenkins, London and in the United States on 24 July 1958 by Simon & Schuster, Inc., New York. A condensed version of the story was originally published in the Ladies' Home Journal (US) in one issue in April 1958. It is the third novel to feature Frederick Twistleton, Earl of Ickenham, better known as Uncle Fred. The characters "Oily" Carlisle and his wife Gertie have appeared previously in Hot Water (1932), while Albert Peasemarch appeared in The Luck of the Bodkins (1935).

== Plot ==
The story begins as Uncle Fred knocks off Sir Raymond Bastable’s top hat with a Brazil nut fired through the window of the Drones Club from a catapult. Sir Raymond assumes that the culprit was a young Drone, but is unsure how to respond, knowing that a letter to The Times would open him to ridicule, especially as he is about to stand for Parliament. Uncle Fred suggests writing a novel exposing the iniquities of the younger generation. The eventual novel, "Cocktail Time", which Bastable publishes under a pseudonym, becomes a succès de scandale after being condemned by a bishop. Afraid of being unmasked as the author, Bastable allows his ne'er-do-well nephew Cosmo Wisdom to take the credit, and the royalties, of the book. With his friend Gordon "Oily" Carlisle, and Carlisle's wife Gertie, Cosmo plots to blackmail Bastable, and writes a letter revealing the true author of "Cocktail Time". Much of the rest of the book is concerned with various characters' attempts to get hold of the letter.

The action moves to Dovetail Hammer, Berkshire, where Uncle Fred is staying with his godson Johnny Pearce. Johnny is in love with Belinda Farringdon, but needs £500 in order to marry her. Uncle Fred resolves to help, but for the time being is more concerned with retrieving the letter. It so happens that Sir Raymond Bastable is also living in Dovetail Hammer, with his sister Phoebe Wisdom, Cosmo's mother, and Sir Raymond's butler, Albert Peasemarch (who is secretly in love with Phoebe), as tenants of Johnny Pearce.

Oily travels to Dovetail Hammer and attempts to blackmail Sir Raymond, but Uncle Fred manages to extract the letter by posing as Inspector Jervis of the Yard. He then blackmails Bastable into treating Phoebe more kindly by keeping the letter himself. Cosmo and Bastable discover that the movie rights of the book could be worth a fortune. Cosmo changes his mind, deciding that he'd like to be the author of "Cocktail Time" after all. Needing the letter back, Cosmo proceeds to Dovetail Hammer.

Uncle Fred unwisely gives the letter to Albert Peasemarch for safekeeping. However, while drunk, Peasemarch reveals the letter's location to Cosmo. As Cosmo retrieves the letter, Oily and Gertie attack him, knocking him out, and steal the letter. She and Oily hide it in an imitation walnut cabinet, which is taken away to be auctioned. However, Uncle Fred finds the letter and removes it, allowing Oily and Cosmo to bid against each other fiercely. Uncle Fred extracts £500 from Sir Raymond in return for the letter, which he gives to Johnny, allowing Johnny to marry Belinda. Sir Raymond gets the movie rights to "Cocktail Time", and marries his longtime admirer Barbara Crowe, while Albert marries Phoebe.

== Publication history ==
Cocktail Time was published in April 1958 in the Ladies' Home Journal magazine with illustrations by Al Parker. One other Wodehouse story was published in the Ladies' Home Journal, The Return of Jeeves, in 1954.

The illustration on the first US edition dust jacket was by Robert Shore.

The story was included in the collection The World of Uncle Fred, published in August 1983 by Hutchinson, London.
