= Blandings (TV series) =

- Based on: P. G. Wodehouse's Blandings Castle stories
- Written by: Guy Andrews
- Starring: Timothy Spall; Jennifer Saunders; Mark Williams; Jack Farthing; Tim Vine
- Composer: Paul Honey
- Country of origin: United Kingdom
- Original language: English
- No. of series: 2
- No. of episodes: 13

Production
- Executive producers: Guy Andrews; Michele Buck; Damien Timmer; Kristian Smith
- Producer: Spencer Campbell
- Production location: Crom Castle
- Cinematography: Simon Archer
- Running time: 29 minutes
- Production company: Mammoth Screen

Original release
- Network: BBC One
- Release: 13 January 2013 – 30 March 2014

Blandings is a British comedy television series adapted by Guy Andrews from the Blandings Castle stories of P. G. Wodehouse. It was first broadcast on BBC One from 13 January 2013, and stars Timothy Spall, Jennifer Saunders, Jack Farthing, Tim Vine and Mark Williams. The series was produced with the partial financial assistance of the European Regional Development Fund.

== Plot ==
Set in 1929, the 9th Earl of Emsworth (Spall) resides at Blandings Castle, along with his imperious sister Connie (Saunders), his empty-headed son Freddie (Jack Farthing), and any number of houseguests, love-struck nieces and their boyfriends. Lord Emsworth would rather be left in peace with his prize pig The Empress, but his family is always at hand to complicate his life. Offering a reluctant helping hand is his loyal and long-suffering butler, Beach (Mark Williams/Tim Vine).

== Production ==
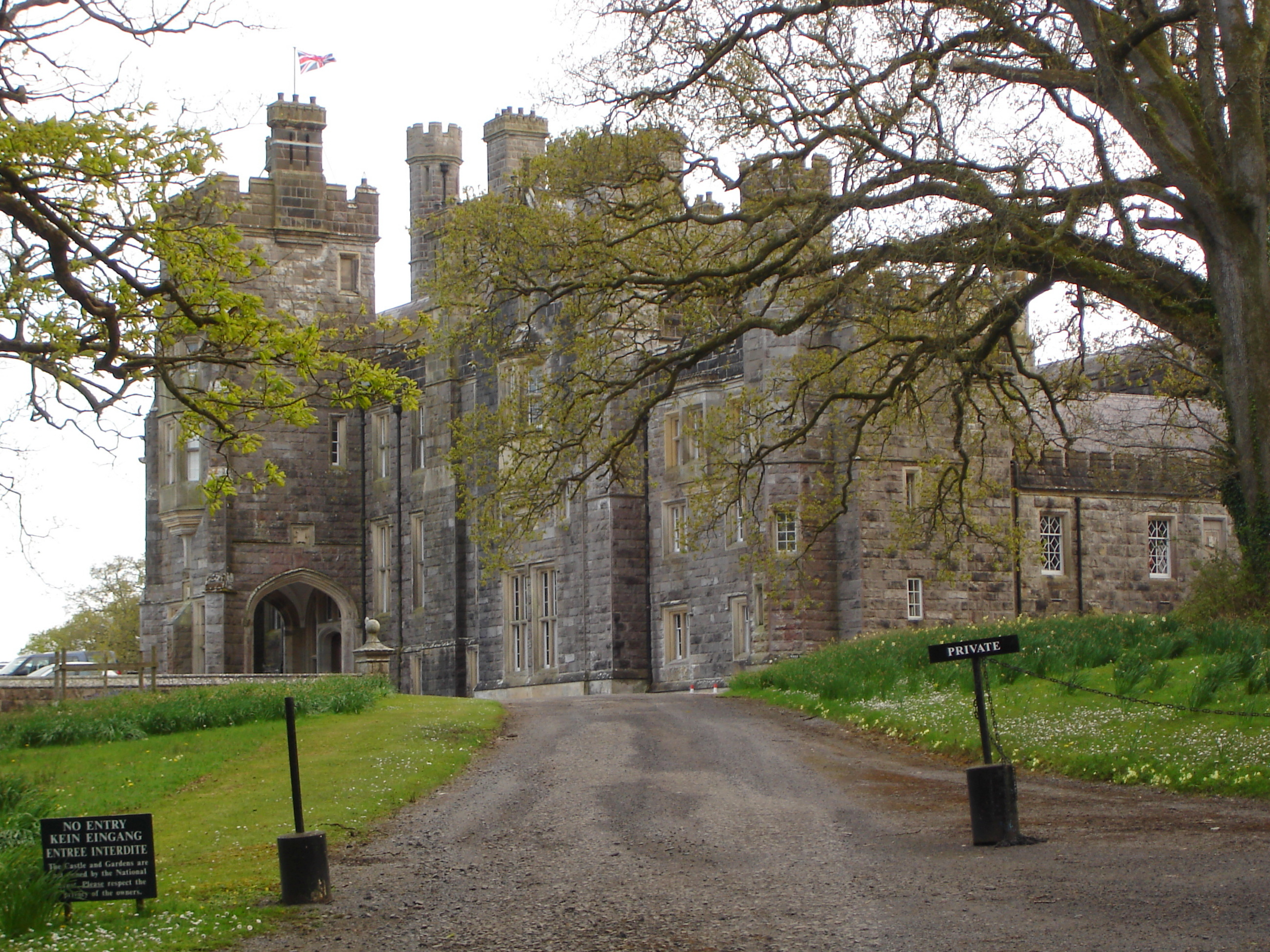
Crom Castle

The series was produced by Mammoth Screen and was filmed on location at Crom Castle, near Newtownbutler, in County Fermanagh, Northern Ireland. Some scenes were also filmed at Florence Court, a National Trust property near Kinawley in south-west County Fermanagh. The producer was Spencer Campbell and the director was Paul Seed. It was the first adaptation of Blandings for British television since the BBC's film of Wodehouse's novel Heavy Weather in 1995.

On 7 June 2013, BBC commissioner Danny Cohen confirmed that Blandings would return for a second series. The second series has seven episodes and began airing 16 February 2014.

On 24 October 2013, it was announced that Tim Vine would join the cast for the second series as Beach replacing Mark Williams.

== Cast and characters ==
=== Main ===
Second series cast: Tim Vine, Jennifer Saunders, Timothy Spall, Jack Farthing.

- Timothy Spall as Clarence Threepwood, 9th Earl of Emsworth
- Jennifer Saunders as Lady Constance Keeble
- Jack Farthing as The Hon. Frederick Threepwood
- Mark Williams as Sebastian Beach (series 1)
- Tim Vine as Sebastian Beach (series 2)

=== Recurring ===
- Ron Donachie as Angus McAllister
- Robert Bathurst as Sir Gregory Parsloe-Parsloe

== Episodes ==
=== Series 1 (2013) ===
No.	Title	Directed by	Written by	Original release date
1	"Pig-hoo-o-o-o-ey"	Paul Seed	Guy Andrews	13 January 2013
Lord Emsworth, keen that his fat pig the Empress of Blandings should win the 87th annual Shropshire Agricultural Show, is distraught when his pigman Wellbeloved is sent to prison for fourteen days for being drunk and disorderly, especially as the magistrate Sir Gregory Parsloe-Parsloe is his rival for the prize. The pig immediately goes off her feed and Emsworth is in no state to listen to his sister Constance's bleatings about his niece Angela breaking off her engagement from Lord Heacham in favour of the quite unsuitable Jimmy Belford, whom Emsworth himself always liked. Belford teaches Emsworth the master call, the "pig-hoo-o-o-o-ey" to which all pigs will respond. When Belford is also arrested, Emsworth forgets the call. He, Beach and Angela all try the call on the Empress, but to no avail. Just when all looks black, Freddie Threepwood orchestrates a temporary escape of Belford from prison to show them the call. To everyone's delight the Empress tucks heartily into her food and subsequently wins the contest. Based on the short story "Pig-hoo-o-o-o-ey". Guest cast: Tony Maudsley as Cyril Wellbeloved, B. J. Hogg as Constable Evans, Alice Orr-Ewing as Angela, Brendan Patricks as Lord Heacham, and James Norton as Jimmy Belford.
2	"The Go-getter"	Paul Seed	Guy Andrews	20 January 2013
Rupert Baxter has been hired by Connie to put the affairs of Blandings and Clarence in order. Baxter's draconian new rules quickly make him unpopular both with Emsworth and the staff of Blandings Castle. When Freddie falls for the dog-loving Pandora he realises he needs a dog and money to woo her. He borrows the cook's mongrel and buys two tons of dog food, which he tries to sell to Connie's old schoolfriend Veronica Schoonmaker and her American millionaire husband Jimmy as a means to making his fortune. Based on the short story "The Go-getter". Guest cast: David Walliams as Rupert Baxter, Tony Maudsley as Cyril Wellbeloved, Natalie Burt as Pandora, Sylvestra Le Touzel as Veronica Schoonmaker, and Nick Hardin as Jimmy Schoonmaker.
3	"Company for Gertrude"	Paul Seed	Guy Andrews	27 January 2013
Clarence hopes to avoid both dancing lessons with Herr Schnellhund and dancing with his niece Gertrude by getting an appropriate young fathead to keep her company. This turns out to be "Beefy" Bingham in disguise. At the same time, worried at how his Aunt Connie will react to the news, Freddie tries to keep secret that he has married the Portuguese exotic dancer Paquita Manganara while in a state of drunkenness. Connie becomes convinced that Paquita is actually a princess and tries to persuade Freddie to marry her, but is Paquita all that she seems? Based on the short story "Company for Gertrude". Guest cast: David Bamber as Herr Schnellhund, Sam Hoare as Rupert "Beefy" Bingham, Eve Hedderwick Turner as Gertrude, and Thaila Zucchi as Paquita.
4	"The Crime Wave at Blandings"	Paul Seed	Guy Andrews	3 February 2013
When Rupert Baxter returns to Blandings as tutor to Clarence's grandson George during the summer holidays, Constance is keen that he should resume his duties as Clarence's secretary permanently. Freddie, owing money to an East End gangster, turns up at Blandings with beguiling dancer Georgia, who takes a fancy to Beach and is determined to make him dance. Clarence threatens that if Baxter goes anywhere near his desk he will shoot him, and when Baxter tidies the desk George shoots Baxter in the backside. Unable to resist the temptation Clarence does the same, leading him to be blackmailed by both Freddie and Baxter himself. When Connie and Beach also use his rear as a target Baxter resigns and departs gingerly on his motorcycle combination. Based on the short story "The Crime Wave at Blandings". Guest cast: David Walliams as Rupert Baxter, Paloma Faith as Georgia Sparks, and Oscar Lloyd as George.
5	"Lord Emsworth and the Girl Friend"	Paul Seed	Guy Andrews	10 February 2013
When the gardener Angus McAllister resigns on the eve of the Blandings Fete and the visit of the children from the London Fresh Air Society, Clarence must do everything he can to get him back, including agreeing to allow his beloved moss path to be gravelled. Among the children are Gladys and her younger brother Ern. The newly reformed Freddie determines to keep on the straight and narrow by helping his father avoid having to give a speech and wear a top hat at the fete, until he is tempted by the children's attractive teacher, Miss Younghusband. When McAllister makes it a condition of his staying that the Empress of Blandings should go and that no more flowers are to be cut in the garden it is a demand too far for Clarence. When Gladys is locked up with The Empress by Constance for throwing a stone at McAllister's shin who is chasing her for picking flowers and stealing sandwiches and a slice of cake for her brother Ern, her stone throwing prowess and love of flowers endear her to Clarence as he comes to her rescue and stands up to McAllister. Based on the short story "Lord Emsworth and the Girl Friend". Guest cast: Richard Doubleday as Gandle, Emily Beecham as Miss Younghusband, Molly Conlin as Gladys, Ashley Foster as Ern, and Olivia Nash as Mrs Rossiter.
6	"Problems with Drink"	Paul Seed	Guy Andrews	17 February 2013
When Wellbeloved leaves Blandings to visit his mother in Tewkesbury his absence causes flatulence in The Empress and anxiety in Clarence. Freddie returns having sworn to give up women for good and devote his life to alcohol, until he meets Amazonian Monica Simmons, the niece of Sir Gregory Parsloe-Parsloe and Wellbeloved's replacement, who arrives at Blandings with the impoverished Dowager Lady Daphne Littlewood and her young son Huxley, the new Marquis. Daphne sets her sights on Clarence, and pretends an interest in pigs in general and in The Empress in particular, making it clear to Connie that after her wedding to Clarence both Connie and Beach will have to leave Blandings. As Clarence prepares to propose he discovers that Daphne is only after his money and that her interest in The Empress is feigned, and she is forced to leave Blandings for good taking the complaining Huxley with her. Guest cast: Jessica Hynes as Daphne Littlewood, Emerald Fennell as Monica Simmons, and Toby Murray as Huxley.

=== Series 2 (2014) ===
No.	Title	Directed by	Written by	Original release date
7	"Throwing Eggs"	Mandie Fletcher	Guy Andrews	16 February 2014
The Duke of Dunstable – the most obnoxious man in Britain – has come to stay at Blandings. Not content with smashing the fixtures, he is determined to have Clarence committed as a lunatic. Guest cast: Harry Enfield as the Duke of Dunstable, Mathew Baynton as Pongo Twistleton, Ruby Bentall as Linda, and Geoffrey McGivern as Sir Roderick Glossop.
8	"Dirty Work at the Crossroads"	Mandie Fletcher	Guy Andrews	23 February 2014
Clarence and Connie's censorious elder sister Charlotte is making everybody's life miserable, and threatening to stay permanently at Blandings. The situation deteriorates when Freddie tries to unite two star-crossed lovers, Clarence's secretary Hugo Carmody and his niece Millicent by stealing the Empress. Guest cast: Celia Imrie as Charlotte, Max Olesker as Hugo Camody, and Ruby Thomas as Millicent.
9	"Hallo to All This"	Geoffrey Sax	Guy Andrews	2 March 2014
Galahad 'Gally' Threepwood, Clarence's incorrigible younger brother, intends to publish a fantastically indiscreet memoir that will disgrace the family. Connie must stop him at all costs. Guest cast: Julian Rhind-Tutt as Galahad Threepwood, Jemima Rooper as Lesley Drabble and Kevin O'Loughlin as Binstead.
10	"Lord Emsworth Acts for the Best"	Geoffrey Sax	Guy Andrews	9 March 2014
The heating at Blandings has failed, and Clarence has grown a preposterous beard. Freddie woos a Hollywood starlet, Pauline Petite, by allowing a movie, headed by Grumman to be made at Blandings, but Connie must not find out. Matters are complicated by religious maniac Drusilla who thinks Beach is a sex maniac. Guest cast: Nichola McAuliffe as Drusilla, Michael Brandon as Grumman, and Zoe Boyle as Pauline Petite.
11	"Sticky Wicket at Blandings"	Mandie Fletcher	Guy Andrews	16 March 2014
Colonel Horace Fanshawe, with his daughter Valerie, calls to sound out Clarence as his successor as Lord Lieutenant of Shropshire, an honour for which Connie is desperate. Beach is behaving peculiarly, and Blandings is more than ever an embarrassing shambles. Freddie is taken with Valerie and she takes Mugsy, the dog he is looking after. Guest cast: James Fleet as Colonel Fanshawe and Sophie Colquhoun as Valerie Fanshawe.
12	"Necessary Rhino"	Geoffrey Sax	Guy Andrews	23 March 2014
Dunstable's even more irascible brother Hannibal, Lord Didcot, is terrorising Clarence to return the money he paid for a dubious painting. Connie decides to get Hannibal married to her new American friend, artist Vanessa Polk. Freddie and Galahad Threepwood scheme to prevent the marriage and make some 'Necessary Rhino' (cash). Guest cast: Julian Rhind-Tutt as Galahad Threepwood, Daisy Beaumont as Vanessa Polk, John Sessions as Hannibal, Lord Didcot, and Ian Beattie as Claude.
13	"Custody of the Pumpkin"	Mandie Fletcher	Guy Andrews	30 March 2014
To get rid of Freddie, Connie plans to marry him off to Sir Gregory Parsloe-Parsloe's unusual niece, Felicity, but Freddie has fallen for Angus McAllister's niece, Niagara to her uncle's displeasure. Clarence wants to win the Fat Pumpkin prize, because if he loses he will also lose the Empress, so he has to defy Connie and scupper the marriage, appease McAllister, and vanquish Parsloe. Beech discovers the answer to Clarence and Connie's problems in a magazine, "Society Spice". Guest cast: Rose Leslie as Niagara Donaldson, Phoebe Waller-Bridge as Felicity Parsloe-Parsloe, and Fergus Craig as Constable Piper.

== Reception ==
Ben Lawrence of The Daily Telegraph awarded the first episode two stars out of five and wrote that the lack of Wodehouse's "authorial voice", ever present in the books to add "clarity and depth" and "invest psychological complexity into [the] characters", left the cast "all at sea".

Tributes were paid to Empress, the Middle White sow used in the show, when she died from what vets believe was a "massive heart attack" just before the final episode was broadcast. Timothy Spall said he was "very upset" at the news.
