= Galahad at Blandings =

1964 novel by P. G. Wodehouse

- First edition (US)
- Author: P. G. Wodehouse
- Original title: The Brinkmanship of Galahad Threepwood
- Language: English
- Publisher: Simon & Schuster (US); Herbert Jenkins (UK)
- Publication date: 31 December 1964 (US); 26 August 1965 (UK)
- Publication place: United States
- Media type: Print (hardback & paperback)
- Preceded by: Service With a Smile
- Followed by: "Sticky Wicket at Blandings" (short story), A Pelican at Blandings (novel)

Galahad at Blandings is a novel by P. G. Wodehouse, first published in the United States on 31 December 1964 by Simon & Schuster, Inc., New York under the title The Brinkmanship of Galahad Threepwood, and in the United Kingdom on 26 August 1965 by Herbert Jenkins, London.

It forms part of the Blandings Castle saga, being the ninth full-length novel to be set there. It also continues the story of Tipton Plimsoll and Veronica Wedge's engagement which was introduced seventeen years earlier in Full Moon, and may be regarded as a sequel to the earlier novel. The text indicating that the stock market crash of October 1929 is still a very recent event, one can infer that the story takes place around the beginning of 1930.

== Plot summary ==
The story opens with the young American millionaire Tipton Plimsoll, and his English friend Wilfred Allsop in a New York police lockup, where the two have been detained for public drunkenness following a wild Greenwich Village party. Wilfred Allsop's uncle Clarence, Earl of Emsworth also happens to be in town for the wedding of his sister Lady Constance, and Wilfred suggests that they call Emsworth for the bail money. They do so, and Tipton, whose wallet was stolen earlier, unwisely tells Emsworth that he has "lost all his money". Emsworth later relays this unintentionally misleading statement to his brother-in-law Colonel Egbert Wedge, who in turn tells his wife Lady Hermione Wedge; their daughter Veronica is engaged to Tipton.

The story now continues in England. Galahad Threepwood is in residence at Blandings Castle, where his sister, Lady Hermione Wedge, has hired Sandy Callender as a secretary for Emsworth, who dislikes having secretaries foisted upon him. Galahad finds himself dealing with Sandy and her now-ex-betrothed Sam Bagshott, who needs £700 to fix up his inherited family seat and sell it.

Sam comes down to Blandings to plead his case with Sandy, but his first accidental encounter with her proves disastrous. Gally brings Sam into the Castle under the name of Augustus Whipple, noted expert on all things porcine and the author of Emsworth's favorite book, On The Care Of The Pig.

Meanwhile, Lady Hermione mistakenly believes that Tipton has lost all his money in the recent stock market collapse and is now impoverished. She rushes up to London to instruct her daughter Veronica to write a letter breaking her engagement, addressed to Tipton at Blandings. Back at Blandings, Tipton arrives in his Rolls Royce automobile and shows Colonel Wedge an £8000 diamond necklace intended for Veronica; at this point it dawns on Colonel Wedge that Emsworth has got everything muddled as usual, and Tipton is still as wealthy as ever. He asks Gally to intercept Veronica's letter, which Gally is pleased to do. On Hermione's return, Gally threatens to deliver the letter to Tipton unless Hermione allows Sam to stay. Sandy confronts Galahad but ends up persuaded by him to take Sam back.

Meanwhile, Emsworth discovers the fatal letter in his desk and has it delivered to Tipton. Gally convinces Tipton that Veronica meant not a word of it, and the two couples head to the registrar's for a double wedding.

Lady Hermione, having discovered that the letter was delivered and nullified, exposes Sam, declares Emsworth to be impossible to manage, and leaves. Gally convinces Emsworth to lend the money to Sam.

== Publication history ==
The first US edition dust jacket was illustrated by John Alcorn. The first UK edition dust jacket was illustrated by "Payne".

The US edition, The Brinkmanship of Galahad Threepwood, is dedicated: "To Scott Meredith, prince of literary agents and best of friends". Scott Meredith was an American literary agent.

== Reception ==
Wodehouse biographer Richard Usborne found that "at this late stage Wodehouse ravels as tangled a plot as ever, but he unravels it with a rather unseemly rush."

== Adaptations ==
In 1992, the story was adapted as a radio drama in four parts in the Blandings radio series.

The sixth episode of the first series of the Blandings television series, "Problems with Drink", was based on Galahad at Blandings and first aired on 17 February 2013.
