= Tit-Bits =

Former British weekly magazine

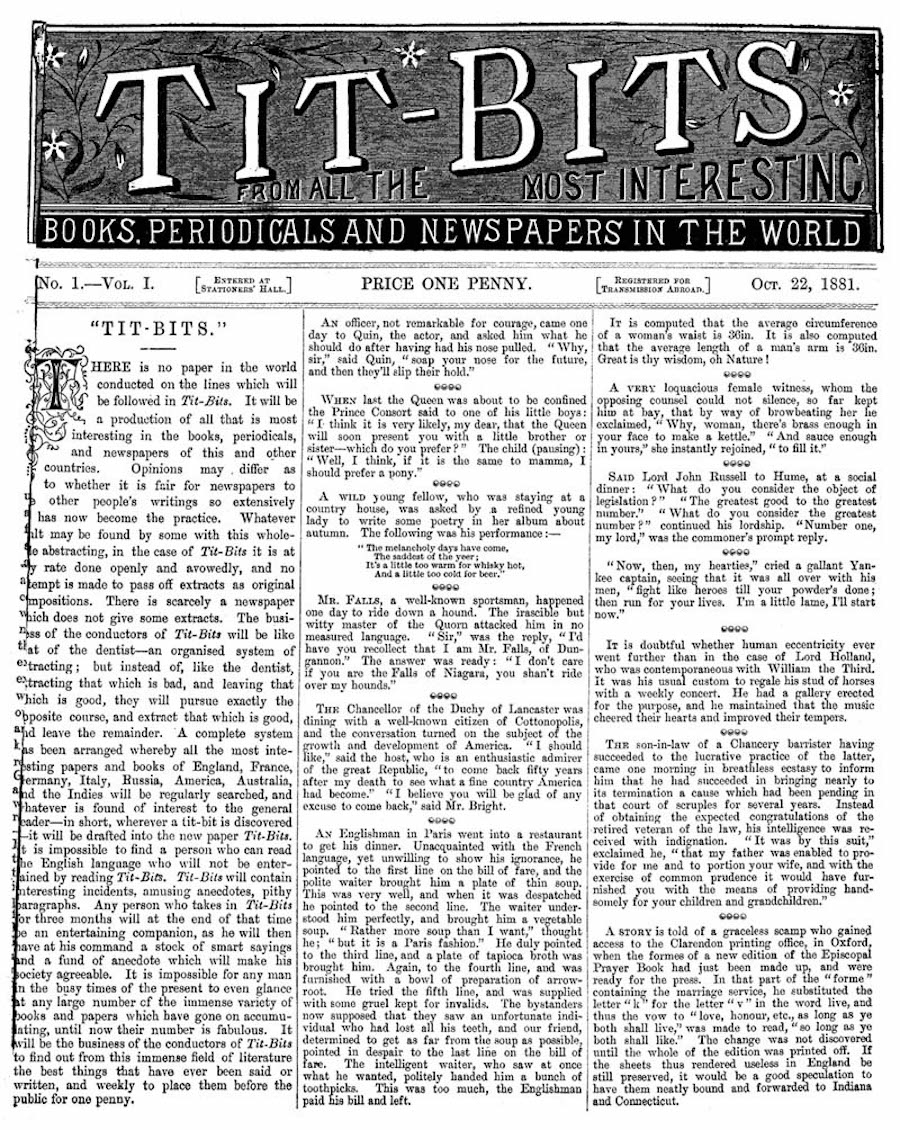
- The first issue of Tit-Bits, dated 22 October 1881
- Frequency: Weekly
- Founder: George Newnes
- Founded: 1881
- First issue: 22 October 1881
- Final issue: 18 July 1984
- Country: United Kingdom
- Based in: London
- Language: English

Tit-Bits from all the interesting Books and Newspapers of the World, more commonly known as Tit-Bits and later as Titbits, was a British weekly magazine founded by George Newnes, a founding figure in popular journalism, on 22 October 1881.

== History ==
In 1886, the magazine's headquarters moved from Manchester to London where it paved the way for popular journalism – most significantly, the Daily Mail was founded by Alfred Harmsworth, a contributor to Tit-Bits, and the Daily Express was launched by Arthur Pearson, who worked at Tit-Bits for five years after winning a competition to get a job on the magazine. The London offices were at 12 Burleigh Street, off the Strand.

From the outset, the magazine was a mass-circulation commercial publication on cheap newsprint which soon reached sales of between 400,000 and 600,000. By the turn of the century, it became the first periodical in Britain to sell over one million copies per issue. Each issue presented a diverse range of tit-bits of information in an easy-to-read format, with the emphasis on human interest stories concentrating on drama and sensation. Later issues featured short stories and full-length fiction, including works by authors such as Rider Haggard and Isaac Asimov, plus three very early stories by Christopher Priest.

Virginia Woolf submitted her first article to the paper in 1890, at the age of eight, but it was turned down. The first humorous article by P. G. Wodehouse, "Men Who Missed Their Own Weddings", appeared in Tit-Bits in November 1900. During the First World War Ivor Novello won a Titbits competition to write a song soldiers could sing at the front: he penned Keep the Home Fires Burning.

Pin-ups appeared on the magazine's covers after the Second World War, and by 1955, circulation peaked at 1,150,000. The name changed from "Tit-Bits" in the issue of 28 December 1967 to "Titbits" in January 1968. In 1979 Reveille (a weekly tabloid with a virtually identical demographic) was merged into Titbits, and the magazine was rebranded as Titbits incorporating Reveille. This, however, was dropped in 1981. Following a wage dispute at owner IPC Magazines, publication ceased on 9 June 1984 and its closure was announced at the end of June. At the time, Titbits was selling 200,000 copies per issue. A final issue was published on 18 July 1984 under its last editor Paul Hopkins. It was taken over by Associated Newspapers' Weekend. At the time, the Financial Times described Titbits as "the 103-year-old progenitor of Britain's popular press". Weekend itself closed in 1989.

The magazine name survived as a glossy adult monthly, Titbits International.

== Imitators ==
The success of Tit-Bits inspired a number of other inexpensive weeklies to ape its format, some short-lived and others, such as Answers becoming major successes in their own right. Within the first six months of its existence, Tit-Bits had inspired twelve imitators, growing to 26 within a year of its debut. Examples of papers said to be imitators include:

- The Ha'porth
- Illustrated Bits
- Rare-Bits
- Scraps
- Sketchy Bits, published in London by Charles Shurey
- Spare Time
- Tid-Bits, published in the United States

== Cultural influence ==
In All Things Considered by G. K. Chesterton, the author contrasts Tit-Bits with The Times, saying: "Let any honest reader... ask himself whether he would really rather be asked in the next two hours to write the front page of The Times, which is full of long leading articles, or the front page of Tit-Bits, which is full of short jokes." Reference to the magazine is also made in James Joyce's Ulysses, George Orwell's Animal Farm, C. P. Snow's The Affair, James Hilton's Lost Horizon, Virginia Woolf's Moments of Being, H. G. Wells' The First Men in the Moon and Kipps, A. J. Cronin's The Stars Look Down and P. G. Wodehouse's Not George Washington. It is also mentioned in Stanley Houghton's play The Dear Departed. Wells also mentioned it in his book Experiment in Autobiography. The magazine is parodied as "Chit Chat" in George Gissing's New Grub Street. In the closing scene of the film Kind Hearts and Coronets (1949), the protagonist Louis Mazzini (Dennis Price) is approached by a journalist (Arthur Lowe) from Tit-Bits.

As a caricature of the contemporary tendency to live through newsprint, Samuel Butler recounts an anecdote in which he asks his servant, Alfred, who had accompanied him on vacation, to come see the view from the Alps, and Alfred replies: "Yes sir, but may I have a little read of Tit-bits first?"

The magazine was mistakenly referenced alongside Playboy and The Sun's Page 3 in Tom Robinson's 1978 song "Glad to Be Gay". Robinson had misinterpreted the magazine's title and assumed its content to be more salacious.
