= Edward Walford =

English magazine editor

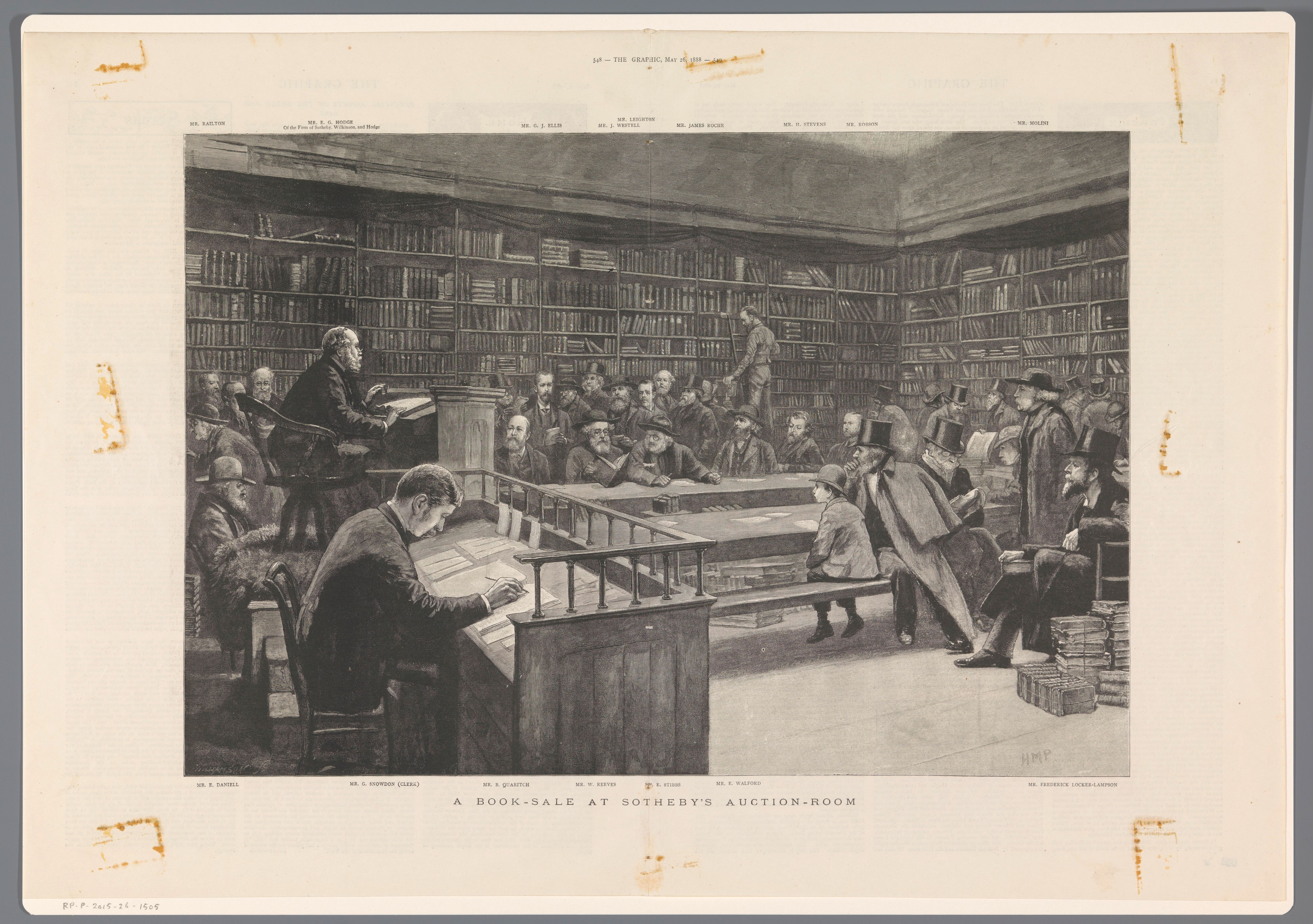
A book sale at Sotheby's auction room. Edward Walford is the man with the top hat seated next to the boy.

Edward Walford (1823–1897) was an English magazine editor and a compiler of educational, biographical, genealogical and touristic works, perhaps best known for the final four volumes of Old and New London (Cassell, London, 1878).

== Life ==
Walford, second son of William Walford of Hatfield Peverel, Essex, matriculated at the University of Oxford on 28 November 1840, aged 17. He was a scholar at Balliol College, Oxford 1841–1847 (B.A. 1845, M.A. 1847), and an ordained clergyman of the Church of England (deacon 1846, priest 1847). He was awarded the Chancellor's Prize for Latin verse in 1843, and the Denyer Theological Prize in 1848 and 1849.

After leaving the university, he was employed as an assistant master of Tonbridge School, but in 1853 converted to Catholicism, and began to earn his living from writing and editorial work. He returned to the Church of England in 1860, but again became a Catholic in 1871.

He died at Ventnor on 20 November 1897, after some years of illness.

== Works ==
In 1855, Walford published an abridged work containing Sozomen's and Philostorgius' Ecclesiastical History, which he translated into English. His genealogical compilations include Walford's County Families (begun 1860) and the Windsor Peerage (1890). He also contributed articles to the Dictionary of National Biography.

Walford was assistant editor of the magazine Once a Week from 1859 until 1865, when he succeeded Samuel Lucas as editor. In 1862, he took over the existing biographical compendium of eminent living persons, Men of the Time, and retitled it Men and Women of the Time. His work on this compendium led to correspondence with many prominent individuals, including Charles Darwin and Wilkie Collins.

He edited The Gentleman's Magazine from 1866 to 1868, and The Antiquary from 1879 to 1880. Soon after The Antiquary began publication he had a well-publicised falling-out with the publisher, Elliot Stock, and in 1882 launched the rival Antiquarian Magazine and Bibliographer (renamed Walford's Antiquarian Magazine and Bibliographical Review 1885). This journal ceased publication in 1886.
