= William Davenport Adams =

Journalist, author and drama critic

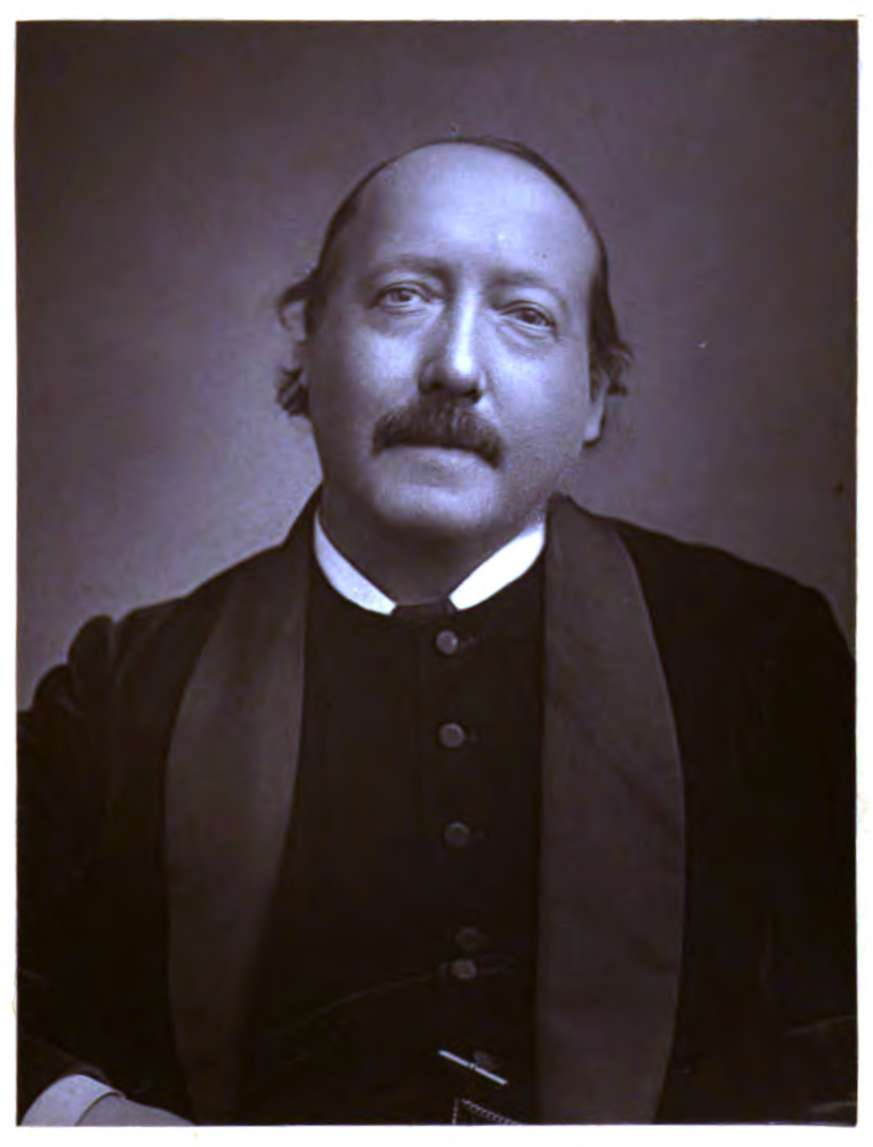
- Photograph of Adams by Alfred Ellis (1854–1930)
- Born: 28 December 1851; Brixton, London, England
- Died: 26 July 1904 (aged 52); Putney, London, England
- Occupations: Author, journalist, and drama critic
- Years active: 1873–1904
- Known for: His knowledge of the drama
- Notable work: A Dictionary of English Literature (1878)

William Davenport Adams (28 December 1851 – 26 July 1904) was an English journalist, drama critic, and author. He was the son of the prolific author William Henry Davenport Adams, and his wife and two sisters also wrote.

== Biography ==
Born in on 28 December 1851 at Park Terrace, New Park Road, Brixton, London. (Note: A register of the scholars admitted into Merchant Taylors’ School gives his date of birth as 25 December 1851. His baptismal record gives his date of birth as 28 December 1852. However, the Oxford Dictionary of National Biography, which cites his birth certificate, gives it as 28 December 1851.) the son of William Henry Davenport Adams, also a journalist and author, and Sarah Esther Morgan (Note: She was later known as Lily Davenport Adams) (13 August 1835 – 1908), the daughter of shoemaker Timothy Morgan. The couple had married at St. Mary's Church in the Parish of Paddington, London on 26 December 1850.

Adams was educated at Merchant Taylors' School in London, The Glasgow Academy, and the University of Edinburgh. However, poor health prevented him from getting a good degree at Edinburgh.

The family were quite involved in literature and drama. Not only did he have the example of his father, who was a prolific author with over 100 books to his credit, but his two sisters, Florence Mary Susan Ballingall (4th quarter 1855 – 4th quarter 1943) and Ellinor Lily Davenport Adams (Note: Her name is sometimes spelled as Elinor Lily Davenport Adams, and was even spelled Eleanor in the 1861 census) (4th quarter 1858 – 11 April 1913) were also writers and gave their occupation as "journalist" and "author" respectively, in the 1901 census and both gave it as journalism and literature" in the 1911 census. Florence seems to have written mainly children's one-act plays, mainly about fairies. (Note: She married Charles Campbell Ballingall (1849–1896), the secretary of Lancashire Insurance Company, in Edinburgh on 31 March 1877, and the 1911 census shows that she bore no children.) Ellinor wrote girls' stories mostly. Most of her later stories were published by Blackie and Son for whom she acted as a publisher's reader. His brother Alfred Elliot (later Davenport) Adams (1st quarter 1861 – 1947) became an actor,, and married an actress.

Adams married Caroline Estelle Körner (c. 1855 – 1st quarter of 1928), the daughter of the late John Körner, a Polish exile from a noble family who had been earning his living as a teacher. The marriage was celebrated at St Mary's Episcopal Church in Glasgow. The 1911 census shows that Caroline had no children. Caroline was also a writer, and wrote a number of compilations as Estelle Davenport Adams. (Note: These included The Poets’ Praise of Poets (1894), Sea-Song and River Rhyme (1887), Flower and Leaf (1884) among others.) However, her health was not good and she was an invalid at the time of his death.

Adams died suddenly at his home, 17 Burstock Road, Putney, on 26 July 1904. (Note: The Times gives his death as happening on the evening of 27 July, as does Who Was Who, the Press Association, and The Mail but the Oxford Dictionary of National Biography and other sources give his date of death as Tuesday 26 July. This date (26th) is convincing not only because the Oxford Dictionary of National Biography cites his death certificate as a source, but also because some of the account of his death on Tuesday evening were published on the morning of Wednesday 27th. The error may spring from The Times which did not give the date, but simply said "yesterday" in its obituary of 28 July.) His death was credited to overwork and worry about the illness of two members of his family. (Note: One of these was his wife, who had "long suffered in health", and was described as an invalid. The second was presumably his 69 year old mother, who died four years later.) The overwork was ascribed to considerable pressure he was under to complete the first volume of A Dictionary of the Drama, which was then in the hands of the binders. He lost consciousness after an illness of a few hours and never recovered.

== Work ==
=== Journalism ===
As a youth he contributed to boys' magazines, and became a journalist at 20 (i.e. in 1871). In 1873 he first began to do reviews of theatrical performances in a serious way. In 1875, the year of his marriage, he was appointed as leader writer and the literary and drama critic for the Glasgow Daily News. He then served as the editor of the Greenock Advertiser form 1878 to 1880. From 1880 to 1882 he was the acting editor of the Nottingham Daily Guardian, (Note: The Oxford Dictionary of National Biography states that he was acting editor of the Nottingham Guardian, but this was a successor title which replaced the Nottingham Daily Guardian in October 1905.) and from 1882 to 1885 he was editor of the Derby Mercury.

Adams moved to London in 1885 where he joined the editorial staff of The Globe. He was the writer of many of the "turnover articles" (Note: Turnover articles are articles which are continued on the following page. In the case of the Globe they appeared in the last column on the first page, and were intended to entice readers to move beyond the front page.) for The Globe. These articles were essays and sketches of social, descriptive, or a humorous kind, and appeared on the first page of the newspaper. These articles were a famous feature of The Globe, demanded a "facile pen" to produce them on such a wide range of topics.

With time, Adams became more and more involved with reviewing, and he serves as the head of the reviewing department at The Globe until his death. (Note: After his death, his sister Ellinor, who had assisted him in his work, took over as the chief reviewer, at least of books.) His wrote a column on Plays and Players not only for The Globe but also for The People.

=== Books ===
Most of Adams books were compilations of the work of others, selected by Adams and with notes and annotations by him. He also wrote a few compilations of his own essays, as well as his two major reference works: A Dictionary of English Literature (1877) and the first volume of a planned two volumes of A Dictionary of the Drama (1904). The first of these was a dictionary with the names of authors, the titles of novels, poems, and plays, famous characters, familiar phrases and first striking words, as well as reference articles on the novel, the sonnet, etc. The Graphic described the work as "a book of reference of a most agreeable, and in many respects a novel class." More than forty years after publication the Westminster Gazette called it "an extremely useful work", although in need of bringing up to date.

Adams was working on the Dictionary of the Drama when he died, and the effort to complete it was cited in at least one obituaries as being a contributory factor to his death, while other referred more generally to overwork and worry about ill family members as being the two contributing factors. Only the first volume (A-G) was published. (Note: As the first volume only covered A-G, it seems likely that three or four volumes would be needed rather than the projected two volumes. The Pall Mall Gazette noted that the first volume only went one quarter way through the alphabet.) The work had been over twenty years in preparation, with the first notice of the work was in November 1881. It was said to have been in preparation by Adams for a considerable time and would be published in 1882. In December 1881, it was announced that the book would soon be published by Chatto and Windus In December 1882, it was stated that the book would be published in a day or two. In April 1885, the book was "nearly finished" and was to be published on an "early day". In November 1893, the book was expected to be published in the spring of 1894. The first volume was eventually published on 8 September 1904. The Bystander noted that Adams had a unique claim to fame in that the book had been advertised at the top of Chatto and Windus's list for a quarter of a century.

When published, the first volume was said to be "astonishing in its variety and completeness." There was some confusion about the second volume as some sources said that the second volume was passing through the press at the time of his death, but other sources make clear that it was the first volume that was in press at the time of his death. Fourteen years after publication, no second volume had been published, and the Westminster Gazette reported that John Parker, the compiler of Who's Who in the Theatre was to complete the dictionary as well as revising the first volume. However, the work seems not to have gone ahead, and no publication record could be found.

The following list of works has been drawn mainly from a search on the Jisc Library Hub Discover website, (Note: The Jisc Library Hub Discover brings together the catalogues of 168 major UK and Irish libraries. Additional libraries are being added all the time, and the catalogue collates national, university, and research libraries.) supplemented by searches for confirmation of details or for any missing details at the British Library, WorldCat, and in the British Newspaper Archive. (Note: A complication in searching for books by Adams in the Library Hub Discover database is that the searches also return books by his father William Henry Davenport Adams, and not all books include this father's full name. However, the British Library distinguishes between books by father and son.)

List of books by Adams
Ser	Type	Year	Title	Publisher	Pages	Notes
1	Compilation	1874	Lyrics of Love, from Shakespeare to Tennyson. Selected and arranged, with notes, by W. D. Adams	Routledge & Sons, London	xix, 422 p., 8º	
2	Compilation	1875	Famous books : sketches in the highways and byeways of English literature	Chatto & Windus, London	xvi, 388 p., 8º	
3	Compilation	1875	The golden book of English song : containing choice selections from the principal poets of the present century	Pickering & Co, London	xviii. 234 p., 8º	
4	Compilation	1875	The Comic Poets of the Nineteenth Century. Poems ... by living writers. Selected and arranged, with notes, by W. D. Adams	Routledge & Sons, London	1, xvi, 400, 1 p., 6 ill., 8º	(Note: Many of the poems were written specially for the compilation.)
5	Own writing	1877	Dictionary of English literature : being a comprehensive guide to English authors and their works	Cassell, Petter & Galpin, London	iv, 708 p, 8º	
6	Compilation	1878	English epigrams, selected and arranged with introduction, notes, and notices of the epigrammatists	Chatto & Windus, London	vii, 272 p., 8º	
7	Compilation	1878	Latter-Day Lyrics, being poems of sentiment and reflection by living writers. Selected and arranged with notes by W. D. Adams. With a note on some foreign forms of verse, by A. Dobson	Edinburgh Publishing Company, Edinburgh	iv, 276 p., 8º	
8	Compilation	1880	Songs of Society, from Anne to Victoria. Edited, with notes and introduction, by W. D. Adams	Ward and Downey, London	xxviii, 156 p., 4º	
9	Compilation	1880	The witty and humorous side of the English poets : with a variety of specimens arranged in periods	Hamilton, Adams Thomas D. Morison, London Glasgow	vi, 276 p., 8º	
10	Compilation	1881	Quips and Quiddities ... [In prose and verse.] Selected and edited by W. D. Adams	Henry and Co, London	vi, 1, 220 p., 3 port., 8º	(Note: Volume 5 of the Whitefriars library of wit and humour.)
11	Compilation	1881	The Treasury of Modern Anecdote, being a selection from the witty and humorous sayings of the last hundred years. Edited, with notes and introduction, by W. D. Adams	Routledge, London	495 p., 8º	
12	Compilation	1885	Songs from the novelists : from Elizabeth to Victoria	London, Hurst & Blackett	xiii, 240 p., 8º	
13	Author of Appendix	1887	Dictionary of phrase and fable : giving the derivation, source, or origin of common phrases, allusions, and words that have a tale to tell. To which is added a concise bibliography of English literature, based upon the larger work ... by W. Davenport Adams.	T.Nelson, London	xxx,512 p., ill., 8º	
14	Own writing	1888	By-ways in book-land : short essays on literary subjects	E. Stock, London	viii, 224 p, 8º	(Note: Included in the book-lovers' library)
15	Own writing	1889	Rambles in book-land : short essays on literary subjects	E. Stock, London	viii, 226 p., 8º	
16	Own writing	1891	With poet and player : essays on literature and the stage	E. Stock, London	viii, 228 p, 8º	
17	Author of introduction	1891	Practical play-writing and the cost of production by C. A. Calmour, with an introduction by William Davenport Adams	G. Routledge & Sons, London	xvi, 400 p., 8º	
18	Compilation	1891	A book of burlesque, sketches of English stage travestie and parody	Henry and Co., London	vi, 220 p., 8º	
19	Own writing	1892	Artistic London	Oetzmann, London	4, 95, 40 p., ill., 12º	(Note: Entitled A Handbook for Visitors on the front cover with 44 pages of advertisements in addition to the text. Illustrated by the noted architectural artists Herbert Railton, Henry William Brewer, Henry Phillip Burke -Downing and others.)
20	Own writing	1904	A Dictionary of the Drama. A guide to the plays, playwrights, players, and playhouses of the United Kingdom and America, from the earliest times to the present. Volume 1. A-G	Chatto & Windus, London	viii, 627 p., 8º	(Note: No second volume was ever produced as Adams died while the first volume was in press.)
21	Editor	1904	The revolutionary epick, and other poems by Benjamin Disraeli... Reprinted from the original edition, and edited by W. Davenport Adams	Hurst and Blackett, London	xiii, 240 p., 8º	
