= The Globe By the Way Book =

First edition

The Globe By the Way Book is, to quote a contemporary source: "a broad smile, more or less, chiefly more, from cover to cover. It ‘whips hypocrisy’ and skits at the follies and fancies and foibles of the day with a light, not to say lightning touch, which tickles a lot but never stings. ‘Buy a bee and grow your own honey. If one bee is not sufficient get two bees, and so on.’ ‘The best way of telling a toadstool from a mushroom is to make the servant eat it. If she turns blue it is a toadstool.’ But to quote more would be giving the book away, whereas it should cost a shilling a copy. Some paper people I know want the earth; others take the Globe; but week-enders cannot afford to be without the ‘By The Way Book’ if they mean to die happily.” (Abridged, The World’s Paper Trade Review, London, July–September 1908)"

The book was written by P. G. Wodehouse and Herbert Westbrook, and was published in June 1908 by the Globe Publishing Company, London. It is not, as many biographies and bibliographies of P. G. Wodehouse erroneously state, a collection of extracts from the By The Way column, a feature of London newspaper The Globe. For more information on this book see http://www.madameulalie.org/articles/Deconstructing_The_Globe_By_the_Way_Book.html

Wodehouse was editor of the By the Way column from 1904 to 1909, and wrote a fictionalised account of his time on the paper, also in collaboration with Westbrook, titled Not George Washington.
