= The Luck Stone =

Novel by P. G. Wodehouse

The Luck Stone is a novel by P. G. Wodehouse, written under the pseudonym Basil Windham. It was compiled from a serial which appeared in Chums: An Illustrated Paper for Boys between 16 September 1908 and 20 January 1909, when Wodehouse was 27 years old.

It was first published as a book long after Wodehouse's 1975 death, on 31 March 1997 by Galahad Books, in a limited run with the ISBN 1-898549-13-3. It has subsequently been published in paperback by Odbody & Marley (2006), ISBN 1-4196-2321-4, and in hardcover by Everyman's Library (2014), ISBN 978-1-84159-195-7.

Like much of Wodehouse's writing of the period, the story is set in a public boys' school. But it departs from that usual form as described by Wodehouse in a letter written to a friend: "I've been commissioned by Chums to do a 70,000-word serial by July. They want it not so public-schooly as my usual stuff and with a rather lurid plot."

It was his only such novel of mystery, high adventure, and danger, given the term "blood and thunder" by Wodehouse scholar Richard Usborne. Usborne observed, "Doubtless Wodehouse enjoyed writing The Luck Stone. …He had shown, in breezy asides throughout his school novels, …that he had read acres of catchpenny fiction, had enjoyed it all and knew all the tricks of it." Though a departure for him, The Luck Stone is thoroughly "Wodehouse," with his trademark sticky situations, quirky characters, sly humor and wit, and renowned prose. Usborne had a high view of this Wodehouse offering: "You're fortunate to have discovered The Luck Stone. Read it."

All published versions of The Luck Stone include the illustrations (numbering around ten) from the original serial in Chums. The illustrations below demonstrate the two seemingly divergent aspects that Wodehouse weaves together in this novel: a truly dark, suspenseful main plot relieved with several humorous situations and subplots.
