= The Globe (London newspaper) =

London evening newspaper, 1803–1921

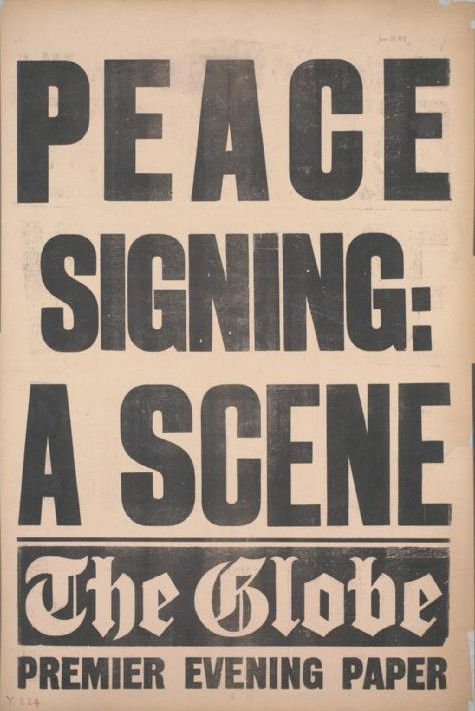
Placard for The Globe announcing the signing of the Treaty of Versailles, 28 June 1919

The Globe was a British newspaper that ran from 1803 to 1921. It was founded by Christopher Blackett, a coal mining entrepreneur from Wylam, Northumberland, who had commissioned the first commercially useful adhesion steam locomotives in the world. It merged with The Pall Mall Gazette in 1921. Under the ownership of Robert Torrens during the 1820s it supported radical politics, and was regarded as closely associated with Jeremy Bentham. By the 1840s it was more mainstream and received briefings from within the Whig administration. In 1871 it was owned by a Tory group headed by George Cubitt, who brought in George Armstrong as editor. It was controlled by Max Aitken shortly before World War I.

Circulation in 1836 was 2,800 and had grown to 3,200 by 1840.

== Turnovers ==
In journalism, turnovers are articles which run beyond the page that they begin on, forcing the reader to turn over. (Note: The Bucks Herald noted in 1889 that you had to use your paper knife to read the second page as the page edges were joined, and not trimmed.) In the case of The Globe, the term has a special meaning. Turnovers for The Globe were essays and sketches, either social, descriptive or humorous, which began at the top of the rightmost column on the first page and carried on to the second page. The typical length of such a turnover article in The Globe was 1,200 words. The turnovers were a noted feature of The Globe.

The first turnover article appeared in January 1877, and was titled "Irish Life" by Richard Barry O'Brien (1847–1918). The Bucks Herald considered that the articles were often good reading. The turnovers were removed from the front page at one stage, but were returned after a change of ownership in 1914. Some readers abandoned the paper after the turnovers were moved from their traditional place on the front page.

Hind stated that many authors began their careers writing turnovers for The Globe, but moved on when their writing could command a higher price than the guinea (21 shillings) that was the standard fee at The Globe. At the time, The Daily News was paying four guineas for articles of interest. Foster stated in 1914 that "every journalist and literary man in London has at some time or other in his early days written Globe turnovers"

Authors of Globe turnover articles included:

- William Davenport Adams (1851–1904) who was on the editorial staff of The Globe.
- George Latimer Apperson (1857–1937), who produced a collection of essays called An Idler's Calendar (George Allen, London, 1901) which was drawn mostly from his Globe turnover articles.
- C. Lewis Hind (1862–1927), who wrote that he did a great deal of writing for The Globe despite the low fee offered because he loved to see his name in print and send cuttings to his mother.
- Neil Munro (1863–1930) was a frequent contributor.
- Frank Bonnett, (born 1873) who wrote on sporting topics and firearms was the author of many turnover articles.

== Staff ==
Staff of the newspaper included William Davenport Adams, Arthur Morrison, Ernest A. Treeton, William Le Queux, and P. G. Wodehouse, who took over from William Beach Thomas as assistant to Harold Begbie on the "By the Way" column and eventually succeeded Begbie in 1904. Wodehouse's career at the newspaper coincided with those of Charles H. Bovill and Herbert Westbrook. Under Aitken (Beaverbrook) the "By the Way" column was moved to the Daily Express, where it was signed 'Beachcomber'.

== See also ==
- Sir Hildebrand Harmsworth, 1st Baronet

== Bibliography ==
- Deering, Dorothy. The London "Globe" of the 1840s and 1850s, Victorian Periodicals Newsletter, No. 11, [Vol. 4, No. 1] (Feb., 1971), pp. 28–29. Published by: The Johns Hopkins University Press on behalf of the Research Society for Victorian Periodicals. Stable URL: https://www.jstor.org/stable/20084876.
