= Walford's County Families =

Walford's County Families is the short title of a work, partly social register, partly "Who's Who", which was produced in Britain in the 19th and 20th centuries, initially under the editorship of Edward Walford. It served as a guide or handbook to the British upper classes and landed gentry (in this case referred to in the title under the term, county families, for which see county family). The title of the annual volumes making up the series varied, and they are sometimes referred to simply as Walford or Walford's. According to the British Library catalogue, they were published from 1860 to 1920.

The work's coverage encompassed many of the most important rich, aristocratic or politically powerful of the people of the period. On the other hand, a sarcastic review in The Spectator in 1868 related that "Mr. Walford ... knows his countrymen, and has compiled a book, which, it is clear, they buy, a directory of all Englishmen distinguished for anything except knowledge, wisdom, or service to mankind." Discussing the "county family" concept, it went on to say that Walford had "included in a vast list of some twelve thousand persons every family living outside a town, and having any sort of claim ... to be considered distinguished."

== Editions ==
Date of publication	Edition number	References
1860	1	
1864	2	
1865	3	
1868	4	
1869	5	
1871	6	
1873	13th Annual Publication	
1875	15th Annual Publication	
1876	16th Annual Publication	
1886	26th Annual Publication	
1889	29th Annual Publication	
1892	32nd Annual Publication	
1908	48th Annual Publication	
1909	49th Annual Publication	
1910		
1919	59th Annual Publication	

== See also ==
- Burke's Landed Gentry
