= Thomas Macall Fallow =

Thomas Macall Fallow (1847–1910), Fellow of the Society of Antiquaries of London, was a Victorian antiquarian and an active member of the Yorkshire Archaeological Society.

After education at Brighton College, he matriculated in 1866 at the University of Cambridge, graduating there B.A. in 1870 and M.A. in 1873. From 1895 to 1899 he was editor of The Antiquary. He was also a contributor to the 11th edition of the Encyclopædia Britannica.

== Publications ==
- Memorials of Old Yorkshire (1892)
- The Cathedral Churches of Ireland (1894)
- Yorkshire Church Plate. Begun by T. M. Fallow. Completed and edited by H. B. McCall (1912)
