= George Latimer Apperson =

British writer

George Latimer Apperson ISO, (1857–1937) was a school inspector and man of letters.

He was editor of The Antiquary from 1899–1915, and a major contributor to the Oxford English Dictionary, both submitting large numbers of quotations and serving as subeditor for parts.

Apperson was created Companion of the Imperial Service Order in 1903, for his service in the Scotch Education Department within the Scottish Office at Whitehall.

== Works ==
The following list has come from a search on the Jisc Library Hub Discover database. (Note: The Jisc Library Hub Discover brings together the catalogues of 168 major UK and Irish libraries. Additional libraries are being added all the time, and the catalogue collates national, university, and research libraries.), with details checked by looking at advertisements and reviews for the works at the time of publication in the British Newspaper Archive.

List of books by Apperson
Ser.	Year	Title	Publisher	Pages	Notes
1	1901	An Idler's Calendar: open air sketches and studies	George Allen, London	254, 1 p., 8º	(Note: Most of the essays and sketches has initially appeared as "turnovers" in The Globe)
2	1903	Bygone London Life: pictures from a vanished past	Elliot Stock, London	x, 151 p., 8º	(Note: A collection of sketches of London life in the years between Elizabeth I and George III. The Newcastle Daily Chronicle called it a "very interesting volume." The book covered: Old-time Restaurants, The Coffee Houses, Some Old London Swells, Old London Museums, Old London Characters. Available on-line at the HathiTrust.)
3	1907	Gleanings after time: chapters in social and domestic history	Elliot Stock, London	213 p., 8º	(Note: Articles reprinted from The Antiquary, which Apperson edited from 1899 to 1915.)
4	1914	The social history of smoking	M. Secker, London	230 p., 8º	(Note: Covers the three hundred years from the introduction of tobacco into England to the time of writing. The Yorkshire Post called it a "most entertaining volume". Available at the HathiTrust.)
5	1929	English proverbs and proverbial phrases : a historical dictionary	Dent, London	721 p., 8º	(Note: Later revised as the Wordsworth Dictionary of Proverbs)
6	1932	A Jane Austen dictionary	C. Palmer, London	xii, 170 p., 8º	(Note: The Yorkshire Post said that the volume was compiled with "remarkable diligence". The author's preface stated his aim in compiling the dictionary was "to include in one alphabet: I .The name of every person, place, book, and author named in Jane Austen's (1) novels; (2) fragments and Juvenilia; II. The titles of all her works, with brief particulars of composition and publication; III. (1) The names of the novelist, her parents, family, and near relations and connections, with brief biographical details; (2) the names of persons associated with her, and of places and localities inhabited or visited by her.")
