= Herbert Westbrook =

British writer (?-1959)

Herbert Wotton Westbrook, also referred to as Herbert Wetton Westbrook (?? – 22 March 1959), was an author best known for having been an early collaborator of P.G. Wodehouse, including becoming his assistant in writing the “By the Way” column for The Globe, before Wodehouse went to live in the United States. Westbrook was also, at least in part, the model for Wodehouse’s character Stanley Featherstonehaugh Ukridge.

Through Westbrook, Wodehouse would also be introduced to the names "Emsworth", "Threepwood" and "Beach", names which would feature in some of his most famous novels. Together, they also co-wrote some musicals and, under the pen name Basil Windham, a serial for Chums, "The Luck Stone".

== Meeting Wodehouse ==
Meeting at Wodehouse's bedsit in London in 1903, Westbrook, a teacher of Latin and Greek at Emsworth House, a prep school in Emsworth, near Portsmouth, would invite Wodehouse to come down and stay with him. The school was run by Baldwin King-Hall, to whom Wodehouse would write the dedication in Indiscretions of Archie, published in 1921. In 1912, Westbrook married Ella, Baldwin King-Hall’s sister, with whom Westbrook and Wodehouse had written an unsuccessful "musical sketch", The Bandit’s Daughter, which only played for a few days at the Bedford Theatre in Camden Town in 1907. Shortly after their marriage, Ella set up a literary agency and became, until her retirement in 1935, Wodehouse’s literary agent for his contracts in the UK.

As well as referring to him as "Brook", Wodehouse would also write a dedication to Westbrook, "that Prince of Slackers", in The Gold Bat (1904). A later dedication to A Gentleman of Leisure (1910), read "To Herbert Westbrook, without whose never-failing advice, help, and encouragement this book would have been finished in half the time".

After staying for some six months on the school grounds, Wodehouse rented a small house nearby called Tresco, before moving into Threepwood Cottage, and Westbrook would soon move in with him, as well as later sharing a flat in London. It was at Threepwood that Wodehouse would first write about Psmith, and where he wrote A Gentleman of Leisure (1910) which, adapted for the stage for two successive productions within a short space of time, would star Douglas Fairbanks Sr. and John Barrymore, respectively. With the proceeds from his sales in the United States, Wodehouse would later buy Threepwood Cottage.

In 1911, Westbrook collaborated with Wodehouse in adapting the latter's short story "Ahead of Schedule" into another musical sketch, After the Show. He also published a few poems and short stories in The Windsor Magazine.

Westbrook died on 22 March 1959.

== Publications ==
=== Short stories ===
- "The Dog-Stroker", The Windsor Magazine (January 1904)
- "The Popularity of Algernon Fitz Clarence", The Windsor Magazine (May 1904)
- "To-morrow", The Windsor Magazine (June 1904)
- "A Cold in the Head", The Windsor Magazine (April 1905)
- "Impromptu", The Windsor Magazine (February 1906)
- "The Brick", The Windsor Magazine (January 1912)
- "And Lived Happily", The Windsor Magazine (March 1912)
- "The Shove", The Windsor Magazine (June 1912)
- "The Circuit", The Bellman (April 5, 1913)

=== Books ===
- The Cause of Catesby, or, Gunpowder, Treason and Plot – Herbert Westbrook (1905)
- Not George Washington – P. G. Wodehouse and Herbert Westbrook (Cassell’s, 1907)
- The Globe By the Way Book – P. G. Wodehouse and Herbert Westbrook (1908)
- Back Numbers – Herbert Wetton Westbrook (1918)
- The Booby Prize, a gesture: and another story – Herbert Wetton Westbrook (1924)

=== Sketches ===
- The Bandit's Daughter – P. G. Wodehouse, Herbert Westbrook (words) and Ella King-Hall (music) (1907)
- After the Show – P. G. Wodehouse and Herbert Westbrook (1911)

=== Play ===
- Brother Alfred – P. G. Wodehouse and Herbert Westbrook (1913)
