= The Antiquary (magazine) =

The Antiquary: A Magazine Devoted to the Study of the Past was a monthly antiquarian magazine published from December 1879 to 1915, in London by Elliot Stock and in New York City by J W Bouton.

Its editors were:

- Edward Walford, 1880
- (G.B. Leathom), 1881–1889
- John Charles Cox, 1890–1895?
- Thomas Macall Fallow, 1895–1899
- George Latimer Apperson, 1899–1915
