= William Henry Davenport Adams =

English writer and journalist

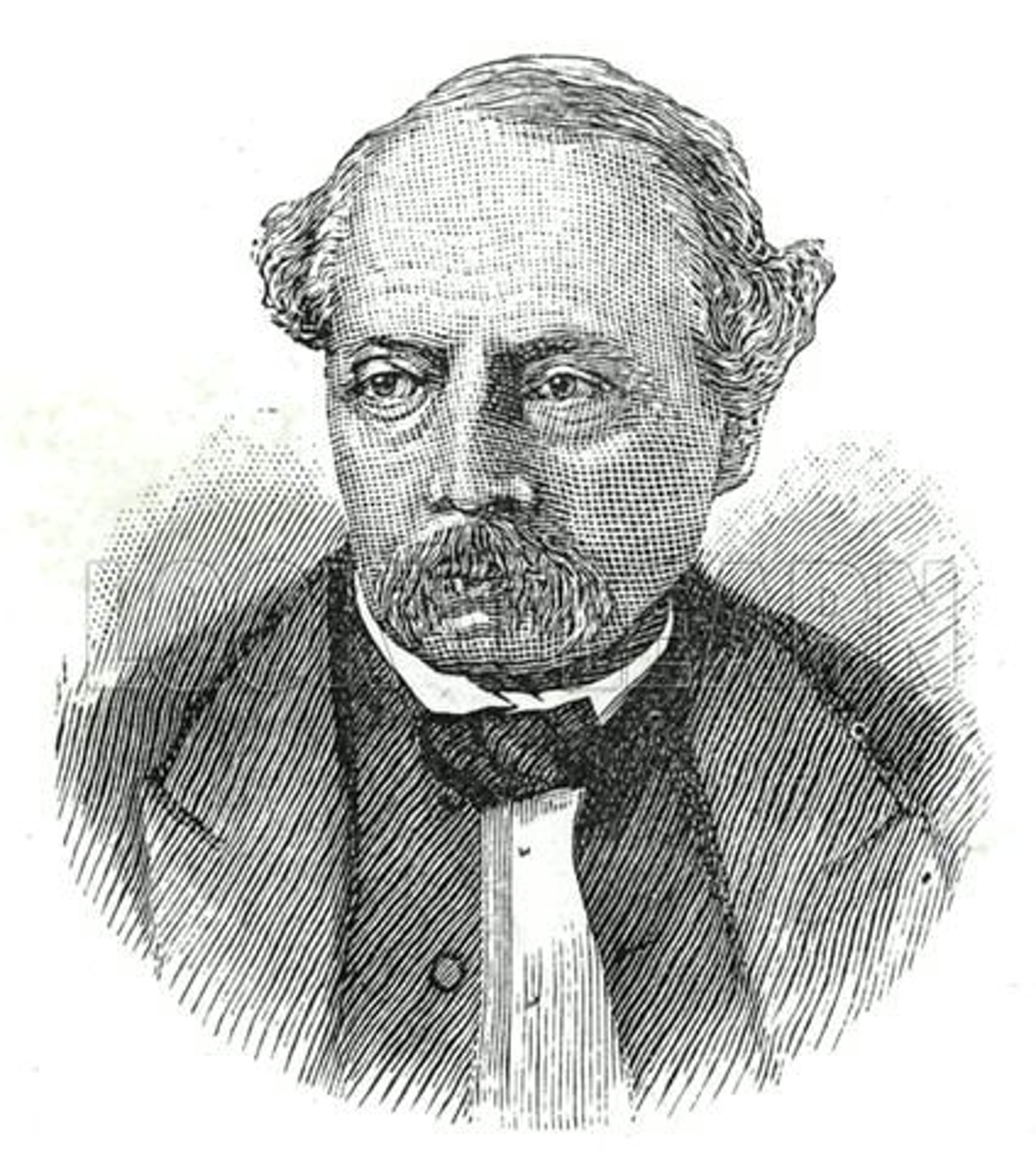
Adams (Illustrated London News, 1892).

William Henry Davenport Adams (1828–1891) was an English writer and journalist of the 19th century, notable for a number of his publications.

== Biography ==
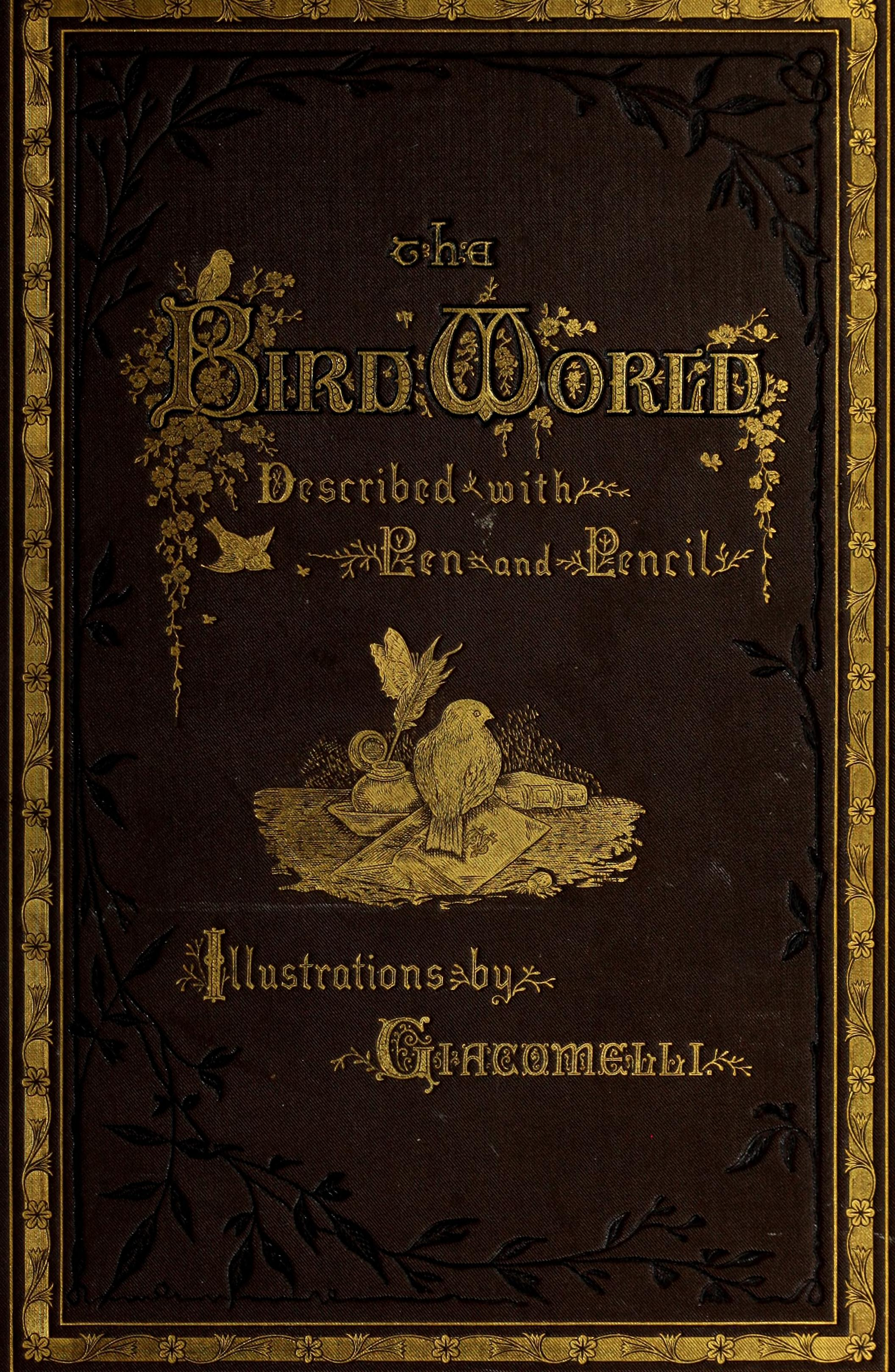
The Bird World: Described with Pen and Pencil (1880)

William Henry Davenport Adams, born in London on 5 May 1828, grandson of Captain Adams, R.N. (died 1806), was the only son of Samuel Adams (born Ashburton, in Devonshire, 1798, died 1853), who married in 1827 Elizabeth Mary Snell. He was christened William Henry, and assumed the additional name of Davenport by the desire of his great-uncle, Major Davenport.

Adams was educated privately, under George Dawson, and became an omnivorous reader. After some experience as a teacher of special subjects in private families, he began a life of unceasing literary toil by editing a provincial newspaper in the Isle of Wight, and while still young established a connection with the London press through such journals as the Literary Gazette, the London Journal and London Society. He made some reputation in turn as a writer of popular science, a writer for boys, a translator, and a lexicographer.

Adams supervised a new edition of Mackenzie's National Cyclopedia, and did a large amount of reading and writing for Messrs. Black (for whom he wrote Guides to Kent and Surrey), for Blackie & Son of Glasgow, and Nelson & Sons, Edinburgh. In 1870, he founded the Scottish Guardian, which he edited down to 1878, and subsequently he projected and edited a series of volumes called The Whitefriars Library of Wit and Humour. He died at Wimbledon on 30 December 1891, and was buried at Kensal Green. He married in 1850 Sarah Esther Morgan, a Welsh lady, by whom he had six children, two of whom died in infancy, leaving two sons and two daughters, all of whom were involved in literature or drama.

Adams' eldest son, W. Davenport Adams, was the author of the Dictionary of English Literature (1878). His eldest daughter Florence Mary Susan Ballingall (birth registered in 4th quarter 1855 – death registered in 4th quarter 1943) wrote children's one-act plays, mainly about fairies. (Note: She married Charles Campbell Ballingall (1849–1896), the secretary of Lancashire Insurance Company, in Edinburgh on 31 March 1877, and the 1911 census shows that she bore no children.) His youngest daughter Ellinor Lily Davenport Adams (Note: Her first name is sometimes spelled as Elinor or Eleanor)(birth registered in the 4th quarter 1858 – 11 April 1913) wrote girls' stories mostly. (Note: Most of her later stories were published by Blackie and Son for whom she acted as a publisher's reader.) His youngest son Alfred Elliot (later Davenport) Adams (birth registered in 1st quarter 1861 – 1947) became an actor,, and married an actress.

Adams' voluminous compilations, numbering nearly 140 in all, include a number of useful translations from the French of L. Figuier, J. C. F. Hoefer, A. Mangin, Jules Michelet, and B. H. Révoil. According to the Dictionary of National Biography, his best work is contained in the following:

1. History, Topography, and Antiquities of the Isle of Wight, 1856 and 1884.
2. Memorable Battles in English History, 1862, 1868, and 1878.
3. Famous Regiments, 1864.
4. Dwellers on The Threshold: Or, Magic and Magicians (1865)
5. Wonders of the Vegetable World, 1867.
6. Famous Ships of the British Navy, 1868.
7. Lighthouses and Lightships, 1870, 1876, 1879, 1891.
8. The Arctic World: its Plants, Animals, and Natural Phenomena, 1876.
9. The Bird World, 1877.
10. English Party Leaders, 2 vols. 1878.
11. The Merry Monarch, 1885.
12. England on the Sea, 2 vols. 1885.
13. England at War, 2 vols. 1886.
14. Good Queen Anne, 1886.
15. A Concordance to the Plays of Shakespeare, 1886.
16. Witch, Warlock, and Magician, 1889.
17. Battle Stories, 1889.

Adams edited a single-volume annotated edition of Shakespeare's Plays. In addition, he wrote Woman's Work and Worth in Girlhood, Maidenhood, and Wifehood: Illustrations of Woman's Character, Duties, Rights, Position, Influence, Responsibilities, and Opportunities (London: J. Hogg, 1880; Chicago: Rand McNally, 1884).
