= Nottingham Guardian =

Newspaper

The Nottingham Guardian was a newspaper in Nottingham, Nottinghamshire, England that ran from 10 October 1905 to 5 September 1953. It was a continuation of the Nottingham Daily Guardian which had run from 1861 to 1905. In 1953 it merged with the Nottingham Journal to form the Nottingham Guardian Journal.
