= Elliot Stock =

English publisher (1838–1911)

Elliot Stock (1838 – 1 March 1911) was an English publisher and bibliophile who collected first editions. The publishing company that bore his name was in business from 1859 to 1939.

== Early life and career ==
His father was wealthy but died when Elliot was in his infancy. After education at Amersham Grammar School, Elliot Stock first worked for the firm of Piper, Stephenson, and Spence and then in 1857 became an apprentice to Mr. B. L. Green, a book-seller at 62, Paternoster Row.

== Publisher ==
In 1859 Stock acquired the business. B. L. Green was the brother of Dr. Green of the Religious Tract Society. In its early years, the firm of Elliot Stock was primarily engaged in publishing religious works.

In 1877 Stock published facsimile first editions of The Pilgrim's Progress, The Compleat Angler and George Herbert's The Temple. Every effort was made to recreate the actual type, paper, and binding of the original works in these facsimiles. Stock's firm published many other notable facsimile first editions, such as those for Robinson Crusoe, Rasselas and The Vicar of Wakefield. The Antiquary was published by the Elliot Stock company from December 1879 to 1915. The monthly Book-Prices Current was started in 1887 by the firm of Elliot Stock and became a standard reference for book dealers and collectors. Beginning in 1886 Stock published a book series titled The Book-Lover's Library under the editorship of Henry B Wheatley.

== Personal life ==
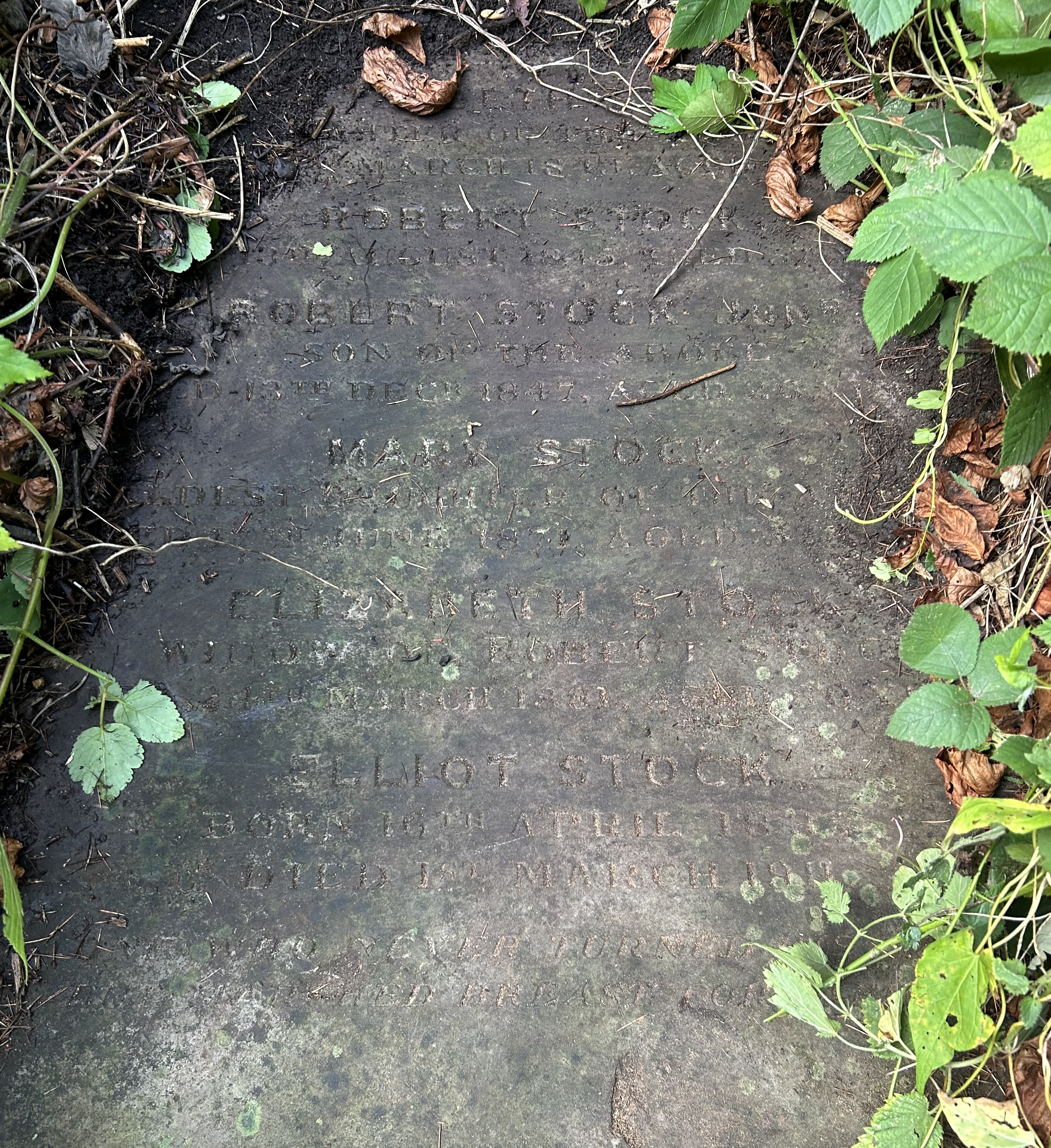
Grave of Elliot Stock in Highgate Cemetery

In 1866 Stock married Fanny Bellin, the daughter of Samuel Bellin, an artist and engraver. Stock became an amateur painter and poet and acquired many artistic and literary friends and acquaintances. He was also a bird-watcher and athlete (winning a silver cup in rowing).

Elliot Stock and Fanny R. Bellin were the parents of four sons and a daughter. Their son Ernest Elliot Stock (1869–1957) was the author of The Ring of Ug, and Other Weird Tales and publications on climbing in the Alps.

Stock died on 1st March 1911 and was buried in the dissenters section of the west side of Highgate Cemetery.
