= Not George Washington =

1907 novel by P. G. Wodehouse

- First edition
- Author: P. G. Wodehouse
- Language: English
- Genre: Autobiographical novel
- Publisher: Cassell and Co.
- Publication date: 18 October 1907
- Publication place: United Kingdom
- Media type: Print (hardcover)

Not George Washington is a semi-autobiographical novel by P. G. Wodehouse, written in collaboration with Herbert Westbrook. The United Kingdom is the country of first publication on 18 October 1907 by Cassell and Co., London.

Much of the book is a lightly fictionalised account of Wodehouse's early career as a writer and journalist in London. For example, from 1904 to 1909 Wodehouse edited the "By the Way" column for the now-defunct The Globe newspaper, while the book's main character, James Orlebar Cloyster, writes the "On Your Way" column for the Orb newspaper.

The tale is told from several viewpoints.
