= P. G. Wodehouse =

English writer (1881–1975)

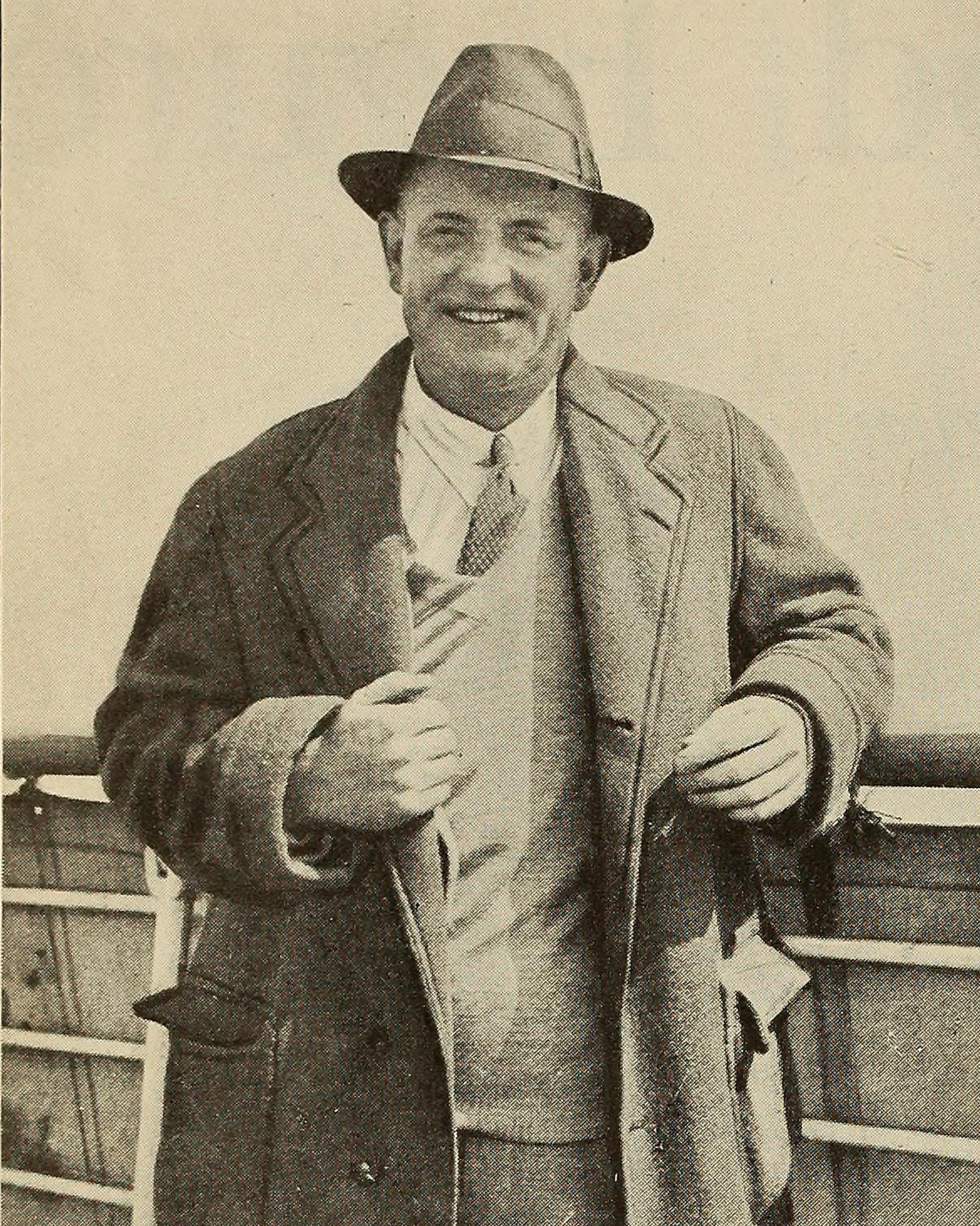
Wodehouse in 1930

Sir Pelham Grenville Wodehouse (/ˈwʊdhaʊs/ WUUD-howss; 15 October 1881 – 14 February 1975) was an English writer and one of the most widely read humorists of the 20th century. His creations include the feather-brained Bertie Wooster and his sagacious valet, Jeeves; the immaculate and loquacious Psmith; Lord Emsworth and the Blandings Castle set; the Oldest Member, with stories about golf; and Mr. Mulliner, with tall tales on subjects ranging from bibulous bishops to megalomaniac movie moguls.

Born in Guildford, the third son of a British magistrate based in Hong Kong, Wodehouse spent happy teenage years at Dulwich College, to which he remained devoted all his life. After leaving school he was employed by a bank but disliked the work and turned to writing in his spare time. His early novels were mostly school stories, but he later switched to comic fiction. Most of Wodehouse's fiction is set in his native United Kingdom, although he spent much of his life in the US and used New York and Hollywood as settings for some of his novels and short stories. He wrote a series of Broadway musical comedies during and after the First World War, together with Guy Bolton and Jerome Kern, that played an important part in the development of the American musical. He began the 1930s writing for MGM in Hollywood. In a 1931 interview, his naive revelations of incompetence and extravagance in the studios caused a furore. In the same decade, his literary career reached a new peak.

In 1934 Wodehouse moved to France for tax reasons; in 1940 he was taken prisoner at Le Touquet by the invading Germans and interned for nearly a year. After his release he made five broadcasts from German radio in Berlin to the US, which had not yet entered the war. The talks were comic and apolitical, but his broadcasting over enemy radio prompted anger and strident controversy in Britain, and a threat of prosecution. Wodehouse never returned to England. From 1947 until his death he lived in the US; he took US citizenship in 1955 while retaining his British one. He died in 1975, at the age of 93, in Southampton, New York, one month after he was awarded a knighthood of the Order of the British Empire (KBE).

Wodehouse was a prolific writer throughout his life, publishing more than ninety books, forty plays, two hundred short stories and other writings between 1902 and 1974. He worked extensively on his books, sometimes having two or more in preparation simultaneously. He would take up to two years to build a plot and write a scenario of about thirty thousand words. After the scenario was complete he would write the story. Early in his career Wodehouse would produce a novel in about three months, but he slowed in old age to around six months. He used a mixture of Edwardian slang, quotations from and allusions to numerous poets, and several literary techniques to produce a prose style that has been compared to comic poetry and musical comedy. Some critics of Wodehouse have considered his work flippant, but among his fans are former British prime ministers and many of his fellow writers.

== Life and career ==
=== Early years ===
Wodehouse was born in Guildford, Surrey, the third son of Henry Ernest Wodehouse, a magistrate resident in the British colony of Hong Kong, and his wife, Eleanor, daughter of John Bathurst Deane. The Wodehouses belonged to a cadet branch of the family of the Earls of Kimberley. Eleanor Wodehouse was also of ancient aristocratic ancestry. She was visiting her sister in Guildford when Wodehouse was born there prematurely.

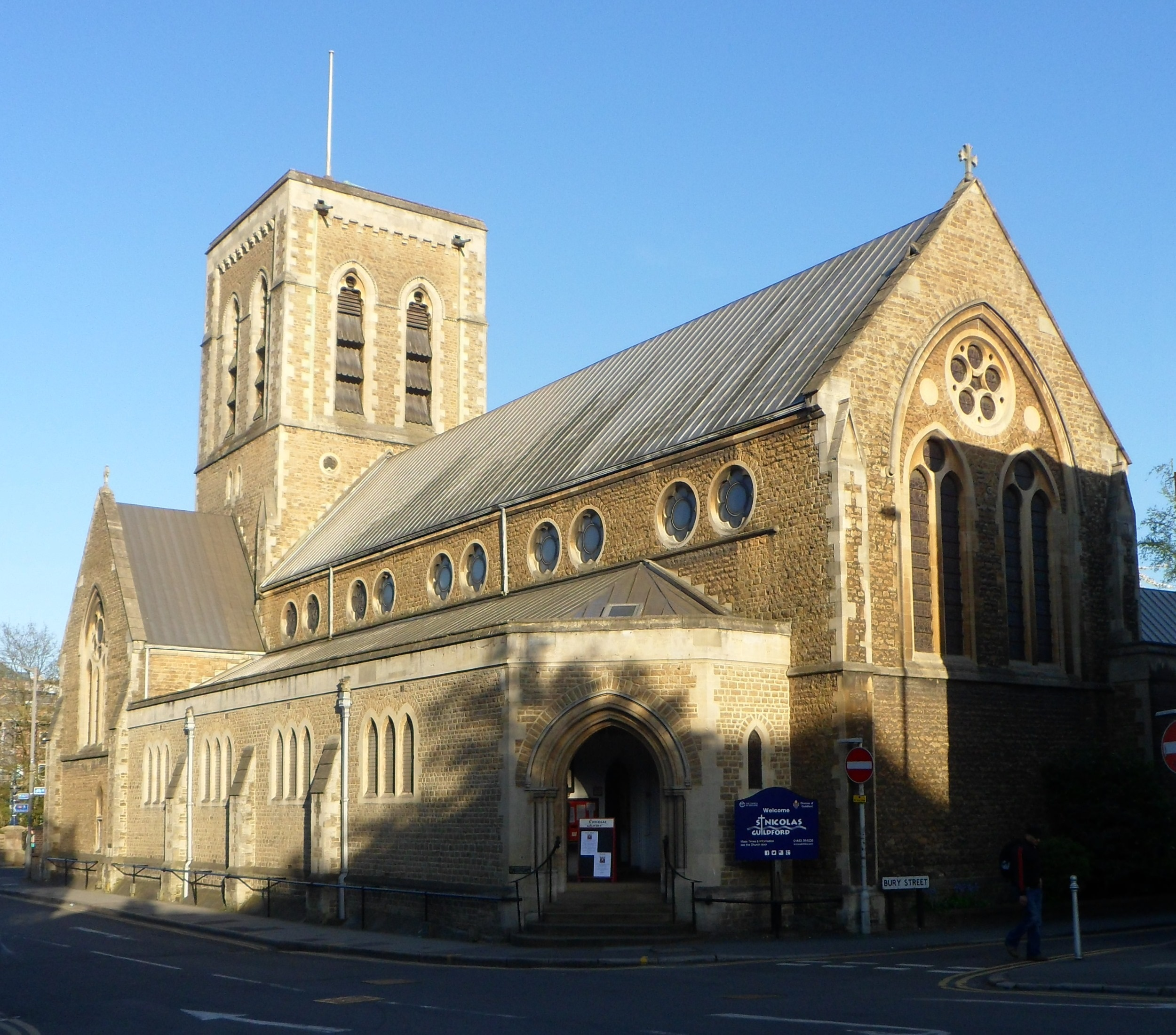
St Nicolas Church, Guildford, where Wodehouse was christened

The boy was baptised at the Church of St Nicolas, Guildford, and was named after his godfather, Pelham von Donop. Wodehouse wrote in 1957, "If you ask me to tell you frankly if I like the name Pelham Grenville Wodehouse, I must confess that I do not. ... I was named after a godfather, and not a thing to show for it but a small silver mug which I lost in 1897." (Note: P. G. von Donop's middle name was George. It is unclear why Grenville was chosen for Wodehouse. The academic Sophie Ratcliffe speculates that Eleanor Wodehouse chose it because of her liking for literary heroes. Sir Richard Grenville is the hero of Tennyson's The Revenge; among the names Eleanor gave her other sons were Peveril from Scott's Peveril of the Peak and Lancelot from Tennyson's Idylls of the King.) The first name was rapidly elided to "Plum", the name by which Wodehouse became known to family and friends.

Mother and son sailed for Hong Kong, where for his first two years Wodehouse was raised by a Chinese amah (nurse), alongside his elder brothers Philip Peveril John (1877–1951) and Ernest Armine (1879–1936). (Note: A younger brother, Richard, was born in 1892. He "hardly featured in Wodehouse's life", according to the biographer Robert McCrum, living for most of his life in India and then China, and making a modest reputation as an amateur cricketer.) When he was two, the brothers were brought to England, where they were placed under the care of an English nanny in a house adjoining that of Eleanor's father and mother.

The boys' parents returned to Hong Kong and became virtual strangers to their sons. Such an arrangement was then normal for middle-class families based in the colonies. The lack of parental contact, and the harsh regime of some of those in loco parentis, left permanent emotional scars on many children from similar backgrounds, including the writers Thackeray, Saki, Kipling and Walpole. Wodehouse was more fortunate; his nanny, Emma Roper, was strict but not unkind, and both with her and later at his different schools Wodehouse had a generally happy childhood. His recollection was that "it went like a breeze from start to finish, with everybody I met understanding me perfectly". The biographer Robert McCrum suggests that nonetheless Wodehouse's isolation from his parents left a psychological mark, causing him to avoid emotional engagement both in life and in his works. Another biographer, Frances Donaldson, writes, "Deprived so early, not merely of maternal love, but of home life and even a stable background, Wodehouse consoled himself from the youngest age in an imaginary world of his own."

In 1886 the brothers were sent to a dame-school in Croydon, where they spent three years. Peveril was then found to have a "weak chest"; sea air was prescribed, and the three boys were moved to Elizabeth College on the island of Guernsey. In 1891 Wodehouse went on to Malvern House Preparatory School in Kent, which concentrated on preparing its pupils for entry to the Royal Navy. His father had planned a naval career for him, but the boy's eyesight was found to be too poor for it. He was unimpressed by the school's narrow curriculum and zealous discipline; he later parodied it in his novels, with Bertie Wooster recalling his early years as a pupil at a "penitentiary ... with the outward guise of a prep school" called Malvern House.

Cheney Court, Ditteridge, a large 17th-century house near Box in Wiltshire, was one of Wodehouse's homes while his parents were living in Hong Kong. His grandmother died in 1892, after which he was largely brought up by his aunts, including the writer Mary Bathurst Deane, the original of Bertie Wooster's fictional Aunt Agatha. In 1955 Wodehouse wrote "Aunt Agatha is definitely my Aunt Mary, who was the scourge of my childhood."

Throughout their school years the brothers were sent to stay during the holidays with various uncles and aunts from both sides of the family. In the Oxford Dictionary of National Biography, Iain Sproat counts twenty aunts and considers that they played an important part not only in Wodehouse's early life, but, thinly disguised, in his mature novels, as the formidable aunts who dominate the action in the Wooster, Blandings, and other stories. The boys had fifteen uncles, four of whom were clergymen. Sproat writes that they inspired Wodehouse's "pious but fallible curates, vicars, and bishops, of which he wrote with friendly irreverence but without mockery".

He has the most distorted ideas about wit and humour; he draws over his books and examination papers in the most distressing way and writes foolish rhymes in other people's books. Notwithstanding he has a genuine interest in literature and can often talk with enthusiasm and good sense about it.

— Dulwich College report on Wodehouse, 1899.

At the age of twelve in 1894, to his great joy, Wodehouse was able to follow his brother Armine to Dulwich College. He was entirely at home there; Donaldson comments that Dulwich gave him, for the first time, "some continuity and a stable and ordered life". He loved the camaraderie, distinguished himself at cricket, rugby and boxing, and was a good, if not consistently diligent, student. The headmaster at the time was A. H. Gilkes, a respected classicist, who was a strong influence on Wodehouse. In a study of Wodehouse's works, Richard Usborne argues that "only a writer who was himself a scholar and had had his face ground into Latin and Greek (especially Thucydides) as a boy" could sustain the complex sequences of subordinate clauses sometimes found in Wodehouse's comic prose. (Note: Usborne cites as an example a sentence from Money in the Bank (1942): "With the feeling, which was his constant companion nowadays, for the wedding was fixed for the fifth of July and it was already the tenth of June, that if anybody cared to describe him as some wild thing taken in a trap, which sees the trapper coming through the woods, it would be all right with him, he threw a moody banana skin at the loudest of the sparrows, and went back into the room.")

Wodehouse's six years at Dulwich were among the happiest of his life: "To me the years between 1894 and 1900 were like heaven." In addition to his sporting achievements he was a good singer and enjoyed taking part in school concerts; his literary leanings found an outlet in editing the school magazine, The Alleynian. For the rest of his life he remained devoted to the school. The biographer Barry Phelps writes that Wodehouse "loved the college as much as he loved anything or anybody".

=== Reluctant banker; budding writer: 1900–1908 ===
Cover of Wodehouse's first published novel, 1902

Wodehouse expected to follow Armine to the University of Oxford, but the family's finances took a turn for the worse at the crucial moment. Ernest Wodehouse had retired in 1895, and his pension was paid in rupees; fluctuation against the pound reduced its value in Britain. Wodehouse recalled, "The wolf was not actually whining at the door and there was always a little something in the kitty for the butcher and the grocer, but the finances would not run to anything in the nature of a splash". (Note: McCrum finds Ernest Wodehouse's decision inconsistent with the financial facts: he calculates that Ernest's income, currency fluctuations notwithstanding, would comfortably have allowed him to send two sons to Oxford. Wodehouse later reflected that had he gone to Oxford he probably would have become a teacher like his brother Armine, and not made a career as a writer.) Instead of a university career, in September 1900 Wodehouse was engaged in a junior position in the London office of the Hongkong and Shanghai Bank. He was unsuited to it and found the work baffling and uncongenial. He later wrote a humorous account of his experiences at the bank, but at the time he longed for the end of each working day, when he could return to his rented lodgings in Chelsea and write. At first he concentrated, with some success, on serious articles about school sports for Public School Magazine. In November 1900 his first comic piece, "Men Who Missed Their Own Weddings", was accepted by Tit-Bits. A new magazine for boys, The Captain, provided further well-paid opportunities, and during his two years at the bank, Wodehouse had eighty pieces published in a total of nine magazines.

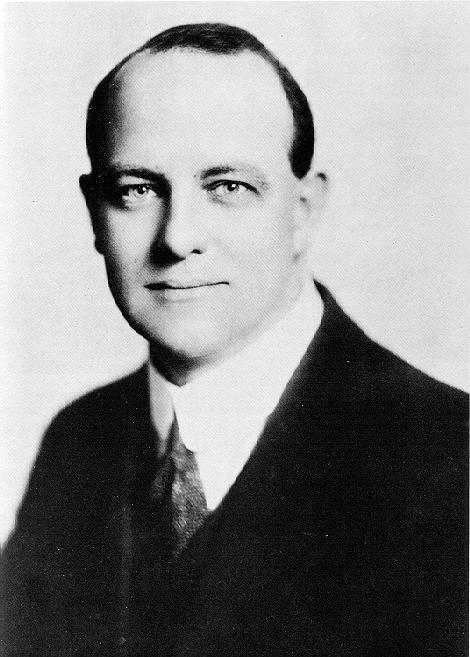
Wodehouse in 1904, aged 23

In 1901, with the help of a former Dulwich master, William Beach Thomas, Wodehouse secured an appointment—at first temporary and later permanent—writing for The Globe's popular "By the Way" column. He held the post until 1909. At around the same time his first novel was published – a school story called The Pothunters, serialised incomplete in Public School Magazine in early 1902, and issued in full in hardback in September. He resigned from the bank that month to devote himself to writing full-time. (Note: Wodehouse primarily wrote under the name P. G. Wodehouse, but occasionally used other names, including P. Brooke-Haven, Melrose Grainger, Pelham Grenville, J. Plum, J. Walker Williams, C.P. West, Henry William-Jones and Basil Windham.)

Between the publication of The Pothunters 1902 and that of Mike in 1909, Wodehouse wrote eight novels and co-wrote another two. The critic R. D. B. French writes that, of Wodehouse's work from this period, almost all that deserves to survive is the school fiction. Looking back in the 1950s Wodehouse viewed these as his apprentice years: "I was practically in swaddling clothes and it is extremely creditable to me that I was able to write at all."

From his boyhood Wodehouse had been fascinated by America, which he conceived of as "a land of romance"; he "yearned" to visit the country, and by 1904 he had earned enough to do so. In April he sailed to New York, which he found greatly to his liking. He noted in his diary: "In New York gathering experience. Worth many guineas in the future but none for the moment." This prediction proved correct: few British writers had first-hand experience of the US, and his articles about life in New York brought him higher than usual fees. He later recalled that "in 1904 anyone in the London writing world who had been to America was regarded with awe and looked upon as an authority on that terra incognita. ... After that trip to New York I was a man who counted. ... My income rose like a rocketing pheasant."

There are pleasant little spots my heart is fixed on,
Down at Parkhurst or at Portland on the sea,
And some put up at Holloway and Brixton,
But Pentonville is good enough for me.

— From Wodehouse's first lyric for a stage show, 1904.

Wodehouse's other new venture in 1904 was writing for the stage. Towards the end of the year the librettist Owen Hall invited him to contribute an additional lyric for a musical comedy, Sergeant Brue. (Note: The piece had been running at the Strand Theatre since June; it was common practice for musical comedies to be refreshed with new material during their runs.) Wodehouse had loved theatre since his first visit, aged thirteen, when Gilbert and Sullivan's Patience had made him "drunk with ecstasy". His lyric for Hall, "Put Me in My Little Cell", was a Gilbertian number for a trio of comic crooks, with music by Frederick Rosse; it was well received and launched Wodehouse on a career as a theatre writer that spanned three decades.

Although it made little impact on its first publication, the 1906 novel Love Among the Chickens contained what French calls the author's first original comic creation: Stanley Featherstonehaugh Ukridge. The character, an amoral, bungling opportunist, is partly based on Wodehouse's Globe colleague Herbert Westbrook. The two collaborated between 1907 and 1913 on two books, two music hall sketches, and a play, Brother Alfred. (Note: The two books were Not George Washington (1907) and The Globe By the Way Book (1908).) Wodehouse would return to the character in short stories over the next six decades.

In early 1906 the actor-manager Seymour Hicks invited Wodehouse to become resident lyricist at the Aldwych Theatre, to add topical verses to newly imported or long-running shows. Hicks had already recruited the young Jerome Kern to write the music for such songs. The first Kern-Wodehouse collaboration, a comic number for The Beauty of Bath titled "Mr [Joseph] Chamberlain", was a show-stopper and was briefly the most popular song in London.

=== Psmith, Blandings, Wooster and Jeeves: 1908–1915 ===
Psmith, drawn by T. M. R. Whitwell for first edition of Mike (1909)

Wodehouse's early period as a writer came to an end in 1908 with the serialisation of The Lost Lambs, published the following year in book form as the second half of the novel Mike. The work begins as a conventional school story, but Wodehouse introduces a new and strikingly original character, Psmith, whose creation both Evelyn Waugh and George Orwell regarded as a watershed in Wodehouse's development. Wodehouse said that he based Psmith on the hotelier and impresario Rupert D'Oyly Carte—"the only thing in my literary career which was handed to me on a silver plate with watercress around it". Wodehouse wrote in the 1970s that a cousin of his who had been at school with Carte told him of the latter's monocle, studied suavity, and stateliness of speech, all of which Wodehouse adopted for his new character. (Note: In the opinion of Carte's daughter, Dame Bridget D'Oyly Carte, the schoolboy described to Wodehouse was not her father, who was shy and taciturn, but his more outgoing elder brother Lucas.) Psmith featured in three more novels: Psmith in the City (1910), a burlesque of banking; Psmith, Journalist (1915) set in New York; and Leave It to Psmith (1923), set at Blandings Castle.

In May 1909 Wodehouse made his second visit to New York, where he sold two short stories to Cosmopolitan and Collier's for a total of $500, a much higher fee than he had commanded previously. He resigned from The Globe and stayed in New York for nearly a year. He sold many more stories, but none of the American publications offered a permanent relationship and guaranteed income. Wodehouse returned to England in late 1910, rejoining The Globe and also contributing regularly to The Strand Magazine. Between then and the outbreak of the First World War in 1914 he revisited America frequently.

Wodehouse was in New York when the war began. Ineligible for military service because of his poor eyesight, he remained in the US throughout the war, detached from the conflict in Europe and absorbed in his theatrical and literary concerns. In September 1914 he married Ethel May Wayman, née Newton (1885–1984), an English widow. The marriage proved happy and lifelong. Ethel's personality was in contrast with her husband's: he was shy and impractical; she was gregarious, decisive and well organised. In Sproat's phrase, she "took charge of Wodehouse's life and made certain that he had the peace and quiet he needed to write". There were no children of the marriage, but Wodehouse came to love Ethel's daughter Leonora (1905–1944) and legally adopted her. (Note: Leonora took Wodehouse's surname until she married Peter Cazalet in 1932.)

My Man Jeeves, 1920 edition

Wodehouse experimented with different genres of fiction in these years; Psmith, Journalist, mixing comedy with social comment on slum landlords and racketeers, was published in 1915. In the same year The Saturday Evening Post paid $3,500 to serialise Something New, the first of what became a series of novels set at Blandings Castle. It was published in hardback in the US and the UK in the same year (the British edition being retitled Something Fresh). It was Wodehouse's first farcical novel; it was also his first best-seller, and although his later books included some gentler, lightly sentimental stories, it was as a farceur that he became known. Later in the same year "Extricating Young Gussie", the first story about Bertie and Jeeves, was published. (Note: In this story Bertie's surname is evidently not Wooster but Mannering-Phipps, and Jeeves is not yet the omniscient deus ex machina he was soon to become in subsequent stories.) These stories introduced two sets of characters about whom Wodehouse wrote for the rest of his life. The Blandings Castle stories, set in an English stately home, depict the attempts of the placid Lord Emsworth to evade the many distractions around him, which include successive pairs of young lovers, the machinations of his exuberant brother Galahad, the demands of his domineering sisters and super-efficient secretaries, and anything detrimental to his prize sow, the Empress of Blandings. The Bertie and Jeeves stories feature an amiable young man-about-town, regularly rescued from the consequences of his idiocy by the benign interference of his valet.

=== Broadway: 1915–1919 ===
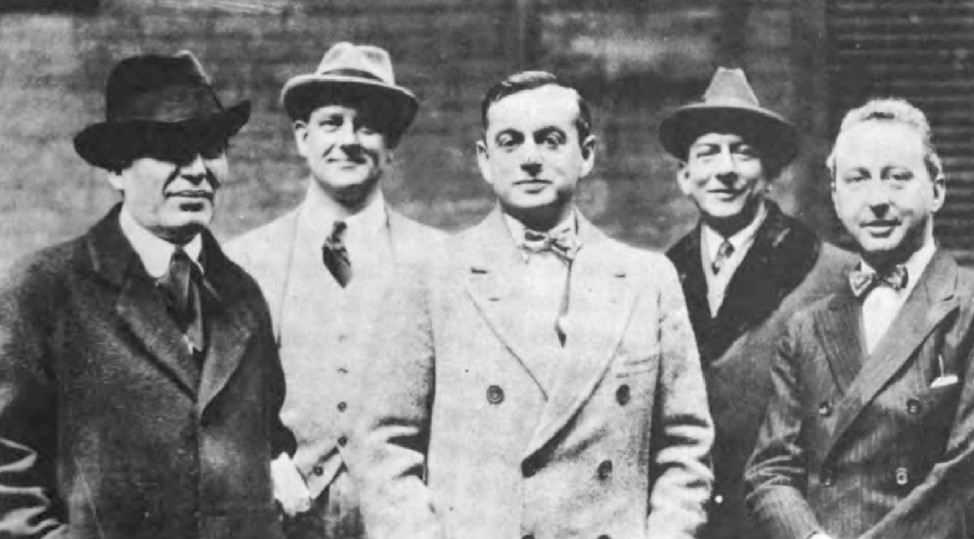
Morris Gest, Wodehouse, Guy Bolton, F. Ray Comstock and Jerome Kern, c. 1917

A third milestone in Wodehouse's life came towards the end of 1915: his old songwriting partner Jerome Kern introduced him to the writer Guy Bolton, who became Wodehouse's closest friend and a regular collaborator. Bolton and Kern had a musical, Very Good Eddie, running at the Princess Theatre in New York. The show was successful, but they thought the song lyrics weak and invited Wodehouse to join them on its successor. This was Miss Springtime (1916), which ran for 227 performances—a good run by the standards of the day. The team produced several more successes, including Leave It to Jane (1917), Oh, Boy! (1917–18) and Oh, Lady! Lady!! (1918), and Wodehouse and Bolton wrote a few more shows with other composers. (Note: The shows by the trio at the Princess and other New York theatres had runs varying from 475 performances for Oh, Boy! to 48 for Miss 1917.) In these musicals Wodehouse's lyrics won high praise from critics as well as fellow lyricists such as Ira Gershwin.

Unlike his original model, Gilbert, Wodehouse preferred the music to be written first, fitting his words into the melodies. Donaldson suggests that this is the reason why his lyrics have largely been overlooked in recent years: they fit the music perfectly, but do not stand on their own in verse form as Gilbert's do. Nonetheless, Donaldson adds, the book and lyrics for the Princess Theatre shows made the collaborators an enormous fortune and played an important part in the development of the American musical. In the Grove Dictionary of American Music Larry Stempel writes, "By presenting naturalistic stories and characters and attempting to integrate the songs and lyrics into the action of the libretto, these works brought a new level of intimacy, cohesion, and sophistication to American musical comedy." The theatre writer Gerald Bordman calls Wodehouse "the most observant, literate, and witty lyricist of his day". The composer Richard Rodgers wrote, "Before Larry Hart, only P. G. Wodehouse had made any real assault on the intelligence of the song-listening public."

=== 1920s ===
In the years after the war, Wodehouse steadily increased his sales, polished his existing characters and introduced new ones. Bertie and Jeeves, Lord Emsworth and his circle, and Ukridge appeared in novels and short stories; (Note: In The Inimitable Jeeves (1923) and Carry on Jeeves (1925); Leave it to Psmith (1923, a Blandings novel despite its title); and Ukridge (1924).) Psmith made his fourth and last appearance; (Note: In Leave it to Psmith (1923).) two new characters were the Oldest Member, narrating his series of golfing stories, and Mr Mulliner, telling his particularly tall tales to fellow patrons of the bar at the Angler's Rest. Various other young men-about-town appeared in short stories about members of the Drones Club. (Note: Among the members of this fictional Mayfair club are Psmith, Bertie Wooster, two of Mr Mulliner's nephews and Lord Emsworth's younger son, Freddie Threepwood. Fifty other young male Wodehouse characters are also identified as members. Wodehouse published two collections of short stories about the escapades of various Drones: Young Men in Spats (1936) and Eggs, Beans and Crumpets (1940). Members of the club feature in other collections, including A Few Quick Ones (1959) and Plum Pie (1966).)

Wodehouse's signature, undated

The Wodehouses returned to England, where they had a house in London for some years, but Wodehouse continued to cross the Atlantic frequently, spending substantial periods in New York. He continued to work in the theatre. During the 1920s he collaborated on nine musical comedies produced on Broadway or in the West End, including the long-running Sally (1920, New York), The Cabaret Girl (1922, London) and Rosalie (1928, New York). He also wrote non-musical plays, including The Play's the Thing (1926), adapted from Ferenc Molnár, and A Damsel in Distress (1928), a dramatisation of his 1919 novel.

Though never a naturally gregarious man, Wodehouse was more sociable in the 1920s than at other periods. Donaldson lists among those with whom he was on friendly terms writers including A. A. Milne, Ian Hay, Frederick Lonsdale and E. Phillips Oppenheim, and stage performers including George Grossmith Jr., Heather Thatcher and Dorothy Dickson.

=== Hollywood: 1929–1931 ===
There had been films of Wodehouse stories since 1915, when A Gentleman of Leisure was based on his 1910 novel of the same name. Further screen adaptations of his books were made between then and 1927, (Note: They included the feature films Uneasy Money (1918), A Damsel in Distress (1919), The Prince and Betty (1919), Piccadilly Jim (1920), Their Mutual Child (1920, from the novel published in the UK as The Coming of Bill), and The Small Bachelor (1927).) but it was not until 1929 that Wodehouse went to Hollywood where Bolton was working as a highly paid writer for Metro-Goldwyn-Mayer (MGM). Ethel was taken with both the financial and social aspects of Hollywood life, and she negotiated a contract with MGM on her husband's behalf under which he would be paid $2,000 a week. This large salary was particularly welcome because the couple had lost considerable sums in the Wall Street crash of 1929.

The actual work is negligible. ... So far, I have had eight collaborators. The system is that A. gets the original idea, B. comes in to work with him on it, C. makes a scenario, D. does preliminary dialogue, and then they send for me to insert Class and what-not. Then E. and F., scenario writers, alter the plot and off we go again.

— Wodehouse on working in Hollywood.

The contract started in May 1930, but the studio found little for Wodehouse to do, and he had spare time to write a novel and nine short stories. He commented, "It's odd how soon one comes to look on every minute as wasted that is given to earning one's salary." Even when the studio found a project for him to work on, the interventions of committees and constant rewriting by numerous contract authors meant that his ideas were rarely used. In a 2005 study of Wodehouse in Hollywood, Brian Taves writes that Those Three French Girls (1930) was "as close to a success as Wodehouse was to have at MGM. His only other credits were minimal, and the other projects he worked on were not produced."

Wodehouse's contract ended after a year and was not renewed. At MGM's request, he gave an interview to The Los Angeles Times. Wodehouse was described by Herbert Warren Wind as "politically naive [and] fundamentally unworldly", and he caused a sensation by saying publicly what he had already told his friends privately about Hollywood's inefficiency, arbitrary decision-making, and waste of expensive talent. The interview was reprinted in The New York Times, and there was much editorial comment about the state of the film industry. Many writers have considered that the interview precipitated a radical overhaul of the studio system, but Taves believes it to have been "a storm in a teacup", and Donaldson comments that, in the straitened post-crash era, the reforms would have been inevitable.

Wind's view of Wodehouse's naïveté is not universally held. Biographers including Donaldson, McCrum and Phelps suggest that his unworldliness was only part of a complex character, and that in some respects he was highly astute. He was unsparing of the studio owners in his early-1930s short stories set in Hollywood, which contain what Taves considers Wodehouse's sharpest and most biting satire.

=== Best-seller: 1930s ===
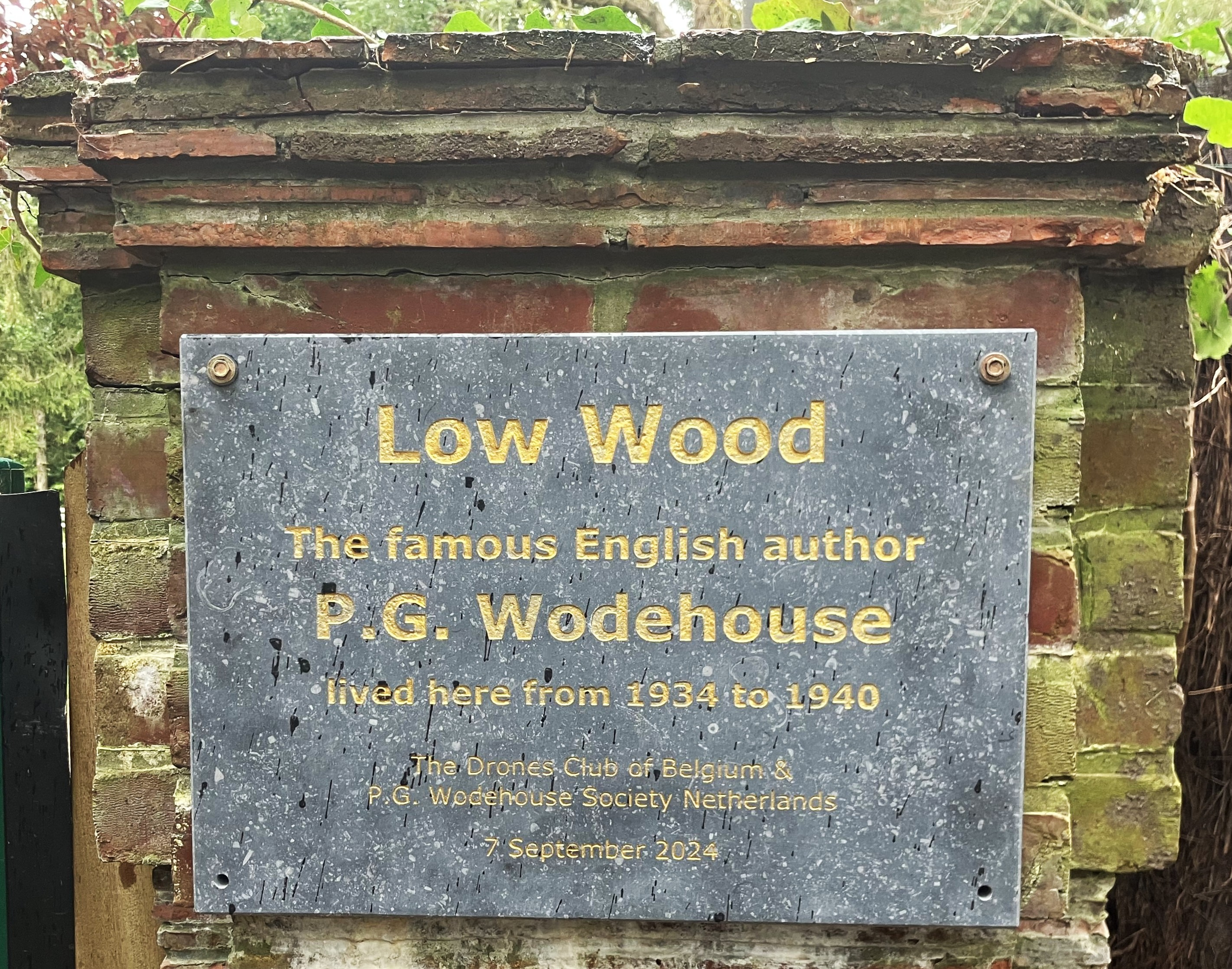
Commemorative plaque at the Villa Low Wood in Le Touquet

During the 1930s Wodehouse's theatrical work tailed off. He wrote or adapted four plays for the West End; Leave it to Psmith (1930), which he adapted in collaboration with Ian Hay, was the only one to have a long run. (Note: It ran for 156 performances; Who's Who co-written with Bolton ran for 19 performances; Good Morning. Bill for 78; and The Inside Stand for 50.) The reviewer in The Manchester Guardian praised the play, but commented: "It is Mr Wodehouse's own inimitable narrative comments and descriptions in his own person of the antics of his puppets that one misses. They cannot be got into a play and they are at least half the fun of the novels." In 1934 Wodehouse collaborated with Bolton on the book for Cole Porter's Anything Goes (Porter wrote his own lyrics), but at the last minute their version was almost entirely rewritten by others at the instigation of the producer, who disliked the original script. (Note: Bolton and Wodehouse's original book was set on a shipwrecked ocean liner; shortly before the Broadway opening a shipping disaster off the coast of New Jersey caused the deaths of 138 passengers and crew members. The producer decided that the plot would seem in bad taste in the circumstances, and was evidently glad of the pretext to jettison the original book, with which he was unhappy. For the London production in 1935 Wodehouse revised the dialogue and rewrote some of Porter's lyrics, substituting British topical references for the original American ones.) Concentrating on writing novels and short stories, Wodehouse reached the peak of his productivity in this decade, averaging two books each year, and grossing an annual £100,000. (Note: The average weekly industrial wage in Britain in 1938 was equal to £180 a year. Wodehouse's income was more than 500 times as much.) His practice of dividing his time between Britain and America caused Wodehouse difficulties with the tax authorities of both countries. Both the UK Inland Revenue and the US Internal Revenue Service sought to tax him as a resident. (Note: The two countries had not at that time reached the agreement that income tax is payable in one country or the other, but not in both.) The matter was settled after lengthy negotiations, but the Wodehouses decided to change their residential status beyond doubt by moving to France, where they bought a house near Le Touquet in the north.

There is no question that in making Mr P. G. Wodehouse a doctor of letters the University has done the right and popular thing. Everyone knows at least some of his many works and has felt all the better for the gaiety of his wit and the freshness of his style.

— The Times on Wodehouse's honorary doctorate, June 1939

In 1935 Wodehouse created the last of his regular cast of principal characters, Lord Ickenham, otherwise known as Uncle Fred, who, in Usborne's words, "leads the dance in four novels and a short story ... a whirring dynamo of misrule". His other books from the decade include Right Ho, Jeeves, which Donaldson judged his best work, Uncle Fred in the Springtime, which the writer Bernard Levin considered the best, and Blandings Castle, which contains "Lord Emsworth and the Girl Friend", which Rudyard Kipling thought "one of the most perfect short stories I have ever read".

Other leading literary figures who admired Wodehouse were A. E. Housman, Max Beerbohm and Hilaire Belloc; on the radio and in print Belloc called Wodehouse "the best writer of our time: the best living writer of English ... the head of my profession". Wodehouse regarded Belloc's plaudit as "a gag, to get a rise out of serious-minded authors whom he disliked". (Note: Among those to whom Wodehouse referred was Hugh Walpole. Wodehouse wrote to a friend, William Townend, "I can't remember if I ever told you about meeting Hugh when I was at Oxford getting my D.Litt. I was staying with the Vice-Chancellor at Magdalen and he blew in and spent the day. It was just after Hilaire Belloc had said that I was the best living English writer. It was just a gag, of course, but it worried Hugh terribly. He said to me, 'Did you see what Belloc said about you?' I said I had. 'I wonder why he said that.' 'I wonder,' I said. Long silence. 'I can't imagine why he said that,' said Hugh. I said I couldn't, either. Another long silence. 'It seems such an extraordinary thing to say!' 'Most extraordinary.' Long silence again. 'Ah, well,' said Hugh, having apparently found the solution, 'the old man's getting very old.'") Wodehouse was never sure that his books had literary merit as well as popular appeal, and, Donaldson suggests, must have been overwhelmed when the University of Oxford conferred an honorary doctorate of letters on him in June 1939. (Note: The Observer suggested that Jeeves should receive an honorary MA at the same time.) His visit to England for the awarding ceremony was the last time he set foot in his native land.

=== Second World War: internment and broadcasts ===
At the start of the Second World War Wodehouse and his wife remained at their Le Touquet house, where, during the Phoney War, he worked on Joy in the Morning. With the advance of the Germans, the nearby Royal Air Force base withdrew; Wodehouse was offered the sole spare seat in one of the fighter aircraft, but he turned down the opportunity as it would have meant leaving behind Ethel and their dog. On 21 May 1940, with German troops advancing through northern France, the Wodehouses decided to drive to Portugal and fly from there to the US. Two miles from home their car broke down, so they returned and borrowed a car from a neighbour; with the routes blocked with refugees, they returned home again.

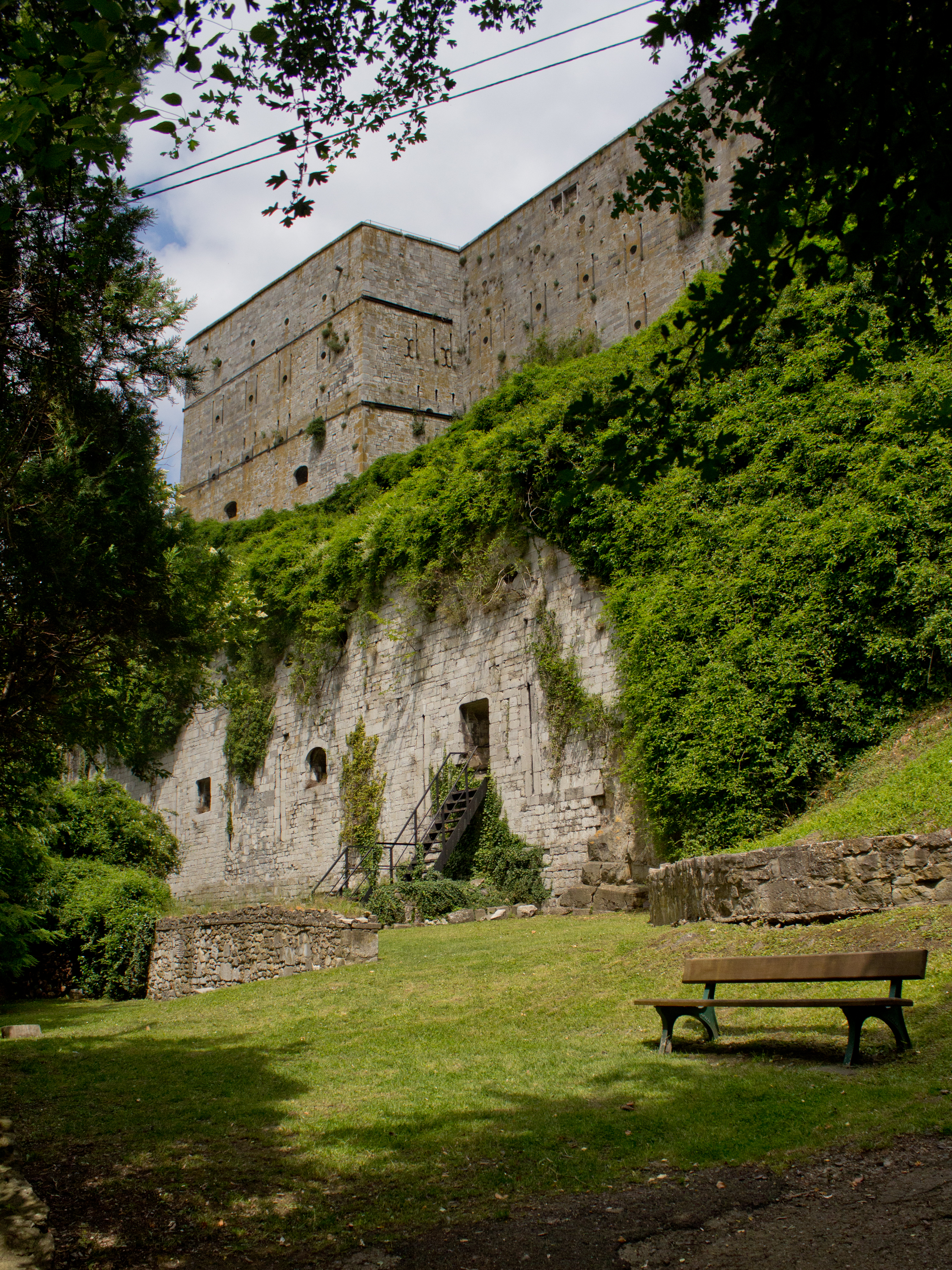
The Citadel of Huy, Belgium, where Wodehouse was imprisoned in 1940

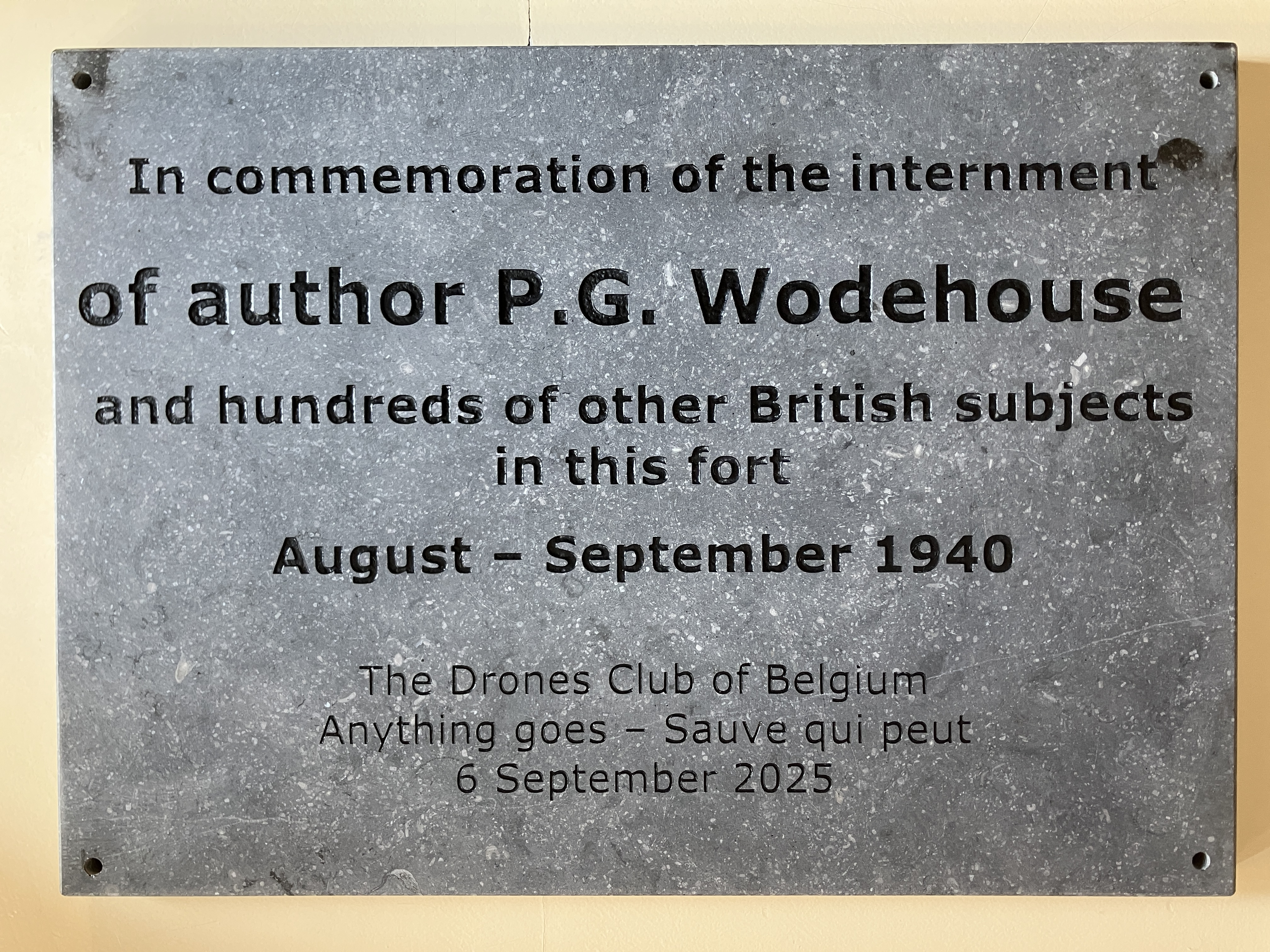
Commemorative plaque at the Citadel of Huy

The Germans occupied Le Touquet on 22 May 1940 and Wodehouse had to report to the authorities daily. After two months of occupation the Germans interned all male enemy nationals under 60, and Wodehouse was sent to a former prison in Loos, a suburb of Lille, on 21 July; Ethel remained in Le Touquet. The internees were placed four to a cell, each of which had been designed for one man. One bed was available per cell, which was made available to the eldest man—not Wodehouse, who slept on the granite floor. The prisoners were not kept long in Loos before they were transported in cattle trucks to a former barracks in Liège, Belgium, which was run as a prison by the SS. After a week the men were transferred to Huy in Liège Province, where they were incarcerated in the local citadel. They remained there until September 1940, when they were transported to Tost in Upper Silesia (then Germany, now Toszek in Poland). (Note: Wodehouse found the local countryside monotonous, and wrote, "There is a flat dullness about the countryside which has led many a visitor to say 'If this is Upper Silesia, what must Lower Silesia be like?'.")

Wodehouse's family and friends had not had any news of his location after the fall of France, but an article from an Associated Press reporter who had visited Tost in December 1940 led to pressure on the German authorities to release the novelist. This included a petition from influential people in the US; Senator W. Warren Barbour presented it to the German ambassador. Although his captors refused to release him, Wodehouse was provided with a typewriter and, to pass the time, he wrote Money in the Bank. Throughout his time in Tost, he sent postcards to his US literary agent asking for $5 to be sent to various people in Canada, mentioning his name. These were the families of Canadian prisoners of war, and the news from Wodehouse was the first indication that their sons were alive and well. Wodehouse risked severe punishment for the communication, but managed to evade the German censor.

I never was interested in politics. I'm quite unable to work up any kind of belligerent feeling. Just as I'm about to feel belligerent about some country I meet a decent sort of chap. We go out together and lose any fighting thoughts or feelings.

— Wodehouse, in his Berlin broadcasts.

On 21 June 1941, while he was in the middle of playing a game of cricket, Wodehouse received a visit from two members of the Gestapo. He was given ten minutes to pack his things before he was taken to the Hotel Adlon, a top luxury hotel in Berlin. He stayed there at his own expense; royalties from the German editions of his books had been put into a special frozen bank account at the outset of the war, and Wodehouse was permitted to draw upon this money he had earned while staying in Berlin. He was thus released from internment a few months before his sixtieth birthday—the age at which civilian internees were released by the Nazis. Shortly afterwards Wodehouse was, in the words of Phelps, "cleverly trapped" into making five broadcasts to the US via German radio, with the Berlin-based correspondent of the Columbia Broadcasting System. The broadcasts—aired on 28 June, 9, 23 and 30 July and 6 August—were titled How to be an Internee Without Previous Training, and comprised humorous anecdotes about Wodehouse's experiences as a prisoner, including some gentle mocking of his captors. The German propaganda ministry arranged for the recordings to be broadcast to Britain in August. The day after Wodehouse recorded his final programme, Ethel joined him in Berlin, having sold most of her jewellery to pay for the journey.

=== Aftermath: reactions and investigation ===
The reaction in Britain to Wodehouse's broadcasts was hostile, and he was "reviled ... as a traitor, collaborator, Nazi propagandist, and a coward", although, Phelps observes, many of those who decried his actions had not heard the content of the programmes. A front-page article in The Daily Mirror stated that Wodehouse "lived luxuriously because Britain laughed with him, but when the laughter was out of his country's heart, ... [he] was not ready to share her suffering. He hadn't the guts ... even to stick it out in the internment camp." In the House of Commons Anthony Eden, the Foreign Secretary, regretted Wodehouse's actions. Several libraries removed Wodehouse novels from their shelves.

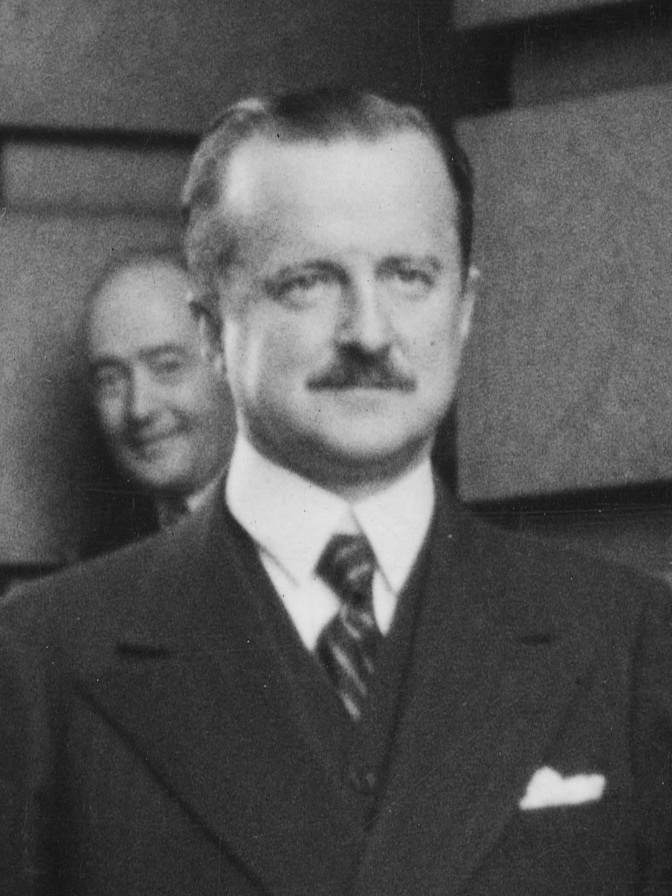
Duff Cooper, 1941

On 15 July the journalist William Connor, under his pen name Cassandra, broadcast a postscript to the news programme railing against Wodehouse. According to The Times, the broadcast "provoked a storm of complaint ... from listeners all over the country". Wodehouse's biographer, Joseph Connolly, thinks the broadcast "inaccurate, spiteful and slanderous"; Phelps calls it "probably the most vituperative attack on an individual ever heard on British radio". (Note: A third biographer, Benny Green, calls it "one of the most scurrilous personal attacks in the history of English journalism", while McCrum describes it as "breathtakingly intemperate, a polemic unique in the annals of the BBC".) The broadcast was made at the direct instruction of Duff Cooper, the Minister of Information, who overruled strong protests made by the BBC against the decision to air the programme. Numerous letters appeared in the British press, both supporting and criticising Wodehouse. The letters page of The Daily Telegraph became a focus for censuring Wodehouse, including one from Wodehouse's friend, A. A. Milne; a reply from their fellow author Compton Mackenzie in defence of Wodehouse was not published because the editor claimed a lack of space. (Note: Mackenzie said he had "an old-fashioned prejudice against condemning a man unheard"; he added that "I feel more disgusted by Mr Milne's morality than by Mr Wodehouse's irresponsibility.") Most of those defending Wodehouse against accusations of disloyalty, including Sax Rohmer, Dorothy L. Sayers and Gilbert Frankau, conceded that he had acted stupidly. Some members of the public wrote to the newspapers to say that the full facts were not yet known and a fair judgement could not be made until they were. The management of the BBC, who considered Wodehouse's actions no worse than "ill advised", pointed out to Cooper that there was no evidence at that point whether Wodehouse had acted voluntarily or under compulsion.

When Wodehouse heard of the furore the broadcasts had caused, he contacted the Foreign Office—through the Swiss embassy in Berlin—to explain his actions, and attempted to return home via neutral countries, but the German authorities refused to let him leave. In Performing Flea, a 1953 collection of letters, Wodehouse wrote, "Of course I ought to have had the sense to see that it was a loony thing to do to use the German radio for even the most harmless stuff, but I didn't. I suppose prison life saps the intellect." The reaction in America was mixed: the left-leaning publication PM accused Wodehouse of "play[ing] Jeeves to the Nazis", but the Department of War used the interviews as an ideal representation of anti-Nazi propaganda.

The broadcasts, in point of fact, are neither anti- nor pro-German, but just Wodehousian. He is a man singularly ill-fitted to live in a time of ideological conflict, having no feelings of hatred about anyone, and no very strong views about anything. ... I never heard him speak bitterly about anyone—not even about old friends who turned against him in distress. Such temperament does not make for good citizenship in the second half of the Twentieth Century.

— Malcolm Muggeridge, discussing Wodehouse's wartime broadcasts from Germany.

The Wodehouses remained in Germany until September 1943, when, because of the Allied bombings, they were allowed to move back to Paris. They were living there when the city was liberated on 25 August 1944; Wodehouse reported to the American authorities the following day, asking them to inform the British of his whereabouts. He was subsequently visited by Malcolm Muggeridge, recently arrived in Paris as an intelligence officer with MI6. The young officer quickly came to like Wodehouse and considered the question of treasonable behaviour as "ludicrous"; he summed up the writer as "ill-fitted to live in an age of ideological conflict". On 9 September Wodehouse was visited by an MI5 officer and former barrister, Major Edward Cussen, who formally investigated him, a process that stretched over four days. On 28 September Cussen filed his report, which states that in regard to the broadcasts, Wodehouse's behaviour "has been unwise", but advised against further action. On 23 November Theobald Matthew, the Director of Public Prosecutions, decided there was no evidence to justify prosecuting Wodehouse. (Note: Neither Cussen's report or Matthew's decision was communicated to Wodehouse; they were not released to the public until 1980.)

In November 1944 Duff Cooper was appointed British ambassador to France and was provided accommodation at the Hôtel Le Bristol, where the Wodehouses were living. Cooper complained to the French authorities, and the couple were moved to a different hotel. The Wodehouses were subsequently arrested by French police and placed under preventive detention, despite no charges being presented. When Muggeridge tracked them down later, he managed to get Ethel released straight away and, four days later, ensured that the French authorities declared Wodehouse unwell and put him in a nearby hospital, which was more comfortable than where they had been detained. While in this hospital, Wodehouse worked on his novel Uncle Dynamite.

While still detained by the French, Wodehouse was again mentioned in questions in the House of Commons in December 1944 when MPs wondered if the French authorities could repatriate him to stand trial. Eden stated that the "matter has been gone into, and, according to the advice given, there are no grounds upon which we could take action". Two months later, Orwell wrote the essay "In Defence of P. G. Wodehouse", (Note: The article was published in the July edition of Windmill magazine.) where he stated that "it is important to realise that the events of 1941 do not convict Wodehouse of anything worse than stupidity". Orwell's rationale was that Wodehouse's "moral outlook has remained that of a public-school boy, and according to the public-school code, treachery in time of war is the most unforgivable of all the sins", which was compounded by his "complete lack—so far as one can judge from his printed works—of political awareness".

On 15 January 1945 the French authorities released Wodehouse, but they did not inform him, until June 1946, that he would not face any official charges and was free to leave the country. (Note: A 2013 drama produced by BBC 4 titled Wodehouse in Exile looked at the circumstances surrounding Wodehouse's wartime experience and the subsequent reaction.)

=== American exile: 1946–1975 ===
Having secured American visas in July 1946, the Wodehouses made preparations to return to New York. They were delayed by Ethel's insistence on acquiring suitable new clothes and by Wodehouse's wish to finish writing the novel The Mating Season in the peace of the French countryside. In April 1947 they sailed to New York, where Wodehouse was relieved at the friendly reception he received from the large press contingent awaiting his arrival. Ethel secured a comfortable penthouse apartment in Manhattan's Upper East Side, but Wodehouse was not at ease. The New York that he had known before the war was much changed. The magazines that had paid lavishly for his stories were in decline, and those that remained were not much interested in him. He was sounded out about writing for Broadway, but he was not at home in the post-war theatre; (Note: He wrote to Bolton, "Apparently you have to write your show and get it composed and then give a series of auditions to backers, instead of having the management line up a couple of stars and then get a show written for them.") he had money problems, with large sums temporarily tied up in Britain, and for the first time in his career he had no ideas for a new novel. He did not complete one until 1951.

Wodehouse remained unsettled until he and Ethel left New York City for Long Island. Bolton and his wife lived in the prosperous hamlet of Remsenburg, part of the Southampton area of Long Island, 77 miles (124 km) east of Manhattan. Wodehouse stayed with them frequently, and in 1952 he and Ethel bought a house nearby. They lived at Remsenburg for the rest of their lives. Between 1952 and 1975 he published more than twenty novels, as well as two collections of short stories, a heavily edited collection of his letters, a volume of memoirs, and a selection of his magazine articles. (Note: Respectively, A Few Quick Ones (1958), Plum Pie (1966), Performing Flea (1953), Bring on the Girls! (1954, jointly with Guy Bolton) and Over Seventy (1957).) He continued to hanker after a revival of his theatrical career. A 1959 off-Broadway revival of the 1917 Bolton-Wodehouse-Kern Leave It to Jane was a surprise hit, running for 928 performances, but his few post-war stage works, some in collaboration with Bolton, made little impression.

For Mr Wodehouse there has been no fall of Man; no 'aboriginal calamity'. His characters have never tasted the forbidden fruit. They are still in Eden. The gardens of Blandings Castle are that original garden from which we are all exiled. ... Mr Wodehouse's idyllic world can never stale. He will continue to release future generations from captivity that may be more irksome than our own. He has made a world for us to live in and delight in.

— Evelyn Waugh, 1961

Although Ethel made a return visit to England in 1948 to shop and visit family and friends, Wodehouse never left America after his arrival in 1947. It was not until 1965 that the British government indicated privately that he could return without fear of legal proceedings, and by then he felt too old to make the journey. The biographers Benny Green and Robert McCrum both take the view that this exile benefited Wodehouse's writing, helping him to go on depicting an idealised England seen in his mind's eye, rather than as it actually was in the post-war decades. During their years in Long Island, the couple often took in stray animals and contributed substantial funds to a local animal shelter. (Note: The Wodehouses contributed $35,000 to the "Bide-a-Wee" shelter, and it would have received $300,000 in Wodehouse's will had it not been for a change in its managerial regime of which the Wodehouses disapproved.)

In 1955 Wodehouse became an American citizen, though he remained a British subject, and was therefore still eligible for UK state honours. He was considered for the award of a knighthood three times from 1967, but the honour was twice blocked by British officials. (Note: On both occasions the block was at the behest of the British ambassador to the US, Sir Patrick Dean in 1967 and his successor Lord Cromer in 1971.) In 1974 the British prime minister, Harold Wilson, intervened to secure a knighthood (KBE) for Wodehouse, which was announced in the January 1975 New Year Honours list. The Times commented that Wodehouse's honour signalled "official forgiveness for his wartime indiscretion. ... It is late, but not too late, to take the sting out of that unhappy incident."

The following month Wodehouse entered Southampton Hospital, Long Island, for treatment of a skin complaint. While there, he suffered a heart attack and died on 14 February 1975 at the age of 93. He was buried at Remsenburg Presbyterian Church four days later. Ethel outlived him by more than nine years; Leonora had predeceased him, dying suddenly in 1944.

== Writing ==
=== Technique and approach ===
When in due course Charon ferries me across the Styx and everyone is telling everyone else what a rotten writer I was, I hope at least one voice will be heard piping up, 'But he did take trouble.'

— Wodehouse on Wodehouse, 1957

Before starting a book Wodehouse would write up to four hundred pages of notes bringing together an outline of the plot; he acknowledged that "It's the plots that I find so hard to work out. It takes such a long time to work one out." He always completed the plot before working on specific character actions. For a novel the note-writing process could take up to two years, and he would usually have two or more novels in preparation simultaneously. After he had completed his notes, he would draw up a fuller scenario of about thirty thousand words, which ensured plot holes were avoided, and allowed for the dialogue to begin to develop. When interviewed in 1975 he revealed that "For a humorous novel you've got to have a scenario, and you've got to test it so that you know where the comedy comes in, where the situations come in ... splitting it up into scenes (you can make a scene of almost anything) and have as little stuff in between as possible." He preferred working between 4 and 7 pm—but never after dinner—and would work seven days a week. In his younger years, he would write around two to three thousand words a day, although he slowed as he aged, so that in his nineties he would produce a thousand. The reduced speed in writing slowed his production of books: when younger he would produce a novel in about three months, while Bachelors Anonymous, published in 1973, took around six months. Although studies of language production in normal healthy ageing show a marked decline from the mid-70s on, a study of Wodehouse's works did not find any evidence of a decline in linguistic ability with age.

Wodehouse believed that one of the factors that made his stories humorous was his view of life, and he stated that "If you take life fairly easily, then you take a humorous view of things. It's probably because you were born that way." He carried this view through into his writing, describing the approach as "making the thing a sort of musical comedy without music, and ignoring real life altogether". The literary critic Edward L. Galligan considers Wodehouse's stories to show his mastery in adapting the form of the American musical comedy for his writings. Wodehouse would ensure that his first draft was as carefully and accurately done as possible, correcting and refining the prose as he wrote, and would then make another good copy, before proofreading again and then making a final copy for his publisher.

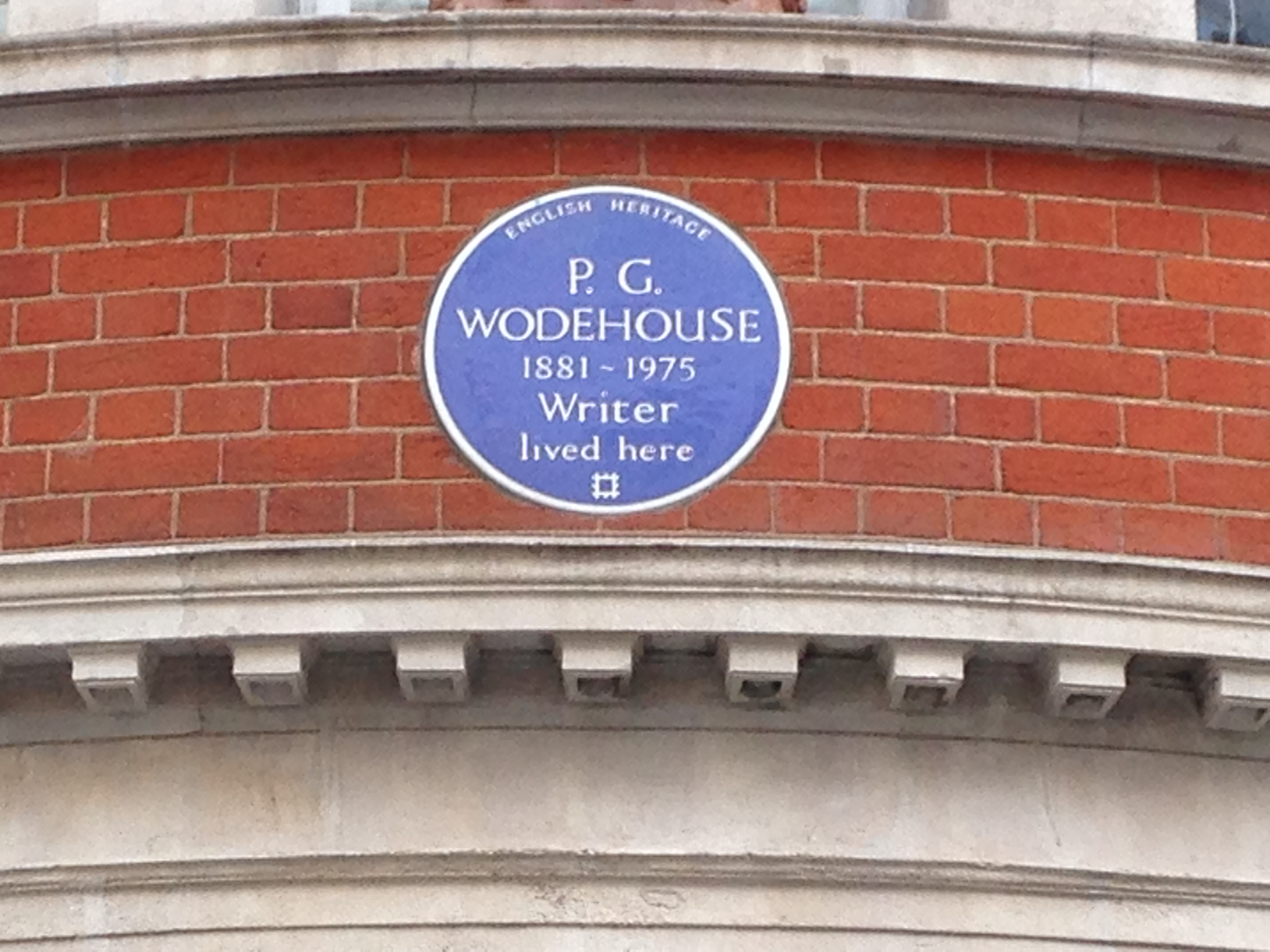
The English Heritage blue plaque for Wodehouse at 17 Dunraven Street, Mayfair, in the City of Westminster

Most of Wodehouse's canon is set in an undated period around the 1920s and 1930s. The critic Anthony Lejeune describes the settings of Wodehouse's novels, such as the Drones Club and Blandings Castle, as "a fairyland". Although some critics thought Wodehouse's fiction was based on a world that had never existed, Wodehouse affirmed that "it did. It was going strong between the wars", although he agreed that his version was to some extent "a sort of artificial world of my own creation". The novels showed a largely unchanging world, regardless of when they were written, and only rarely—and mistakenly in McCrum's view—did Wodehouse allow modernity to intrude, as he did in the 1966 story "Bingo Bans the Bomb".

When dealing with the dialogue in his novels, Wodehouse would consider the book's characters as if they were actors in a play, ensuring that the main roles were kept suitably employed throughout the storyline, which must be strong: "If they aren't in interesting situations, characters can't be major characters, not even if you have the rest of the troop talk their heads off about them." Many of Wodehouse's parts were stereotypes, and he acknowledged that "a real character in one of my books sticks out like a sore thumb". The publisher Michael Joseph identifies that even within the stereotypes Wodehouse understood human nature, and therefore "shares with [Charles] Dickens and Charles Chaplin the ability to present the comic resistance of the individual against those superior forces to which we are all subject".

Much of Wodehouse's use of slang terms reflects the influence of his time at school in Dulwich, and partly reflects Edwardian slang. As a young man he enjoyed the literary works of Arthur Conan Doyle and Jerome K. Jerome, and the operatic works of Gilbert and Sullivan. Wodehouse quotes from and alludes to numerous poets throughout his work. The scholar Clarke Olney lists those quoted, including Milton, Byron, Longfellow, Coleridge, Swinburne, Tennyson, Wordsworth and Shakespeare. Another favoured source was the King James Bible.

=== Language ===
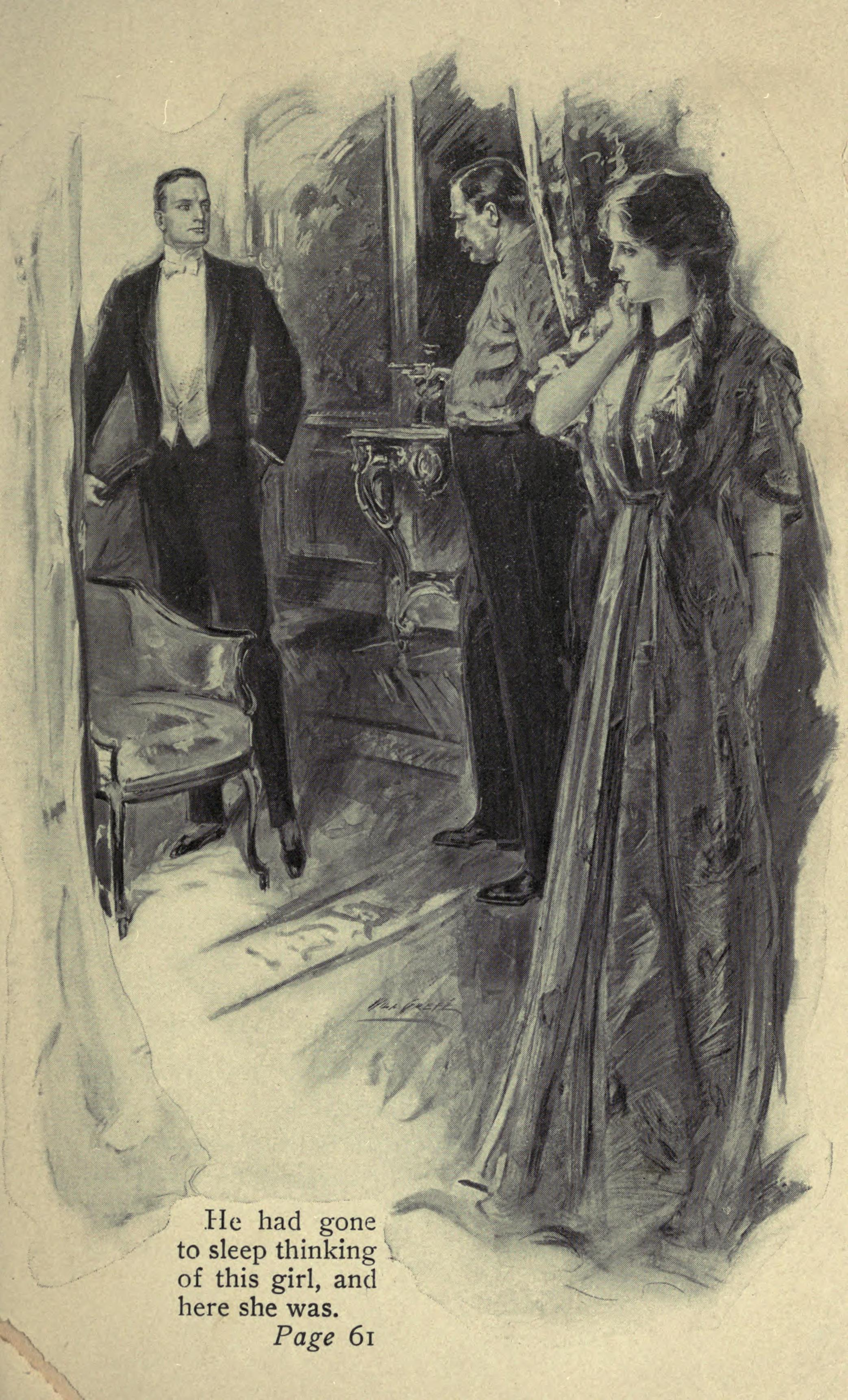
Illustration from the 1910 novel A Gentleman of Leisure

In 1941 the Concise Cambridge History of English Literature opined that Wodehouse had "a gift for highly original aptness of phrase that almost suggests a poet struggling for release among the wild extravagances of farce", while McCrum thinks that Wodehouse manages to combine "high farce with the inverted poetry of his mature comic style", particularly in The Code of the Woosters; the novelist Anthony Powell believes Wodehouse to be a "comic poet". Robert A. Hall Jr., in his study of Wodehouse's style and technique, describes the author as a master of prose, an opinion also shared by Levin, who considers Wodehouse "one of the finest and purest writers of English prose". Hall identifies several techniques used by Wodehouse to achieve comic effect, including the creation of new words through adding or removing prefixes and suffixes, so when Pongo Twistleton removes the housemaid Elsie Bean from a cupboard, Wodehouse writes that the character "de-Beaned the cupboard". Wodehouse created new words by splitting others in two, thus Wodehouse divides "hobnobbing" when he writes: "To offer a housemaid a cigarette is not hobbing. Nor, when you light it for her, does that constitute nobbing."

Richard Voorhees, Wodehouse's biographer, believes that the author used clichés in a deliberate and ironic manner. His opinion is shared by the academic Stephen Medcalf, who deems Wodehouse's skill is to "bring a cliché just enough to life to kill it", although Pamela March, writing in The Christian Science Monitor, considers Wodehouse to have "an ability to decliché a cliché". Medcalf provides an example from Right Ho, Jeeves in which the teetotal Gussie Fink-Nottle has surreptitiously been given whisky and gin in a punch prior to a prize-giving:

'It seems to me, Jeeves, that the ceremony may be one fraught with considerable interest.'
'Yes, sir.'
'What, in your opinion, will the harvest be?'
'One finds it difficult to hazard a conjecture, sir.'
'You mean imagination boggles?'
'Yes, sir.'
I inspected my imagination. He was right. It boggled.

The stylistic device most commonly found in Wodehouse's work is his use of comparative imagery that includes similes. Hall opines that the humour comes from Wodehouse's ability to accentuate "resemblances which at first glance seem highly incongruous". Examples can be seen in Joy in the Morning, Chapter 29: "There was a sound in the background like a distant sheep coughing gently on a mountainside. Jeeves sailing into action", or Psmith, Chapter 7: "A sound like two or three pigs feeding rather noisily in the middle of a thunderstorm interrupted his meditation." Hall also identifies that periodically Wodehouse used the stylistic device of a transferred epithet, with an adjective that properly belongs to a person applied instead to some inanimate object. The form of expression is used sparingly by Wodehouse in comparison with other mechanisms, only once or twice in a story or novel, according to Hall.

"I balanced a thoughtful lump of sugar on the teaspoon."
—Joy in the Morning, Chapter 5

"As I sat in the bath-tub, soaping a meditative foot ..."
—Jeeves and the Feudal Spirit, Chapter 1

"The first thing he did was to prod Jeeves in the lower ribs with an uncouth forefinger."
—Much Obliged, Jeeves, Chapter 4

Wordplay is a key element in Wodehouse's writing. This can take the form of puns, such as in Jeeves and the Feudal Spirit, when Bertie is released after a night in the police cells, and says that he has "a pinched look" about him. Linguistic confusion is another humorous mechanism, such as in Uncle Dynamite when Constable Potter says he has been "assaulted by the duck pond". In reply, Sir Aylmer, confusing the two meanings of the word "by", asks: "How the devil can you be assaulted by a duck pond?" Wodehouse also uses metaphor and mixed metaphor to add humour. Some come through exaggeration, such as Bingo Little's infant child who "not only has the aspect of a mass murderer, but that of a mass murderer suffering from an ingrown toenail", or Wooster's complaint that "the rumpuses that Bobbie Wickham is already starting may be amusing to her, but not to the unfortunate toads beneath the harrow whom she ruthlessly plunges into the soup." Bertie Wooster's half-forgotten vocabulary also provides a further humorous device. In Jeeves and the Feudal Spirit Bertie asks Jeeves "Let a plugugly like young Thos loose in the community with a cosh, and you are inviting disaster and ... what's the word? Something about cats." Jeeves replies, "Cataclysms, sir?"

== Reception and reputation ==
=== Literary reception ===
Wodehouse's early career as a lyricist and playwright was profitable, and his work with Bolton, according to The Guardian, "was one of the most successful in the history of musical comedy". At the outbreak of the Second World War he was earning £40,000 a year from his work, which had broadened to include novels and short stories. Following the furore ensuing from the wartime broadcasts, he suffered a downturn in his popularity and book sales; The Saturday Evening Post stopped publishing his short stories, a stance they reversed in 1965, although his popularity—and the sales figures—slowly recovered over time.

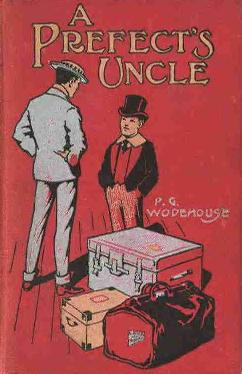
Cover of Wodehouse's 1903 novel A Prefect's Uncle

Wodehouse received great praise from many of his contemporaries, including Max Beerbohm, Rudyard Kipling, A. E. Housman and Evelyn Waugh—the last of whom opines, "One has to regard a man as a Master who can produce on average three uniquely brilliant and entirely original similes on each page." There are dissenters to the praise. The writer Alan Bennett thinks that "inspired though his language is, I can never take more than ten pages of the novels at a time, their relentless flippancy wearing and tedious", while the literary critic Q. D. Leavis writes that Wodehouse had a "stereotyped humour ... of ingenious variations on a laugh in one place". In a 2010 study of Wodehouse's few relatively serious novels, such as The Coming of Bill (1919), Jill the Reckless (1920) and The Adventures of Sally (1922), David Heddendorf concludes that though their literary quality does not match that of the farcical novels, they show a range of empathy and interests that in real life—and in his most comic works—the author seemed to lack. "Never oblivious to grief and despair, he opts in clear-eyed awareness for his timeless world of spats and woolly-headed peers. It's an austere, almost bloodless preference for pristine artifice over the pain and messy outcomes of actual existence, but it's a case of Wodehouse keeping faith with his own unique art."

The American literary analyst Robert F. Kiernan, defining "camp" as "excessive stylization of whatever kind", brackets Wodehouse as "a master of the camp novel", along with Thomas Love Peacock, Max Beerbohm, Ronald Firbank, E. F. Benson and Ivy Compton-Burnett. The literary critic and writer Cyril Connolly calls Wodehouse a "politicians' author"—one who does "not like art to be exacting and difficult". (Note: Alongside Wodehouse, Connolly listed light music, Mickey Mouse, the Oxford Book of Verse and the works of Edgar Wallace and Mary Webb.) Two former British prime ministers, H. H. Asquith and Tony Blair, are on record as Wodehouse aficionados, and the latter became a patron of the Wodehouse Society. Seán O'Casey, a successful playwright of the 1920s, thought little of Wodehouse; he commented in 1941 that it was damaging to England's dignity that the public or "the academic government of Oxford, dead from the chin up" considered Wodehouse an important figure in English literature. His jibe that Wodehouse was "English literature's performing flea" provided his target with the title of his collected letters, published in 1953. McCrum, writing in 2004, observes, "Wodehouse is more popular today than on the day he died", and "his comic vision has an absolutely secure place in the English literary imagination".

=== Honours and influence ===
The proposed nominations of Wodehouse for a knighthood in 1967 and 1971 were blocked for fear that such an award would "revive the controversy of his wartime behaviour and give currency to a Bertie Wooster image of the British character which the embassy was doing its best to eradicate". When Wodehouse was awarded the knighthood, only four years later, the journalist Dennis Barker wrote in The Guardian that the writer was "the solitary surviving English literary comic genius". After his death six weeks later, the journalist Michael Davie, writing in the same paper, observed that "Many people regarded ... [Wodehouse] as he regarded Beachcomber, as 'one, if not more than one, of England's greatest men'", while in the view of the obituarist for The Times Wodehouse "was a comic genius recognized in his lifetime as a classic and an old master of farce". In September 2019 Wodehouse was commemorated with a memorial stone in Westminster Abbey; the dedication was held two days after it was installed.

Since Wodehouse's death there have been numerous adaptations and dramatisations of his work on television and film; Wodehouse himself has been portrayed on radio and screen numerous times. (Note: On screen he has been played by Peter Woodward in Wodehouse on Broadway (BBC, 1989); and Tim Pigott-Smith in Wodehouse in Exile (BBC, 2013). On radio he has been played by Benjamin Whitrow (BBC, 1999); and twice by Tim McInnerny (BBC, 2008 and 2010).) There are several literary societies dedicated to Wodehouse. The P. G. Wodehouse Society (UK) was founded in 1997 and has over 1,000 members as at 2015. Alexander Armstrong became president of the society in 2017; past presidents have included Terry Wogan and Richard Briers. There are also groups of Wodehouse fans in Australia, Belgium, France, Finland, India, Italy, Russia, Sweden and the US. As at 2015 the Oxford English Dictionary contains over 1,750 quotations from Wodehouse, illustrating terms from crispish to zippiness. Voorhees, while acknowledging that Wodehouse's antecedents in literature range from Ben Jonson to Oscar Wilde, writes:

[I]t is now abundantly clear that Wodehouse is one of the funniest and most productive men who ever wrote in English. He is far from being a mere jokesmith: he is an authentic craftsman, a wit and humorist of the first water, the inventor of a prose style which is a kind of comic poetry.

== Notes, references and sources ==
=== Sources ===
- Belloc, Hilaire (2012) [1939]. "Introduction". In P. G. Wodehouse (ed.). Weekend Wodehouse. London: Arrow Books. ISBN 978-0-09-955814-9.
- Bennett, Alan (2006) [2003]. Untold Stories. London: Faber and Faber. ISBN 978-0-571-22831-7.
- Connolly, Joseph (1987) [1979]. P. G. Wodehouse. London: Thames and Hudson. ISBN 978-0-500-26027-2.
- Donaldson, Frances (1983) [1982]. P. G. Wodehouse: A Biography. London: Futura. ISBN 978-0-7088-2356-9.
- Easdale, Roderick (2014). The Novel Life of P. G. Wodehouse. Luton, UK: Andrews. ISBN 978-1-78333-828-3.
- French, R.D.B. (1966). P. G. Wodehouse. Writers and Critics. Edinburgh and London: Oliver and Boyd. OCLC 899087471.
- Gaye, Freda, ed. (1967). Who's Who in the Theatre (fourteenth ed.). London: Sir Isaac Pitman and Sons. OCLC 5997224.
- Green, Benny (1981). P. G. Wodehouse: A Literary Biography. London: Pavilion. ISBN 978-0-19-281390-9.
- Green, Stanley (1980) [1976]. Encyclopedia of the Musical Theatre. New York: Da Capo Press. ISBN 978-0-306-80113-6.
- Hart-Davis, Rupert (1997) [1952]. Hugh Walpole. Stroud, UK: Sutton. ISBN 978-0-7509-1491-8.
- Jaggard, Geoffrey (1967). Wooster's World. London: Macdonald. OCLC 2192308.
- Jasen, David A. (1975). P. G. Wodehouse: A Portrait of a Master. London: Garnstone. ISBN 978-0-85511-190-8.
- Leavis, Queenie (1968). Fiction and the Reading Public. London: Chatto and Windus. OCLC 800020590.
- McCrum, Robert (2004). Wodehouse: A Life. London: Viking. ISBN 978-0-670-89692-9.
- McIlvaine, Eileen (1990). P. G. Wodehouse: A Comprehensive Bibliography and Checklist. New York: J. H. Heineman. ISBN 978-0-87008-125-5.
- Murphy, N.T.P. (2015). The P. G. Wodehouse Miscellany. Stroud: History Press. ISBN 978-0-7509-5964-3.
- Napper, Lawrence (2010). "British Gaiety". In Steven Cohan (ed.). The Sound of Musicals. London: British Film Institute. ISBN 978-1-84457-347-9.
- Orwell, George (2000). Essays. London: Penguin Books. ISBN 978-0-14-118306-0.
- Pavlovski, Linda; Darga, Scott T., eds. (2001). "P. G. Wodehouse". Twentieth-Century Literary Criticism, Vol. 108. Detroit: Gale Research. ISBN 978-0-7876-4568-7.
- Phelps, Barry (1992). P. G. Wodehouse: Man and Myth. London: Constable. ISBN 978-0-09-471620-9.
- Sampson, George (1941). The Concise Cambridge History of English Literature. Cambridge: Cambridge University Press. OCLC 254919621.
- Taves, Brian (Summer 2005). "P. G. Wodehouse and Hollywood". Southern California Quarterly. 87 (2): 123–169. doi:10.2307/41172259. JSTOR 41172259. (subscription required)
- Usborne, Richard (1976). Wodehouse at Work to the End. London: Barrie and Jenkins. ISBN 978-0-214-20211-7.
- Voorhees, Richard (1966). P. G. Wodehouse. New York: Twayne. OCLC 1079135.
- Voorhees, Richard (1985). "P. G. Wodehouse". In Stayley, Thomas F. (ed.). Dictionary of Literary Biography: British Novelists, 1890–1929: Traditionalists. Detroit: Gale. ISBN 978-0-8103-1712-3.
- White, Laura M. (2009). "P. G. Wodehouse". In St. Pierre, Paul Matthew (ed.). Dictionary of Literary Biography: Twentieth-Century British Humorists. Detroit: Gale. ISBN 978-0-7876-8170-8.
- Wind, Herbert Warren (1981). The World of P. G. Wodehouse. London: Hutchinson. ISBN 978-0-09-145670-2.
- Wodehouse, P. G. (1957). Over Seventy. London: Herbert Jenkins. OCLC 163761062.
- Wodehouse, P. G. (1953). Performing Flea: A Self-Portrait in Letters. London: Herbert Jenkins. OCLC 1231262.
- Wodehouse, P. G. (1979) [1915]. Something Fresh. Harmondsworth, UK: Penguin. ISBN 978-0-14-005035-6.
- Wodehouse, P. G. (1974). The World of Psmith. London: Barrie and Jenkins. ISBN 978-0-214-20000-7.
- Wodehouse, P.G. (1990). Frances Donaldson (ed.). Yours, Plum: The Letters of P. G. Wodehouse. London: Hutchinson. ISBN 978-0-09-174639-1.
- Wodehouse, P. G. (2013). Sophie Ratcliffe (ed.). P. G. Wodehouse: A Life in Letters. London: Arrow. ISBN 978-0-09-951479-4.
