= P. G. Wodehouse bibliography =

Bibliography of P. G. Wodehouse

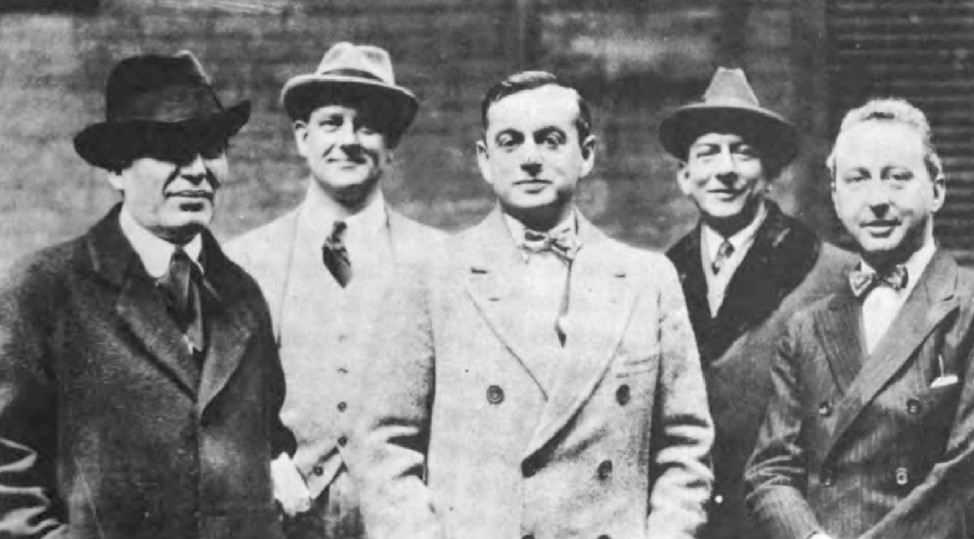
- Morris Gest, Wodehouse, Guy Bolton, F. Ray Comstock and Jerome Kern, c. 1917
- Novels↙: 71
- Collections↙: 24
- Poems↙: 1
- Plays↙: 42
- Scripts↙: 15
- Letters↙: 2
- Autobiographies↙: 3
- Miscellany↙: 2

Sir Pelham Grenville Wodehouse, KBE (/ˈwʊdhaʊs/; 1881–1975) was a prolific English author, humorist and scriptwriter. After being educated at Dulwich College, to which he remained devoted all his life, he was employed by a bank, but disliked the work and wrote magazine pieces in his spare time. In 1902 he published his first novel, The Pothunters, set at the fictional public school of St. Austin's; his early stories continued the school theme. He also used the school setting in his short story collections, which started in 1903 with the publication of Tales of St. Austin's.

Throughout his novel- and story-writing career Wodehouse created several regular comic characters with whom the public became familiar. These include Bertie Wooster and his valet Jeeves; the immaculate and loquacious Psmith; Lord Emsworth and the Blandings Castle set; the disaster-prone opportunist Ukridge; the Oldest Member, with stories about golf; and Mr Mulliner, with tales on numerous subjects from film studios to the Church of England.

Wodehouse also wrote scripts and screenplays and, in August 1911, his script A Gentleman of Leisure was produced on the Broadway stage. In the 1920s and 1930s he collaborated with Jerome Kern and Guy Bolton in an arrangement that "helped transform the American musical" of the time; in the Grove Dictionary of American Music Larry Stempel writes, "By presenting naturalistic stories and characters and attempting to integrate the songs and lyrics into the action of the libretto, these works brought a new level of intimacy, cohesion, and sophistication to American musical comedy." His writing for plays also turned into scriptwriting, starting with the 1915 film A Gentleman of Leisure. He joined Metro-Goldwyn-Mayer (MGM) in 1930 for a year, and then worked for RKO Pictures in 1937.

At the outbreak of the Second World War, and while living in northern France, Wodehouse was captured by the Germans and was interned for over a year. After his release he was tricked into making five comic and apolitical broadcasts on German radio to the still neutral US. After vehement protests in Britain, Wodehouse never returned to his home country, despite being cleared by an MI5 investigation. He moved to the US permanently in 1947 and took American citizenship in 1955, retaining his British nationality. He died in 1975, at the age of 93, in Southampton, New York, one month after he was awarded a knighthood of the Order of the British Empire (KBE).

== Novels ==
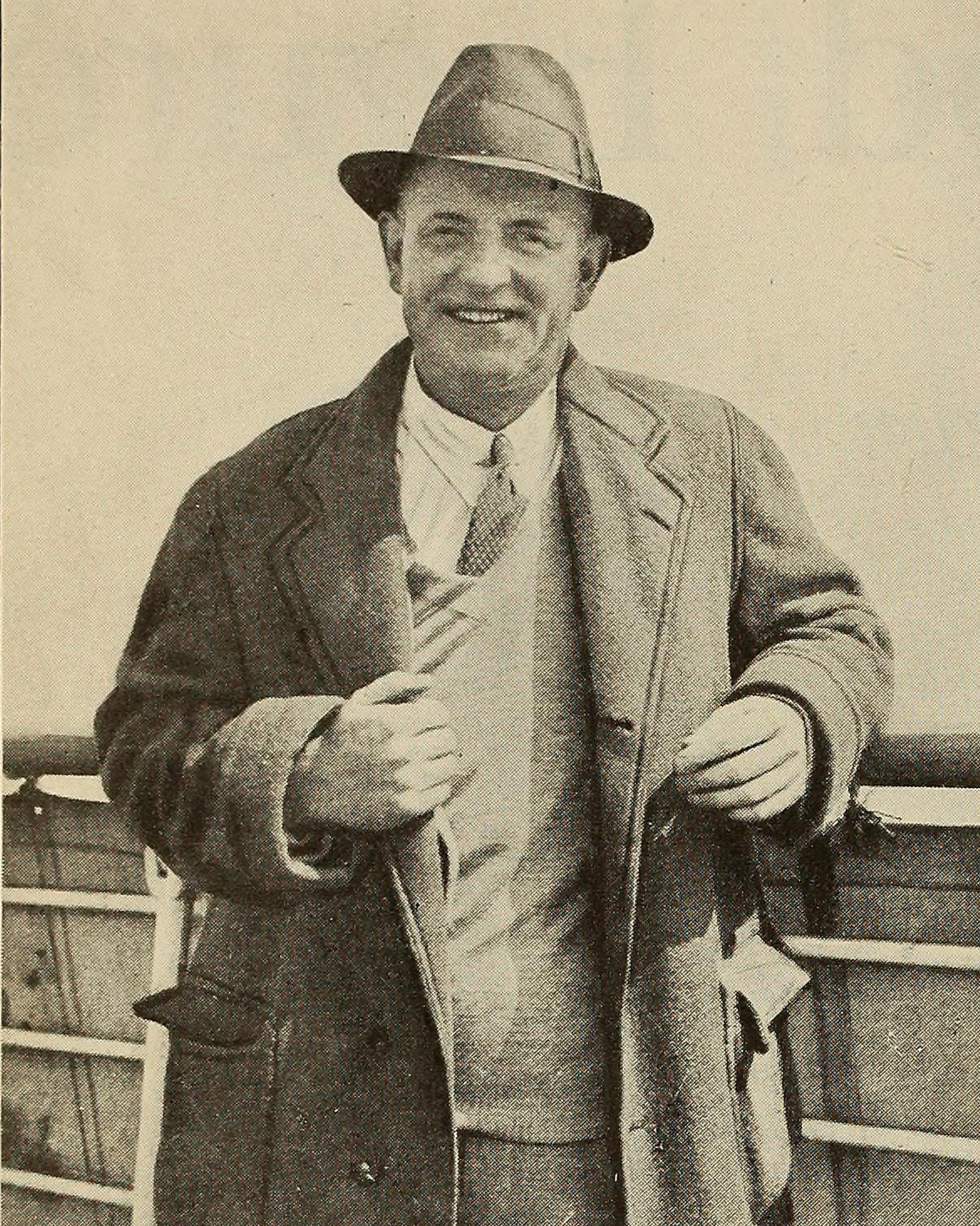
Wodehouse in 1930, aged 48

Cover of Wodehouse's first published novel, 1902

Cover of William Tell Told Again, 1904

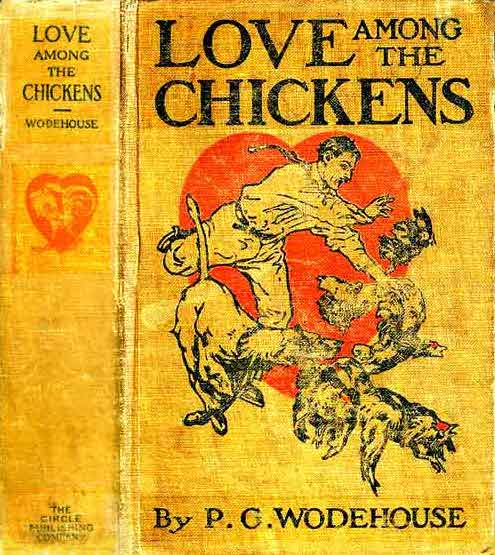
Cover of Love Among the Chickens, 1906

Initially in chronological order by UK publication date, even when the book was published first in the US or serialised in a magazine in advance of publication in book form.

Wodehouse's novels
UK title	Year of UK publication	UK publisher (All publishers based in London)	US title	Year of US publication	US publisher (New York, unless otherwise stated)	Series	Notes
The Pothunters	1902	A & C Black	The Pothunters	1924	Macmillan Publishers	School	–
A Prefect's Uncle	1903	A & C Black	A Prefect's Uncle	1924	Macmillan Publishers	School	–
The Gold Bat	1904	A & C Black	The Gold Bat	1923	Macmillan Publishers	School	–
William Tell Told Again	1904	A & C Black	William Tell Told Again	1904	Macmillan Publishers	–	–
The Head of Kay's	1905	A & C Black	The Head of Kay's	1922	Macmillan Publishers	School	–
Love Among the Chickens	1906	Newnes	Love Among the Chickens	1909	Circle	Ukridge	A rewritten version was published in 1921
The White Feather	1907	A & C Black	The White Feather	1922	Macmillan Publishers	School	–
Not George Washington	1907	Cassell and Co.	Not George Washington	1909	Cassell and Co.	–	Co-authored with Herbert Westbrook; a semi-autobiographical novel
The Swoop!	1909	Alston Rivers	The Swoop! and Other Stories	1979	Seabury Press	–	–
Mike	1909	A & C Black	(See note)	–	–	Psmith and School	Second half published as Enter Psmith in 1935; both parts released in 1953, the first half as Mike at Wrykyn and the second as Mike and Psmith
A Gentleman of Leisure	1910	Alston Rivers	The Intrusion of Jimmy	1910	Watt	–	An earlier version, The Gem Collector, was published in Ainslee's Magazine in December 1909
Psmith in the City	1910	A & C Black	Psmith in the City	1910	Macmillan Publishers	Psmith	–
The Prince and Betty	1912	Mills & Boon	The Prince and Betty	1912	Watt	–	The US edition combines the plot of the UK publication with that of Psmith, Journalist
The Little Nugget	1913	Methuen Publishing	The Little Nugget	1914	Watt	School	–
Psmith, Journalist	1915	A & C Black	Psmith, Journalist	1915	Macmillan Publishers	Psmith and Kid Brady	–
Something Fresh	1915	Methuen Publishing	Something New	1915	D. Appleton & Company	Blandings Castle	–
Uneasy Money	1917	Methuen Publishing	Uneasy Money	1916	D. Appleton & Company	–	–
Piccadilly Jim	1918	Jenkins	Piccadilly Jim	1917	Dodd, Mead and Company	–	–
A Damsel in Distress	1919	Jenkins	A Damsel in Distress	1919	Doran	–	–
The Coming of Bill	1920	Jenkins	Their Mutual Child	1919	Boni & Liveright	–	–
Jill the Reckless	1921	Jenkins	The Little Warrior	1920	Doran	–	–
The Girl on the Boat	1922	Jenkins	Three Men and a Maid	1922	Doran	–	–
The Adventures of Sally	1922	Jenkins	Mostly Sally	1923	Doran	–	–
Leave It to Psmith	1923	Jenkins	Leave It to Psmith	1924	Doran	Psmith and Blandings Castle	–
Bill the Conqueror	1924	Methuen Publishing	Bill the Conqueror	1925	Doran	–	–
Sam the Sudden	1925	Methuen Publishing	Sam in the Suburbs	1925	Doran	–	–
The Small Bachelor	1927	Methuen Publishing	The Small Bachelor	1927	Doran	–	–
Money for Nothing	1928	Jenkins	Money for Nothing	1928	Doubleday, Doran	–	–
Summer Lightning	1929	Jenkins	Fish Preferred	1929	Doubleday, Doran	Blandings Castle	–
Big Money	1931	Jenkins	Big Money	1931	Doubleday, Doran	–	–
If I Were You	1931	Jenkins	If I Were You	1931	Doubleday, Doran	–	–
Doctor Sally	1932	Methuen Publishing	–	–	–	–	–
Hot Water	1932	Jenkins	Hot Water	1932	Doubleday, Doran	–	–
Heavy Weather	1933	Jenkins	Heavy Weather	1933	Little, Brown and Company	Blandings Castle	–
Thank You, Jeeves	1934	Jenkins	Thank You, Jeeves	1934	Little, Brown and Company	Jeeves	–
Right Ho, Jeeves	1934	Jenkins	Brinkley Manor	1934	Little, Brown and Company	Jeeves	–
The Luck of the Bodkins	1935	Jenkins	The Luck of the Bodkins	1936	Little, Brown and Company	–	–
Laughing Gas	1936	Jenkins	Laughing Gas	1936	Doubleday, Doran	–	–
Summer Moonshine	1938	Jenkins	Summer Moonshine	1937	Doubleday, Doran	–	–
The Code of the Woosters	1938	Jenkins	The Code of the Woosters	1938	Doubleday, Doran	Jeeves	–
Uncle Fred in the Springtime	1939	Jenkins	Uncle Fred in the Springtime	1939	Doubleday, Doran	Blandings Castle and Uncle Fred	–
Quick Service	1940	Jenkins	Quick Service	1940	Doubleday, Doran	–	–
Money in the Bank	1946	Jenkins	Money in the Bank	1942	Doubleday, Doran	–	–
Joy in the Morning	1947	Jenkins	Joy in the Morning	1946	Doubleday	Jeeves	This has also been published as Jeeves in the Morning in the US
Full Moon	1947	Jenkins	Full Moon	1947	Doubleday	Blandings Castle	–
Spring Fever	1948	Jenkins	Spring Fever	1948	Doubleday	–	–
Uncle Dynamite	1948	Jenkins	Uncle Dynamite	1948	Didier & Co.	Uncle Fred	–
The Mating Season	1949	Jenkins	The Mating Season	1949	Didier & Co.	Jeeves	–
The Old Reliable	1950	Jenkins	The Old Reliable	1950	Doubleday	–	–
Barmy in Wonderland	1952	Jenkins	Angel Cake	1952	Doubleday	–	–
Pigs Have Wings	1952	Jenkins	Pigs Have Wings	1952	Doubleday	Blandings Castle	–
Ring for Jeeves	1953	Jenkins	The Return of Jeeves	1954	Simon & Schuster	Jeeves	–
Jeeves and the Feudal Spirit	1954	Jenkins	Bertie Wooster Sees It Through	1955	Simon & Schuster	Jeeves	–
French Leave	1956	Jenkins	French Leave	1959	Simon & Schuster	–	–
Something Fishy	1957	Jenkins	The Butler Did It	1957	Simon & Schuster	–	–
Cocktail Time	1958	Jenkins	Cocktail Time	1958	Simon & Schuster	Uncle Fred	–
Jeeves in the Offing	1960	Jenkins	How Right You Are, Jeeves	1960	Simon & Schuster	Jeeves	–
Ice in the Bedroom	1961	Jenkins	The Ice in the Bedroom	1961	Simon & Schuster	–	–
Service with a Smile	1962	Jenkins	Service with a Smile	1961	Simon & Schuster	Blandings Castle and Uncle Fred	–
Stiff Upper Lip, Jeeves	1963	Jenkins	Stiff Upper Lip, Jeeves	1963	Simon & Schuster	Jeeves	–
Frozen Assets	1964	Jenkins	Biffen's Millions	1964	Simon & Schuster	–	–
Galahad at Blandings	1965	Jenkins	The Brinkmanship of Galahad Threepwood	1965	Simon & Schuster	Blandings Castle	–
Company for Henry	1967	Jenkins	The Purloined Paperweight	1967	Simon & Schuster	–	–
Do Butlers Burgle Banks?	1968	Jenkins	Do Butlers Burgle Banks?	1968	Simon & Schuster	–	–
A Pelican at Blandings	1969	Jenkins	No Nudes Is Good Nudes	1970	Simon & Schuster	Blandings Castle	–
The Girl in Blue	1970	Barrie & Jenkins	The Girl in Blue	1971	Simon & Schuster	–	–
Much Obliged, Jeeves	1971	Barrie & Jenkins	Jeeves and the Tie That Binds	1971	Simon & Schuster	Jeeves	–
Pearls, Girls and Monty Bodkin	1972	Barrie & Jenkins	The Plot That Thickened	1973	Simon & Schuster	–	–
Bachelors Anonymous	1973	Barrie & Jenkins	Bachelors Anonymous	1974	Simon & Schuster	–	–
Aunts Aren't Gentlemen	1974	Barrie & Jenkins	The Cat-nappers	1975	Simon & Schuster	Jeeves	–
Sunset at Blandings	1977	Chatto & Windus	Sunset at Blandings	1978	Simon & Schuster	Blandings Castle	Unfinished
The Luck Stone	1997	Galahad Books	–	–	–	–	–

== Short story collections ==
My Man Jeeves, 1920 edition

Psmith, drawn by T.M.R. Whitwell for first edition of Mike, 1909

In chronological order by UK publication date, even when the book was published first in the US or serialised in a magazine in advance of publication in book form.

Wodehouse's short story collections
UK title	Year of UK publication	UK publisher (All publishers based in London)	US title	Year of US publication	US publisher (All publishers based in New York)	Series	Notes
Tales of St. Austin's	1903	A & C Black	Tales of St. Austin's	1923	Macmillan Publishers	School	–
The Man Upstairs	1914	Methuen Publishing	–	–	–	–	–
The Man with Two Left Feet	1917	Methuen Publishing	The Man With Two Left Feet	1933	Doran	Jeeves	–
My Man Jeeves	1919	Newnes	–	–	–	Jeeves	Many rewritten for Carry On, Jeeves
Indiscretions of Archie	1921	Jenkins	Indiscretions of Archie	1921	Doran	–	–
The Clicking of Cuthbert	1922	Jenkins	Golf Without Tears	1924	Doran	Golf	–
The Inimitable Jeeves	1923	Jenkins	Jeeves	1923	Doran	Jeeves	Wodehouse's biographer, Richard Usborne, considers this a "loosely stitched novel of eighteen chapters which make ten separate stories in The Jeeves Omnibus"
Ukridge	1924	Jenkins	He Rather Enjoyed It	1925	Doran	–	–
Carry On, Jeeves	1925	Jenkins	Carry On, Jeeves	1927	Doran	Jeeves	–
The Heart of a Goof	1926	Jenkins	Divots	1927	Doran	Golf	–
Meet Mr Mulliner	1927	Jenkins	Meet Mr Mulliner	1928	Doubleday, Doran	Mr. Mulliner	–
Mr Mulliner Speaking	1929	Jenkins	Mr Mulliner Speaking	1930	Doubleday, Doran	Mr. Mulliner	–
Very Good, Jeeves	1930	Jenkins	Very Good, Jeeves	1930	Doubleday, Doran	Jeeves	–
Mulliner Nights	1933	Jenkins	Mulliner Nights	1933	Doubleday, Doran	Mr. Mulliner	–
Blandings Castle and Elsewhere	1935	Jenkins	Blandings Castle	1935	Doubleday, Doran	Blandings Castle and Mr. Mulliner	–
Young Men in Spats	1936	Jenkins	Young Men in Spats	1936	Doubleday, Doran	–	–
Lord Emsworth and Others	1937	Jenkins	Crime Wave at Blandings	1937	Doubleday, Doran	Blandings Castle, Golf, Ukridge	–
Eggs, Beans and Crumpets	1940	Jenkins	Eggs, Beans and Crumpets	1940	Doubleday, Doran	–	–
Nothing Serious	1950	Jenkins	Nothing Serious	1950	Doubleday, Doran	Blandings Castle, Golf, Ukridge	–
A Few Quick Ones	1959	Jenkins	A Few Quick Ones	1959	Simon & Schuster	Jeeves, Ukridge, Mr. Mulliner	–
Plum Pie	1966	Jenkins	Plum Pie	1967	Simon & Schuster	Jeeves, Blandings, Ukridge, Mr. Mulliner	Short stories, poems, essay
–	–	–	The Uncollected Wodehouse	1976	Seabury Press	–	–
A Man of Means	1991	Porpoise Books	–	–	–	–	–
Plum Stones	1993	Galahad Books	–	–	–	–	–
Tales of Wrykyn and Elsewhere	1997	Porpoise Books	–	–	–	School	–
–	–	–	Enter Jeeves	1997	Dover Publications	Jeeves, Reggie Pepper	Early Jeeves stories and all Reggie Pepper stories
Kid Brady Stories and A Man of Means	2013	Everyman Books	Kid Brady Stories and A Man of Means	2013	The Overlook Press	Kid Brady	–

=== Individual short stories ===
Wodehouse wrote more than 300 short stories. Many of these stories were originally published in magazines and subsequently published in short story collections. Wodehouse also contributed other works to periodicals such as articles and poems, and some of Wodehouse's novels were originally serialised in magazines as well.

== Plays ==
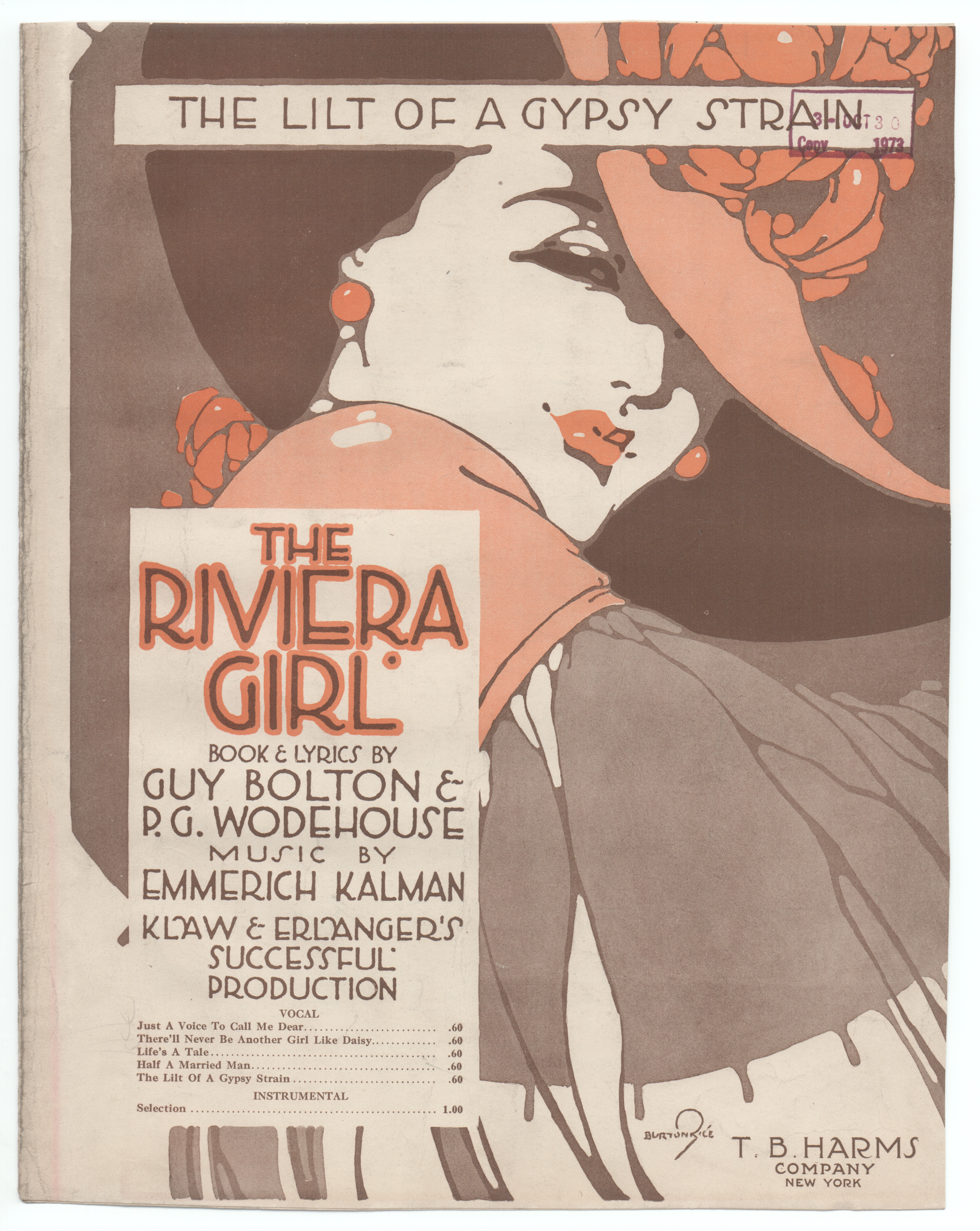
Cover of sheet music of "The Lilt of a Gypsy Strain" from The Riviera Girl, 1917

Tom Powers and Beatrice Lillie in the London production of the Bolton, Wodehouse and Kern show Oh, Boy!, 1919

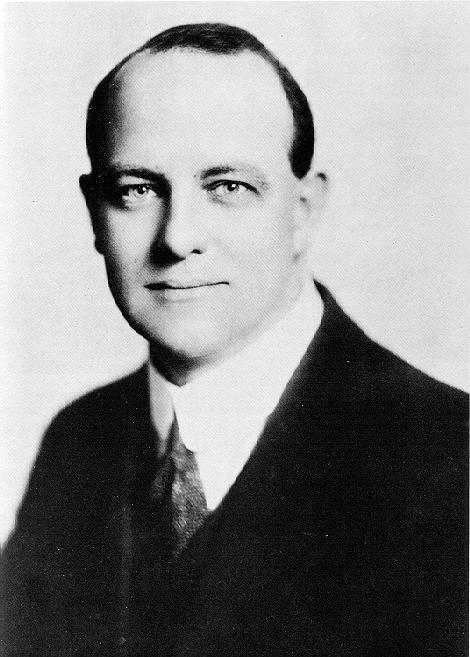
Wodehouse in 1904, aged 23

Plays by Wodehouse
Title	Location of first performance	Date of first performance	Year of publication	Publisher (All publishers based in London)	Notes
After the Show	Unknown	1911	–	–	By Wodehouse and Herbert Westbrook
A Gentleman of Leisure	Playhouse Theatre, New York	24 August 1911	–	–	By Wodehouse and John Stapleton; adaptation of Wodehouse's novel A Gentleman of Leisure
A Thief for the Night	McVicker's Theater, Chicago	13 March 1913	–	–	By Wodehouse and John Stapleton; revival of A Gentleman of Leisure
Brother Alfred	Savoy Theatre, London	8 April 1913	–	–	By Wodehouse and Herbert Westbrook; adaptation of Wodehouse's short story "Rallying Round Old George"
Nuts and Wine	Empire Theatre, London	4 January 1914	–	–	By Wodehouse and C.H. Bovill
Have a Heart	Liberty Theatre, New York	11 January 1917	1913	New York: T.B. Harms	By Wodehouse and Guy Bolton; music by Jerome Kern
Oh Boy!	Princess Theatre, New York	20 February 1917	1917	New York: T.B. Harms	By Wodehouse and Guy Bolton; revised for the UK as Oh Joy!
Leave It to Jane	Longacre Theatre, New York	28 August 1917	1917	New York: T.B. Harms	By Wodehouse and Guy Bolton; music by Jerome Kern
Kitty Darlin'	Teck Theatre, Buffalo, New York	19 September 1917	1918	New York and Boston: G. Schirmer	By Wodehouse and Guy Bolton
The Riviera Girl	New Amsterdam Theatre, New York	24 September 1917	1917	New York: T.B. Harms	By Wodehouse and Guy Bolton
Miss 1917	Century Theatre, New York	5 November 1917	1917	New York: T.B. Harms	By Wodehouse and Guy Bolton
Oh, Lady! Lady!!	Princess Theatre, New York	1 February 1918	1918	New York: T.B. Harms	By Wodehouse and Guy Bolton; music by Jerome Kern
See You Later	Academy of music, Baltimore, Maryland	15 April 1918	1918	New York: T.B. Harms	By Wodehouse and Guy Bolton
The Girl Behind the Gun	New Amsterdam Theatre, New York	16 September 1918	1918	New York and London: Chappell & Co	By Wodehouse and Guy Bolton; revised for the UK as Kissing Time
The Canary	Globe Theatre, New York	4 November 1918	–	–	By Wodehouse and Guy Bolton
Oh, My Dear!	Princess Theatre, New York	27 November 1918	1918	New York: T.B. Harms	By Wodehouse and Guy Bolton
The Rose of China	Lyric Theatre New York	25 November 1919	1919	New York: T.B. Harms	By Wodehouse and Guy Bolton
Sally	New Amsterdam Theatre, New York	21 December 1920	1920	New York: T.B. Harms	By Wodehouse, Guy Bolton, Clifford Grey, Buddy De Sylva and Anne Caldwell; music by Jerome Kern
The Golden Moth	Adelphi Theatre, London	5 October 1921	1921	London : Ascherberg, Hopwood & Crew	By Wodehouse and Fred Thompson
The Cabaret Girl	Winter Garden Theatre, London	19 September 1922	1922	London and Sydney: Chappell; New York: T.B. Harms	By Wodehouse and George Grossmith; music by Jerome Kern
The Beauty Prize	Winter Garden Theatre, London	5 September 1923	1923	London and Sydney: Chappell; New York: T.B. Harms	By Wodehouse and George Grossmith; music by Jerome Kern
Sitting Pretty	Fulton Theatre, New York	8 April 1924	1925	New York: T.B. Harms	By Wodehouse and Guy Bolton; music by Jerome Kern
Hearts and Diamonds	Strand Theatre	1 June 1926	1926	London: Prowse	By Wodehouse and Laurie Wylie; adaptation of The Orlov by Biuno Granichstaedten and Ernst Marischka
The Play's the Thing	Henry Miller's Theatre, New York	3 November 1926	1927	New York: Brentano's	Adaptation of a play by Ferenc Molnár
Oh, Kay!	Imperial Theatre, New York	8 November 1926	1926	London and Sydney: Chappell; New York: T.B. Harms	By Wodehouse and Guy Bolton; music by George Gershwin, lyrics by Ira Gershwin
Her Cardboard Lover	Empire Theatre, New York	21 March 1927	–	–	By Wodehouse and Valerie Wyngate; music by George Gershwin, lyrics by Ira Gershwin; based on Dans sa candeur naïve by Jacques Deval
Good Morning, Bill	Duke of York's Theatre, London	28 November 1927	1928	London: Methuen	Adapted from a play by Ladislaus Fodor
The Three Musketeers	Lyric Theatre, New York	13 March 1928	1937	London: Chappell	By Wodehouse and Clifford Grey; adaptation of The Three Musketeers by Alexandre Dumas
A Damsel in Distress	New Theatre, London	13 August 1928	1930	London: Samuel French	By Wodehouse and Ian Hay; adaptation of Wodehouse's novel A Damsel in Distress
Baa, Baa, Black Sheep	New Theatre, London	22 April 1929	1930	London: Samuel French	By Wodehouse and Ian Hay
Candle-light	Empire Theatre, New York	30 September 1929	1934	London and New York: Samuel French	Adapted from a play by Siegfried Geyer
Leave It to Psmith	Shaftesbury Theatre, London	30 September 1930	1931	London: Samuel French	By Wodehouse and Ian Hay; adaptation of Wodehouse's novel Leave It to Psmith
Who's Who	Duke of York's Theatre, London	20 September 1934	–	–	By Wodehouse and Guy Bolton; adaptation of Wodehouse's novel If I Were You
Anything Goes	Alvin Theatre	21 November 1934	1936	New York: Samuel French	By Wodehouse, Guy Bolton, Howard Lindsay and Russel Crouse; lyrics and music by Cole Porter
The Inside Stand	Saville Theatre, London	21 November 1935	–	–	By Wodehouse and Guy Bolton; adaptation of Wodehouse's novel Hot Water
Arthur	–	–	–	–	Adapted in 1947 from Jemand by Ferenc Molnár; not produced
Game of Hearts	–	–	–	–	Adapted in 1947 from a play by Ferenc Molnár; not produced
Don't Listen, Ladies	St James's Theatre, London	2 September 1948	–	–	By Wodehouse (as Stephen Powys) and Guy Bolton; adapted from a play by Sacha Guitry
Nothing Serious	–	1950	–	–	No major productions, but produced in the provinces by touring companies
Phipps	–	–	–	–	By Wodehouse and Guy Bolton in 1951; not produced
Come On, Jeeves	–	–	1956	London: Evans	By Wodehouse and Guy Bolton; no major productions, but produced in the provinces by touring companies
Oh, Clarence!	Opera House, Manchester; later Lyric Theatre, London and on tour	29 July 1968	1969	London: English Theatre Guild	Adapted by John Chapman from Blandings Castle stories

== Films ==
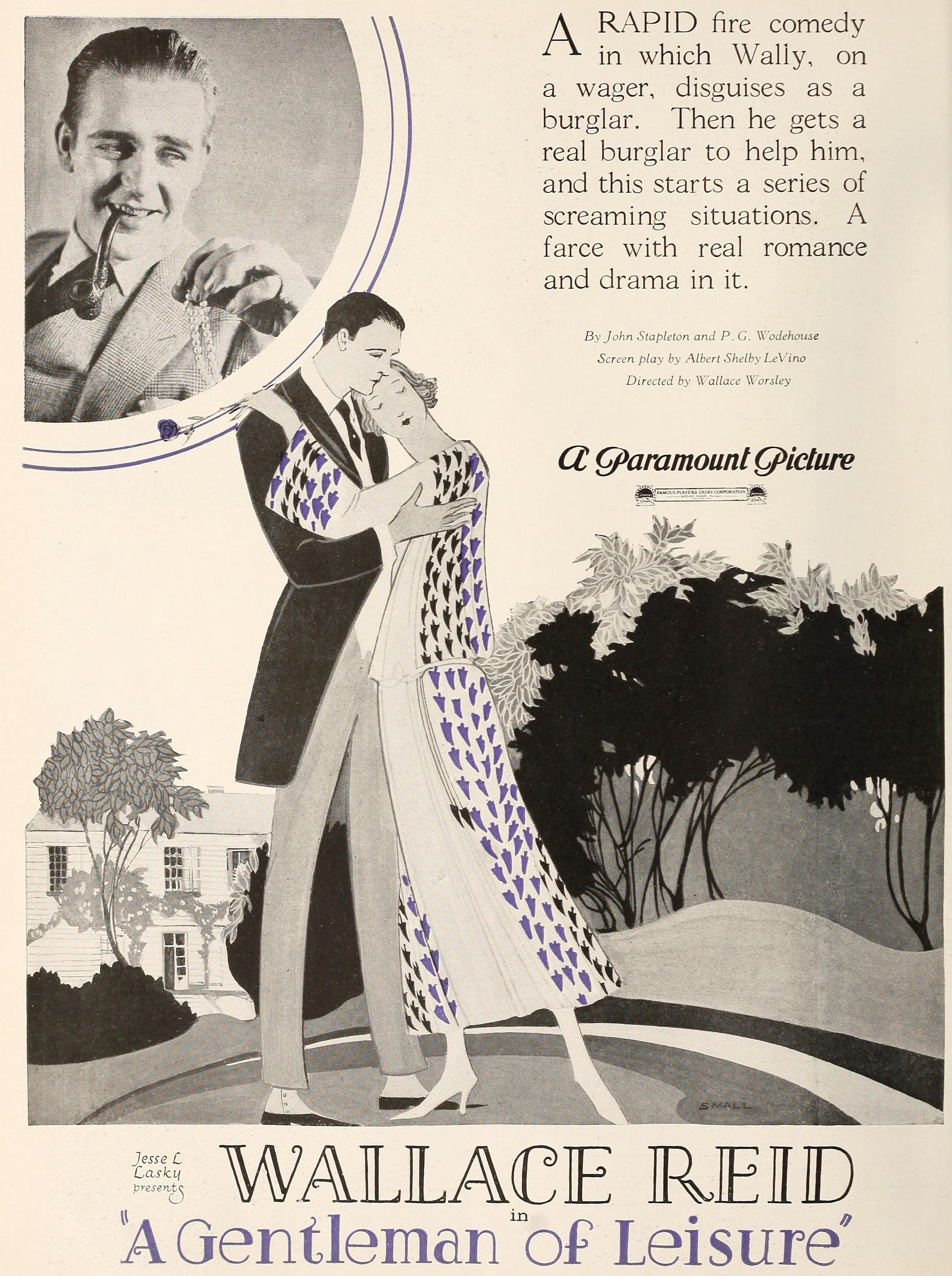
Advertisement for A Gentleman of Leisure (1923)

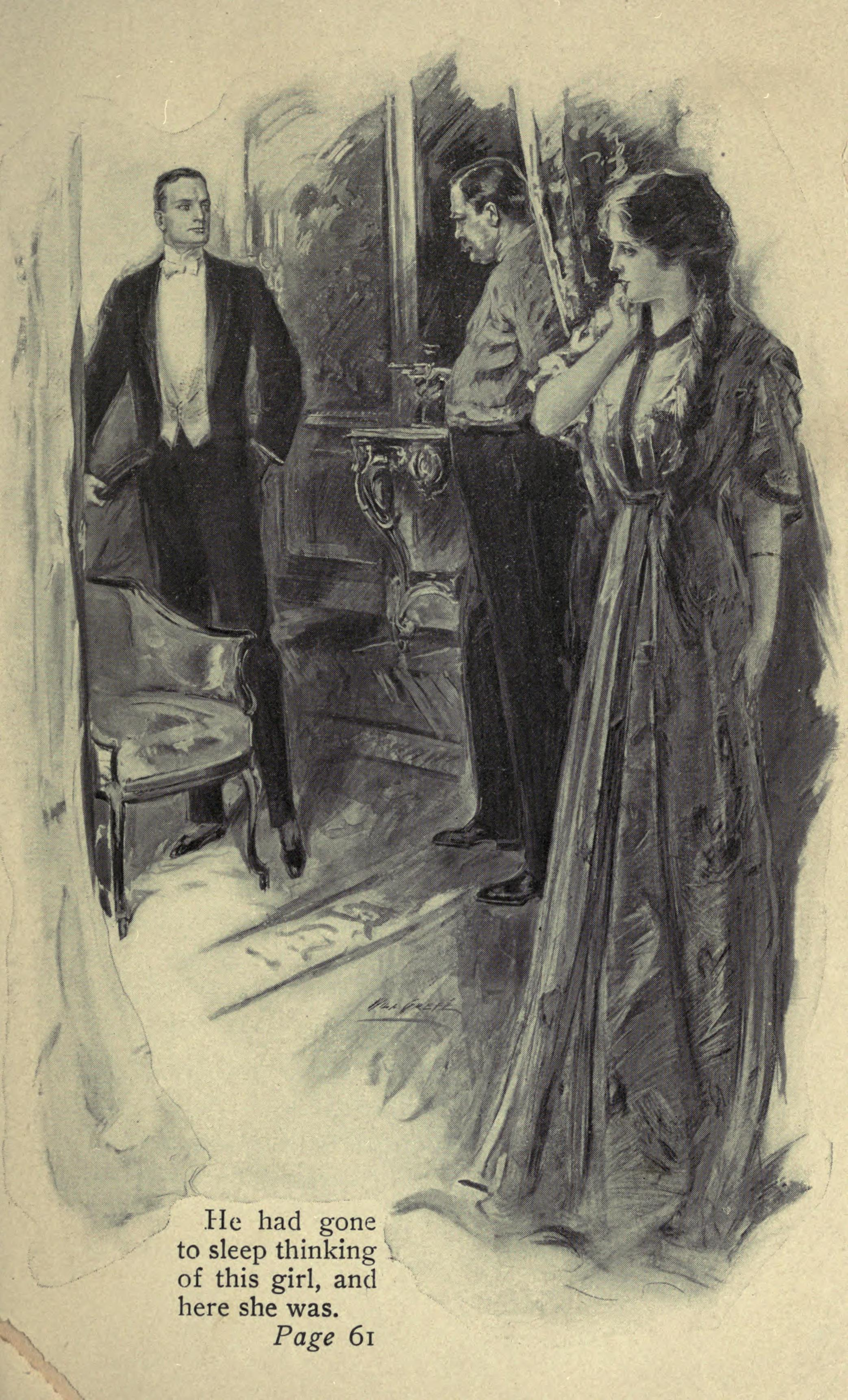
Illustration from the 1910 novel A Gentleman of Leisure

Films written in whole or part by Wodehouse
Title	Year of release	Studio	Notes
A Gentleman of Leisure	1915	Jesse L. Lasky Feature Play Co.	Based on the play A Gentleman of Leisure by John Stapleton and Wodehouse
A Damsel in Distress	1919	Albert Capellani Productions	Based on Wodehouse's 1919 novel A Damsel in Distress
Piccadilly Jim	1919	Selznick Pictures	Based on Wodehouse's 1917 novel Piccadilly Jim
The Prince and Betty	1919	Jesse D. Hampton Productions	Based on Wodehouse's 1912 novel The Prince and Betty
Oh, Lady, Lady	1920	Realart Pictures	Based on the play Oh, Lady! Lady!! by Guy Bolton, Jerome Kern and Wodehouse
A Gentleman of Leisure	1923	Paramount Pictures	Based on the play A Gentleman of Leisure by John Stapleton and Wodehouse
The Golden Butterfly	1926	Sascha-Film / Phoebus Film	German-Danish-Austrian film. Based on the short story "The Making of Mac's" from The Man with Two Left Feet
Oh, Kay!	1928	First National Pictures	Based on Wodehouse's 1926 play Oh, Kay!
Those Three French Girls	1930	Cosmopolitan Productions	Dialogue by Wodehouse
The Man in Possession	1931	Metro-Goldwyn-Mayer	Additional dialogue by Wodehouse
Brother Alfred	1932	British International Pictures	Based on the play Brother Alfred by Herbert Westbrook and Wodehouse
Leave It to Me	1933	British International Pictures	Based on Wodehouse's 1923 novel Leave It to Psmith
Summer Lightning	1933	British and Dominions Film Corporation	Based on Wodehouse's 1929 novel Summer Lightning
Anything Goes	1936	Paramount Pictures	Based on the play Anything Goes by Guy Bolton, Cole Porter and Wodehouse
Piccadilly Jim	1936	Metro-Goldwyn-Mayer	Based on Wodehouse's 1917 novel Piccadilly Jim
Thank You, Jeeves!	1936	20th Century Fox	Based on Wodehouse's 1934 novel Thank You, Jeeves
Step Lively, Jeeves	1937	20th Century Fox	Based on characters created by Wodehouse
A Damsel in Distress	1937	RKO Pictures	Screenwriter; Based on his 1919 novel A Damsel in Distress
Rosalie	1937	Metro-Goldwyn-Mayer	Based on the 1928 musical play Rosalie by George Gershwin, Sigmund Romberg, Ira Gershwin and Wodehouse
Thunder and Lightning	1938	Svensk Filmindustri	Swedish film. Based on Wodehouse's 1929 novel Summer Lightning
Anything Goes	1956	Paramount Pictures	Based on the play Anything Goes by Guy Bolton, Cole Porter and Wodehouse
The Girl on the Boat	1961	Knightsbridge Films	Based on Wodehouse's 1921 novel The Girl on the Boat
Piccadilly Jim	2004	Myriad Pictures	Based on Wodehouse's 1917 novel Piccadilly Jim

== Autobiographies and miscellany ==
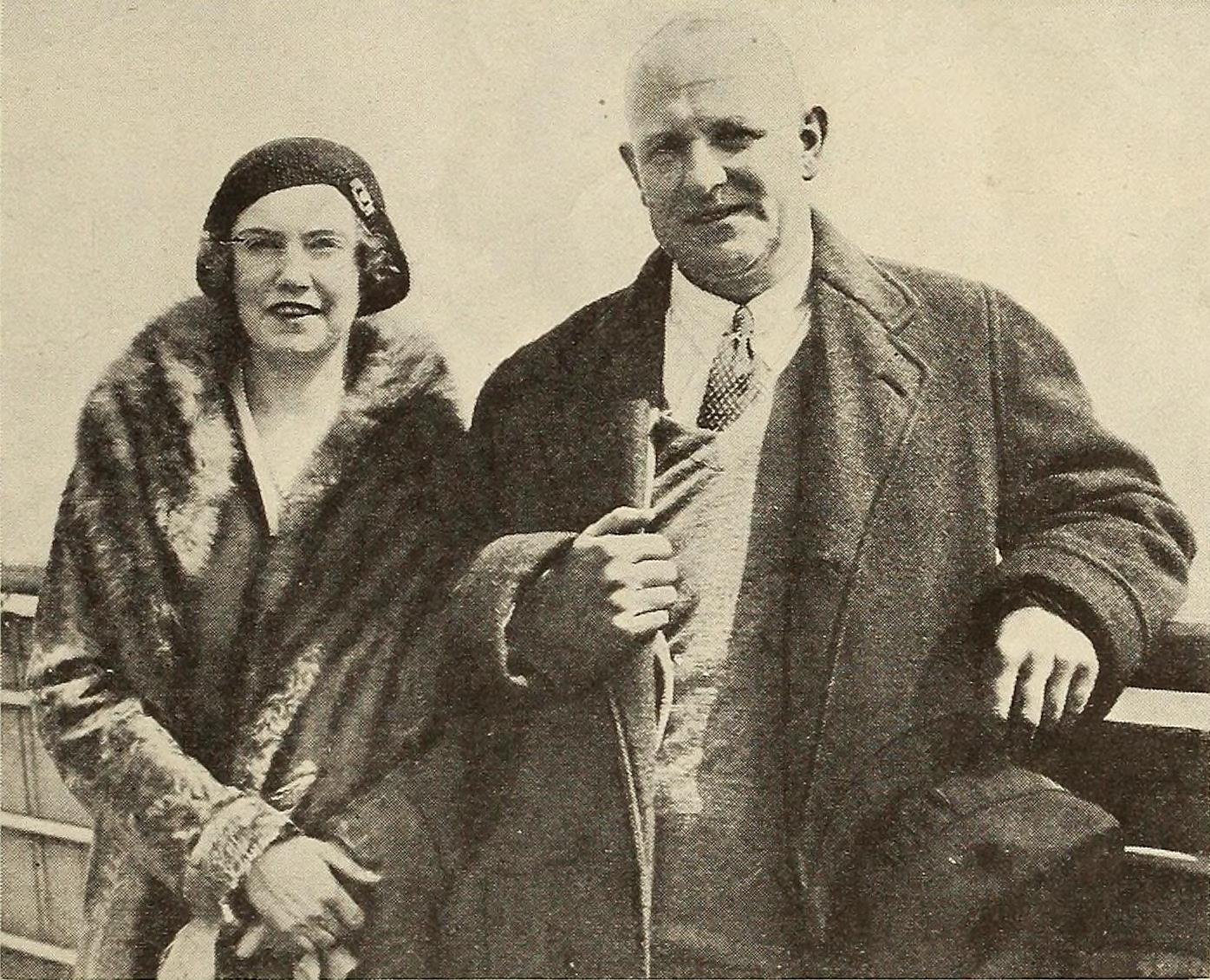
Wodehouse with his adopted daughter Leonora, 1930

The following is a collection of published autobiographical and miscellaneous work. There are transcripts available of the five broadcasts he made, available online, including through the PG Wodehouse Society (UK).

Wodehouse's autobiographical works
UK title	Year of UK publication	UK publisher (All publishers based in London)	US title	Year of US publication	US publisher (All publishers based in New York)	Notes
The Globe By the Way Book	1908	Globe Publishing	–	–	–	With Herbert Westbrook; collected journalism
Louder and Funnier	1932	Faber and Faber	–	–	–	Articles written for Vanity Fair
Bring on the Girls!	1954	Jenkins	Bring on the Girls!	1953	Simon & Schuster	Semi-autobiographical stories, in collaboration with Guy Bolton
Performing Flea	1953	Jenkins	Author! Author!	1962	Simon & Schuster	A collection of letters, with notes
Over Seventy	1957	Jenkins	America, I Like You	1956	Simon & Schuster	–
The Parrot and Other Poems	1990	Hutchinson	–	–	–	Poems
Yours, Plum: the letters of P. G. Wodehouse	1988	Hutchinson	–	–	–	Correspondence; edited by Frances Donaldson
A Life in Letters	2011	Hutchinson	A Life in Letters	2013	W. W. Norton & Company	Correspondence; edited by Sophie Ratcliffe

== References and sources ==
=== Sources ===
- Boothroyd, Basil (11 September 1968). "Theatre". Punch.
- Connolly, Joseph (1987) [1979]. P. G. Wodehouse. London: Thames and Hudson. ISBN 978-0-5002-6027-2.
- Jasen, David A. (1975). P. G. Wodehouse: A Portrait of a Master. London: Garnstone. ISBN 978-0-85511-190-8.
- Jasen, David A.; Wodehouse, P.G. (1983). Four Plays. London: Methuen. ISBN 978-0-4135-3030-1.
- McIlvaine, Eileen; Sherby, Louise S; Heineman, James H (1990). P. G. Wodehouse: A Comprehensive Bibliography and Checklist. New York: Heineman. ISBN 978-0-87008-125-5.
- Phelps, Barry (1992). P. G. Wodehouse: Man and Myth. London: Constable. ISBN 978-0-09-471620-9.
- Powell, Anthony (1994). Under Review: Further Writings on Writers, 1946-1990. University of Chicago Press. ISBN 978-0-226-67712-5.
- Ring, Tony (August 2001). "P. G. Wodehouse: Storyteller". The Book and Magazine Collector (209). Diamond Publishing Group.
- Ring, Tony (November 2004). "World of Wodehouse". The Book and Magazine Collector (248). Diamond Publishing Group.
- Rogers, John H. (1996). "P. G. Wodehouse". In Rogers, John H. (ed.). Dictionary of Literary Biography: British Short-Fiction Writers, 1915–1945. Detroit: Gale. ISBN 978-0-8103-9357-8.
- Sproat, Ian (2004). "Wodehouse, Sir Pelham Grenville (1881–1975)". Oxford Dictionary of National Biography (online ed.). Oxford University Press. doi:10.1093/ref:odnb/31851. (Subscription, Wikipedia Library access or UK public library membership required.)
- Stempel, Larry. "Wodehouse, P.G.". Oxford Music Online. Oxford University Press.
- Usborne, Richard (1976). Wodehouse at Work to the End. London: Barrie and Jenkins. ISBN 978-0-214-20211-7.
- Voorhees, Richard J. (1985). "P. G. Wodehouse". In Stayley, Thomas F. (ed.). Dictionary of Literary Biography: British Novelists, 1890–1929: Traditionalists. Detroit: Gale. ISBN 978-0-8103-1712-3.
- White, Laura M. (2009). "P. G. Wodehouse". In St. Pierre, Paul Matthew (ed.). Dictionary of Literary Biography: Twentieth-Century British Humorists. Detroit: Gale. ISBN 978-0-7876-8170-8.
