= Bachelors Anonymous =

1973 novel by P. G. Wodehouse

- First edition
- Author: P. G. Wodehouse
- Language: English
- Genre: Comic novel
- Publisher: Barrie & Jenkins (UK); Simon & Schuster, Inc. (US)
- Publication date: 15 October 1973 (UK); 28 August 1974 (US)
- Publication place: United Kingdom
- Media type: Print (Hardcover)
- Pages: 191 pp
- ISBN: 0-214-66889-4
- OCLC: 764103
- Dewey Decimal: 823/.9/12
- LC Class: PZ3.W817 Bac PR6045.O53

Bachelors Anonymous is a novel by P. G. Wodehouse, first published in the United Kingdom on 15 October 1973 (Wodehouse's 92nd birthday) by Barrie & Jenkins, London and in the United States on 28 August 1974 by Simon & Schuster, Inc., New York.

In the novel, movie mogul Ivor Llewellyn, who has divorced five times, is interested to learn from his lawyer Ephraim Trout about a support group for bachelors who help keep each other from making impulsive marriage proposals.

Ivor Llewellyn previously appeared in The Luck of the Bodkins (1935), Frozen Assets (1964), and Pearls, Girls and Monty Bodkin (1972). Another character, lawyer Jerry Nichols, appeared in Uneasy Money (1916).

Bachelors Anonymous was the second last novel completed by Wodehouse, with the last being Aunts Aren't Gentlemen.

== Plot ==
Ephraim Trout of Trout, Wapshott and Edelstein, a legal firm employed by Ivor Llewellyn, head of the Superba-Llewellyn studio of Hollywood, has handled Llewellyn's five divorces. Llewellyn is on his way to London on business, and Trout sees Llewellyn off at the Los Angeles airport. Trout warns him against any more impulsive proposals. Trout has managed to stay single since he belongs to a California group called Bachelors Anonymous, inspired by Alcoholics Anonymous. When one member feels the impulse to take a woman out to dinner, he seeks out the other members and they reason with him. He advises Llewellyn to consult the legal firm of Nichols, Erridge and Trubshaw in London, as they can find someone to act as a similar advisor for Llewellyn. Other members of Bachelors Anonymous convince Trout to follow Llewellyn to London to help. In London, Llewellyn meets Vera Dalrymple, the star of the Regal Theatre's stage comedy Cousin Angela, written by Joseph "Joe" Pickering (who makes his living working for the solicitors Shoesmith, Shoesmith, Shoesmith, and Shoesmith, mentioned in other stories such as Ice in the Bedroom). Joe is interviewed by Sally Fitch (from Much Middlefold) for a women's paper, and they get along well.

Vera monopolizes the show and Cousin Angela closes after only 16 performances. The Regal Theatre's stage-doorkeeper Mac (who appeared in A Damsel in Distress and Summer Lightning) gives his sympathy to Joe. While waiting to see Vera, a drunk man threatens Mac, so Joe throws him out. Joe learns from his friend Jerry Nichols, of the Nichols, Erridge and Trubshaw law firm, that he can earn a lucrative salary working for Llewellyn. Joe falls in love with Sally and makes plans to have lunch with her at Barribault's. Jerry tells Sally that she has inherited a legacy from a former employer, Letitia Carberry, supporter of the Anti-Tobacco League. Carberry left most of her money to the League but left Sally twenty-five thousand pounds on the condition that she not smoke for two years. Sally is to live in a posh Park Lane apartment with a private detective, Daphne Dolby, the owner of the Eagle Eye detective agency, who will know if Sally smokes. Daphne is engaged to Sir Jaklyn Warner, Baronet, because she is interested in his title and he in her money. Jaklyn, who is Sally's ex-fiancé, hears about Sally's inheritance. Sally accidentally falls asleep and misses lunch with Joe.

Llewellyn explains the Bachelors Anonymous idea to Joe, and recognizes him as the man who threw him out at the theatre and kept him from having dinner with Vera. Impressed, Llewellyn hires him. Sally apologizes to Joe for missing lunch and agrees to dinner. Trout sees Llewellyn, who is concerned that Joe has fallen for Sally. This worries Trout, and to keep Joe from going to dinner, he slips Joe a Mickey Finn. Sally is disappointed when Joe fails to appear, believing it to be petty revenge for her missing lunch. Jaklyn proposes to her (for her money) and she accepts, not knowing he is engaged to Daphne. She mentions her engagement to Daphne, and Daphne realizes what occurred. With one of her operatives, the intimidating Cyril Pemberton, she makes Jaklyn join her at the registry office to get married.

Sally refuses to listen to Joe and goes to Valley Fields to see her former nanny Jane Priestley, who turns Joe and Trout away. Trout's hand is bitten by a dog named Percy, and the dog's owner, Amelia Bingham, bandages his hand. She is a hospital nurse. Trout falls for her, and now approves of marriage. Llewellyn is astonished when Trout accepts dinner with Vera on Llewellyn's behalf. Joe suggests that Llewellyn get a check-up at a hospital to hide from Vera. Trout, who has resigned from Bachelors Anonymous, admits to slipping Joe a Mickey Finn and apologizes to him. Trout tells Sally everything, and she reconciles with Joe. Unaware that Jaklyn is now married, Trout pays him off with fifty pounds to prevent a breach of promise case. Daphne catches Sally smoking, and Joe is fired by Llewellyn, who impulsively proposed to his nurse at the hospital, Amelia. However, all ends well when Llewellyn learns Trout has got engaged to Amelia. Llewellyn decides to make Joe's play into a movie and pays him two hundred and fifty thousand dollars, and will become a member of Bachelors Anonymous when he returns to California with a letter of introduction from Trout.

== Publication history ==
The illustration on the first UK edition dust jacket of Amelia Bingham bandaging Ephraim Trout's hand was drawn by Osbert Lancaster. The back of the dust jacket features a photograph of Wodehouse looking out a window, taken by Tom Blau, Camera Press. The same illustration and photograph were used for the first US edition for the front and back of the dust jacket respectively.

The US edition of the book is dedicated: "To Peter Schwed, as always". Peter Schwed was Wodehouse's editor at Simon & Schuster. Wodehouse had also dedicated the US editions of Bertie Wooster Sees It Through, Author! Author!, and The Purloined Paperweight to Schwed.

== Reception ==
Wodehouse biographer Richard Usborne called the book "a most benign, autumnal novel, formulaic but much simpler in plot than Wodehouse in his long summer would have thought fair to his cash customers."
