= Frozen Assets (novel) =

1964 novel by P. G. Wodehouse

- First UK edition
- Author: P. G. Wodehouse
- Language: English
- Genre: Comic novel
- Publisher: Simon & Schuster, Inc. (US); Herbert Jenkins (UK)
- Publication date: 14 July 1964 (US); 14 August 1964 (UK)
- Publication place: United States
- Media type: Print
- ISBN: 978-1-84159-165-0
- OCLC: 403466603

Frozen Assets is a novel by P. G. Wodehouse, first published in the United States on 14 July 1964 by Simon & Schuster, Inc., New York under the title Biffen's Millions, and in the United Kingdom on 14 August 1964 by Herbert Jenkins, London.

Set in the publishing world, Frozen Assets is a romantic comedy revolving around English editor Jerry Shoesmith, who falls in love with American journalist Kay Christopher and must keep his friend, Kay's irresponsible brother Biff, out of trouble.

The story features the recurring Wodehouse characters publishing magnate Lord Tilbury and his devious lackey Percy Pilbeam. Minor characters include movie mogul Ivor Llewellyn, who appears in two Monty Bodkin novels as well as Bachelors Anonymous, and the solicitor John Shoesmith, from Money in the Bank and Ice in the Bedroom. Tilbury's niece Linda Rome works for Leonard Gish of Something Fishy.

== Plot ==
On the last day of his Paris holiday, Gerald "Jerry" Shoesmith, editor of Society Spice, loses his wallet, which contains his keys. It is brought to an overly bureaucratic police sergeant, who will not return it for three days. American journalist Katherine "Kay" Christopher suggests he sleep at Henry Blake-Somerset's apartment, though Henry is cold and aloof. It is revealed that Henry is Kay's fiancé. Jerry tells Kay that he wants to marry her, but she remains with Henry. Kay's brother and Jerry's friend, Edmund Biffen "Biff" Christopher, is prone to drinking and getting into fights while drunk. He has fled Paris for London after punching a policeman. At Barribault's Hotel, Biff is served by waiter William "Willie" Pilbeam, whose son Percy runs a private detective agency, and whose niece Gwendoline Gibbs is secretary to Jerry's formidable employer Lord Tilbury. Biff discovers he has inherited millions from his godfather, Edmund Biffen Pyke, but on conditions that will be explained in a coming letter. In the meantime, Biff is low on funds and moves into Jerry's modest flat in Halsey Court. Once engaged to Tilbury's niece Linda Rome, Biff hopes to win her back. Tilbury was the late Pyke's brother and wants Biff's inheritance. Tilbury also loves Gwendoline.

Biff is struck by Gwendoline's beauty and joins Gwendoline and Percy for dinner. Biff gets drunk and plans to punch a policeman with a ginger moustache, so Jerry locks Biff in his room. The next day, Biff is grateful; he has learned his money is in a spendthrift trust and will not be given to him until he turns thirty, and he will get nothing if he is arrested before then. Biff's thirtieth birthday is in a week. Jerry hates editing a gossip paper, so Biff says that when he is rich, he will buy the intellectual Thursday Review and make Jerry editor. Coincidentally, Tilbury fires Jerry. Jerry briefly returns to Paris to retrieve his wallet and asks Kay to help watch over Biff. Biff reconciles with Linda and wants to reform for her. Tilbury hires Percy to get Biff arrested. Biff gives Gwendoline lunch to be polite. Percy wants to hire Biff to drink with a Russian spy called Joe Murphy (who is actually just a freelance journalist and heavy drinker). Biff declines, but changes his mind when Linda ends their engagement since she saw him with Gwendoline (though Percy later refuses to pay Biff). Percy informs Gwendoline about everything to warn her that Biff will not be rich. Kay comes to London, and she and Jerry see Biff return to the flat drunk and with a black eye. Jerry decides to steal Biff's trousers to keep him from going out and leave all their spare trousers with his uncle John Shoesmith. Henry suspects Kay loves Jerry.

Tilbury goes to Jerry's flat in the morning and tells Biff, who is in sleepwear, to split the money evenly, or else he will argue in court that the late Pyke was mentally incompetent to make a will. Tilbury leaves, and Jerry advises Biff not to agree. Jerry leaves after Biff realizes his trousers are gone. Tilbury returns, and Biff, desperate to see Linda, threatens him into giving him his trousers. Tilbury telephones Percy to bring him trousers, but Percy misunderstands and brings Gwendoline's dog Towser. Tilbury gives Percy his house key to fetch a pair of trousers, but Percy is offended by Tilbury's insults and instead sells his own trousers to Tilbury for a high price. Tilbury soon stops the cheque. Realising he has forgotten lunch with Ivor Llewellyn, who pays a lot to advertise in Tilbury's papers, Tilbury telephones Gwendoline. She told Llewellyn that Tilbury was at home due to illness, and suggests that Tilbury hurry home, since Llewellyn intends to visit. Tilbury thanks her and brings his solicitor, Cyril Bunting, to pose as the butler, since the staff resigned over Tilbury's bad temper.

Henry looks for Jerry, and Percy threatens him into giving him his trousers. Jerry and Kay approach the flat and Henry hides in a bedroom. He overhears Kay confess her love for Jerry. After Kay leaves, a boy employed by Percy delivers a pair of trousers, which Henry puts on before coldly exiting. Linda has married Biff. Biff does not remember how he got his black eye and thinks the police might be looking for him, so Linda hid him at Tilbury's house, since she thought it was unoccupied. At Tilbury's house, Biff threatens to tell Llewellyn about Tilbury's deception unless Tilbury takes only five percent of the inheritance. Tilbury grudgingly agrees. Percy comes because of the stopped cheque but gets locked in the cellar and arrested. Bunting warns that Percy can sue Tilbury. However, Gwendoline blackmails Percy out of it, and she gets engaged to Tilbury. The police are looking for Biff, but it turns out that the ginger-moustached policeman wants to thank Biff, who saved him in a brawl.

== Publication history ==
The story was published in two parts in Playboy in February and March 1964, under the title Biffen's Millions. It was illustrated by Bill Charmatz. This serial was shortened from the book version.

The dust jacket of the first US edition was illustrated by John Alcorn. The first UK edition dust wrapper was illustrated by Payne.
