= Something Fishy =

1957 novel by P. G. Wodehouse

- First edition (UK)
- Author: P. G. Wodehouse
- Language: English
- Genre: Comic novel
- Publisher: Herbert Jenkins (UK); Simon & Schuster, Inc. (US)
- Publication date: 18 January 1957 (UK); 28 January 1957 (US)
- Publication place: United Kingdom
- Media type: Print

Something Fishy is a novel by P. G. Wodehouse, first published in the United Kingdom on 18 January 1957 by Herbert Jenkins, London and in the United States on 28 January 1957 by Simon & Schuster, Inc., New York, under the title The Butler Did It.

The plot concerns a tontine formed by a group of wealthy men weeks before the 1929 stock market crash, and a butler named Keggs who, having overheard the planning of the scheme, years later decides to try to make money out of his knowledge. The novel features Bill Hollister and Roscoe Bunyan, the sons of two of the men who set up the tontine. The last one to become married will receive one million dollars from the tontine. Keggs supports his impoverished former employer, the genial and often confused Lord Uffenham, and Uffenham's niece Jane. A chance meeting between Bill and Jane turns to romance, and Lord Uffenham and Keggs plot to save the day for Bill and Jane.

== Plot ==
On September 10, 1929, American millionaire J. J. Bunyan hosts a dinner for other millionaires in New York. Acting on a suggestion from Mortimer Bayliss, the curator of Bunyan's art collection, the group decide to have fun with their money by making a sort of tontine: Bunyan and nine other millionaires contribute fifty thousand dollars each to a fund, and the last son of the men to get married will receive all the money plus the compound interest accumulated. The men are not allowed to tell their sons about the tontine.

The story jumps to June 20, 1955. Retired butler Augustus Keggs is the landlord of three neighbouring homes in London suburb Valley Fields: Castlewood, Peacehaven, and The Nook. Keggs's former employer Lord Uffenham and Lord Uffenham's niece Jane live with Keggs in Castlewood. Lord Uffenham has rented out his large home, Shipley Hall (near Tonbridge), to Roscoe Bunyan, the late J. J. Bunyan's wealthy son. Jane is engaged to Stanhope Twine, an unpopular sculptor who lives in Peacehaven, though Stanhope does not have enough money to marry.

Keggs was J. J. Bunyan's butler in 1929 and knows about the tontine. The fund has grown to approximately a million dollars. He tells Roscoe that he and Stanhope are the last unmarried sons. Keggs advises him to pay Stanhope twenty thousand pounds (under the pretext of getting a percentage of his future earnings) so that Stanhope can get married and Roscoe will receive the tontine money. Bayliss volunteers to speak to Stanhope for Roscoe. Keggs is annoyed when Roscoe only rewards him with fifty pounds for the information. Bayliss privately tells Keggs that he knows nobody named Twine joined the tontine, and Keggs confesses that the only other remaining son is actually named Bill Hollister. Keggs lied to Roscoe to help Jane, who wishes to marry Stanhope. Bayliss keeps his secret since he will enjoy seeing the greedy Roscoe lose twenty thousand pounds for nothing. Roscoe is secretly engaged to actress Emma Billson (Keggs's niece) and plans to end the engagement because of the tontine. He hires private detective Percy Pilbeam to get back his letters to her mentioning marriage to avoid a breach of promise case.

Unlike Roscoe, Bill Hollister is not rich and works for art dealer Leonard Gish's Gish Galleries. Stanhope and Bill are acquaintances, and Bill helps Stanhope do business with Bayliss. Jane wants Mr Gish to sell pictures from the Uffenham family collection kept at Shipley Hall. Gish tells Bill to go to Shipley and ask Bayliss about the pictures. Bill meets Jane at Barribault's and falls in love with her. Jane also feels drawn to Bill, though she keeps in mind that she is engaged to Stanhope. At Shipley Hall, Bayliss tells Uffenham and Bill that Uffenham's pictures are all fake. When Bill abruptly asks Jane to marry him over the telephone, she gasps and ends the call. Uffenham, who likes Bill, advises him to be more tactful and warns him that Jane is engaged to Stanhope.

Bayliss delivers Roscoe's check to Stanhope. Afterwards, Bayliss tells Roscoe that Keggs lied and Stanhope is not part of the tontine. To inspire Jane to feel concern for Bill, Uffenham hits him with a tobacco jar. This is successful, and Jane and Bill admit their feelings for each other. Stanhope has ended his engagement with Jane in order to travel the world freely with his new money. Keggs offers to tell Roscoe the real identity of the other remaining contender for the tontine, if Roscoe pays him a hundred thousand dollars out of the tontine proceeds. Roscoe agrees and they sign a contract. Keggs tells Roscoe about Bill. Following Keggs's suggestion, Roscoe hires Bill at a large salary to be Bayliss's assistant so that Bill can afford to marry Jane.

Percy Pilbeam recovers Roscoe's letters. Roscoe gives him another job, to recover and destroy Keggs's contract, which Pilbeam manages to accomplish. Bayliss informs Uffenham that some of his pictures are actually valuable after all. Bill learns about the tontine but still wants to marry Jane right away, which moves Jane. Keggs realizes that Pilbeam was hired by Roscoe to destroy their contract, and also learns that Roscoe was engaged to Emma and ended the engagement because of the tontine, and had his letters destroyed to avoid a breach of promise case. Uffenham suggests that Keggs bring Emma's parents, Flossie Billson (Keggs's sister) and retired boxer Battling Billson, to confront Roscoe. The intimidating appearance of Mr Billson compels Roscoe to renew his engagement to Emma, and split the tontine money evenly with Bill and pay Keggs. Bayliss decides not to tell Bill or Roscoe that Bill's father didn't actually contribute to the tontine and Roscoe didn't have to split the money with Bill.

== Main characters ==
- Roscoe Bunyan, wealthy and greedy 31-year-old son of J. J. Bunyan, the American millionaire who hosted the 1929 dinner party where the tontine was set up
- Mortimer Bayliss, art expert and curator of the large Bunyan art collection and friend of Bill's late father, also mentioned in A Pelican at Blandings (1969)
- Augustus Keggs, dignified landlord and ex-butler, also mentioned in Ice in the Bedroom (1961) and appeared pre-retirement in A Damsel in Distress (1919)
- George, sixth Viscount Uffenham, amiable and impecunious owner of Shipley Hall who rented it out to Roscoe, also appeared in Money in the Bank (1942)
- Jane Benedick, spirited niece of Lord Uffenham who cooks and lives at Castlewood, initially engaged to Stanhope
- William "Bill" Hollister, affable and talkative assistant at the Gish Galleries in Bond Street, works for Leonard Gish who is also mentioned in Frozen Assets (1964)
- Stanhope Twine, unsuccessful and supercilious sculptor who lives at Peacehaven and is engaged to Jane
- Percy Pilbeam, the unscrupulous head of the Argus Detective Agency who appears in several other Wodehouse books, including a visit to Blandings Castle in Summer Lightning (1929)

== Publication history ==
Under the title Something Fishy, the story was published in two parts in Collier's (US) on 31 August and 14 September 1956, with illustrations by Ronald Searle. This version was shorter than the novel version. Something Fishy was also published in three parts in John Bull (UK) from 29 September to 13 October 1956, with illustrations by Edwin Phillips.

The US edition of the novel, titled The Butler Did It, was included in the Wodehouse collection Five Complete Novels, published in May 1983 by Avenel Books, New York.
