= Monty Bodkin =

Fictional character in P. G. Wodehouse stories

Montague "Monty" Bodkin (also referred to as Montrose) is a recurring fictional character in three novels of English comic writer P. G. Wodehouse, being a wealthy young member of the Drones Club, well-dressed, well-spoken, impeccably polite, and generally in some kind of romantic trouble.

== Stories ==
Monty is featured in:

- Heavy Weather (1933) – a Blandings Castle novel
- The Luck of the Bodkins (1935)
- Pearls, Girls and Monty Bodkin (1972) – quoted as "Montrose" instead of "Montague"

Monty is mentioned in:

- Uncle Fred in the Springtime (1939) – Blandings
- Stiff Upper Lip, Jeeves (1963) – Jeeves

== Life and character ==
Monty Bodkin is the second-richest member of the Drones Club (the richest being Oofy Prosser). He is tall and slender, and has butter-coloured hair. The son of a solicitor with a small country-town practice, Monty inherited his money from an aunt who married an American millionaire from Pittsburgh when she was in the chorus of a musical at the Adelphi Theatre.

=== Heavy Weather (1933) ===
When we first meet Monty Bodkin at the start of Heavy Weather, he is employed by Lord Tilbury as assistant editor of Tiny Tots, one of the many imprints of the mighty Mammoth Publishing Company, his uncle Sir Gregory Parsloe-Parsloe having prevailed upon Tilbury to give him the job at a public dinner. Monty does not work, however, because of any need for income; as he himself explains, there are "wheels within wheels". He is in love with Gertrude Butterwick but her father, named J. G. Butterwick in this novel (it will evolve), feeling that his daughter should not marry some kind of a waster, requires Monty to hold down a job for a full year, and Gertrude, being an old-fashioned sort of girl of solid middle-class stock, refuses to elope with Monty.

His time at Tiny Tots is brief, however, as he finds himself left in charge one day when the regular editor, the Reverend Aubrey Sellick, is away on vacation. His efforts at writing a piece for the "Uncle Woggly to His Chicks" column results in a swift and acrimonious parting between Bodkin and Tilbury's employ, and the hunt is on for new work. On the advice of his friend and fellow-Drone Hugo Carmody, he once again uses his uncle, this time to wangle the post of secretary to Lord Emsworth, recently vacated by Carmody. He spends a few happy days at Blandings, in company of his former fiancee Sue Brown, before events conspiring against him, particularly Lord Emsworth's suspicions of anyone connected to the Parsloe-Parsloe camp, lead to his expulsion from the post. He tries to get back in with Lord Tilbury by stealing Galahad Threepwood's reminiscences, but is scuppered by Percy Pilbeam; he later takes revenge on Pilbeam, but repents and ends up paying him handsomely for the chance to work for his Detective Agency, the Argus, for a year.

=== The Luck of the Bodkins (1935) ===
The setting of The Luck of the Bodkins is on board an ocean liner sailing to New York. Monty is determined to win back his fiancée Gertrude Butterwick, who has abruptly broken off their engagement over a misunderstanding about an old tattoo. He is continually outmanoeuvred by events around him, which include Hollywood moguls, aspiring writers, and a valuable pearl necklace being smuggled to avoid customs duty. Monty is mistaken for a government spy, pressured into taking an acting job he detests, and drawn into a blackmail scheme involving a Mickey Mouse toy filled with chocolates. He lurches from one predicament to another, often losing and regaining Gertrude’s trust along the way.

Monty's innocence and good nature remain intact, even as misunderstandings multiply and others scheme around him. The chaos reaches its peak upon arrival in New York, where the various plot threads collide, only to be resolved through a series of last-minute revelations. In classic Wodehouse fashion, order is restored: the misunderstandings are cleared up, the romance is rekindled, and Monty finally secures both a job and his engagement to Gertrude.

=== Pearls, Girls and Monty Bodkin (1972) ===
In Pearls, Girls and Monty Bodkin (the American title is The Plot That Thickened) Monty manages to hold down a job in the entertainment industry, only to be informed by J.G. Butterwick that it does not count. Surprising his fiancee's father, he immediately secures a job with his former employer in England, thanks to the efforts of his secretary. Over the course of the book, he falls in love with said secretary, and marries her after Gertrude breaks the engagement to marry a police officer.

== Adaptations ==
Royce Mills portrayed Monty Bodkin in the 1988 radio dramatisation of Heavy Weather, part of the Blandings radio series. In the 1995 TV adaptation of Heavy Weather made by the BBC and partners, also broadcast in the United States by PBS, and titled Heavy Weather, Monty Bodkin was played by Samuel West. Monty was portrayed by Nicholas Boulton in the 2000 BBC radio adaptation of The Luck of the Bodkins.
