= Money for Nothing (novel) =

1928 novel by P. G. Wodehouse

- First edition (UK)
- Author: P. G. Wodehouse
- Language: English
- Genre: Comic novel
- Publisher: Herbert Jenkins (UK); Doubleday, Doran (US)
- Publication date: 27 July 1928 (UK); 28 September 1928 (US)
- Publication place: United Kingdom
- Media type: Print

Money for Nothing is a novel by P. G. Wodehouse, first published in the United Kingdom on 27 July 1928 by Herbert Jenkins, London, and in the United States on 28 September 1928 by Doubleday, Doran, New York. Immediately prior to publication it appeared as a serial, in London Calling magazine (UK) from 3 March to 28 July 1928 and in Liberty magazine (US) between 16 June and 22 September 1928.

== Overview ==
The action is mostly set at Rudge Hall, home to miser Lester Carmody, and at Healthward Ho, a health farm run by "Chimp" Twist, along with his accomplices "Soapy" and "Dolly" Molloy, who all previously appeared in Sam the Sudden (1925), and returned in Money in the Bank (1946).

Hugo Carmody, Lester's nephew, and his friend Ronnie Fish also appear at Blandings Castle, home of Ronnie's uncle Lord Emsworth, in Summer Lightning (1929) and Heavy Weather (1933).

== Plot summary ==
As well as Lester and Hugo, John Carroll, another nephew of Lester's, also lives at Rudge Hall; he is the manager of the estate. A diffident fellow, he is in love with Pat Wyvern, the daughter of the irascible Colonel Meredith Wyvern. Pat likes John but deplores his lack of backbone. In any case, the Colonel would not hear of their marrying because he is at daggers-drawn with Lester due to an incident involving an explosion.

Lester, who is a devoted trencherman, despite his miserliness, has enrolled on a fitness course at Healthward Ho. Hugo travels over there with the aim of touching his uncle for £500 to start a nightclub with his friend Ronnie Fish. Predictably he is rebuffed.

John travels up to London to meet Pat, who has just returned from France. Hugo hitches a ride. They all go out to a nightclub, The Mustard Spoon, where they are joined by Ronnie and by Soapy and Dolly Molloy, whom Hugo has just met at a boxing match. Soapy and Dolly are a pair of fraudsters, and partners in crime to Chimp. They are a married couple, but are pretending to be father and daughter. John proposes to Pat, but she rejects him. The club is raided by the police and they flee.

They all end up at Rudge Hall, where Soapy tries to sell Lester some oil stocks. It emerges, to Soapy's dismay, that Lester is not the wealthy landowner he thought he was; in fact he is broke. Dolly comes up with the idea of stealing Lester's family heirlooms and claiming the insurance (the heirlooms do not legally belong to Lester, so cannot be sold). She describes the scheme as “money for nothing”. (A twist on this title phrase occurs in a callback toward the end of the book, when Lester regrets the series of fruitless expenditures that his scheming has cost him.) Lester initially attempts to steal the heirlooms himself, with disastrous results, so they rope in Chimp.

Chimp is caught in the act by Hugo, but gets away. In order to get rid of Hugo, and stop him foiling their scheme again, Lester gives him and Ronnie £500 to start their nightclub (we learn in Summer Lightning that the venture is a failure). Chimp is persuaded to have another go, and this time the burglary goes smoothly, or so it seems. But Chimp has been seen and recognised by the butler, Sturgis, who informs John.

John travels to Healthward Ho to confront Chimp. Dolly goes with him and puts knock-out drops into his drink when they arrive. Chimp locks John up in a room with bars on the window, but eventually John turns the tables on the conspirators, and learns to his horror that Lester is in on the plot.

He dashes back to Rudge Hall and confronts his uncle, who he insists make it up with Wyvern. In the meantime, Pat, thinking that John has run off with Dolly, has accepted Hugo's proposal of marriage. When she learns of John's heroism she realises the error of her ways and sweetness and light reign.

== Background ==
The setting of the novel was inspired by Hunstanton Hall, in Norfolk.

== Publication history ==
In Liberty, the story was illustrated by Wallace Morgan. It was illustrated by Wilton Williams in London Calling.

The illustration on the first US edition dust jacket was drawn Wallace Morgan. The UK edition is dedicated: "To Ian Hay Beith". John Hay Beith (who used the pen name Ian Hay) was a British writer who collaborated with Wodehouse on three plays, including a dramatisation of Wodehouse's novel A Damsel in Distress that opened in August 1928.
