= Heavy Weather (film) =

- VHS cover
- Based on: Heavy Weather by P. G. Wodehouse
- Screenplay by: Douglas Livingstone
- Directed by: Jack Gold
- Starring: Peter O'Toole; Richard Briers
- Music by: Denis King

Production
- Producers: Verity Lambert; David Shanks
- Cinematography: Ernest Vincze
- Editor: Ralph Sheldon
- Running time: 95 minutes
- Production companies: Cinema Verity; Juniper Films; WGBH Boston productions for BBC

Original release
- Network: BBC1
- Release: 24 December 1995

Heavy Weather is a television film with a screenplay by Douglas Livingstone based on the 1933 novel Heavy Weather by P. G. Wodehouse, set at Blandings Castle. It was made by the BBC and WGBH Boston, first screened by the BBC on Christmas Eve 1995 and shown in the United States on PBS's Masterpiece Theatre on 18 February 1996.

== Plot ==
Though abridged for a 90-minute film, Heavy Weather follows closely the novel of 1933, the fourth in the Blandings series. Many of the familiar elements of the Blandings books are present: the wish of Lord Emsworth's nephew, Ronnie Fish, to marry a chorus girl, Sue Brown; the concern of Emsworth's sisters, the imperious Lady Constance Keeble and Ronnie's mother Lady Julia Fish, to ensure that the reminiscences of their other brother, the Hon. Galahad Threepwood, were not published; Galahad's protectiveness towards Miss Brown, the daughter of his long lost love Dolly Henderson; the sustained efforts of the publisher Lord Tilbury to gain possession of the reminiscences; Lord Emsworth's determination that his prize Berkshire pig, the Empress of Blandings, should win the silver medal in the fat pigs class at the Shrewsbury agricultural show; Lord Emsworth's employment of a private detective, P. Frobisher Pilbeam, to protect the Empress and his rivalry with his neighbour, Sir Gregory Parsloe, of Matchingham Hall, who had not only his own designs on the fat pigs class, but, as a prospective Parliamentary candidate, an interest in suppressing Galahad's reminiscences; and the employment as Lord Emsworth's secretary of Monty Bodkin, who, as with most holders of that office, had an ulterior motive (in this instance, the need to hold down paid employment for a year in order to be considered suitable to marry one Gertrude Butterwick).

== Cast ==
- Peter O'Toole as Clarence Threepwood, Lord Emsworth
- Richard Briers as Galahad Threepwood
- Judy Parfitt as Lady Constance Keeble
- Sarah Badel as Lady Julia Fish
- Roy Hudd as Beach the butler
- Ronald Fraser as Sir Gregory Parsloe
- Richard Johnson as Lord Tilbury, the recently ennobled George "Stinker" Pyke
- David Bamber as Pilbeam
- Rebecca Lacey as Sue Brown
- Benjamin Soames as Ronnie Fish
- Samuel West as Monty Bodkin
- Bryan Pringle as Pirbright
- Matthew Byam-Shaw as Hugo Carmody
- Gertrude of Tiverton as the Empress of Blandings
- Alma-Rose of Iver as the Pride of Matchingham

== Production ==
The screenplay was written by Douglas Livingstone. The director was Jack Gold and the producer was Verity Lambert. David Shanks was co-producer. The production designer was Jane Martin.

== Filming location ==
Heavy Weather was filmed at Sudeley Castle, Gloucestershire, which was widely, though not universally, regarded as Wodehouse's model for Blandings.
