= Sam the Sudden =

1925 novel by P. G. Wodehouse

- First edition (UK)
- Author: P. G. Wodehouse
- Language: English
- Genre: Comic novel
- Publisher: Methuen (UK); George H. Doran (US)
- Publication date: 15 October 1925 (UK); 6 November 1925 (US)
- Publication place: United Kingdom
- Media type: Print (hardback & paperback)

Sam the Sudden is a novel by P. G. Wodehouse, first published in the United Kingdom on 15 October 1925 by Methuen, London, and in the United States on 6 November 1925 by George H. Doran, New York, under the title Sam in the Suburbs. The story had previously been serialised under that title in The Saturday Evening Post from 13 June to 18 July 1925.

The cast includes the recurring character Lord Tilbury, publishing magnate and founder of the Mammoth Publishing Company, who had appeared in Wodehouse's novel of the previous year, Bill the Conqueror, and who would later visit Blandings Castle in Heavy Weather (1933). It also introduced the criminals Alexander "Chimp" Twist, Dora "Dolly" Molloy and Thomas "Soapy" Molloy, who reappeared in Money for Nothing (1928), Money in the Bank (1946), Ice in the Bedroom (1961), and Pearls, Girls and Monty Bodkin (1972).

== Plot summary ==
Sam Shotter, having failed to please his uncle John B Pynsent in business, is sent to England to work for Lord Tilbury, who hopes to complete a business deal with Pynsent. To avoid being trapped in Tilbury's company, Sam opts to join his old pal "Hash" Todhunter, cook on a tramp steamer, for the trip over. On the way, he shows Hash a photo, found on a wall in a remote Canadian log cabin, of a woman with whom he has fallen in love without even knowing her name.

Arriving in England looking rather bedraggled after his trip, Sam finds Hash has borrowed all his cash to place a bet on a dog. It is the night of the Wrykyn Old Boys' dinner, and in town he runs into first Claude Bates, who, fearing Sam may be begging, flees, and later Willoughby Braddock, an old friend. Braddock is staying with Kay Derrick and her uncle Mr Wrenn while his house is decorated, and takes Sam back there, but wanders drunkenly off when they arrive; Sam is mistaken for a burglar by Claire Lippett, the maid, and ends up sleeping in the empty house next door. During the night, Sam is disturbed by someone in the hallway with a torch.

Next morning, the confusion having been sorted out, Lippett gives Sam breakfast. He sees a picture of Kay, the girl of his dreams, and finds her uncle also works for the Mammoth Publishing Company, as editor of Pyke's Home Companion. He visits Mr Cornelius, the local estate agent, and takes a lease on the empty house, "Mon Repos". He then sees Lord Tilbury, and gets himself employed on Mr Wrenn's paper.

Kay, having just quit her job with Claude Bates' aunt after he kissed her, is visiting her uncle's office when Sam arrives. Sam, overcome at having finally met her, kisses her also, upsetting her further. Lord Tilbury, worried by Sam's odd behaviour, including his sudden rental of Mon Repos, is advised by his sister Francie that there may be a romantic motivation in the form of a woman next door; but Tilbury is reassured to hear that Mr Wrenn has no children.

Sam hires Hash Toddhunter to be his cook, while "Chimp" Twist, "Soapy" and "Dolly" Molloy discuss the problem of recovering a large fortune stashed in Sam's new home by an old friend, Edward Finglass, famed for robbing the New Asiatic Bank of two million dollars in bonds. They send in Molloy, posing as a former resident of the house wishing to buy it. The scheme fails, as Sam needs to stay near Kay, and makes Hash suspicious; he buys a large dog named Amy to protect the place.

Sam's wooing of Kay begins to bear fruit, and he takes her out to lunch one day, where Lord Tilbury sees them. Having rejected Percy Pilbeam as a helper, he visits Chimp Twist's fake detective agency, and hires Twist to spy on Sam; he forces Sam to hire Twist as an odd job man, but Sam makes Twist remove his repulsive moustache. Hash and Claire become involved, but she is worried by his coolness (he is worried by her mother's nose). Following advice in the "Home Companion", she tries to make him jealous by flirting with Twist, whom Hash chases off in a fury.

The Molloys return to "Mon Repos" once more, tie up Hash and begin to search for the money, but Dolly is frightened off by Amy the dog, and Soapy, tired after fending off visitors, is caught napping by Sam, who takes away his trousers. Sam leaves him trapped while he releases Hash and takes him next door to be reunited with Claire. Heading back to his house, Sam meets Braddock, who informs him that Lord Tilbury is in there without his trousers. Sam provides him with some, but the deal between Tilbury and Sam's uncle has fallen through, and Tilbury reveals his dislike of Sam and his opinion that Sam will never be anything better than a moocher. He and Sam part angrily.

Braddock spots Twist sneaking back into the house. He follows him and captures him in the act of pulling up some floorboards. Sam, convinced by Twist's testimony that the money isn't in its supposed hiding place, lets Twist go. Sam and Kay, abandoning their hopes of a small fortune in reward money, discuss a loving but poor future. But when they hear from local historical expert Mr Cornelius that the two houses were once one, they realise that the money must be stashed in Kay's house.

== Characters ==
- Sam Shotter, a somewhat eccentric American youth
  - Mr John B. Pynsent, American export-import millionaire, Sam's uncle
  - Clarence "Hash" Todhunter, an old seafaring pal of Sam's, who becomes his cook
- Kay Derrick, a pretty young woman, whose photograph Sam falls in love with
  - Mr Matthew Wrenn, Kay's uncle and guardian
    - Claire Lippett, their maid
- Willoughby Braddock, a school friend of Sam's and an old neighbour of Kay's
  - Mrs Martha Lippett, Claire's mother, housekeeper to Braddock
- Claude Winnington-Bates, an unpleasant Wrykyn old boy
  - Mrs Winnington-Bates, mother of Claude, Kay's demanding employer
- Lord Tilbury, media mogul, who employs Sam and Mr Wrenn
- Alexander "Chimp" Twist, a crook employed by Tilbury
  - Thomas "Soapy" Molloy, an old comrade of Twist's, a conman
    - Dora "Dolly" Molloy, Molloy's wife, a fainter
  - The late Edward "Finky" Finglass, a bank robber, once a resident of Valley Fields
- Mr Cornelius, a white-bearded estate agent and amateur historian, a friend of Mr Wrenn's

== Publication history ==
The 1925 serial of Sam in the Suburbs in The Saturday Evening Post (US) was published in six parts and illustrated by F. R. Gruger. The third part was published in the 27 June 1925 issue, in which another Wodehouse story, the short story "Without the Option", was also published.

The story was serialised under the title Sam the Sudden in Sunny magazine (UK) from July 1925 to February 1926.

The UK edition is dedicated: "To Edgar Wallace". Edgar Wallace was an English writer.

The illustration on the first US edition dust jacket was drawn by May Wilson Preston.

== Adaptations ==
The story was adapted as a radio drama by Jack Inglis and aired on 24 July 1938. It was titled Semi-Detached. The cast included Jack Hobbs as Sam Shotter, Peter Madden as Mr Pynsent, Norman Shelley as Lord Tilbury, Carleton Hobbs as Mr Wrenn, Lyn Neilson as Kay Wrenn, Joan Young as Claire, Gordon McLeod as Hash Todhunter, Kenneth Kove as Willoughby Braddock, Malcolm Waring as Chimp Twist, Inez Gibbs as Dolly Molloy, and Michael Carr as Soapy Molloy. Produced by Peter Creswell, the radio drama aired simultaneously on BBC Regional Programme London, BBC Regional Programme Scotland, and BBC Regional Programme Northern Ireland.

In 1977, Levente Málnay directed A váratlan utazás, a Hungarian television film adaptation.
