= The Girl in Blue =

1970 novel by P. G. Wodehouse

- First UK edition
- Author: P. G. Wodehouse
- Language: English
- Genre: Comic novel
- Publisher: Barrie & Jenkins (UK); Simon & Schuster (US)
- Publication date: 29 October 1970 (UK); 22 February 1971 (US)
- Publication place: United Kingdom
- Media type: Print

The Girl in Blue is a novel by P. G. Wodehouse. It was first published in the United Kingdom on 29 October 1970 by Barrie & Jenkins, London, and in the United States on 22 February 1971 by Simon & Schuster, Inc., New York.

In the novel, cartoonist Jerry West falls in love with air hostess Jane Hunnicut, but before Jerry can marry her, he is faced with the task of recovering the eponymous painting, a missing Gainsborough miniature.

== Plot ==
In New York, Duane Stottlemeyer of Guildenstern's Stores tells corporation lawyer Homer Pyle that Homer's sister, Bernadette "Barney" Claybourne, has been arrested for shoplifting, despite being rich. The company will not press charges if she leaves the city. Duane proposes that Homer keep his sister away from department stores by sending her to an English country house that takes paying guests, and suggests Mellingham Hall, near the village Mellingham-in-the-Vale. Homer agrees, as he knows the brother of the man who runs it. Homer brings his sister to London to make the arrangements.

In London, comic cartoonist Gerald "Jerry" West attends jury duty, and falls in love with a fellow juror. An intelligent girl, she leads the jury deliberation to a unanimous vote. Jerry speaks with her afterwards. She enjoys his cartoons and is an air hostess on leave. They make plans for dinner later that week at Barribault's, though Jerry forgets to ask for her name. He soon remembers that he is already engaged, to the beautiful yet critical Vera Upshaw, a writer. Vera wants Jerry to demand his inheritance, which is supposed to be held in trust for three more years, from his trustee, his uncle Willoughby "Bill" Scrope. Bill's older brother, Crispin Scrope, struggles financially to maintain the manor he inherited, Mellingham Hall, and to pay off a broker's man from a repair company, obtains a loan of approximately two hundred pounds from Bill, who is a wealthy lawyer. Bill is a miniature portrait collector, and has acquired a Gainsborough miniature of a direct ancestor, titled The Girl in Blue.

Homer Pyle is a fan of Vera's books and thrilled to meet her in a book shop. With the encouragement of her mother, actress Dame Flora Faye, Vera leaves Jerry to pursue the wealthier Homer. Barney says to Homer that her shoplifting was a one-time experiment, but Homer fears she will steal The Girl in Blue and warns Bill. Homer later hides it in a desk at Bill's house. He tries to inform Bill's secretary about this but the message is lost. The girl Jerry loves happens to be contacted by Bill's legal firm about an inheritance; Bill informs Jerry that her name is Jane Hunnicut and she is now rich, having received a surprise legacy from a former passenger. Jerry is disheartened, believing he does not have enough money to marry a rich heiress. Crispin gambles half his loan from Bill on a horse, Brotherly Love. In Mellingham-in-the-Vale, Constable Ernest Simms informs Crispin that he has been disrespected and threatened by Crispin's uncouth butler Reginald Chippendale, but Crispin cannot fire Chippendale, since he is actually the broker's man. Bill discovers the miniature is gone and believes Barney stole it. He offers Cripsin two hundred pounds to steal it back from her, but Crispin likes Barney and initially refuses. However, after Brotherly Love loses, coming in second, Crispin agrees to split the reward fifty-fifty with Chippendale, who will search Barney's room.

Bill agrees to let Jerry receive his inheritance early if Jerry steals back the miniature. Homer goes to Mellingham Hall, with Vera following by paying to stay at the house. Jane loves Jerry and pays for a stay as well. Jane tries to tell Jerry he does not need money to marry her, but he is not convinced. Jerry and Chippendale both search Barney's room. Jerry is caught and hit by Barney on the head, while Chippendale escapes. Barney donates an inexpensive miniature portrait to a church jumble sale, but Crispin mistakenly believes she donated The Girl in Blue and Chippendale buys it. He will give this miniature to Crispin if Crispin pushes Constable Simms into a brook. Crispin tells Barney enough about the situation for her to volunteer to push Simms in for him; the soaked constable does not see who pushed him, but suspects Chippendale. However, this miniature proves worthless. Willoughby learns from Homer that The Girl in Blue is in his desk, and does not pay Crispin. However, he does let Jerry get his inheritance, so that Jerry can marry Jane. Jerry and Jane are both happy to hear that the legacy Jane received will be greatly reduced because of the deceased's unpaid taxes, so it will not come between them. Brotherly Love was awarded victory since the winner was disqualified, so Crispin can pay off the broker's man. Homer wants to marry Vera, until he realizes she is after his money. Barney and Crispin happily get engaged, and so do Jerry and Jane.

== Publication history ==
The dust jackets of the first UK and US editions both feature the same design on the front by Osbert Lancaster. Both dust jackets also have the same photograph on the back by Tom Blau, Camera Press, of Wodehouse walking with a dog. Lancaster and Blau are only credited in the US edition.

The story was serialized in The Australian Women's Weekly from 16 December 1970 to 30 December 1970. A condensed version of the story was published in the Canadian magazine Star Weekly, a weekend supplement of the Toronto Star, on 24 April 1971.
