= Do Butlers Burgle Banks? =

1968 novel by P. G. Wodehouse

- First US edition
- Author: P. G. Wodehouse
- Language: English
- Genre: Comic novel
- Publisher: Simon & Schuster, Inc. (US); Barrie & Jenkins (UK)
- Publication date: 5 August 1968 (US); 19 September 1968 (UK)
- Publication place: United States
- Media type: Print

Do Butlers Burgle Banks? is a novel by P. G. Wodehouse, first published in the United States on 5 August 1968 by Simon & Schuster, Inc., New York, and in the United Kingdom on 19 September 1968 by Barrie & Jenkins, London.

In the story, Mike Bond has inherited an insolvent bank, and fears what will happen if the truth is discovered. He wishes that someone would rob the bank so that the examiners will not know much money was there originally. As it happens, Mike's new butler, Horace Appleby, is actually the leader of a gang of burglars.

== Plot ==
Horace Appleby, who lives in London suburb Valley Fields, looks and acts like a butler, so he locates jewels for his burglar gang as a butler. He does not allow them to carry guns; American safe-blower Charlie Yost carried a gun, so Horace refuses to pay him. Other henchmen include Llewellyn "Basher" Evans, another safe-blower, and Ferdinand Ripley or "Ferdie the Fly", who can climb buildings. Horace goes to the races at Wellingford, Worcestershire. In nearby Mallow Hall lives Mike Bond, who recently succeeded his late uncle as owner of the house and Bond's Bank. He employs secretary Ada Cootes, and lives with his aunt Isobel Bond, who is confined to her room with a broken leg and has a nurse, Jill Willard. Someone steals Horace's wallet and Ada hits the thief, recovering the wallet. Horace thanks her and treats her to tea. Ada tells him about Bond's Bank, and Horace plans to rob it. He becomes butler at Mallow Hall to use it as a base of operations. Jill thinks he is a burglar, but she is annoyed with Mike, who once seemed to love her yet is now distant, and does not warn him. Horace has fallen for Ada and proposes to her; at first she is thrilled, but Jill warns her about Horace being a thief, and Ada turns him down.

Jill eavesdrops on a conversation between Mike and the bank trustees, General Sir Frederick Featherstone and Augustus "Gussie" Mortlake. The bank is insolvent by a hundred thousand pounds. Originally the amount was even greater, but Mike gambled with the depositors' money to bring the amount down; he will go to prison if this is discovered. Mike also mentions that his uncle took out an insurance policy for him: Mike is insured for a hundred thousand pounds if someone injures him with the intent to kill. Jill is glad that Mike's distance was due only to business problems and wants to marry him, but Mike refuses since he may go to prison. Mike wishes someone would rob the bank to hide the truth. Jill suggests to Ada, who knows the combination to the bank's large safe, that they rob the bank. Horace shoots a window with a gun from the Hall's gunroom so the police will only focus on the house. Basher retires from crime, having become religious after a revival meeting, and gives up his ill-gotten gains; Charlie appears, takes the money as his cut, and takes Basher's place. When Charlie tries to rob Gussie Mortlake, Gussie thinks of hiring Charlie to shoot at Mike for the insurance money. A policeman comes by, but Gussie tells him everything is fine, and Charlie gratefully offers his services. Mike reluctantly agrees to Gussie's plan.

Jill and Ada start burgling the bank and put money in a suitcase. Horace arrives with subordinates Ferdie, Montgomery "Smithy" Smith, and an American named Frank. Jill hides and Ada swoons inside the safe. The gang is stopped by the muscular Basher, who has threatened Charlie into staying away. The safe is open, but Basher quickly shuts it. Ferdie saw a girl inside, and Horace realizes it is Ada. He telephones Mike and admits he is burgling the bank, though Mike initially thinks Horace is drunk, and Aunt Isobel, in the background, says "Doesn't sound likely. Do butlers burgle banks?". Horace says that Ada got locked in the airtight safe. Mike provides the combination and Horace rescues Ada. Jill is discovered and Horace politely introduces her to the gang, though Frank flees. Jill is impressed with Horace and apologizes for warning Ada against marrying him; after he agrees to retire from crime, she talks to Ada, and Ada and Horace get engaged. Superintendent Jessop of the Wellingford constabulary appears, and Horace has Ferdie, Smithy, Jill, and Ada pretend they are performing an audit. Jessop leaves convinced. Mike arrives and Jill explains everything to him. Ada explains Jill's scheme to Horace. He tells Jill to bring the suitcase to the Hall. Jessop returns with his supercilious brother-in-law, Sergeant Claude Potter of Scotland Yard, and Horace claims that the bank was robbed after the audit. Potter is suspicious.

Mike tries to cancel Gussie's plan with Charlie, but Charlie has given his task to Frank, and Frank will show up at the Hall's back door to shoot at Mike. Jessop and Potter come to the house, and Potter is just about to search the suitcase when the parlourmaid says that there is a man at the back door to see Mike. Potter goes though Mike begs him not to; Potter gets shot in the arm and is expected to be in hospital for a week. Now that the police are on to him, Mike fears he will go to prison if he keeps the suitcase, but the bank will fail if he returns it. Horace, Ferdie, and Smithy finance the bank with their savings and save Mike.

== Publication history ==
The front of the first US edition dust wrapper was illustrated by John Alcorn, and that of the first UK edition dust wrapper by Osbert Lancaster.
