= George Alexander Pyke, Lord Tilbury =

Fictional character in P. G. Wodehouse stories

George Alexander Pyke, Lord Tilbury is a recurring fictional character in the stories of British author P. G. Wodehouse. Pyke is a publishing magnate, the founder and owner of the Mammoth Publishing Company. Outside his business, he has a passion for pigs and is the owner of a prize pig named Buckingham Big Boy. Pyke appears in several novels, including two set at Blandings Castle: Heavy Weather (1933) and Service With a Smile (1961).

== Inspiration ==
According to Robert McCrum, Wodehouse knew the British publishing magnate Lord Northcliffe, who served as a source of inspiration for Lord Tilbury.

== Life ==
Wodehouse introduces Pyke in Bill the Conqueror as plain Sir George Pyke. Mammoth Publishing Company is already a mighty undertaking and Pyke is about to become a Lord – he selects the Tilbury title based on the address of his headquarters, at Tilbury House on Tilbury Street.

Pyke is not a tall man and runs somewhat to fat. His similarity to Napoleon, both in physique and character, is often remarked upon. He is a widower, his late wife Lucy having left him a son named Roderick. He also has a sister named Francie, who is married to an archaeologist, and he had an elder brother, Edmund Pyke.

After school, where he knew both Lord Emsworth and his brother Galahad Threepwood and was given the nickname Stinker, he became a clerk in a solicitor's office, but soon broke into the media, founding his first magazine, Pyke's Weekly. With the success of this paper, thanks in no small part to the advice of his sister, Pyke's empire began to grow, accumulating such titles as Society Spice and Home Gossip.

Pyke's right-hand man at the Mammoth is Percy Pilbeam, an efficient young man who becomes editor of Society Spice when Pyke's son runs off, and later heads up a detective agency.

== Stories ==
George Pyke appears in the following books:

- Bill the Conqueror (1924) – in which much of his family appear, and he becomes a Lord
- Sam the Sudden (1925) – (U.S. title: Sam in the Suburbs)
- Summer Lightning (1929) – in which he only appears off-stage, acting through Pilbeam (U.S. title: Fish Preferred)
- Heavy Weather (1933) – in which he must himself come to Blandings Castle
- Service With a Smile (1961) – in which he comes up against Uncle Fred
- Frozen Assets (1964) – in which he finally falls in love (U.S. title: Biffen's Millions)

The Mammoth Publishing Company crops up in many other stories, for example providing employment for Ashe Marson and Joan Valentine in Something Fresh.

== Adaptations ==
Norman Shelley portrayed Lord Tilbury in the 1938 radio adaptation of Sam the Sudden, which was titled Semi-Detached.

Lord Tilbury was voiced by John Savident in the Blandings radio series adaptation of Heavy Weather in 1988. He was portrayed by Richard Johnson in the 1995 television film Heavy Weather.
