= Summer Moonshine =

1937 novel by P. G. Wodehouse

- Author: P. G. Wodehouse
- Publisher: Doubleday, Doran
- Publication date: 8 October 1937
- ISBN: 1585673900

Summer Moonshine is a novel by P. G. Wodehouse, first published in the United States on 8 October 1937 by Doubleday, Doran, New York, and in the United Kingdom on 11 February 1938 by Herbert Jenkins, London. It was serialised in The Saturday Evening Post (US) from 24 July to 11 September 1937 and in Pearson's Magazine (UK) between September 1937 and April 1938.

== Plot ==
Former big-game hunter Sir Buckstone Abbott, finding himself hard up, takes in paying guests at his pile, Walsingford Hall, while hoping to sell the place to a wealthy, manipulative, overbearing Princess. The Princess's estranged step-son, Joe, falls in love with Sir Buckstone's daughter, but she is engaged to a freeloader who is also cultivating the Princess in hope of gaining access to her money. Meanwhile, Joe's brother, who resides at the Hall, is the target of an elderly, resourceful process-server. Soon, many overlapping schemes, plots and romantic entanglements are going on.

== Reception ==
Wodehouse biographer Richard Usborne asserted that "The Princess, wicked stepmother and not a bit funny, is the most un-Wodehousian character in all the books. The rest of the cast here are from Wodehouse stock and Joe Vanringham is a really good buzzer."
