= Over Seventy =

Book by P. G. Wodehouse

- First edition (US)
- Author: P. G. Wodehouse
- Publisher: Simon & Schuster
- Publication date: 3 May 1956

Over Seventy is an autobiographical work by P. G. Wodehouse, including a collection of articles originally from Punch magazine. It was first published in the United States on 3 May 1956 by Simon & Schuster, Inc., New York under the title America, I Like You, and in the United Kingdom, in a considerably expanded form, on 11 October 1957, by Herbert Jenkins, London, with the Over Seventy title and the subtitle An Autobiography with Digressions.

Much of the writing describes Wodehouse's feelings concerning the United States, his adopted homeland, with the journalism and stories inserted in context.
