= Heavy Weather (Wodehouse novel) =

1933 novel by P. G. Wodehouse

- First edition (US)
- Author: P. G. Wodehouse
- Language: English
- Genre: Comedy novel
- Publisher: Little, Brown & Co, Boston (US); Herbert Jenkins (UK)
- Publication date: 28 July 1933 (US); 10 August 1933 (UK)
- Publication place: United States
- Media type: Print (hardback & paperback)
- Preceded by: Summer Lightning
- Followed by: "The Crime Wave at Blandings" (short), Uncle Fred in the Springtime (novel)

Heavy Weather is a novel by P. G. Wodehouse, first published in the United States on 28 July 1933 by Little, Brown and Company, Boston, and in the United Kingdom on 10 August 1933 by Herbert Jenkins, London. It had been serialised in The Saturday Evening Post from 27 May to 15 July 1933.

It is part of the Blandings Castle series of tales, the fourth full-length novel to be set there, and forms a direct sequel to Summer Lightning (1929), with many of the same characters remaining at the castle from the previous story. It also features the re-appearance of Lord Tilbury, who had previously appeared in Bill the Conqueror (1924) and Sam the Sudden (1925).

== Plot introduction ==
With the Hon. Galahad's reminiscences removed from the market, publisher Lord Tilbury is anxious to get hold of the manuscript, while Lady Constance Keeble and Sir Gregory Parsloe-Parsloe want to lay hands on it for quite other reasons. Lord Emsworth fears that Parsloe-Parsloe is out to spoil his prize pig Empress of Blandings' chances at the forthcoming county show, and keeps detective Pilbeam on hand to keep watch. Meanwhile, Sue Brown is anxious to hide her old friendship with Monty Bodkin from her jealous fiance Ronnie Fish, giving his mother Lady Julia a chance to talk him out of the unsuitable marriage...

== Plot summary ==
Monty Bodkin, despite his wealth, needs to hold a job down for a full year so when he is sacked from his job, he jumps at a tip that his old job as secretary is available, especially on hearing that his former fiancee will be on the premises.

Hearing that Monty is on his way, and concerned about Ronnie's jealous nature, Sue heads to London, dines with Bodkin and warns him to be distant. On the train back, they both encounter Ronnie's formidable mother and claim not to know each other. Lady Julia, having seen Sue and Monty at lunch together, tells her son about their suspicious behaviour, and Ronnie is at once convinced that Sue loves Monty.

Meanwhile, Connie and Parsloe-Parsloe, unaware of these developments, task Percy Pilbeam with obtaining Galahad's manuscript, used to ensure Sue and Ronnie's marriage is permitted. Lord Tilbury, also wanting the book, visits the castle and is rebuffed. Leaving, he calls on the Empress, but is locked in a shed by Pirbright the pig-man, instructed by a suspicious Lord Emsworth to guard the pig closely. He is released by Monty Bodkin, whom he persuades to steal the book by offering him a year's guaranteed employment—he is worried about his tenure at the castle, as Lord Emsworth suspects him, being the nephew of his rival Parsloe-Parsloe, of scheming to nobble his pig, the Empress.

Beach, catching Pilbeam in the act of grabbing the book, tells Galahad and is instructed to guard the book himself. When he overhears Tilbury and Bodkin plotting in the garden at the Emsworth Arms however, he sees the task is too much for him and hands the book on to Ronnie Fish. Fish is distracted by his loss of Sue's love, but once the storm breaks feels better; he sees Monty Bodkin, drenched from the rain, and is friendly towards him. However, when he sees "Sue" tattooed on Bodkin's chest, his mood turns sour once more.

Sue, having heard Ronnie's kind words, is also cheered and rushes to find Ronnie; when he is once more cold and distant, she breaks down and breaks off the engagement. Bodkin finds Ronnie and asks him a favour—to get Beach to hand over the book, explaining he needs it to marry his girl. Ronnie, inwardly furious, chivalrously hands it over. Gally sees Sue is upset, learns all and confronts Ronnie with his idiocy. He explains about Bodkin and Sue, and Ronnie forgives her. Gally then confronts his sisters, threatening them once more with his book; although Julia is at first unmoved, when Gally relates a few of the stories it contains concerning her late husband "Fishy" Fish, she is defeated.

Bodkin, having engaged Pilbeam to find the book for him, tells the detective he is no longer needed, revealing where he has hidden the manuscript. Pilbeam steals it, planning to auction it between Tilbury and the Connie-Parsloe syndicate, and hides it in a disused shed. He informs Lord Emsworth that Bodkin released Tilbury, and Bodkin is fired. Pilbeam is summoned to see Lady Constance, and primes himself with a bottle of champagne. She is insulting, and Pilbeam vows to sell the book to Tilbury, whom he calls promising to deliver it, but he retires to bed first to sleep off the booze.

Lord Emsworth, having moved the Empress to her new sty for safety, finds her eating the manuscript. Pilbeam sees this, and hurries to Connie and Parsloe-Parsloe, but is denied his fee when they find the pig has eaten the book. He then rushes to the Emsworth Arms, and gets a cheque out of Lord Tilbury, telling him the book is in the pigsty. Bodkin is on hand, however, and destroys the cheque and warns Emsworth by phone that someone is heading for his sty. Later, full of remorse, he offers Pilbeam a thousand pounds to employ him for a year in his agency.

While Emsworth is being badgered by his sisters into denying Ronnie his money, a mud-spattered Lord Tilbury is brought in, captured by Pirbright. Gally and Sue then appear, informing Emsworth that Ronnie has the pig in his car and will drive off with it if denied his cash. Emsworth coughs up, and the happy couple depart, much to Gally's satisfaction.

== Characters ==
- Lord Emsworth, absent-minded master of Blandings Castle
  - Lady Constance Keeble, his domineering sister, chatelaine at the castle
  - The Hon. Galahad Threepwood, Emsworth's brother
  - Lady Julia Fish, another sister of Lord Emsworth
    - Ronnie Fish, Lady Julia's short son
      - Sue Brown, a chorus girl engaged to Ronnie
  - Empress of Blandings, Lord Emsworth's cherished prize pig
    - Pirbright, Emsworth's pig-man
- Lord Tilbury, publishing magnate, an acquaintance of Lady Julia
  - Percy Frobisher Pilbeam, a former employee of Tilbury's, now head of a detective agency
  - Monty Bodkin, initially employed by Tilbury.
- Sir Gregory Parsloe-Parsloe, Emsworth's neighbour and fellow pig-rearer
- Beach, butler at the castle
- Hugo Carmody, formerly Emsworth's secretary
- Jno. Robinson, taxi-driver in Market Blandings

== Publication history ==
The Heavy Weather serial in The Saturday Evening Post was published in eight parts, with illustrations by May Wilson Preston.

The story was included in the 1979 collection Life at Blandings, published by Penguin Books, which also included Something Fresh and Summer Lightning.

== Adaptations ==
In 1988, the book was adapted as a radio drama in the Blandings radio series.

A television film adaptation, also titled Heavy Weather, was made by the BBC, with partners including WGBH Boston, screened on Christmas Eve 1995 in the UK, and shown in the US by PBS on 18 February 1996. It was directed by Jack Gold with a screenplay by Douglas Livingstone.
