= Performing Flea =

Book by P. G. Wodehouse

- First edition
- Language: English
- Genre: Non-fiction
- Publication place: United Kingdom

Performing Flea is a non-fiction book, based on a series of letters written by P. G. Wodehouse to William Townend, a friend of Wodehouse's since their schooldays together at Dulwich College. It was originally published in the United Kingdom on 9 October 1953 by Herbert Jenkins, London. The title alludes to a disparaging comment by the playwright Seán O'Casey, who, in a letter to The Daily Telegraph in July 1941, referring to Wodehouse's radio broadcasts from Berlin, wrote that "If England has any dignity left in the way of literature, she will forget for ever the pitiful antics of English literature's performing flea".

The letters are introduced and annotated by Townend, who had provided Wodehouse with the story that inspired his character Ukridge. The letters were, in some cases, heavily revised by Wodehouse for the collection with the goal of making them more entertaining.

The United States version of the book, titled Author! Author!, was published on 20 June 1962 by Simon & Schuster, Inc., New York. It was substantially reworked, with commentary by Wodehouse replacing much of Townend's contribution.
