= Louder and Funnier =

1932 essay collection by P. G. Wodehouse

First edition cover

Louder and Funnier is a collection of essays by P. G. Wodehouse, first published as a book in the United Kingdom on 10 March 1932 by Faber and Faber, London.

Most of the essays, which cover a broad range of topics, derive from articles written for the American Vanity Fair magazine between 1914 and 1923. During much of this period, Wodehouse was the magazine's drama critic, but he also wrote many other articles, often as many as four in a single month, some under pseudonyms such as "P Brooke-Haven" and "Pelham Grenville"; many of the articles which provided material for the book were published originally under these pseudonyms.

For the purposes of the book, Wodehouse substantially rewrote the articles, excising some material and adding new material; several chapters in the book derive from material in two different articles written years apart.

In his introduction to the book, Wodehouse explained that he had borrowed the title from "the old story ... of the nervous after-dinner speaker" who is speaking in a faltering undertone when a voice demands "Louder, please", to be followed soon after by another voice requesting, "Louder, please, and funnier".

== Contents ==
- The Hollywood Scandal
- To the Editor - Sir ...
- My Gentle Readers
- Thrillers
- Fair Play for Audiences
- Looking Back at the Halls
- An Outline of Shakespeare
- The Decay of Falconry
- A Day with the Swattesmore
- Prospects for Wambledon
- Fashionable Weddings and Smart Divorces
- Happy Christmas and Merry New Year
- Thoughts on the Income Tax
- Butlers and the Buttled
- A Word about Amusement Parks
- Roulette
- Chemin de Fer
- On Ocean Liners
- Photographs and Photographers
