= Sir Gregory Parsloe =

Fictional character in P. G. Wodehouse stories

Sir Gregory Parsloe-Parsloe, 7th Baronet (usually called Sir Gregory Parsloe) is a fictional character from the Blandings Castle short stories and novels of British author P. G. Wodehouse. In the stories, Parsloe resides at Matchingham Hall, near Blandings Castle, and is the rival and enemy of Lord Emsworth.

== Appearances ==
Parsloe first appears in the short story "The Custody of the Pumpkin" (included in the 1935 collection Blandings Castle and Elsewhere, but written over ten years earlier). He later shows up in several other Blandings tales, including Summer Lightning (1929), Heavy Weather (1933) and Pigs Have Wings (1953).

== Wild youth ==
While Emsworth's brother Gally is preparing his reminiscences in Summer Lightning, he reveals quite a lot about the Baronet's black past. Although the first twenty years or so of his life were relatively blameless, he went off the rails to a considerable degree, and was considered a dangerous type by his contemporaries.

When Galahad first met him, Parsloe was walking around a supper-table at Romano's, wearing a soup-tureen on his head and holding a stick of celery, claiming he was a sentry outside Buckingham Palace. He is remembered as the only man ever to have been thrown out of the Cafe de l'Europe for trying to raise the price of a bottle of champagne by raffling his trousers at the bar.

Notoriously sneaky, he once tricked Gally into parting with over ten pounds, using a fixed spinning top, and at one point, Gally asserts, doped Gally's dog Towser with steak and onions just before a rat-catching competition in the back room of the Black Footman in Gossiter Street, allowing Parsloe's dog Banjo to win the day.

While living down the river at Shepperton, where his father was Dean, he wangled free dinners by getting his dog to do tricks for parties of day-trippers, thus getting into conversation with them; he would then blithely follow them into dinner and tuck into their champagne and cigars.

Sometime in the late 'nineties (the exact year is uncertain), he stole Lord Burper's false teeth and pawned them at a shop on the Edgware Road; he was also involved in a mysterious incident revolving around the shellfish known as prawns, of which little is known, save that it took place at Ascot, "the year Martingale won the Gold Cup".

At some point in his impecunious youth, he became engaged to one Maudie Montrose, barmaid at the old Criterion, but their wedding was a wash-out thanks to some confusion over dates (although at the time both thought the other had stood them up).

== Later life ==
By the time we are first introduced to Sir Gregory, he is a rotund man in his early fifties. After he inherited a baronetcy from a cousin at the age of thirty-one, he took up a life of quiet dignity at Matchingham Hall, in the village of Much Matchingham, Shropshire. By the age of fifty-two, he has taken on the appearance of a Regency buck who has overindulged somewhat.

Like Professor Moriarty in the Sherlock Holmes books, Parsloe is the chief villain in Lord Emsworth's life, having first sustained a bitter rivalry in the raising of pumpkins for the Shrewsbury Show. After many victories for the dark side, Emsworth's prize pumpkin, "Hope of Blandings", finally managed to overturn Parsloe's previous dominance in this critical battle, as related in the short "The Custody of the Pumpkin".

In "Company for Gertrude", not long after Emsworth's pig Empress of Blandings has won the Fat Pigs Contest at the Shropshire Agricultural Show, Parsloe has lured away Emsworth's pig-tender, George Cyril Wellbeloved, in a sinister attempt to gain a crucial advantage for his own porker, Pride of Matchingham. This dark bit of treachery involved offering Wellbeloved a higher salary in order to switch allegiance, in violation of the old feudal ethic.

Emsworth was understandably shaken to his foundation by this act, to such a degree that, by the time of Summer Lightning, he is willing to believe (encouraged by his brother Galahad, who had not been on cordial terms with Parsloe since the Winter of the year 1906) that Parsloe would go as far as to kidnap the Empress.

At one time, Parsloe had to consult Percy Pilbeam on a matter of some compromising letters, and later does so again, offering him £500 to steal Galahad's manuscript, lest the revelations contained therein jeopardise his candidacy as a "Unionist" in a forthcoming by-election in the "Bridgeford and Shifley" Parliamentary Division of Shropshire. Inevitably, Parsloe is a good friend of Emsworth's domineering sister, Lady Constance Keeble, and the two form a syndicate acting through Pilbeam with the aim of destroying Galahad's book - their scheme continues into the events of Heavy Weather.

At the start of Pigs Have Wings, Parsloe has become engaged to Gloria Salt, a health-loving, athletic young girl who makes him diet. He is quite pleased when she jilts him for another, especially as soon afterwards he is reunited with his true love, Maudie.

== Adaptations ==
Theatre

- Jon Pertwee played Parsloe in John Chapman's play Oh, Clarence!, which toured in 1968 prior to playing in London's West End from August 1968 to February 1969.

Television

- Jimmy Edwards portrayed Parsloe in two episodes of the 1967 Blandings Castle series, part of the television series The World of Wodehouse.
- In a 1995 adaptation of Heavy Weather, made by the BBC and partners and broadcast in the United States by PBS, Parsloe was played by Ronald Fraser.
- In the 2013–2014 BBC series Blandings, Parsloe was played by Robert Bathurst.

Radio

- In the 1985–1992 Blandings radio series, Parsloe was voiced by Reginald Marsh.
- Michael Jayston portrayed Parsloe in the 2010 radio dramatisation of the novel Summer Lightning.
