= Money in the Bank (novel) =

1942 novel by P. G. Wodehouse

First edition (US) Cover art by Donald McKay

Money in the Bank is a novel by P. G. Wodehouse, first published in the United States on 9 January 1942 by Doubleday, Doran, New York, and in the United Kingdom on 27 May 1946 by Herbert Jenkins, London. The UK publication was delayed while Wodehouse was under suspicion of collaboration during the Second World War.

The country house Shipley Hall, which features in this novel and Something Fishy (1957), was based on a real house, Fairlawne in Kent, where Wodehouse's daughter Leonora lived after she married in 1932.

== Plot summary ==
J. G. "Jeff" Miller, a jovial and athletic writer of thrillers, attempts a career as a lawyer at the insistence of his imposing fiancée Myrtle Shoesmith. His first court appearance is ruined when he recognizes an opposing witness as Lionel Green, who was his archenemy at school. Jeff's insulting cross-questioning of Lionel is reported in the newspapers, and Myrtle disgustedly breaks off their engagement. Relieved to be free of her, Jeff gets drunk. In the ensuing uninhibited mood, he takes the unappetizing rock cakes recently given him by his housekeeper and throws them out the window. They pass through another window across the courtyard and land in the office of the J Sheringham Adair detective agency, startling a man inside. Jeff hastens over to apologise. The man, crooked American private detective Chimp Twist, thinks he is being attacked by one of the victims from his career of petty crime, and hides in a closet. Perplexed to find the office empty, Jeff nevertheless takes the opportunity to study the place and collect details for his next detective novel. He is found there by Anne Benedick, who has come to hire a detective. Lovestruck, and ready for any excuse to be with Anne, Jeff pretends to be J Sheringham Adair and accepts the job.

They are joined by Anne's uncle George, Lord Uffenham. Niece and uncle explain that Lord Uffenham keeps the family wealth as a cache of diamonds, hidden in continuously changed locations around his ancestral home of Shipley Hall. Head trauma from a car crash has caused him to forget the current hiding place. Needing a source of money while he searches for the diamonds, he has rented Shipley Hall to Anne's employer Clarissa Cork, a famous hunter, explorer, and health crusader who has turned the place into a vegetarian resort. To retain access to the property, Lord Uffenham has been masquerading as Cakebread, the butler, whom the lease forbids Mrs Cork to fire. Mrs Cork has observed her ostensible butler searching the house, and sent Anne to procure a detective to keep him under surveillance. Jeff promises Anne that he will keep Cakebread's true identity a secret. Twist hears everything from the closet, and covets the diamonds, but stays away from Shipley Hall for fear Jeff will attack him again.

Jeff goes to the Hall and meets Mrs Cork, who expands his duties to watching her nephew Lionel Green and Anne Benedick, as she fears they are romantically involved. Privately, Lord Uffenham confirms that Anne and Lionel are engaged, adding that it would please him if Jeff took Lionel's place. When the two rivals meet, Lionel wants to denounce Jeff as an impostor. He grudgingly agrees to keep quiet, in exchange for Jeff turning in a favourable report on his activities and clandestinely supplying him with meat.

Mrs Cork patronised J Sheringham Adair on the recommendation of Dolly Molloy, a guest at the Hall. Dolly and her husband Soapy are secretly small-time crooks from Chicago; her real intention was that their old accomplice Chimp Twist would keep watch on Soapy, who seemed to be flirting with Mrs Cork. After Soapy explains that he is merely trying to sell fraudulent oil stock to their hostess, the couple are startled by Jeff arriving in Twist's place. Dolly visits Chimp in London to learn what has gone wrong and he tells her about the diamonds, suggesting that the Molloys steal them and split the proceeds with him. Dolly and Soapy are obliged to keep Jeff's secret, because he has seen them covertly eating meat and can get them expelled from the vegetarian colony, which would ruin their chance of finding the loot. Displeased with this state of stalemate, Dolly begins trying to kill Jeff and make it look like an accident.

Jeff uses him time at the Hall to romance Anne. She stays loyal to Green, but grows a little disillusioned with him as he snubs her to avoid feeding his aunt's suspicions. Meanwhile, Twist receives a letter from Jeff apologising for the rock cakes, and realises he can go to the Hall without danger. The Molloys were not sincere about sharing the loot with him, and Dolly tricks him into being caught searching Cakebread's room. Twist saves himself by revealing Jeff's true identity— J. G. Miller, the man Anne and Mrs Cork both despise for being nasty to Lionel Green in court. Jeff admits that he only came to Shipley to be near Anne, and demonstrates his point by kissing her.

The kiss convinces Mrs Cork that Anne is not involved with Lionel. Relieved, and further mollified by Jeff's flattery of a book she wrote, she does not expel him from her house. She also consents to give Lionel the loan he has been requesting, to allow him to buy into partnership in an interior decorating business. Anne is offended by Lionel's continued secrecy about their engagement, which implies that he cares more about the loan. She also learns of the undignified bargain he made with Jeff.

Lord Uffenham partially recovers his memory and declares that he hid the diamonds in a jar of Pond's Tobacco. The Molloys lock Mrs Cork and her admirer Mr Trumper in the cellar and take the jar by force. Dolly bludgeons Jeff, and Anne, thinking he has been killed, realises she loves him. The Molloys drive away with the jar and Lord Uffenham releases Mrs Cork and Mr Trumper, who discovered their love for one another while in the cellar and are now engaged. In the midst of these tumultuous events, Lord Uffenham remembers that the diamonds are not in the tobacco jar. He hastens to dig them out of their true hiding place, the bank of the pond on the Hall grounds. Anne agrees to marry Jeff.

== Characters ==
- J G Miller: Called Jeff. He has just completed his studies as a barrister. He also is a player of rugby football (a scrum half) and a writer of thrillers. When the novel opens, he is engaged to Myrtle Shoesmith, and is not quite sure how they became engaged.
- Lionel Green: He is a witness for the opposing side in Jeff's first appearance as a barrister. He is Clarissa's nephew, an interior decorator whom Jeff hated at private school and called Stinker. He is a conventionally handsome man.
- Orlo Tarvin: Successful interior decorator who is willing to take Lionel in as a partner, if Lionel can invest enough cash.
- Ernest Pennefather: He is a taxicab driver suing Tarvin and who is represented by Jeff.
- Myrtle Shoesmith: Strong-willed young woman who is engaged to Jeff.
- Mr Shoesmith: He is Myrtle's father and a solicitor.
- Ma Balsam: Jeff's motherly housekeeper who makes rock cakes to serve with tea.
- Anne Benedick: She is 23 years old and secretary-companion to Clarissa. In secret, she is engaged to Lionel.
- George, Viscount Uffenham: Owner of Shipley Hall and uncle to Anne Benedick. He lets his mind go where it wanders, and he does not like banks as a place to keep the family money. He has moved the stash of diamonds almost daily, until he is in a car accident, which makes his memory erratic. He feels that if he never does remember where he hid the diamonds, he must marry the wealthy Mrs Cork, as honour demands he give his niece her portion. It is a heavy weight on him, as he does not like her. He is known as Cakebread when working as the butler at Shipley Hall.
- J Sheringham Adair: Name of the detective agency for Chimp Twist, which Jeff uses as his pseudonym at Shipley Hall.
- Dolly Molloy: Brassy, golden-haired shoplifting wife of Soapy, the brains of the couple.
- Soapy Molloy: Con man who tries to sell phony oil stocks to anyone who will listen to him.
- Alexander "Chimp" Twist: Crony of the Molloys who runs a detective agency in London, having left America behind. Small man with a large, waxed moustache.
- Clarissa Cork — Tall and energetic widow and a big game hunter who wrote the book, 'A Woman in the Wilds'. She rented Shipley Hall to run it as a place for plain living and higher thinking. She is the aunt of Lionel Green.
- Eustace Trumper: Small man who loves Clarissa Cork, and is staying at the Hall.
- Mrs Cleghorn: Guest at the Hall who wants to learn Mrs Cork's teachings.
- Mr Shepperson: Guest at the Hall who wants to learn Mrs Cork's teachings. He likes the vegetarian meals and he bathes in the pond.
- Cakebread: Lord Uffenham's pseudonym as the Shipley Hall butler

== Reviews ==
One contemporary review found this novel "very good Wodehouse" and "stopping just this side of being side-splitting."

== Allusions to other novels ==
George, sixth viscount Uffenham, a typically impecunious and absent-minded Wodehousian aristocrat appears later in the novel Something Fishy (1957), where he helps Anne's sister Jane.

The story also features the crooks Alexander "Chimp" Twist and "Dolly" and "Soapy" Molloy, who had earlier appeared in Sam the Sudden (1925) and Money for Nothing (1928).

== Publication history ==
The novel was first published as a serial in The Saturday Evening Post in November–December 1941. It was published in the US in 1942, but not in the UK until 1946 due to war time tensions between the UK and Wodehouse. Neither the US nor the UK editions had a dedication.

The edition published in Stuttgart, Germany in 1949 by Tauchnitz was dedicated to Bert Hoskins, with whom Wodehouse had been interned in Germany early in the Second World War. Wodehouse sent a gift of each of his later novels to Mr Hoskins. The novel was written in Germany, while Wodehouse was held at Tost.

A collector's edition of the novel was issued in 2005 by Abrams Press, ISBN 978-1-58567-657-6.
