= Percy Frobisher Pilbeam =

Fictional character in P. G. Wodehouse stories

Percy Frobisher Pilbeam is a fictional character in the works of P. G. Wodehouse. A journalist turned detective, he is a rather weak and unpleasant man, generally disliked by all. He appears in several novels but is perhaps best known for his involvement with the denizens of Blandings Castle, in Summer Lightning (1929) and Heavy Weather (1933).

== Character ==
Pilbeam is a rather slimy-looking man with shiny black hair in a marcelled wave, eyes a little too close together, pimples, and a shabby-looking moustache (occasionally described as "fungoid"). He has a tendency to dress in loud check suits and has a taste for pretty girls. Pilbeam possesses an efficient and practical mind, full of pep and vigour.

A member of the "Junior Constitutional Club" and an F.R.Z.S., Pilbeam is also a keen motorcyclist. His taste for girls is evident in his approval of Miss "Flick" Sheridan, and his adoration and pursuit of Sue Brown (which enrages Ronnie Fish to the extent of running amok and destroying a restaurant).

Pilbeam has a paralyzing fear of pigs, having read once that a pig, on finding a stranger in its sty, will go for him like a tiger and tear him to ribbons. He has a fondness for champagne, a drink he finds highly useful in priming himself for tense meetings with the nobility.

== Appearances ==
- Bill the Conqueror (1924) - in which Lord Tilbury first employs him as a snoop
- Sam the Sudden (1925) (U.S. title: Sam in the Suburbs) - mentioned only in passing
- Summer Lightning (1929) (US title: Fish Preferred) - in which he visits Blandings Castle
- Heavy Weather (1933) - in which he is still at Blandings
- Something Fishy (1957) (US title: The Butler Did It) - in which his agency is again employed
- Frozen Assets (US title: Biffen's Millions) (1964) - in which he is re-employed by Lord Tilbury.

== Career ==
Pilbeam is introduced in Bill the Conqueror, where he is the deputy to Roderick Pyke as editor of Society Spice. He is considered a far more capable and trustworthy man by Lord Tilbury, the head of the Mammoth Publishing Company. Pilbeam is entrusted with many delicate tasks by Tilbury and rarely disappoints.

After Roderick leaves his father's employ, Pilbeam takes over as the head of Society Spice. He leaves his job to found the Argus Detective Agency, where he impersonates a man to retrieve compromising letters for Sir Gregory Parsloe-Parsloe. Pilbeam later works at Blandings Castle into the events of Heavy Weather and is once again asked to steal Galahad's book by Parsloe-Parsloe.

He reappears in Something Fishy, published some 24 years later.

== Television ==
In a 1995 adaptation of Heavy Weather, made by the BBC and partners and broadcast in the United States by PBS, Pilbeam was played by David Bamber.
