= Ice in the Bedroom =

1961 novel by P. G. Wodehouse

- First edition (US)
- Author: P. G. Wodehouse
- Language: English
- Genre: Comic novel
- Publisher: Simon & Schuster (US); Herbert Jenkins (UK)
- Publication date: 2 February 1961 (US); 15 October 1961 (UK)
- Publication place: United States
- Media type: Print

Ice in the Bedroom is a novel by P. G. Wodehouse, first published as a book in the United States (where the title was The Ice in the Bedroom) on 2 February 1961 by Simon & Schuster, Inc., New York, and in the United Kingdom on 15 October 1961 by Herbert Jenkins, London.

It features several Wodehouse characters from earlier books, including Drones Club members Freddie Widgeon and Oofy Prosser, and the trio of criminals, "Chimp" Twist and "Soapy" and "Dolly" Molloy.

The novel has two intertwined sub-plots. Freddie Widgeon, who wishes to marry Sally Foster, is seeking to escape from a dull job in a London office to become the manager of a coffee plantation in Kenya. Meanwhile, in the normally quiet suburb of Valley Fields, where Freddie is living, a cache of jewellery, hidden in the home of Freddie's neighbour, is attracting the attention of a small gang of petty criminals.

The story is essentially a re-working of Sam the Sudden (1925), which was also set in the fictional Valley Fields, had a sub-plot in which the same three crooks were hunting for hidden treasure, and entwined this with a romantic sub-plot.

== Plot ==
Freddie Widgeon is renting a villa called Peacehaven in the idyllic South London suburb of Valley Fields, and working, unhappily, in the office of Shoesmith, Shoesmith, Shoesmith and Shoesmith, solicitors. Soapy Molloy has just moved out of the house next door (Castlewood), to be replaced by the novelist Leila Yorke. Leila is published by Popgood and Grooly (a publishing firm also mentioned in other novels including Uncle Dynamite and Galahad at Blandings), which is largely owned by Oofy Prosser. It turns out that Soapy has left some diamonds or "ice" (stolen from Oofy's wife Myrtle) in the bedroom of Castlewood. His wife Dolly, just released from jail, is determined to get it back. After several failed attempts, she comes up with the idea of trying to drive Leila out of her house by arranging for many people to knock on her door bearing cats, and later dogs.

Meanwhile, Freddie is keen to escape from his office job and go to Kenya to run a coffee plantation. He thinks he can finance this using oil stocks sold to him by Soapy. As usual he is in love, with Sally Foster, Leila's secretary. Sally is aware of Freddie's reputation with women and is unamused when he is repeatedly found in compromising situations with the glamorous Dolly.

In another sub-plot, Leila wants to find her estranged husband Joe. To this end she hires Chimp Twist. She also engages him to search for the cat perpetrator.

Dolly, Soapy and Chimp all break into Castlewood in an attempt to find the jewels, but they are surprised by George, Freddie's policeman cousin. The ice ends up in the hands of Freddie, who hopes that Oofy will reward him (Soapy's stock having turned out to be predictably worthless). But Oofy typically refuses. In the end, Mr Cornelius, the Valley Fields house agent, who's just come into a fortune, gives him the cash and all's well that ends well.

== Publication history ==
The story was originally published, in a condensed version, in Canada in the 11 November 1960 issue of the Star Weekly, the weekend magazine supplement of the Toronto Star newspaper.

The dust jacket of the first edition (US) was designed by Paul Bacon.
