= Bill the Conqueror =

1924 novel by P. G. Wodehouse

- First edition (UK)
- Author: P. G. Wodehouse
- Language: English
- Publisher: Methuen (UK); George H. Doran (US)
- Publication date: 13 November 1924 (UK); 20 February 1925 (US)
- Publication place: United Kingdom
- Media type: Print (hardback & paperback)
- Pages: 296 pp

Bill the Conqueror (subtitled His Invasion of England in the Springtime) is a novel by P. G. Wodehouse, first published in the United Kingdom on 13 November 1924 by Methuen & Co., London, and in the United States on 20 February 1925 by George H. Doran, New York, the story having previously been serialised in The Saturday Evening Post from 24 May to 12 July 1924.

The characters include Sir George Pyke (later Lord Tilbury), publishing magnate and founder of the Mammoth Publishing Company (who would later visit Blandings Castle in Heavy Weather (1933)), and his subordinate Percy Pilbeam.

== Plot introduction ==
The story revolves around a young girl whose family wants her to marry against her wishes. Big, strong Bill West, inspired by his love of Alice Coker, takes her brother Judson to London, under strict instructions to keep him sober; there he meets his old friend Flick Sheridan. Meanwhile, devious schemes are afoot at the home of Bill's uncle Cooley.

== Plot summary ==
George Pyke is overjoyed at hearing he is shortly to be made a lord, but disappointed with his wimpy son Roderick's handling of Society Spice, one of his leading publications. He hopes pressuring the timid chap to marry Flick Sheridan will be the making of him.

In New York, Bill West's love for beautiful Alice Coker has stirred him to become a go-getting type, leaving behind his wild youth, and none too soon, as his uncle Cooley, under the malign influence of white-bearded Professor Appleby, has adopted a youth named Horace and disowned his scrounging family.

Bill heads to London, ostensibly to find out why his uncle's business there is doing badly, and takes Judson with him, promising the wild lad's father (and sister) that he'll keep the dissolute fellow out of trouble. One day, thanks to one of Judson's schemes to raise money for a binge, he meets up with Flick Sheridan, friend of his youth, who has long adored him. Judson, annoyed to find his plans frustrated, roams the streets, and on reading a slanderous piece in Society Spice claiming one of his henchmen had created the Fifth Avenue Silks, heads to Tilbury House to confront the editor, Roderick Pyke. Roderick, terrified of enraged bookies, flees the scene, leaving his date Flick in the lurch; she decides to break off the engagement forthwith.

Judson, now with Bill in tow, trails Pyke to the Hammond's house, where Pyke hits Bill with a stick, enraging him. Bill gets trapped in the garden, where he runs into Flick, who, having locked herself in her room in protest at her family's plans, is now fleeing her home. Bill takes her in, and they become ever closer. She helps him out by investigating Slingsby, Cooley Paradene's man in London, in the course of which she is seen by Percy Pilbeam, tasked with finding her by her uncle. She escapes, but Pilbeam recognises Judson when he comes to complain once more about the slur in Society Spice.

Pilbeam takes Judson to the famous Cheshire Cheese for lunch, and after plying him with drink after his long abstinence, finds out his address. He reports this back to Sir George Pyke, and soon Bill and Flick are being chased across country by Pyke; they evade him by stealing his car, but realise that England is too hot for Flick. Bill writes her an introduction to Alice Coker, urging her to stay with the girl, but she is jealous of Bill's affection for her and resolves to go it alone.

At Cooley Paradene's house, Horace has been causing trouble, but plans to rob the library have made little headway; his boss Appleby hears Paradene's plans to head to England, putting Horace into a school while he visits his old friend, Flick's uncle Sinclair Hammond, and also learns that during the trip the books will be unguarded. Flick arrives, somewhat bedraggled, having been robbed of her bags and run out of money, and Paradene agrees to take her with him to England.

Bill hears, via Judson, that Alice is engaged to someone else, a chap in the steel business, but is surprised to find he doesn't care. He heads off to dispose of her photographs, but finds them hard to shake, until he runs into a young couple, the male half of which seems to recognise Bill. After leaving the man holding the photos, Bill realises it is Roderick Pyke, which in turn leads to the revelation that he loves Flick. Resolving to head back to America to seek her, he is amazed to find her arriving in London with his uncle; they proclaim their mutual love, but Aunt Francie takes Flick away to await her awful fate, of marriage to Roderick.

Judson meets his old friend Prudence Stryker, a chorus-girl from the New York stage, who tells him she knows Slingsby's secret. Judson arranges for her to meet up with Bill at a nightclub, but they are seen there by Flick, being taken out by her uncle to cheer her up; she assumes he has fallen for this other girl, and writes to say she will be marrying Pyke on Wednesday. Bill gets the letter, after confronting Slingsby about his fraud and learning that the other cannot be stopped from fleeing to South America with his ill-gotten loot. Distraught, he goes to Flick's house, but finds everyone out; everyone, that is, except Horace, who he observes passing a heavy bag out of the window to his confederate. Bill tackles the man, who escapes after a scrap, leaving Bill with the swag.

Bill goes to the church for the wedding, but Roderick doesn't turn up; Judson has visited him, and persuaded him to run away to Italy with the girl he really loves, his stenographer from Society Spice. Bill explains all to Flick, and they head off with Hammond to a registry office. Bill tells his uncle all about Horace and Slingsby, and with Cooley's grateful support he heads off to happiness with his bride.

== Characters ==
- William Paradene West, ex-Harvard footballer, known to all as Bill
- Cooley Paradene, Bill West's wealthy book-collecting uncle
- Horace French, an unpleasant youth adopted by Paradene
- Professor Appleby, Horace's white-bearded mentor
- Wilfred Slingsby, Paradene's man in London
- Judson Coker, Bill West's best friend, a devout drinker
- Alice Coker, Judson's doting sister, adored by Bill
- George Pyke, media mogul
- Roderick Pyke, Pyke's droopy son
- Frances Hammond, Pyke's doting sister
- Sinclair Hammond, Frances' husband, an archaeologist
- Felicia "Flick" Sheridan, Hammond's orphaned niece
- Percy Pilbeam, Roderick's deputy on Society Spice
- Prudence Stryker, striking-looking chorus-girl, friend of Judson and known to Slingsby

== Publication history ==
Bill the Conqueror was illustrated by May Wilson Preston in The Saturday Evening Post. The story was also serialised in The Grand Magazine (UK) between September 1925 and October 1925.

The book is dedicated: "To my Father and Mother". The illustration on the first UK edition dust jacket was drawn by Frank Marston.

Part of the plot of the story was used for Sitting Pretty, a 1924 musical with a book written by Guy Bolton and Wodehouse, with music by Jerome Kern.

== See also ==
- William the Conqueror, namesake parodied by the title
