= Barrie & Jenkins =

British publishing house

- Parent company: Random House
- Founded: 1964
- Country of origin: United Kingdom
- Headquarters location: London
- Publication types: Books

Barrie & Jenkins was a small British publishing house that was formed in 1964 from the merger of the companies Herbert Jenkins (founded by English writer Herbert George Jenkins) and Barrie & Rockliff (whose managing director was Leopold Ullstein and whose editorial staff included John Bunting and John Pattison). Barrie & Rockcliff was itself the result of the merger in the 1950s of James Barrie Books, founded in 1947 by James Barrie whose great-uncle and godfather had been the playwright J. M. Barrie, and of the Rockliff Publishing Corporation, which was "known for its theatre list".

One of the most notable authors of Barrie & Jenkins was P. G. Wodehouse, whose titles came from the Herbert Jenkins portfolio of writers which in the 1920s included authors such as Mrs Hungerford, Edna Lyall, W. Riley and Winifred Boggs. The Barrie Group eventually comprised Barrie & Rockliff, the Cresset Press, Herbert Jenkins, and Hammond & Hammond.

Barrie & Jenkins had a short commercial history and was taken over by Hutchinson, which was itself taken over by Century and then by Random House (now owned by Bertelsmann).

Barrie & Jenkins continues to exist as a specialist imprint mainly for hardback editions within the Random House stable.
