= Stanley Holloway on stage and screen =

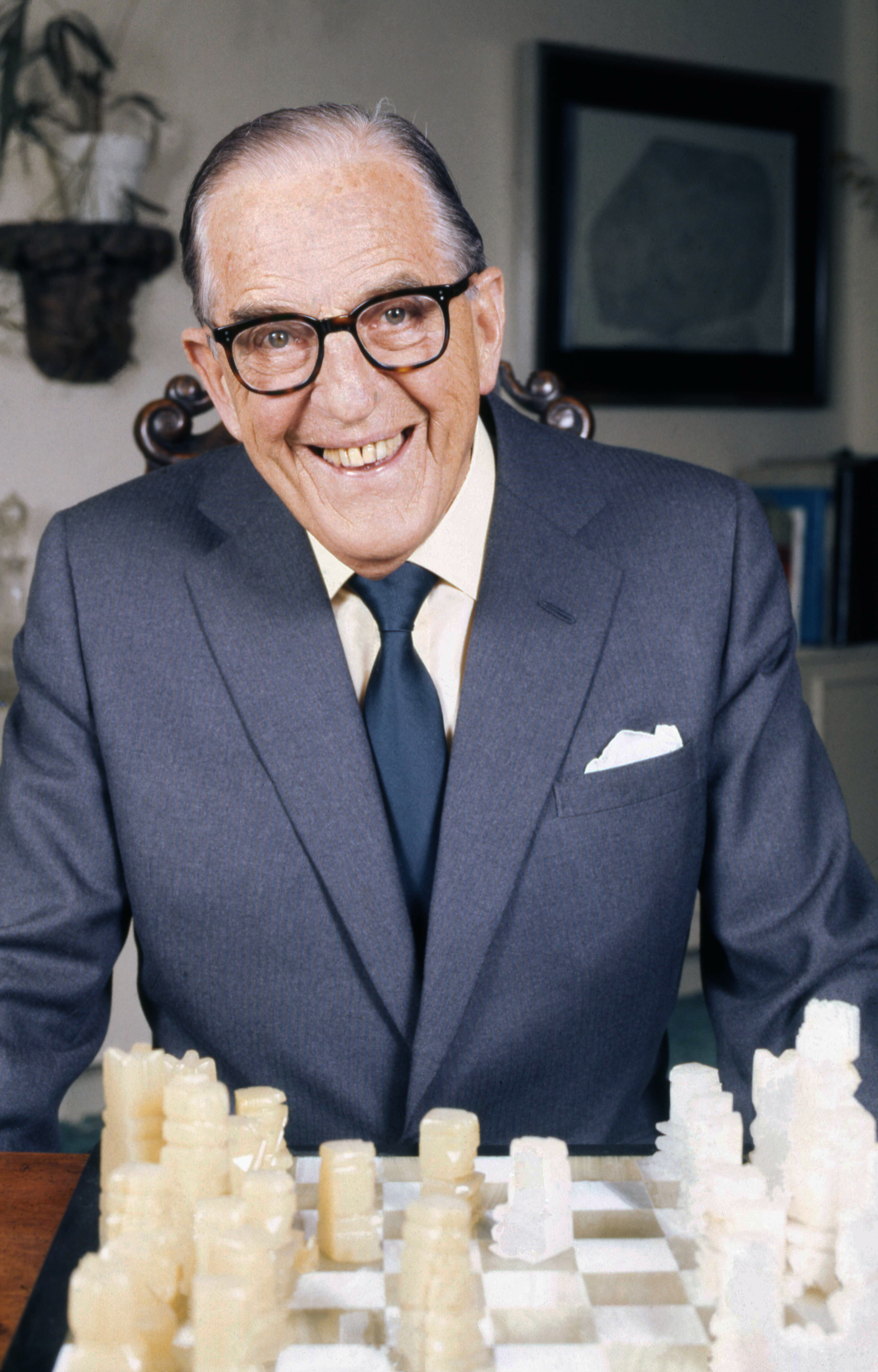
Stanley Holloway in 1974

The English comic singer, monologist and actor Stanley Holloway (1890–1982), started his performing career in 1910. He starred in English seaside towns such as Clacton-on-Sea and Walton-on-the-Naze, primarily in concert party and variety shows. The first of these, The White Coons Show, was soon followed by the more prestigious Nicely, Thanks! in 1913. From here, he went on to co-star in The Co-Optimists, a variety show which brought him to wider audience attention. After the First World War, he returned to London and found success in the West End musicals at the Winter Garden Theatre, including Kissing Time (1919), followed in 1920 by A Night Out. The Co-Optimists continued until 1927, and he then appeared in Hit the Deck, a comic musical which appeared both in London and on Broadway. Reporting for The Manchester Guardian, the theatre critic Ivor Brown praised Holloway for a singing style "which coaxes the ear rather than clubbing the head."

In between his stage roles, Holloway had a successful film career. He made his silent film debut in 1921 in The Rotters and went on to star in over 60 motion pictures, with his last being in 1976. His credits covered many genres including drama, romance and comedy and he shared successful collaborations with a number of studios, including Gaumont-British Picture Corporation, Gainsborough Studios and, most notably, Ealing Studios. He started his association with Ealing in 1934, appearing in the fifth Gracie Fields picture, Sing As We Go. After a ten-year absence from the studios, Holloway returned to star in Champagne Charlie in 1944 alongside Tommy Trinder and went on to star in Nicholas Nickleby (1947) and Another Shore (1948). However, it was the next three Ealing Comedies, Passport to Pimlico (1949), The Lavender Hill Mob (1951) and The Titfield Thunderbolt (1953), which confirmed Holloway as a mainstay of British cinema. His final film with the studio was Meet Mr. Lucifer (1953).

In 1956, Holloway revived his flagging career, creating the role of Alfred P. Doolittle in the extraordinarily successful original Broadway production of My Fair Lady, which was made into a hit film in 1964 with Holloway in the same role. Owing to the film's success, he was able to get good roles in more films, including Mrs. Brown, You've Got a Lovely Daughter alongside Herman's Hermits. His films in the early 1970s included The Private Life of Sherlock Holmes, Flight of the Doves and Up the Front. His final film was Journey into Fear, released in 1976.

== Stage shows ==
As René (centre) in A Night Out (1920)

Stage appearances of Stanley Holloway
Production	Date	Role	Theatre	Notes	Ref.
The White Coons Show	1910	Various		Six week show in Walton-on-the-Naze	
Nicely, Thanks!	1913	Various		Concert party in which Holloway first worked with Leslie Henson	
Kissing Time	16 September 1918 – 1 February 1919	Captain Wentworth	New Amsterdam Theatre, New York	Written by Guy Bolton and P. G. Wodehouse	
Kissing Time	20 May 1919 – 3 July 1920	Captain Wentworth	Winter Garden Theatre, London	Written by Guy Bolton and P. G. Wodehouse	
The Disorderly Room	1919	Various	Victoria Palace Theatre	Written by Eric Blore, Holloway starred alongside Leslie Henson, Tom Walls and Jack Buchanan. The sketch later became popularly associated with Tommy Handley, who frequently played it on stage and on radio.	
A Night Out	18 September 1920 – 18 June 1921	René	Winter Garden Theatre	Ran for 309 performances	
The Co-Optimists	27 June 1921 –	Various	Royalty Theatre	Devised by Davy Burnaby	
The Co-Optimists	November 1926 – 4 August 1927	Various	Palace Theatre	Devised by Davy Burnaby. The show ran for 500 performances.	
Hit the Deck	25 April 1927 –	Bill Smith	Belasco Theatre, New York	The musical was written by R.P. Weston, Bert Lee and Vincent Youmans with lyrics by Clifford Grey and Leo Robin.	
Hit the Deck	3 July 1927 –	Bill Smith	Hippodrome, London	Ran for 277 performances. The musical was written by R.P. Weston, Bert Lee and Vincent Youmans with lyrics by Clifford Grey and Leo Robin.	
Song of the Sea	1928	Lt. Richard Manners	His Majesty's Theatre, London	An adaption of a German operetta "Lady Hamilton" (1926). Written by Arthur Wimperis with music composed by Eduard Künneke.	
Coo-ee	1929	Various	Vaudeville Theatre, London	Revue with Billy Bennett, Dorothy Dickson and Claude Hulbert	
The Co-Optimists	1929–1931	Various		Revival of the popular show which toured the provencies, including the Princes Theatre, Bristol on 11 May 1931.	
The Savoy Follies	1931	PC	Savoy Theatre, London	Written by Riginald Arkell and Wolseley Charles. Co-starring H. M. Walker, Hal David, Douglas Byng and Florence Desmond and where Holloway first introduced the monologue The Lion and Albert.	
Here We Are Again	October 1932 –		Lyceum Theatre, London		
Three Sisters	19 April 1934 –	Eustace Titherley	Theatre Royal, Drury Lane	The production featured Victoria Hopper, Adele Dixon, Esmond Knight and Charlotte Greenwood. Written by Jerome Kern and Oscar Hammerstein II.	
Aladdin	1934	Abanazar		First appearance in pantomime, co-starring Sir Henry Lytton, as the Emperor, playing it in successive years in Leeds, London, Edinburgh and Manchester.	
London Rhapsody	1938	Various	London Palladium	Performed alongside The Crazy Gang. Holloway and comedian Jimmy Britton replaced Bud Flanagan and Chesney Allen after they pulled out for contractual reasons.	
Up and Doing	17 April 1940 –	Various	Saville Theatre, London	A revue written by Firth Shephard; co-starring Leslie Henson, Cyril Ritchard and Binnie Hale.	
Fine and Dandy	1942	Sam Small/various	Saville Theatre, London	Co-starring Leslie Henson, Douglas Byng, Dorothy Dickson and Graham Payn, the show had a run of three hundred and forty-six performances.	
Mother Goose	December 1946 –	Squire Skinflint	London Casino, London	The show was Holloway's first and only London Christmas pantomime. He first performed the monologue "Sam's Christmas Pudding" after writing it especially for the production.	
Hamlet	1951	First Gravedigger	New Theatre, London	Directed by Alec Guinness, who also played the title role. Holloway was offered the role of the First Gravedigger by Guinness who was impressed with his performance in the film version a few years earlier.	
Mr Lord Says No	1951	Henry Lord		By Michael Clayton Hutton. It was adapted for the screen the following year and was retitled The Happy Family. Holloway played the same role in the film.	
A Midsummer Night's Dream	1954	Nick Bottom		Holloway joined the Old Vic Company which toured America, performing at the Met. It opened in October 1954, having made a successful début at the Edinburgh Festival the same year.	
My Fair Lady	15 March 1956 –	Alfred P. Doolittle	Mark Hellinger Theatre	Holloway performed two songs; With a Little Bit of Luck and Get Me to the Church on Time. He was nominated for a Tony Award.	
My Fair Lady	April 1958 – 3 October 1959	Alfred P. Doolittle	Theatre Royal, Drury Lane	Holloway was replaced in the role by James Hayter	
Laughs and Other Events	10 – 17 October 1960	Himself	Ethel Barrymore Theatre, New York	Produced by Martin Tahse, Directed by Tony Charmoli, Piano: Richmond Gale and Arthur Siegel; Banjo: Jerry Silverman; Concertina: Allan Atlas	
Cool Off	31 March 1964 – 4 April 1964	Lester Linstrom, Irving, policeman and Lester Lenz	Forrest Theatre, Philadelphia	Based on the legend of Faust	
Candida	1970	Burgess		Shown at the Shaw Festival, in Niagara-on-the-Lake, Canada	
Siege	1972		Cambridge Theatre, London	The show had a three-month run with Alastair Sim, David Ambrose and Michael Bryant.	
You Can Never Tell	1973	William			

== Film ==
Film	Year	Role	Notes
The Rotters	1921	Arthur Wait	
The Co-Optimists	1929	Various	
Sleeping Car	1933	François Dubois	
The Girl from Maxim's	1933	Mongicourt	
Love at Second Sight	1934	PC	
D'Ye Ken John Peel?	1934	Sam Small	
Lily of Killarney	1934	Father O'Flynn	
Road House	1934	Donovan	
Sing As We Go	1934	Policeman	
In Town Tonight	1935		
Play Up the Band	1935	Sam Small	
Squibs	1935	Constable Charley Lee	
Sam Small at Westminster	1935	Sam Small	
Sam Small Leaves Town	1937	Richard Manning	
Song of the Forge	1937	Joe; Sir William Barrett	
The Vicar of Bray	1937	Vicar of Bray	
Cotton Queen	1937	Sam Owen	Re-issued in 1940 as Crying Out Loud
Our Island Nation	1937	Chief Petty Officer George Barber	
Sam Goes Shopping	1938	Sam; Narrator	Documentary
Major Barbara	1941	Policeman	
Salute John Citizen	1942	Oskey	
This Happy Breed	1944	Bob Mitchell	
The Way Ahead	1944	Private Ted Brewer	
Champagne Charlie	1944	The Great Vance	
The Way to the Stars	1945	Mr Palmer	
Brief Encounter	1945	Albert Godby	
Caesar and Cleopatra	1945	Belzanor	
Wanted for Murder	1946	Sergeant Sullivan	
Carnival	1946	Charlie Raeburn	
Meet Me at Dawn	1947	Emile Pollet	
Nicholas Nickleby	1947	Vincent Crummles	
Snowbound	1948	Joe Wesson	
One Night with You	1948	Tramp	
Hamlet	1948	Gravedigger	
The Winslow Boy	1948	Comedian	
Noose	1948	Inspector Kendall	
Another Shore	1948	Alastair McNeil	
Passport to Pimlico	1949	Arthur Pemberton	
The Perfect Woman	1949	Ramshead	
Midnight Episode	1950	"The Professor"; Kelvin Landseer; Prince	
One Wild Oat	1951	Alfred Gilbey	
The Lavender Hill Mob	1951	Alfred Pendlebury	
The Magic Box	1951	Broker's Man	
Lady Godiva Rides Again	1951	Mr Clark	
The Happy Family	1952	Henry Lord	
Meet Me Tonight: Fumed Oak	1952	Henry Gow	
The Titfield Thunderbolt	1953	Mr Valentine	
The Beggar's Opera	1953	Mr Lockit	
A Day to Remember	1953	Charley Porter	
Meet Mr Lucifer	1953	Sam Hollingsworth; Mr Lucifer	
Fast and Loose	1954	Mr Crabb	
An Alligator Named Daisy	1955	The General	
Jumping for Joy	1956	Captain Jack Montague	
Alive and Kicking	1959	MacDonagh	
No Trees in the Street	1959	Kipper	
No Love for Johnnie	1961	Fred Andrews	
On the Fiddle	1961	Cooksley	
British Transport Films – "The Third Sam"	1962	Narrator; monologist	Documentary
My Fair Lady	1964	Alfred P. Doolittle	
In Harm's Way	1965	Clayton Canfil	
Ten Little Indians	1965	Detective William Henry Blore	
The Sandwich Man	1966	Park Gardener	
Mrs. Brown, You've Got a Lovely Daughter	1968	George G. Brown	
How to Make it	1969	Jason Carlyle	
The Private Life of Sherlock Holmes	1970	Gravedigger	
Flight of the Doves	1971	Judge Liffy	
Up the Front	1972	The Great Vincento	
Journey into Fear	1975	Mr Mathews	

== Television ==
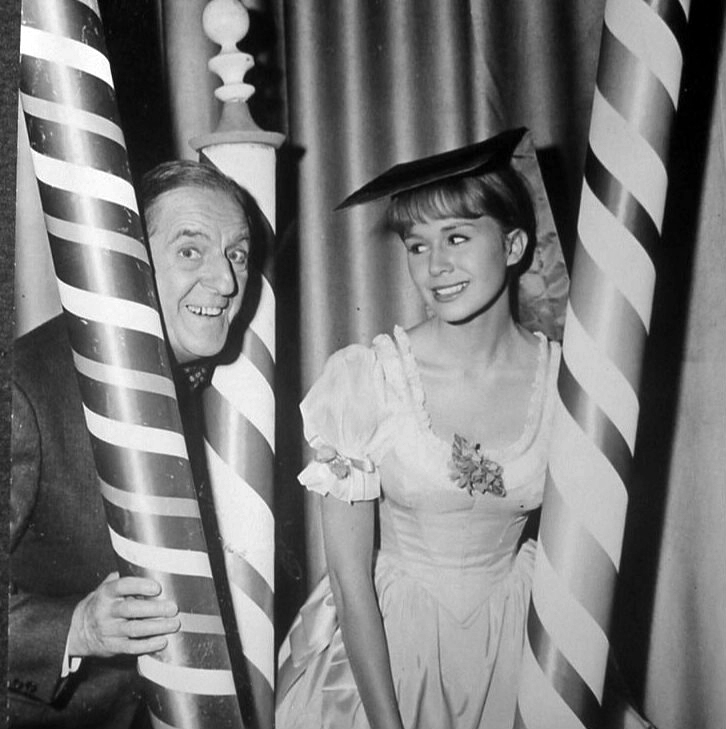
Holloway and Regina Groves in Our Man Higgins (1962)

Known television appearances of Stanley Holloway
Programme	Date	Channel (UK, unless stated)	Role	Notes	Ref.
The Tonight Show	29 July 1957	NBC (USA)			
DuPont Show of the Month: "Crescendo"	29 September 1957	CBS (USA)			
The Bell Telephone Hour – The Mikado	29 April 1960	NBC (USA)	Pooh-Bah		
An Arabian Night	9 July 1960	ITV	Ibrahim		
Our Man Higgins	3 October 1962 – 11 September 1963	ABC (USA)	Higgins	34 episodes	
Kraft Music Hall	29 October 1964	NBC (USA)			
The Red Skelton Show	16 November 1965	CBS (USA)	Eggcup Tycoon		
The Dean Martin Show	26 May 1966	NBC (USA)	Himself		
Show of the Week, "'Ere's 'Olloway"	24 May 1966	BBC2			
Blandings Castle	24 February – 31 March 1967	BBC1	Sebastian Beach	Six episodes: "Lord Emsworth and Company for Gertrude", "Blandings Castle Pig Hoo-Oo-Ey!", "Lord Emsworth Acts For The Best", "Lord Emsworth and the Crime Wave at Blandings", "The Great Pumpkin Crisis" and "Lord Emsworth and the Girl Friend"	
The Red Skelton Show	19 September 1967	CBS (USA)	Sir Whitecliff of Dover		
Armchair Theatre, "The Ballad of the Artificial Mash"	27 July 1968	ITV			
Thingumybob	3 August 1968 –	ITV	Bob Bridge		
A Time to Remember	11 June 1969 – 28 March 1972	ITV		Documentary series about the First and Second World Wars; Holloway narrated five episodes	
The Barnstormers	10 September 1969	BBC			
Run a Crooked Mile	18 November 1969	Universal Television (USA)	Caretaker		
If It Moves It's Rude: The Story of the Windmill Theatre	26 December 1969	BBC1	On-screen participant		
Dr. Jekyll and Mr. Hyde	7 March 1973	NBC (USA)	Poole		
Fifty Bighearted Years; The Variety Club of Great Britain's Tribute to Arthur Askey	17 October 1974	ITV			
Looks Familiar	17 April 1980	ITV			
Royal Variety Performance	23 November 1980	BBC1			

== See also ==
- Songs and monologues of Stanley Holloway
