= Blandings (radio series) =

- Cover of the audio cassette release of Galahad at Blandings, part of the Blandings radio series
- Genre: Comedy
- Running time: 30 minutes
- Country of origin: United Kingdom
- Language: English
- Home station: BBC Radio 4
- Starring: Richard Vernon; Ian Carmichael
- Written by: Richard Usborne, adapted from the works of P. G. Wodehouse
- Produced by: Bobby Jaye; Martin Fisher; Gareth Edwards
- Narrated by: Nigel Anthony; Ronald Fletcher; Moray Watson
- Original release: 2 February 1985 – 13 February 1992
- No. of episodes: 25

The Blandings radio series is a series of radio dramas based on the Blandings Castle stories by British comic writer P. G. Wodehouse. The stories were dramatised by Wodehouse biographer Richard Usborne. The series ran between 1985 and 1992 on BBC Radio 4.

The 1985 episodes are based on six short stories. The first five of these short stories were featured in the collection Blandings Castle and Elsewhere (1935), while the sixth, "The Crime Wave at Blandings", was collected in Lord Emsworth and Others (1937). The later episodes are based on four novels published between 1929 and 1965.

== Production ==
The short story episodes broadcast in 1985 were produced by Bobby Jaye. Martin Fisher produced the episodes based on Summer Lightning, Pigs Have Wings and Heavy Weather, and Gareth Edwards produced the episodes based on Galahad at Blandings.

== Main cast ==
- Narrator – Nigel Anthony (short stories), Ronald Fletcher (Summer Lightning), Moray Watson (the other novels)
- Clarence Threepwood, 9th Earl of Emsworth – Richard Vernon
- The Hon. Galahad Threepwood – Ian Carmichael
- Beach – Lockwood West (short stories), Timothy Bateson (Summer Lightning and Pigs Have Wings), John Rapley (Heavy Weather), Harold Innocent (Galahad at Blandings)
- Lady Constance Keeble – Margot Boyd (short stories), Elizabeth Spriggs (Summer Lightning, Heavy Weather), Joan Sanderson (Pigs Have Wings)
- The Hon. Frederick Threepwood – Steve Hodson
- Sir Gregory Parsloe-Parsloe – Reginald Marsh

== Episode list ==
The seven episodes released in 1985 are based on Blandings Castle short stories, while later episodes are based on novels.

=== Short stories ===
The additional cast for the short stories included Michael Goldie as Mr Donaldson ("The Custody of the Pumpkin"), Phillada Sewell as Mrs Twemlow, Fiona Mathieson as Aggie Threepwood, Valerie Colgan as Jane Yorke ("Lord Emsworth Grows a Beard"), Peter Tuddenham as the magistrate, Diana Martin as Angela, and Edward Duke as James Belford ("Pig-hoo-o-o-o-ey!"), Sheila Keith as Lady Marshall, Nicholas Courtney as the Rev. Rupert "Beefy" Bingham, Wendy Murray as Gertrude ("Company for Gertrude"), Susanna Dawson as Gladys ("Lord Emsworth and the Girlfriend"), Helen Atkinson-Wood as Jane, Michael McClain as Baxter ("The Crime Wave at Blandings") and Henry Stamper as McAllister.

Episode	Title	First broadcast	Original story
1	The Custody of the Pumpkin	2 February 1985	"The Custody of the Pumpkin"
2	Lord Emsworth Grows a Beard	9 February 1985	"Lord Emsworth Acts for the Best"
3	Pig-hoo-o-o-o-ey	16 February 1985	"Pig-hoo-o-o-o-ey"
4	Company for Gertrude	23 February 1985	"Company for Gertrude"
5	Lord Emsworth and the Girlfriend	2 March 1985	"Lord Emsworth and the Girl Friend"
6	The Crime Wave at Blandings: Part 1	9 March 1985	"The Crime Wave at Blandings"
7	The Crime Wave at Blandings: Part 2	16 March 1985	"The Crime Wave at Blandings"

=== Summer Lightning ===
Adapted from Summer Lightning (1929). In addition to the regular cast, the cast included Graham Seed as Ronnie Fish, Royce Mills as Hugo Carmody, Wendy Murray as Millicent, Susannah Fellows as Sue Brown, Christopher Godwin as Baxter, and Roger Sloman as Pilbeam.

Episode	Title	First broadcast
1	Trouble Brewing at Blandings	12 March 1987
2	Sensational Theft of a Pig	18 March 1987
3	A Job for Percy Pilbeam	25 March 1987
4	Activities of Beach the Butler	1 April 1987
5	Painful Scene in a Bedroom	8 April 1987
6	Gally Takes Matters in Hand	16 April 1987

=== Heavy Weather ===
Adapted from Heavy Weather (1933). Additional actors included John Savident as Lord Tilbury, Josephine Tewson as Lady Julia, Royce Mills as Monty Bodkin, Jeremy Nicholas as Hugo, Charles Collingwood as Ronnie Fish, Moir Leslie as Sue Brown, Norman Bird as Pirbright, and Roger Sloman as Pilbeam.

Episode	Title	First broadcast
1	The Wrath of Lord Tilbury	12 July 1988
2	Lady Julia Enters the Fray	19 July 1988
3	Gally's Manuscript Up For Grabs	26 July 1988
4	Cheque Books at the Ready	2 August 1988

=== Pigs Have Wings ===
Adapted from Pigs Have Wings (1952). Additional cast included Joan Sims as Maudie Digby, Susannah Fellows as Penny Donaldson, Royce Mills as Jerry Vail, Charles Collingwood as Orlo Vosper, David Graham as Binstead, and Moir Leslie as Gloria Salt.

Episode	Title	First broadcast
1	Tangled Webs	22 August 1989
2	Love Comes to the Ninth Earl	29 August 1989
3	Maudie and Tubby Make It Up	5 September 1989
4	Survival of the Fattest	12 September 1989

=== Galahad at Blandings ===
Adapted from Galahad at Blandings (1964). Along with the main cast, the episodes featured Elizabeth Spriggs as Lady Hermione, Harold Innocent as Egbert as well as Beach, Jonathan Cecil as Wilfred, Alan Marriott as Tipton, Susannah Fellowes as Sandy, Simon Treves as Sam, Vivian Pickles as Daphne, Colin McFarlane as the US policeman, Moir Leslie as Monica, Richard Pearce as Huxley, and Chris Emmett as Constable Evans.

Episode	Title	First broadcast
1	New York and After	23 January 1992
2	Sundered Hearts	30 January 1992
3	Yoo Hoo, I'm Whipple	6 February 1992
4	Houdini Galahad	13 February 1992
