= Freddie Threepwood =

Fictional character in P. G. Wodehouse stories

The Honourable Frederick Threepwood is a fictional character in the Blandings stories by P. G. Wodehouse. A member of the Drones Club affectionately known as "Freddie", he is the second son of Lord Emsworth. A somewhat simple-minded youth in his earlier days, devoted to gambling and having a good time, he brings his father nothing but trouble well into his twenties. However, after his marriage Freddie moves to America and becomes a very successful salesman of dog biscuits. In later stories, he is seen to be hard-working, industrious and -- if never exactly a genius -- capable of surprisingly sophisticated thinking, especially if it will help him make a sale.

Freddie has one brother, George, and a sister, Mildred.

== Life and character ==
Freddie's youth was a rather wild and reckless time. He was expelled from Eton for "breaking out at night and roaming the streets of Windsor in a false moustache", and was sent down from Oxford, where he had been good friends with "Beefy" Bingham, for "pouring ink from a second-storey window on the junior dean of his college". Despite two years at an expensive London crammer's, he failed to qualify for the army. During this time he gathered a wide circle of shady and dubious friends, mostly involved in the turf, including the unpleasant Mr. R Jones, and an equally broad set of gambling debts.

When Lord Emsworth is required to pay off £500 worth of said debts, Freddie is recalled to Blandings Castle, the family's traditional prison for straying youth, where he is kept for his own safety, despite the discomfort this causes his father; this is where we find him when we first meet Freddie, at the start of Something Fresh.

Thin and of medium height, Freddie is an amiable chap, though not the sharpest of minds. He is fond of the cinema, and indeed at one point writes a film scenario, which he successfully sells to the Super-Ultra-Art Film Company for $1000. He is also a great lover of detective fiction, and is awed to meet Ashe Marson, creator of Gridley Quayle, Investigator.

A fan of a pretty face, at some point in his London days he fell for a girl on the stage, Joan Valentine, and bombarded her with letters and poetry to little avail, a fact that threatens to cause some embarrassment when he becomes engaged to American heiress Aline Peters. This engagement, miraculous in the eyes of the family, comes to nothing, however, as Freddie invites George Emerson, Aline's other suitor, to Blandings, and loses her to him.

Freddie's eye for a pretty girl is once again in evidence in Leave it to Psmith, where he is enamoured of Eve Halliday, another girl he loses to a better man (if you can really call Psmith a better option), but in "The Custody of the Pumpkin" he woos and elopes with Niagara "Aggie" Donaldson, daughter of Donaldson the U.S. dog-biscuit king.

He moves to America to work for his father-in-law, becoming a successful part of the Dog-Joy empire, only returning occasionally to attend weddings or to push his products in the English market. Freddie and Aggie (short for "Niagara", where her parents honeymooned) now live in Great Neck, New York, on the North Shore of Long Island. (Wodehouse himself lived in Great Neck for a time, beginning in 1918.)

By this time, Freddie returning is Emsworth's great fear. For example, in Company for Gertrude, when Beefy tells Clarence that Freddie is returning, he 'gave a kind of sharp groan' and 'quivered all over' before falling off a stepladder. However, once the Freddie threat is over, Emsworth's great fear soon becomes Rupert Baxter returning.

Freddie's good fortune and business success changes his personality completely. When his father visits in the story "Birth of a Salesman", set three years after Freddie's marriage, Emsworth finds that "in those three years some miracle had transformed [Freddie] from a vapid young London lizard into a go-getter, a live wire and a man who thought on his feet and did it now." In other words, he is no longer the lovable idiot Freddie the reader has been acquainted with since Something Fresh. Freddie talks of nothing but Donaldson's Dog Joy—its health benefits for the modern dog, and his own part in spreading the word to eager dog owners. (In Blandings Castle and Elsewhere, Freddie is featured attempting to sell dog biscuits in England, and manages to convince his aunt Georgiana to buy two tonnes of dog biscuits.) Emsworth is mortified by the thought that "after years of regarding this child as a drone and a wastrel, the child as now regarding him as one. A world's worker himself, Freddie eyed with scorn one who, like Lord Emsworth, neither toiled nor spun... And if there is one thing that pierces the armour of an English father of the upper classes it is to be looked down on by his younger son." Stung, Emsworth regains his confidence by helping a young woman sell richly bound encyclopedias of Sport door to door.

== Appearances ==
Freddie appears in four Blandings novels, and seven short stories:

- Something Fresh (1915)
- Leave it to Psmith (1923)
- "The Custody of the Pumpkin" (1924, collected in Blandings Castle)
- "Lord Emsworth Acts for the Best" (1926, collected in Blandings Castle)
- "Company for Gertrude" (1928, collected in Blandings Castle)
- "The Go-getter" (1931, collected in Blandings Castle)
- Full Moon (1947)
- "Birth of a Salesman" (1950, not set at Blandings, collected in Nothing Serious)
- "Sticky Wicket at Blandings" (1966, collected in Plum Pie)
- "Life with Freddie" (1966, not set at Blandings, collected in Plum Pie)
- Sunset at Blandings (1977)

Freddie is also mentioned briefly in the fourth chapter of the Jeeves novel The Code of the Woosters, in which Bertie Wooster refers to both Freddie and Blandings.

== Portrayals ==
Television

- In the 1967 Blandings Castle series, part of the television series The World of Wodehouse, Freddie was played by Derek Nimmo.
- In the 2013–2014 TV series Blandings, he was played by Jack Farthing.

Film

- In the 1933 film Leave It to Me, Freddie was played by Melville Cooper.

Radio

- Freddie was portrayed by Carleton Hobbs in a 1940 radio dramatisation of "Lord Emsworth Acts for the Best".
- David Troughton portrayed Freddie in the 1981 radio adaptation of Leave It to Psmith.
- Steve Hodson voiced Freddie in the 1985–1992 Blandings radio series.
- Matthew Whittle portrayed Freddie in the 1999 radio dramatisation of Full Moon.
- Freddie was portrayed by Matthew Wolf in the 2009 radio adaptation of Something Fresh.
- George Blagden played Freddie in the 2020 radio dramatisation of Leave it to Psmith.
