= Skinflint (disambiguation) =

Skinflint can refer to a miser, or perhaps a behaviour associated with frugality.

Skinflint may also refer to:

== Places ==
- A position advanced by the British 151st Infantry Brigade during the Second Battle of El Alamein, Egypt, 1942.

== Music ==
- Skinflint Records, a record label which released albums for Iron Cross.
- Skinflint (2006–present), a heavy metal band from Botswana.
- "Skinflint" (1988), a song from Regards from Chuck Pink by Leo Kottke, American guitarist.

== Film, television, radio and stage ==
- The Skinflint (1915), an American short silent drama film.
- Skinflint: A Country Christmas Carol (1979), an American country music-inspired TV film adaptation of A Christmas Carol.
- Mr. Skinflint (1905), a character from How Jones Lost His Roll, a silent short comedy film.
- Mr. Skinflint Parsimonious (2007–2012), a character from Bleak Expectations, a BBC Radio 4 comedy series.
- Squire Skinflint (1946), a character in Mother Goose played by Stanley Holloway.

== Literature ==
- Skafnörtungr (Skinflint), parent of Snotra, in the Gautreks saga of Norse mythology, c. 13th century.
- Skinflint Press, a publisher of novels, e.g., for Sab Grey.

== Other uses ==
- Geizhals (skinflint), German regional site for the Comparison shopping website.
