= Hog calling =

Practice of making a call to encourage pigs to approach the caller

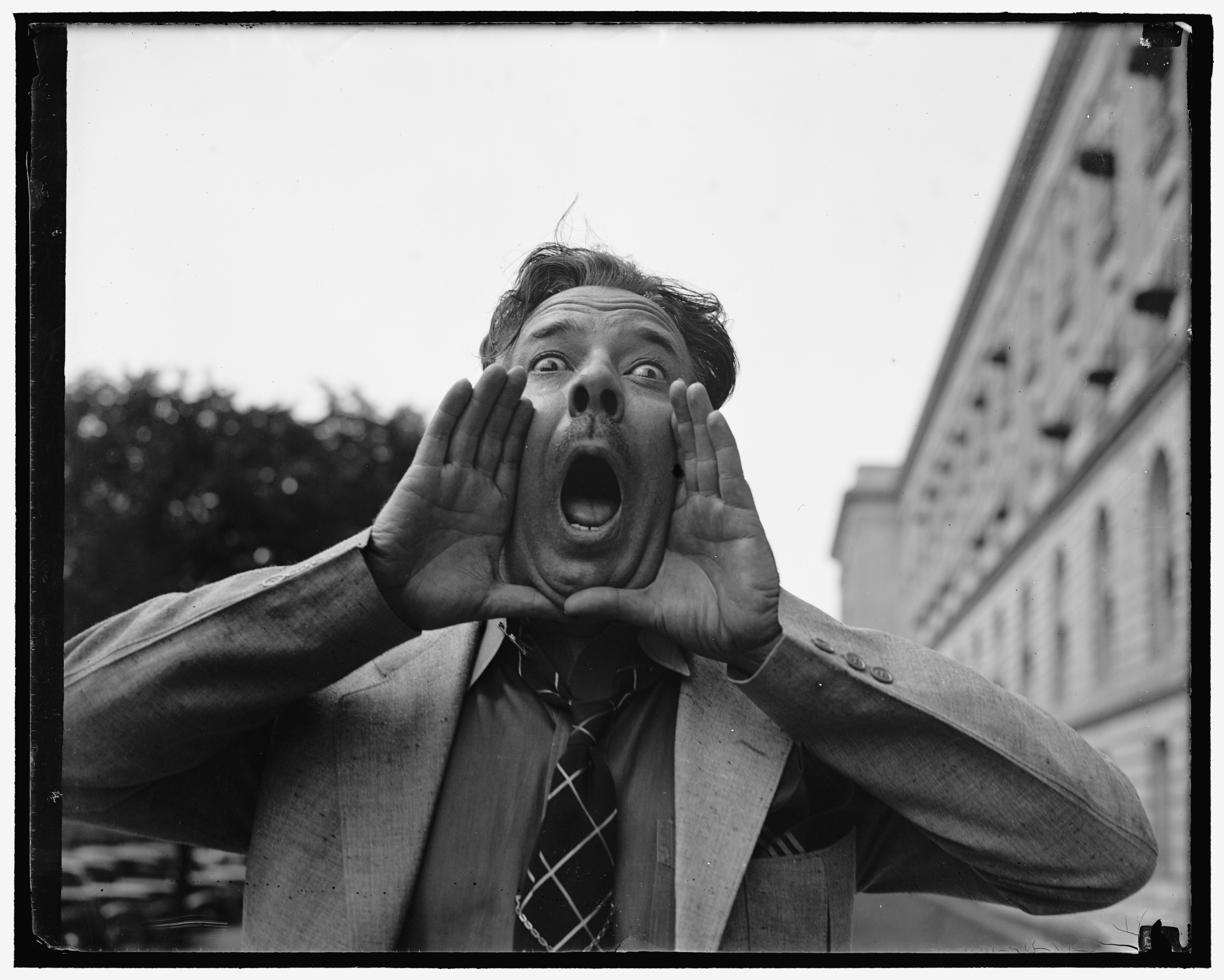
Robert L. Mouton, member of the US House of Representatives, practicing for an upcoming hog calling contest with Representative Otha D. Wearin, 1937

Hog calling, or pig calling, is the art of making a call to encourage pigs to approach the caller. Competitions in hog calling are held.

== Calls ==
To attract pigs (or family), the calls are based on four strategies: a male call to encourage territorial males to come to fight, a female call to encourage males to come to mate, a general call of dinner is served, and a piglet in distress call which works on adults.

== Aids to calling ==
Calls are usually simple woodwind instruments, sometimes adapted from other hunting lures. Electronic devices are also available.

== Contests ==
Hog calling contests are usually held in regions with pig farming.

Rules may vary between competitions. There usually is a time limit of 30 seconds, but some festivals allow for longer time. In competitions where there is no set rule for the duration of the call, it can be a criterion for judgement, awarding more points for sustained loud calls. The contestants are also judged on creativity. The contestant should aim to mimic a hog's call, but the exact type of call may vary. For example, some might call out "SOOO-o-oeeyyy", with the s sound perhaps coming from 'sow', and others "Who-o-eyyy". The use of props and costumes might also happen, but is usually frowned upon. Despite being originally about communicating with pigs scattered over a field, modern hog calling competitions will provide a microphone for contestants to amplify their calls. However, it is expected that the champion of a contest is able to render the microphone redundant. While some contests take the audience excitement as a necessary criterion of a good hog call, others consider that to be a side effect of the performance. And finally some contests divide participants by age (having a separate contest for kids and adults), while others mix everyone.

The Illinois State Fair regularly hosts a hog calling contests. The winner of the 2015 contest had already participated 24 times and won 10 of them. That competition involved four contestants.

== In popular culture ==
In the short story, "Pig-hoo-o-o-o-ey", by P.G. Wodehouse the sow Empress of Blandings misses her first keeper, Wellbeloved, when he is sent to jail for a spell; her pining is worrisome to her owner (Lord Emsworth), with the big show approaching, until she is pepped up by James Belford's hog calling techniques, returning to her trough with enough gusto to take her first silver medal.

The Arkansas Razorbacks chant is Calling the Hogs.

In July 2024, the Australian rock band King Gizzard & the Lizard Wizard released the song Hog Calling Contest, the second single from their 26th studio album, Flight b741. The song features hog calling.

== See also ==
- Duck calling
- Tarzan yell
- Yodeling
