= The Go-Getter (short story) =

- Short story by P. G. Wodehouse
- Country: United States
- Language: English
- Genre: Comedy

Publication
- Publisher: Cosmopolitan (US); Strand (UK)
- Media type: Print (magazine)
- Publication date: March 1931 (US); August 1931 (UK)

"The Go-Getter" is a short story by P. G. Wodehouse, which first appeared in the United States in the March 1931 issue of Cosmopolitan (as "Sales Resistance"), and in the United Kingdom in the August 1931 Strand. Part of the Blandings Castle canon, it features the absent-minded peer Lord Emsworth, and was included in the collection Blandings Castle and Elsewhere (1935), although the story takes place sometime between the events of Leave it to Psmith (1923) and Summer Lightning (1929).

== Plot ==
Freddie Threepwood, still trying to persuade his Aunt Georgiana of the benefits of Donaldson's Dog-Joy (even going so far as to act out the phrase "eating one's own dog food") hears that his cousin Gertrude has become infatuated with Orlo Watkins, a weedy tenor invited to the castle by Lady Constance. While visiting his friend Beefy Bingham to borrow his dog Bottles, Freddie learns that she has indeed all but "handed him the bird".

Freddie tells this to Lady Georgiana, while giving a rather poor demonstration of Dog-Joy's powers, during which Bottles is scared off by Susan, one of Lady Georgiana's Pekes. He later tries to reason with his cousin, but to no avail; the glamour of the singer has taken her over.

That evening, while the household take after-dinner coffee in the drawing room, Freddie enters with Bottles and a sack of rats, intending to demonstrate the Dog-Joy reared mongrel's ratcatching prowess; Orlo Watkins, observed by Gertrude, cringes somewhat at the sight. The family protest, and Beach is called to take the bag of rats away. Bottles remains, however, and when one of Lady Georgiana's Airedales comes in, a mighty battle commences.

Watkins, to Gertrude's disgust, leaps atop a display cabinet, while the others dither about. Just in time, Bingham enters, sees the fight in progress, and breaks it up by the simple expedient of taking one dog in each massive hand and pulling. His manly display shakes the scales from Gertrude's eyes, and she falls into his arms, while Watkins slinks off, defeated.

Lady Georgiana, meanwhile, is so impressed by Bottles' performance that she orders two tons of Dog-Joy off Freddie.

== Publication history ==
The story was illustrated by James Montgomery Flagg in Cosmopolitan. It was illustrated by Treyer Evans in the Strand.

"The Go-Getter" was included in the 1939 collection The Week-End Wodehouse (US edition), published by Doubleday, Doran & Co., New York. It was included in Short Stories, a 1983 collection of short stories by Wodehouse with illustrations by George Adamson, published by the Folio Society, London. The story was collected in A Wodehouse Bestiary, published in 1985 by Ticknor & Fields, New York, and edited by D. R. Bensen. It was also included in the anthology Man's Funniest Friend: The Dog in Stories, Reminiscences, Poems and Cartoons, published by World Publishing, New York, in 1967 and edited by William Cole.

== Adaptations ==
The BBC adapted "The Go-Getter" for television in 2013, as the second episode of Blandings.

== See also ==
- List of Wodehouse's Blandings shorts
- Complete list of the Blandings stories
