= Birth of a Salesman =

- Short story by P. G. Wodehouse
- Country: United States
- Language: English
- Genre: Comedy

Publication
- Publisher: This Week
- Media type: Print (magazine)
- Publication date: 26 March 1950

"Birth of a Salesman" is a short story by P. G. Wodehouse, which first appeared in the United States in the 26 March 1950 issue of This Week magazine. Because the story features the absent-minded peer Lord Emsworth it is often considered part of the Blandings Castle canon, even though it does not take place at (or even remotely near to) Lord Emsworth's home of Blandings Castle. The story was included in the collection Nothing Serious (1950).

The story's title is a play on Death of a Salesman, the now-classic stageplay by Arthur Miller, which had won a Pulitzer Prize the previous year.

== Plot summary ==
Lord Emsworth is visiting America for the wedding of his niece Veronica to millionaire Tipton Plimsoll. With currency restrictions forcing him to stay at Freddie's house in Long Island, Emsworth finds himself ill at ease, chafed by his son's new-found self-confidence, the result of his successes as a salesman.

Left alone in the house one day, Emsworth finds the cold lunch left for him unappealing, and resolves to fix himself some scrambled eggs. This task proves more difficult than he recalled from his more active youth, and when a young girl calls at the door selling richly bound encyclopaedias of Sport, he invites her in to make them for him and join him at his lunch.

The girl, who is only known as "Mrs Ed", reveals she is trying to earn money, as she has a baby on the way. Emsworth's sense of chivalry is aroused, and he offers to sell her encyclopaedias for her, while she has a lie down on the couch. He heads at once for the house of a near neighbour, who Freddie had earlier warned him had a conspicuous habit of throwing wild parties and filling his house with blondes while his wife was away. This behaviour, striking Emsworth as indicative of a sporting nature, persuades the elderly peer that the man must also be in need of his encyclopaedias.

Nervously approaching the house, Emsworth is embarrassed by a carful of blondes, but carries on manfully. After a failed attempt to knock at the door, a Pekinese named Eisenhower, property of one of the blondes, chases him up a tree. The homeowner, lumber king George Spenlow, already unnerved having seen Emsworth mooning over his flower beds earlier in the day, mistakes him for a private eye in the hire of his wife.

He approaches Emsworth and offers him a bribe, which Emsworth innocently confuses with an offer to buy his encyclopaedias. He takes the man's $500, and quietly slips it into Mrs Ed's handbag while she sleeps, resolving to put a stop to his son's arrogance right away.

== Publication history ==
The story was illustrated by Glen Fleischmann in This Week.

== See also ==
- List of Wodehouse's Blandings shorts
- Complete list of the Blandings stories
