= Calling the Hogs =

College athletic cheer

Calling the Hogs is a tradition of University of Arkansas students, alumni, and sports fans. The origin and date of first use are not known, but is said to have started in the 1920s when people attempted to encourage a Razorback football team that was losing. The next home game produced a group who repeated the cheer often.

The cheer is the best-known cheer at the university. It is not confined to Razorback Stadium, where it is used before every kickoff, and may be used in locales such as airports and hotels where Razorback fans unite.

== Procedure ==
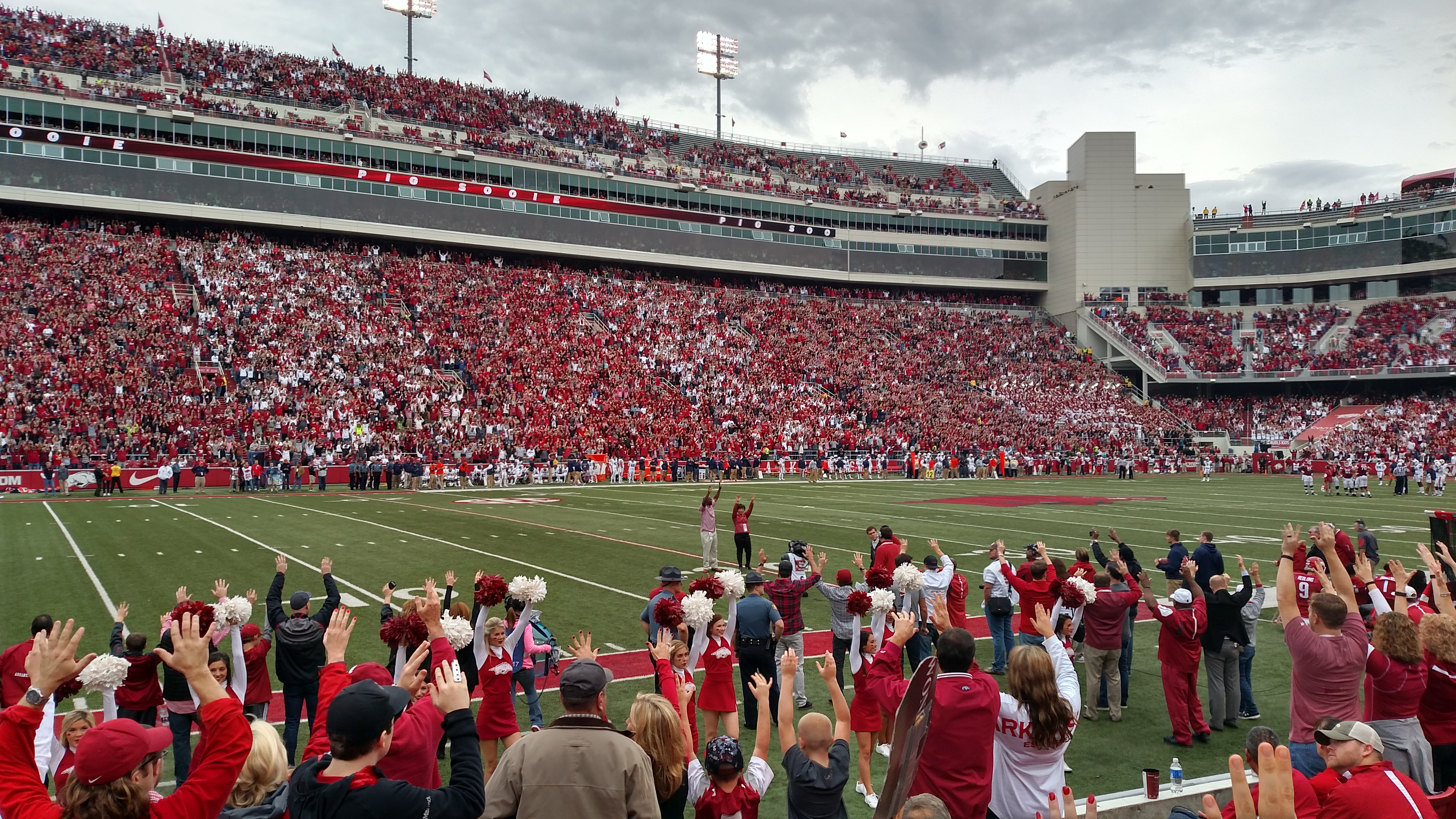
Madre Hill leads a hog call in Razorback Stadium

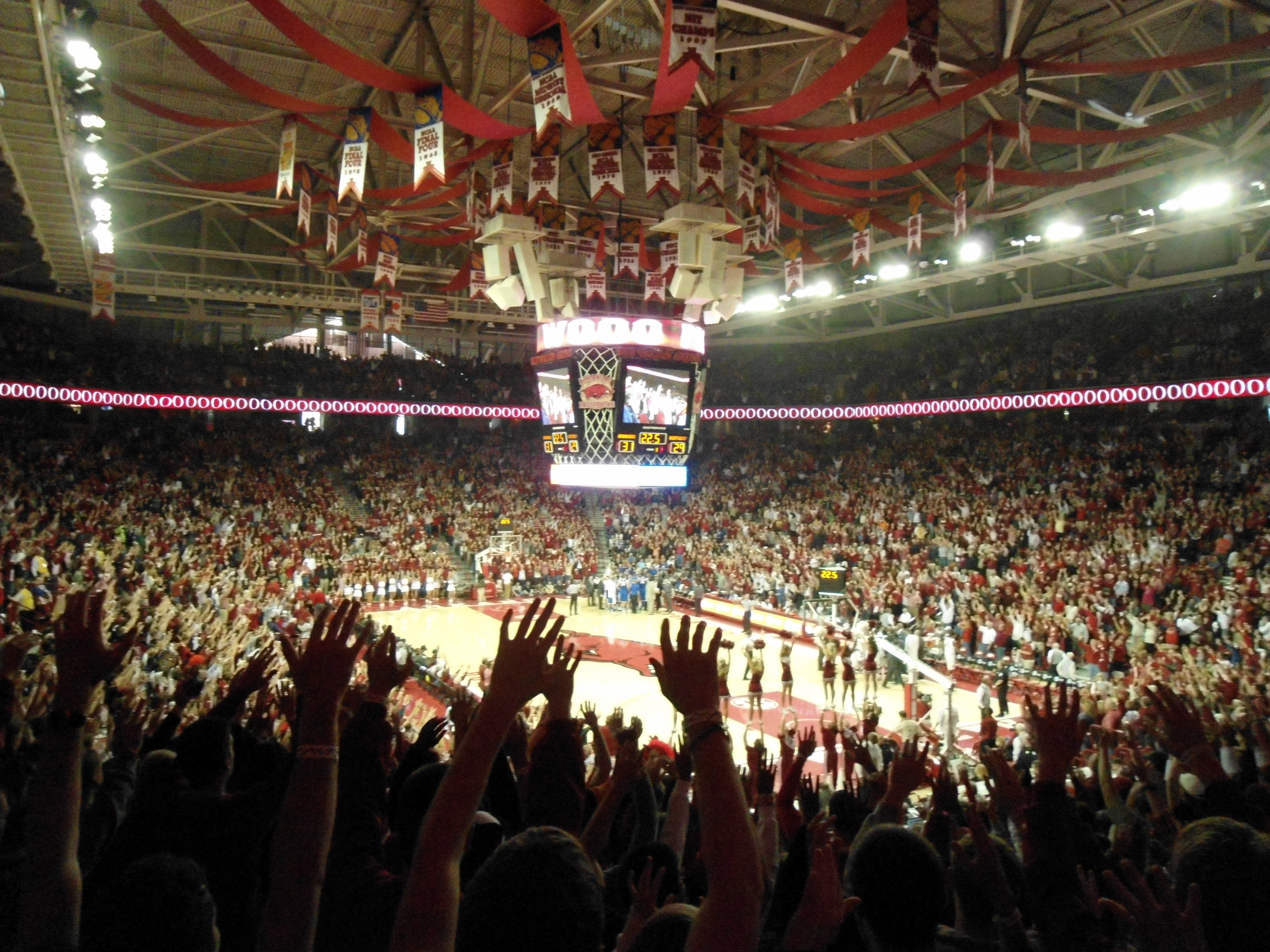
Razorbacks fans call the hogs at Bud Walton Arena during a game vs Kentucky.

Fans begin a hog call with a "Woo", which increases in volume and also includes raising the arms with fingers wiggling up and down. Razorback fans have stated that the Woo should last eight seconds. The arms are brought down during the "pig" and the hands are clenched into a fist. "Sooie" is accompanied with a fist pump. After the third call, "Razorbacks" is added with two additional fist pumps.

=== Lyrics ===
Woooooooooo, Pig! Sooie!
Woooooooooo, Pig! Sooie!
Woooooooooo, Pig! Sooie!
Razorbacks!

=== Etymology ===
The distinctive call is likely a degraded form of Latin, as the Razorback, or wild boar, is a member of the pig family, which in the Linnean classification (Latin) naming system is Suidae. 'Sooie' is a pig-calling call in northeast England, as is 'Giss giss'.

== See also ==
- Hog calling
