= Blandings Castle and Elsewhere =

1935 short story collection by P. G. Wodehouse

First edition (UK)

Blandings Castle and Elsewhere is a collection of short stories by P. G. Wodehouse. It was first published in the United Kingdom on 12 April 1935 by Herbert Jenkins, London, and, as Blandings Castle, in the United States on 20 September 1935 by Doubleday Doran, New York. All the stories had previously appeared in Strand Magazine (UK) and all except the last in various US magazines.

== Overview ==
The first six stories all take place at the book's namesake Blandings Castle; they are set some time between the events of Leave it to Psmith (1923) and those of Summer Lightning (1929). Lord Emsworth of Blandings Castle is depicted as a gentleman farmer, growing prize pumpkins and especially concerned with his prize pig, Empress of Blandings; he is also concerned with his nieces and nephews as well as the love life of his younger son Freddie Threepwood. The seventh story concerns Bobbie Wickham, an acquaintance and sometime fiancée of Bertie Wooster, who also appears in three of the stories in Mr Mulliner Speaking. The last five are narrated by Mr Mulliner and are set in Hollywood among the movie studios that Wodehouse knew from his time as a screenwriter in 1930–31.

== Contents ==
=== "The Custody of the Pumpkin" ===
- US: Saturday Evening Post, 29 November 1924
- UK: Strand, December 1924

See "The Custody of the Pumpkin". (Blandings Castle story.)

=== "Lord Emsworth Acts for the Best" ===
- UK: Strand, June 1926
- US: Liberty, 5 June 1926

See "Lord Emsworth Acts for the Best". (Blandings Castle story.)

=== "Pig-hoo-o-o-o-ey" ===
- US: Liberty, 9 July 1927
- UK: Strand, August 1927

See "Pig-hoo-o-o-o-ey". (Blandings Castle story.)

=== "Company for Gertrude" ===
- UK: Strand, September 1928
- US: Cosmopolitan, October 1928

See "Company for Gertrude". (Blandings Castle story.)

=== "The Go-Getter" ===
- US: Cosmopolitan, March 1931 (as ""Sales Resistance")
- UK: Strand, August 1931

See "The Go-Getter". (Blandings Castle story.)

=== "Lord Emsworth and the Girl Friend" ===
- US: Liberty, 6 October 1928
- UK: Strand , November 1928

See "Lord Emsworth and the Girl Friend". (Blandings Castle story.)

=== "Mr Potter Takes a Rest Cure" ===
- US: Liberty, 23 January 1926 (as "The Rest Cure")
- UK: Strand, February 1926

Plot

J. H. Potter, a New York publisher, is, on the advice of his doctor, taking a restful vacation in London. He accepts an invitation to stay at Skeldings Hall, which is owned by Lady Wickham, a best-selling novelist who wants him to publish her novels in America.

Lady Wickham's daughter Roberta ("Bobbie") is in residence, and is actively trying to sabotage an impending marriage proposal by Clifford Gandle, a member of Parliament and Lady Wickham's choice to be Bobbie's husband, much to Bobbie's distress. Readers of the other Bobbie Wickham stories will know that Bobbie is an expert at using psychological tricks to create chaos that swirls around her. Some accidental events, increased by Bobbie's machinations, cause Gandle to believe that Potter is suicidal, and Potter to believe that Gandle is homicidal. Bobbie hints to her mother that Gandle is probably violent, which Lady Wickham refuses to believe. Like many Wodehouse matrons, she has strong opinions about which suitors are suitable for their children.

Gandle, urged on by Bobbie, decides that it would be wise to deprive Potter of his shaving razor. Potter, meanwhile, has barricaded himself in his room as a precaution against the presumed blood lust of Gandle. After midnight, Gandle sneaks into Potter's room by climbing through the window. Discovered by Potter, he nevertheless manages to secure the razor and exit via the window.

At breakfast the next day, Bobbie cleverly manipulates Potter into believing that it would be wise for him to leave Skeldings Hall as soon as possible, with no notice or explanation. When Gandle enters for breakfast, he sees Potter about to pop a pill into his mouth. In order to save him from suicide, Gandle rushes at Potter, who decides that he should delay his departure no more.

Potter runs off with Gandle in hot pursuit. Bobbie, meanwhile, has given her own spin on these events to her mother, who, as a result, forbids Bobbie ever to marry Gandle. A side effect is that Lady Wickham loses the opportunity to pursue a publishing contract with Potter. Once again, a female novelist trying to manipulate a publisher finds, in Wodehouse's universe, that this is easier said than done.

=== "Monkey Business" ===
- UK: Strand, December 1932 (featuring Mervyn Mulliner in magazine versions, Montrose in book)
- US: American Magazine, December 1932 (as "A Cagey Gorilla")

Plot

The story is one of those narrated by pub raconteur Mr Mulliner, and concerns his distant cousin Montrose Mulliner, who is in love with Rosalie Beamish. (In the earlier magazine appearances, the cousin's name is given as Mervyn Mulliner.) Indirectly as a result of the advice of Captain Jack Fosdyke (a self-important and possibly lying explorer), Rosalie proposes that she and Montrose be married inside the cage of a star gorilla on the movie set where the two of them work. This would, she explains, generate much publicity for the film, promote her career, and give him an excuse to ask their boss for a raise. Montrose declines, and Rosalind ends their engagement. For dinner that night, she chooses not to dine with Montrose, but with the supposedly more courageous Captain Fosdyke. Montrose goes to the gorilla's cage and tries to befriend it with a banana, despairing when he recalls that it is an elephant that never forgets, not a gorilla.

A few days later, just before dinner, Montrose encounters a staff member from the Press department, who warns him that, to stoke publicity about the film, the gorilla will be "accidentally" released from its cage, causing panic and generating press attention. This indeed happens just moments later, and Montrose finds himself stranded in a distant part of the movie lot. For safety, and to reconnoiter, he climbs the steps attached to the back of one of the large sets, whereupon he sees that the gorilla has snatched a baby from its mother and lumbered off with the infant, to the consternation of a large crowd of onlookers. A moment later, he trips and falls, and then discovers that the gorilla is towering over him, staring at him with its "hideous face," having just climbed the steps behind the set as well. Now it is revealed that the gorilla is actually an amiable, educated actor named Cecil Waddesley-Davenport, who took the baby because he is a dedicated performer and that was how he saw the scene, but now regrets this and wants the baby returned. Montrose agrees to return the baby. Having apparently rescued the baby, he defeats Captain Fosdyke and wins Rosalie's admiration.

=== "The Nodder" ===
- UK: Strand, January 1933
- US: American Magazine, January 1933 (as "Love Birds")

Plot

While discussing child characters in films portrayed by midgets, Mr Mulliner remarks that one such actor, Johnny Bingley, played a role in the affairs of his distant relative Wilmot. He tells the following story about Wilmot.

Wilmot Mulliner is a Nodder. A Nodder is similar to a Yes-Man except lower in the social scale. He is expected to nod in agreement to what the chief executive says after all the Yes-Men have said yes. Wilmot works for Mr Schnellenhamer, the head of the Perfecto-Zizzbaum Corporation, a film studio. Mabel Potter, Schnellenhamer's secretary, was formerly a bird-imitator in vaudeville. Wilmot overhears her arguing with a director about how cuckoos sound. Having grown up on a farm, Wilmot is familiar with birds and agrees with her. They grow closer together in the weeks that follow. He proposes to her, but she says she will not marry a mere nodder. Disappointed, Wilmot goes to drink at a speakeasy. Another person sits at his table, apparently a child in a Lord Fauntleroy costume. Wilmot recognizes him as the child actor Little Johnny Bingley and is surprised to see him there. Bingley asks Wilmot not to tell Schnellenhamer he was in a speakeasy, since there is a morality clause in his contract. Wilmot agrees. They become friends and visit other speakeasies together.

The next day, Mr Schnellenhamer tells his fellow executive, Mr Levitsky, that he is concerned. Bingley told him that he may have revealed to Wilmot that he is actually a midget. If this becomes known, Bingley will be worthless to them, and he has a contract for two more films. Levitsky suggests they watch Wilmot closely. If he acts unlike his usual deferential self, they will know he knows and have to pay him off. In reality, Wilmot barely remembers his night out and does not know the truth about Bingley. At a story-conference, Wilmot seems listless, which Schnellenhamer and Levitsky think means he knows, though Wilmot actually just has a hangover. Wilmot winces when he nods, which looks like a scowl to the anxious executives. Schnellenhamer talks about adding birds that go "cuckoo" to the story, but Mabel says he is wrong, to the astonishment of the many obsequious men in the room. She insists that cuckoos go "wuckoo". She says that Wilmot agreed with her, and for her sake, Wilmot risks his job by firmly agreeing with her in front of the executives. Mabel is delighted and embraces him. Schnellenhamer and Levitsky tell the others to leave. They remark that Wilmot is loyal to the firm and would never betray its secrets. They ask if he will consent to become an executive. Wilmot does not entirely understand what is going on, but he is glad he will get to marry Mabel and nods.

=== "The Juice of an Orange" ===
- UK: Strand, February 1933
- US: American Magazine, February 1933 (as "Love on a Diet")

Plot

The topic of dieting comes up at the Angler's Rest, leading Mr Mulliner to tell the following story about Wilmot (from "The Nodder").

Wilmot is now an executive at the Perfecto-Zizzbaum Corporation, a film studio. He is engaged to Mabel, the secretary of the head of the company, Mr Schnellehamer. Schnellehamer convinces Wilmot to take a large salary cut by claiming it will help the company. This upsets Mabel, who believes that Wilmot is still a Nodder at heart. She refuses to marry him unless he proves he can assert himself. Wilmot thinks there is nothing he can do, and his disappointment makes him eat more than usual. Before long, Wilmot gets indigestion. He consults a physician, who advises him to take orange juice, which the physician insists on calling "the juice of an orange", in place of meals. Wilmot goes from being very genial to very irritable as a result of being on this diet for four days. There is a plate of sandwiches at the next story-conference. The sight of Schnellenhamer enthusiastically eating a sandwich pushes Wilmot too far. He shouts at Mr Schnellenhamer to stop eating. Schnellenhamer is about to fire Wilmot when a siren goes off.

This siren warns all workers on the lot to take cover because Hortensia Burwash, the temperamental female star actress, has lost her temper. She is armed with a sword she borrowed off an actor playing a Roman soldier. Everyone flees except Wilmot, who is too busy brooding on his diet to notice, Mabel, who crouches on top of the filing cabinet, and Schnellenhamer, who hides in a cupboard. Hortensia appears and breaks an ink-pot with her sword, and some of the ink gets on Wilmot's trousers. Wilmot grabs the sword and demands that she stop. Surprised by his reaction, she apologizes and explains that she is in a bad mood because she has been on an orange juice diet for fifteen days. She is on the diet because of a strict weight clause in her contract. Wilmot sympathizes with her and borrows her sword. He makes Schnellenhamer write Hortensia a new contract without a weight clause, and tells him to restore his former salary. However, Hortensia wants Wilmot to be her new business manager, at double his old salary. Mabel is pleased and writes out the contract for Wilmot's new job.

=== "The Rise of Minna Nordstrom" ===
- UK: Strand, April 1933
- US: American Magazine, March 1933 (as "A Star is Born", omitting Anglers' Rest introduction)

Plot

The story is the fourth of five stories set in Hollywood that are narrated by pub raconteur Mr Mulliner, who tells this one while sipping his usual hot Scotch and lemon at a pub called the Angler's Rest. The barmaid has just seen a movie starring Minna Nordstrom, and was much impressed. Mr. Mulliner claims to know the story of how Nordstrom became a star–by "sheer enterprise and determination", not personal connections.

He begins by describing Vera Prebble, a parlormaid working at the home of the head of a large movie studio. She (and, according to Mulliner, nearly every other non-acting resident of Hollywood) starts demonstrating her acting prowess whenever she encounters a studio executive, who in this case is Jacob Z. Schnellenhamer. Annoyed, he fires her, and she retaliates by informing the police (accurately) that he has a stash of liquor in his cellar. Because the story takes place during Prohibition, the police raid the house and confiscate the alcohol.

But he and his wife are planning a party that evening for 150 people, and they must have liquor to serve, Prohibition or no Prohibition. So Schnellenhamer contacts several suppliers (bootleggers), but they are all busy filming movies. Then he tries contacting another studio head, who had the misfortune of having recently hired the same Vera Prebble, firing her, and suffering the same fate. The two of them move on to a third studio head, who had fired Prebble even more recently, with the same result of confiscation of his liquor.

The three studio executives band together and, in one last desperate attempt, visit the home of a fourth studio head, who happens to be away on vacation. Alas, Prebble had just been hired by him, too, and she threatens another police raid if she is not awarded a contract as a movie star. The three studio heads begin to bargain with her, each outbidding the others, until they decide to merge their firms and thus become a sole negotiator to deal with Prebble. This is the crisis that precipitates the creation of the Perfecto-Zizzbaum Corporation—by virtue of the merger of the Colossal-Exquisite, the Perfecto-Fishbein, and the Zizzbaum-Celluloid. The vacationing executive, head of the Medulla-Oblongata studio, is not present to add his company to the mix.

As the negotiations escalate and the executives near an agreement to offer Prebble a 5-year contract, the police arrive. Soon the studio heads try to bribe the police, too, by offering them movie contracts. Recalling previous rejections by the same men, the police decline the offers and head for the cellar. Prebble misleads them and locks them in the coal cellar instead of taking them to the wine cellar. Terms are agreed to. Prebble selects the stage name of Minna Nordstrom, and cannily requires the executives to sign a letter summarizing the main points of their deal before she hands over the key to the liquor.

=== "The Castaways" ===
- UK: Strand, June 1933

Plot

At the Angler's Rest, the barmaid mentions a book she is reading in which a couple of castaways are deposited on a desert island, then fall in love with each other even though each is engaged to a different person back home. Mr Mulliner steps in with a story about his nephew, Bulstrode Mulliner, and a woman named Genevieve Bootle; he claims that their situation was very similar to that story.

Mr Mulliner's nephew Bulstrode Mulliner is an Englishman who moves to Los Angeles planning to make money by striking oil. His fiancée, Mabelle Ridgway, stays in New York. A hat mixup on a train leads him to the office of Jacob Z. Schnellenhamer, the president of the Perfecto-Zizzbaum movie studio. (Both Schnellenhamer and the studio are featured in Mr Mulliner's other Hollywood stories.) Schnellenhamer proposes that Bulstrode sign a document which turns out to be a dialogue-writing contract, not a hat receipt. Schnellenhamer sends Bulstrode to a room in the "Leper Colony", a building in which writers write when working for Perfecto-Zizzbaum. The project Bulstrode has inadvertently joined is a movie adaptation of "Scented Sinners", a failed Broadway musical. 10 other writers are already working on dialogue for it.

One day another writer, Genevieve Bootle, shows up in Bulstrode's room. Although both immediately disclose that they are engaged to others (Genevieve to Ed Murgatroyd, a Chicago bootlegger), a chaste romance develops as a result of solitude and propinquity. The pressure of writing triggers a declaration of love by Bulstrode, and when he embraces Genevieve, Mabelle and Ed burst through the door, the latter carrying a sawed-off shotgun. The two had met on a train to Los Angeles. The two couples argue and break up. Mabelle and Ed meet Schnellenhamer, who tricks them, too, into signing writing contracts for "Scented Sinners". Assigned to the building called the "Ohio State Penitentiary", Ed and Mabelle soon become engaged. Bulstrode meets Ed and Mabelle in the commissary. Everyone confesses: they are all repelled by their current fiancés, and would prefer to return to their original partners. The three of them agree to confront Schnellenhamer and resign.

Schnellenhamer refuses to release them from their contracts. However, sensing unrest among the "Scented Sinners" writers, he calls a meeting to deliver a pep talk to them. This inspirational speech is interrupted by another executive, who informs Schnellenhamer that their company does not own the rights to "Scented Sinners"; a different company outbid them for the rights 11 years previously. All the contracts are thus null and void. The released writers all celebrate their freedom. Bulstrode and Mabelle are happy but have no financial resources to fall back on. Ed offers them a position in his Chicago bootlegging operation, and Bulstrode enthusiastically accepts.

== Style ==
Robert Hall used "Mr Potter Takes a Rest Cure" as an example of a Wodehouse short story where the romantic element is only a minor part of the story and treated farcically, as in Gandle's interrupted proposal of marriage to Bobbie Wickham, in contrast to stories in which romance plays a larger role or is not involved at all. The other example Hall gave of a short story similar to "Mr Potter Takes a Rest Cure" in this respect was "Uncle Fred Flits By".

In "Mr Potter Takes a Rest Cure", the pompous politician Clifford Gandle exaggerates the neutral vowel which has replaced r at the end of words such as "desire", "here", and "there" in south-east British English. It is made into a separate syllable, which Wodehouse represents with the spellings "desi-ah", "hee-yah", and "they-ah" respectively. Gandle's exaggerated pronunciation of the final vowel in the words "Nature" and "razor" is shown by the spellings "Na-chah" and "ra-zah". Some of these changes also occur in the speech of other Wodehouse characters, such as Lavender Briggs in Service with a Smile. Percy Gorringe similarly refers to his mother as "Moth-aw" in Jeeves and the Feudal Spirit.

In "The Castaways", which concerns Mr Mulliner's nephew Bulstrode Mulliner, a writer in Hollywood, writing dialogue for sound films is compared to being castaways on a desert island.

== Background ==
"The Castaways" was influenced by Wodehouse's experience writing dialogue for films. In a letter to fellow author William "Bill" Townend (dated 26 June 1930, as published in Author! Author! and Performing Flea), Wodehouse wrote: "When the Talkies came in and they had to have dialogue, the studios started handing out contracts right and left to everyone who had ever written a line of it. Only an author of exceptional ability and determination could avoid getting signed up. ... With the result that the migration to Hollywood has been like one of those great race movement of the Middle Ages. So though there is a touch of desert island about the place and one feels millions of miles from anywhere, one can always count on meeting half a dozen kindred spirits when one is asked out to dinner."

== Publication history ==
In The Strand Magazine, "Monkey Business", "The Nodder", "The Juice of an Orange", "The Rise of Minna Nordstrom", and "The Castaways" were illustrated by Gilbert Wilkinson. "Mr Potter Takes a Rest Cure" was illustrated by Charles Crombie.

In American Magazine, "Monkey Business", "The Nodder", "The Juice of an Orange", and "The Rise of Minna Nordstrom" were illustrated by Roy F. Spreter. "Mr Potter Takes a Rest Cure" was published with illustrations by Wallace Morgan in Liberty.

"Mr Potter Takes a Rest Cure", under the title "The Rest Cure", was published in the Family Herald and Weekly Star magazine (Montreal, Canada) on 8 May 1935. It was published in the Toronto Star Weekly on 11 May 1935. The story was translated into Swedish by Birgitta Hammar and published in the Stockholm magazine Böckernas värld in 1971, with illustrations by Gunnar Brusewitz.

The five Mulliner stories in the collection were collected in the Mulliner Omnibus (1935), The World of Mr. Mulliner (1972), and the Wodehouse collection The Hollywood Omnibus (1985).

"Monkey Business" and "The Rise of Minna Nordstrom" were included in the 1939 collection The Week-End Wodehouse (US edition), published by Doubleday, Doran & Co. "Monkey Business" was also included in the 1960 book The Most of P. G. Wodehouse, published in October 1960 by Simon and Schuster, New York, and A Wodehouse Bestiary, edited by D. R. Bensen and published in October 1985 by Ticknor & Fields, New York. "The Nodder" was featured in the 1985 Wodehouse collection Short Stories.

== Adaptations ==
Several of the Blandings shorts from this collection were adapted for the first series of The World of Wodehouse, broadcast in February and March 1967 in six half-hour episodes. They starred Ralph Richardson as Lord Emsworth, Derek Nimmo as Freddie Threepwood, Meriel Forbes as Lady Constance, and Stanley Holloway as Beach. Unfortunately the master tapes of all but the first part ("Lord Emsworth and the Girl Friend"), were wiped, and no known copies exist.

Some of the stories featured in the collection, "Mr Potter Takes a Rest Cure", "The Rise of Minna Nordstrom" and "The Nodder" (combined with "Monkey Business") were produced as part of the BBC's Wodehouse Playhouse series, starring John Alderton and Pauline Collins, airing in 1975 and 1976 respectively.

In 2013 and 2014, BBC television aired a series titled Blandings starring Timothy Spall as Clarence, Jennifer Saunders as Connie, and Jack Farthing as Freddie. Beach was played by Mark Williams (2013) and Tim Vine (2014).

== See also ==
- List of short stories by P. G. Wodehouse

== References and sources ==
Sources

- Hall, Robert A. Jr. (1974). The Comic Style of P. G. Wodehouse. Hamden: Archon Books. ISBN 0-208-01409-8.
- McIlvaine, Eileen; Sherby, Louise S.; Heineman, James H. (1990). P. G. Wodehouse: A Comprehensive Bibliography and Checklist. New York: James H. Heineman Inc. ISBN 978-0-87008-125-5.
- Midkiff, Neil (The Wodehouse Society [US]) (31 March 2019). "The Wodehouse short stories". P. G. Wodehouse pages. – Alphabetical list of Wodehouse's short stories, with publication and collections.
- Kuzmenko, Michel (The Russian Wodehouse Society) (11 November 2005). "Blandings Castle". Bibliography. Archived from the original on 11 November 2005. – Lists of characters and publication dates for each story.
