= The Custody of the Pumpkin =

1924 short story by P. G. Wodehouse

- Short story by P. G. Wodehouse
- 1924 Saturday Evening Post illustration by May Wilson Preston
- Country: United Kingdom
- Language: English
- Genre: Comedy

Publication
- Publisher: Saturday Evening Post (US); Strand Magazine (UK)
- Publication date: 29 November 1924 (US); December 1924 (UK)

"The Custody of the Pumpkin" is a short story by British comic writer P. G. Wodehouse. It first appeared in the United States in the 29 November 1924 issue of The Saturday Evening Post, and in the United Kingdom in the December 1924 issue of Strand Magazine. Part of the Blandings Castle canon, it features the absent-minded peer Lord Emsworth, and was included in the collection Blandings Castle and Elsewhere (1935), although the story takes place sometime between the events of Leave it to Psmith (1923) and Summer Lightning (1929).

== Plot ==
Lord Emsworth, enjoying the views around his castle with a telescope on the turret above the west wing, spies his younger son Freddie Threepwood kissing a girl in a spinney by the end of the water-meadow. Enraged, he confronts the young man, who reveals the girl is named Aggie, and is a "sort of cousin" of Head Gardener Angus McAllister. Emsworth demands that McAllister send the girl away, but the angered Scotsman hands in his notice.

Realising that McAllister has gone, he realises that deputy head gardener, Robert Barker, is not up to the job of preparing his precious pumpkin, "The Hope of Blandings", for the Shrewsbury Show, Emsworth heads up to London to retrieve the man. Outside the Senior Conservative Club, he runs into Freddie, who, unable to get the subject of pumpkins out of his father's head, awkwardly hands him a note and runs off. Emsworth learns from the note that Freddie has married Aggie that morning.

Despairing that his son has landed him with the cost of supporting a wife, Emsworth wanders into Kensington Gardens. Entranced by the flowers, he absent-mindedly picks a handful of tulips, arousing the wrath of a park-keeper. A police officer and crowd gather round, and Emsworth attempts to defend himself, but nobody believes a genuine Earl would dress so scruffily.

Just in time, Angus McAllister turns up and confirms Emsworth's identity; he is accompanied by Mr Donaldson, who tells Lord Emsworth that he should be supportive of his son. Learning that Donaldson is a wealthy man and plans not only to take Freddie far away but also to put him to work, Emsworth is delighted, and gives his blessing warmly, sending Freddie a message "not to hurry home".

Emsworth approaches McAllister humbly and offers to double his salary if he returns to the castle. He does, and soon afterwards the gargantuan Blandings Hope wins first prize.

== Publication history ==
1924 Strand illustration by Reginald Cleaver

"Custody of the Pumpkin" was published in The Saturday Evening Post on 29 November 1924, with illustrations by May Wilson Preston. In the Strand Magazine, "The Custody of the Pumpkin" was published in December 1924 and illustrated by Reginald Cleaver.

Some versions of "The Custody of the Pumpkin" contain references to Franklin D. Roosevelt and the New Deal. These additions were made prior to publication of the story in the collection Blandings Castle and Elsewhere in 1935.

The story was included in the 1983 book Short Stories, a collection of short stories by Wodehouse, selected and with an introduction by Christopher Falkus, published by the Folio Society, London. The book was illustrated by George Adamson.

"Custody of the Pumpkin" was included in the anthology Cream of the Jug: An Anthology of Humorous Stories, edited by Grant Martin Overton and published by Harper, New York in 1927. It was included in the tenth volume of the 1927 anthology World's 100 Best Short Stories in 10 Volumes, also edited by Overton, published by Funk & Wagnalls, New York. The 1942 anthology World's Great Short Stories: Masterpieces of American, English and Continental Literature, edited by Morris Edmund Speare and published by World, New York, included the story. The story was included in the anthology Modern Tales of Humour, edited by Leonard Roe, published by Hamish Hamilton, London, in 1960 and in a new edition by Oak Tree Books, London, in 1961.

== Adaptations ==
The story was adapted for television by the BBC as the second episode of the first series of The World of Wodehouse in 1967, under the title "The Great Pumpkin Crisis".

In 1985, the story was adapted as a radio drama, with the same title, as part of the Blandings radio series.

The story was adapted as "Custody of the Pumpkin", the last episode of the 2013–2014 television series Blandings.

== See also ==
- List of short stories featuring Blandings, by publication date
- List of short stories and novels featuring Blandings, by collected edition
