= Lord Emsworth and the Girl Friend =

- Short story by P. G. Wodehouse
- Country: United Kingdom
- Language: English
- Genre: Comedy

Publication
- Publisher: Liberty (US); Strand (UK)
- Media type: Print (magazine)
- Publication date: 6 October 1928 (US); November 1928 (UK)

"Lord Emsworth and the Girl Friend" is a short story by P. G. Wodehouse, which first appeared in the United States in the 6 October 1928 issue of Liberty and in the United Kingdom in the November 1928 The Strand. Part of the Blandings Castle canon, it features the absent-minded peer Lord Emsworth, and was included in the collection Blandings Castle and Elsewhere (1935), although the story takes place sometime between the events of Leave it to Psmith (1923) and Summer Lightning (1929). Wodehouse intended to write a sequel, set 8 years after the events of this story.

== Plot summary ==
Despite glorious weather, Lord Emsworth is miserable; it is August Bank Holiday, which at Blandings means the annual Blandings Parva School Treat. The precious grounds are to be overrun with fairground rides, tea-tents and other amusements for the throngs (their numbers padded this year by a number of children visiting from London for the fresh air), and Emsworth is forced by his sister Connie to wear a stiff collar and a top hat, despite the warm weather and his strong protests.

On top of that, Glaswegian Head Gardener Angus McAllister is making noises on his pet hobby, the project to gravel the famous Yew Alley. Emsworth, fond of its mossy carpet, loathes the idea, but his sister is in favour, and stronger personalities overpower the elderly Earl all too easily.

Visiting Blandings Parva, to judge the flower displays in the gardens, Emsworth is frightened by a large dog, but he is rescued by a small girl named Gladys, one of the Fresh Air London children. They chat and become friends, especially when she reveals that, having been spotted picking flowers in the Castle grounds, she hit McAllister in the shin with a stone to stop him chasing her.

At the fête, Emsworth is uncomfortable as ever in his dress clothes, and dreading the speech he will have to make. In the tea-tent, his top hat is knocked off by a cleverly aimed rock cake, and Emsworth flees, taking refuge in an old shed. In there he finds Gladys, miserable; she has been put there by Connie, for stealing from the tea tent, but it emerges she was only stealing her own tea, going without to provide for her brother Ern, barred from the fête for biting Connie on the leg.

Delighted by this family, Emsworth takes Gladys into the house, and has Beach provide a hearty tea. Beach provides a feast to take back to Ern, and Gladys requests some flowers too. Emsworth hesitates, but cannot refuse her; as she is picking her flowers, McAllister rushes up in a fury, but his master, encouraged by Gladys' hand in his, stands up to the man, putting him in his place.

Connie approaches, demanding Emsworth return to make his speech; he refuses, saying he's going to put on some comfortable clothes and go and visit Ern.

== Publication history ==
"Lord Emsworth and the Girl Friend" was illustrated by James Montgomery Flagg in Liberty. It was illustrated by Reginald Cleaver in the Strand. The story was published in the Family Herald and Weekly Star (Montreal, Canada) on 12 June 1935.

The story was collected in Week-End Wodehouse (UK edition), published in May 1939 by Herbert Jenkins, London. It was included in Vintage Wodehouse, a 1978 collection edited by Richard Usborne and published by Barrie & Jenkins.

== Criticism ==
Rudyard Kipling is said to have called it "the perfect short story."

== Adaptations ==
Under the title "Lord Emsworth and the Little Friend", the story was adapted by C. E. Webber for BBC Television as a televised play in 1956. The cast included John Miller as Lord Emsworth, Joan Sanderson as Lady Constance, Margaret McCourt as Gladys, John Hall as Ern, Rufus Cruickshank as McAllister, and Raymond Rollett as Beach.

The story was adapted for television as an episode of The World of Wodehouse in 1967.

In 1985, it was adapted as the fifth episode of the Blandings radio series, under the title "Lord Emsworth and the Girlfriend".

The BBC adapted "Lord Emsworth and the Girl Friend" for television again in 2013, as the fifth episode in the series Blandings.

== See also ==
- List of Wodehouse's Blandings shorts
- Complete list of the Blandings stories
