= Pig-hoo-o-o-o-ey =

1927 short story by P. G. Wodehouse

"Pig-Hoo-o-o-o-ey"
- Short story by P. G. Wodehouse
- Country: United Kingdom
- Language: English
- Genre: Comedy

Publication
- Publisher: Liberty (US); Strand (UK)
- Media type: Print (Magazine)
- Publication date: 9 July 1927 (US); August 1927 (UK)

"Pig-Hoo-o-o-o-ey" is a short story by P. G. Wodehouse, which first appeared in the United States in the 9 July 1927 issue of Liberty, and in the United Kingdom in the August 1927 Strand. Part of the Blandings Castle canon, it features the absent-minded peer Lord Emsworth, and was included in the collection Blandings Castle and Elsewhere (1935), although the story takes place sometime between the events of Leave It to Psmith (1923) and Summer Lightning (1929).

== Plot summary ==
Lord Emsworth, keen that his fat pig, the Empress of Blandings, should win the 87th annual Shropshire Agricultural Show, is distraught when his pigman, Wellbeloved, is sent to prison for fourteen days for being drunk and disorderly in a Market Blandings inn.

The pig immediately goes off her feed, and with the vet baffled, Emsworth is in no state to listen to his sister Connie's bleatings about his niece Angela breaking off her engagement from Lord Heacham in favour of the quite unsuitable James Belford, who Emsworth himself always liked, being a friend of the lad's father, a local parson.

Emsworth, still distracted about his pig, is sent to London to have stern words with Belford; dining with him at the Senior Conservative Club, conversation turns to pigs, and Belford, having spent two years on a Nebraska farm, proceeds to impress Emsworth with his knowledge of pig-calls of all states. He teaches Emsworth the master call, the "pig-hoo-o-o-o-ey" to which all pigs will respond, and Emsworth heads home happily.

Falling asleep on the train, Emsworth forgets the call, but while talking to Angela in the castle grounds, is reminded of it by the sound of Mrs Twemlow's gramophone. He, Beach and Angela all try the call on the Empress, but to no avail; just when all looks black, Belford arrives, shows them how the call should really sound, and to everyone's delight the Empress tucks heartily into her food. She goes on, of course, to win the contest.

== Publication history ==
The story was illustrated by Wallace Morgan in Liberty, and by Reginald Cleaver in the Strand. It was printed in the Family Herald and Weekly Star (Montreal) on 5 June 1935 and in the Star Weekly (Toronto) on 8 June 1935, both with illustrations by James H. Hammon.

The story was included in the 1939 collection The Week-End Wodehouse (US edition), published by Doubleday, Doran & Co., New York. It was included in the 1960 collection The Most of P. G. Wodehouse, published by Simon and Schuster, New York. The 1978 collection Vintage Wodehouse, edited by Richard Usborne and published by Barrie & Jenkins, included the story. It was included in the 1983 book Short Stories, a collection of Wodehouse stories selected and with an introduction by Christopher Falkus, published by the Folio Society, London, with illustrations by George Adamson. The 1985 collection A Wodehouse Bestiary, edited by D. R. Bensen and published by Ticknor & Fields, New York, featured the story.

It was included in the 1940 anthology New Frontiers, edited by Thomas Henry Briggs and others, published by Houghton, New York. The story was also included in the 1962 anthology The Harrap Book of Humorous Prose, edited by Michael Davis and published by Harrap, London.

== Adaptations ==
=== Radio ===
- The story was adapted into a radio drama by Anne Pendleton and John Cheatle, first broadcast by the BBC Home Service on 7 September 1940. It featured Frederick Lloyd as Lord Emsworth, Gladys Young as Lady Constance, Edana Romney as Angela, Ralph Truman as Beach, Ronald Simpson as Lord Heacham, and Ivan Samson as James Belford.
- In 1985, the story was adapted as an episode of the radio series Blandings.

=== Television ===
- The story was adapted as a play for television by Rex Tucker, broadcast by BBC Television in 1954, with John Miller as Lord Emsworth, Joan Sanderson as Lady Constance, Daphne Grey as Angela, Felix Felton as Beach, and Derek Aylward as James Belford. The play was also televised in 1956, with Miller, Sanderson, and Aylward reprising their roles. Brenda Dean portrayed Angela and Raymond Rollett portrayed Beach.
- A second adaptation for television (under the title "Pig Hoo-oo-ey!") was broadcast by the BBC in the series Blandings Castle, the first series of The World of Wodehouse.
- The BBC adapted "Pig-hoo-o-o-o-ey" for television again in 2013, as the first episode of Blandings.

== See also ==
- List of Wodehouse's Blandings shorts
- Complete list of the Blandings stories
