= Blandings Castle =

Fictional location in the works of P. G. Wodehouse

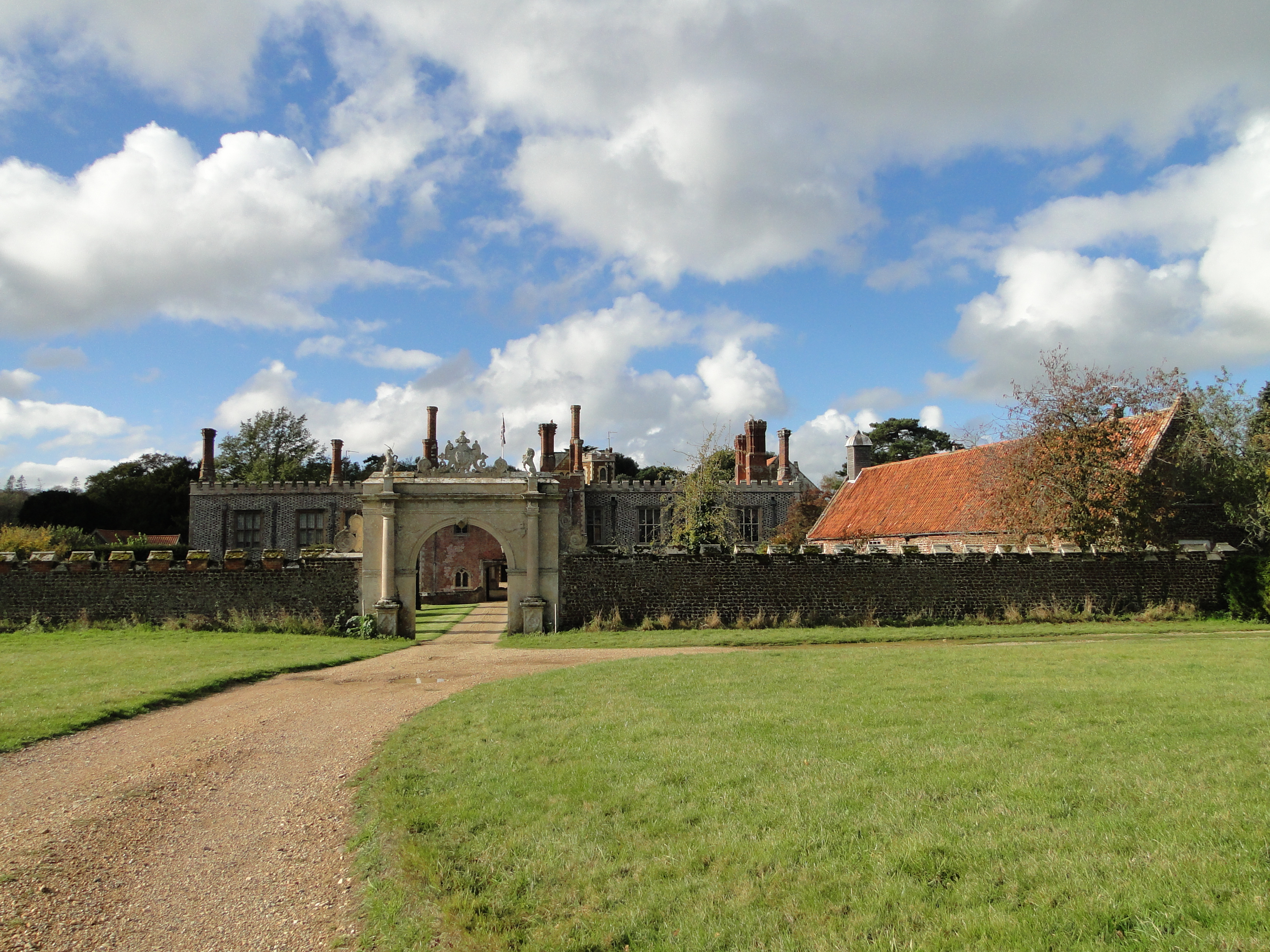
Hunstanton Hall, one of several stately homes on which Wodehouse might have modeled Blandings Castle

Blandings Castle is a recurring fictional location in the stories of British comic writer P. G. Wodehouse, being the seat of Lord Emsworth and the setting for numerous tales and adventures. The stories were written between 1915 and 1975.

The series of stories taking place at the castle, in its environs and involving its denizens have come to be known as the "Blandings books", or, in a phrase used by Wodehouse in his preface to the 1969 reprint of the first book, "the Blandings Castle Saga".

In a radio broadcast on 15 July 1961, Evelyn Waugh said: "The gardens of Blandings Castle are that original garden from which we are all exiled."

== The Castle ==
Blandings Castle, lying in the picturesque Vale of Blandings, Shropshire, England, is two miles (3.2 km) from the town of Market Blandings, home to at least nine pubs, most notably the Emsworth Arms.

The tiny hamlet of Blandings Parva lies directly outside the castle gates and the town of Much Matchingham, home to Matchingham Hall, the residence of Sir Gregory Parsloe-Parsloe, is also nearby.

The castle is a noble pile, of Early Tudor building ("its history is recorded in England's history books and Viollet-le-Duc has written of its architecture", according to Something Fresh). One of England's largest stately homes, it dominates the surrounding country, standing on a knoll of rising ground at the southern end of the celebrated Vale of Blandings; the Severn gleams in the distance. From its noble battlements, the Wrekin can be seen.

The famous moss-carpeted Yew Alley (subject to the devious gravelling schemes of Angus McAllister) leads to a small wood with a rough gamekeeper's cottage, which Psmith made use of, not to write poetry as he at first claimed, but to stash stolen jewellery. Another gamekeeper's cottage, in the West Wood, makes a pleasant home for the Empress of Blandings for a spell. The rose garden is another famous beauty spot, ideal for courting lovers. There is a lake, where Lord Emsworth often takes a brisk swim in the mornings.

The house has numerous guest rooms, many of which have not been used since Queen Elizabeth roamed the country. Of those still in use, the Garden Room is the finest, usually given to the most prestigious guest; it has a balcony outside its French windows, which can be easily accessed via a handy drainpipe.

The main library has a smaller library leading off it, and windows overlooking some flowerbeds; it is here that Lord Emsworth is often to be found on wet days, his nose deep in an improving tome of country lore, his favourite being Whiffle on The Care of the Pig.

=== Possible locations ===
There have been a number of attempts to identify a real building whose location Wodehouse might have used as the setting for the fictional Blandings Castle:

- In 1977, Richard Usborne included a report by railway historian Michael Cobb in an appendix to the unfinished Sunset at Blandings. Based on details of train journeys and travel times given in Wodehouse's stories, Cobb argued that Buildwas in Shropshire best fitted the description of Market Blandings, thus placing Blandings Castle at one of two locations nearby. However, in a parenthetical aside, he asked whether "anyone ha[d] considered that Blandings Castle was really Apley Park" (or Hall). Apley Park (or Hall) is less than 6 mi (9.7 km) from Buildwas.
- In 1986, Norman Murphy, in his In Search of Blandings, looked at a whole range of criteria based around architecture and landscape features. His main suggestions were Sudeley Castle, Gloucestershire for the castle itself, and Weston Park, Staffordshire for the gardens. The owners of Sudeley, also the resting place of Queen Katherine Parr, have since emphasised the Wodehouse connection.
- In 1999, Norman Murphy again suggested Hunstanton Hall in Norfolk, the home of the LeStrange family from 1137 to 1954, where Wodehouse visited in the 1920s, as inspiration for Blandings, its master, and "the real Empress of Blandings".
- In 2003, Dr Daryl Lloyd and Dr Ian Greatbatch (two researchers in the Department of Geography and Centre for Advanced Spatial Analysis, University College London) made use of a Geographic Information System to analyse a set of geographical criteria, such as a viewshed analysis of The Wrekin and drive time from Shrewsbury. Their final conclusion was that Apley Hall was the best suited location for fulfilling the geographical criteria.

== Residents and guests ==
=== The family ===
The master of Blandings is, nominally at least, Lord Emsworth. Clarence, the ninth Earl, is an amiably absent-minded old chap, who is charming because of his slow, relaxed lifestyle and the simple obsessions that make him oblivious to the absurd melodrama of his family, namely his home, gardens, pumpkins, and his champion pig, Empress of Blandings. He is never happier than when pottering about the grounds on a fine sunny day.

Lord Emsworth's ten sisters (all of whom look like the "daughter of a hundred earls", except for Hermione, who looks like a cook), his brother Galahad ("Gally"), his daughter Mildred, his sons Freddie and George, and his numerous nieces, nephews, and in-laws inhabit the castle from time to time. For the Threepwood family, and their friends, the castle is forever available for indefinite residence, and is occasionally used as a temporary prison—known as "Devil's Island" or "The Bastille"—for love-struck young men and ladies to calm down.

Emsworth's sister Ann plays the role of châtelaine when we first visit the Castle, in Something Fresh. Following her reign, Lady Constance Keeble usually acts as châtelaine until she marries American millionaire James Schoonmaker and spends most of her time in America. Another married sister, Hermione, takes over the duties when Constance is traveling, or otherwise unavailable. While all of Lord Emsworth's sisters are 'take-charge' types, Constance ("Connie") in particular has a very domineering and impatient temperament, as well as a cutting vocabulary; Clarence lives in dread of her occasional return visits to the Castle.

Lady Julia Fish (another sister) is "the iron hand beneath the leather glove", whose son Ronald Fish ("Ronnie") marries a chorus girl named Sue Brown, much to her displeasure. Sue is the daughter of the only woman whom Gally ever loved—Dolly Henderson—though Gally insists Sue is not Ronnie's cousin.

The other sisters (not all of whom are seen, as they are married and live elsewhere) are: Charlotte, Dora, Florence, Georgiana, Jane (deceased), and Diana, the only one that Gally likes (Sunset at Blandings). They have a third brother, who has died, called Lancelot.

=== The staff ===
Blandings's ever-present butler is Sebastian Beach, with eighteen years service at the castle under his ample belt, and its other domestic servants have at various times included Mrs Twemlow the housekeeper, an under-butler named Merridew, and a number of footmen, such as Charles, Thomas, Stokes, James and Alfred. The chauffeurs Slingsby and Alfred Voules drive the castle's stately Hispano-Suiza, or, in an emergency, the Albatross or the Antelope (Summer Lightning). Scottish head gardeners Thorne and Angus McAllister have tended the grounds, while George Cyril Wellbeloved, James Pirbright and the Amazonian Monica Simmons have each in turn taken care of Lord Emsworth's beloved prize pig, Empress of Blandings.

Emsworth has employed a series of secretaries, most notable among them Rupert Baxter, the highly efficient young man who never seems to be able to keep away from Blandings, despite Lord Emsworth's increasingly low opinion of his sanity. He was succeeded in the post by Ronald Psmith, and later by the likes of Hugo Carmody and Monty Bodkin. The castle's splendid library was catalogued, for the first time since 1885, by Eve Halliday.

=== Notable visitors ===
Many people pass through the doors of Blandings, including guests and friends of the family, prospective additions to the family, temporary staff, pig-lovers, day-trippers, detectives, crooks and of course impostors galore. (Almost every story that takes place at Blandings features at least one character gaining entry to the castle by means of pretending to be someone else, often at the instigation of Galahad or friend of the family Uncle Fred.) Among the most distinguished guests who visit are the grumpy Duke of Dunstable; leading brain-specialist Sir Roderick Glossop; publishing magnate Lord Tilbury; and Frederick Altamont Cornwallis Twistleton, the fifth Earl of Ickenham, known to all as Uncle Fred. Less salubrious guests have included Percy Pilbeam, head of the Argus Enquiry Agency, employed to locate the lost pig and recover Gally's manuscript of his memoirs.

== Books ==
Blandings Castle serves as the setting for eleven novels and nine short stories.

- Something Fresh (1915) — Also published under the title Something New.
- Leave it to Psmith (1923)
- Blandings Castle and Elsewhere (1935) – Six short stories of twelve, written from 1924 to 1931, occurring before the events of Summer Lightning:
  - "The Custody of the Pumpkin"
  - "Lord Emsworth Acts for the Best"
  - "Pig-hoo-o-o-o-ey"
  - "Company for Gertrude"
  - "The Go-getter"
  - "Lord Emsworth and the Girl Friend"
- Summer Lightning (1929)
- Heavy Weather (1933)
- Lord Emsworth and Others (1937) – One short story of nine:
  - "The Crime Wave at Blandings"
- Uncle Fred in the Springtime (1939)
- Full Moon (1947)
- Nothing Serious (1950) – One short story of ten:
  - "Birth of a Salesman" – a story featuring Lord Emsworth, but not actually set at Blandings
- Pigs Have Wings (1952)
- Service with a Smile (1961)
- Galahad at Blandings (1965)
- Plum Pie (1966) – One short story of nine (probably to be read before Service with a Smile):
  - "Sticky Wicket at Blandings"
- A Pelican at Blandings (1969)
- Sunset at Blandings (1977)

Wodehouse worked on Sunset at Blandings until his death, writing even in his hospital bed. It was unfinished and untitled when he died, and was subsequently edited (by Richard Usborne) and released in its incomplete form with extensive notes on the content.

All nine Blandings short stories were collected together in one volume entitled Lord Emsworth Acts for the Best in 1992.

The Folio Society published a six volume set The Best of Blandings consisting of Summer Lightning, Heavy Weather, Uncle Fred in the Springtime, Full Moon, Pigs Have Wings, and Service with a Smile.

== Adaptations ==
=== Television ===
- Televised plays adapted from the short stories "Pig-hoo-o-o-o-ey" and "Lord Emsworth and the Girl Friend" aired in 1954 and 1956 on BBC Television.
- The Castle and its inhabitants were the subject of six half-hour adaptations under the title Blandings Castle, made by the BBC (also known as The World of Wodehouse series). Adapted from some of the shorts in Blandings Castle and Elsewhere and "The Crime Wave at Blandings", they were broadcast in 1967 and starred Ralph Richardson as Lord Emsworth, Meriel Forbes as Lady Constance, Stanley Holloway as Beach and Derek Nimmo as Freddie. Only extracts from one episode survive ("Lord Emsworth and the Girl Friend"), the series is lost.
- Two German television films based on the Blandings Castle stories were broadcast in West Germany. The first, Blut floss auf Blandings Castle, was broadcast in 1967. The second film, Der Lord und seine Königin, was broadcast in 1977 and was adapted from the play Oh, Clarence!.
- Cyril Luckham played Lord Emsworth and John Savident played Beach in the 1981 BBC television film Thank You, P. G. Wodehouse.
- In 1995, the BBC, with partners including WGBH Boston, adapted Heavy Weather into a 95-minute TV movie. It was first screened on Christmas Eve 1995 in the UK, and shown in the US by PBS on February 18, 1996. It starred Peter O'Toole as Lord Emsworth, Richard Briers as Gally, Roy Hudd as Beach, Samuel West as Monty Bodkin and Judy Parfitt as Lady Constance. It was directed by Jack Gold with a screenplay by Douglas Livingstone, and was generally well received by fans.
- BBC One produced a series of six episodes, called Blandings, starring Timothy Spall and Jennifer Saunders which premiered in January 2013. A second series of seven episodes aired in February 2014.

=== Film ===
- Clive Currie portrayed Lord Emsworth and Toni Edgar-Bruce portrayed Lady Constance in the film Leave It to Me (1933), based on the novel Leave It to Psmith.
- Horace Hodges played Lord Emsworth in the 1933 silent film Summer Lightning, based on the novel Summer Lightning.
- The 1938 Swedish film Thunder and Lightning (Swedish title: Blixt och dunder) was adapted from the novel Summer Lightning.

=== Stage ===
- The novel Leave It to Psmith was adapted as a play by Wodehouse and Ian Hay. The play premiered in 1930. Clive Currie portrayed the Earl of Middlewick, the play's version of Lord Emsworth, and Basil Foster played Psmith.
- The play Oh, Clarence!, a comedy in two acts, was adapted by John Chapman from the Blandings Castle stories. The play opened at the Manchester Opera House on 20 July 1968, and subsequently at the Lyric Theatre, London, on 28 August 1968. The cast included Naunton Wayne as Lord Emsworth, Agnes Lauchlan as Lady Constance, and James Hayter as Beach.
- Giles Havergal adapted Summer Lightning as a play in 1992.

=== Radio ===
- The short story "The Crime Wave at Blandings" was adapted for radio in 1939.
- Dramatisations of two of the short stories, "Lord Emsworth Acts for the Best" and "Pig-hoo-o-o-o-ey", were broadcast in 1940. The adaptations aired on the BBC Home Service.
- Leave It to Psmith was adapted for radio in 1981 by Michael Bakewell.
- Giles Havergal adapted Full Moon for radio in 1999.
- Between 1985 and 1992, BBC Radio 4 broadcast several adaptations in the Blandings radio series, starring Richard Vernon as Emsworth and Ian Carmichael as Galahad.
- Archie Scottney adapted BBC radio dramatisations of Something Fresh (2009), Summer Lightning (2010), Uncle Fred in the Springtime (2012), and Leave it to Psmith (2020), with Martin Jarvis as Lord Emsworth, and Patricia Hodge as Lady Constance in all except Something Fresh.
- Many of the stories and novels are available as audiobooks, including an abridged series narrated by Martin Jarvis.

=== Literature ===
- Lord Emsworth's Annotated Whiffle: The Care of the Pig by James Hogg purports to be an abridged version of Lord Emsworth's annotated copy of The Care of the Pig by fictional author Augustus Whiffle. It was published by Michael Joseph Ltd. in 1991 and by Heinemann Educational Books in 1992.
- The Reminiscences of the Hon. Galahad Threepwood by N. T. P. Murphy is meant to be the memoirs of Galahad Threepwood mentioned in Wodehouse's novels Summer Lightning and Heavy Weather. It was published by Porpoise Books in 1993. Murphy also wrote academic books about Wodehouse's works, including In Search of Blandings.
- The short story "The Case of the Starving Swine" by Gayle Lange Puhl adds Sherlock Holmes to the Blandings short story "Pig-hoo-o-o-o-ey". The story was printed in Puhl's book Sherlock Holmes and the Folk Tale Mysteries - Volume 1, published in 2015 by MX Publishing.

== See also ==
- A categorized list of characters appearing in the Blandings stories
