= Company for Gertrude =

1928 short story by P. G. Wodehouse

- Short story by P. G. Wodehouse
- Country: United Kingdom
- Language: English
- Genre: Comedy

Publication
- Publisher: Strand Magazine (UK); Cosmopolitan (US)
- Media type: Print (magazine)
- Publication date: September 1928 (UK); October 1928 (US)

"Company for Gertrude" is a short story by P. G. Wodehouse, which first appeared in the United Kingdom in September 1928 in Strand, and in the United States in October 1928 in Cosmopolitan. Part of the Blandings Castle canon, it features the absent-minded peer Lord Emsworth, and was included in the collection Blandings Castle and Elsewhere (1935), though the story takes place sometime between the events of Leave it to Psmith (1923) and Summer Lightning (1929).

== Plot ==
Lord Emsworth's world is far from ideal – not only has his neighbour Sir Gregory Parsloe-Parsloe stolen his pigman Wellbeloved, but his niece Gertrude is imprisoned in the house, mooning miserably about the place and, worse still, trying to be "helpful" by tidying his study.

Meanwhile, Freddie Threepwood, back in England to promote his father-in-law Mr Donaldson's "Dog-Joy" biscuits, has just been turned down by his dog-loving Aunt Georgiana, Gertrude's mother, when he runs into his old Oxford pal Beefy Bingham. Bingham, Freddie learns, is in love with cousin Gertrude, but as he is not well-off, the family have closed ranks and sent Gertrude away to Blandings.

Inspired by a Super-film he has seen, Freddie sends Bingham down to the castle, under the guise of a Mr "Popjoy" (based on Lord Emsworth's mishearing of the dog biscuits Freddie is selling), tasked with ingratiating himself with the Earl. Emsworth is at first pleased to see Gertrude less dour, and charmed by his guest's diffidence and helpful ways, but soon finds himself smothered – Bingham is overdoing the ingratiating. Emsworth even begins to question the man's sanity, when he wakes in the night to find the fellow blowing kisses up at his window.

When Bingham tries to help Emsworth off a ladder and knocks him to the ground, he hopes to remedy the other's ills (and anger) with a bottle of balm; sadly however, he buys a product designed for horses, which causes his Lordship considerable pain. When he sees Emsworth singing during his morning swim, he mistakes the awful noise for cries for help, and dashes in to save the aging peer, only to be thanked with a stiff punch in the face.

Freddie reveals to Emsworth that Popjoy is in fact Bingham, hopeful of one of the many livings in Emsworth's gift. When Emsworth realises that he can inflict the man on his enemy Parsloe-Parsloe, he does not hesitate from granting him the job.

== Publication history ==
The story was illustrated by Reginald Cleaver in the Strand. It was illustrated by O. F. Howard in Cosmopolitan.

"Company for Gertrude" was included in the collection The World of Wodehouse Clergy, published in June 1984 by Hutchinson, London.

== Adaptations ==
The story was adapted for television by the BBC and broadcast in March 1967 as an episode of The World of Wodehouse, titled "Lord Emsworth and the Company for Gertrude".

"Company for Gertrude" was adapted for radio in February 1985, as part of the Blandings radio series.

The BBC adapted "Company for Gertrude" for television again in 2013, as the third episode of the series Blandings. This adaptation adds a sub-plot in which Freddie marries a Portuguese woman named Paquita, and tries to keep his marriage a secret from Lady Constance.

== See also ==
- List of Wodehouse's Blandings shorts
- Complete list of the Blandings stories
