= Something Fresh =

1915 novel by P. G. Wodehouse

- First US edition
- Author: P. G. Wodehouse
- Original title: Something Fresh
- Language: English
- Genre: Comic novel
- Publisher: Methuen; D. Appleton & Company
- Publication date: 16 September 1915
- Publication place: United Kingdom
- Media type: Print (hard~ & paperback)
- Pages: 190
- Followed by: Leave it to Psmith

Something Fresh is a novel by P. G. Wodehouse, first published as Something New in the United States, by D. Appleton & Company on 3 September 1915. It was published in the United Kingdom as Something Fresh by Methuen & Co. on 16 September 1915. There are a number of differences between the American and British versions, but essentially, it is the same book. The novel introduces Lord Emsworth of Blandings Castle, whose home and family reappear in many of Wodehouse's later short stories and novels.

The story is a comic caricature of English aristocratic life and the American aristocracy of wealth. The servants of the English country house, who follow a very elaborate hierarchy and take meals at many different social levels, mimic their betters, "and in so doing make their betters look absurd".

== Plot summary ==
Joan Valentine and Ashe Marson, 1915 illustration by F. R. Gruger in The Saturday Evening Post

Ashe Marson and his fellow lodger Joan Valentine discover that they both work as writers for the Mammoth Publishing Company. Joan urges Ashe to overcome his discontentment and take a fresh direction in life.

Meanwhile, Freddie Threepwood, younger son of the Earl of Emsworth, is engaged to marry Aline Peters, the daughter of American millionaire J. Preston Peters. Freddie pays a visit to a shady fixer, R. Jones, hoping to recover letters he once sent to a certain chorus girl, feeling they might be used to make a breach of promise case against him. His father later calls on Aline's father to view his collection of scarabs and absent-mindedly puts Mr Peters' prize exhibit in his pocket. Though Peters suspects the Earl, he cannot confront him for fear of endangering his daughter's marriage.

Aline is being pursued by George Emerson, a Hong Kong police officer, who wishes to marry her. Having befriended Freddie Threepwood, George has been invited to Blandings Castle, the family home, at the same time that Aline and her father are paying a visit. R. Jones finds the address of Freddie's ex-sweetheart, Joan Valentine, who tells him she has long since destroyed any letters she may have had from Freddie. As Jones is leaving, Aline, a former school friend of Joan, arrives on a visit, and the suspicious Jones listens at the door. Hearing that Aline's father is offering £1,000 to anybody who can retrieve his scarab, Joan decides that she will go herself to Blandings, posing as Aline's maid, so as to recover the scarab and scoop the reward. Acting separately, Ashe answers a newspaper advert and is engaged as his valet by Mr. Peters, who is looking for somebody to steal back the scarab during his visit to Blandings.

Ashe informs Joan about this as they both take the train from London. During the trip Joan warns Ashe of the complicated system of etiquette observed among servants of a large house. She hopes this will persuade him to give up his quest and remove himself as her competitor. After their arrival, Ashe is terrified to be interviewed by the butler, Beach, and has to listen to a recital of his troubles with his feet and his stomach. Mr Peters also has stomach trouble and Ashe threatens him with non-cooperation unless he takes some exercise and stops smoking cigars.

At night, Ashe and Joan are both trying to get at the scarab when Lord Emsworth's watchful secretary, Rupert Baxter, nearly catches them. Next morning, Ashe and Joan decide to become allies and, after flipping a coin, agree to take turns at stealing the scarab. Since Aline is following the same reduced diet as her father, George steals downstairs to prepare her a midnight feast and collides with Ashe in the dark hall. They start a noisy fight but escape after the suspicious Baxter trips over them and is found surrounded by food and broken china by the time the lights are turned on. He is blamed for waking everyone and roundly criticised by Lord Emsworth for going in search of food in the middle of the night.

The next night is Joan's turn to make her attempt, but she finds the scarab has already gone. Putting together clues, she and Ashe discover that Freddie needs money to pay R. Jones, who is pretending that Joan is demanding it for the return of his letters. But Freddie is an admirer of the detective tales that Ashe writes and decides to trust him, confessing to the theft and returning the scarab. As Ashe leaves, Lord Emsworth arrives to announce that Aline has eloped on the train to London with George Emerson, who has been recalled to Hong Kong. Freddie is more relieved than hurt at this revelation.

When Ashe returns the scarab, Mr Peters offers to take Ashe back to America as his personal trainer in reward for the improvement in his health. Ashe hesitates long enough to ask Joan to marry him, and she admits she has been grieving at what seems to be the end of their partnership; as a result, a scullery maid looking out of the window has her dull life enriched as she sees them kissing.

== Background ==
As a young boy in Victorian England, Wodehouse was taken on social calls with his aunts to great houses and often had tea in the Servants' Hall, where he learned about the servants' hierarchy and etiquette. These observations were incorporated into Something Fresh. Before Wodehouse wrote the novel, his uncle Walter Meredith Deane and later his eldest brother Philip Peveril had served as second-in-command of the Hong Kong police force, like George Emerson in the novel.

== Publication history ==
Lord Emsworth and J. Preston Peters, 1915 illustration by F. R. Gruger

Wodehouse converted pounds sterling into dollars in the story for the American readers of The Saturday Evening Post when it was first serialised between 26 June and 14 August 1915. The title "Something New" was used in America instead of "Something Fresh" because "fresh" has a meaning synonymous with "impertinent" in America. For it Wodehouse received a fee of $3,500, more than for any previous work. The serial in The Saturday Evening Post included illustrations by F. R. Gruger.

The book is described, in a new preface added in 1969, as the start of "the Blandings Castle Saga". Into this scenario many new elements were to be introduced over the years, but there was also one notable omission. This was Lord Emsworth's sister Lady Ann Warblington, who is mentioned in Something Fresh as subject to headaches and largely confined to her room, never to reappear in a Blandings novel again.

Something Fresh was published in the 1979 collection of Blandings novels Life at Blandings, along with Summer Lightning and Heavy Weather.

== Adaptations ==
The story was adapted in 2009 by Archie Scottney as a radio drama for BBC Radio 4's Classic Serial series. The cast included Ian Ogilvy as the narrator (credited as playing the role of "Wodehouse"), Ioan Gruffudd as Ashe Marson, Helen McCrory as Joan Valentine, Martin Jarvis as Lord Emsworth, Hector Elizondo as J. Preston Peters, Andrea Bowen as Aline Peters, and James Frain as George Emerson.

== See also ==
- Complete list of the Blandings books
