= Richard Usborne =

Journalist and author (1910–2006)

- Born: Richard Alexander Usborne; 16 May 1910; Simla, India
- Died: 21 March 2006 (aged 95); London
- Education: Balliol College, Oxford
- Occupations: Advertising executive, journalist, schoolmaster editor, author
- Known for: Scholar of P. G. Wodehouse
- Spouses: Monica Stuart MacArthur; (1938–1986, her death)
- Children: 2

Richard Alexander Usborne (16 May 1910 – 21 March 2006) was a journalist, advertising executive, schoolmaster and author. After the publication of his book Wodehouse at Work in 1961 he became regarded as the leading authority on the works of P. G. Wodehouse. He published or contributed to nine more books on the subject. He adapted eight Wodehouse novels and several other of the author's works for broadcast on BBC radio between 1979 and 1996.

== Biography ==
=== Early years ===
Richard Usborne was born on 16 May 1910 at Simla, in British India, the son of Charles Frederick Usborne, a member of the Indian Civil Service, and his wife Janet Muriel, née Lefroy. He was educated in England at Summer Fields Preparatory school, Charterhouse School and then Balliol College, Oxford, where he was a prominent sportsman, competing in association football and squash rackets. He graduated BA (Literae humaniores) in 1932.

Usborne failed to enter the Indian Civil Service because of a heart murmur, and became a schoolmaster for a while. From 1933 to 1936 he worked in advertising agencies, and in 1936, together with three friends, he invested in a listings magazine, London Week, later called What's On. As part-owner and editor, Usborne came up with the novel idea of a restaurant column. When he described a West End restaurant, the Dieu Donné, as the sort of place where you would say nothing if you saw your wife because she would want to know why you were there too, the owner of the restaurant successful sued for libel. Usborne abandoned publishing and moved back into advertising, working for the large London Press Exchange. In 1938 he married Monica, daughter of Archibald Stuart MacArthur of Wagon Mound, New Mexico; they had one son and one daughter.

=== Second World War and later life ===
From the outbreak of war in 1939 until 1941 Usborne worked for the BBC Monitoring Service. In 1941 he was recruited by the Special Operations Executive and began work in Beirut, spreading pro-Allied propaganda. He was later recalled home and spent the remainder of the war working for the Political Warfare Executive. He left the army with the rank of major. In 1946–1948 he had a regular slot as a broadcaster on BBC radio, reviewing books, mostly fiction.

In 1948 Usborne became assistant editor of the Strand Magazine, then edited by Macdonald Hastings. The Strand was known for first publishing the Sherlock Holmes stories of Arthur Conan Doyle and later the stories of P. G. Wodehouse. Usborne was remembered for giving "warm, cheerful and avuncular encouragement to young and inexperienced budding writers". By the late 1940s the magazine was suffering from falling circulation and rising costs; the final issue was published in March 1950. Usborne then worked on the Leader Magazine before returning to teaching as a master at St Paul's School, where, one pupil recalled, he "taught my youthful generation how to read poetry, to learn to love it and even to write it". His final career move took him back to advertising; he became a director of the advertising company Graham and Gillies, where he remained until he retired in 1970. From 1974 to 1981 he was a Custodian for the National Trust.

After the death of his wife in 1986 Usborne became a Brother (a resident pensioner) at the London Charterhouse. He died in London on 21 March 2006, aged 95.

== Literary career ==
=== Punch ===
In addition to his day-jobs, Usborne wrote verse and prose for various publications, including Punch, The Guardian, The Times and The Times Literary Supplement. In a 1941 Punch article, "Not in the South", he propounded what later became known as the "Canterbury Block", a ploy for upstaging experts. This was subsequently incorporated by Stephen Potter in Lifemanship (1950). (Note: In Usborne's original: "She said, if I remember, that the Russian people were fine peasant stock, gradually receiving the mass education of a new and exciting world experiment. To which I answered, 'Would you say that of the South of Russia, Freda?' That gravelled her, and she only shoved her oar in with circumspection after that." Potter's example of the ploy was against a self-regarding "expert", who has just returned from a visit to Florence and remarks, "And I was glad to see with my own eyes that this Left-wing Catholicism is definitely on the increase in Tuscany"; to which the "lifeman" replies with the offputting interjection, "Yes, but not in the South.") Usborne continued to write for Punch during the succeeding decades; his final contribution was a 90th-birthday tribute to P. G. Wodehouse, published in October 1971.

=== Clubland Heroes ===
In 1952 Usborne wrote his first book Clubland Heroes, published in 1953 with revised editions in 1975 and 1983. This work sought to reappraise the adventure stories of the British authors Dornford Yates, Sapper, and John Buchan. Usborne had first read the stories during childhood illnesses, but had retained an affection for them into adulthood. Despite this, he was not blind to the flaws in these authors' works, describing female characters as "cardboard" and noting that McNeile was "wonderfully forgetful", with characters dead in one book, but being alive in the next. Clubland Heroes was well received. E. V. Knox praised "the delightfully satirical way" in which Usborne summed up the characters and exploits of the heroes, Philip Toynbee called the book "a jeu d'esprit that will give great pleasure … a fine piece of gentle but sustained irony", and Punch found it "enjoyable and absorbing to read besides being penetrating criticism".

=== Wodehouse ===
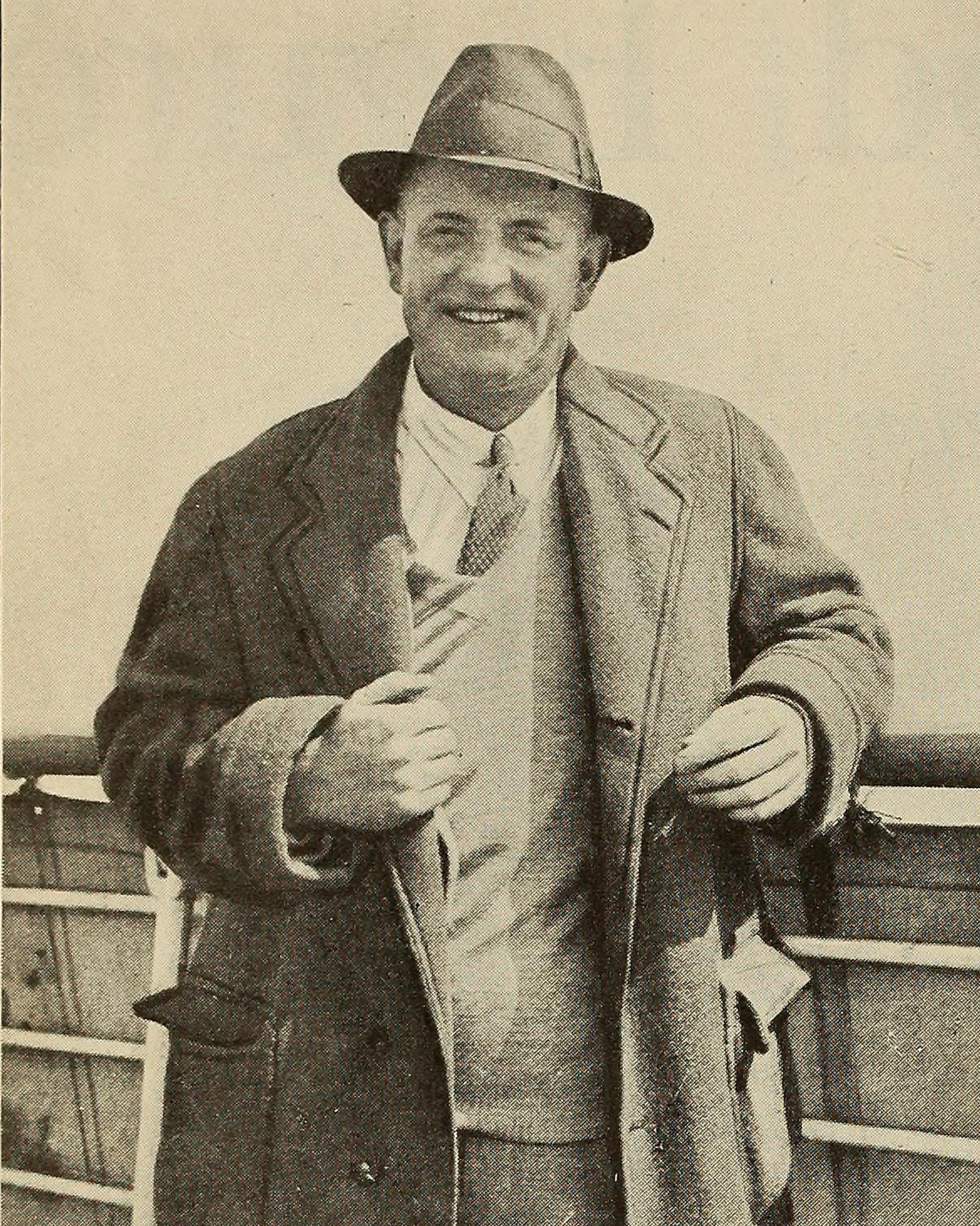
P. G. Wodehouse

Clubland Heroes brought Usborne to the attention of P. G. Wodehouse, who liked the book so much that he approved the suggestion that Usborne should write a study of his books, in time for his 80th birthday in 1961. Work began in 1958. The result was Wodehouse at Work (1961). Wodehouse cooperated with Usborne in the preparation of the book, although their contact was almost entirely by correspondence – rather more correspondence than Wodehouse found congenial. They met only once, when Usborne visited Wodehouse and his wife Ethel at their home on Long Island, New York, in 1971 (the year in which Wodehouse reached the age of ninety).

Although Wodehouse praised the book when it was published, he found its author – whom he called "a certain learned Usborne" – too inclined to bring in biographical details rather than concentrating on the works as agreed. He was horrified at a proposed chapter dealing with his broadcasts from Berlin in 1941, and it did not appear in the finished book. When he received Usborne's draft he removed and destroyed a 20,000-word chapter on the subject. Even so far as study of his books was concerned, he found it unsettling to have his fiction subjected to extensive critical analysis. He thought Usborne paid too much attention to the school stories from Wodehouse's very early career, when, in his words, "I was hardly articulate".

In 1973 Usborne contributed to Homage to P. G. Wodehouse, a tribute edited by Thelma Cazalet-Keir, sister-in-law of Wodehouse's late stepdaughter Leonora. (Note: Other contributors included John Betjeman, Guy Bolton, Basil Boothroyd, Lord David Cecil, Claude Cockburn, William Douglas-Home, Richard Ingrams, Henry Longhurst, Compton Mackenzie and Auberon Waugh.) After Wodehouse's death in 1975 Usborne revised Wodehouse at Work to take account of the twelve new Wodehouse books that had appeared since 1961. Wodehouse at Work to the End was published in 1976. It consists, like its predecessor, of ten main sections – an introductory biographical chapter setting Wodehouse and his works in context, and chapters on the school stories; Psmith; Ukridge; Lord Emsworth and Blandings; Uncle Fred; the light novels; the short stories; Bertie Wooster; and Jeeves. Between the chapters are pages of "Images" – Usborne's favourite comic images from Wodehouse's stories. (Note: Examples include: "The stationmaster's whiskers are of a Victorian bushiness and give the impression of having been grown under glass"; "He felt like a man who, chasing rainbows, had had one of them suddenly turn round and bite him in the leg"; "Breakfast had been prepared by the kitchen maid, an indifferent performer who had used the scorched earth policy on the bacon again"; "It is never difficult to distinguish between a Scotsman with a grievance and a ray of sunshine", "Bingo swayed like a jelly in a high wind … His whole aspect was that of a man who has unexpectedly been struck by lightning".) As with the 1961 edition, reviews were excellent. The Guardian called it a classic, and commented:

No one has surveyed the Wodehouse universe more rewardingly than Richard Usborne … He has the right appreciative voice, neither heavily light-hearted nor briskly solemn. Wodehouse at Work to the End is so full of Wodehouse people and simple, sensible speculation that it's almost as delightful to read as a Wodehouse novel.

Usborne published five more books focusing on Wodehouse. Vintage Wodehouse (1977) is an anthology which, among many other items, includes extracts from some of the Berlin broadcasts. Wodehouse Nuggets (1983) is a collection of Wodehouse quotations and vignettes, with illustrations from the Strand Magazine. The Penguin Wodehouse Companion (1988) includes a biography, synopses of all the novels and pen-portraits of the major characters. After Hours with P. G. Wodehouse (1991) is another anthology of the author's writings. Plum Sauce (2002) is an illustrated companion that draws on much of Usborne's earlier material. Reviewing it, The Philadelphia Inquirer called Usborne "the world's leading Wodehouse expert" and recommended readers to "grab" the book.

Usborne annotated Wodehouse's final, unfinished novel, which was published as Sunset at Blandings in 1977, noting that "if the going had remained good Sunset at Blandings might, under another title, have been ready for Christmas 1976". (Note: Usborne's invitation to the cartographer and Bradshaw expert Michael Cobb to produce an appendix for Sunset at Blandings on what the information about train timetables in Wodehouse's novels suggested about the location of Blandings Castle led to Cobb's study of Britain's railways that culminated in The Railways of Great Britain: A Historical Atlas (2004).) The text of an address given by Usborne at the opening of the P. G. Wodehouse Corner in the library of Dulwich College in October 1977 was published as Dr Sir Pelham Wodehouse, Old Boy in 1978. In 1983 Usborne was one of the contributors to Three Talks and a Few Words at a Festive Occasion, which contains the texts of talks on Wodehouse given by Usborne, Malcolm Muggeridge and William Douglas-Home in April 1982.

Wodehouse at Work to the End and Plum Sauce contain appendices about translations of Wodehouse into French. Examples of such vocabulary included pourvu de galette ("oofy"), déchiqueter ("to tear limb from limb"), and l'horrible drame de Steeple Bumpleigh ("the Steeple Bumpleigh horror").

Between 1979 and 1996 Usborne adapted some of Wodehouse's stories for broadcast on BBC Radio, beginning with a serialisation of Jeeves and the Feudal Spirit (1979), starring Michael Hordern as Jeeves and Richard Briers as Bertie Wooster; in 1985 Usborne's adaptations of seven Blandings short stories were broadcast and in 1987 he adapted the novel Summer Lightning, followed by Heavy Weather (1988), Pigs Have Wings (1989) and Galahad at Blandings starring Richard Vernon as Lord Emsworth and Ian Carmichael as Galahad Threepwood. Usborne's last radio dramatisation was Uncle Dynamite (1996) starring Briers as Lord Ickenham. Usborne also prepared abridgements for single narrator of The Luck of the Bodkins (1981), Bring On the Girls! (1981) and Quick Service (1994).

=== Other ===
Usborne's only non-Wodehouse book after the publication of Wodehouse at Work was A Century of Summer Fields (1964), "a collection of tributes, reminiscences and other items, by old boys, masters, friends and critics" (including a poem by C. Day Lewis) edited by Usborne at the request of the governors of the school. The Times called it "a model for prep school memoirs". Usborne contributed introductions to new editions of works by Dornford Yates (1984) and Sapper (2001).

== Notes, references and sources ==
=== Sources ===
- McCrum, Robert (2004). Wodehouse: A Life. London: Viking. ISBN 978-0-670-89692-9.
- Potter, Stephen (1957). Some Notes on Lifemanship. London: Rupert Hart-Davis. OCLC 174892562.
- Ratcliffe, Sophie (2011). Wodehouse: A Life in Letters. London: Hutchinson. ISBN 978-0-09-179634-1.
- Usborne, Richard (1978) [1976]. Wodehouse at Work to the End. London: Penguin. ISBN 978-0-14-004564-2.
- Usborne, Richard (1983) [1953]. Clubland Heroes: A Nostalgic Study of Some Recurrent Characters in the Romantic Fiction of Dornford Yates, John Buchan and Sapper. London: Hutchinson. ISBN 978-0-09-152821-8.
- Wodehouse, P. G. (1977). Sunset at Blandings. London: Hutchinson. ISBN 978-0-09-173882-2.
