= Lord Emsworth Acts for the Best =

- Short story by P. G. Wodehouse
- Country: United Kingdom
- Language: English
- Genre: Comedy

Publication
- Publisher: Strand Magazine (UK); Liberty (US)
- Publication date: June 1926 (UK); 5 June 1926 (US)

"Lord Emsworth Acts for the Best" is a short story by P. G. Wodehouse, which first appeared in the United Kingdom in the June 1926 Strand Magazine, and in the United States in the 5 June 1926 issue of Liberty. Part of the Blandings Castle canon, it features the absent-minded peer Lord Emsworth, and was included in the collection Blandings Castle and Elsewhere (1935), although the story takes place sometime between the events of Leave it to Psmith (1923) and Summer Lightning (1929).

== Plot ==
Beach, long-serving butler at Blandings, is considering handing in his notice after 18 years, unable to bear the shame of his master Lord Emsworth's rather disreputable new beard. His Lordship himself, unaware of these ructions below stairs, is worried by a telegram from his younger son Freddie, who is back in London from America.

Visiting Freddie, Emsworth learns that the boy has fallen out with his wife Aggie; having written a scenario for Hollywood to impress her, he tried to persuade a prominent starlet to promote it for him; however, he is seen dining with the girl by Jane Yorke, a friend of his wife. Yorke tells Aggie she has seen Freddie with another girl, and she promptly leaves him.

Freddie tries to persuade his father to plead with her on his behalf, convinced by his movie knowledge that an appeal from a white-haired old father never fails, but Emsworth refuses. Later, however, realising the danger of Freddie returning to Blandings if his marriage is not patched up, he relents, and pays a call at the lady's hotel.

Finding the door to her room open, he potters vaguely in, and is chased into the bedroom by a small yapping dog, only to find she is in the bath. Her friend Jane Yorke holds him up with a gun, believing him to be a burglar, and while he is trying to explain himself, and Freddie, Freddie himself enters disguised as an old man with a white beard.

Seeing a cable from Hollywood accepting his scenario, Aggie believes Freddie's story and forgives him, to Jane's disgust. Jane is ejected, and Emsworth, on hearing that he looks like Freddie in his false beard, decides to shave off his own, much to Beach's relief.

== Publication history ==
"Lord Emsworth Acts for the Best" was published in the Strand in June 1926, with illustrations by Reginald Cleaver. It was published in Liberty on 5 June 1926, with illustrations by Wallace Morgan. On 29 May 1935, the story was published in the Family Herald and Weekly Star (Montreal, Canada), illustrated by James H. Hammon.

The story lends its title to a complete collection of Wodehouse's Blandings shorts, published by Penguin in 1992, with an introduction by Frank Muir (part of the Penguin Twentieth Century Classics series).

== Adaptations ==
In December 1940, a radio drama based on the story aired on the BBC Home Service. Adapted and produced by John Cheatle, it featured Frederick Lloyd as Lord Emsworth, Ralph Truman as Beach, Dora Gregory as the housekeeper Mrs Twemlow, Carleton Hobbs as Frederick Threepwood, Lydia Sherwood as Mrs Threepwood, and Betty Hardy as Jane Yorke.

The story was adapted for television as the fourth episode of the first series of The World of Wodehouse in 1967.

In 1985, the story was adapted for radio as part of the Blandings radio series. The episode was titled "Lord Emsworth Grows a Beard".

The story was adapted into the fourth episode of the second series of the Blandings television series, also titled "Lord Emsworth Acts for the Best", which aired in March 2014.

== See also ==
- List of Wodehouse's Blandings shorts
- Complete list of the Blandings stories
