= Sunset at Blandings =

Unfinished novel by P. G. Wodehouse

- Front cover of the first edition
- Author: P. G. Wodehouse
- Illustrator: Ionicus
- Cover artist: Ionicus
- Series: Blandings Castle
- Publisher: Chatto & Windus
- Publication date: 17 November 1977
- Publication place: United Kingdom
- OCLC: 630815809

Sunset at Blandings is an unfinished novel by P. G. Wodehouse published in the United Kingdom by Chatto & Windus, London, on 17 November 1977 and in the United States by Simon & Schuster, New York, 19 September 1978. Wodehouse was working on the novel when he died in 1975. The book's first edition publisher, Chatto & Windus, gave the book its title.

== Characters ==
- Sir James Piper — England's Chancellor of the Exchequer
- Claude Duff — Sir James' junior secretary whose aunt is Dame Daphne Winkworth. His uncle is the Duff of Duff and Trotter, provision merchants
- Brenda Piper — Sir James' forceful spinster sister who rules him
- Lady Florence Moresby — One of the many domineering sisters of Lord Emsworth. Also widow of the rich American J.J. Underwood. Currently separated from her second husband, Kevin
- Clarence, 9th Earl of Emsworth — Wants to have the Empress's portrait painted
- (Vicky) Victoria Underwood — Florence's pretty step-daughter who studied Art in London, and falls in love with Jeff Bennison
- Sergeant E.B. Murchison — Scotland Yard detective who acts as bodyguard to Sir James
- Lady Diana Phipps — Another of Lord Emsworth's sisters, the only one Galahad likes. She is beautiful, the widow of Rollo, and Sir James was once in love with her
- (Gally) Galahad Threepwood — Clarence's younger brother, who used to be good friends with Sir James. Both were members of the Pelican Club
- Jno. Robinson — Taxi owner/driver in Market Blandings
- Sebastian Beach — Butler at the Castle who worked there for 18 years
- Empress of Blandings — 3 time Silver medal winning Berkshire sow
- Marilyn Poole — Lady Diana's maid
- (Bingo) Jeff Bennison — An impecunious artist in love with Vicky. Teaches drawing at a girls' school in Eastbourne owned by Dame Daphne Winkworth. Went to school with Claude Duff
- Dame Daphne Winkworth — Fires Jeff as a drawing teacher at her school
- Freddie Threepwood — Lord Emsworth's younger son, who works and lives in America. Comes to London to drum up trade for the English branch of Donaldson's Dog Joy
- Stiffy Bates (*)
- Messmore Breamworthy (*)
- Kevin Moresby (*)
- G. Ovens - Inn keeper at Market Blandings(*)

== Editorial history ==
Wodehouse was still working on the book when he died in 1975; the published version was edited by Richard Usborne, and includes Wodehouse's notes on the ending of the story.

In various pages of notes, Wodehouse wrote fifteen possible titles for the novel, including Lord Emsworth Entertains, Blandings Castle Fills Up, Gally to the Rescue, The Weird Old Buster, and All's Well at Blandings. He did not consider the title Sunset at Blandings, which was the title chosen by the company that published the book in 1977, Chatto & Windus. Usborne writes that the title is apt but would not have been chosen by Wodehouse himself since, according to Usborne, "Wodehouse would never have locked, even if only by suggestion, the great gates of the castle. He would have wanted it there, with its sun high in the sky, for another visit if the mood took him".

== Plot ==
The story is another tale set at Blandings Castle, filled as ever with romance and imposters. Galahad Threepwood uses his charm and wit to ensure his brother Clarence continues to lead a quiet and peaceful life.

== References and sources ==
Sources

- Wodehouse, P. G. (2000). Notes and Appendices by Richard Usborne, Revised and Updated by N.T.P. Murphy and Tony Ring. (ed.). Sunset at Blandings. Foreword by Douglas Adams. Penguin Books. ISBN 0-14-028465-6.
