= Michael Cobb (railway historian) =

Michael Cobb (10 September 1916 – 23 June 2010) was a British Army officer, cartographer, and railway historian who in 2003 published the monumental work The Railways of Great Britain: A Historical Atlas, which set out to map and record every railway station and line in existence in Britain between 1807 and 1994. In 2008, Cobb became the oldest person ever to be awarded a PhD from the University of Cambridge, for his atlas.

== Life ==
Cobb was born in 1916 at Harrow Weald and attended Harrow School and read Mechanical Sciences at Magdalene College, Cambridge. On taking his degree in 1938, Cobb joined the Royal Engineers and in 1940 participated in the Battle of France and the Dunkirk evacuation. For the rest of the war, Cobb served with an airborne commando force, but he was never deployed in combat, his troopship being sunk in the Mediterranean Sea en route to the Far East in 1944. After the war he served in Burma and Egypt before becoming superintendent of the Royal School of Military Survey. He retired in 1965 as a colonel and spent some years as a professional cartographer before becoming fully retired in 1971.

Cobb had been a lifelong railway enthusiast, he had contributed numerous train timing logs to various publications including the Railway Magazine. In 1978 he set about creating the most detailed study of the history and geography of British railways ever attempted. For 18 years he researched and wrote his atlas, completing it in 1996 and getting it published in 2003. The price of the initial print run of the atlas was subsidised to the tune of a quarter of a million pounds by Sir James Colyer-Ferguson, a fellow railway enthusiast. The book went through two editions, and with the support of Magdalene College, Cobb submitted his research for a PhD and was accepted, receiving his doctorate in 2008. A third edition was published in 2015.

The head of Cambridge's geography faculty described Cobb's work as "a remarkable piece of scholarship [...] It's not just of interest to the enthusiast, but a vital tool for anyone seriously interested in the economy, geography and history of Great Britain. There's nothing like it."

Cobb died on 23 June 2010 aged 93, survived by three sons.
