= Lord Emsworth =

Fictional character in P. G. Wodehouse stories

- Blandings Castle character
- First appearance: Something Fresh (1915)
- Last appearance: A Pelican at Blandings (1969; completed novel); Sunset at Blandings (unfinished novel)
- Created by: P. G. Wodehouse

In-universe information
- Full name: Clarence Threepwood
- Gender: Male
- Title: 9th Earl of Emsworth
- Family: Galahad Threepwood (brother); Lady Constance Keeble (sister); Lady Jane (sister); Georgiana, Lady Alcester (sister); Lady Julia Fish (sister); Lancelot Threepwood (brother); Lady Charlotte (sister); Lady Dora Garland (sister); Lady Hermione Wedge (sister); Lady Ann Warblington (sister); Lady Diana Phipps (sister)
- Spouse: Countess of Emsworth (deceased)
- Children: George Threepwood, Lord Bosham (son); Freddie Threepwood (son); Lady Mildred Mant (daughter)
- Relatives: James Threepwood (grandson); George Threepwood (grandson); Many others; see the list
- Nationality: British

Clarence Threepwood, 9th Earl of Emsworth, commonly known as Lord Emsworth, is a recurring fictional character in the Blandings Castle series of stories by British comic writer P. G. Wodehouse. He is the amiable, vague and often somewhat absent-minded head of the large Threepwood family. Longing for nothing more than to talk to his prize pig, Empress of Blandings, or potter peacefully in the idyllic gardens of Blandings Castle, he must frequently face the unpleasant reality of his domineering sisters and familial duties -- tasks for which the dreamy earl is comically ill-suited.

Lord Emsworth's first appearance is in the novel Something Fresh (1915). The last completed work by Wodehouse in which Emsworth appears is A Pelican at Blandings (1969). He is also in Wodehouse's unfinished novel Sunset at Blandings.

== Origins ==
Wodehouse frequently named his characters after places with which he was familiar, and Lord Emsworth takes his name from the Hampshire town of Emsworth, where Wodehouse spent some time in the 1900s; he first went there in 1903, at the invitation of his friend Herbert Westbrook, and later took a lease on a house there called "Threepwood Cottage", which name he used as Lord Emsworth's family name. Westbrook worked at a school in the town, and Wodehouse also mentions it in his 1909 novel Mike, as the place where Mike was at school prior to Wrykyn. Some of the many characters who are named after places in the vicinity of Emsworth include Lord Emsworth's heir, Viscount Bosham, Lady Anne Warblington, Lord Stockheath, the Duchess of Havant (in A Gentleman of Leisure), and Lord Arthur Hayling (in The Prince and Betty).

The name "Lord Emsworth" first appears in Wodehouse's works as a passing mention in a short called "The Matrimonial Sweepstakes", a version of "The Good Angel" printed in Cosmopolitan in the US in February 1910. "The Good Angel" as it appears in the 1914 collection The Man Upstairs contains no such mention, although there is a "Lord Stockleigh" involved.

== Life and character ==
Lord Emsworth is consistently presented just shy of sixty years old; since Wodehouse wrote about him for over half a century, in novels more or less set in the present, this means that his dates vary depending on what one is reading. As a child, he once took a dead pet rabbit to bed with him; at the age of fifteen, he smoked his first cigar, and he has rarely been called on to think quickly since hearing his father's footsteps approaching the stable-loft where he sat that day. Never the brightest of minds, at Eton College, they called him "Fathead"; and, by the time readers meet him, his slowness of thought has become a byword; he is prone to distraction and misunderstanding but is generally amiable. His simple outlook makes him an excellent sleeper; and, for twenty years, he has rarely got less than his eight hours, usually managing ten (he is particularly fond of sleeping at the start of train journeys). In Something Fresh, he keeps a revolver by his bed, with which to fire wildly at burglars or Rupert Baxter.

Lord Emsworth has ten sisters (one deceased), two brothers (one deceased), two sons, at least one daughter, and many in-laws. He is a widower; his wife died some years before he is introduced: "he was a man who since the death of his wife some twenty years ago had made something of a life's work of avoiding women." (Pigs Have Wings, 1952).

He is a long, thin, bald old man with a tendency towards scruffiness, generally found in a worn old tweed jacket and trousers that bag at the knees. He wears pince-nez on a string around his neck, which he nevertheless often loses. He resents being forced to dress up smartly, especially when he is also called on to address crowds and most of all loathes having to visit London when the sun is shining. In "Lord Emsworth Acts for the Best", he grows a rather ragged beard, little realising the peril this puts his castle in, and he soon realises it is better to remove it.

In his later years, the main troubles of his life stem from his many sisters, particularly the formidable Connie, who despair at his eccentric appearance and distracted ways, and his younger son Freddie, whom he longs to see safely married off and out of trouble; his joy at seeing him finally paired off with Aggie Donaldson knows no bounds. The frequent visits (in later works) of his disreputable brother Gally add further to life's complications and his sister Connie's frustrations.

In "Jeeves Takes Charge", a short story in Wodehouse's Jeeves series, it's revealed that Lord Emsworth in his youth went about with young men who behaved "in a manner that would not have been tolerated in the fo'castle of a whaler" according to Lady Florence Craye.

=== List of relatives ===
Clarence Threepwood, Lord Emsworth, has a large family. One possible sister, Lady Florence Moresby, appears only in the unfinished novel Sunset at Blandings. According to the book Wodehouse at Blandings Castle by Tony Ring and Geoffrey Jaggard, Lord Emsworth has a daughter named Lady Lilian Baldicott in The Cabaret Girl, though no such character is mentioned in the Blandings stories. Since these two characters are not confirmed to exist in completed Blandings stories, they are listed with asterisks below. Additionally, Lord Bosham (pronounced "Bozzam") is variously described as having two sons or three sons.

Note that some marriages occur during the Blandings series of stories, and the spouses of Lord Emsworth's nieces and nephews are not included in this list. Also note that Lord Emsworth and his siblings are children of the previous Earl of Emsworth and thus have titles in accordance with forms of address for earls and their children in the UK. Some characters, such as Lady Alcester, acquired a title through marriage.

The family and relatives of Lord Emsworth (described by their connection to Lord Emsworth) include:

- Lady Emsworth (spouse; deceased)
- George Threepwood, Lord Bosham (son)
  - Cecily Threepwood, Lady Bosham (daughter-in-law)
  - James Threepwood (grandson)
  - George Threepwood (grandson)
- The Hon. Freddie Threepwood (son)
  - Aggie Threepwoood (daughter-in-law)
- Lady Mildred Mant (daughter)
  - Colonel Horace Mant (son-in-law)
- Lady Lilian Baldicott (daughter)*
- The Hon. Galahad Threepwood (brother)
- Lady Constance Keeble (sister)
  - Joseph Keeble (brother-in-law; dies sometime before Service With a Smile)
  - Phyllis Jackson (step-niece)
  - James Schoonmaker (brother-in-law)
  - Myra Schoonmaker (step-niece)
- Lady Jane (sister; deceased)
  - Angela (niece)
- Georgiana, Lady Alcester
  - Gertrude (niece)
- Lady Julia Fish (sister)
  - Sir Miles Fish (brother-in-law; deceased)
  - Ronnie Fish (nephew)
- The Hon. Lancelot Threepwood (brother; deceased)
  - Millicent Threepwood (niece)
- Lady Charlotte (sister)
  - Jane (niece)
- Lady Dora Garland (sister)
  - Sir Everard Garland (brother-in-law; deceased)
  - Prudence Garland (niece)
- Lady Hermione Wedge (sister)
  - Colonel Egbert Wedge (brother-in-law)
  - Veronica Wedge (niece)
- Lady Ann Warblington (sister)
- Lady Diana Phipps (sister)
- Lady Florence Moresby (sister)*
- Percy, Lord Stockheath (nephew; unspecified parentage)
- Wilfred Allsop (nephew; unspecified parentage)

== Activities ==
He shuns his administrative duties and generally has a secretary to handle such things; amongst the occupants of this post have been the likes of Hugo Carmody, Monty Bodkin and Psmith, although by far the best known, and least appreciated by his Lordship, is Rupert Baxter, the bespectacled efficiency expert, who made Emsworth's life a misery with his ruthless organisation of his master's precious time.

Emsworth's favourite pastimes are his pig and his garden, and he spends many a happy hour pottering about it, arguing with his gardeners, especially Angus McAllister, whose desire to gravel the famous Yew Alley is particularly upsetting to his Lordship, and with his pig-keepers, who include Wellbeloved, Pirbright, and the Amazonian Monica Simmons.

He won first prize for roses at the Shrewsbury Flower Show in the same year Psmith's father won the tulip prize, and he is invariably amongst the competitors in Shropshire's Agriculture Show. He has some success in the field of large pumpkins, taking first prize in the competition with his "Blandings Hope" (cruelly nicknamed "Percy" by his son Freddie). He later enters his prize sow, the Empress of Blandings, who wins the coveted Fat Pigs contest several years in a row. The Empress's primary competitor is the Pride of Matchingham, who belongs to Sir Gregory Parsloe-Parsloe, Emsworth's neighbour and rival. Once the pig fever has taken him, he is mostly to be found draped bonelessly over the pig pen, looking like an old sock.

In less salubrious weather, he likes to mess around in his museum or sit comfortably in the library, reading some informative tome of agricultural lore; his favourite being Whiffle on The Care of the Pig. A well-preserved fellow, he has a swim in the lake every morning he can and has a fondness for amateur medicine, never happier than when trying out some new unction.

== Stories ==
Lord Emsworth plays some part in all the novels and short stories in the Blandings canon. The short stories often feature Emsworth as the central character.

== Adaptations ==
Television

- John Miller portrayed Lord Emsworth in televised plays based on the short stories "Pig-hoo-o-o-o-ey" and "Lord Emsworth and the Girl Friend" that aired on BBC Television in 1954 and 1956.
- Ralph Richardson played him in six episodes of The World of Wodehouse, made by the BBC and broadcast in 1967.
- He was portrayed by Cyril Luckham in the 1981 BBC television film Thank You, P. G. Wodehouse.
- Peter O'Toole portrayed him in the 1995 BBC television film Heavy Weather, broadcast in the United States by PBS.
- Timothy Spall played him in the BBC series Blandings (2013–2014).

Film

- Clive Currie portrayed Lord Emsworth in the film Leave It to Me (1933).
- Horace Hodges played Lord Emsworth in the 1933 silent film Summer Lightning.

Radio

- In 1939, C. V. France portrayed Lord Emsworth in a radio dramatisation of "The Crime Wave at Blandings".
- Frederick Lloyd portrayed Lord Emsworth in the 1940 BBC Home Service radio dramatisations of "Lord Emsworth Acts for the Best" and "Pig-hoo-o-o-o-ey".
- Michael Hordern voiced Lord Emsworth in the 1981 radio adaptation of Leave It to Psmith.
- Lord Emsworth was voiced by Giles Havergal in the 1999 radio adaptation of Full Moon.
- Richard Vernon portrayed Lord Emsworth in the 1985–1992 Blandings radio series.
- Martin Jarvis portrayed Emsworth for BBC Radio 4 in adaptations of Something Fresh (2009), Summer Lightning (2010), Uncle Fred in the Springtime (2012), and Leave it to Psmith (2020).

Stage

- In the 1930 premiere of the play adaptation of Leave It to Psmith by Wodehouse and Ian Hay, Clive Currie appeared as the Earl of Middlewick, the play's version of Lord Emsworth.
- Emsworth has been portrayed by various actors in productions of Giles Havergal's 1992 stage adaptation of Summer Lightning.
