= List of Mexican voice actors =

This is a list of famous and notable Mexican dubbing voice actors in alphabetical order by last names, where applicable. This would include persons who are known to a large number of people and is not based on the extent of their popularity or the list viewed from the context of the present. Their fame could be brief; what matters is that they were well known during the peak of their popularity.

In the Hispanic community, the dubbed voices of famous film actors are remembered better and became widely recognizable. For example, the Spanish voice of Homer Simpson from The Simpsons, translated as "Homero", performed by Humberto Vélez, is one of the most famous in Latin America.

These actors often become stars in the science fiction or subgenre fandoms, such as anime fandom, and become guests in fan conventions.

== Famous voice actors ==
=== Pre-1970s generation ===
- Jorge Arvizu: Voice of Bugs Bunny, Fred Flintstone ("Pedro Picapiedra"), and Ringo Starr and George Harrison in The Beatles animated series. (1932–2014)
- Jesús Barrero: Voice of Rick Hunter (first voice) in Robotech, Luke Skywalker in Star Wars (fourth voice), Pegasus Seiya in Saint Seiya, Rex in the Toy Story films, Flik in A Bug's Life, Banzai in The Lion King, and Kuzco in The Emperor's New Groove and The Emperor's New School (1951–2016)
- Narciso Busquets: Regarded by his actor peers as one of the greatest voice actors and directors, he directed and acted in countless films, TV shows, anime, etc. Known for his mastery of the dubbing technique, and his disciplined, energetic, strict attitude on voice directing, he served as a mentor on voice acting for countless actors from later generations. He's known as one of the first actors in Mexico who did dubbing of himself on movies he appeared in as early as 1937. Voice of George C. Scott in Patton, first voice of Slimer in The Real Ghostbusters, voice of Professor Ratigan in The Great Mouse Detective (1931–1989)
- Irma Carmona: Voice of Brother Bear in The Berenstain Bears, Ranma Saotome (female) in Ranma ½, and Sailor Neptune in Sailor Moon (born 1960)
- Francisco Colmenero: voice of Pumbaa in The Lion King, Goofy in productions until the mid-1990s, Pete in many Disney Productions, Templeton the rat in Charlotte's Web, Grumpy in Snow White and The Seven Dwarfs (second voice), Earl in Dinosaurs, and the narrator in Beauty and the Beast) (still active) (born 1932)
- José Lavat: Voice of Superman, Indiana Jones, John Kramer/Jigsaw in Saw, HAL 9000 in 2001: A Space Odyssey, Count Dooku in the Star Wars franchise, Aslan in The Chronicles of Narnia franchise, Ian McKellen, and Robert De Niro (1948–2018)
- Jorge Lavat
- Arturo Mercado (voice of Beast in Beauty and the Beast, Shaggy Rogers (first voice), adult Simba, George Clooney, Kevin Flynn/Clu in Tron and Tron Legacy, Wooldoor Sockbat in Drawn Together, Scrooge McDuck, Darkwing Duck, Ludwig Von Drake, and Mortimer Mouse from Disney (still active) (Born 1940)
- Fanny Schiller: Voice of the Fairy Godmother in Cinderella, Snapdragon (purple flower) in Alice in Wonderland, Aunt Sara in Lady and the Tramp, Flora in Sleeping Beauty, and Pearl Slaghoople in The Flintstones (1901–1971)
- Esteban Siller: Voice of Gargamel, Yosemite Sam (third voice), Rabbit (second voice) in Winnie the Pooh (1931–2013), and Chucky/Charles Lee Ray (original voice) in Child's Play (1988 film)
- Diana Santos: voice of Minnie Mouse, Belle in Beauty and the Beast, Mowgli in The Jungle Book and Jungle Cubs, Sunni Gummi and Princess Calla in Gummy Bears (born 1950) She debuted in dubbing in 1956. (still active)

=== 1970s generation ===
- Patricia Acevedo: Voice of Lisa Simpson (first voice and current voice) in The Simpsons, Sailor Moon, Rachel Green in Friends, Angelica Pickles in Rugrats, and Chi-Chi (Milk) in Dragon Ball (still active) (born 1955)
- Germán Robles: Voice of KITT in Knight Rider (1929–2015)

=== 1980s generation ===
- Rossy Aguirre: Voice of Akane Tendo in Ranma ½ (first voice), Sailor Mercury in Sailor Moon, Buttercup in The Powerpuff Girls, D.W. Read in Arthur, Phoebe Heyerdahl in Hey Arnold!, Krillin in Dragon Ball, and Andy Barclay (original voice) in Child's Play (1988 film) (still active)
- Mario Castañeda: Voice of Goku in Dragon Ball, Jim Carrey, Cosmo Kramer in Seinfeld, James the Red Engine, Zapp Brannigan in Futurama, Nephrite in Sailor Moon, Bruce Willis, Johnny Cage in Mortal Kombat X.
- Arturo Mercado Jr: Voice of Mickey Mouse from Disney, the second voice of Woody in Toy Story 3 and Toy Story 4, Harry Osborn in Spider-Man (2002 film series)
- Luis Alfonso Mendoza: Voice of teenage and adult Gohan in Dragon Ball, Bugs Bunny in Looney Tunes, and Sheldon Cooper in The Big Bang Theory.
- Gabriel Chávez: Voice of Mr. Burns (first voice) in The Simpsons, Ed Bighead in Rocko's Modern Life, Grandpa Phil in Hey Arnold!, and Buzz Buzzard in The New Woody Woodpecker Show (still active)
- Marina Huerta: Voice of Bart Simpson (first and third voice) and Marge Simpson (second voice) in The Simpsons and Chuckie Finster (first voice) in Rugrats (still active)
- Belinda Martinez: Voice of Sailor Uranus in Sailor Moon Sailor Stars and Truffles in Chowder (still active)
- María Fernanda Morales: Voice of Elaine in Seinfeld, Sailor Venus in Sailor Moon, Kimi Finster in Rugrats and All Grown Up!, Nala in The Lion King, Princess Peach, Tak in Invader Zim, Muffy Crosswire in Arthur, Spencer Hastings in Pretty Little Liars, and Lola Bunny (first voice) in Space Jam and Space Jam: A New Legacy (still active) (Born 1970)
- Gerardo Reyero: Voice of Han Solo (fourth voice), Jim Carrey, Freeza in Dragon Ball Z, V in V for Vendetta, Raiden in Mortal Kombat X and Mortal Kombat 11, Captain Hero in Drawn Together, and Captain Gantu in Lilo & Stitch (still active)
- Benjamín Rivera: Voice of Philip J. Fry in Futurama (first voice), Nelson Muntz (first voice), John Connor (first voice), Ryoga Hibiki (second voice) in Ranma ½, Richard Watterson in The Amazing World of Gumball, and Leonardo in Teenage Mutant Ninja Turtles (third voice) (still active)
- Víctor Trujillo: Voice of Lion-O in Thundercats, James P. Sullivan (a.k.a. "Sulley") in Monsters, Inc. and Monsters University, and Mr. Incredible in The Incredibles (franchise) (born 1961) (still active)
- Humberto Vélez: Voice of Homer Simpson (translated as "Homero") (first voice) in The Simpsons, Winnie the Pooh, The Penguin in Batman Arkham Origins and Batman Arkham Knight, and Cyberdyne Systems Model 101 In Terminator (second voice) (born 1955) (still active)

=== 1990s generation ===
- Liliana Barba: Voice of Daisy Duck (current voice) from Disney, May (second voice) in Pokémon, Sango in InuYasha, Kyle Broflovski (first voice) in South Park, Chuckie Finster (second voice) in Rugrats, Lizzie McGuire, Vanellope in Ralph Breaks the Internet (second voice) and Mary Jane Watson in Spider-Man 3 and The Spectacular Spider-Man (still active)
- Irwin Daayán: Voice of Dende in Dragon Ball Z, Joe Shimamura in Cyborg 009, GIR in Invader Zim, Sheen in Jimmy Neutron, Kimimaro in Naruto, the Winter Soldier in Marvel Cinematic Universe (first voice), Anakin Skywalker, and Daffy Duck in Looney Tunes (born 1978)
- Laura Torres: Voice of child Goku, Gohan, and Goten in Dragon Ball, Tommy Pickles in Rugrats (franchise), Nobita Nobi in Doraemon
- Eduardo Garza: Voice of Elmo (first voice), Big Bird (second voice), Xandir in Drawn Together, Gaara in Naruto, Josh Nichols in Drake & Josh, Pinocchio in the Shrek movies (excluding the first), Ichigo Kurosaki in Bleach, Nightwing in Batman Arkham Knight, Kung Lao, Rain, and Reptile in Mortal Kombat X, Krillin in Dragon Ball Z (second voice), and Francis in Malcolm In The Middle (first voice) (still active) (born 1976)
- Rafael Pacheco: Voice of Kevin Levin in Ben 10: Alien Force, Ace in The Powerpuff Girls (second voice), Lenny in Camp Lazlo, and Principal Nigel Brown in The Amazing World of Gumball (still active)
- Alejandro Mayén: Voice of Hal Wilkerson in Malcolm in the Middle and Peter Griffin in Family Guy; was accused of being a harasser by fellow dubbing artists such as Cony Madera.
- Héctor Indriago: Mexican-Venezuelan and voice of Batman in the Spanish dub of DC productions. He is best known for being the recurring voice of Batman in Warner Bros. Animation's DC Comics productions since 2004, Gustavo Rocque in Big Time Rush, Helio in the Winx Club franchise, Jerry Smith in Rick and Morty, Trent in the Total Drama franchise, Ban Mido in GetBackers, Ira in Fullmetal Alchemist, Van Hohenheim in Fullmetal Alchemist: Brotherhood, among others. He began dubbing in late 1999 and early 2000.
- Claudia Motta: Voice of Bart Simpson (second voice) in The Simpsons, Applejack in My Little Pony: Friendship Is Magic, Mary Jane Watson in Spider-Man and Spider-Man 2 (first voice), Lila Sawyer in Hey Arnold! (still active).
- Xóchitl Ugarte: Voice of Misty in Pokémon, Sabrina, the Teenage Witch (second voice), Sami Brady in Days of Our Lives, Sam in Totally Spies!, Silver Sable in Marvel's Spider-Man, and Brandy Harrington in Brandy & Mr. Whiskers (still active) (born 1979)
- Andonni Sánchez: Voice of Chowder in Chowder, Tod in The Fox and the Hound 2, Rito in Winnie the Pooh: Springtime with Roo, and Bruce in Hotel for Dogs.
- Monserrat Mendoza: Voice of Panini in Chowder, Margo in the Despicable Me franchise, Runo Misaki in Bakugan Battle Brawlers, and Lynn Loud Jr in The Loud House (franchise).
- Carla Castañeda: Voice of Twilight Sparkle in My Little Pony: Friendship Is Magic, Lola Bunny (current and second voice) in The Looney Tunes Show and Looney Tunes: Rabbits Run, Babsy Bunny (second voice) in Tiny Toons Looniversity, and Clawdeen Wolf in Monster High (TV series).

=== 2000s generation ===
- Claudio Velázquez: Voice of Mac in Foster's Home for Imaginary Friends, Astro Boy, Baby Sylvester in Baby Looney Tunes (first voice), Jeremie Belpois in Code Lyoko (first voice), Max in Dragon Tales (second voice) (still active)

== See also ==
- List of Mexicans
