= Mexican animation =

Part of Mexico's film industry

The Mexican animation industry is a part of Mexico's domestic film industry. It utilizes primarily the flash, CG, and traditional animation formats, typically produced on a small budget. These studios included Ánima Estudios, Animex Producciones, Huevocartoon, among others. It began in 1915 with the first animated film of the country, Mi Sueño, and continues decades later.

== History ==
=== Early years ===
The first documented Mexican animation is Mi Sueño. The film was made in 1915 and the author remains unknown. First known Mexican animator is Miguel Angel Acosta, who made more than two-hundred animated films of about thirty seconds each. Other early pioneer of Mexican animation was the painter Juan Arthenack. Salvador Pruneda, Bismarck Mier, and Salvador Patiño, founded an animation studio in Mexico City after taking inspiration from Fleischers and Disney during the 1920s. Pruneda adapted the comic strip Don Catarino y su apreciable familia, which was screened in 1934 despite remaining unfinished. Pruneda tried to make an animated sequence for the film Revista Musical, but the project failed due to financial problems.

In 1934, the otolaryngologist Alfonso Vergara Andrade founded AVA Studios in Mexico City with Antonio Chavira and Francisco Gómez. After three years, the studio produced eight shorts. The first short was Paco Perico en première (Paco Perico’s Premiere, 1935), a gag film according to the American model. In 1936, Los cinco cabritos (The Five Little Goats, 1936), directed by Bismarck Mier, was released. This film was a Mexican version of Disney’s Three Little Pigs (1933), and was the first Mexican color animated film, using a bichromic Cinecolor or bicolor. The next film was Una Noche de Posada (One Night At A Posada, 1937). In 1939, AVA went out of business.

In 1942 and 1943, Walt Disney and his wife visited Mexico. The Mexican Ernesto ´Ernie´ Terrazas and Edmundo Santos crossed the border with him. After the visit, Disney produced The Three Caballeros, which world premiere was screened at Cine Alameda in Mexico City in 1944. However for unexplained reasons, the Mexican animators didn't receive screen credit. The main Mexican character Pancho Pistolas was invented by Terrazas.

The Mexican advertising agent Santiago Reachi Fayad (aka Santiago Reachi) hired four Californian animators and founded Caricolor studio, a project that was interrupted by the Second World War. The studio only completed the short-film Me Voy de Cacería (I Go Hunting), an homage to Tequila. In 1947, Caricaturas Animadas de México was founded, a study that most prominent work was an animated fly in the first Mexican film that combined live-action and animation, El diablo no es tan diablo (The Devil Is Not So Devil, 1949).

=== 1950s - 1980s ===
In the late 1950s and early 1960s, animation in Mexico was restricted to short formats. Dibujos Animados S.A., also ran by Terrazas, created Cold War UPA-inspired anti-communist propaganda cartoons for the USIA with the intention of showing these films in Latin America (despite being unaware of the intent to do so) featuring "good guys" Manolin the rooster and Burrito the donkey and "bad guys" Armando Lios the raven and Chente the wolf, bringing together the best Mexican animators at the time alongside American animation directors (including Emery Hawkins who directed one of the shorts). Also around this time, the country was responsible for the Animation services provided in Rocky & Bullwinkle set up by the sponsor to produce the series on a low budget. In 1972, La familia Telemiau ("The Telemiau Family") was the first animated television series to be created in Mexico. It received poor ratings due to competition with more popular American animated shows, such as those of Hanna-Barbera. The country's first feature film, Los tres Reyes Magos ("The Three Wise Men"), was released in 1974, directed by Fernando Ruiz. It was a Mexican adaptation of the Biblical Magi story.

In 1984, the country released its first successful animated film, Katy La Oruga ("Katy the Caterpillar"). It was followed by a made-for-television sequel, Katy, Kiki y Koko. In 1987, Mexico released Las Aventuras de Oliver Twist ("The adventures of Oliver Twist"), a Mexican film adaptation of Charles Dickens Oliver Twist book. It was the second animated film directed by Fernando Ruiz.

=== 2000s - 2010s ===
After 1987, the creation of animation significantly slowed down, as not much was done in the 1990s, with the exception of advertising. It did not fully restart until 2003, when Mexico City-based animation studio, Ánima Estudios, released Magos y Gigantes (Wizards and Giants). The company later released Imaginum, in 2005. Since then, Ánima Estudios has produced more films and animated content for television.

In 2006, Huevocartoon, a popular multimedia brand focused on eggs, released its first feature film, Una pelicula de huevos. It proved to be a box-office success, grossing $142.3 million pesos. It held the record as the highest-grossing Mexican animated film of all time for nine years. It was followed by two sequels. Founded in 2001, Huevocartoon has produced a lot of animated internet content, funded by its advertising campaign.

In the same year, El Chavo Animado (an animated version of the popular comedy El Chavo del Ocho series), premiered in Televisa networks with high ratings. It ran until 2014.

In 2007, Animex Producciones released La leyenda de la Nahuala, directed by Ricardo Arnaiz. It grossed $42.2 million pesos and was one of Mexico's highest-grossing animated films at the time. It was followed by even more successful sequels and a television series.

In 2011, Don gato y su pandilla, an animated film based on Hanna-Barbera's Top Cat series was released successfully, earning $112.25 million pesos in its theatrical run. It was followed by a computer-animated prequel. Both films were produced by Ánima Estudios.

Un gallo con muchos huevos ("A rooster with many eggs"), a computer-animated film, was released in 2015. It grossed $167.8 million pesos, breaking box-office records in Mexico, overtaking the original Huevos film as Mexico's highest-grossing animated film.

In 2012, Villainous, a comedy web series created by Alan Ituriel, premiered on internet platforms. The series gained unexpected popularity and was picked up for television by the Latin American branch of Cartoon Network. It was shown on the network's Anything application on digital devices in 2016.

In 2017, Ánima Estudios, Latin America's largest animation studio, was recognized by Forbes Mexico. as the region's most important and successful animation studio.

=== 2020s - present ===
In 2020, Ánima Estudios has released the superhero film, La liga de los 5, which is a first for the Mexican cinema industry. Marvick Núñez, first time director and experienced animator since 1996, explained the entire process of the country's animation industry which he calls it "very small". "Let's say I had to see the birth of modern industry, the way we perceive animation now[.] [Y]ou didn't even think about dreams that a studio would make an animated movie in Mexico," said Núñez. He also stated that despite the frequent successes of the films, the industry has not gained global attention, adding that it "is emerging and is gradually gaining ground." He later added that a reasoning for the industry's lack of sufficient quality is due to a limited amount of universities in the country dedicated to animation and gaming, as well as the singular focus on an animation element over multiples. "Here in Mexico it seems to me that there are hardly two or three universities focused entirely on it," he said. “More people need to know how to make animation with all the departments they need: character design, art design, backgrounds… not only to animate the character, that's just one of the departments."

Guillermo del Toro's 2022 stop-motion adaptation of Pinocchio, made by Taller del Chucho as a co-production with American studios Netflix Animation and The Jim Henson Company, won the Academy Award for Best Animated Feature.

== See also ==
- Ánima Estudios
- List of Mexican animated films
- Cinema of Mexico
- Huevocartoon
- Animex Producciones
