= List of M*A*S*H cast members =

Cast members of the TV adaptation of M*A*S*H

The following is a list of cast members from the television series adaptation of M*A*S*H. The term cast members includes one-episode guest appearances. The popularity of M*A*S*H is reflected in the fact that "Goodbye, Farewell and Amen", the show's series finale, was the most watched TV series finale ever when it first aired in 1983, and it remains in that position four decades later.

== A ==
- Patricia Acevedo
- Patrick Adiarte
- Alan Alda
- Anthony Alda
- Robert Alda
- John Anderson
- Allan Arbus
- John Ashton
- Tom Atkins
- René Auberjonois

== B ==
- G. W. Bailey
- Jack Baker
- Katherine Baumann
- Ned Beatty
- Ed Begley, Jr.
- Michael Bell
- Xander Berkeley
- Jason Bernard
- Leslie Bevis
- Sorrell Booke
- Roger Bowen
- Gail Bowman
- Guy Boyd
- Bart Braverman
- Timothy Brown
- Joshua Bryant
- Gary Burghoff
- Billy Green Bush

== C ==
- Hamilton Camp
- Beeson Carroll
- Mary Jo Catlett
- Rosalind Chao
- Sylvia Chang
- Stuart Charno
- William Christopher
- Blake Clark
- Jordan Clarke
- Andrew Dice Clay
- Odessa Cleveland
- Barry Corbin
- Bud Cort
- James Cromwell
- Brett Cullen
- Michael Currie

== D ==
- Blythe Danner
- Brian Dennehy
- Ann Doran
- Dennis Dugan
- Andrew Duggan
- Robert Duvall

== E ==
- Jeff East
- Gail Edwards
- Michael Ensign
- Richard Ely
- Art Evans
- Gene Evans

== F ==
- Jamie Farr
- Gwen Farrell
- Judy Farrell
- Mike Farrell
- Martin Ferrero
- Frances Fong
- Dennis Fimple
- Laurence Fishburne
- Ed Flanders
- Bernard Fox
- Charles Frank
- Alan Fudge

== G ==
- Teri Garr
- Marcia Gelman
- Danny Goldman
- Roy Goldman
- Arlene Golonka
- Robert Gooden
- David Graf
- Ronny Graham
- James Gregory
- Maru Guerrero
- Anthony Gange

== H ==
- Kevin Hagen
- Albert Hall
- Philip Baker Hall
- Charles Hallahan
- Gregory Harrison
- Mariette Hartley
- Johnny Haymer
- Sandy Helberg
- Mike Henry
- Alex Henteloff
- Richard Herd
- Mark Herrier
- Edward Herrmann
- Hilly Hicks
- Pat Hingle
- Robert J. Hogan
- Tad Horino
- Michael Horton
- Shizuko Hoshi
- Jerry Houser
- Ron Howard

== I ==
- Alejandro Illescas
- Robert Ito

== J ==
- Mickey Jones

== K ==
- Alex Karras
- Linda Kelsey
- Enid Kent
- Kieu Chinh
- Bruce Kirby
- Bruno Kirby
- Clyde Kusatsu

== L ==
- John Lavachielli
- Art LaFleur
- Perry Lang
- Sheila Lauritsen
- Britt Leach
- Michael Lerner
- George Lindsey
- Richard Lineback
- Paul Linke
- Larry Linville
- Carol Locatell
- Shelley Long

== M ==
- Patch Mackenzie
- Mako
- Richard Masur
- John Matuszak
- Jeff Maxwell
- Amanda McBloom
- Enrique Mederos
- Linda Meiklejohn
- Lynette Mettey
- Denny Miller
- Alan Miró
- Harry Morgan
- Pat Morita
- Joe Morton
- Melinda Mullins
- Christopher Murney
- Michael Murphy

== N ==
- Kellye Nakahara
- Lori Noel

== O ==
- Soon-Tek Oh
- Michael O'Keefe
- John Orchard
- Cyril O'Reilly

== P ==
- Joe Pantoliano
- David Packer
- Jo Ann Pflug
- Robert Phalen
- Karen Philipp
- Mary Kay Place
- Nicholas Pryor

== Q ==
- Eldon Quick

== R ==
- Logan Ramsey
- John Randolph
- Stafford Repp
- Gerardo Reyero
- Gene Reynolds
- Peter Riegert
- Jack Riley
- John Ritter
- Benjamín Rivera
- Clete Roberts
- Wayne Rogers
- Andy Romano

== S ==
- Susan Saint James
- Eileen Saki
- John Schuck
- James Sikking
- Tom Skerritt
- Jack Soo
- Timothy Stack
- Warren Stevens
- McLean Stevenson
- Lynne Marie Stewart
- David Ogden Stiers
- Leonard Stone
- Marcia Strassman
- Gail Strickland
- Tom Sullivan
- Hope Summers
- Todd Susman
- Michael Swan
- Patrick Swayze
- Loretta Swit

== T ==
- Jeffrey Tambor
- Vic Tayback
- Mark L. Taylor
- Meshach Taylor
- Dennis Troy

== V ==
- Joan Van Ark
- Sal Viscuso
- Herb Voland

== W ==
- Loudon Wainwright III
- Jessica Walter
- Kelly Ward
- Craig Wasson
- George Wendt
- Mary Wickes
- Larry Wilcox
- Fred Williamson
- Rita Wilson
- Edward Winter
- G. Wood
- George Wyner

== Y ==
- Burt Young

== Z ==
- Jerry Zaks
- Susanne Zenor

=== M*A*S*H cast members who have died ===
From the TV series

- Gwen Farrell (November 29, 1932 – April 30, 2026; 93)
- Loretta Swit (November 4, 1937 – May 30, 2025; 87)
- Kellye Nakahara (January 16, 1948 – February 16, 2020; 72)
- David Ogden Stiers (October 31, 1942 – March 3, 2018; 75)
- William Christopher (October 20, 1932 – December 31, 2016; 84)
- Wayne Rogers (April 7, 1933 – December 31, 2015; 82)
- Harry Morgan (April 10, 1915 – December 7, 2011; 96)
- Larry Linville (September 29, 1939 – April 10, 2000; 60)
- McLean Stevenson (November 27, 1927 – February 15, 1996; 68)

Notable guest actors

- Teri Garr (December 11, 1944 - October 29, 2024; 79)
- Eileen Saki (November 18, 1943 – May 1, 2023; 79)
- Judy Farrell (May 11, 1938 – April 2, 2023; 84)
- Timothy Brown (actor) (May 24, 1937 – April 4, 2020; 82)
- Soon-Tek Oh (June 29, 1932 – April 4, 2018; 85)
- Edward Herrmann (July 21, 1943 – December 31, 2014; 71)
- Marcia Strassman (April 28, 1948 – October 24, 2014; 66)
- Allan Arbus (February 15, 1918 – April 19, 2013; 95)
- Alex Karras (July 15, 1935 – October 12, 2012; 77)
- Leslie Nielsen (February 11, 1926 – November 28, 2010; 84)
- Pat Stevens (September 16, 1945 – May 26, 2010; 64)
- Patrick Swayze (August 18, 1952 – September 14, 2009; 57)
- Antony Alda (December 9, 1956 – July 3, 2009; 52)
- Pat Hingle (July 19, 1924 – January 3, 2009; 84)
- Robert Symonds (December 1, 1926 – August 23, 2007; 80)
- Bruno Kirby (April 28, 1949 – August 14, 2006; 57)
- Mako Iwamatsu (December 10, 1933 – July 21, 2006; 72)
- Pat Morita (June 28, 1932 – November 24, 2005; 73)
- John Ritter (September 17, 1948 – September 11, 2003; 54)
- Dennis Fimple (November 11, 1940 – August 23, 2002; 61)
- David Graf (April 16, 1950 – April 7, 2001; 50)
- Richard Ely (May 4, 1945 – December 9, 2019; 74)
- Edward Winter (June 3, 1937 – March 8, 2001; 63)
- G. Wood (George) (December 31, 1919 – July 24, 2000; 80)
- Sorrell Booke (January 4, 1930 – February 11, 1994; 64)
- Johnny Haymer (January 19, 1920 – November 18, 1989; 69)
- Robert Alda (February 26, 1914 – May 3, 1986; 72)
- Herb Voland (October 2, 1918 – April 26, 1981; 62)
- Jack Soo (October 28, 1917 – January 11, 1979; 61)

From the 1970 film

- Bud Cort (March 29, 1948 – February 11, 2026; 77)
- Donald Sutherland (July 17, 1935 – June 20, 2024; 88)
- Sally Kellerman (June 2, 1937 – February 24, 2022; 84)
- René Auberjonois (June 1, 1940 – December 8, 2019; 79)
- Dale Ishimoto (April 3, 1923 – March 4, 2004; 80)
- G. Wood (George) (December 31, 1919 – July 24, 2000; 80)
- Bobby Troup (October 18, 1918 – February 7, 1999; 80)
- Dick O'Neill (August 29, 1928 – November 17, 1998; 70)
- Tamara Wilcox (March 4, 1940 – January 30, 1998; 57)
- Roger Bowen (May 25, 1932 – February 16, 1996; 63)
- David Arkin (December 24, 1941 – January 14, 1991; 49)
- Marvin Miller (July 18, 1913 – February 8, 1985; 71)
- Indus Arthur (April 28, 1941 – December 29, 1984; 43)

== See also ==
- List of M*A*S*H characters
- List of M*A*S*H episodes
