= Magos y gigantes =

2003 Mexican animated film

Magos y Gigantes
- Theatrical release poster
- Directed by: Andrés Couturier; Eduardo Sprowls C.
- Written by: Francisco Hirata
- Story by: Adolfo Martínez Vara; José C. García de Letona; Francisco Hirata
- Produced by: Fernando de Fuentes S. Guillermo Cañedo W. Juan Fernando Pérez Gavilán M.
- Starring: Xóchitl Ugarte; Rossy Aguirre; Rubén Trujillo; Gaby Ugarte; Francisco Colmenero; Miguel Couturier; Eduardo Garza; Juan Ramón Huerta; Arath de la Torre; Moisés Iván Mora
- Edited by: Jorge Hernández S.
- Music by: Xavier Asali
- Production company: Ánima Estudios
- Distributed by: 20th Century Fox International
- Release date: November 19, 2003
- Running time: 84 minutes
- Country: Mexico
- Language: Spanish
- Box office: MX$8.3 million (US$731,662)

Magos y Gigantes (known as Wizards and Giants in English) is a 2003 Mexican animated fantasy comedy film produced by Ánima Estudios and 20th Century Fox, and released on November 19, 2003. Directed by Andrés Couturier and Eduardo Sprowls C., it was the first theatrically released animated film created with Adobe Flash. It was also the first Mexican animated feature in 30 years.

It stars Xóchitl Ugarte, Rossy Aguirre and Trujo as the voices of Gigante, Ada and Trafalgar, respectively. The main antagonist, Titán Caradura, is played by actor and comedian Arath de la Torre. Also featured are actors Gaby Ugarte, Francisco Colmenero, Moisés Iván Mora and Miguel Couturier.

The film, set in a magical village inhabited by colorful beings and creatures that are part of a medieval kingdom, follows the story of Gigante (Xóchitl Ugarte), Ada (Aguirre) and Trafalgar (Trujo), three misfit children who join forces to rescue Princess Luna (Gaby Ugarte), daughter of the kingdom's rulers. At the same time, they must recover a powerful magic scroll and defeat Titán Caradura (De la Torre), a young sorcerer who wants to steal the magic of the villagers to become powerful and take over the kingdom.

An animated series loosely based on the film, Awesome Magical Tales, premiered in 2012.

== Plot summary ==
Magos y Gigantes tells the story of Gigante, a vertically challenged giant, Ada, a fairy whose wings have yet to blossom, and Trafalgar, a curious-looking little wizard, and their adventures while attending the biggest magic tournament in the land of Reino Magico. Mayhem ensues when Titan Caradura, an evil wizard, is disqualified from the tournament and seeks revenge by hatching up an elaborate plan to steal the magic powers from all the inhabitants of Reino Magico.

== Cast ==
- Xóchitl Ugarte as Gigante, a young giant who didn't grow up to be one.
- Rossy Aguirre as Ada, a fairy who can't fly.
- Rubén Trujillo as Trafalgar, a clumsy magician who cast spells incorrectly.
- Arath de la Torre as Titán Caradura
- Francisco Colmenero as Mago Enigma
- Miguel Couturier as Omega / Guardaespaldas 1
- Eduardo Garza as Jack in the Box
- Juan Ramón Huerta as Alfa / Guardaespaldas 2
- Moisés Iván Mora as Cochinito
- Gaby Ugarte as Princesa Luna

== Release ==
The film was released in theaters on November 19, 2003, in Mexico, produced by Ánima Estudios and distributed by 20th Century Fox Mexico. The film was produced in flash animation, which is the first animated film to be released theatrically, using that animation.

== Box office ==
The film opened #4 behind The Matrix Revolutions, Freaky Friday, and 21 Grams, grossing $4,531,492 pesos ($398,023 USD) on its opening weekend in Mexico. The film later bombed at the domestic box office, due to an unsuccessful competition with more-successful animated releases in Mexico.

== Music ==
La Magia Está Dentro de Ti
No.	Title	Artist	Length
1.	"Un Amigo Así"	Ha*Ash	3:59
2.	"Sigo Buscándote"	Oscar Schwebel	3:40
3.	"Siempre"	Kabah	3:48
4.	"Mayonesa"	Chocoboys	3:51
5.	"Sube Que Baja"	El Círculo	2:57
6.	"Aserejé"	Las Ketchup	3:32
7.	"El Baile Del Gorila"	Melody	3:08
8.	"Shabadaba"	OV7	3:54
9.	"Sinfonía Inconclusa en la Mar"	Piero	4:22
10.	"El Gusanito"	Real Chicano	2:07
11.	"El Patio de Mi Casa"	Tatiana	3:25
