= Las Aventuras de Oliver Twist =

1987 animated feature film

- VHS cover
- Directed by: Fernando Ruiz
- Written by: Charles Dickens (novel)
- Based on: Oliver Twist by Charles Dickens
- Release date: 1987
- Running time: 93 min.
- Country: Mexico
- Language: Spanish

Las Aventuras de Oliver Twist is a 1987 Spanish-language animated film directed by Fernando Ruiz. It is based on the 1838 novel Oliver Twist by Charles Dickens. It was the final animated film made in Mexico until 2003, but one year after Katy, Kiki y Koko (Katy Meets the Aliens) was released.

== Voice cast ==
- Rocio Garcel – Oliver
- Lilia Sixtos – Nancy
- Juan A. Edwards - Truhar
- Yamil Atala – Sweble
- Rocio Prado – Villi Kent and Susana
- Patricia Acevedo – Michele and Rosa
- Eduardo Liñán – Bill Sikes
- Juan Domingo – Fagin and Bumble
- Alvaro Tarcicio – Tuck
- Narciso Busquets – Brownlow
- Velia Vegar – Bedwin
- Jorge Roig – Mortimer
- Esteban Siller – Lesborne
- Carmen Donadio – Pani Mann
- Liza Willert – Sally and Dama
- Emilio Querrero – Limbkins
- Armando Rendis – Rossi
- Monica Elizabeth – Polly
- Ana Maria Grey – Oliver's mother
- Carlos Segunto – Mesero
- Eduardo Borja – Caballero
- Fernando Ruiz – Cosinero
- Arturo Casanova – Policia
- J. Manuel Rosano - Narrador
