= Colmenero =

Colmenero is a Spanish surname. Notable people with the surname include:

- Francisco Colmenero (born 1932), Mexican voice actor and director
- Francisco Ferreira Colmenero (born 1967), Spanish footballer known as Patxi Ferreira
- José Manuel Colmenero Crespo (born 1973), Spanish footballer
- Juan Ruiz de Colmenero (1596–1663), Spanish bishop
- Alicia Diana Santos Colmenero (born 1950), Mexican voice actress
