= Oruga =

Oruga may refer to:

- Oruga, Spanish for a caterpillar
- Oruga, an articulated bus or "caterpillar" bus
- "Katy La Oruga", a special single by Lucerito
