= De Mercado =

De Mercado is a Spanish surname. It is believed to have first appeared around the Spanish provinces of Segovia and Valladolid. Its roots are most likely in Old Castile or Andalusia. Some variants of the name are Mercado, Mercaddo, Meradoo, Mercados, Mercadors, Mercadons, de Mercado, deMercado, Demercado, and DeMercado. The name means 'market' in Spanish and goes back to Latin mercatus, with the same meaning. Although not a Portuguese surname, the de Mercado name can also be found in Portugal to a limited extent, as it was brought over there from Spain generations ago. Some of the first settlers of this family name or some of its variants were among the early explorers of the New World were many who settled in the Caribbean and Central America. They included Gutierre De Mercado who came to the Spanish Main in 1534 and Gabriel de Mercado who arrived in New Spain in 1578. The name was brought into England in the wake of the Norman Invasion of 1066, and Roger Marcand, recorded in the year 1202 in County Berkshire, appears to be the first of the name on record. Roger Mauchaunt appears in Yorkshire in 1219, and Ranulph le Marchand was documented in 1240 in County Essex. The associated coat of arms is recorded in Cronistas Reyes de Armas de España. The heraldic office dates back to the 16th century. They have judicial powers in matters of nobiliary titles, and also serve as a registration office for pedigrees and grants of arms.

Mercado is also a Sephardic name given to or assumed by someone who had escaped some great danger or recovered from a life-threatening illness; he was 'bought' or taken under the protection of a relative or friend and had his name changed to Merkado to confuse the Angel of Death, who, it was believed, would make further attempts to take the life of which he had been baulked.

== Some well-known (de) Mercados ==
- Arturo Mercado, Mexican voice actor
- Bernardo Mercado, Colombian heavy-weight boxer
- César Mercado, Puerto Rican marathon runner
- Diego Fernández de Mercado, Spanish governor of Jamaica in 1586 (during Spanish rule)
- Emari Demercado (born 1999), American football player
- Emiliano Mercado del Toro, Puerto Rican centenarian who, at his death, was the world's oldest living person
- José Protacio Rizal Mercado y Alonso Realonda popularly known as Dr. Jose Rizal, National Hero of the Philippines
- Orlando Mercado, Puerto Rican baseball player
- Orlando S. Mercado also known as Orly Mercado, Philippine politician and journalist
- Oscar Mercado, Colombian-American baseball player
- Sergio Ramírez Mercado, Nicaraguan writer and intellectual
- Syesha Mercado, American singer
- Walter Mercado also known as Shanti Ananda, Puerto Rican astrologer
- Sir Frederick Mercado, is a Puerto Rican–American intellectual, polymath, entrepreneur and criminal justice reform advocate. He was a Libertarian candidate for the Michigan State House of Representatives, a public safety official, and a multidisciplinary professional. He is currently serving as a First Lieutenant in the Civil Air Patrol, assigned duty to the Battle Creek Cadet Squadron (GLR-MI-250) and holds office as Assistant Chief of Staff (ACoS) of the Michigan Wing.

== See also ==
- Spanish naming customs
- Puerto Rican rock music#1950s and 1960s
