= ¡The Fall Guy-Yi-Yi! =

- The Simpsons episode
- Promotional poster for the episode
- Episode no.: Season 37; Episode 12
- Directed by: Timothy Bailey
- Written by: Cesar Mazariegos
- Production code: 37ABF06
- Original air date: December 28, 2025

Guest appearances
- Patricia Acevedo as Channel Ocho crew member and Mexican girl; Alejandro González Iñárritu as himself; Johnny Knoxville as himself; Claudia Motta as Mexican grandmother and Channel Ocho executive; Humberto Vélez as Bumblebee Man and himself

Episode chronology
← Previous "Parahormonal Activity"	Next → "Seperance"
- The Simpsons season 37

"¡The Fall Guy-Yi-Yi!" is the twelfth episode of the thirty-seventh season of the American animated television series The Simpsons, and the 802nd episode overall. It aired in the United States on Fox on December 28, 2025. The episode was written by Cesar Mazariegos and directed by Timothy Bailey.

In this episode, Homer agrees to be Bumblebee Man's stunt double to impress Bart. Alejandro González Iñárritu, Johnny Knoxville, Patricia Acevedo, Claudia Motta, and Humberto Vélez (the latter three being the Latin American voice actors for Lisa, Bart and Marge, and Homer, respectively) are billed as "Special Guest Voices". Los Tigres del Norte appear as themselves and perform a song. The episode received mixed reviews from English-language critics, while it was positively received in the Latin American market. "¡The Fall Guy-Yi-Yi!" was dedicated in memory of Rob Reiner (who previously guest-starred in "Million Dollar Abie") who was stabbed to death along with his wife on December 14, 2025.

== Plot ==
At a youth baseball game, Comic Book Guy taunts Üter, which causes his father to attack him. The children remark that the father is a "badass". When Bart claims Homer is also one, the children argue against it and are proven correct to Bart's disappointment. He invites Homer to attend an MMA fight. When the arena audience jeers Homer on the jumbotron for not being "macho", Bart argues with him until he falls down the stairs and knocks out the fighters.

Impressed, Bumblebee Man invites Homer and Bart to a meal. He explains how he immigrated from Mexico to be a serious actor. Working as a janitor for the Spanish language television station, he experienced a series of accidents and emerged from a costume rack in a bumblebee suit. He is hired to perform comedic stunts, but his body can no longer tolerate the abuse, leading to a drop in ratings. He asks Homer to be his stunt double and he agrees to impress Bart.

Homer signs a non-disclosure agreement so Bumblebee Man's fans will not know he no longer performs stunts. Bart is impressed but cannot tell anyone because of the NDA. Lisa is worried about a white man impersonating a Mexican, and Marge is worried about Homer being hurt. Although the show's ratings improve, Homer's injuries start getting worse. Feeling guilty for being a fraud, Bumblebee Man considers ending the show until he is invited to star in a film.

Filming in Mexico, Homer performs the stunts in a green screen body suit, but his family is worried about his health. When news breaks that Bumblebee Man is not performing his own stunts, Marge, Bart, and Lisa all confess they leaked the story for Homer's sake. Bumblebee Man denies the story and invites fans to see him fall down the steps of Teotihuacan. At the pyramid, Homer tries to stop him by saying his fans do not want to see him hurt but just want to laugh at him. Homer says he did the stunts to impress Bart but learns that he should not care what Bart thinks. After they hug and cry from their breakthroughs, they both slip on their tears and fall down the steps.

As they celebrate their survival with tacos, Homer and Bumblebee Man notice everyone is a Calaca. When they ask one Calaca if they are dead, the Calaca checks them out and tells them that they are in a coma where they will be for a while.

During the credits, photographic stills from this episode are shown.

== Production ==
Writer Cesar Mazariego described the episode as "a love letter of sorts to our Latin American fans, and to Mexican culture specifically".

Humberto Vélez, who is the Mexican Spanish voice of Homer, guest starred as Accented Voice/Bumblebee Man, Patricia Acevedo guest starred as Various, and Claudia Motta guest starred as Various. Vélez, Acevedo and Motta voice Homer, Lisa and Bart Simpson in the Latin Spanish dub of the show, respectively. Director Alejandro González Iñárritu and stunt performer Johnny Knoxville appeared as themselves. The band Los Tigres del Norte appeared as themselves and performed the song "El Corrido de Pedro y Homero".

== Release ==
The episode aired simultaneously in the United States in all time zones at 8:31 pm ET/5:31 pm PT following a special episode of the television series Animal Control.

== Cultural references ==
The episode title is a reference to the 1980s television series The Fall Guy and its 2024 film adaptation.

== Reception ==
Marcus Gibson of Bubbleblabber gave the episode an 8 out of 10. He liked the physical comedy in the episode and the commentary of stunt work in the entertainment industry. He also highlighted Humberto Vélez's replacement voice for Bumblebee Man for the episode. Mike Celestino of Laughing Place thought "a lot of" the episode was "ridiculous", but he liked the jokes. He said the episode reminded him of episodes from the classic seasons. Marisa Roffman of Give Me My Remote felt the story with Bumblebee Man was not strong enough to be the main plot of the episode since there have been many episodes featuring Homer doing physical stunts. Nick Valdez of Comicbook.com ranks the episode number 5 on his list "All Episodes of The Simpsons Season 37, Ranked Worst to Best." He said, "It reveals how close they are in terms of personality (even Homer's Spanish voice actor was chosen to voice Bumblebee Man in the episode), but also that they have a super fun dynamic that The Simpsons would do well to revisit someday. The scope of the episode's ending seems to suggest it's probably a one-off idea, but it's still a very good adventure."

Many critics and fans from Latin America praised the participation of the Latin cast of The Simpsons, especially Humberto Vélez's cameo. Diego Valadéz of IGN said the cameo was important because "For the Spanish-speaking public, Humberto Vélez is an institution. Seeing him participate in a script that allows him to showcase his classic nuances has rekindled interest in the new seasons," meanwhile, the newspaper El Universal praised the phrase "This man's pain takes away my own sorrows" during the scene. Rubén Martínez, from AS, praised the episode for officially recognizing Homer's name in Latin America as "Homero," given the ongoing debate on social media between Latinos and Spaniards about the issue. He concluded: "What makes this episode special is not simply the explicit use of Homer's name—unlike other instances where it was merely a nod or an isolated joke—but rather its respectful approach towards a significant portion of his fandom."
