= Don Catarino y su apreciable familia =

Mexican comic strip series

Don Catarino
- Don Catarino y su apreciable familia character
- First appearance: "El Heraldo de Mexico"; (January 1, 1921)
- Last appearance: 1960
- Created by: Fernández Benedicto (script); Salvador Pruneda (design)
- Designed by: Salvador Pruneda

In-universe information
- Significant other: Ligia (Wife)
- Children: Ulogio (son); Tanasia (Daughter)
- Origin: Silao, Guanajuato
- Nationality: Mexican

In other Media
- Short Film: Don Catarino (1934)
- Comic book series: Don Catarino (1954) (14 issues) (List of Issues)
- Original Comic series: Don Catarino y su apreciable familia (1921 – 1948)

Don Catarino y su apreciable familia (lit. Don Catarino and his esteemed family or simply Don Catarino) was a Mexican comic strip series created by Carlos Fernández Benedicto (script) and Salvador Pruneda (illustrations), and was first published on January 1, 1921, in the Sunday newspaper El Heraldo de México and later in the newspaper El Nacional^{[es]} until 1948. Don Catarino is known to be the first long-running comic strip in Mexico. The main protagonist, Don Catarino, got his first animated short film in 1934 of the same name, but the film is lost and only one screenshot exists. In 1954, Don Catarino got his first comic book series which had 14 issues.

== Characters ==
- Don Catarino: the main protagonist of the comic strip. He is an ordinary man, originally from Silao, Guanajuato, who decides to move to Mexico City with his family.
- Ligia: Don Catarino's wife
- Ulogio: Don Catarino and Ligia's son
- Tanasia: Don Catarino and Ligia's daughter
- Alien: There is also an unnamed alien character who appeared in the 1954 series.

== History ==
=== 1921 – 1923: Creation and fame ===
Don Catarino emerged at the end of the armed phase of the Mexican Revolution. At that time, there was an attempt to construct a cultural identity using indigenous elements considered distinctly Mexican, but simultaneously, elements of the American way of life were beginning to be integrated into the national culture. In the comic strip, with illustrations by Pruneda, North American influences are evident, especially from the comic strips of Frederick Burr Opper and George McManus. Fernández Benedicto based his design on "Don Catarino Culantro," who had appeared in a series of satirical articles published in La Risa. In Don Catarino, Carlos Fernández Benedicto, writing under the pseudonym Hipólito Zendejas, revived the colloquial language of Mexican Spanish, employing provincial turns of phrase rarely used in cities. Popular sayings, humorous expressions, and mischievous antics were frequent. The comic strip's success led to a continuation, and the characters ventured beyond Mexico into distant lands like Europe, Africa, and the Pacific islands, where absurd stories unfolded, such as Mexican colonialism in a territory inhabited by cannibals who were forced to use a Spanish riddled with spelling errors. The comic strip discontinued in 1923 when the newspaper El Heraldo was shut down due to its support for the Delahuertista rebellion.

=== 1926 – 1960s: Popularity and discontinuation ===
After a brief stint in El Demócrata in 1926, Don Catarino appeared in the pages of El Nacional, where it remained until its final demise. During its time in El Nacional, the strip was written exclusively by Salvador Pruneda, who tried to make the scripts as similar as possible to those of Zendejas. In 1934, Don Catarino was adapted to a short animated film, but the film is currently lost. In 1954, a comic book titled Don Catarino emerged, published by Salvador Pruneda himself, of which only a few issues managed to reach the market. The comic strip series ended in the 1960s, making it the first long-running comic series In Mexico.

== Animated short ==
=== Origins ===
In 1919, Salvador Pruneda had his first contact with Cartoonists in Hollywood, where he met other Mexicans who worked in the animation industry, such as Bismarck Mier and Salvador Patiño. On January 1, 1921, he created the comic strip series Don Catarino y su apreciable familia (Don Catarino and his esteemed family). In 1923, he attended the first sound film tests in Hollywood and collaborated with Walt Disney.

=== Development ===
When he returned to Mexico in 1928, he had acquired sufficient technical expertise to establish a new studio that produced newsreels. Bismarck Mier and Salvador Patiño collaborated with Salvador Pruneda to make an animated short film featuring Don Catarino in 1934. Carlos Sandoval, who met Pruneda and his collaborators when they were producing this short, claims that he saw eight or ten seconds of the experiment. The film was left unfinished and unfortunately remained as an attempt. The film is entirely lost and there is only one screenshot found online.

== Comic Book series ==
in 1954, Salvador Pruneda decided to revive the character to a Comic book series called Don Catarino. The series released 14 issues. Each issue costed 60 cents. The series became unsuccessful. After those 14 issues, Pruneda decided to end the series entirely.

=== Issues ===
- Issue 1 (July 25, 1954) – Don Catarino is seen holding a pistol in the cover.
- Issue 2 (August 1, 1954) – Don Catarino shows his muscles in the cover.
- Issue 3 (August 8, 1954) – Tanasia, Don Catarino's daughter, does an experiment in the cover.
- Issue 4 (August 15, 1954) – Don Catarino is seen doing an investigation in the cover.
- Issue 5 (August 22, 1954) – Lost
- Issue 6 (August 29, 1954) – the recurring alien character appears in the cover.
- Issue 7 (September 5, 1954) – A thief is trying to murder the unnamed alien character in the cover.
- Issue 8 (September 12, 1954) – Don Catarino is seen holding the Mexican flag on the cover.
- Issue 9 (September 19, 1954) – Don Catarino dresses up as an alien on the cover.
- Issue 10 (September 26, 1954) – Lost
- Issue 11 (October 3, 1954) – Lost
- Issue 12 (October 10, 1954) – Lost
- Issue 13 (October 17, 1954) – Lost
- Issue 14 (October 24, 1954) – Lost

== Legacy ==
At the time the comic strip appeared, newspaper readers, primarily members of the urban middle class, preferred American comic strips. However, the emergence and longevity of "Don Catarino and His Esteemed Family" demonstrated that it was possible to use humorous and colloquial Mexican language in a comic strip, at a time when dialectal turns of phrase that differed from standard Spanish were considered uncultured in Mexico. The use of colloquial Spanish and local color would be reflected in other comic strips, and subsequently throughout the entire history of Mexican comics. In the words of Armando Bartra, "Don Catarino is a low-budget "Bringing Up Father," but it doesn't diminish the homage to McManus. The Zendejas-Pruneda duo also creates a distinctly local comic style, combining characters with native features, speech, and idiosyncrasies with outlandish adventures in the usual exotic landscapes of international comics. Thus, in keeping with the times of nationalistic reaffirmation and cultural openness to the outside world, the paradigmatic Mexican charro becomes cosmopolitan."

Although Don Catarino's readership was restricted to newspaper readers and never reached a mass audience, its success as a comic strip led to the appearance in 1922 of a column in El Heraldo entitled "The Memoirs of Don Catarino" where the character gave his opinion on the events of national life.

The circus actor, the comedian Eusebio Torres Pirrín, adopted the nickname Don Catarino in honor of the comic strip hero.

== See also ==
- Mexican animation
- Comics in Mexico
