= Héctor Indriago =

Venezuelan voice actor

- Born: Héctor Javier Indriago Pérez; May 10, 1979 (age 47); San Cristóbal, Venezuela
- Other names: Latin Batman; Batman Latino
- Occupations: Voice actor; Director; voice-over announcer
- Years active: 1999–present

Héctor Javier Indriago Pérez (born October 10, 1979), also known as the Batman Latino (The Latin Batman) is a Venezuelan voice actor and voice-over announcer. He is best known for voicing the DC Comics superhero Batman in various animated media since 2004, Gustavo Rocque in Big Time Rush, Helio in the Winx Club franchise, Jerry Smith in Rick and Morty, Trent in the Total Drama franchise, Ban Mido in GetBackers, Ira in Fullmetal Alchemist, Van Hohenheim in Fullmetal Alchemist: Brotherhood, among others. He began dubbing in late 1999 and early 2000.

He is the nephew of veteran actor Framk Maneiro, who also does dubbing, and was the first voice actor for Batman in an animated series.

== Career ==
Born in San Cristóbal, he gained a B.A. in Advertising and Acting. He works in theater, television, advertising, dubbing, puppets and music.

=== Film ===
Year	Title	Role	Notes
2008	Batman: Gotham Knight	Bruce Wayne / Batman	Voice, direct-to-video
2010	Superman/Batman: Apocalypse	Bruce Wayne / Batman	
2012	Justice League: Doom	Bruce Wayne / Batman	
2013	Justice League: The Flashpoint Paradox	Thomas Wayne, Bruce Wayne	
2014	Batman: Assault on Arkham	Bruce Wayne / Batman	Voice,
2015	Batman vs. Robin	Bruce Wayne / Batman	Voice, direct-to-video
2016	Batman: The Killing Joke	Bruce Wayne / Batman	Voice, limited theatrical release
2017	Batman and Harley Quinn	Bruce Wayne / Batman	Voice, direct-to-video
2019	Justice League vs. the Fatal Five	Bruce Wayne / Batman	Voice, direct-to-video
2022	Justice League: Crisis on Infinite Earths – Part One	Bruce Wayne / Batman	Voice, direct-to-video
2023	Justice League: Crisis on Infinite Earths – Part Two	Bruce Wayne / Batman	Voice, direct-to-video
2024	Justice League: Crisis on Infinite Earths – Part Three	Bruce Wayne / Batman (Earth 12)	Voice, direct-to-video

=== Television ===
Year	Title	Role	Notes
2001–04	Justice League	additional voices	Voice
2004–06	Justice League Unlimited	Joe Chill	voice role
2004–08	The Batman	Bruce Wayne / Batman	Voice, main role
2010	Batman: The Brave and the Bold	Batman of Zur-En-Arrh, Phantom Stranger	Voice, 2 episodes
