= Top Cat: The Movie =

2011 animated film by Alberto Mar

- Mexican theatrical release poster
- Spanish: Don Gato y su Pandilla
- Directed by: Alberto Mar
- Screenplay by: Tim McKeon; Kevin Seccia
- Based on: Top Cat by Hanna-Barbera
- Produced by: Fernando de Fuentes Sainz; José C. García de Letona; José Luis Massa
- Starring: Raúl Anaya; Jorge Arvizu; Jesús Guzmán; Eduardo Garza; Mario Castañeda; Ricardo Tejedo
- Edited by: Andrés Fernández
- Music by: Leoncio Lara
- Production companies: Ánima Estudios; Illusion Studios
- Distributed by: Warner Bros. Pictures (Mexico); Distribution Company (Argentina)
- Release date: September 16, 2011
- Running time: 91 minutes
- Countries: Mexico; Argentina
- Language: English
- Budget: $6 million
- Box office: MX$112.25 million (US$14.7 million)

Top Cat: The Movie (known in Spanish as Don Gato y su Pandilla, "Top Cat and His Gang") is a 2011 animated action comedy film based on the Hanna-Barbera cartoon series Top Cat, which originally ran from 1961 to 1962 on ABC in the United States. Directed by Alberto Mar from a screenplay by Tim McKeon and Kevin Seccia, the film serves as the series finale of the show.

Produced by Ánima Estudios and Illusion Studios, the film was first released to theaters in Mexico on September 16, 2011, in 2D and 3D formats, distributed by Warner Bros. Pictures. The film was later released in the United Kingdom on 1 June 2012, distributed by Vertigo Films, where it grossed £2.8 million, making it the highest-grossing Mexican film in the region. The film later received a limited release in the United States on 2 August 2013 by Viva Pictures, with the voices of Rob Schneider and Danny Trejo as Lou Strickland and Griswald respectively.

Though it received negative reviews, the film was a major commercial success, earning $43.5 million pesos on its opening weekend at the domestic box office and held the record as one of the biggest box-office openings in Mexican cinema history. The film grossed a total of $112.25 million pesos domestically and $14.7 million worldwide.

An animated prequel to the film and the series, titled Top Cat Begins, was released on October 30, 2015 without achieving the box office success of the first film.

== Plot ==
During lunch with Benny, Top Cat spots a female cat walking by them. Excusing himself, Top Cat quickly runs after the female cat, interrupted by Griswald, but soon gets him out of the way and meets up with the female cat, who introduces herself as Trixie. While she finds him amusing, an alley cat isn't her type.

At the alley, Top Cat catches news of the Maharajah of Peekajoo, known for his generosity and his rubies are just what Top Cat needs to impress Trixie. Top Cat and his gang head to the Connity Hall to meet the Maharajah, running into an obnoxious man named Lou Strickland. The gang steal his tickets and get him sent away. While the gang distracts Officer Dibble who is the Maharaja's escort, Top Cat makes a bet with the Maharaja and gets out of him a Maharaja Talk 5000 device with many functions, as the Maharaja hasn't any rubies.

The next morning, Officer Dibble is summoned to the police station to work for the Chief's son-in-law Strickland, who is taking over for the retired Chief. Strickland has replaced the staff with robots which he believes are more competent. Top Cat thwarts Strickland's attempt to evict him, preventing Strickland from getting the Mayor's funding for a robot police army. Upon discovering that they met, Strickland uses Trixie to keep Top Cat away from the alley while he carries out his revenge plan. Top Cat returns to the alley, getting shunned by his gang, arrested by police and, after a very brief trial (due to the judge having seen the false evidence before), convicted and sent to Dog Jail on a charge of stealing money from an orphanage.

With the arrest of Top Cat, Strickland is granted the Mayor's funding and establishes a robot police army and a major scale surveillance camera system that restricts privacy for the city. Meanwhile, Top Cat tries to keep a low profile in dog jail but later becomes popular, having turned the jail into a paradise for the convicts. As for Top Cat's gang, they are struggling and begin to express their disbelief in him, which Top Cat notices from one of the security cameras.

Strickland abuses his authority and starts coming up with ridiculous laws to take absurd amounts of money off people for everything they do, intending to spend it on making himself even more 'handsome'. Tired of Strickland's tyranny, Trixie quits her job and turns to Officer Dibble, showing him evidence that Strickland used a robot Top Cat to rob the orphanage and frame the real Top Cat for it. However, Strickland arrives and reveals his true intentions to Dibble, and that he's not the old chief's son-in-law. Dibble escapes, but Trixie is captured by the police robots.

After Dibble tells the gang what really happened, they all head for Big Gus to help them break Top Cat out of prison, as he owes Top Cat. Big Gus leads them through an underground passage to the dog jail and leaves. The gang apologizes for their doubts about Top Cat. With their cover blown by the dogs knowing they've got cats with them, the gang and Dibble escape through a sewer hole arriving at Strickland's HQ.

The gang infiltrates the building in robot guises finding that Strickland has imprisoned all of the citizens and stolen the city's cash. While Dibble distracts Strickland by getting himself captured, the gang disguises themselves as robots to make their way to Strickland's control center, but they are locked in Strickland's vault after having tripped a silent alarm, with Top Cat remaining outside. When Strickland arrives, he orders Top Cat to be annihilated by the robots. As a single robot enters, Top Cat realizes the whole security system was manufactured by the Maharajah of Peekajoo. Top Cat takes out the Maharajah Talk 5000 which presumably controls all robots to get Strickland. In a panic, Strickland self-destructs the robot army except for the single one, revealed to be Fancy-Fancy still in his robot guise. All of the citizens (including Dribble and Top Cat's gang) are released in the self-destruction process, and Strickland is arrested and sent to Dog Jail as punishment for his crimes.

Top Cat and Trixie renew their relationship, Officer Dibble is promoted as the new Chief of Police, the gang enjoy themselves, and finally, Griswald asks for a place in Top Cat's gang, which Top Cat accepts, ending the film and the series.

== Voice cast ==
=== English cast ===
English name	Voice actor
Top Cat/Choo Choo/Brain/Big Gus/Maharajah of Pookajee/Lobster	Jason Harris Katz
Lou Strickland (U.S. version only)	Rob Schneider
Benny	Chris Edgerly
Spook	Benjamin Diskin
Fancy-Fancy	Matthew Piazzi
Officer Dibble	Bill Lobley
Griswald (U.S. version only)	Danny Trejo
Trixie	Melissa Disney
Robot/Gorilla	Fred Tatasciore
Judge/Police Chief/Mayor	Bob Kaliban

=== Latin American Spanish dub cast ===
Spanish name	Voice actor
Don Gato	Raúl Anaya
Benito B. Bodoque	Jorge Arvizu
Cucho	Jorge Arvizu
Panza	Eduardo Garza
Espanto	Luis Fernando Orozco
Demóstenes	Jesús Guzmán
Oficial Carlitos Matute	Sebastian Llapúr
Lucas Buenrostro	Mario Castañeda
Rugelio	Ricardo Tejedo
Trixie	Rosalba Sotelo
Juez	Rolando de Castro
Jefe de Policia	Israel Magaña
Alcalde	Francisco Colmenero

== Production ==
=== Development ===
On February 26, 2011, Warner Bros. Pictures Mexico, Ánima Estudios, Illusion Studios announced that the film would be in production, to celebrate the show's 50th anniversary. The film took a total of 34 months to develop.

=== Writing ===
While the production of the film mainly took place in Mexico, Warner Bros. suggested that the film was written by Americans, when Tim McKeon and Kevin Seccia wanted to write a familiar story to match the spirit of the original TV series. Before writing the screenplay, they reviewed the show's set of the 1960s. They wrote several versions of the script until they finished the final draft the script. It took them six months to write. Jesús Guzmán, a Mexican comedian and actor who provides the Spanish voice of Demostenes (Brain), adapted and translated the script in Spanish.

=== Animation ===
It was originally rumored to be a live-action/animated hybrid, but it was later confirmed to be a 2D/CG animated feature. Animated in Adobe Flash with animated backgrounds, the animation was done by Ánima Estudios in Mexico, while post-production (including the CGI backgrounds) and stereoscopic 3D services were done at Illusion Studios in Argentina.

=== Background development and setting ===
Alberto Mar, the film's director, did a scouting in New York City in 2011 and took pictures of the city's buildings, alleys, and drains. He also used locations that were not featured in the TV series, such as Times Square.

=== Character development ===
During character development, all of the film's characters had to be approved by Warner Bros. Animation. The goal was for the characters to look like they were drawn in style of other Hanna-Barbera works. Ánima Estudios created new characters that were not featured in the series, such as Trixie, Lucas Buenrostro (Lou Strickland), the army of robots, and over 100 incidental characters.

=== Cast ===
While the film features a voice cast different from the original series, Jorge Arvizu reprises his role as Benny and Choo Choo from the Spanish version of the show The U.S. version casts actors, Rob Schneider and Danny Trejo, dubbing over Jason Harris voice roles as Lou Strickland and Griswald, respectively, from the international English versions of the film.

=== Music ===
The film's original score was composed by Leoncio Lara. The TV show's theme song was featured in the film. The song, "New York Groove" by Ace Frehley, was also featured in the film's trailer and end credits.

== Release ==
This film was released theatrically in Mexico and parts of South America on September 16, 2011, in Digital 3D and regular 2D format. The film's teaser premiered on April 15, 2011, and was shown during the Mexican screenings of Hop. On January 23, 2012, Vertigo Films announced that the film would be released in the United Kingdom on June 1, 2012 (formerly August 20, 2012) in 2D, Digital 3D, and RealD 3D theaters. A UK teaser trailer was released on April 5, 2012. The film was released in select theaters and VOD in the United States from Viva Pictures on August 2, 2013. The U.S. trailer was released on May 7, 2013. The MPAA gave this film a PG rating for "some mild rude content".

=== Home media ===
The original Latin American version was released on Blu-ray and DVD on December 2, 2011, from Warner Home Video International as well on Blu-ray 3D in Brazil, distributed by PlayArte Home Entertainment, while the UK version was released on Blu-ray and Blu-ray 3D on October 15, 2012, distributed by Entertainment One. It was the first film from Ánima Estudios to be released on Blu-ray. The film was released in the United States on DVD on September 3, 2013.

== Reception ==
=== Critical response ===
On the review aggregator website Rotten Tomatoes, 14% of 14 critics' reviews are positive, with an average rating of 3.20/10. To date, it is the lowest-rated film produced by Ánima Estudios. Though the original Spanish version of the film was received mostly positive reviews in Mexico and Latin America, the English dub of the film was panned in both the United Kingdom and the United States.

Mark Kermode gave the film a negative review and criticized the film for its lack of originality and poor animation quality. Kermode felt that the movie failed to capture the charm of the original TV series and described it as a “cash-in” that didn’t offer anything new or engaging for audiences. Peter Bradshaw of The Guardian gave the English film 1 out of 5 stars, saying "It's the bottom of the heap, and it frankly looks cheap, the disaster of the year is – Top Cat". Derek Adams of Time Out London also gave the English film 1 out of five stars, writing, "a pity, then, that the key elements – storyline, dialogue, comedy value – are so woefully ineffectual. An air of boredom permeated the screening I attended and laughs were universally non-existent." Colin Kennedy of Metro criticized the English film, calling it "a dog's dinner of a film which will bore new viewers and disappoint old ones" and "post-Pixar kids will be bored rigid." Rob of The Shiznit gave this 1 out of 5 stars and wrote, "It looks like Top Cat, sounds like Top Cat, but it doesn't feel like Top Cat. It's as if a Mexican film company (Ánima Estudios) has taken an iconic American cartoon and slapped together a budget version... oh, wait, that's exactly what's happened."

Bethany Rutter of Little White Lies criticized the English film saying that "it's heroically unfunny, the lame script is one of many sticking points. Awkward, clunky and predictable, it propels the film forward at a pace that manages to be both deathly slow and annoyingly jumpy." Geoffrey Macnab of The Independent gave the English film 2 out of 5 stars and said that "neither the voice work (much of it done by Jason Harris) nor the animation is distinctive. Officer Dibble has only a marginal role. The use of 3D seems entirely tokenistic (an excuse to hike up ticket prices rather than an artistic decision.)" On the positive side, Matthew Turner of ViewLondon enjoyed the English film, saying that " This movie provides a handful of decent laughs, though some of the jokes are a bit dodgy, the 3D effects are entirely superfluous and younger children might be a little bored." Eddie Harrison of The List also gave the English film a positive reaction, saying that "adults looking for undemanding fare for their kids may find Top Cat's brand of sass, irreverence and cheeky charm offer a persuasive alternative to today's crasser children's entertainments."

=== Box office ===
==== Mexico and Argentina ====
This film has earned $40.7 million in Mexico and grossed a total of $112.25 million pesos. It has also become one of the biggest box office openings in Mexican cinema history. In Argentina, it opened #5 on its opening weekend, earning $0.7 million and grossed a total of $3.3 million.

==== Brazil ====
In Brazil, this film opened at #7 behind, earning R$0.9 million. It grossed a total of R$2.2 million.

==== United Kingdom and Spain ====
The UK release of this film opened at #7 at the weekend box office with £0.4 million from 452 theaters throughout the country, and grossed a total of £2.8 million. In Spain, this film earned €34,085 on its opening weekend and grossed a total of €96,848.

==== Internationally ====
This film grossed $0.3 million in Uruguay, ₺0.28 million in Turkey, and $2.4 million in Peru.

==== United States ====
There is currently no box office data for the film, but it is one of the highest-grossing independent animated films released in the United States.

=== Accolades ===
In 2012 it was nominated at the 13th Golden Trailer Awards as Best Foreign Animation/Family Trailer for "Trailer 1" on YouTube and "Trailer 2" on YouTube.

On the same year the movie won into the 9th edition of Canacine Awards as Best Animated Feature Film and Best Advertising Campaign for a Mexican Film.

== Prequel ==
An animated prequel to both the film and the original series was released on October 30, 2015 in Mexico, with Ánima Estudios once again producing.

== See also ==
- List of films based on Hanna-Barbera cartoons
