= Gwen Farrell =

American actress (1932–2026)

- Born: November 29, 1932; Austin, Texas, U.S.
- Died: April 30, 2026 (aged 93); Sherman Oaks, California, U.S.
- Occupations: Actress, boxing referee
- Notable work: M*A*S*H

Gwendolyn Yancey Farrell (November 29, 1932 – April 30, 2026) was an American actress and a boxing referee. She was known for her work on the television show M.A.S.H. and Billy Jack Goes to Washington.

== Life and career ==
She acted as various nurses in a recurring serial role on M.A.S.H. for 26 episodes, including the finale. She was the first licensed woman boxing referee and also one of the first women boxing referees to officiate the World title fight. She also appeared in many films, including Coffy, Earthquake, Billy Jack Goes to Washington, Black Gunn, and Soylent Green.

Farrell died in Sherman Oaks, Los Angeles, California, on April 30, 2026, at the age of 93. She was survived by her husband, Frank Adair, and son, Keith Farrell, who announced her death. A GoFundMe page was created to raise donations for her funeral expenses.
