= Katy, la oruga =

Mexican-Spanish film series

Katy, la oruga (English: Katy Caterpillar) is a Mexican franchise originating from two 1980s Mexican-Spanish animated films, Katy, la oruga (1984) and Katy, Kiki y Koko (1988).

== History ==
The first Katy film was co-produced by Mexico's Televicine and José Luis Moro's studio in Spain, and began production in 1981. It was made with producer Carlos Sotomayor and a cast of Mexican voice actors. Written by Silvia Roche based on an original story that she wrote entitled Pepina Oruga (Pepina the Caterpillar) which was also a 380-episode radio drama that aired on XEW-AM Radio on Sunday mornings as well as a popular children's book. The film was successfully transferred to the comics, marketable products, prints, and backpacks as well as short musical clips that were shown on Televisa and a video based on the song shown on the popular children and teens TV musical program XE-TU, a serious marketing.

The film's success led to a 1988 sequel called Katy, Kiki y Koko (later known as Katy Meets the Aliens and Katy and the Katerpillar Kids in English), where Katy's children face aliens.

During the success of the movie, the magazine "Discopóster" with Musart Records decided to take advantage by releasing a special single performed by the most successful teenager Mexipop singer at that time in Mexico, Lucerito. The single includes two songs written and composed by Nacho Méndez and Silvia Roche, and produced and directed by Luigi Lazareno.

== Films ==
=== Katy, la oruga ===
Katy, la oruga
- Directed by: José Luis Moro; Santiago Moro
- Production companies: Televicine; Estudios Moro
- Countries: Mexico; Spain

Katy, la oruga (Katy Caterpillar in the English adaptation) is a Mexican-Spanish animated children's film directed by José Luis Moro and Santiago Moro. The story is about a young caterpillar named Katy who lives in a cherry-leaf tree with her three sisters. One day Katy decides that she wants to leave her tree and find out what she really wants to do. She soon meets the spirit of the forest Mother Nature, who tells the young caterpillar that she has to discover what she wants to become. After that Katy starts traveling the forest meeting other animals and insects she had never seen before, learning many new things, making some friends along the way and discovering what she really is: a beautiful butterfly.

==== English-language release ====
Vestron Video distributed the film on home video in the United States as Katy Caterpillar. Barbara Goodson voiced Katy.

==== Characters ====
- Katy Caterpillar (Katy La Oruga) (voiced by Cristina Camargo, English language dub voiced by Barbara Goodson) - The title character and main protagonist of the film. A young caterpillar full of questions and wondering, Katy is new and curious about the world. One day after deciding to leave home and seek her fortune, she meets Mother Nature, the spirit of the forest, who tells Katy to discover what she wants to become. Motivated, she decides to roam the forest and begins meeting different animals and insects, learning about their lifestyles and their natural abilities. After her big adventure in the forest and the city, Katy meets with Mother Nature once again and finally decides to become a "flying flower". The spirit gives her a book about becoming a flying flower and she returns home and begins to knit her cocoon, places herself inside and by the next Spring emerges as a beautiful butterfly.
- Gilbert Mouse (Gilberto Ratón) (voiced by Alfonso Obregón, English language dub voiced by Robert Axelrod) - Katy's new best friend. She and Gilbert first met when the two were trying to escape their predators and hid. After that, the two became fast friends and decided to travel together. Gilbert has wanted to move from his home to a better place and tells Katy that he always wanted to go to the city, so he travels there with her. After their adventures, Gilbert and Katy say goodbye, she gives him a kiss on the cheek and returns home.
- Caterpillars (Orugas) (voiced by Gaby Willer, Patricia Palestino, and Patricia Acevedo, English language dub voiced by Barbara Goodson, Maureen O'Connell, and Wendy Cutler) - Katy's three sisters, who live with her in the cherry tree. They are named Willa, Claudia and Denise in the English dub.
- Spider (Araña) (voiced by Azucena Rodríguez, English language dub voiced by Wendy Cutler) - A spider that Katy meets on the way. She teaches her how to knit her webbing into a spider web. However, Katy accidentally frees some victims that the spider has trapped them in her spider web in the process. The spider is never seen again throughout the rest of the film.
- Chameleons (Camaleones) (voiced by Eduardo Tejedo, English language dub voiced by Bill Capizzi, John Hostetter, and Ardwight Chamberlain) - A group of chameleons that not only can change colors, but also can throw parties, festivities, and celebrations. Katy attempts to change color just like what all of the chameleons can do at first, but then they start making fun of her, and her expense.
- Lizards (Lagartos) - Two lizards that are seen in one scene, in which they are going fishing. Suddenly, one of the chameleons destroyed their fishing boat while he was surfing, making them very angry and blame him for the damage he did.
- Bee No 5344 (Abeja 5344) (voiced by Diana Santos, English language dub voiced by Maureen O'Connell) - A young bee who Katy befriends by helping her gather pollen for her Colony.
- The Queen Bee (La Reina Abeja) (voiced by Gloria Rocha, English language dub voiced by Wendy Cutler) - The ruthless ruler of the Bee Colony who abuses the workers of the Colony and the enslaved Katy by forcing them to work harder.
- Toad (Sapo) (voiced by Alvaro Tarcisio, English language dub voiced by John Hostetter) - The forest curio shopkeeper.
- City Mouse (El Ratón de la Ciudad) (voiced by Luis Bayardo, English language dub voiced by Jan Rabson) - A mouse who, at first, treated Katy and Gilbert rather rudely after they came crashing into his house, but later became good friends and gave Katy and Gilbert a whirlwind tour of the city.
- Chester and Clyde (Chester y Clyde) (voiced by Héctor Lee and Francisco Colmenero, English language dub voiced by Troy Donahue and Hal Smith) - A pair of oafish crows who, at first, were looking to eat Katy and served as minor antagonists. After they were saved by Katy and Gilbert at the tomato cannery, they became eternally grateful and promised to be in their debt by flying them back home from the Big City and never harming them again.
- Goliath the Cat (El Gato) (voiced by Esteban Siller, English language dub voiced by Forrest Tucker) - The main antagonist of the film, who strikes a deal with Chester and Clyde to capture Katy and Gilbert. Almost winding up getting canned at the tomato cannery in the Big City, Goliath gets soaked by Gilbert with a fire hose and ran away, never to be seen again.
- Horse (Caballo) (voiced by Unknown, English language dub voiced by Bill Capizzi) - A talking cart-drawn horse that takes Katy and Gilbert to the Big City. He wears a straw hat.
- Mother Nature (Madre Naturaleza) (voiced by Nancy MacKenzie, English language dub voiced by Barbara Parkins) - The spirit of the forest who gives Katy a book of how to become a "flying flower" (butterfly).

=== Katy, Kiki y Koko ===
Katy, Kiki y Koko ("Katy Meets the Aliens" or "Katy and the Katerpillar Kids" in the English adaptation) is the 1988 sequel to Katy Caterpillar. The story is about Katy, now grown up as a lovely butterfly, and her children, young twin caterpillars named Kiki and Koko, facing off against aliens who came to their forest searching for food - which happens to be inhabitants of the forest. With the help of their friends, Katy, Kiki and Koko are able to defeat Alien X and his crew and save their forest and its inhabitants.

==== Characters ====
- Katy Caterpillar (voiced by Rocío Garcel, English language dub voiced by Unknown) - The protagonist of the film. Katy, now grown up as a lovely butterfly, lives in the same cherry-leaf tree with her two caterpillar children Kiki and Koko. She is now a protective and loving mother who is also somewhat of a worrywart as both of her children start getting into trouble when aliens start to visit. She still has many friends in the forest and tells true stories of her life as a caterpillar to her children.
- Kiki and Koko Caterpillar - Katy's two caterpillar children and protagonists of the film along with their mother. They are twins who always wish to become butterflies and fly in the sky just like their mother. Koko (who wears a sky blue baseball cap with a large capital "K") (voiced by Diana Santos, English language dub voiced by Unknown) is the oldest, bravest, and somewhat mischievous brother while Kiki (who wears a flower bonnet like Katy) (voiced by María Fernanda Morales, English language dub voiced by Cheryl Chase) is the youngest, sweetest, and somewhat naive sister. The two try to find ways to learn how to fly before they are ready and they end up discovering Alien X and his crew, thus informing their mother and friends about the alien invasion.
- Skunk (Zorillo) (voiced by Unknown, English language dub voiced by Unknown) - A grumpy red-nosed skunk that tries to sleep. He usually carries a pillow around with him whenever and wherever he goes. At the end of the film, X successfully captures the skunk, and takes him to his home planet, only to get scared away, along with W, Y, and Z, by the skunk's terrible smell. He is similar to the badger from The Fox and the Hound.
- Bat (Murciélago) - A bat that wears a pilot's helmet and goggles that teaches Kiki and Koko how to fly at first, but then turns out to be their enemy, and plans to eat them both up for dinner. However, X's spaceship scares the bat away, causing him to retreat to his lair, only to never to be seen again throughout the rest of the film.
- The Ants (Los Hormigas) (voiced by Unknown, English language dub voiced by Unknown) - A colony of ants who gathers the food under the tyrannical rule of Boss Soldier Ant.
- Boss Soldier Ant (El Patrón Soldado Hormiga) (voiced by Unknown, English language dub voiced by Unknown) - The leader of the ant colony who rules with an iron fist and abuses the worker ants. He wears a Viking style helmet and carries a staff with a clenched fist on top, which he uses as a defense weapon when the colony is invaded by intruders.
- Gilbert Mouse (Gilberto Ratón) (voiced by Alejandro Villeli, English language dub voiced by Robert Axelrod) - Katy's old, close friend who still resides in the forest with his son Arnold. Gilbert is now a detective/tracker in the forest and seems to follow foot tracks, but easily gets lost or misled. He relies on instinct to help find missing people and seems to have a bag full of different kinds of hats, which he wears for specific occasions. He remains close to his friend Katy.
- Arnold Mouse (Arnulfo Ratón) (voiced by Nando Estevante, English language dub voiced by Unknown) - Gilbert's intelligent, studious and loyal son, and Kiki and Koko's good friend. He is very loyal and obedient to his father and often acts as his assistant. Arnold is almost always seen with a book, mainly one about footprints. He is the first to believe Kiki and Koko about the alien invasion.
- Rosetta Squirrel (Roseta Ardilla) (voiced by Velia Velgar, English language dub voiced by Unknown) - An elderly friend of Katy's, who is quite a chatterbox when a question or topic has been asked and has a passion for knitting.
- Professor Q. Owl (Professor Q. (Keu) Búho) (voiced by Gerarso Moscoso, English language dub voiced by Unknown) - The most intelligent animal in the forest, with a tree full of books and papers. He often gives helpful advice to Katy.
- Aliens W, X, Y and Z (Extraterrestes W, X, Y y Z) - The antagonists of the film. These four mollusk-like aliens are hungry and the only way to survive is to capture and eat creatures from other planets. X (voiced by Esteban Siller, English language dub voiced by Unknown) is the one that leaves to capture the animals of the forest, while W, Y and Z stay behind and watch from afar. W (voiced by Eduardo Liñán, English language dub voiced by Unknown) is the pink/red eye colored alien, X is the green eye colored alien as well as the main antagonist that fires green lightning bolts from his eyes at any victim in his path, which causes him to change himself into the same victim he sees, Y (voiced by Carlos De Pavia, English language dub voiced by Unknown) is the yellow eye colored alien, and Z (voiced by Paco Reséndez, English language dub voiced by Unknown) is the blue eye colored alien.
- Gracko Hawk (Grako Halcón) (voiced by Luis de León, English language dub voiced by Steve Kramer) - A minor antagonist, Gracko is the wild trouble-making delinquent of the forest with a punk mohawk hairstyle. He always harasses its inhabitants, but gets beaten up by them every time.

== Single ==
"Katy, la oruga"

Single by Lucerito
- Released: 1984
- Recorded: 1984
- Genre: Pop, Children
- Label: Musart Records
- Producer: J.S Rosaldo

Lucerito singles chronology
"Contigo" (1984)	"Katy, la oruga" (1984)	"Todo el amor del mundo" (1984)

A special single by Lucerito was released as a gift for the purchase of the Discopóster Magazine. The first edition was released in 1984. The songs from this single were included in the soundtrack of the Spanish-Mexican animated film of 1984 produced by Fabian Arnaud and directed by José Luis Moro and Santiago Moro and is based from an original story by Silvia Roche.

=== Track listing ===
7" vinyl

1. Katy la Oruga - 3:05
2. Un Día Volaré - 2:41
