= Arturo Mercado =

Mexican voice actor (born 1940)

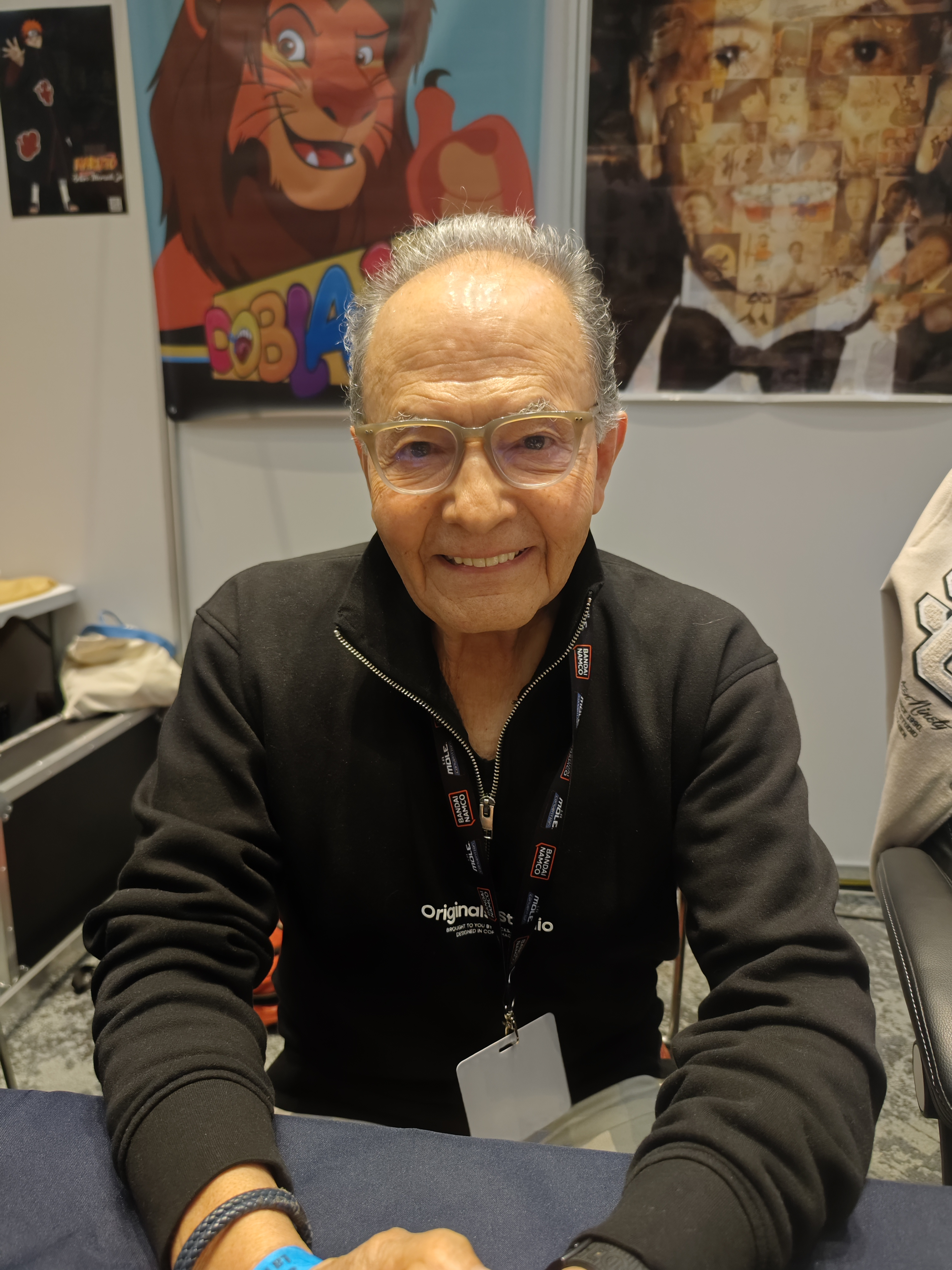
- Born: Arturo Mercado Chacón; December 7, 1940 (age 85); Acámbaro, Guanajuato, Mexico
- Occupation: Voice actor
- Years active: 1963–present
- Children: Arturo Mercado, Jr. Carmen Mercado, Angeles Mercado

Arturo Mercado Chacón (born December 7, 1940) is a Mexican voice actor who has dubbed many movie and television characters to Spanish for the Latin American movie and television market since 1963. He was the husband of Magdalena Leonel de Cervantes and the father of Arturo Mercado Jr., Carmen Mercado and Angeles Mercado.

== Work ==
=== Films ===
Year	Role	Original actor	Film	Spanish title
1964	Bert	Dick Van Dyke	Mary Poppins	Mary Poppins
1965	Judas Iscariot	David McCallum	The Greatest Story Ever Told	La más grande historia jamás contada
1968	Pygar	John Phillip Law	Barbarella	Barbarella
1970	Walter "Radar" O'Reilly	Gary Burghoff	M*A*S*H*	M*A*S*H*
1982	Paul Kersey	Charles Bronson	Death Wish II	El Vengador Anonimo 2
1982	Tex McCormick	Matt Dillon	Tex	Tex
1983	McQuade	Chuck Norris	Lone Wolf McQuade	McQuade, el lobo solitario
1983	Rusty James	Matt Dillon	Rumble Fish	-
1983	Dally Winston	Matt Dillon	The Outsiders	-
1984	Jeffrey Willis	Matt Dillon	The Flamingo Kid	The Flamingo Kid
1984	Jake Scully	Craig Wasson	Body Double	Doble de Cuerpo
1988	Jack Santos	Tommy Swerdlow	Child's Play	Chucky, el muñeco diabolico
1973	Jack Taylor	Kurt Russell	The Strongest Man in the World	El Hombre más Fuerte del Mundo
1990	Bernard "Barney" Thompso	Héctor Elizondo	Pretty Woman	Mujer Bonita
1991	Dr. Leo Marvin	Richard Dreyfuss	What About Bob?	¿Que tal Bob?
1992	Count Dracula	Gary Oldman	Bram Stoker's Dracula	Dracula
1994	Fred Flintstone	John Goodman	The Flintstones	Los Picapiedras
1996	Jack Taylor	George Clooney	One Fine Day	Un dia perfecto
1996	Seth Gecko	George Clooney	From Dusk till Dawn	Del Crepusculo al amanecer
1980 & 1997	Lando Calrissian; Yoda	Billy Dee Williams; Frank Oz	The Empire Strikes Back	El Imperio Contraataca
1983 & 1997	Lando Calrissian; Yoda	Billy Dee Williams; Frank Oz	Return of the Jedi	El Regreso del Jedi
1997	Batman	George Clooney	Batman & Robin	Batman y Robin
1998	Jack	Dennis Quaid	The Parent Trap	Juego de Gemelas
1998	Paulie	Jay Mohr (voice)	Paulie	Paulie
1999	Yoda	Frank Oz	Star Wars: Episode I – The Phantom Menace	Star Wars Episodio I: La Amenaza Fantasma
2000	Billy	George Clooney	The Perfect Storm (film)	La Tormenta Perfecta
2001	Danny Ocean	George Clooney	Ocean's Eleven (2001 film)	La Gran Estafa
2001	Devlin	George Clooney	Spy Kids	Mini-espías
2002	Yoda	Frank Oz	Star Wars: Episode II – Attack of the Clones	Star Wars Episodio II: El Ataque de los Clones
2002	Dirk	Rupert Everett	Unconditional Love	Amor Incondicional
2002	Agent Hanratty	Tom Hanks	Catch Me If You Can	Atrápame si Puedes
2003	Devlin	George Clooney	Spy Kids 3-D: Game Over	Mini-espías 3-D
2004	Danny Ocean	George Clooney	Ocean's Twelve	La Nueva Gran Estafa
2005	Yoda	Frank Oz	Star Wars: Episode III – Revenge of the Sith	Star Wars Episodio III: La Venganza de los Sith
2007	Danny Ocean	George Clooney	Ocean's Thirteen	Ahora Son Trece
2008	Chief	Alan Arkin	Get Smart	Super Agente 86

==== Animated movies ====
Year	Role	Original voice	Film	Spanish title
1966	Winnie the Pooh	Sterling Holloway	Winnie the Pooh and the Honey Tree	Winnie Pooh y el árbol de miel
1973	Wilbur	Henry Gibson	Charlotte's Web (1973 film)	La telaraña de Charlotte
1981	Copper (adult)	Kurt Russell	The Fox and the Hound	El zorro y el sabueso
1986	Fidget	Candy Candido	The Great Mouse Detective	Policias y ratones
1987	Scrooge McDuck	Alan Young	Ducktales: Treasure of the Golden Suns	Patoaventuras: El secreto de los soles dorados
1989	Charlie	Burt Reynolds	All Dogs go to Heaven	Todos los perros van al cielo
1990	Scrooge McDuck	Alan Young	DuckTales the Movie: Treasure of the Lost Lamp	Patoaventuras: La película - El tesoro de la lámpara perdida
1991	Beast	Robby Benson	Beauty and the Beast (1991 film)	La Bella y la Bestia
1994	Adult Simba	Matthew Broderick	The Lion King	El Rey León
1994	Jacquimo	Gino Conforti	Thumbelina (1994 film)	Pulgarcita
1995	Bobby Zimmeruski	Pauly Shore	A Goofy Movie	Goofy, la pelicula
1995	Hamm	John Ratzenberger	Toy Story	Toy Story
1997	Beast	Robby Benson	Beauty and the Beast: The Enchanted Christmas	La Bella y La Bestia: Una Navidad Encantada
1998	Beast	Robby Benson	Belle's Magical World	El Mágico Mundo de Bella
1998	Roger Dearley	Jeff Bennett	Dalmatian Vacation	101 dálmatas de Vacaciones
1998	Simba	Matthew Broderick	The Lion King II: Simba's Pride	El Rey León 2: El Reino de Simba
1998	Mr. Soil	Roddy McDowall	A Bug's Life	Bichos: Una aventura en miniatura
1999	Hamm	John Ratzenberger	Toy Story 2	Toy Story 2
2001	Beast, Simba, McDuck, Winnie the Pooh	-	Mickey's Magical Christmas: Snowed in at the House of Mouse	Una Navidad con Mickey
2003	Gill	Willem Dafoe	Finding Nemo	Buscando a Nemo
2003	Wilbur	David Beron	Charlotte's Web 2: Wilbur's Great Adventure	
2004	Old Man 1	Ollie Johnston	The Incredibles	Los Increibles
2004	Adult Simba	Matthew Broderick	The Lion King 1½	El Rey León 3
2006	Mack	John Ratzenberger	Cars	Cars
2007	Mustafa	John Ratzenberger	Ratatouille	-
2008	Yoda	Tom Kane	Star Wars: The Clone Wars	-
2009	Raymond	Jim Cummings	The Princess and the Frog	La Princesa y el Sapo
2010	Hamm	John Ratzenberger	Toy Story 3	
2011	Lawrence Fletcher	Richard O'Brien	Phineas and Ferb the Movie: Across the 2nd Dimension	Phineas y Ferb la pelicula: A traves de la segunda dimension

=== Television ===
- Walter in Automan
- Walter "Radar" O'Reilly in M*A*S*H*
- Walter O'Reilly from W*A*L*T*E*R
- Mickey Horton in Días de Nuestras Vidas
- Spider-Man in Spiderman (70's TV series)
- Phineas Bogg from Voyagers!

==== Animated characters ====
- Bob from Bob the Builder
- Toad from Gummy Bears
- James the Red Engine from Thomas the Tank Engine and Friends
- Drake Mallard/Darkwing from El Pato Darkwing
- Scrooge McDuck (Rico McPato) in Pato Aventuras
- Shaggy in Scooby-Doo
- Doburoku in Eyeshield 21
- Zabon from Dragon Ball Z
- Simba in Timon y Pumbaa
- Simba, McDuck, Beast and Winnie the Pooh in El Show del Ratón
- Wally Gator/Pixe & Dixie/Mildew Wolf/Shaggy from Laff-A-Lympics
- Wooldoor Sockbat from La Casa de los Dibujos
- Lawrence Fletcher from Phineas and Ferb
- Sergei/"D" from Key the Metal Idol
- Shaggy in Harvey Birdman, Abogado
- Clumsy, Brainy, Jokey, Grandpa Smurf from The Smurfs
- Robin from Super Friends
- Yoda in Star Wars: Clone Wars and Star Wars: The Clone Wars
- Guy-Am-I in Green Eggs and Ham
- Lyle Lipton in Helluva Boss

== See also ==
- List of Mexican voice actors
