= Claudia Motta =

Mexican voice actress (born 1971)

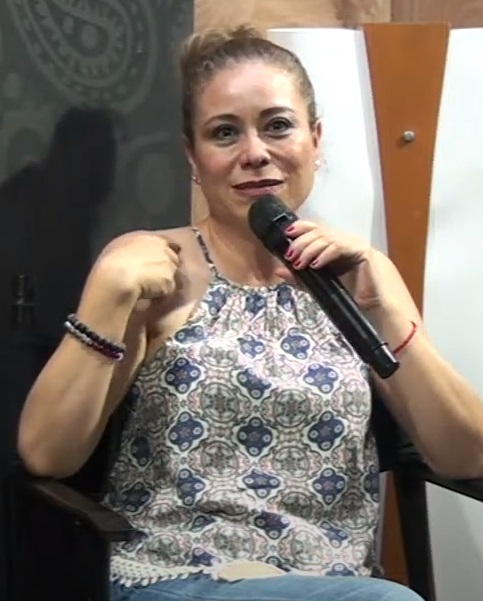
- Motta in 2023.
- Born: Claudia Marisol Motta Zepeda; May 31, 1971 (age 55); Acapulco, Guerrero, Mexico
- Occupation: Voice actress
- Years active: 1993-present

Claudia Marisol Motta Zepeda (born May 31, 1971) is a Mexican voice actress. Notable roles include Doremi Harukaze in Ojamajo Doremi, Shō Marufuji in Yu-Gi-Oh! GX, Merle in The Vision of Escaflowne, and Pandora in the television edition of Saint Seiya: The Hades (Both Chapter Sanctuary & Inferno).

She is also notable for dubbing over the role of Bart Simpson in the Hispanic American dub of the animated sitcom The Simpsons starting with the ninth season, replacing Marina Huerta, who left the show due to salary issues. She voiced this role until the fifteenth season, after which she left due to the conflict between the National Association of Actors and New Art Dub. Marina Huerta returned to take Motta's place.

In one of the episodes of the thirtieth season, she provided Bart's singing voice, and two years later, beginning with the thirty-second season, she returned to voice the character, as well his mother Marge, since the latter character's original voice actress, Nancy MacKenzie, was no longer working for Disney (and died on June 14, 2024).

== Voice roles ==
=== Television animation ===
- Bleach — Orihime Inoue (Yuki Matsuoka)
- El Campamento de Lazlo — Gretchel La Cocodrila (Jill Talley)
- Daria — Brittany Taylor (Janie Mertz)
- Dr. Slump (second series) — Arale Norimaki (Taeko Kawata)
- ¡Oye, Arnold! — Olga Pataki (Nika Futterman), Lila Sawyer (Ashley Buccille)
- Magical DoReMi — Doremi Harukaze (Chiemi Chiba) (Season 2)
- Pokémon — Pikachu (Ikue Ōtani)
- Saint Seiya: The Hades Chapter - Sanctuary (TV edition) — Pandora (Maaya Sakamoto)
- Saint Seiya: The Hades Chapter - Inferno (TV edition) — Pandora (Maaya Sakamoto)
- Los Simpson — Bart Simpson (Nancy Cartwright) (Seasons 9-15, season 32-present)
- Los Simpson — Marge Simpson (Julie Kavner) (Season 32-present)
- South Park — Ike Broflovski (Mexican dub)
- The Vision of Escaflowne — Merle (Ikue Ōtani)
- Yu-Gi-Oh! GX — Shō Marufuji (Masami Suzuki) (Season 1)
- My Little Pony: Friendship Is Magic — Applejack
- La Princesa Sara — Sarah Crawe
- Robotboy — Tommy Turnbull
- The Simpsons — Various voices in the episode "¡The Fall Guy-Yi-Yi!"

=== Theatrical animation ===
- South Park: La Película — Ike Broflovski

=== Live action ===
- American Pie: Campamento de Bandas — Arianna (Lauren C. Mayhew)
- Bring It On — Torrance Shipman (Kirsten Dunst)
- Doctor House — Rebecca Adler (Robin Tunney)
- Lolita — Dolores "Lolita" Haze (Dominique Swain)
- Maria Antonieta — Marie Antoinette (Kirsten Dunst)
- La Sonrisa de Mona Lisa — Betty Warren (Kirsten Dunst)
- Ned Kelly — Julia Cook (Naomi Watts)
- Spider-Man — Mary Jane Watson (Kirsten Dunst)
- Spider-Man 2 - Mary Jane Watson (Kirsten Dunst)
- Es Tan Raven — Miss Romano (Susan Lucci)
- Wimbledon — Lizzie Bradbury (Kirsten Dunst)
