= Gabriel Chávez =

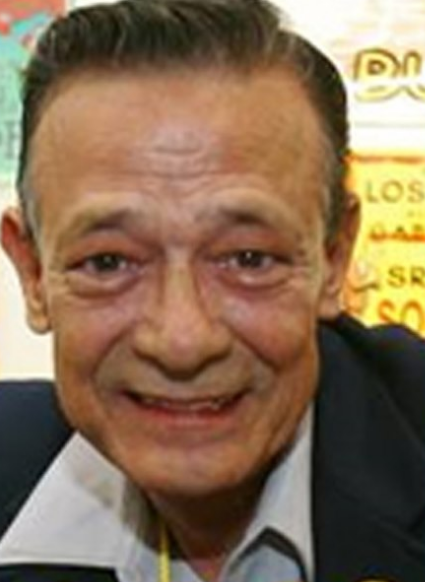
Gabriel Chávez Aguirre

Gabriel Chávez Aguirre (Mexico City, 23 March 1946) is a Mexican voice actor who was the voice of Daisuke Jigen in the Mexican/Latin American dub of Lupin III. He was also the masculine-sounding version of Tsubasa Kurenai in the Cloverway Spanish dub of Ranma ½. Other voice Gabriel Chávez did was the Cancer Man from the X-Files, but nowadays is dubbing the voice of Mr. Burns from The Simpsons.
