= Jorge Arvizu =

Mexican actor (1932–2014)

- Born: Jorge Isaac Arvizu Martínez; July 23, 1932; Celaya, Guanajuato, Mexico
- Died: March 18, 2014 (aged 81); Mexico City, Mexico
- Occupation: Actor
- Years active: 1953–2014

Jorge Isaac Arvizu Martínez (July 23, 1932 – March 18, 2014), better known by the stage name Jorge Arvizu, was a Mexican actor who was the first Spanish voice, among others, for the characters Bugs Bunny, Fred Flintstone and Cookie Monster. He was also nicknamed El Tata.

Arvizu died on March 18, 2014, in Mexico City, after suffering a heart failure.

== Voice Roles ==
- Chef Skinner in Ratatouille (2007)
- Ramon in Cars (2006)
- Bert and Cookie Monster in Plaza Sésamo (1972-1990)
- Chief Garner in Dirty Pair Flash (1998–1999)
- The Narrator in Thomas and Friends (1984-1986)
- Mr. Papadopolous in Life of Brian (1979)
- Grandpa Joe Bucket in Willy Wonka & the Chocolate Factory (1971)
- Mercutio in Romeo and Juliet (1968)
- The Penguin in Batman (1968)
- Dr. Doom in Fantastic Four (1967–1968)
- George Harrison and Ringo Starr in The Beatles TV series (1965–1969) and Let It Be (1970)
- Robot in Lost in Space (1965–1968)
- Maxwell Smart in the Get Smart 1965 TV series, the 1995 revival and the 2008 film
- Quincy Magoo in The Famous Adventures of Mr. Magoo (1964-1965)
- Uncle Fester in The Addams Family (1964)
- Benny the Ball and Choo-Choo in Top Cat (1961–1962) and Top Cat: The Movie (2011)
- Fred Flintstone in The Flintstones (1960–1966)
- Pedro in Lady and the Tramp (1955)
- Bugs Bunny and Daffy Duck in the Looney Tunes and Merrie Melodies (1950–1961)
- Woody Woodpecker (1950–1961)
- Popeye in the Popeye cartoons (1933–1957)
- Felix the Cat
