= Eduardo Garza =

Mexican voice actor (born 1976)

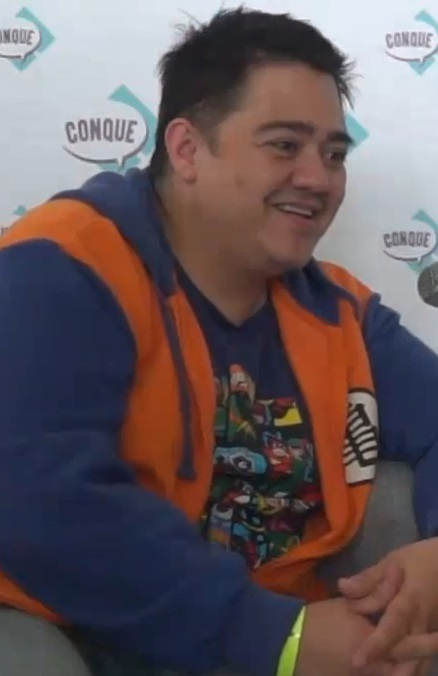
- Born: José Eduardo Garza Escudero; January 10, 1976 (age 50); Mexico City, Mexico
- Other name: Lalo Garza
- Occupations: Voice actor; voice director
- Years active: 1990-present

José Eduardo Garza Escudero (born January 10, 1976), also known as Lalo Garza, is a Mexican voice actor and voice director. He is best known for being the voice of Krillin in Dragon Ball and Josh on the Spanish dub of Drake & Josh. He also voices Elmo, making him one of the Mexican voice actors with the highest vocal ranges (he is a tenorino).

== Career ==
Born in Mexico City, he gained a B.A. in Advertising and Acting. He works in theater, television, advertising, dubbing, puppets and music.

In 1991, he began working with Audiomaster 3000, dubbing characters in TV shows, such as Brad Tylor in Home Improvement, Skeeter in Doug, Max in Mighty Max, Thorfinn in Vinland Saga, Itsy Bitsy in Itsy Bitsy Spider and Brendan in Step by Step.

In 1998 he started working for voice directions. His most important works are the movies Flawless, The Exorcist, Drake & Josh, Laguna Beach, Veronica Mars, Naruto, Zatch Bell!, Studio 60, Mortal Kombat X and Growing Up Creepie.

Of the characters voiced by Garza for Mexican TV, the more notable ones are Elmo and Big Bird in Sesame Street (Plaza Sesamo), Krillin in Dragon Ball Z, Josh in Drake & Josh, Fes in That '70s show, David in Six Feet Under, Brad in Home Improvement, Skeeter in Doug, Donatello in Teenage Mutant Ninja Turtles (2003), Francis in Malcolm in the Middle (until season 5), Prince Adam in He-Man, Bill in Sitting Ducks, Enzo in ReBoot, Henry in Thomas & Friends, Pinocchio in Shrek 2, Shrek the third and Shrek Forever After, Weevil in Yu-Gi-Oh!, Jamie in Daria, Tom in Wheel Squad, Tommy in 3rd Rock from the Sun, Louis Stevens in Even Stevens, Jeremiah Trottman in Zoey 101, Gaara, Gamatatsu, Shukaku and Akamaru in Naruto, Parco Folgore in Zatch Bell!, Francis in Malcolm in the Middle, Ichigo Kurosaki in Bleach, Ebony Maw in Avengers: Infinity War and Avengers: Endgame, Carl and Carl² in Carl², Sputz Ringley in Rocket Power, Budge in Growing Up Creepie, Scrambler in Bob the Builder, Kung Lao, Reptile and Rain in Mortal Kombat X, Myron in Wayside, Xandir in Drawn Together (Spanish language title is La Casa de los Dibujos), Logan in Veronica Mars, Tom in Studio 60 and the Martians of Toy Story, Toy Story 2 and Buzz Lightyear Adventures. He also voiced Fancy-Fancy (in Spanish known as Panza) in the 2011 animated feature film, Don Gato y su Pandilla.

He's also the voice director and announcer of the dubbing for iCarly.
