= Gerardo Reyero =

Mexican voice actor (born 1965)

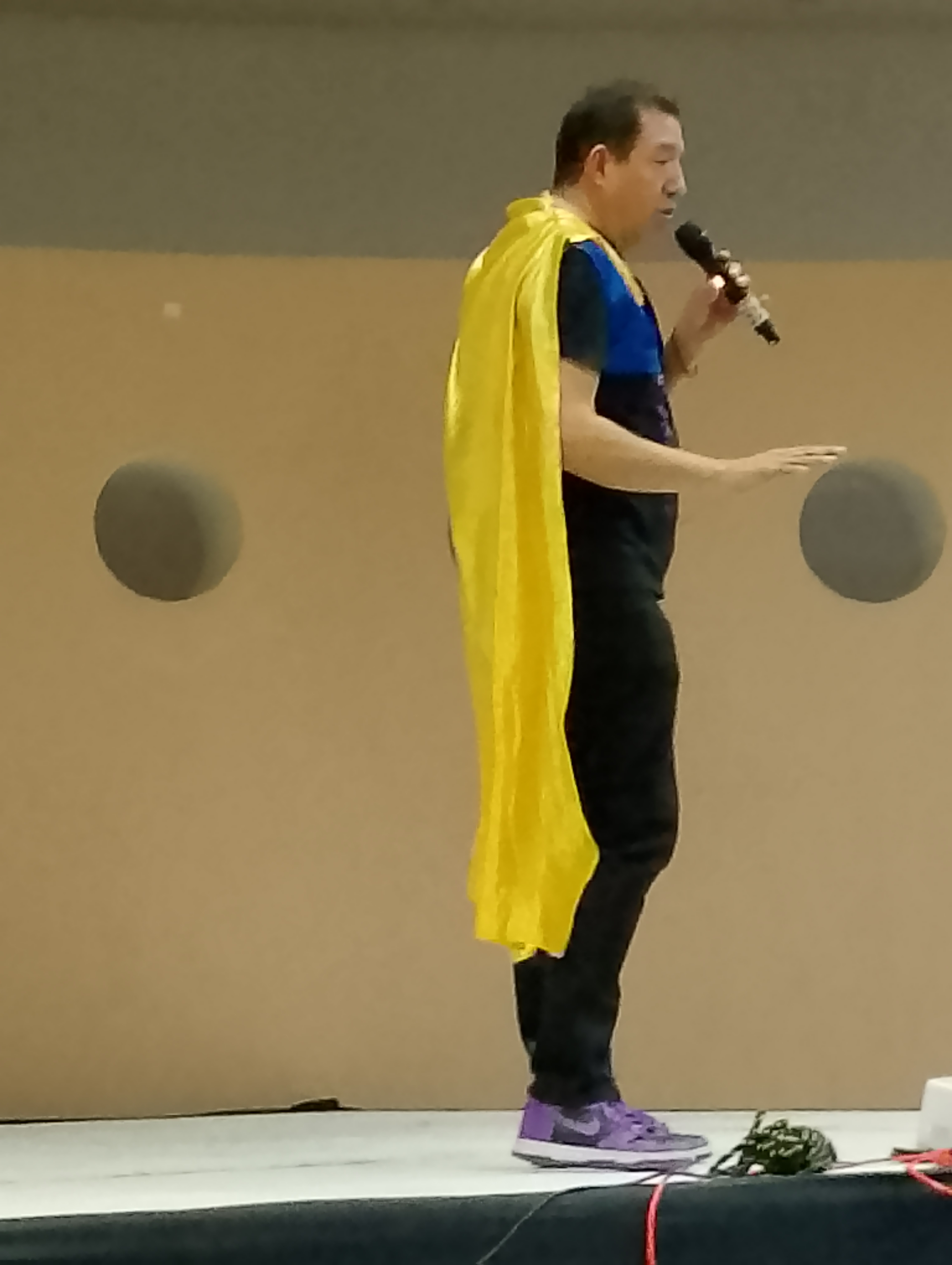
- Born: Gerardo Reyero Muñoz; October 2, 1965 (age 60); Puebla, Mexico
- Occupations: voice actor, voice director

Gerardo Reyero Muñoz (born October 2, 1965, in Puebla), better known as Gerardo Reyero, is a Mexican voice actor. His specialty is serious older men and villains, though he occasionally plays lighter roles too.

== Filmography ==
- "Beyblade: Metal Masters" - Dr Zigurat (Final Boss) (2013)
- Narrator FBI (Multiplayer) in Call of Duty: Black Ops II (VG) (2012)
- Additional voices in Halo 4 (VG) (2012)
- Stump Smash and Tree Rex in Skylanders: Giants (VG) (2012)
- Stump Smash in Skylanders: Spyro's Adventure (VG) (2011)
- Logan in Fable III' (VG) (2010)
- Sergeant Johnson in Halo: Reach (VG) (2010)
- Angels and Archangels voices in Darksiders (VG) (2010)
- The Presenter of Night Springs, Maurice Horton, Possessed and additional voices in Alan Wake (VG) (2010)
- Chief of T.U.F.F. in T.U.F.F. Puppy (2010–2015)
- Sergeant Johnson in Halo 3 ODST (2009)
- Dog "Choke" L. McGraw and additional voices in Fable II (2008) (VG)
- Bryan Mills in Taken (2008) (Liam Neeson)
- Sergeant Johnson in Halo 3 (VG) (2007)
- Armand in La Leyenda del Zorro (2005)
- Senator Bail Organa in Star Wars-Episodio III: La Venganza de los Sith (2005)
- V in V for Vendetta (2005)
- Capitanazo (Captain Hero) in La Casa de los Dibujos (2004–2007)
- Aspirant André Matias in Elite Squad (2007) (voiceover for André Ramiro)
- Rella's father in Cinderella Boy (2004–2005)
- Newscaster in Yu-Gi-Oh! La Película (2004)
- Dr. Ivan Krank in Teacher's Pet (2004 film) (2004)
- Vincent Volaju in Cowboy Bebop: La Película (2003)
- Might Guy in Naruto (2002)
- Daniel in Love Actually (2003) (Liam Neeson)
- Geordi La Forge in Viaje a las Estrellas: Némesis (2002) (voiceover for LeVar Burton)
- Minoru Fujii in Hajime no Ippo (2002)
- MetaKnight in Kirby: Right Back at Ya! (2002)
- Gustav in El Castillo de Cagliostro (2002)
- Senator Bail Organa in Star Wars-Episodio II: El Ataque de los Clones (2002)
- Ardeth Bay in La Momia Regresa
- Khalim in Yu-Gi-Oh! Duel Monsters (2001–2005)
- Belthazor in Charmed (2000–2006)
- Red Foreman in That 70s Show (2000–2006)
- Coach Don Hauser in The Sopranos (2000–2006)
- David Scatino in The Sopranos (2000–2006)
- Captain Hero in Drawn Together (2004-2007)
- Freezer in Dragon Ball GT (2000)
- Devimon in Digimon Adventure (1999–2000)
- Snowball in Animal Farm (1999)
- Ardeth Bay in The Mummy (1999) and The Mummy Returns
- Geordi La Forge in Viaje a las Estrellas: Insurrección (1998) (voiceover for LeVar Burton)
- Aaron in The Prince of Egypt (1998)
- Brock Lovett in Titanic (1997 film) (1997)
- Lieutenant Jackson Briggs aka Jax in Mortal Kombat Annihilation (1997)
- Raiden in Mortal Kombat X and Mortal Kombat 11 (voiceover for Richard Epcar)
- Titan Raiden in Mortal Kombat 1 (voiceover for Travis Willingham)
- Geordi La Forge in Viaje a las Estrellas: Primer Contacto (1996) (voiceover for LeVar Burton)
- Benvolio in William Shakespeare's Romeo y Julieta (1996)
- Freezer in Dragon Ball Z (1997-1999)
- Mez in Dragon Ball Z (1997)
- Tao Pai Pai in Dragon Ball (1996)
- Nam in Dragon Ball (1996)
- Darien Chiba/Tuxedo Mask in Sailor Moon (1996–1999) and its movie spinoffs (1997–1999)
- Michael Collins in Michael Collins (1996) (Liam Neeson)
- President Whitmore in Dia de la Independencia (1996)
- Daitetsu Kunikida in Blue Seed (1996)
- Geordi La Forge in Viaje a las Estrellas: La Nueva Generación (1994) (voiceover for LeVar Burton)
- Mikado Sanzenin in Ranma ½: Big Trouble in Nekonron, China (1994)
- Gardok Odama in Zillion: Burning Night (1994)
- Mikado Sanzenin in Ranma ½ (1993–1997)
- Yuta in Mermaid's Scar (1993)
- Dr. Frasier Crane in Frasier (1993–2004) (voiceover for Kelsey Grammer)
- T-1000 in Terminator 2: El Juicio Final (1991) (voiceover for Robert Patrick)
- Jedediah Tucker Ward in Class Action (1990) (voiceover for Gene Hackman)
- Jerry Seinfeld in Seinfeld (1990–1998) (voiceover for Jerry Seinfeld)
- Cyclops/Scott Summers in Spider-Man (1994 animated series) and X-Men: The Animated Series (1989–1992) (Voiceover for Norm Spencer)
- Sgt. Johnny Gallagher in The Package (film) (1989) (voiceover for Gene Hackman)
- Geordi La Forge in Viaje a las Estrellas: La Nueva Generación (1987–1994) (voiceover for LeVar Burton)
- Scilla Io and Canes Venatici Asterion in Los Caballeros del Zodíaco (1987)
- Detective Bill Vukovich in Terminator (1984) (voiceover for Lance Henriksen)
- Han Solo in Star Wars Episode VI: Return of the Jedi (1983) (voiceover for Harrison Ford) (1997 redub)
- LeVar Burton in Reading Rainbow (1983–2006)
- Dr. Frasier Crane in Cheers (1982–1993) (voiceover for Kelsey Grammer)
- Han Solo in Star Wars Episode V: The Empire Strikes Back (1980) (voiceover for Harrison Ford) (1997 redub)
- Reverend Frank Cross in La Aventura del Poseidón (1979) (voiceover for Gene Hackman)
- Benjamin Franklin "Hawkeye" Pierce in M*A*S*H (film) (1978) (voiceover for Donald Sutherland)
- Han Solo in Star Wars Episode IV: A New Hope (1977) (voiceover for Harrison Ford) (1997 redub)
- Jimmy "Popeye" Doyle in La Conexión Francesa (1977) (his debut role) (voiceover for Gene Hackman)
- Jimmy Cooper in The O.C. (2003)
- Ben Harmon in American Horror Story (2011)
- Black Mask in Batman Arkham Origins
- Luther Pendragon in The Adventures of Merlin
