= Xóchitl Ugarte =

Mexican voice actress (born 1979)

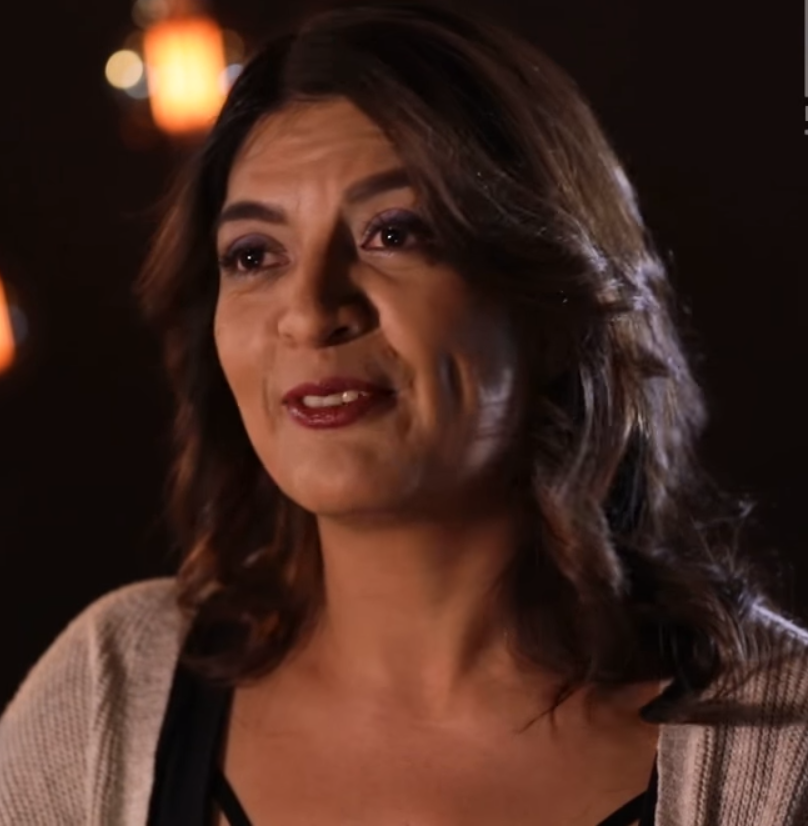
- Born: Xóchitl Ugarte Fonseca; April 21, 1979 (age 46); Mexico City, Mexico
- Occupations: Voice actress, voice director
- Years active: 1984–present
- Spouse: Gerardo Garcia (m. 2004; div. 2009)
- Children: Constanza García

Xóchitl Ugarte Fonseca (born April 21, 1979) is a Mexican voice actress. She is best known as the Latin American Spanish voice of Misty in Pokémon, Eris in a later dub of The Grim Adventures of Billy and Mandy, Emily in Thomas and Friends, Vanessa Leeds in a later dub of Robotech: The Macross Saga, Dana Sterling in a later dub of Robotech Masters and Aelita in the Latin American Spanish dub of Code Lyoko. She was also the Spanish-dubbed voice of Elizabeth Swann in the Pirates of the Caribbean film series and the Christy Carlson Romano's character Ren Stevens in Even Stevens. She is the niece of fellow voice actor Eduardo Fonseca and the sister of fellow voice actors Víctor Ugarte and Gaby Ugarte and was married to Gerardo García.

As seen, her most usual roles involve tomboyish and strong-willed young women.

== Voice acting career ==
- Alice Abernathy/Janus Prospero in Resident Evil: Ultratumba (2010), Resident Evil: La Venganza (2012) and Resident Evil: Capítulo Final, (2017) (voiceover for Milla Jovovich)
- Elizabeth Swann in Piratas del Caribe: En el Fin del Mundo (2007), Piratas del Caribe: El Cofre de la Muerte (2006) and Piratas del Caribe: La Maldicion del Perla Negra (2003) (voiceover for Keira Knightley)
- Gwen Stacy in El Hombre Araña 3 (2007) (voiceover for Bryce Dallas Howard)
- Dorinda in The Cheetah Girls 2 (2006) (voiceover of Sabrina Bryan)
- Cathy in Trapped in the Closet (2005-)
- Domino Harvey in Domino (2005) (voiceover for Keira Knightley)
- Ellen in Isla de Matadores (2005)
- London Tipton in Zack y Cody: Gemelos en Acción (2005–2007) (voiceover for Brenda Song) (first season only)
- Brandy Harrington in Brandy y el Señor Bigotes (2004–2006)
- Deunan Knute in Appleseed (2005)
- Kuina in One Piece (2004–2007)
- Ginebra in Rey Arturo (2004)
- Ivy Walker in La Aldea (2004) (voiceover for Bryce Dallas Howard)
- Vanessa Leeds in Robotech:La Saga Macross (2004)
- Dana Sterling in Robotech Masters (2004)
- Aelita in Code Lyoko (2003–2004)
- Emily in Thomas the Tank Engine and Friends (2003-)
- Sam in Espías Sin Límite (2003-)
- Rosa, la Rumorosa and La bruja baratuja in El Chapulín Colorado Animado
- Misty in Pokémon Heroes (2003)
- Dorinda in The Cheetah Girls (2003) (voiceover of Sabrina Bryan)
- Misty in Pokémon 4 (2002)
- Dama Clarissa de Cagliostro in El Castillo de Cagliostro (2002)
- Yuka in Inuyasha (2002–2007)
- Misty in Pokémon 3:La Película (2001)
- Misty in Pokémon 2000: La Película (2000)
- Yukari Uchida in the first episode of La Visión de Escaflowne (2000)
- Ren Stevens in Even Stevens (2000–2003) (voiceover of Christy Carlson Romano)
- Misty in Pokémon: La Película - Mewtwo Contraataca (1999)
- Misty in Pokémon (1998–2003; 2004)
- Sabrina Spellman in Sabrina: The Teenage Witch (1997–2003) (second voice, voiceover for Melissa Joan Hart)
- Soon Lee in M*A*S*H: Adios, Hasta Luego, y Amen (1995)
- Cammy White in Street Fighter: La Última Batalla (1994) (voiceover for Kylie Minogue)
- Sami Brady in Dias de Nuestras Vidas (1993-) (voiceover for Alison Sweeney)
- Sayoko Mishima in Oh My Goddess! (1993)
- Keiko O'Brien in Viaje a las Estrellas: Estación Espacial 9 (1993)
- Sayoko in Fight! Iczer-One (1992)
- Lynn in El Puño de la Estrella del Norte (1991)
- Keiko O'Brien in Viaje a las Estrellas: La Nueva Generación (1991–1992)
- Lynn in Fist of the North Star (1988–1990)
- Tammy in Pound Puppies and the Legend of Big Paw (1988)
- Spock (child) in Viaje a las Estrellas 3: La Búsqueda de Spock (1984)
- Harold Stinkleton in Kitty Is Not a Cat (2018)
- 22 in Soul (2020)
- 22 in 22 contra la Tierra (2021)
- Stephanie Tanner in Tres por tres (1988-1995) (second voice, voiceover for Jodie Sweetin)

=== Video games ===
- League of Legends - Vayne
- Spider-Man (2018 video game) - Silver Sable
- Mortal Kombat X - Jacqui Briggs / Sareena
- Mortal Kombat 11 - Jacqui Briggs
