= Rossy Aguirre =

Mexican actress (born 1968)

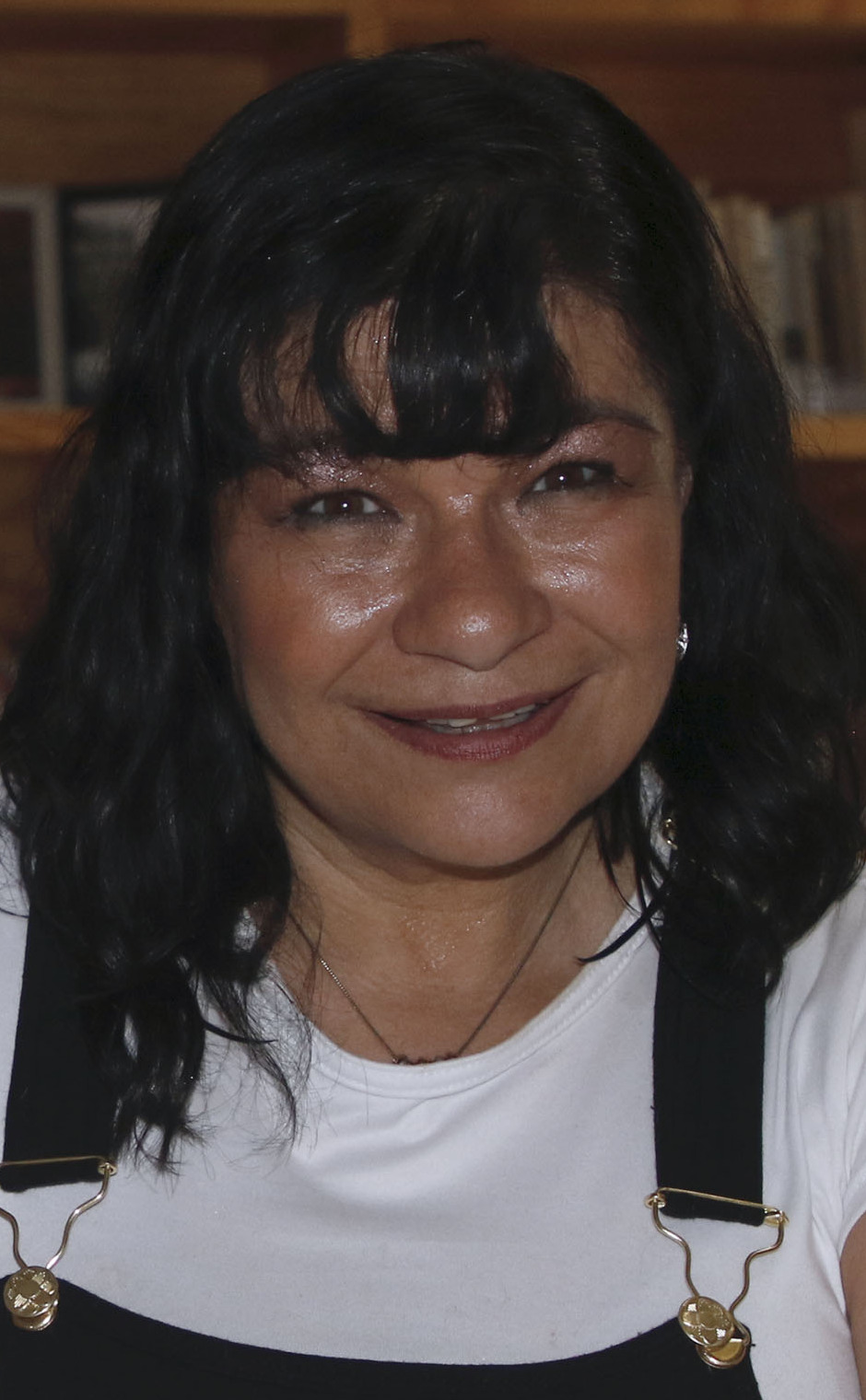
- Aguirre in 2024
- Born: Rosanelda Geraldina López Aguirre; 2 April 1968 (age 58); Mexico City, Mexico
- Occupations: Actress; dubbing director
- Years active: 1973–present
- Mother: Rosanelda Aguirre

Rosanelda Geraldina López Aguirre (born 2 April 1968) is a Mexican actress. Aguirre began voice work (dubbing) at the age of 5, following the career of her mother, Rosanelda, who was also an actress. Her specialities as voice actress are young women (ranging from tomboys to gentle ladies, but leaning more towards the first archetype) and young boys under the age of 16.

== Filmography ==
=== Animation ===
- Amy Mizuno aka Sailor Mercury in Sailor Moon
- Akane Tendo in the Ranma ½ TV series
- Buttercup in The Powerpuff Girls (1998)
- Child and teenaged Krillin in Dragon Ball and Dragon Ball Z (up until the first half of the Freezer saga)
- Kiyoko in Akira (Spanish-language version)
- Samuel "Sammy" Oak in Pokémon 4
- Murasaki Suminawa in The Plot of the Fuma Clan
- Gosalyn Waddlemeyer-Mallard in Darkwing Duck
- Princess Aphros in Cyborg 009 (Spanish-language version)
- Meena of the X-Laws in Shaman King
- D.W. in Arthur (TV series)
- Phil in Rugrats and Rugrats Crecidos
- Patty in Peanuts
- Phoebe in Hey Arnold!
- Ayumi in Inuyasha (Spanish-language version)
- Cherry (Cereza) in the Saber Marionette (Chica Marionetta) series (Spanish-language version)
- Euridice in Saint Seiya: Hades Inferno (DVD Dub)
- Nagisa Kano in Fight! Iczer-One
- Pom in Babar: The Movie and Babar (TV series) (Mexican re-dubs)
- Clara in The Nutcracker Prince
- Sleeping Beauty in Shrek the Third (Latin American Spanish-language version)
- Lola Mbola in Robotboy
- Additional voices in Adventures of Sonic the Hedgehog
- Additional voices in Sonic Underground
- Mavis and Rusty in Thomas and Friends
- Nicole Watterson (Gumball's Mom) in The Amazing World of Gumball (Latin American Spanish-language version)
- Patti Mayonnaise in Doug (Disney episodes)
- Slouchy Smurfling (11 year old) The Smurfs (5th season- 8th season)
- Arrietty in The Secret World of Arrietty (DVD Dub)
- Hange Zoë in Attack on Titan

=== Live-action ===
- Perla (voiceover for Elisa Erali) in La Letra Escarlata (her debut)
- Toby Hart (voiceover for Adam Rich) in El Diablo y Max Devlin
- Whit Stovall (voiceover for Kyle Eastwood) in Honkytonk Man
- Lt. Saavik (voiceover for Kirstie Alley) in Viaje a las Estrellas: La Ira de Khan
- Lt. Saavik (voiceover for Robin Curtis) in Viaje a las Estrellas III: La Búsqueda de Spock
- Susan (voiceover for Madonna) in Desperately Seeking Susan
- David Freeman (voiceover for Joey Cramer) in El Vuelo del Navegador
- Gordie Lachance (voiceover for Wil Wheaton) in Cuenta Conmigo
- Lt. Saavik (voiceover for Robin Curtis) in Viaje a las Estrellas IV: El Viaje a Casa
- Wesley Crusher (voiceover for Wil Wheaton) in Viaje a Las Estrellas: La Nueva Generación
- John Connor (voiceover for Eddie Furlong) in Terminator 2: El Juicio Final
- Mae Mordabito (voiceover for Madonna) in A League of Their Own
- Valerie Solanas (voiceover for Lili Taylor) in Yo le Disparé a Andy Warhol
- Julieta (voiceover for Claire Danes) in William Shakespeare's Romeo y Julieta
- Joey Potter (voiceover for Katie Holmes) in Dawson's Creek
- Alan A. Allen (voiceover for Rupert Grint) in Thunderpants
- Wesley Crusher (voiceover for Wil Wheaton) in Viaje a las Estrellas: Nemesis.
