= Esteban Siller =

Mexican voice actor (1931–2013)

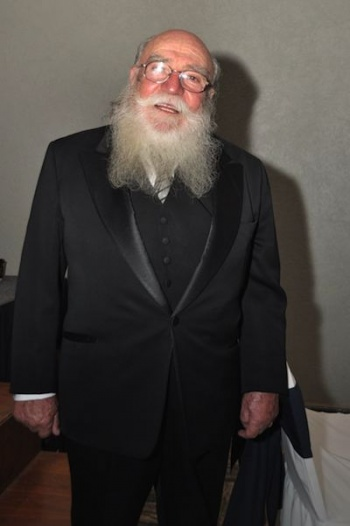
Esteban Siller Garza

Esteban Siller Garza (17 April 1931 – 23 October 2013) was a Mexican voice actor from Monterrey, Nuevo León.

== Filmography ==
- King in Cinderella (1950) (redub)
- Bull in Lady and the Tramp (1955) (redub)
- Peter Potamus in Yogi's Gang (1973-1974)
- Otto in Robin Hood (1973)
- Doogie Daddy in Laff-a-Lympics (1977-1979)
- Almirante Boom in Mary Poppins (1980)
- Gargamel in The Smurfs (1981-199?)
- Admiral Ackbar in Star Wars Episode VI: Return of the Jedi (1983) (1997 redub)
- Dolben and Doli in The Black Cauldron (1985)
- Dawson in The Great Mouse Detective (1986)
- Maurice in La Bella y la Bestia (1992)
- Newman in Seinfeld (1992–1998)
- Terada Torahiko in Doomed Megalopolis (1993)
- Lind in Sol Bianca (1993)
- C in Key the Metal Idol (1994)
- Carface in All Dogs Go to Heaven 2 (1996)
- Vladimir in Anastasia (1997)
- Geri in Toy Story 2 (1999)
- Rudy the Old Man in The Emperor's New Groove (2000)
- Jacob in Joseph: King of Dreams (2000)
- Cookie in Atlantis: The Lost Empire (2001)
- Cookie in Atlantis: Milo's Return
- Doc in Snow White (2001) (redub)
- Doc in House of Mouse
- Doc in The Lion King 1½
- Doc in Mickey's Magical Christmas: Snowed in at the House of Mouse
- Papa Elf (Bob Newhart) in Elf
- Belvedere in Mr. Belvedere
- Tex Dinoco in Cars (2006)
- Gus (Mickey Rooney) in Night at the Museum (2006)
- Master Oggway in Kung Fu Panda (2008)
- Quincy Magoo in Kung Fu Magoo
- Sir Cumference in Pac-Man and the Ghostly Adventures (2013) (1st voice, episodes 3-23)
- Mr. Bentley in Bob the Builder (2001-2012)
