= Diana Santos =

Mexican actress

Diana Santos in the 60s or 70s

Alicia Diana Santos Colmenero (born June 9, 1950), better known as Diana Santos, is a Mexican voice actress who has dubbed Minnie Mouse's voice in Latin Spanish, the part of Takeshi in the Spanish dubbed version of the 1967–1968 Japanese television program Comet-San. She has also been credited as Ad Santos (with "Ad" being "A.D.", which stands for her initials "Alicia Diana"). She is the daughter of Edmundo Santos and Alicia Colmenero.

== Filmography ==
- Bo Peep in Toy Story 5 (2026)
- Helga in Sting (2024)
- Nostalgia in Inside Out 2 (2024)
- Bo Peep in Lamp Life (short film) (2020)
- Nai-Nai in Abominable (2019)
- Joan Thompson in Ordinary Love (2019)
- Bo Peep in Toy Story 4 (2019)
- Belle in Wreck-It Ralph Breaks the Internet (2018)
- Mother in Rapunzel's Tangled Adventure (episode 27) (2017-2020)
- Julia Child (TV Chef) in The Boss Baby (2017)
- Miss Chicarelli in Kick Buttowski (2010-2013)
- Isabella Garcia-Shapiro (singing voice) in Phineas and Ferb (2007) (Season 1 only)
- Mini in Cars (2006)
- Audrey in Home on the Range (2004)
- Minnie Mouse in Mickey's Twice Upon a Christmas (2004)
- Minnie Mouse in Mickey, Donald, Goofy: The Three Musketeers (2004)
- Belle and Minnie Mouse in House of Mouse (2001-2003)
- Belle / Minnie Mouse in Mickey's Magical Christmas: Snowed in at the House of Mouse (2001)
- Minnie Mouse in Mickey's Once Upon a Christmas (1999)
- Minnie Mouse (1960s-present)
- Lucille Vinson in Crazy in Alabama (1999)
- Bo Peep in Toy Story 2 (1999)
- Belle (speaking voice) in Belle's Tales of Friendship (1999)
- Lila Alweather (speaking voice) in Paulie (1998)
- Boy in hospital in Babe: Pig in the City (1998)
- Belle (speaking voice) in Belle's Magical World (1998)
- Belle (speaking voice) in Beauty and the Beast: The Enchanted Christmas (1997)
- Felinet in The Adventures of Pinocchio (1996) (Original Mexican dub)
- Nerdluck Nawt in Space Jam (1996)
- Baloo (cub) and Mowgli in Jungle Cubs (1996-1998)
- Bo Peep in Toy Story (1995)
- The Hoggetts' Daughter / The Singing Mice / Valda in Babe (1995)
- Spanky McFarland in The Little Rascals (1994) (Original Mexican dub)
- Sarah Sanderson in Hocus Pocus (1993) (Mexican re-dub)
- Jerry and Robyn Starling (singing voice) in Tom and Jerry: The Movie (1992)
- Young Ebenezer Scrooge as well as Clara and Beaker in The Muppet Christmas Carol (1992)
- Belle (speaking voice) in Beauty and the Beast (1991)
- Binkie, Honker, and Tank Muddlefoot in Darkwing Duck (1991)
- Edmond in Rock-A-Doodle (1991)
- Miss Bianca in The Rescuers Down Under (1990)
- Rebecca Cunningham in TaleSpin (1990)
- Webby in DuckTales the Movie: Treasure of the Lost Lamp (1990)
- Miss Piggy in Muppet Babies (1984–1991) and Muppets from Space (1999)
- Chip (second voice) in Chip 'n Dale Rescue Rangers (1989)
- Anne-Marie in All Dogs Go to Heaven (1989) (Original Mexican dub)
- Piglet (in some episodes) in The New Adventures of Winnie the Pooh (1988-1991)
- Young Babar / Young Celeste in Babar: The Movie (1989) (Mexican re-dub) (1994)
- Hansel (singing voice) in Hansel and Gretel (1987)
- Princess Rosebud in Sleeping Beauty (1987)
- Young Snow White in Snow White (1987)
- Margaret Krusemark in Angel Heart (1987)
- Twinkle in Pinocchio and the Emperor of the Night (1987)
- Jeanette Miller in The Chipmunk Adventure (1987) (Original Mexican dub)
- Olivia Flaversham / Lady Mouse in The Great Mouse Detective (1986)
- Alicia in He-Man & She-Ra: A Christmas Special (1985)
- Sunni Gummi / Princess Calla in Disney's Adventures of the Gummi Bears (1985)
- Princess Eilonwy / Fairfolk Little Girl in The Black Cauldron (1985)
- Mrs. Brisby / Timothy Brisby in The Secret of NIMH (1982) (Original Mexican dub)
- Hayley Mills (Hostess) in Disney Animation: The Illusion of Life (1981) (Television Special)
- Vixey in The Fox and the Hound (1981)
- Smurfette in The Smurfs (1981-1989)
- Banjo in Banjo the Woodpile Cat (1979) (Original Mexican dub)
- Madame du Barry in Lady Oscar (1979)
- Boy (speaking voice) in The Small One (1978)
- Pete (speaking voice) in Pete's Dragon (1977)
- Elisa in The Wild Swans (1977)
- Miss Bianca in The Rescuers (1977)
- Fritz in Hans Christian Andersen's The Little Mermaid (1975)
- Peter / Clara Sesemann in Heidi (1974)
- Oliver Twist in Oliver Twist (1974)
- Maid Marian (speaking voice) in Robin Hood (1973)
- Fern Arable and Jeffrey the Gosling in Charlotte's Web) (1973)
- Paul Rawlins in Bedknobs and Broomsticks (1971)
- Artful Dodger in Oliver! (1968) (Original Mexican dub)
- Mowgli in The Jungle Book (1967)
- Christopher Robin in the Winnie the Pooh featurettes (1966–1974)
- Liesl von Trapp (speaking voice) in The Sound of Music (1965) (Original Mexican dub)
- Michael Banks / Jane Banks (singing voice) in Mary Poppins (1964) (Mexican re-dub) (1986)
- Miles in The Innocents (1961)
- Lucky and Penny in One Hundred and One Dalmatians (1961)
- Susan Evers and Sharon McKendrick in The Parent Trap (1961) (Original Mexican dub)
- Pollyanna Whittier in Pollyanna (1960)
- Huckleberry Finn in The Adventures of Huckleberry Finn (1960)
- Anne Frank in The Diary of Anne Frank (1959)
- Arliss Coates and Lisbeth Searcy in Old Yeller (1957)
- Lucrecia in The Flame and the Arrow (1950)
- Singing Harp (speaking voice) in Fun and Fancy Free (1947) (Mexican re-dub) (1992)
- Adult Faline (speaking voice) in Bambi (1942) (Mexican re-dub) (1969)
- Vicky Standing in Susannah of the Mounties (1939)
- Snow White in Snow White and the Seven Dwarfs (1937) (Mexican re-dub) (2001) (3 loops)

== Honours and awards ==
On November 28, 2020, during the 2nd Lavat Awards ceremony held in Mexico City, Diana Santos received an honorary award in recognition for her lifetime work as a dubbing actress spanning 64 years. The ceremony was broadcast live on the Lavat Awards official website due to the COVID-19 pandemic, as opposed to the previous year.
