= Francisco Colmenero =

Mexican voice actor

- Born: José Francisco Colmenero y de la Villanueva y Villanueva; February 28, 1932 (age 94); Mexico City, Mexico
- Occupations: voice actor, voice director
- Years active: 1954-present
- Spouse: María Teresa Colmenero (m. 1955)

José Francisco Colmenero y Villanueva (born February 28, 1932, in Mexico City, Mexico), known professionally as Francisco Colmenero, is a Mexican voice actor and voice director. After the death of his father, his brother in law, voice actor and voice director Edmundo Santos, offered him a job as his private driver and Colmenero accepted. During his time working as the driver of Edmundo Santos, Colmenero met the muse of Santos, the voice actress Estrellita Díaz with whom he started an affair and after a while Díaz convinced Santos to use Colmenero as a dubbing actor for additional voices (although Colmenero wasn't an actor nor having any knowledge of acting) debuting in The Adventures of Rin Tin Tin in 1954.

In 1959 Santos as a gesture of kindness referred Colmenero to Enrique Candiani, CEO of the back then new dubbing company Servicio Internacional de Sonido for hire him as voice director.

After the death of Edmundo Santos in 1977, Colmenero and his siblings took over the dubbing company of Santos called Grabaciones y Doblajes, S.A. and never informed their main customer, The Walt Disney Company, about the passing of Santos and Colmenero became the almost absolute voice director in the company after putting his brother Jorge as the production manager. This era of Disney's Latin Spanish dubs was known for excessive repetition of a few actors in all the dubs directed by Colmenero for Disney arranging the castings to make the client believe that Colmenero's group had been selected.

In 1988 Disney's localization executives learned the truth about the castings and the death of Santos then The Walt Disney Company filed a lawsuit to Grabaciones y Doblajes, S.A. meanwhile for the pending dubs were hired the studios Intersound in Los Ángeles and Servicio Internacional de Sonido in Mexico City. A few time later voice actor Javier Pontón was hired as dubbing creative manager for then recent created Disney Character Voices International assuring Disney's Latin Spanish dubs in Los Ángeles and other studios of Mexico City different of Grabaciones y Doblajes keeping a hard supervision over castings and performance.

== Filmography ==
=== Voice Dubbing Director ===
- Mary Poppins (1980 re-dubbing)

=== Movie and TV dubbing ===
- John Locke in LOST (2006-)
- Bilbo Baggins from The Lord of the Rings trilogy (2001-2003) (originally played by Ian Holm)
- Uncle Albert from Mary Poppins (originally voiced by Ed Wynn)
- Old Deuteronomy in Cats (1998 film)
- Pescadara staff member in Terminator 2: El Juicio Final (1991)
- Barney from The Flintstones in Viva Rock Vegas (Originally voiced by Stephen Baldwin)
- Truck driver in Terminator (1984)
- Earl Sinclair in Dinosaurios (1991-1994)
- Super Friends narrator
- Wonder Woman adventures narrator
- Phineas and Ferb dubbing director, narrator
- Arthur Hoggett in Babe (1995) and Babe: Pig in the City (1998)
- Narrator in The Iron Giant (1999)
- Dr. Teeth/Swedish Chef/Lew Zealand/Statler/Ice Cream Man (Bob Hope)/Lew Lord (Orson Welles) in The Muppet Movie (1979) (1993 redoblaje)
- Dr. Teeth/Statler/Swedish Chef/Sweetums/Pops/Lew Zealand/English Man (Robert Morley) in The Great Muppet Caper
- Jacob Marley (Statler) in The Muppet Christmas Carol
- Statler/Chief Pig/Sweetums in Muppet Treasure Island
- Bobo the Bear (Rentro) in Muppets from Space
- Statler/Swedish Chef/Bobo the Bear in The Muppets (film)
- Statler/Swedish Chef/Bobo the Bear in Muppets Most Wanted
- Lofty in Bob the Builder (2001-2011)

=== Animated movie characters ===
- Bichonesto in Gato con botas: El ultimo deseo (2022)
- Glynn in Thomas & Friends: The Adventure Begins (2015)
- Goofy from Mickey Mouse until Goof Troop
- Sheriff in Cars (2006)
- Amos Slade in El Zorro y el Sabueso 2 (2006)
- Sheriff Brown in Vacas Vaqueras (2004)
- Horacio in 101 dálmatas II: Una nueva aventura en Londres (2003)
- Narrator in La Bella Durmiente redub (2001)
- Alcalde Phlegmming in Ósmosis Jones (2001)
- Gruñon in Blancanieves redub (2001)
- Gruñon and Pumbaa in El Show del Ratón
- Gruñon and Pumbaa in El Rey León 3
- Gruñon and Pumbaa in Una Navidad con Mickey
- Pumbaa in Timon y Pumbaa
- Pumbaa in El Rey León 2: El Reino de Simba
- Narrator in Blancanieves redub (2001)
- Santa Claus in Rudolph, el reno de la nariz roja (1998)
- Cornelius in Bichos (1998)
- Father in Ferngully II: El Rescate Mágico (1998)
- Puffin in La princesa encantada (1994)
- Pumbaa in El Rey León (1994)
- Narrator in Ferngully: Las aventuras de Zak y Crysta (1992)
- Hexxus in Ferngully: Las aventuras de Zak y Crysta (1992)
- Crysta's Father in Ferngully: Las aventuras de Zak y Crysta (1992)
- Narrator in La Bella y la Bestia (1991)
- Bartholomew, Thug Guard #1, Bar Guy, and Citizen in Policías y Ratones (1986)
- One of the Soldiers in El caldero mágico
- Clyde the Crow in Katy La Oruga
- Cronos in El Secreto de NIHM (1982)
- Amos Slade in El Zorro y el Sabueso (1981)
- Yattaran in Capitán Raymar (1981)
- Inspector Eduardo Scott in Lupin III: La Película (1980)
- Hoagie in Pete's Dragon (Pedro y el Dragón Elliot – 1977)
- Mr. Snoops in Bernardo y Bianca (1977)
- King Richard Lionheart in Robin Hood (1973)
- The Sheriff of Nottingham in Robin Hood (1973)
- Sir Crocodile in Robin Hood (1973)
- Templeton in Charlotte's Web (1973)
- Mr. Toplofty in An American Tail: The Treasure of Manhattan Island (2000)
- Lafayette in The Aristocats (Los Aristogatos – 1970)
- Daffy Duck in the Looney Tunes and Merrie Melodies (1970)
- Fat Crow in Dumbo (1969)
- Dizzy in El Libro de la Selva (1967)
- Feliz in Blancanieves y los Siete Enanos (1964)
- Horacio in 101 Dalmatas (1961)
- Pedro in the Disney shorts (1956-)
- Bull and Tofi in Lady and the Tramp (1955)
- Fly in Hotel Transylvania (2012) and Hotel Transylvania 2 (2015)
- Jemmy the Cat in Hans Christian Andersen's The Little Mermaid (1975)
