= Patricia Acevedo =

Mexican actress and director

- Acevedo at the 2026 Panama Comic-Con
- Born: María del Socorro Patricia Acevedo Limón; April 29, 1959 (age 67); Mexico City, Mexico
- Occupations: Voice actress, director
- Years active: 1970s–present

María del Socorro Patricia Acevedo Limón (born April 29, 1959, in Mexico City), better known as Patricia Acevedo, is a Mexican actress and director. She was the voice of Sailor Moon in the Latin American Spanish dub, and is arguably among the most popular Usagi actresses. Her voice is easy to identify due to its gentle soprano tone, which remains even if she voices a colder or evil character (i.e. Cobalt in Fight! Iczer-One).

== Voice acting career ==
=== Animation ===
All of her voice roles are in every Spanish-language dub of both Western and Japanese media:

- Sailor Moon / Serena Tsukino / Usagi Tsukino in Sailor Moon and Sailor Moon Crystal.
- Lisa Simpson, in the Latin American dub of The Simpsons 1990–2005, 2021–present.
- Jane Turner in the Samed
- Additional voices in The Cowboy Bebop Movie
- Akane Tendo in the Ranma ½ films (Nihao My Concubine and Big Trouble in Nekonron, China)
- Asuka Tenjouin/Alexis Rhodes in Yu-Gi-Oh! GX (episodes 15–52)
- Ayame (InuYasha)
- Misa Hayase/Lisa Hayes, Sammie Porter, Nova Satori, Annie Labelle from the Robotech Generations series
- Angelica Pickles, Rugrats and All Grown Up!, as well as The Rugrats Movie and Rugrats in Paris: The Movie.
- Aiko Date in Hajime no Ippo
- Chi-Chi (although the character's name was changed to "Milk") and Chaozu in Dragon Ball Z
- Iron Maiden Jeanne in Shaman King
- Cobalt in Fight! Iczer-One
- Etsumi Kido in Mirumo
- Casper, in the Latin American dub (her first role)
- Oakley in Pokémon Heroes
- Rosa and Princess Deena in the 2001 version of Cyborg 009
- Tiger Lily in The Adventures of Peter Pan
- Reina Emeralda in Capitán Raymar and Arcadia of My Youth
- Princess Adora/She-Ra in She-Ra: Princess of Power
- Gabby in My Little Pony
- Charlene Sinclair in Dinosaurs
- Vicky in Jimmy Timmy Power Hour
- Swamee Princess in The Little Mermaid (1975)
- Nodoka Miyazaki in Negima! Magister Negi Magi (Spanish dub)
- Reina Merla - Queen Merla in Voltron (Spanish dub)
- Patti Mayonnaise in Doug (Nickelodeon series only)
- Kuki Sanban and Maggie (the future Madame Margaret) in Codename: Kids Next Door
- Granmami Aves/Lady Gobbler in El Tigre: The Adventures of Manny Rivera
- Various voices in the episode "¡The Fall Guy-Yi-Yi!" of The Simpsons

=== Live action ===
- Violet Beauregarde (voiceover for Denise Nickerson) in Willy Wonka and the Chocolate Factory (1971) (1984 re-dub)
- Nora (voiceover for Helen Reddy) in Pete's Dragon (1977) (her full-length feature film debut)
- Major Margaret "Hot Lips" Houlihan (voiceover for Sally Kellerman) in M*A*S*H (1970)
- Lady Oscar (voiceover for Catriona MacColl) in Lady Oscar (1979)
- Dra. Kate McCrae (voiceover for Yvette Mimieux) in The Black Hole (1979)
- Lt. Commandante (Dra.) Christine Chapel (voiceover for Majel Barrett) in Star Trek: The Motion Picture (1979)
- Dale Arden (voiceover for Melody Anderson) in Flash Gordon (1980)
- Stella Summers (voiceover for Julie Budd) in The Devil and Max Devlin (1981)
- Marion Ravenwood (voiceover for Karen Allen) in Raiders of the Lost Ark (1981)
- Natalia (voiceover for Barbara Carrera) in Condorman (1981)
- Lora/Yori (voiceover for Cindy Morgan) in Tron (1982)
- Chalmers (voiceover for Andrea Marcovicci) in Spacehunter: Adventures in the Forbidden Zone (1983)
- J.C. Walenski (voiceover for Ally Sheedy) in Bad Boys (1983)
- Jennifer Katherine Mack (voiceover for Ally Sheedy) in WarGames (1983)
- Cherry Valance (voiceover for Diane Lane) in The Outsiders (1983)
- Kara Zor-El/Linda Lee/Supergirl (voiceover for Helen Slater) in Supergirl (1984)
- Sarah Connor (voiceover for Linda Hamilton) in The Terminator (1984) and Terminator 2: Judgment Day (1991)
- Wann Li/Shorty (voiceover for Ke Huy Quan) in Indiana Jones and the Temple of Doom (1984)
- Julia (voiceover for Suzanna Hamilton) in 1984 (1984)
- Allison Reynolds (voiceover for Ally Sheedy) in The Breakfast Club (1985)
- Ellen Ripley (voiceover for Sigourney Weaver) in Aliens (1986) (director's cut version)
- Dra. Christine Chapel (voiceover for Majel Barrett) in Star Trek IV: The Voyage Home (1986)
- Epiphany Proudfoot (voiceover for Lisa Bonet) in Angel Heart (1987)
- Katya Yarno (voiceover for Diane Lane) in Lady Beware (1987)
- Jessie Montgomery (voiceover for Ally Sheedy) in Maid to Order (1987)
- Cécile de Volanges (voiceover for Uma Thurman) in Dangerous Liaisons (1988)
- Teri (voiceover for Victoria Jackson) in UHF (1989)
- Buckwheat and Miss Roberts (voiceover for Ross Bagley and Lea Thompson) in The Little Rascals (1994)
- Casper (voice dubbing for Malachi Pearson and voiceover for Devon Sawa) in the live-action adaptation of Casper (1995)
- Gloria Capulet (voiceover for Diane Venona) in Romeo + Juliet (1996)
- Grace Connelly (voiceover for Jennifer Aniston) in Bruce Almighty (2003) (Universal Pictures DVD version)
- Alex (voiceover for Rose Byrne) in Wicker Park (2004)
- Jack Starbright (voiceover for Alicia Silverstone) in Alex Rider: Operation Stormbreaker (2004)
- Veronica Bell (voiceover for Brooke D'Orsay) in The Skulls III (2004)
- Joanne (voiceover for Mena Suvari) in Beauty Shop (2005)
- Bryony (voiceover for Michelle Duncan) in Driving Lessons (2006)
- Janey (voiceover for Ginnifer Goodwin) in In the Land of Women (2007)
- Chispita (voiceover for Paulie Kitt) in Speed Racer (2008)
- Marion Ravenwood (voiceover for Karen Allen) in Indiana Jones and the Kingdom of the Crystal Skull (2008).
- Sarah Connor (voiceover for Linda Hamilton) in Terminator Salvation (2009)
- Alice Cullen (voiceover for Ashley Greene) in The Twilight Saga: New Moon (2009) (re-dubbed version)
- Beth Murphy (voiceover for Jennifer Aniston) in He's Just Not That Into You (2009) (Videomax version)
- LN (voiceover for Maggie Gyllenhaal) in Away We Go (2009)
- Nicole (voiceover for Emily Mortimer) in The Pink Panther 2 (2009)

==== Live-action TV ====
- Rachel Green (voiceover for Jennifer Aniston) in Friends (1994–2004)
- Tabitha in Bewitched (1966–1972)
- Laura Ingalls (voiceover for Melissa Gilbert) in Little House on the Prairie (1974–1980)
- Dra. Marlena Evans (voiceover for Deidre Hall) in Days of Our Lives (1976–1987; 1991-)
- Hester Prynne (voiceover for Meg Foster) in The Scarlet Letter (1979)
- Julie Preston (voiceover for Susan Dey) in Sunset Limousine (1983)
- Major Margaret "Hot Lips" Houlihan (voiceover for Loretta Swit) in M*A*S*H (1984–1995)
- Computer voice in Star Trek: The Next Generation (1987–1994)
- Kate Monday (voiceover for Beverly Leech) in Mathnet (1987–1989)
- Computer voice in Star Trek: Deep Space Nine (1993–1999)
- Computer voice in Star Trek: Voyager (1995–2001)
- Tootie (voiceover for Kim Fields) in The Facts of Life
- Brian Tanner in ALF (1986–1990)
- Kimberly McIntyre (voiceover for Jessica Lucas) in 90210 (2008) (four episodes)

== Director credits ==
- Lady Oscar (1979)
- Sailor Moon (1996–1999)
