= Ned Chaillet =

American radio director, writer (b. 1944)

Edward William Chaillet, III (/ˈʃaɪeɪ/ SHY-ay; born 29 November 1944) is a radio drama producer and director, writer and journalist.

Chaillet, American by birth, was born in Boston, Massachusetts, but is a "native of Washington" according to The New York Times. He has lived in Britain since 1973.

His newspaper career began at the Washington Evening Star in 1964, interrupted by service in the United States Army. He then lived in Europe, founded the Free State Theater company in Maryland, and studied at the University of Maryland, College Park and California Institute of the Arts.

Chaillet moved to London in 1973 to work at The Times Literary Supplement for the editors Arthur Crook and John Gross 1974–76. He was deputy drama critic (to Irving Wardle) for The Times 1975–83. In 1983, he joined the BBC as Editor, Radio 3 Plays, before becoming a producer for BBC Radio Drama. At the same time (1983–86), he wrote drama criticism for The Wall Street Journal – Europe.

His radio programmes have received five Sony Radio Academy Awards, and the Prix Italia for Fiction in 1997. In 2005, he was nominated by the Directors Guild of Great Britain for Outstanding Achievement in Radio. Between 2008 and 2012, Chaillet taught Radio and Microphone Technique at the Central School of Speech and Drama (London). In 2013, working with Chris Wallis at Autolycus Productions, he completed the recording of David Suchet's single-voice reading of the entire Bible (New International Version, 2011) for CTVC.

== Radio plays ==
Radio plays directed or produced by Ned Chaillet
Date first broadcast	Play	Author	Cast	Synopsis Awards	Station Series
9 August 1984 – 12 August 1984	Salesman in Beijing	Arthur Miller abridged in four parts by Michael Bakewell	Read by Arthur Miller	Arthur Miller reads from his account of his journey to Beijing to direct a production of his play Death of a Salesman in Chinese.	BBC Radio 3
5 February 1985 (Recorded on 29 September 1984)	Marion	Alan Drury	Maggie McCarthy, Jill Gascoine and Brian Kelly	Anne (Jill Gascoine) and Brian return from their mother's funeral to encounter an unexpected visitor: an unknown woman who makes some startling claims and revelations.	BBC Radio 4 Thirty-Minute Theatre
17 May 1986 (Recorded on 17 April 1986)	Where Are You Wally?	Barry Wasserman from a story by Barry Wasserman and Patrick Carroll	Alfred Molina, Bill Paterson, Shaun Prendergast, Jennifer Piercey, Pauline Letts, Edward de Souza, Deborah Makepeace, Janis Winters, Ronald Herdman, Louis Mahoney, Paul B. Davies, Andrew Branch, Garard Green, Natasha Pyne, Stephen Rashbrook and Avril Clarke	When Albert picks up a passenger in his mini-cab he is left with a bag full of money as the passenger rushes to catch a train. £275,000 proves too great a temptation, and he goes on the run. The Detective Sergeant who pursues him finds that Albert clings to his radio and finally establishes contact via the airwaves, but the police are not the only people interested in finding Albert.	BBC Radio 4
18 November 1986	Optimistic Tragedy	Vsevolod Vishnevsky translated and adapted by Richard Crane and Faynia Williams	Toyah Willcox, Shaun Prendergast, Trader Faulkner, Linda Marlowe, Stephen Boxer, Richard Durden, John Church, Paul Barber, Trevor Allan Davies, Garard Green, James Goode, Brian Hewlett, George Parsons, Pauline Letts, Elaine Claxton and David Learner	Vishnesvsky's Soviet classic from 1932/3 celebrates the indomitable spirit of the new Soviet navy in the turbulent years following the Revolution. A young female commissar is appointed to represent the revolution on a ship's company, but Anarchists undermine the Communists at every turn and make them vulnerable to the Germans.	BBC Radio 3
23 November 1986	On Mayday	Paul Copley	Natasha Pyne, Jan Winters, Bryan Pringle, Christopher Fairbank, Garard Green, Daniel Kodicek, Wayne Howard, Peter Howell, Deborah Makepeace and Kim Wall	Tom tries to reach his wife in the USSR as the radioactive cloud from Chernobyl spreads across Europe.	BBC Radio 4 Sunday Play
27 August 1987 (Recorded on 12 July 1987)	Sweet Tooth	Mel Calman	Steve Hodson, Richard Griffiths, Melinda Walker, Denis Lawson, Tim Reynolds, Morag Hood, Steven Harrold, Julie Berry and John Holmstrom	A would-be adulterous affair consisting of meetings in a tea shop may be frustrating to George and Alice, but it is a matter of life or death to the Rum Baba and his friends on the cake shelf.	BBC Radio 3
11 December 1987	Languages Spoken Here	Richard Nelson	Colin Stinton, Emily Richard, Renny Krupinski, Jiri Hanak, Peter Craze, Steven Harrold, John Samson and Karen Archer	Michael believes he is doing a favour for the Polish émigré writer, Janusz, by translating his book. But whose cause is he serving? A morally ambiguous comedy. Won a Giles Cooper Award in 1987	BBC Radio 3
1 March 1988	Tickertape and V-Signs	Peter Cox	Brian Bovell and Stephen Tompkinson	A black soldier returning from the Falklands War finds himself the subject of racial taunts.	BBC Radio 3
21 June 1988 (Recorded on 15 June 1988)	Hancock's Last Half Hour	Heathcote Williams	Richard Briers with Steve Hodson and Zelah Clarke	Tony Hancock died on 25 June 1968. His last half-hour is a solitary affair and his audience has dwindled to a telephone, some clippings and a bottle of vodka.	BBC Radio 3
22 March 1989 (Recorded on 28 January 1989)	Haunted by More Cake	Steve Walker	Graham Crowden, Joan Mattheson, Stephen Tompkinson, Victoria Carling, John Bull, Richard Pearce, Philip Sully, John Warner, Joan Walker, Nicholas Courtney, Jo Kendall and Charlotte Green	Ginger's nephew Lionel has a problem; there's a tea party going on in his stomach and he's fallen in love with one of the guests. What can Ginger do to help?	BBC Radio 4
29 September 1989 (Recorded on 9 June 1989)	The Bass Saxophone	Josef Škvorecký, adapted by Nigel Baldwin; Music by Graham Collier	John Woodvine, Jonathan Cullen, Joe Dunlop, Elizabeth Mansfield, Danny Schiller, Michael Kilgarriff, Michael Graham Cox, Ken Cumberlidge, David King, Jo Kendall and John Bull	"You were Eve and it was the apple" is Old Joseph's admonition to his younger self, remembering when a German band appeared in his German-occupied town in Czechoslovakia. The apple was the band's bass saxophone and the temptation was to play it for a German audience. Sony Award – Best Drama Production 1990	BBC Radio 3
30 October 1989	Eating Words	Richard Nelson	John Woodvine, Sheila Allen, Ed Asner, Emily Richard, Charles Simpson, Vincent Brimble, John Bull, David King, Elizabeth Mansfield, Simon Treves, Joe Dunlop, Christopher Good and Danny Schiller	Won a Giles Cooper Award in 1989.	BBC Radio 4
4 November 1989 (Recorded on 10 August 1989)	Rabbit Man	Mel Calman	Jim Broadbent, Maggie McCarthy, Carolyn Backhouse, John Moffatt, Ken Campbell, Susan Sheridan, Melinda Walker and David Goudge	A man sprouts rabbit ears.	BBC Radio 3
1 April 1990 (Recorded on 18 March 1990)	Joe Allen		Presented by Daily Mail theatre critic Jack Tinker	A profile of the restaurateur Joe Allen	BBC Radio 4
8 September 1990 (Recorded on 17 May 1990)	True Believers (Note: Produced by Ned Chaillet, directed by David Greenwood)	Mike Walker	Dhirendra Kumar, Meera Syal and Elizabeth Mansfield	'Tony' has turned his back on his Sikh family and married an English girl. But his brother's activities threaten to destroy his happiness.	BBC Radio 4 Saturday Night Theatre
9 October 1990	Betrayal	Harold Pinter	Harold Pinter, Patricia Hodge, Michael Gambon, Christopher Good and Elizabeth Mansfield	A study of triangular infidelity and friendship.	BBC Radio 3
27 December 1990 (Recorded on 26 October 1990)	Advice to Eastern Europe	Richard Nelson	Andrew Wincott, John Bull, Simon Treves, Joanna Myers, Jenny Howe, Tara Dominick, Oliver Cotton, Colin Stinton and Edita Brychta	The barriers between East and West have fallen to open up economic and artistic ambition for Eastern Europe. Helena come to England with a project, only to meet a love-smitten American script editor...	BBC Radio 3
3 February 1991	Diary of a Madman	Gogol, adapted by James Burke, re-mixed for radio by John Whitehall; Music: Peter Shade	Kenneth Williams and Richard Williams	Kenneth Williams, directed by the animator Richard Williams, performs triumphantly in the 1963 soundtrack of an uncompleted film of Nikolai Gogol's demented masterpiece.	BBC Radio 4
28 April 1991	When We Dead Awaken	Henrik Ibsen translated and adapted by Robert Ferguson; Music by Ilona Sekacz	Paul Scofield, Cheryl Campbell, Imogen Stubbs, Jon Strickland, Terence Edmond, Joanna Myers, Alan Barker, Joanna Myers and Danielle Allan	In Henrik Ibsen's last play, a celebrated sculptor returns to Norway with his young wife and confronts Irene, the tormented model of his masterpiece.	BBC Radio 3
3 July 1991 (Recorded on 13 April 1991)	The Ashes	Sue Townsend	Ronald Herdman, Stephen Tompkinson, Fraser Kerr, David Sinclair, Joanna Myers, Karen Archer, Robin Weaver, Brian Johnston and Peter Barker	The captain of the England team is going to be a father, but Louise is not his wife...	BBC Radio 3
5 October 1991 (Recorded on 25 August 1991)	Japan Season – The Romance of the Road		Alan Booth	Alan Booth, famous for a 2,000-mile walk through Japan, talks about a new walk he took with a reluctant companion.	BBC Radio 3
13 October 1991 (Recorded on 2 September 1991)	Japan Season – Yabuhara, the Blind Master Minstrel	Inoue Hisashi translated and adapted by Marguerite Wells; Songs by Koichi Uno; Additional music by Mia Soteriou	John Woodvine, Roger Allam, Mia Soteriou, David Bannerman, Ronald Herdman, Sirol Jenkins, Charles Millham, Joanna Myers, Margaret Shade, Susan Sheridan, Auriol Smith and Andrew Wincott	Hisashi Inoue's bawdy comedy charts the rise of a blind minstrel to the top ranks of Japanese society through murder, theft and extortion	BBC Radio 3
14 October 1991 (Recorded on 2 October 1991)	Japan Season – Kyōgenii, The Monkey-Skin Quiver (Note: BBC data credits "Producer: E. Chaillet"; however Ned says "I didn't direct the Kyōgen. In fact, I curated the whole drama side of the Japan Season, but only Yabuhara, Performing Rites, Alan Booth, were mine.")	Utsubozaru translated by Don Kenny	Andrew Wincott, Joanna Myers, Alan Barker and Matthew Sim	Second of three short comedies taken from the traditional Japanese theatre.	BBC Radio 3
18 October 1991 (Recorded on 27 September 1991)	Japan Season – Performing Rites aka Modern Japanese Theatre		Dr Brian Powell	Dr Brian Powell of Keble College Oxford examines the development of the modern Japanese theatre, talking to its leading dramatists, directors, critics and performers.	BBC Radio 3
2 November 1991	The Little Walls	Winston Graham, dramatised by Juliet Ace	Alex Jennings, Roger Lloyd Pack, Kate Bufferey, Vivian Pickles, Norman Jones, Helen Cooper, Terence Edmond, Timothy Morand, Eric Allen, Ronald Herdman, Siriol Jenkins, Cassie MacFarlane, Neil Roberts, David Sinclair, Matthew Sim and Auriol Smith	Winston Graham's novel was the first winner of the Crime Writers' Association Crossed Red Herring award for best crime novel of the year. Philip has returned to Europe from America after his brother appears to commit suicide in Amsterdam. His search for the truth takes him from England to the Netherlands and Italy.	BBC Radio 4 Saturday Play; Gold and Silver Daggers Season
22 December 1991 (Recorded on 7 October 1991)	Design for Living	Noël Coward	Cheryl Campbell, Alex Jennings, Michael Kitchen, Joanna Myers, James Laurenson, Alan Barker, Bradley Lavelle and Linda Marlowe	Three terminally stylish friends who share rivalrous affections attempt to uncoil their twisted love triangle in this sexy and scandalous gem.	BBC Radio 3
23 March 1992	The Wench is Dead	Colin Dexter dramatised by Guy Meredith	John Shrapnel, Robert Glenister, Garard Green, Joanna Myers, Peter Penry-Jones and Kate Binchy	After he's rushed into hospital, Inspector Morse becomes intrigued by an old crime.	BBC Radio 4
27 May 1992	Introducing Fagan	Maurice Leitch	T. P. McKenna and Anita Dobson	A dark, claustrophobic play.	BBC Radio 4
8 June 1992	Who Killed Palomino Molero?	Mario Vargas Llosa translated and adapted by Bronwyn Ferzackerley	Charles Simpson, Ray Fearon, Steve Hodson, Melanie Hudson, Jonathon Taffler, Linda Marlowe, Madelaine Kemms, Jo Kendall, John Bull, Gordon Reid, Nicholas Murchie, Jonathon Addams, John Church and Mia Soteriou	1954. Peru. Northern desert. Military base. A recruit is found murdered. The resulting investigation is flawed by indifference and the commanding officer's stonewall.	BBC Radio 4 Monday Play
23 June 1992	Dictator Gal	David Zane Mairowitz; Music: Trevor Allan Davies; Sound Design: John Whitehall	Josette Simon and Joe Melia	A musical satire Special Jury Commendation: Prix Futura Berlin 1993	BBC Radio 3
7 November 1992	The Facts Speak for Themselves	Mark Leech	Larry Dann, Meg Davies, Struan Rodger, Steve Hodson, Kate Binchey, Mathew Morgan, Keith Drinkel, Eric Allan, Phillip Anthony, Nicholas Murchie, Melanie Hudson, John Webb and Jonathon Taffler	What at first seems to be an open-and-shut case turns out not to be so straightforward.	BBC Radio 4 Saturday Playhouse
30 November 1992 – 9 December 1992	McSorley's Wonderful Saloon	Joseph Mitchell abridged by Patrick Carroll	Read by Eli Wallach	Eli Wallach reads eight stories from Joseph Mitchell's classic collection of tales from the New Yorker, beginning with the first part of a celebrated portrait of New York's oldest saloon, McSorley's.	BBC Radio 4 Book at Bedtime
17 July 1993	The Right Result	Peter R. Simpkin	Malcolm Rennie, Brian Croucher, Adé Sapara, Paul Shane, Michael Melia, Mona Hammond, Ray Lonnen, Oscar James, Malcolm Kaye, Don Gilét, Michael Onslow, Vivienne Rochester, Andrew Wincott, Gary Lawrence, Steve Hodson, James Telfer, John Evitt, John Fleming and John Webb	When a black youth dies in a violent incident on the London Underground, the subsequent investigation uncovers a pervasive racism that appears to reach to the top ranks of the police themselves.	BBC Radio 4 Saturday Night Theatre
18 October 1993 (Recorded on 28 August 1993)	The Lake	Ellen Dryden	James Aubrey, Karen Archer, Pauline Yates, Frances Jeater, Barry Woolgar, Teresa Gallagher, David Thorpe, Nicholas Boulton, Steve Hodson, Isabelle Hewitt, John Prendergast and Hayley Thomas	Childhood memories draw Ben Wheeler back to a lake, but when a child disappears his obsession provokes suspicion.	BBC Radio 4
11 March 1994	Waiting for Lefty	Clifford Odets adapted by Bill Morrison	Ed Bishop, William Hootkins, Bob Sherman, Bradley Lavelle, Teresa Gallagher, Malcolm Ward, Paul Panting, Melanie Hudson, Jonathon Tafler and Michael Fitzpatrick	Series of related vignettes, framed by the meeting of cab drivers who are planning a strike	BBC Radio 3
24 March 1994	Tipperary Smith	Paul Copley	Natasha Pyne and Barbara Durkin	The adventures of a Bradford woman in the Far East. Commended by European Broadcasting Union (Turin – Sept. 1994)	BBC Radio 4
9 April 1994 – 15 April 1994	Shakespeare's sonnets		Simon Callow	Six programmes, broadcast daily, in which Simon Callow explores the hidden meaning of the Sonnets by following a radical reordering by John Padel. Believing that the W.H. is William Herbert, it suggests that the poems were initially commissioned to convince W.H. to marry. The later passions and anguish of the poems then reveal the Poet.	BBC Radio 3
28 May 1994	Last Seen Wearing	Colin Dexter dramatised by Guy Meredith	John Shrapnel, Robert Glenister, Miles Anderson, Melinda Walker, Donald Sumpter, Frances Jeater, Terence Edmond, Tamsin Greig, John Hartley and Emily Woof	Colin Dexter's grumpy detective Inspector Morse is reluctant to take over an old missing person case from a dead colleague, but murder is Morse's speciality and the case soon has complications.	BBC Radio 4
12 June 1994	Inugami, The Dog God	Shūji Terayama translated by Carol Fisher Sorgenfrei; Music by Mia Soteriou	Pauline Letts, Susan Sheridan, Julian Rhind-Tutt, Auriol Smith, Ann Windsor, Charles Milham, David Banerman, James Taylor, Joanna Myers, Siriol Jenkins, Margaret John and Rachel Atkins	In a remote village in Japan, a woman is attacked by a dog. Nine months later she gives birth to a son, Tsukio, and the village treats him with apprehension. A powerful mythic drama by one of the 20th century's most important Japanese writers, Shūji Terayama.	BBC Radio 3
2 August 1994	Virtual Radio	Andrew Dallmeyer	Stephen Tompkinson, Jennie Stoller, Buffy Davis, Larry Dann and Anthony Jackson	Virtual reality is so seductive to Bob that his entire life becomes devoted to escape into his machinery – but where will it take him when the bailiffs come?	BBC Radio 4 Thirty Minute Theatre
28 January 1995 (Recorded on 5 January 1995)	Friday's Child	Georgette Heyer dramatised by John Peacock	Mary Wimbush, Eva Stuart, Susan Sheridan, David Bannerman, Tessa Worsley, Nicholas Boulton, Simon Russell Beale, Julian Rhind-Tutt, Ian Hughes, Jilly Bond, Paul Panting, Cathy Sara, Peter Kenny, David Antrobus, Annabel Mullion, James Frain and Elli Garnett	Viscount Sheringham is fast spending his money, and cannot inherit until he marries. Will his choice of bride bring happiness to them both?	BBC Radio 4 Playhouse
23 April 1995	Green and Pleasant Land	Jeremy Nicholas	Written and presented by Jeremy Nicholas	Sony Gold Award for Best Feature Programme 1996	BBC Radio 2 Radio Two Arts Programme
24 April 1995	Silver's City	Maurice Leitch	Brian Cox, Freddie Boardley, James Nesbitt, Clare Cathcart, John Rogan, Sean Caffrey, Michael McKnight, Ethna Roddy, Valerie Lilley, Catherine White, Conleth Hill, Toby E. Byrne, Robert Patterson, Joshua Towb, and James Greene	Brian Cox stars as 'Silver' Steele in Maurice Leitch's play based on his Whitbread Prize-winning novel. Freed from imprisonment for terrorism by a Loyalist raid on his hospital room, Silver finds that his ideals have made him a dangerous anachronism in a changing Northern Ireland.	BBC Radio 4 The Monday Play
13 May 1995	Telephone in the Deep Freeze	Janet Plater	Barbara Durkin, Polly James, Oliver Cotton, Eric Allan, Sandra Voe, Hazel Holder, Colin Pinney, Donald Sumpter, George Parsons, Lyndam Gregory and Gary Lawrence	"Only people like us, who have lived with an alcoholic, can understand the mental agony that goes with it. We're co-alcoholics." Janet Plater's deeply moving play follows the fortunes of members of a support group for "co-alcoholics".	BBC Radio 4
28 May 1995	The Sound of Silents	Neil Brand	Contributors: Carl Davis, David Robinson, Kevin Brownlow Lisa Hull	In cinema's centenary year, Neil Brand - composer and accompanist to silent films at the National Film Theatre - explores the great years before the coming of sound. Also including a 'silent film for radio' written and read by Miles Kington to the piano accompaniment of Neil Brand.	BBC Radio 2 Radio Two Arts Programme
3 September 1995 (Recorded on 24 August 1995)	Biography Races		Presented by John Walsh, Literary Editor of The Independent. Biographers Victoria Glendinning, Humphrey Carpenter and Miranda Seymour join publisher Helen Fraser.		BBC Radio 4 Books and Company
10 September 1995 (Recorded on 7 September 1995)	Begin at the Beginning		Presented by John Walsh, Literary Editor of The Independent.	Children's storytelling has become a global industry where books sell upwards of 30 million copies.	BBC Radio 4 Books and Company
17 September 1995 (Recorded on 14 September 1995)	The Literature of Rock 'n' Roll		Presented by John Walsh, Literary Editor of The Independent. With Nik Cohn, Lucy O'Brien and Jon Savage.	Are books about rock the new rock'n'roll?	BBC Radio 4 Books and Company
25 September 1995 (Recorded on 22 September 1995)	The Burglar	Colin Dexter	Read by John Turner	Neighbourly concern about a suspicious stranger sets a new puzzle for Inspector Morse and Sergeant Lewis in a story specially written for the Nottingham Boucheron.	BBC Radio 4 Short Story
30 December 1995	Death of an Ugly Sister	John Peacock	Roy Barraclough, Paul Shane, Linda Regan, John Alstead, Tina Grey, Jilly Mears, Gordon Reid, Annabel Mullion, Christopher Sidon, Oliver Senton, David Lerner, Crawford Logan, Peter Yapp, Michael Tudor Barnes. Becky Hindley, Sandra Bowe and James Beatty	A very dark comedy of pantomime, serial murder, crack addiction and secret gay sex.......	BBC Radio 4 Saturday Night Theatre
31 December 1995; Extended repeat 11 May 1997	The Proust Screenplay	Harold Pinter adapted for radio by Michael Bakewell	Douglas Hodge, John Wood, Emma Fielding and Harold Pinter	Harold Pinter's film script of Marcel Proust's novel À la recherche du temps perdu has never been produced for the screen, but in this radio adaptation Harold Pinter himself guides us through the story, speaking the 'big print' of the script as it sets each scene and describes establishing shots, closeups, long shots, scenes without dialogue ... all in the immediately recognisable language of film.	BBC Radio 3 Memory Evening
25 January 1996 (Recorded on 2 January 1996)	The American Wife	Richard Nelson	Melinda Walker, Zoë Wanamaker, Anton Lesser, Emily Richard, Oona Beeson, Oliver Cotton, John Sharian and Alan Marriott		BBC Radio 4 Thirty Minute Theatre
10 February 1996 (Recorded on 6 January 1996)	The Silent World of Nicholas Quinn	Colin Dexter dramatised by Guy Meredith	John Shrapnel, Robert Glenister, Richard Pasco, Meg Davies, Stephen Critchlow, David Timson, John Hartley, Lyndam Gregory and Roger May	Colin Dexter's Inspector Morse faces a puzzling trip into the world of deaf people with the murder of an invigilator in a foreign exam syndicate.	BBC Radio 4
15 February 1996 (Recorded on 14 January 1996)	Heartache	Mel Calman, text completed by Deborah Moggach.	Richard Griffiths, David Timson, Jim Broadbent, Tracy Wiles, Lee Montague, David de Keyser and Meg Davies	Cartoonist Mel Calman, who died two years previously, left a final play for radio in which all of a man's body parts rise up to resist his heart attack.	BBC Radio 4 Thirty Minute Theatre
22 February 1996 (Recorded on 28 January 1996)	The Chips Are Down	Israel Horovitz	Alice Arnold, Jane Whittenshaw, Ann Beach, Nicky Henson, Bob Sherman, Zulema Dene, Frances Tomelty and Israel Horovitz	A comedy of anxiety in New York City. Jeffrey, a writer, struggles with a magazine article.	BBC Radio 4 Thirty Minute Theatre
8 July 1996	Everybody Comes to Schicklgruber's	Marcy Kahan	Clive Swift, David Kossoff, Jane Whittenshaw, Keith Drinkel, Kerry Shale, Alice Arnold, Ann Beach, Bruce Purchase, Cyril Shaps, Kim Wall, Kristin Millward, Lee Montague, Steven Crossley, Timothy Bateson and Wolfe Morris	The war's been over for fifty years. Then Edward Schicklgruber, Adolf's cake cook brother, turns up in Vienna, just where he's been all along, doing what he does best. 1997 Silver Sony Award for Best Radio Play	BBC Radio 4
30 September 1996	American Faith	Mike Walker; Music by Neil Brand	Alan Marriott, Colin Stinton, William Roberts, William Dufris, John Sharian, Kate Harper, Ed Bishop, Garrick Hagon, Bob Sherman, Tara Hugo, Morgan Deare, Steven Crossley, Norman Chancer and William Hootkins	Richard Milhous Nixon's road to Watergate.	BBC Radio 4
18 November 1996 (Recorded on 21 April 1996)	The Voluptuous Tango	Text: David Zane Mairowitz; Music: Dominic Muldowney; Sound: Ian Dearden	Maria Friedman and Alan Belk	In Dominic Muldowney's score an erotically charged collision between two of the cultural stars of the 20th century makes for operatic radio. Isadora Duncan and F. T. Marinetti vie for carnal domination over a futurist meal... Winner: Prix Italia Special Prize for Fiction 1997; Sony Gold Award for Best Radio Drama 1997	BBC Radio 3 Between the Ears
14 December 1996	By Jeeves	P. G. Wodehouse adapted by Alan Ayckbourn	Steven Pacey, Malcolm Sinclair, Robert Austin, Diana Morrison, Simon Day, Nicholas Haverson, Lucy Tregear, Cathy Sara, Nicolas Collicos, Richard Long, Denise Silvey, Giles Taylor and Mike Windsor	Recorded with an audience at the BBC Radio Theatre, with the West End cast playing to piano accompaniment with the West End recording of the songs mixed in later.	BBC Radio 2
12 July 1997	The Westward Journey	Ellen Dryden	Carolyn Jones and Marcia Warren	"We are now beyond the Missouri River. We have left the States behind. Ahead of us lie the great uncivilised plains." On the wagon trains of the perilous migration across America to Oregon and California, the strength of women was tested against the ambition and pride of their men.	BBC Radio 4
30 August 1997	Love Story	Erich Segal dramatised by Juliet Ace	Ingri Damon, Mark Leake, Patrick Allen, Sheila Allen, John Guerrasio, David Brooks, William Dufris, Gerrard McDermott, Tracy-Ann Oberman and Christopher Wright Harpsichord: David Roblou	"What do you say about a twenty-five-year old girl who died? That she was brilliant? That she loved Mozart and Bach. And the Beatles. And me." The most potent romantic novel of the 1970s in a new dramatic version by Juliet Ace.	BBC Radio 4 Saturday Play
1 September 1997	As You Like It	William Shakespeare adapted by Ned Chaillet	Imogen Stubbs, Toby Stephens and Ronald Pickup	Shakespeare's comedy of true love, misplaced love, gender confusion and reconciliation.	BBC Radio 4 The Monday Play
23 October 1997	Goodbye Kiss	Ronald Harwood	Tom Courtenay and Peggy Phango	For Master Donny, a return to the South Africa he left as a youth offers a fragile hope of reconciliation. But it depends on Annie.	BBC Radio 4 Thirty Minute Theatre
20 December 1997	Bell, Book and Candle	John Van Druten adapted by Ned Chaillet	Beatie Edney, Stephen Moore, Ann Beach and Nicholas Boulton	Bewitched and bewildered, Anthony Henderson wanders into the Christmas cauldron of a Knightsbridge witches' coven just when Gillian Holroyd decides that she wants a new man in her life.	BBC Radio 4
29 December 1997	Fighting over Beverley	Israel Horovitz	Rosemary Harris, Ian Carmichael, Elizabeth McGovern and Israel Horovitz	A Yorkshireman belatedly flies to America to reclaim the war bride taken from him by an American war hero 45 years earlier.	BBC Radio 4
6 January 1998	Last Man Out	Steve May	Louise Lombard and Donald Sumpter	At the end of a night of jazz, only the drummer and the bar manager remain, packing up and picking over the ruins of their lives.	BBC Radio 4
3 February 1998	Phone Tag	Israel Horovitz	John Guerassio, Elizabeth Mansfield and Doreen Mantle	A transatlantic love affair is played out on the telephone as calls are missed, messages are left and confusion reigns.	BBC Radio 4
16 March 1998	Old Times	Harold Pinter	Julia Ormond, Michael Pennington, Cheryl Campbell and Harold Pinter	A darkly erotic drama. In an isolated country house, the past is about to come calling.	BBC Radio 4
6 April 1998	Summer with Monika	Roger McGough	Mark McGann and Katy Carmichael	Roger McGough's dramatisation of his magical poem of love in the 1960s.	BBC Radio 4
16 April 1998	The Monkey Bin	Bob Sherman	William Hootkins, Stefan Dennis and James Laurenson	British actors and would-be Mel Gibsons have flocked to Los Angeles for the 'pilot season', and Billy Bob's apartment house is the venue for high ambition and low plots.	BBC Radio 4 Afternoon Play
8 May 1998	The Captain's Wife	Juliet Ace	Patricia Hodge	As the years pass, a navy spouse moves from craving conformity to rebellion.	BBC Radio 4 Afternoon Play
15 June 1998	Stations of the Cross	Israel Horovitz	Israel Horovitz, Nicky Henson and Joanna Monro	David has returned from America, the land of his father, to make a farcical, poetic rail crossing of England to the home of his sister – and to an unforgettable funeral.	BBC Radio 4 Afternoon Play
3 July 1998	Love, Pray, and Do the Dishes	Robert Smith	Paul Bradley, Struan Rodger and Alice Arnold	A mobile phone ringing out in the middle of a Sunday service is the start of a media roller coaster ride for Father Andrew. Only his employer would ring him at work...	BBC Radio 4
15 July 1998 – 19 August 1998	Trust me, I'm a Policeman (Six-part series)	Robert Smith	John Woodvine, David Antrobus and Jan Winters	Detective Sergeant Matrix takes a reluctant work-experience youth on a stakeout and passes the time with highly unreliable tales of police work.	BBC Radio 4
14 August 1998	Victorville	Marcy Kahan	Stanley Kamel, David Ogden Stiers and William Hootkins	In Los Angeles last month, three actors recreated a crucial hour in cinema history – when Orson Welles delivered his verdict on the screenplay for Citizen Kane. At stake is the credit for the film, being written by Herman J Mankiewicz and overseen by John Houseman.	BBC Radio 4 Friday Play
21 August 1998	The Dish	Paul Hallam	Bette Bourne	Bette Bourne stars as China Dish, the role he played on stage to great critical acclaim. The intimate radio version provides an equally funny and chilling insight into the dying days of a Bournemouth bed-and-breakfast that has seen both joy and Aids. Music: Laka Daisical.	BBC Radio 4 Friday Play
7 February 1999	The Father	August Strindberg translated and adapted by Eivor Martinus	Ronald Pickup, Cheryl Campbell, Eleanor Moriarty, Tom Mannion, Christopher Good, Eve Pearce, Ben Crowe and Paul Panting	A mother knows her own child, but the seed of paternal doubt can poison a father's mind.	BBC Radio 3
8 February 1999	The Hairy Hand of Dartmoor	Michael McStay	Struan Rodger, Emily Richard and Angela Pleasence	Alcohol, anger, infidelity and stories of Dartmoor witches and the "hairy hand" are the ingredients in a cocktail party that goes dangerously awry for Geoffrey.	BBC Radio 4
26 March 1999	J Edgar Hoover: Red Scare	Mike Walker	William Hootkins, Bob Sherman, Kate Harper and Patrick Allen	The 24-year-old Hoover is charged with orchestrating America's first campaign against communism.	BBC Radio 4 Afternoon Play
2 April 1999	J Edgar Hoover: Public Enemy	Mike Walker	William Hootkins, Michael Neill, John Guerrasio, William Roberts, Mac MacDonald, Adam Sims and Dave Brooks	Hoover sheds his younger self and moves into the orbit of Walter Winchell, America's radio pundit, as they wage war against gangsters, creating and destroying heroes.	BBC Radio 4 Afternoon Play
9 April 1999	J Edgar Hoover: They Call Him Bobby	Mike Walker	William Hootkins and John Sharian	A powerful duologue for US Attorney General Robert F. Kennedy and J. Edgar Hoover. It is set in the volatile years of the Kennedy administration, when the civil rights movement, Martin Luther King Jr. and the war against the American Mafia were high on the Kennedy agenda.	BBC Radio 4 Afternoon Play
16 April 1999	J Edgar Hoover: Private and Confidential	Mike Walker	William Hootkins and David Soul	J. Edgar Hoover's life is reviewed by his lifelong companion and assistant director, Clyde Tolson.	BBC Radio 4 Afternoon Play
11 June 1999	The Old Man and the Sea	Ernest Hemingway dramatised by Bob Sherman	Rod Steiger, Ramon Estevez and David Allister	A dramatisation of the book which led to Hemingway's Nobel Prize for Literature. An old fisherman's epic struggle for one last great fish is a classic fable of the 20th century.	BBC Radio 4 Friday Play
7 October 1999	Bent's Business: Talk's Cheap	Peter R. Simpkin	James Faulkner, Amy Shindler and Brian Croucher	The glamour, and particularly the corruption, of the international art trade is Anthony Bent's business. In the first of two adventures, the theft of a Constable painting from a London gallery leads to death, and to Spain.	BBC Radio 4 Afternoon Play
14 October 1999	Bent's Business: An Old Flame	Peter R. Simpkin	James Faulkner, Amy Shindler and Brian Croucher	The glamour, and particularly the corruption, of the international art trade is Anthony Bent's business. In the second of two adventures, the murky underworld of international art theft threatens those nearest to him, and his own reputation.	BBC Radio 4 Afternoon Play
29 October 1999	On the Eve of the Millennium	Barrie Keeffe	Warren Mitchell, Karl Johnson, Cathy Tyson and Ioan Meredith	In a comic and touching performance, Mitchell evokes the rich humanity of a father determined to pass on a hidden heritage to his son – when his bouts with Alzheimer's disease permit.	BBC Radio 4 Friday Play
30 November 1999	1000 Years of Spoken English: Know What I Mean?	John Mortimer	Patricia Hodge, Michael Kitchen and Sylvester Williams	A marriage between a barrister and a management consultant is under threat when a Caller comes to visit, but they have the armoury of their professional languages on their side.	BBC Radio 4 Afternoon Play
30 November 1999	1000 Years of Spoken English: The Verger Queen	Neil Bartlett	Bette Bourne	An ancient verger in a historic church is disturbed by a tour party who sparks him into memories of hundreds of years of the church, forgotten pleasure gardens, and the coded world of a once-secret sexual culture.	BBC Radio 4 Afternoon Play
6 December 1999	Her Infinite Variety – Writing to Veronica	Juliet Ace	Eleanor Moriarty	Five 15-minute plays inspired by Shakespeare's Women. Faced with parental disapproval of the boy of her choice, a young Juliet of today at least has the internet and agony aunt Veronica.	BBC Radio 4 Woman's Hour Drama
7 December 1999	A Shout in the Distance	Maurice Leitch	Andrew Scott, Sorcha Cusack, T. P. McKenna, James Greene, Gavin Muir, Gavin Stewart, Valerie Lilley and Elizabeth Bell	A comedy of Irish manners is the last thing young Winston expects when he is uprooted from Northern Ireland and transplanted to London. But there is more than rhyming slang that he must learn to understand.	BBC Radio 4 Afternoon Play
8 December 1999	Her Infinite Variety – Diary of a Dutiful Daughter	Juliet Ace	Anna Massey	Faced with a doddering dad and a nursing home she runs as a business, what can a modern Goneril do but offer him the box room?	BBC Radio 4 Woman's Hour Drama
9 December 1999	Her Infinite Variety – And All That Jazz	Juliet Ace	Bette Bourne	Count Orso offers a modern Viola a spectacular twelfth night, with a wardrobe beyond most cross-dressers' dreams.	BBC Radio 4 Woman's Hour Drama
10 December 1999	Her Infinite Variety – Dirty Linen	Juliet Ace	Elizabeth Bell and Oliver Cotton	Everyone thought Rocky would tame the shrewish Cat, but 20 years of their tempestuous marriage is played out in a national newspaper.	BBC Radio 4 Woman's Hour Drama
14 December 1999	Alphabox	Jeff Noon dramatised by Mike Walker	Conrad Nelson, Gemma Saunders, Beth Chalmers, Harry Myers, Christopher Kellem, Tom George and Rosie Cavillero	Alphabox is a mysterious and almost fairytale-like short story based on letters and their relationship to story-telling. In the book, a writer has his letters hand-delivered to him each day one by one, in a mysterious wooden box.	BBC Radio 4 Afternoon Play
27 December 1999	The Deep End	Pete Lawson	Michelle Holmes, Patrick Nielsen and Stephen Hogan	A magical underwater world awaits Leni – if her cry from the depths of the public swimming baths can be heard.	BBC Radio 4 Afternoon Play
8 January 2000	Design for Murder	Marcy Kahan	Malcolm Sinclair, Eleanor Bron, Kristin Milward, Tam Williams, Nicholas Boulton, Gemma Saunders, Joe Dunlop and Don McCorkingdale	Actor, playwright, songwriter, director and star, Noël Coward never quite added sleuth to his astonishing achievements. But just before the war with Hitler, there is a gap in his memoirs – is there a murder mystery in those days?	BBC Radio 4 The Saturday Play
6 March 2000 – 10 March 2000	Father! Father! Burning Bright	Alan Bennett abridged by Ned Chaillet	Read by Alan Bennett	Alan Bennett reads his comic story in five parts.	BBC Radio 4 Book at Bedtime
13 March 2000 – 17 March 2000	Joe Gould's Secret	Joseph Mitchell abridged by Patrick Carroll	Read by Eli Wallach	A classic literary mystery by New Yorker journalist Joseph Mitchell, describing his true-life encounter with a Greenwich Village bohemian in the 1940s who claims to have written a great American book.	BBC Radio 4 Book of the Week
14 March 2000	The Lost Journals of Marina Tsvetayeva	Alan Pascoe	Diana Quick	Based on the life of the Russian poet Marina Tsvetayeva, who went into exile after the Revolution. Following her return to Russia in 1939, her husband was shot, and she killed herself in 1941.	BBC Radio 4 Afternoon Play
17 March 2000 – 7 April 2000	Jagged Prayer (Four-part crime series)	Robert Smith	Cheryl Campbell and Timothy Spall	Comedy drama combining crime, convents, police and perdition.	BBC Radio 4
16 May 2000	Zero Tolerance	Lloyd Evans	Nicky Henson, Ronald Pickup and Tom George	With trade advantages, increased tax revenue, and a handy mathematical superiority over the Pope's insistence on Roman numerals, should the doge of Venice declare war on the Vatican, particularly considering the doge's interest in his mathematician's wife?	BBC Radio 4 Afternoon Play
21 August 2000	Small Parts	Juliet Ace	Patricia Hodge	Seduced by the theatre, Mattie Potter joins a repertory company in Wales where she finds that the quick-change artistry of bit parts is a kind of preparation for life.	BBC Radio 4 Afternoon Play
3 October 2000	Three Chickens	William Stanton	Anton Lesser, Valerie Braddell and Suzanna Hamilton	On a magic island in Brazil, the Englishman William Marlow is seduced by tales of witchcraft. In a story about three chickens, he finds uncanny and uncomfortable echoes of a life he thought he had left behind him.	BBC Radio 4 Afternoon Play
13 October 2000	A Slight Ache	Harold Pinter	Harold Pinter and Jill Johnson	A husband and wife encounter a strange, mute matchseller. They each see something different in him.	BBC Radio 4
26 November 2000	Dr. Ibsen's Ghosts	Robert Ferguson	Paul Scofield, Morag Hood, Edna Doré and Michael N. Harbour	The story of the illegitimate son and the forgotten mother of the great Norwegian poet and playwright Henrik Ibsen.	BBC Radio 3
4 December 2000	Into the Ether	Andrew Dallmeyer	John Sharian and Holley Chant	At the height of the Cold War, American and Russian scientists lined up their psychics and telepaths in the service of the military. Ballistic missiles pale beside the power of the human mind at the beginning of the 90s, in this chilling drama.	BBC Radio 4 Afternoon Play
19 December 2000	Man in Snow	Israel Horovitz	Israel Horovitz, Marcia Warren, Dick Vosburgh and Burt Kwouk	As a climber escorts a group of honeymooners up Alaska's highest mountain he recalls his relationship with his dead son. 2001 Bronze Sony Award for Drama	BBC Radio 4 Afternoon Play
22 December 2000	The Tunnel Under the World	Frederik Pohl dramatised by Mike Walker	William Hope, Bob Sherman, Laurel Lefkow and Beth Chalmers	Guy wakes each morning from the same terrifying dream, but each day it is soothed away by special offers and an abundance of consumer goods. Then, one day, he begins to recall a little more.	BBC Radio 4 Afternoon Play
25 December 2000	The Man Who Came to Dinner	Moss Hart and George S. Kaufman adapted for radio by Marcy Kahan	Simon Callow, Elizabeth McGovern, Conleth Hill, Cheryl Campbell and John Sessions	A broken leg turns a visiting celebrity into a tyrannical house guest who mercilessly abuses a family's hospitality, in this classic 30s comedy.	BBC Radio 4
24 January 2001	The Polish Soldier	Gregory Evans	Jeremy Northam, Teresa Gallagher, Jillie Mears and Tom George	James, a man haunted by the disturbing image of a figure in an old-fashioned military uniform, is struggling to break the walls he has built around himself, but he must confront the pain and mystery of what happened in his childhood.	BBC Radio 4 Afternoon Play
10 February 2001	Feng Shui and Me	Barrie Keeffe	Phillip Joseph, Janet Maw, Jimmy Yuill and Gordon Reid	Chanting seems to help, but not even a Buddhist romance can quite quell Mick's craving for alcohol.	BBC Radio 4 The Saturday Play
18 May 2001	I'll be George	Snoo Wilson	Jane Lapotaire, Simon Callow, Federay Holmes, Jennie Stoller, Jasmine Hyde, Jonathan Keeble and Gordon Reid	George Sand was one of literature's freest spirits, and when she is evoked in present-day Paris by an Australian tour guide the result is a bawdy fantasia of mother and daughter relationships. With an incarnated Charles Dickens, the 19th century and 21st century collide in a turbulent and gritty morality tale.	BBC Radio 4 Friday Play
4 August 2001	A Dangerous Game	Shirley Cooklin	Suzanna Hamilton, Ray Lonnen, Roger May and Terence Edmond	When a paroled murderer kills after his release, all new paroles are frozen by the Home Office. A prisoner caught in this freeze on new paroles challenges the ruling and demands a psychological profile from a hardline psychiatrist – with explosive results.	BBC Radio 4 Saturday Play
1 September 2001	The Marseilles Trilogy: Marius	Marcel Pagnol adapted by Juliet Ace from a translation by Margaret Jarman	Richard Johnson, Simon Scardifield, Monica Dolan and Andrew Sachs	Marius, son of César, feels the pull of the sea, and is prepared to sacrifice his family and his love for beautiful Fanny to fulfil his dreams.	BBC Radio 4 The Saturday Play
8 September 2001	The Marseilles Trilogy: Fanny	Marcel Pagnol adapted by Juliet Ace from a translation by Margaret Jarman	Monica Dolan, Richard Johnson, Andrew Sachs and Simon Scardifield	The story of a lovely young woman abandoned by César's son Marius, who is unaware she is pregnant.	BBC Radio 4 The Saturday Play
15 September 2001	The Marseilles Trilogy: César	Marcel Pagnol adapted by Juliet Ace from a translation by Margaret Jarman	Richard Johnson, Simon Scardifield, Monica Dolan, Andrew Sachs, Tam Williams, Steve Hodson, Stephen Thorne, Struan Rodger, Phillip Joseph and Sean Baker	Twenty years after the events of the first play, the sad comedy of lost love is touched by a rich comedy of death and disclosure. A mother's secrets send her son off in search of a father he never knew.	BBC Radio 4 The Saturday Play
17 September 2001	Free Gift	Israel Horovitz	Maureen Lipman, Sophie Okonedo and Daniel Anthony	An Englishwoman in New York finds the most wonderful free gift when a child was left on her doorstep, but she lives in fear that the gift might be taken away.	BBC Radio 4 Afternoon Play
23 November 2001	Groupie	Arnold Wesker	Barbara Windsor and Timothy West	Matty reads the memoirs of a well-known artist from the East End, and she writes to him. He is down on his luck, living as a recluse, and has no work. Eventually, they meet, a few illusions are shattered and things develop in a way they had not foreseen.	BBC Radio 4
15 December 2001	The Gold Bug	Edgar Allan Poe dramatised by Gregory Evans	Clarke Peters, John Sharian, Rhashan Stone and William Hootkins	Set in 1838, this is Poe's story of piracy, slavery and a treasure hunt, with a critical overhaul to excise the 19th-century casual racism from this compelling tale of obsession.	BBC Radio 4 The Saturday Play
16 December 2001	Hecuba	Euripides translated and adapted by Timberlake Wertenbaker	Olympia Dukakis, Timothy West, Emma Fielding, Greg Hicks and Nicholas Woodeson	Greek tragedy	BBC Radio 3
17 December 2001	It's a Wonderful Divorce	Anthony Green	David Bamber and Sarah Paul	The love of Frank Capra's It's a Wonderful Life could become grounds for divorce as the season of goodwill approaches.	BBC Radio 4 Afternoon Play
11 January 2002	Damned If I Do	Dick Vosburgh, Peter Vincent, Fran Landesman and Simon Wallace		Mini-musical. New songs from songwriter Connie are laid out as a trap for her best friend Zoe.	BBC Radio 4 Afternoon Play
24 January 2002	Who Goes There? (Note: Produced by Ned Chaillet, directed by Rachel Horan)	John W. Campbell dramatised by Mike Walker	Liam Brennan, Ioan Meredith, Cyril Nri, Christopher Godwin, Harry Myers and Colin Adrian	Six men are trapped by a vicious snowstorm in an Antarctic research station.	BBC Radio 4 Chillers
28 January 2002	Swan Song	Agatha Christie dramatised by Mike Walker	Maria Friedman, Emily Woof, Sylvester Morand and Ray Lonnen	As if from nowhere, a soprano has emerged to become the Tosca of our day – but like Tosca she carries in her heart a terrible need for revenge.	BBC Radio 4
31 January 2002	I Have No Mouth, and I Must Scream	Harlan Ellison dramatised by Mike Walker	David Soul, Harlan Ellison, Abi Eniola, Ewan Bailey, David Timson and Jason O'Mara	After a computer wins mankind's last war, there is a final battle still to come, between it and the five surviving humans.	BBC Radio 4 Chillers
4 February 2002	Magnolia Blossom	Agatha Christie dramatised by Mike Walker	Emilia Fox, Julian Rhind-Tutt, Alex Jennings and Ewan Bailey	A woman's place is definitely not in the luxury home created for her by her financier husband. But in times of trouble a woman's loyalty can challenge the presumption of men – and infidelity can be a small crime compared to others.	BBC Radio 4
7 February 2002	Delta Sly Honey	Lucius Shepard dramatised by Mike Walker	Corey Johnson, Robert Petkoff, Sam Douglas and Ben Onwukwe	A country boy exorcises his demons in Vietnam by making late-night broadcasts to phantom military units – until one of them answers his call.	BBC Radio 4 Chillers
14 February 2002	Corona	Samuel R. Delany dramatised by Mike Walker	Josie Kook-Clarke, Walter Lewis, Doña Croll, John Moraitis, William Roberts and Bill Bailey	When a telepathic girl and a damaged young man are hospitalised, their two minds become entwined as the nightmares of his brutal past draw her in.	BBC Radio 4 Chillers
11 April 2002	The Titanic Inquiry – Part One	Bob Sherman	Kenneth Haigh, Nickolas Grace, Jill Johnson, John Sharian, Conrad Nelson, Ben Crowe, Barbara Barnes, Bob Sherman, Peter Marinker and Tom George	When the Titanic sank the owners of the White Star Line made every effort to return straight to England. An inquiry set up by the United States Senate held the surviving witnesses ashore in New York until questions could be answered.	BBC Radio 4 Afternoon Play
12 April 2002	The Titanic Inquiry – Part Two	Bob Sherman	Kenneth Haigh, John Sessions, John Sharian, Peter Marinker, Conrad Nelson, Ben Crowe, Tom George and Barbara Barnes	Testimony from the archives of the United States Senate investigation into the sinking of the Titanic moves on to an early confrontation with cheque book journalism in 1912. The inventor of the wireless, Guglielmo Marconi, takes the stand.	BBC Radio 4 Afternoon Play
18 April 2002	In Extremis	Neil Bartlett	Sheila Hancock and Corin Redgrave	It is March 1895, and Oscar Wilde consults a palm reader to help him with a momentous decision.	BBC Radio 4 Afternoon Play
29 April 2002	Meet Mr. Mulliner: Honeysuckle Cottage	P. G. Wodehouse dramatised by Roger Davenport	Richard Griffiths, Matilda Ziegler, Peter Acre, Martin Hyder, David Timson and Tom George	An engaging new series that brings one of Wodehouse's most entertaining characters to radio begins with one of the best loved of the tales. Richard Griffiths stars as the storytelling Mr Mulliner whose narratives enlist the regular tipplers of the Angler's Rest as participants. One of the Mulliner clan writes tough detective stories, but when he inherits the cottage of another family author he finds it haunted by the spirit of all her cloying romantic fiction. Marital bliss seems inevitable.	BBC Radio 4
6 May 2002	Meet Mr. Mulliner: A Slice of Life	P. G. Wodehouse dramatised by Roger Davenport	Richard Griffiths, Matilda Ziegler, Peter Acre, Martin Hyder, David Timson and Tom George	A gothic comedy of beauty preparations, thwarted love, a spooky old house, and a determined suitor. The regulars of the Angler's Rest parlour bar step into yet another of Mr Mulliner's quirky stories.	BBC Radio 4
13 May 2002	Meet Mr. Mulliner: The Smile that Wins	P. G. Wodehouse dramatised by Roger Davenport	Richard Griffiths, Matilda Ziegler, Peter Acre, Martin Hyder, David Timson and Carl Prekopp	In the bar parlour of the Angler's Rest, the regulars are drawn into another of Mr Mulliner's peculiar tales. When a dyspeptic detective member of the Mulliner family receives a doctor's prescription to smile, the frightening knowingness of his grin spreads terror throughout the titled classes.	BBC Radio 4
20 May 2002	Meet Mr. Mulliner: Open House	P. G. Wodehouse dramatised by Roger Davenport	Richard Griffiths, Matilda Ziegler, Peter Acre, Martin Hyder, David Timson and Marlene Sidaway	Never more Wodehousian than when faced with frightening aunts, terrifying ingenues and resourceful butlers, Mr Mulliner's tale today touches on a Mulliner whose callous dismissal of one young woman opens the door to vengeful neighbours, animal cruelty – and exile.	BBC Radio 4
27 May 2002	Meet Mr. Mulliner: Came The Dawn	P. G. Wodehouse dramatised by Roger Davenport	Richard Griffiths, Matilda Ziegler, Peter Acre, Martin Hyder, David Timson and Tom George	A transparent visage is the striking feature of Mr Mulliner's relative Lancelot in today's tale of indomitable love, poetry, parental obstruction and unexpected opportunities. Mr Mulliner stretches the credulity of his captive fellow tipplers in the Angler's Rest parlour bar, but as ever they are drawn into his story where the glitter of silent movies proves irresistible.	BBC Radio 4
3 June 2002	Meet Mr. Mulliner: Mulliner's Buck-U-Uppo	P. G. Wodehouse dramatised by Roger Davenport	Richard Griffiths, Matilda Ziegler, Peter Acre, Martin Hyder, David Timson, Carl Prekopp, Tom George and Sandra Clark	Pale young curates are rapidly going out of fashion. Augustine Mulliner, in particular, is transformed overnight into a tiger of a churchman when his aunt sends some of Uncle Wilfred's latest invention, a tonic called Mulliner's Buck-U-Uppo.	BBC Radio 4
9 July 2002	The Doctor's House	Alan Drury		A spectre is said to haunt a small Somerset village. Gerald's circumstances make him particularly vulnerable – but what is the real secret of the Doctor's House?	BBC Radio 4
20 October 2002	Coriolanus	William Shakespeare adapted by Ned Chaillet	Samuel West, Adrian Dunbar, Susannah York and Kenneth Haigh	Shakespeare's powerful Roman play The Tragedy of Coriolanus	BBC Radio 3 Drama on 3
21 October 2002 – 25 October 2002	The Crucible in History	Arthur Miller	Read by Arthur Miller	An account of the postwar anti-Communist paranoia which gripped America at the height of McCarthyism.	BBC Radio 4 Book of the Week
25 November 2002	Evaristo's Epitaph	Patrick Carroll, based on a true story.	Jasmine Hyde, Geoffrey Hutchings, Seun Shote, Diana Berriman, Samantha Robinson and Ben Crowe	The inscription on a tombstone in a Cornish churchyard tells the tale of a remarkable friendship between a master and an African slave. Unravelling the historical mystery of the genuine epitaph, Patrick Carroll's play is an inspired and tender re-creation of a remarkable true story.	BBC Radio 4 Afternoon Play
2 December 2002 – 6 December 2002	My Life as Me	Barry Humphries	Read by Barry Humphries	Barry Humphries casts off his Dame Edna Everage mantle to read from his hilarious autobiography in his own voice.	BBC Radio 4 Book of the Week
3 December 2002	A Man's Head	Georges Simenon dramatised by David Cregan	Nicholas Le Prevost, Julian Barnes, Ron Cook, Paul Birchard, Beth Chalmers, Philip Fox, Ifan Meredith, Tom George, Jane Whittenshaw and Ben Crowe	Maigret bends the rules to investigate a double murder in a Paris suburb.	BBC Radio 4 Afternoon Play
10 December 2002	The Bar on the Seine	Georges Simenon dramatised by Alison Joseph	Nicholas Le Prevost, Julian Barnes, Ron Cook, Timothy Watson, Sylvester Morand, Jonathan Tafler, Tracy Wiles, Rebecca Egan, Martin Hyder, Richard Firth, Scott Brooksbank, Emma Woolliams and Laura Doddington	Maigret puts his holiday on hold to tackle an unsolved murder.	BBC Radio 4 Afternoon Play
15 December 2002 – 29 December 2002	Adventures of Huckleberry Finn (Three episodes)	Mark Twain dramatised by Marcy Kahan	Mark Caven, Christopher Jacot, Martin Roach, Kay Hawtrey and Sandy Webster	The classic tale following Huck and the runaway slave Jim on their journey down the Mississippi on a raft. A Joint BBC/CBC Production with an all-Canadian cast, it was produced at CBC's Toronto studios.	BBC Radio 4 Classic Serial
17 December 2002	My Friend Maigret	Georges Simenon dramatised by David Cregan	Nicholas Le Prevost, Julian Barnes, Neil Dudgeon, Jonathan Keeble, Jilly Bond, Maggie McCarthy, Bunny Reed, Ewan Bailey, Martin Hyder, Richard Firth, Emma Woolliams, Simon Donaldson and Carla Simpson	On the seductive island of Porquerolles, a man is murdered when he claims the friendship of Chief Inspector Maigret. With a Scotland Yard detective in tow, Maigret is sent from Paris to investigate the death, and finds a dangerous and tempting dissolution – and some old acquaintances.	BBC Radio 4 Afternoon Play
20 December 2002	The Five of Us	Barrie Keeffe	Phil Davis, Nicholas Deal, Claire Rushbrook, Steven Diggory, Annabelle Apsion, Tony Rohr and Michael N. Harbour	Sex and drugs and rock and roll are the illusory dreams of Bruce in his mid-life crisis. But he forgets that he is also the older man, and finds that a ménage à trois can easily become an extended family.	BBC Radio 4 Friday Play
24 December 2002	Madame Maigret's Own Case	Georges Simenon dramatised by Alison Joseph	Nicholas Le Prevost Julian Barnes, Ron Cook, Julie Legrand, Paul Sirr, Victoria Carling, Nicholas Boulton, Carl Prekopp and Martin Hyder	Maigret's wife finds herself entangled in a case of murder when two human teeth are found in a bookbinder's furnace.	BBC Radio 4 Afternoon Play
28 January 2003	The Piano Player	William Bedford	Karl Johnson, Christopher Kelham, Kate Dudley, Philip Jackson, Paul Downing, Stephen Critchlow, Carolyn Backhouse and Martin Hyder	A pianist's marathon performance in a seaside town provides the evocative soundtrack for a tale of young love and first heartache. The music that conjures up a week in the 1950s still has the potency to bring back pain.	BBC Radio 4
24 February 2003	In a Glass Darkly	Agatha Christie dramatised by Mike Walker	Neil Dudgeon and Rebecca Egan	In a mirror, a man witnesses a murderous attack on a young woman just before he meets the woman and falls in love with her.	BBC Radio 4
24 February 2003	Righteous Brothers	Neil Brand	John Woodvine, Clive Swift, Tom George, Ioan Meredith, David Timson, Peter Luke Kenny and Carolyn Jones	Harmony is the joyful noise that Brother Caradoc wishes to offer to the Lord. He dreams of taking his fellow monks to a higher musical plane with him.	BBC Radio 4
10 March 2003	The Dressmaker's Doll	Agatha Christie dramatised by Mike Walker	Juliet Aubrey, Beth Chalmers, Stephen Critchlow, Gemma Saunders, Emma Woolliams and Connie Gurie	When a doll with a mind of its own comes into your life, it might be worth finding out what it wants. Agatha Christie for the 21st century is no less chilling for moving to the driving rhythms of London's catwalks in the cut-throat world of today's fashion.	BBC Radio 4
6 April 2003	One Day in the Life of Ivan Denisovich	Aleksandr Solzhenitsyn dramatised by Mike Walker	Neil Dudgeon, Philip Jackson, Paul Chan, Jonathan Tafler, Ben Onwukwe, Bruce Purchase, Matthew Morgan, Marty Rea, Stephen Critchlow, Ben Crowe, Seun Shote and Peter Darney	When Solzhenitsyn's shattering picture of Stalin's prison camps became an international bestseller in 1962, it seemed to signal a thaw in the Cold War. But Solzhenitsyn was a prophet about to be dishonoured in his own land, and the uncensored version of the novel did not appear until 1991 – the year after Solzhenitsyn's citizenship was restored in Russia. Following the routine of a single day in the camps, the story is a dynamic demonstration of human resilience.	BBC Radio 4 The Saturday Play
10 April 2003	Swan-song for the Nightingale	Maurice Leitch	Sorcha Cusack, Marty Rea, James Ellis, John Rogan, Stephen Hogan, James Greene and Norma Sheahan	The sound of country music rings alarm bells for young Kevin, when it means that his 'has-been alcoholic' mother hits the comeback trail in Ireland, and wants to take him along. But he has a lot to learn about his mother, and other stars of yesteryear.	BBC Radio 4 Afternoon Play
12 September 2003	Speaking Well of the Dead	Israel Horovitz	Jill Clayburgh, Lily Rabe and Israel Horovitz	Penelope speaks well of her husband, who was killed at the World Trade Center, and her daughter, Willa, wants to speak the truth. It would mean killing her father again.	BBC Radio 4 Friday Play
14 October 2003	The Chicken Woman	Eryl Maynard	Eryl Maynard, Jean Heywood, Fine Time Fontayne and Matilda Ziegler	Chickens first come into the Chicken Woman's life while she and her husband strive for children. Defending her 'girls' against the Fox; nursing them into health, and comforting them in her bed, she is adamantly not obsessed. But the neighbours have another view.	BBC Radio 4 Afternoon Play
8 November 2003	A Bullet at Balmain's	Marcy Kahan	Malcolm Sinclair, Eleanor Bron, Tam Williams, Linda Marlowe, Susy Kane, Jaimi Barbakof, William Hootkins and Frances Jeater	Noël Coward is in post-liberation Paris, 1948, to play the lead, in French, in his own play "Present Laughter". But the murder of a promiscuous mannequin provides him with a crime to solve	BBC Radio 4
12 December 2003	Dead-Heading the Roses	Juliet Ace	Jill Balcon, Daniel Day-Lewis, Cheryl Campbell, Graham Crowden and William Hootkins	Ariadne, a naval officer's wife, has become the benign queen of death, arranging tasteful memorial services – which will include her husband's. But before his departure he has plotted a final fling.	BBC Radio 4 Afternoon Play
9 January 2004	A Kind of Home – James Baldwin in Paris	Caryl Phillips	Ricky Fearon, Ronald Pickup, Tom Silburn, Alibe Parsons, Declan Wilson, Lydia Leonard, Jaimi Barbakoff, Damian Lynch, Lisa Davina Phillip, Ryan McCluskey, Roger May, Timothy Morand, Bob Sherman, Rachel Atkins and Chris Moran	Covers the period from the war's end to the publication of Go Tell It on the Mountain.	BBC Radio 4 Friday Play
6 February 2004	More Mr. Mulliner: The Bishop's Move	P. G. Wodehouse dramatised by Roger Davenport	Richard Griffiths, Matilda Ziegler, Tom George, David Timson, Martin Hyder and Peter Acre	Mr Mulliner returns to the Angler's Rest public house, where the regulars are once again ready to be transported into the roles of the characters in his fabulous stories. It is their urging that brings him back to the massively potent tonic, Buck-U-Uppo, which can transform a timid cleric into a tiger, and is even more dangerous when a bishop imbibes it.	BBC Radio 4
13 February 2004	More Mr. Mulliner: The Ordeal of Osbert Mulliner	P. G. Wodehouse dramatised by Roger Davenport	Richard Griffiths, Peter Darney, Matilda Ziegler, David Timson, Martin Hyder, Peter Acre and Stephen Critchlow	This time, it is the timid Osbert Mulliner whose trials and tribulations begin when he falls in love, putting him at risk from a ferocious explorer and an even more ferocious uncle of the damsel. Rarely can a man have been so grateful for burglars.	BBC Radio 4
20 February 2004	More Mr. Mulliner: The Knightly Quest of Mervyn	P. G. Wodehouse dramatised by Roger Davenport	Richard Griffiths, Matilda Ziegler, Tom George, Martin Hyder, David Timson, Peter Acre, Joanna McCallum and Gbemisola Ikemelo	Only one of Mr Mulliner's many relatives appears to be a 'chump', young Mervyn Mulliner who demands a knightly quest to prove his love to the glamorous Clarice. It is December, in the 1920s, and she craves strawberries.	BBC Radio 4
27 February 2004	More Mr. Mulliner: The Truth About George	P. G. Wodehouse dramatised by Roger Davenport	Richard Griffiths, Matilda Ziegler, Peter Darney, Martin Hyder, David Timson, Peter Acre, Damian Lynch and Lydia Leonard	Mr Mulliner's final tale to the regulars at the Angler's Rest public house is about his crossword obsessed nephew, George, and his attempt to be as fluent in his speech to his beloved as he is in a crossword puzzle. Once again, the regulars fall into the story in a crazed journey across the English countryside, pursued by lunatics and farmers.	BBC Radio 4
8 March 2004	Skin	Juliet Ace	Patricia Hodge	Mattie's road to liberation and success sees her shedding her clothes on a naturist beach only to be asked for her autograph; but the sun also has its shadows. A wry and powerfully affecting tale of sun, flesh, naturism and mortality.	BBC Radio 4 Afternoon Play
19 April 2004	Maigret and the Burglar's Wife	Georges Simenon dramatised by Alison Joseph	Nicholas Le Prevost, Julian Barnes, Julie Legrand, Rachel Atkins, Jill Johnson, Philip Franks, Tom George, Scott Brooksbank, Jennie Stoller, Philip Fox and Alice Hart	A thief's wife comes back from the detective's past. Chief Inspector Maigret last met Ernestine when he was a young policeman, and she refused to put her clothes on so he could arrest her. But now he must choose to believe her story about a murdered woman discovered by her burglar husband, or believe the respectable dentist who denies there ever was a burglary.	BBC Radio 4 Afternoon Play
26 April 2004	The Yellow Dog	Georges Simenon dramatised by David Cregan	Nicholas Le Prevost, Julian Barnes, Cherie Taylor, Chris Moran, Phillip Joseph, Philip Fox, Michael Fenton Stevens, Ioan Meredith, Joe Dunlop, Steven Diggory, Damian Lynch, Francis Jeater and Rachel Atkins	The Yellow Dog finds Maigret away from his Paris patch, in a sordid tale set in Brittany where one of the town worthies has been shot – through a letter box – and a wandering dog spreads panic among the citizens.	BBC Radio 4 Afternoon Play
3 May 2004	Inspector Cadaver	Georges Simenon dramatised by David Cregan	Nicholas Le Prevost, Julian Barnes, Michael N. Harbour, David Bannerman, Karen Archer, Philip Fox, John Rowe, Alice Hart, Joanna McCallum and Scott Brooksbank	It was only as a favour to his inspecting magistrate that Chief Inspector Maigret agreed to investigate rumours about a death in the village of St Aubin. But when he arrives he finds his investigation undermined by an old adversary, the disgraced Inspector 'Cadaver'. Baulked by a town united in silence, Maigret is determined to uncover the truth – however ugly.	BBC Radio 4 Afternoon Play
10 May 2004	Maigret's Little Joke	Georges Simenon dramatised by Alison Joseph	Nicholas Le Prevost, Julian Barnes, Julie Legrand, Phillip Joseph, Philip Fox, Harry Myers, Jaimi Barbakoff, Cherie Taylor-Battiste, Chris Moran, Rachel Atkins and Ioan Meredith	When a particularly sensational murder takes place in Paris, Chief Inspector Maigret is on holiday and must follow the investigation like any member of the public, through newspapers and news flashes. How can he keep his promise to Mme Maigret and let Inspector Janvier get on with solving the crime when he is haunted by the question: why the devil was the murdered woman naked?	BBC Radio 4 Afternoon Play
30 July 2004	Stan	Neil Brand	Tom Courtenay, Ewan Bailey, Ed Bishop and Barbara Barnes	As death finally threatens to separates the greatest double-act in film comedy, Stan Laurel tries to say the things which have been left unsaid, in a poignant and powerful farewell to Oliver Hardy.	BBC Radio 4 Afternoon Play
23 August 2004	The Coast of Maine: Miss Tempy's Watchers	Sarah Orne Jewett dramatised by David James	Joanna McCallum, Sheila Allen and Susan Jameson	Miss Tempy's Watchers sees two estranged friends finding their old bonds of affection as they watch over the body of a beloved friend the night before her funeral.	BBC Radio 4 Woman's Hour Drama
24 August 2004	The Coast of Maine: The Queen's Twin	Sarah Orne Jewett dramatised by David James	Susannah York, Nathan Osgood, Joanna McCallum and Brian Flaherty	Mrs Abby Martin, a woman born at exactly the same moment as Queen Victoria (allowing for the time difference between England and New England), tells the tale of their parallel lives.	BBC Radio 4 Woman's Hour Drama
25 August 2004	The Coast of Maine: Captain Littlepage	Sarah Orne Jewett dramatised by David James	Alec McCowen, Jon Glover, Tam White, Joanna McCallum and Barbara Barnes	A sea captain with a memory to share of meeting an ancient Scots mariner who sailed into uncharted waters, and discovered a strange land with no place for the living.	BBC Radio 4 Woman's Hour Drama
26 August 2004	The Coast of Maine: Miss Esther's Guest	Sarah Orne Jewett dramatised by David James	Susan Engel, Joanna McCallum, Jon Glover and Nancy Crane	Seeing it as a duty to provide a country break for a city-dwelling church member, Miss Esther offers to take in a guest from Boston. The visitor is not the old lady she expects.	BBC Radio 4 Woman's Hour Drama
27 August 2004	The Coast of Maine: The Town Poor	Sarah Orne Jewett dramatised by David James	Angela Pleasence, Carolyn Jones, Joanna McCallum, Alice Hart, Jennifer Hilary and Eve Pearce	Having fallen on hard times, the Bray sisters have been placed out of sight on a remote farm where they won't disturb the town's conscience. A chance visit by two old friends puts their lives in shocking contrast.	BBC Radio 4 Woman's Hour Drama
26 September 2004	Hippomania	Snoo Wilson	Anthony Calf, Anastasia Hille, Patricia Leventon, Andrew Woodall, Victoria Woodward, Ian Masters, Owen Sharpe, Katherine Igoe, Stephen Hogan, Renee Weldon, Aoife McMahon, Gerard Murphy, John Rogan, Nicholas Boulton, Jimmy Akingbola, Ndidi del Fatti, Andrew Scott, Tam Williams, Snoo Wilson, Alex Tregear, Emily Wachter, Jason Chan, Robert Hastie and Stuart McLoughlin	With Laurence Olivier preparing to film the patriotic epic Henry V in neutral Ireland during the Second World War, and the poet John Betjeman attracting the suspicious attention of the IRA, it is a heady time in Dublin. Snoo Wilson's astonishing fantasia, which springs from real events in Betjeman's life, conjures up Nazis, assassins and fairies as the poet wanders blithely through seats of power, pubs and a cemetery.	BBC Radio 3 Drama on 3
18 October 2004 – 22 October 2004	The Two of Us – My Life with John Thaw (Five episodes)	Sheila Hancock	Read by Sheila Hancock	Sheila Hancock reads from her enthralling new book about her deep and passionate partnership with her late husband, John Thaw.	BBC Radio 4 Book of the Week
11 December 2004	Death at the Desert Inn	Marcy Kahan	Malcolm Sinclair, Eleanor Bron, Tam Williams, Belinda Lang, Jake Broder, Meredith MacNeil, Peter Swander, Nathan Osgood and William Hootkins	Three hundred thousand dollars are left in a satchel in Noël Coward's Las Vegas suite. Coward sets off on his unexpected posthumous career as a detective. The Desert Inn, scene of one of his greatest cabaret triumphs, is the setting for a murder mystery complete with Judy Garland, a showgirl, a Broadway agent, an unlikely croupier and a US Congressman, with half of Hollywood in the audience.	BBC Radio 4 The Saturday Play
15 January 2005	The Salamander Letter	Dylan Ritson	Glenn Conroy, Adam Sims and Jason Chan	Drama about crooked antiques dealer Mark Hofmann, who nearly succeeded in rewriting American history and bringing down the LDS Church when his forgeries fooled experts around the world.	BBC Radio 4 The Saturday Play
23 February 2005	Something Cool	Maurice Leitch	Linda Marlowe, Jim Norton, Alyson Coote, Bruno Lastra and Claudio Rojas	In a Spanish bar, far out of the tourist season, Rose sits and waits for something to happen. As the happy hour draws to a close, two strangers appear and the scene is set for an intense and unexpected confrontation.	BBC Radio 4 Afternoon Play
7 March 2005	Scenes of Seduction	Timberlake Wertenbaker	Michael Maloney, Jasmine Hyde and Harriet Walter	Five-scene drama involving courting couples in various stages of life. The scene entitled Summer rewrites the wooing scene of Shakespeare's Henry V.	BBC Radio 4 Afternoon Play
13 March 2005	Hotel Cristobel	Caryl Phillips	Rosemary Harris, Michael Potts and Stephen Spinella	Caribbean independence is re-imagined in a struggle for control of a fading hotel on a small and beautiful island. The English woman who has always managed and owned Hotel Cristobel cannot accept that her era is over and that her servant John and the mysterious visitor Mr Schultz from New York might take her hotel away. The play, recorded in New York, is a gripping drama of power, and perhaps love.	BBC Radio 3 Drama on 3
2 May 2005	Claw Marks on the Curtain: The Lumber Room	Saki dramatised by Roger Davenport	Susan Engel, Ben Tibber and Alex Tregear	When young Nicholas is punished by his aunt, he seeks refuge in the magical lumber-room; but when his aunt seeks him in the garden, he can exact retribution.	BBC Radio 4 Woman's Hour Drama
3 May 2005	Claw Marks on the Curtain: The Schartz-Metterklume Method	Saki dramatised by Roger Davenport	Philip Fox, Emily Wachter, Timothy Morand, Jennie Stoller and Jemma Churchill	When Lady Carlotta is mistaken for Miss Hope, the new governess, she takes up the job with relish, applying a freshly invented technique of child-rearing to her new charges. The ensuing chaos is all too modern for the parents.	BBC Radio 4 Woman's Hour Drama
4 May 2005	Claw Marks on the Curtain: Fur	Saki dramatised by Roger Davenport	Bertie Carvel, Helen Longworth, Lydia Leonard and Alex Tregear	Eleanor and Suzanne are best friends, but not for much longer. Suzanne knows she can get her rich cousin Bertram to buy her a fur in the sales, but she has to entrust the job to Eleanor, who has her own plans.	BBC Radio 4 Woman's Hour Drama
5 May 2005	Claw Marks on the Curtain: The Toys of Peace	Saki dramatised by Roger Davenport	Anton Rice, Ben Tibber, Anthony Calf, Beth Chalmers and Alex Tregear	Harvey is encouraged by his right-thinking sister to give her two sons toys that cannot be used for war. Of course children, in a Saki tale, are immensely inventive.	BBC Radio 4 Woman's Hour Drama
6 May 2005	Claw Marks on the Curtain: The Open Window	Saki dramatised by Roger Davenport	Susan Jameson, Paul Brooke, Michael Kilgarriff, Joanna McCallum and Emily Chenery	Packed off around Britain in a search for a cure for his nerves, Framton Nuttel arrives at the Sappletons' house with a letter of introduction from his sister. It little prepares him for the tale of terror he is about to hear	BBC Radio 4 Woman's Hour Drama
2 June 2005	The Miracle of Reason	Nick Dear	Frances Tomelty and Jasper Britton	A menacing drama about a dirty weekend that spirals into abject terror.	BBC Radio 3 The Wire
7 June 2005	Grief	Ellen Dryden	Abigail Thaw, Michael Pennington, Isla Blair and Michael N. Harbour	Simon's despair at the sudden death of his wife, Sarah, is only too clear to everyone. Their perfect marriage was legendary, but their best friend Nick is tormented by his sense of loss, and there is no one he can share it with. Especially not with his partner, Isabel.	BBC Radio 4 Afternoon Play
2 August 2005	I Enjoyed Myself Today	Eryl Maynard	Alex Tregear and Samantha Bond	Freya's diaries reflect the world around her in the 1960s: the Vietnam War, whether to dye her hair. But when her menopausal self discovers them, lyrical with hormonal pubescence, she has things to say in return.	BBC Radio 4 Afternoon Play
10 October 2005	Voices	Text: Harold Pinter; Music: James Clarke	Harry Burton, Anastasia Hille, Andy de la Tour, Douglas Hodge, Gabrielle Hamilton, Roger Lloyd Pack, Gawn Grainger, Harold Pinter and Indira Varma	An experimental collage of voice and sound.	BBC Radio 3
28 November 2006	The Lost Love of Phoebe Myers aka Lost Love of Phoebe Miles	Bernard Kops	Tracy-Ann Oberman, David de Keyser, Heather Coombs, Qarie Marshall, Lucy Middleweek and Miranda Keeling	Bernard Kops's new play evokes the resilience and passions of wartime London and embarks on a journey through heartache and abandonment, while offering a promise of ultimate contentment and the exorcism of ghosts.	BBC Radio 4 Afternoon Play
11 December 2006 – 15 December 2006	A House to Let	Charles Dickens, Wilkie Collins and Elizabeth Gaskell dramatised by Martyn Wade	Marcia Warren and Alec McCowen	Charles Dickens, Wilkie Collins and Elizabeth Gaskell's Victorian tale of a woman worried about an unsettling sign of life in a derelict house.	BBC Radio 4 Woman's Hour Drama
11 March 2008	Needle	Christina Balit	Peter Marinker, Jade Williams, Meg Davies, Kate Williams, Liz Sutherland, Liza Sadovy and Ben Onwukwe	Creating the Bayeux Tapestry for their Norman conquerors is a bitter task for the women of Canterbury.	BBC Radio 4 Afternoon Play
30 March 2008	A Long Way from Home	Caryl Phillips	O-T Fagbenle, Kerry Shale, Alibe Parson, Rhea Bailey, Rachel Atkins, Damian Lynch, Ben Onwukwe and Major Wiley	Caryl Phillips' original drama imagines the conflicting forces in the iconic singer Marvin Gaye's life, including family, stardom, love, sex and drugs. The story focuses on his final years, when he was offered a lifeline in the unlikely setting of Ostend in Belgium, where he composed the song Sexual Healing before he returned America and was murdered by his own father.	BBC Radio 3 Drama on 3
20 September 2008	Bora Bora	Lynne Truss	Derek Jacobi, Corin Redgrave, Cheryl Campbell, Adrian Bower, Eve Pearce, Jill Johnson, Stephen Critchlow and Rachel Atkins	Art historian Alec, the brother of a famous actor, has lived his life in the shadows following a traumatic event in his childhood. When a biographer joins a painting holiday organised by Alec, his arrival disturbs the calm. Alec must face a terrible truth about his life and about the nature of forgiveness.	BBC Radio 4 The Saturday Play
7 June 2009	Hyde Park-on-Hudson	Richard Nelson	Barbara Jefford, Emma Fielding, Tim Pigott-Smith, Nancy Crane, Julia Swift, Sylvia Syms, John Chancer, Corin Redgrave, Kika Markham and Jamie Newall	No reigning British monarch had ever been to the United States before George VI's visit in 1939, just on the cusp of a new world war. History was in the making when the King and Queen arrived at President Roosevelt's upstate New York home, with a promise of politics, a picnic and hot dogs. But the private life of the President provided a whole new dimension to an epochal moment, at least in the memory of his lover.	BBC Radio 3 Drama on 3

Notes:

Sources:

- Ned Chaillet's radio play listing at Diversity website
- Ned Chaillet's radio play listing at RadioListings website
- Ned Chaillet's radio play listing at Audio Drama Wiki

== Journalism ==
- "Family Voices – Lyttelton", review, The Times, 18 February 1981
- "There is every chance that they are a notable past in the making", The Times, August 1981 (predicting the future for Tony Slattery, Emma Thompson, Stephen Fry and Hugh Laurie from their Edinburgh Fringe debut in 1981)
- "The third man reconstructed", The Independent, 3 August 1998
- Bradley Lavelle Obituary, The Stage, 23 April 2007
- "Erik Bauersfeld, American radio dramatist and producer", Bay Area Radio Drama, 2007
- Harold Pinter Obituary, BBC World Service, 25 December 2008
- Harold Pinter Obituary, The Stage, 29 December 2008
- Jill Balcon Obituary, The Stage, 28 July 2009
- Corin Redgrave Obituary, Last Word, BBC Radio 4, 9 April 2010 (15'50" – 24'05")
- Anna Massey Obituary, The Stage, 19 July 2011
- Miriam Karlin Obituary, The Stage, 22 August 2011
- Gerard Murphy Obituary, The Stage, 9 September 2013
- Betty Davies Obituary, The Guardian, 18 February 2018
- Richard Williams Obituary, The Guardian, 26 Aug 2019
- John Tydeman Obituary, The Guardian, 4 May 2020
