= John Sharian =

English actor (born 1964)

- Born: John Shahnazarian; 1964 (age 61–62); London, England, United Kingdom
- Education: Taft School; Bristol Old Vic Theatre School
- Occupation: Actor
- Years active: 1992–present
- Spouses: Tara Fitzgerald (m. 2001; div. 2003) Nicola Davies (m. 2005)

John Sharian (born John Shahnazarian; 1964) is an English actor. He appeared in the film The Machinist (2004).

== Early life and education ==
Part of Sharian's family is of Armenian descent.

Sharian attended the Taft School in Watertown, Connecticut and later Kenyon College in Gambier, Ohio, which he left in 1984.

== Career ==
Sharian graduated from the Bristol Old Vic Theatre School in 1991 and began television acting shortly thereafter, appearing in the British sci-fi comedy series Red Dwarf in 1992.

Sharian's film career began in 1994 with his role as one of the leads in Death Machine. He also appeared in The Fifth Element (1997), Saving Private Ryan (1998) and The Machinist (2004).

Sharian is a member of the Armenian Dramatic Arts Alliance.

== Selected filmography ==
- 1992: Red Dwarf (TV Series, Episode: "Back to Reality") - New Lister
- 1994: Death Machine - Sam Raimi
- 1997: The Fifth Element - Fhloston Captain
- 1998: Grave of the Fireflies (Central Park Media version, voice)
- 1998: Lost in Space - Noah Freeman
- 1998: Saving Private Ryan - Corporal
- 1999: Driver - (Video Game) (voice)
- 1999: New World Disorder - Rice
- 1999: Do Not Disturb - Bodyguard
- 2000: Fortress 2: Re-Entry - Hickey
- 2000: 24 Hours in London - Tony
- 2000: Jason and the Argonauts (TV Mini-Series) - Pollux
- 2000: Chicken Run - Circus Man (voice, uncredited)
- 2001: Gothic (Video Game) - Milten (English version, voice)
- 2002: Vietcong (Video Game) - (voice)
- 2003: Dracula II: Ascension (Direct-to-DVD-Production) - Officer Hodge
- 2003: Gothic II (Video Game) - (voice)
- 2003: Calendar Girls - Danny
- 2003: Love Actually - Wisconsin Taxi Driver
- 2004: The Machinist - Ivan
- 2004: Vietcong: Fist Alpha (Video Game) - (voice)
- 2004: Romasanta - Antonio
- 2004: Sex Traffic (TV Mini-Series) - Barry Edwards
- 2005: Spooks (TV Series) - Michael Gorman
- 2006: Land of the Blind - Guy in Strip Club
- 2007: WΔZ - Jack Corelli
- 2007-2010: CSI: Miami (TV Series, 2 episodes) - Joe LeBrock
- 2008: New Amsterdam (TV Series) - Jack Shaw
- 2009: Law & Order (TV Series) - George Darvey
- 2009: Staten Island - Tarquinio
- 2010: Law & Order: Criminal Intent (TV Series) - Jan Van Dekker
- 2010: Red Dead Redemption (Video Game) - The Local Population (voice)
- 2010: Boy Wonder - Joe Mancini
- 2010: Rocksteady - Big Red
- 2011: 3 Weeks to Daytona - Gomes
- 2012: Disconnect - Ross Lynd
- 2015: True Story - Lincoln County Lobby Sheriff
- 2016: Horace and Pete (TV Series) - Jerold
- 2017: Patti Cake$ - Lou
- 2018: Accommodations - Vital Vekselberg
- 2019: The Kitchen - Duffy

== Radio ==
Date	Title	Role	Director	Station
25 January 1996	The American Wife		Ned Chaillet	BBC Radio 4 Thirty Minute Theatre
30 September 1996	American Faith		Ned Chaillet	BBC Radio 4
9 April 1999	J Edgar Hoover: They Call Him Bobby		Ned Chaillet	BBC Radio 4 Afternoon Play
4 December 2000	Into the Ether		Ned Chaillet	BBC Radio 4 Afternoon Play
8 July 2001	Wit	Jason Posner	Gaynor Macfarlane	BBC Radio 4
15 December 2001	The Gold Bug	Legrand	Ned Chaillet	BBC Radio 4 The Saturday Play
11 April 2002	The Titanic Inquiry – Part One	Senator Fletcher	Ned Chaillet	BBC Radio 4 Afternoon Play
12 April 2002	The Titanic Inquiry – Part Two	Senator Fletcher	Ned Chaillet	BBC Radio 4 Afternoon Play
8 June 2002	Man of All Work	Dave	Pauline Harris	BBC Radio 4 The Saturday Play
17 January 2004	The Ipcress File	Battersby	Toby Swift	BBC Radio 4 Saturday Play
