= Soteriou =

Soteriou is a surname. Notable people with the surname include:

- Constantinos Soteriou (born 1996), Cypriot footballer
- Mia Soteriou (fl. 2001), British musician and actress
