= Cultural impact of Noël Coward =

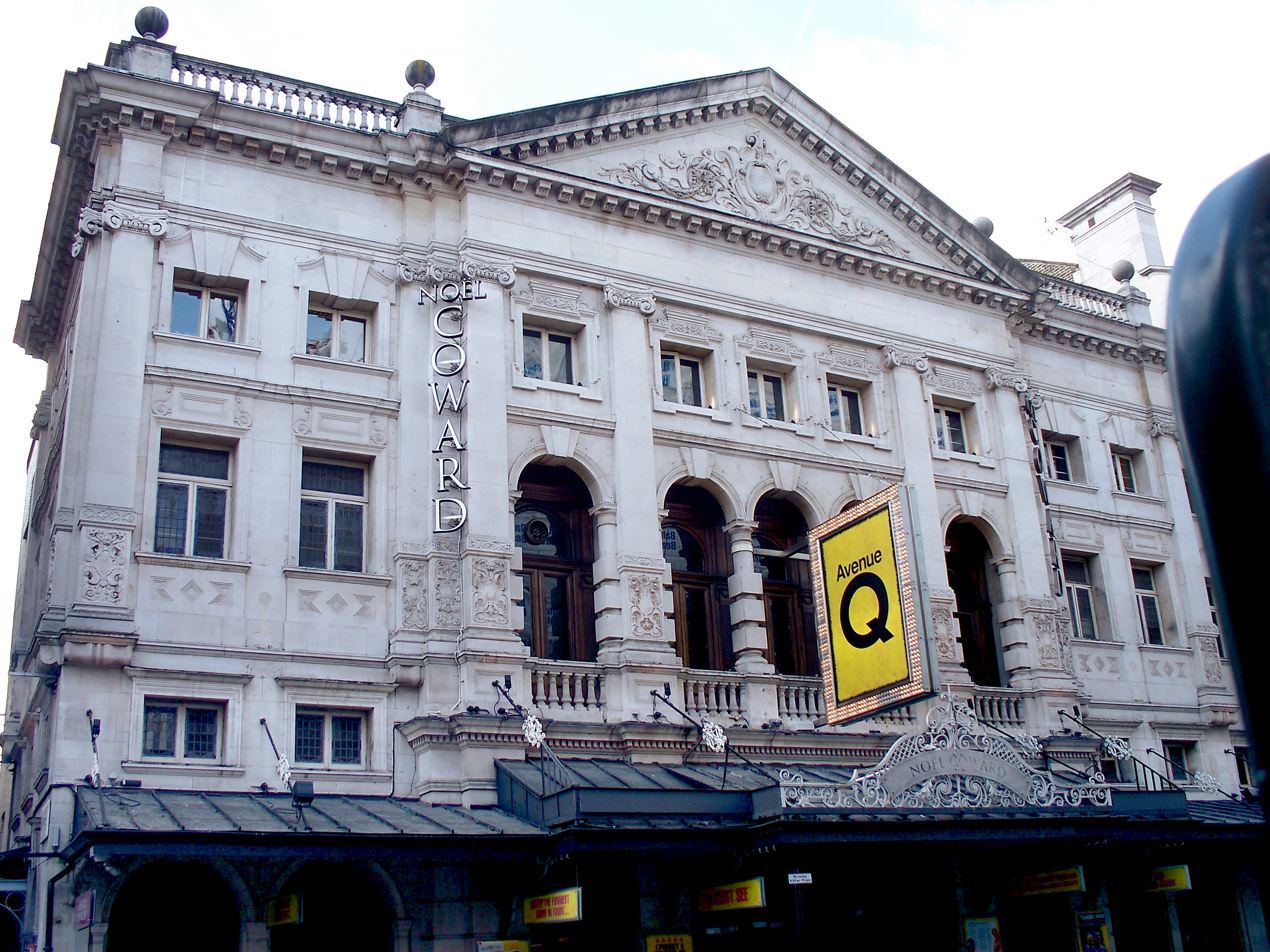
The Noël Coward Theatre in London

A prolific playwright and successful actor and director, Noël Coward had a significant impact on culture in the English-speaking world. Time magazine said that he had a unique "sense of personal style, a combination of cheek and chic, pose and poise".

Coward wrote over 50 published plays and many albums of original songs, in addition to musical theatre (including the operetta Bitter Sweet), comic revues, poetry, short stories, a novel and three volumes of autobiography. Books of his song lyrics, diaries and letters also have been published. Some of his plays, such as Hay Fever, Private Lives, Design for Living, Present Laughter and Blithe Spirit, have entered the regular theatre repertoire. His stage and film acting and directing career spanned six decades, and his cabaret performances were very popular in the 1950s and 1960s. Coward won an Academy Honorary Award in 1943 for his naval film drama In Which We Serve. Many of Coward's plays were adapted for film.

Coward was knighted in 1969 and was elected a fellow of the Royal Society of Literature. A statue of Coward was unveiled by the Queen Mother in the foyer of the Theatre Royal, Drury Lane in 1998. The Noël Coward Theatre in St Martin's Lane, originally called the New Theatre, was renamed in his honour in 2006.

== Critical reputation and legacy ==
The playwright John Osborne said, "Mr Coward is his own invention and contribution to this century. Anyone who cannot see that should keep well away from the theatre." Kenneth Tynan wrote in 1964, "Even the youngest of us will know, in fifty years' time, exactly what we mean by 'a very Noel Coward sort of person'." The Times said of him, "None of the great figures of the English theatre has been more versatile than he," and the paper ranked his plays in "the classical tradition of Congreve, Sheridan, Wilde and Shaw". In praise of his versatility, another admirer said, "There are probably greater painters than Noël, greater novelists than Noël, greater librettists, greater composers of music, greater singers, greater dancers, greater comedians, greater tragedians, greater stage producers, greater film directors, greater cabaret artists, greater TV stars. If there are, they are fourteen different people. Only one man combined all fourteen different labels – The Master."

A symposium published in 1999 marked the centenary of Coward's birth and listed some major productions of Coward shows scheduled for the year in Britain and North America, including Ace of Clubs, After the Ball, Blithe Spirit, Cavalcade, Easy Virtue, Hay Fever, Present Laughter, Private Lives, Sail Away, Song at Twilight, The Young Idea and Waiting in the Wings, with stars including Lauren Bacall, Wendy Craig, Fenella Fielding, Derek Griffiths, Rosemary Harris, Michael Jayston, Penelope Keith, Anton Lesser, Geraldine McEwan, Ian McKellen, Marie McLaughlin, Corin Redgrave, Greta Scacchi, Juliet Stevenson and Elaine Stritch. Tim Rice said of Coward's songs: "The wit and wisdom of Noël Coward's lyrics will be as lively and contemporary in 100 years' time as they are today," and many have been recorded by Paul McCartney, Sting, Elton John, Robbie Williams, Pet Shop Boys, The Divine Comedy, Vic Reeves, Ian Bostridge, Damon Albarn, Michael Nyman, and others. Joan Sutherland, Adam Lambert, Judy Garland and Frank Sinatra. Recordings of Coward's songs have been heard in films, such as Bridget Jones: Mad About the Boy, video games and advertising.

== Parodies and popular culture ==
=== Depictions ===
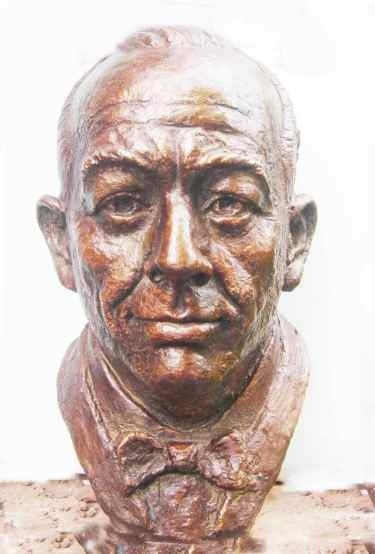
1968 sculpture of Coward

Coward is depicted in several plays. He was played by Guy Henry in the Afternoon Play of 4 May 2007, The Master and Mrs Tucker, by Roy Apps, which told of Coward's friendship with Edith Nesbit (played by Ann Bell). Marvellous Party, a comic play about a middle-age reunion in Las Vegas of Coward and his collaborator Esmé Wynne-Tyson, by her son Jon Wynne-Tyson, was broadcast by the BBC World Service in May 1994, starring Stanley Baxter as Coward and Dorothy Tutin as Wynne-Tyson. Coward is the leading figure in Jeremy Kingston's comedy, Making Dickie Happy, also featuring Agatha Christie and Louis Mountbatten (the 'Dickie' of the title), first staged at the Rosemary Branch Theatre in London in September 2004. Two Old Queens, by John Senczuk, is a musical comic duologue between Coward (or his spirit) and the Queen Mother at the unveiling of the statue of Coward in Poets' Corner. The piece has been touring in Australia since 2007. A play about the friendship between Coward and Marlene Dietrich, called Lunch with Marlene, by Chris Burgess, ran at the New End Theatre in 2008. The second act presents a musical revue, including Coward songs such as "Don't Let's Be Beastly to the Germans".

He is also portrayed in several films and in television and radio shows. He was played by his godson Daniel Massey in the 1969 film Star! and by David Benson as a regular character in the fifth and sixth series of the award-winning BBC sitcom Goodnight Sweetheart. In the episode "Meltdown" of the BBC comedy Red Dwarf, Coward appears as a wax-droid on a theme park planet. In a 1989 TV film about James Bond creator Ian Fleming, Coward was played by Julian Fellowes. Coward is portrayed by Guy Siner in the 1991 episode "Royal Flush" of the BBC comedy You Rang, M'Lord?. Marcy Kahan's Noël Coward quintet for BBC Radio 4 dramatises Coward as a detective in Design For Murder (2000), A Bullet at Balmain's (2003) and Death at the Desert Inn (2004), and as a spy in Blithe Spy (2002) and Our Man in Jamaica (2007). The cast of the quintet includes Malcolm Sinclair as Coward, Eleanor Bron as his secretary and Tam Williams as his assistant, Cole Lesley.

The 2002 Doctor Who novel Mad Dogs and Englishmen features a version of Coward who has allied himself with alien poodles and gained time travel technology. Other characters based on Coward include Beverly Carlton in the 1939 Broadway play The Man Who Came to Dinner. Reginald Gardiner played the same character in the 1942 film of the play). Coward is portrayed by Arty Froushan in the 2025 period film Downton Abbey: The Grand Finale, where his homosexuality is hinted at.

=== Uses and cultural references ===
Uses, homages and parodies of Coward's music and writings include a Monty Python parody, "Penis Song", used in their 1983 movie, The Meaning of Life and in their album Monty Python Sings, sung in the persona of a Noël Coward-style lounge singer. Coward's dialogue style was lampooned in the recurring sketch Fiona and Charles in the radio show Round the Horne. Coward's play Private Lives is parodied in the off-Broadway musical revue Secrets Every Smart Traveler Should Know in a short scene entitled "Private Wives". The 2007 video game BioShock features three of Coward's recordings: "Twentieth Century Blues", "World Weary" and "The Party's Over Now".

The opening to the song "The Lady Is a Tramp" includes the line "Alas, I missed the Beaux Arts Ball, and what is twice as sad I was never at a party where they honored Noël Ca-ad (Coward)". In the Ian Dury song "There Ain't Half Been Some Clever Bastards", the lyrics include: "Noël Coward was a charmer/ As a writer he was brahma /Velvet jackets and pyjamas/ The Gay Divorce and other dramas." In the episode "Back in the Red" of Red Dwarf, Lister refers to Kryten as sounding "like Noël Coward's elocution teacher". In the episode "Spin" of House M.D., Stacy comments on an argument between House and Mark by saying: "My goodness, it's like watching Oscar Wilde and Noël Coward in the third grade." In the (1969) English film Kes, a man inquires about his interest in Coward's autobiography, Present Indicative. The name of the men's clothing line 'Godspeed the Well-Dressed Man' came from the closing of one of Coward's letters.
