= Roger Davenport =

English actor and writer

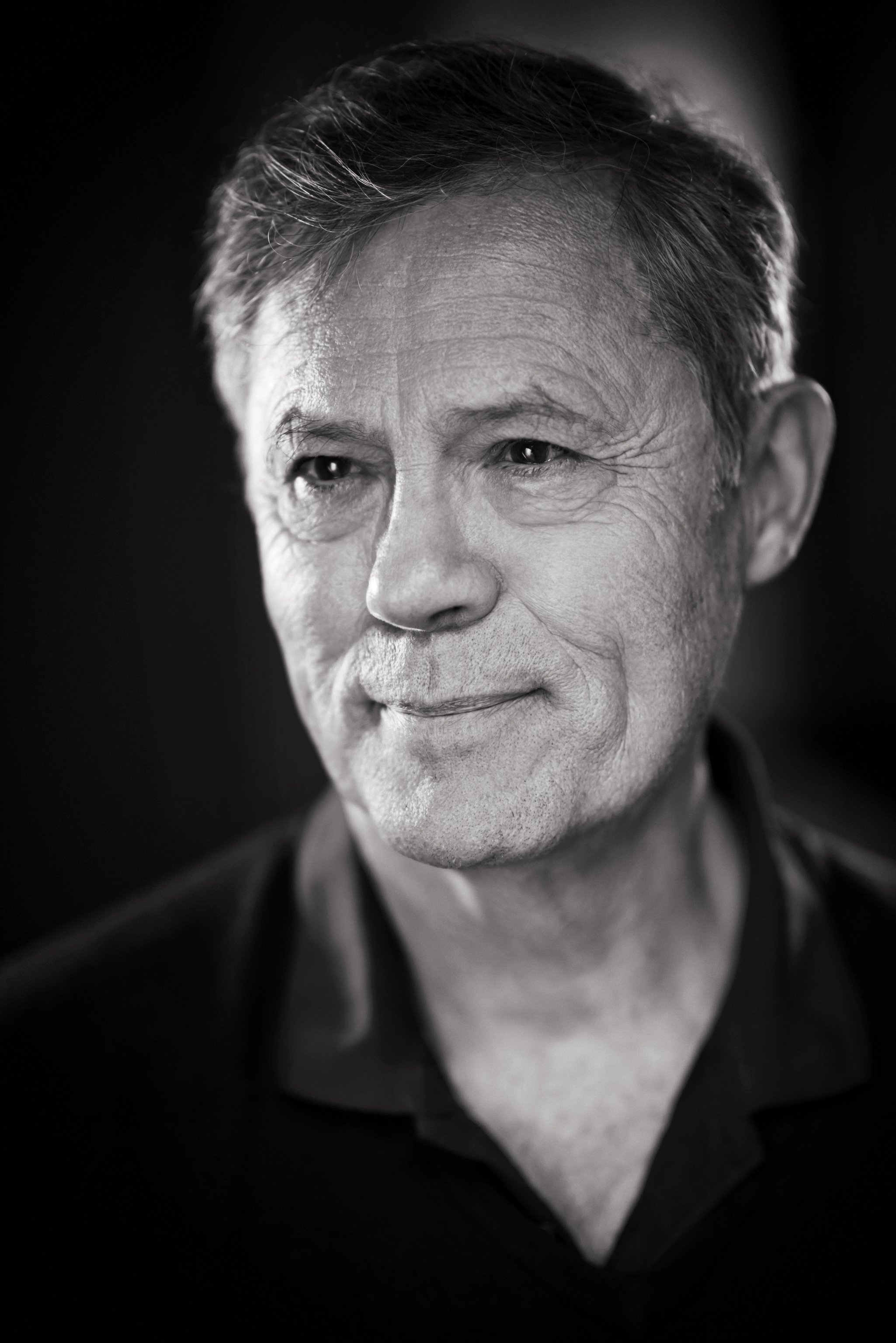
- Roger Davenport in 2015
- Born: 4 October 1946 (age 79); London, England
- Education: LAMDA
- Spouse: Joanna McCallum
- Children: 2
- Parent: John Davenport

Roger Davenport (born 4 October 1946) is an English author, actor and screenwriter. He is the son of John Davenport, who was for many years a literary critic writing for The Observer newspaper. Graduating from LAMDA in 1967, Davenport worked extensively in British theatre before becoming a writer. He is married to the actress Joanna McCallum.

== Acting career ==
Davenport's acting career included work in the West End and on tour in regional theatres, performing in plays and musicals. He was a member of several repertory companies including Bristol, Nottingham, Leicester, Derby and Worcester. He was also a member of George Baker's Company Candida Plays and the Cambridge Theatre Company. He was part of the Lyric Theatre Belfast company from 1971 to 1972. Davenport was King Nicholas in The Sleeping Prince (St Martin's Theatre, 1969), Givola in The Resistible Rise of Arturo Ui (Lyric Theatre Belfast, 1972), and Siro in the musical Mandrake (Criterion Theatre, 1970), based on Machiavelli's Mandragola. On television he played Martin Bagley in Brassneck (BBC, 1974) by David Hare and Howard Brenton, and In 2007 he played Saki (the writer Hector Hugh Munro) in the BBC production The Double Life of Saki. In 2016 he voiced Harbourmaster Van Zandt and other characters in the video game Nelly Cootalot and the Fowl Fleet.

== Writing career ==
In the 1980s Davenport worked in the Unilever advertising agency Lintas, and then as a theatre manager with the Stoll Moss group. Since then, he has dedicated most of his time to writing, focussing on fiction and screenplays, with the occasional foray into documentaries. He wrote for the BBC TV detective series Bergerac, and for series 6 and 7 of All Creatures Great and Small. He also contributed screenplays for the BBC drama documentary series Indelible Evidence (BBC TV, 1986-1990) and wrote for the TV series Growing Pains (BBC TV 1992-93), as well as for The Bill (ITV). In 2007, Davenport wrote the script for The Double Life of Saki, produced and directed by Andrew Hutton for the BBC series The Edwardians: the Birth of Now.

Davenport has written a number of original plays for BBC Radio Drama, as well as adapting works by P.G. Wodehouse and Saki, which were directed by Ned Chaillet. In addition, he has written several Young Adult novels, including the dystopian tale Wanderer, which went into paperback in 2016.

== Books ==
- Wanderer (Skyhorse Publishing, 2013, ISBN 9781620875414, republished 2016, ISBN 9781510703896)
- Ortho's Brood (Scholastic, 2000, ISBN 9780439996372)
- Lowlake (Scholastic, 2000, ISBN 9780439994903)
- Out of His Mind (Bloomsbury, 1996, ISBN 9780747526827)
- Pieces of the Game (Oxford University Press, 1993, ISBN 9780192716972)
- Onlooker (Bodley Head Children's Books, 1989, ISBN 9780370312767, republished by Red Fox, 1990, ISBN 9780099750703)

== Selected Radio Writings ==
- Claw Marks on the Curtains (BBC, 2005)
- More Mr Mulliner (BBC, 2004, dir. Ned Chaillet)
- Meet Mr Mulliner (BBC, 2002, dir. Ned Chaillet)
- Handwoven Underwater (BBC, 1991)
- The Ugly Man (BBC, 1988)
- Just a Few Friends (BBC, 1988)
- Philadelphia Moonshine (BBC, 1985)
- Eddie and Miss Simpson (BBC, 1984)
