= Marcy Kahan =

British playwright and radio dramatist

Marcy Kahan (born 4 July) is a British playwright and radio dramatist, who is half-Canadian and half-American. She is a prolific author of urbane comedies for the BBC. She was born in Montreal, educated at Somerville College, Oxford and trained in theatre in Paris with the Lecoq School teachers, Philippe Gaulier and Monika Pagneux.

== Selected works ==
=== Theatre ===
- 20 Cigarettes National Youth Theatre, Soho Theatre 2007
- Stage version of Nora Ephron's When Harry Met Sally ..., Theatre Royal Haymarket, 2005
- Goldberg Variations, Miranda Theatre, New York, 1999
- Intimate Memoirs of an Irish Taxidermist, Edinburgh and Donmar Theatre, 1986 Perrier Award for Best Comedy

=== Screenplay ===
- Antonia and Jane, BBC/Miramax, Gold Plaque Award for Best Original Screenplay, 1991 Chicago Film Festival

=== Press ===
- Bomb magazine — Michael Frayn by Marcy Kahan (issue 73, fall 2000)

== Radio ==
=== Radio plays ===
- Fusion Confidential BBC Radio 4, 24 October 2020
- Born To Be Wilde: The Warhol Years BBC Radio 4, 17 December 2018
- Ninety Minutes With Stanislavski BBC Radio 3, 10 December 2017
- Five Lessons - Series A Month of Maureen BBC Radio 4, 13 November 2017
- Lunch: A Platonic Romantic Comedy - Series Five BBC Radio 4, 24–28 July 2017
- Lunch: A Platonic Romantic Comedy - Series Four BBC Radio 4, 18–22 July 2016
- Lunch: A Platonic Romantic Comedy - Series Three BBC Radio 4, 11–15 May 2015
- Lunch: A Platonic Romantic Comedy - Series Two BBC Radio 4, 22–26 September 2014 2015 BBC Audio Drama Award for Best Scripted Comedy
- Lunch: A Platonic Romantic Comedy - Series One BBC Radio 4, 15–19 July 2013
- Mr Bridger's Orphan, BBC Radio 4, 15 Mar 2013
- The Porlock Poisoner, BBC World Service, 13 Aug 2011
- Incredibly Guilty, BBC Radio 4, 14 Jan 2011
- Big In Samoa, BBC Radio 4, 1 Jan 2010
- Life Complicated; Status Pending, BBC Radio 4, 7 Oct 2009
- From Fact to Fiction: Artie & Zoe, BBC Radio 4, 4 May 2008
- From Fact to Fiction: The Heebie Jeebies, BBC Radio 4, 20 December 2014
- Nostrovia Fitzrovia: The Black Cat Murder Mystery, BBC World Service, 3 May 2008
- The Playwright & The Grammarian, BBC Radio 4, 2 May 2008
- Marvellous!, BBC World Service, 2007
- The Noël Coward Quintet : Five detective comedies/spy thrillers featuring the British playwright Noël Coward: Design for Murder, 2000; Blithe Spy, 2002; A Bullet at Balmain's, 2003; Death at the Desert Inn, 2004; Our Man in Jamaica, 2007, BBC Radio 4
- 20 Cigarettes, BBC Radio 4, 2006
- Object of Insane Desire, BBC World Service, 2006
- Drop Dead Gorgeous, BBC World Service, Bronze Medal for Best Play, 2004 New York Radio Festival
- The Non-Entity, BBC Radio 4, 2003
- Killing Katerina, BBC World Service, 2001
- The Uncertainty Principle, BBC World Service, 2001 Kurd Lasswitz Science Fiction Prize
- The DJ Who Used To Be A Nun's Tale, BBC Radio 4, 2000
- Victorville, BBC Radio 4, 1998
- Salzburg in London, BBC World Service, 1997
- Everybody Comes to Schicklgruber's, BBC Radio 4, 1997 Silver Sony Award
- Purgatory, BBC Radio 3, 1991
- The Transmogrification of Herbert Mellish, BBC Radio 4 1987
- Viva, BBC Radio 4, 1986
- One Last Final Fling, BBC Radio 4, 1985
- The Contemplative Life, BBC Radio 3, 1985

She was one of the writers of BBC Radio 4's soap opera Citizens.

=== Radio dramatisations ===
- Underfoot in Show Business by Helene Hanff, BBC Radio 4, 18 May 2025
- A Room With A View by E.M. Forster, BBC Radio 4, 21 and 28 May 2023
- Madam, Will You Talk? by Mary Stewart, BBC Radio 4, 23 and 30 August 2020
- Kitchen Confidential by Anthony Bourdain, BBC Radio 4, a 5-episode dramatisation, 22–26 May 2017
- Look Who's Back? from the novel by Timur Vermes BBC Radio 4 27 September, 4 October 2015
- The Corrections by Jonathan Franzen, BBC Radio 4, a 15-episode dramatisation, 5–23 January 2015*
- Psmith in the City by P.G. Wodehouse, BBC Radio 4, 2008
- Adventures of Huckleberry Finn, CBC/BBC co-production, 2002
- The Man Who Came to Dinner by Moss Hart and George S Kaufman, BBC Radio 4, 25 December 2000
- War & Peace (co-author: Mike Walker). Talkie Award for Best Drama, 1998
- The Wizard of Oz , BBC Radio 4
- The Railway Children, BBC Radio 4
- Anne of Green Gables, BBC Radio 4
- Little Women & Good Wives, BBC Radio 4, 1992–3

== Sources ==
- Stephen Mangan & Marcy Kahan interview
- Radio 4's Lunch was a wise and witty feast for the senses
- Who will be the first woman on the moon?
