= Arthur Crook =

- Born: 16 February 1912
- Died: 15 July 2005 (aged 93)
- Occupation: Newspaper editor
- Known for: Editor of the Times Literary Supplement (1959–74)

Arthur Charles William Crook (16 February 1912 – 15 July 2005) was an English writer and former editor of the Times Literary Supplement.

Crook was educated at Holloway County Grammar School and did not attend university. He began his career in newspapers as a messenger boy on The Times. He crossed from The Times to become a clerk on the Supplement in 1930 and quickly became a contributor to the "Books to Come" section.

== Personal life ==
Crook enjoyed travelling, even in his later years. He was a member of the Garrick Club.
