= Andrew Dallmeyer =

Scottish playwright, theatre director and actor

- Born: 10 January 1945; St Boswells, Eildon Hills, Scotland
- Died: 21 May 2017 (aged 72)
- Education: Webber Douglas School of Singing and Dramatic Art, London
- Occupations: Actor, director, playwright
- Writing career
- Notable works: Opium Eater, Hello Dali, Wanted:Dead or Alive, Boys In The Backroom
- Website: andrewdallmeyer.co.uk

Andrew Dallmeyer (10 January 1945 – 21 May 2017) was a Scottish playwright, theatre director and actor. He wrote over 75 plays, including the Opium Eater and directed more than 50 productions. His plays have won a number of awards, including a Scottish BAFTA, and they have been played on BBC Radio.

Some of Dallmeyer's plays have been considered controversial, for example Wanted: Dead or Alive which focused on Osama bin Laden's motives and was released on the first anniversary of the September 11 attacks. Some of his other plays celebrate the life and works of historical figures such as John Muir and Salvador Dalí. As an actor, Dallmeyer had a recurring role in Scottish cult comedy, Rab C. Nesbitt.

== Early life ==
Dallmeyer was born on 10 January 1945 in St Boswells in Roxburghshire, Scotland. He spent most of his childhood in Aberlady, East Lothian where he was a keen Hibernian F.C. supporter (later inspiring his interest to write Playing a Blinder). Dallmeyer learnt drama at the Webber Douglas School of Singing and Dramatic Art, London. His father served in the British Army during the Second World War and was twice awarded the Distinguished Service Order.

== Career ==
"Sometimes people tell me I'll be successful when I'm dead, but I believe if you write something worthwhile it will survive. But writing is something I've always done because I have to get something out there."

— Andrew Dallmeyer in Herald Scotland (2010)

Dallmeyer, described as a veteran actor and playwright, began his theatre work in the 1960s as an actor in Bristol Old Vic and Nottingham Playhouse performances. At the age of 26 he was the artistic director at Liverpool Playhouse, although he didn't enjoy it and instead wanted to focus on writing his own plays. He subsequently directed many productions at the Traverse Theatre in Edinburgh, Sheffield Crucible, Dundee Rep, Leeds Playhouse and several more.

As a playwright, Dallmeyer has written over 75 plays despite admitting he is unable to type and has directed over 50 productions. He was commissioned by the Baron of Prestongrange and has written a number of plays for him. He won three Fringe First awards as well as a BAFTA Scotland Award for the Best Radio Play of 1985 in Scotland. In 1982, The Times pointed out that he was able to put on three separate successful Fringe shows each year. Much of Dallmeyer's work has not been published or put into print and therefore he holds the only copy of many plays.

=== 1980s ===
The Opium Eater, based on Confessions of an English Opium-Eater by Thomas De Quincey, has had more than a dozen performances across the United Kingdom. The play was published by Capercaillie Books, made into a television production (featuring Peter Mullan) and a radio version directed by Stewart Conn. The radio play won a BAFTA award equivalent in 1985. Dallmeyer believes The Opium Eater is somewhat autobiographical in nature as it is about a writer trying to find inspiration. He went on to state that "I don't think I'm that neurotic. I'm quite steady, really, mentally. You have to be in this job." Martin Cropper reviewed the show in The Times as one of the best he had seen at a fringe theatre. The Opium Eater won awards and was adapted for radio.

The Boys in the Backroom was part of a series of plays, produced by Salamander Press, called The Traverse Plays. The plays were written in celebration of Scottish playwrights and Dallmeyer's play was fifth in the series. The play was performed in theatres across America covering 10 cities including New York, Los Angeles, San Francisco and Pittsburgh. It was reviewed in The Times as a conspiracy story which "markets its paranoia through outsize performances". Following a performance in Los Angeles in 1987 it reviewed by the Los Angeles Times as "sophomoric and forgettable." It has also been performed by students at the Royal Conservatoire of Scotland.

His one-man show, titled Hello Dali, based on artist Salvador Dalí won a Fringe First award and has previously starred Sylvester McCoy and Neil Cunningham. It has been performed in many countries including: Scotland, England, United States, Belgium, Spain, France, and the Netherlands. The play was described as a "scatological, emotional and artistic biography".

In 1986, Dallmeyer wrote The Grand Edinburgh Fire Balloon as a piece of commissioned work for the Royal Lyceum Theatre. Based on the story of the first man to fly in Britain; James Tytler was a pioneer with the development of the hot air balloon. Despite the Lyceum being praised for commissioning a new play with regional importance the play itself received some poor feedback. The Times reporter Sarah Hemmings viewed the play to be "rather monotonous" and "static", though she also said that the "Scenes that do take off are fascinating." John Peter of the Sunday Times reported that the acting was below standard.

=== 2000s ===
Dallmeyer wrote and performed in his controversial 50-minute one-man play, Wanted Dead or Alive, in which Osama bin Laden is Santa Claus in a shopping mall. It was released on the first September 11th attacks anniversary and attempts to explain possible reasons for Osama bin Laden's anger towards America. The performance prompted complaints from the US consulate and Dallmeyer received death threats and abusive phone calls. There were calls from Scottish Parliament member, Brian Monteith, to boycott the performance. Dallmeyer defended the play, stating "I am not trying to create a sensation; it is just that I feel the piece is strong". The play featured "strongly anti-American sentiments and condemns United States foreign policy" and despite the backlash Dallmeyer has performed it over 100 times.

His stage play, Playing a Blinder, which attempted to re-create the 1940 Edinburgh Derby's New Year's Day match, in which the commentator improvised what was happening on the pitch due to severe fog, was aired in 2002 on BBC Radio 4. The cast included Andy Gray and Gavin Mitchell. The play took Dallmeyer two years to create and due to their being no recordings of the event he had to "imagine how it might have sounded".

Dallmeyer wrote the musical Burns Supper, in collaboration with composer David Todd, inspired by the bard Robert Burns. They then donated the script to schools around the country and a competition was held, in conjunction with charity 'First Scottish Film Features', to find the best school performance. Some of the work was then presented at the Fringe festival.

=== 2010s ===
Dallmeyer wrote the play Thank God for John Muir based on the life of John Muir and specifically based on the period in Muir's life when an industrial accident left him blind. It was reviewed in 2011 as an "emotional and sensory journey", yet Alan Chadwick, from The Herald, described it as "too static" and the ending was "underwhelming". The play was scheduled to be a part of the 2015 John Muir celebrations in East Lothian.

== Plays written by Dallmeyer ==
"True theatre cannot be institutionalized. It is rough, outlaw, dangerous, rabid, and might just bite. Like the Fringe. It sprawls uncontrollably. It needs a trim."

— Andrew Dallmeyer in Fringe and Fortune: The Role of Critics in High and Popular Art (1996)

Title	Year	Broadcaster	Notes	References
Brainwaves	1973			
A Big Treatise in Store	1979			
Metaphysics and Strip	1981			
Opium Eater	1984; 1985; 1993	BBC Radio 3 BBC Radio 3 BBC Two England		
Boys in the Backroom	1983		Part of the Salamander Press The Traverse Plays series	
Hello Dali	1984			
The Grand Edinburgh Fire Balloon	1986	Royal Lyceum Theatre		
A Grand Scam	1989			
Rudolf Hess Glasgow to Glasnost	1990			
Virtual Radio	1994	BBC Radio 4		
Fatwah Patois	1995	Tron Theatre		
Potted History	1996	BBC Radio 4		
The Chic Murray Story	1997			
Into the Ether	2000	BBC Radio 4		
Wanted:Dead or Alive	2002			
Playing a Blinder	2002	BBC Radio 4		
The Ordeal of Alfred M Hale	2003	BBC Radio 4		
Burns Supper	2007			
The Battle of Pots and Pans	2008			
Colonel Gardiner: Vice and Virtue	2009			
Too Clever By Half	2009			
Thank God for John Muir	2011			
The Mother of All Burns	2014	Scottish Storytelling Centre		

== Plays directed by Dallmeyer ==
Title	Year	Broadcaster	Notes	References
Miss Julie	2012	Vagabond Productions		

== Acting roles ==
Title	Year	Broadcaster	Notes	References
The Watchers on the Shore	1971	BBC Radio 4		
Old Alliances	1986	BBC Radio 4		
Tartuffe	1986	Royal Lyceum Theatre		
Foreigners	1987	BBC Radio 4		
City Lights	1988	BBC Two England		
A Man Flourishing	1988	BBC Radio 4		
Shadow on the Earth	1988	BBC Two England		
The Tales of Para Handy	1994	BBC One London		
Bad Boys	1996	BBC One London		
The Secret Commonwealth	1996	BBC Radio 3		
Rab C Nesbitt	1993; 1997; 1998; 2011	BBC Two		
Waiting for Godot	2003	The Arches (Glasgow)		
Krapp's Last Tape	2005	The Arches (Glasgow)	As part of The Basement Tapes	
Stonehurst Asylum (Eliza Graves)	2014			
