= Elizabeth Mansfield =

American novelist (1925–2003)

Paula Schwartz (1925-2003) was an American playwright and novelist. Schwartz was the author of 36 Regency romance novels under the pen name Elizabeth Mansfield and of mainstream fiction under the name Paula Reibel, Paula Jonas, and Paula Reid.

Schwartz was born in the Bronx, a borough of New York City. She obtained an undergraduate degree from Hunter College and earned her M.A. in English from the City University of New York.

Schwartz taught drama and English in New York and later moved to Washington, D.C. in 1965, where she taught English at Dunbarton College of Holy Cross, a women's college. She began to write novels when the college closed in 1973, and eventually moved to Annandale, Virginia.

Schwartz's musical, An Accident At Lyme, an adaptation of Jane Austen's novel Persuasion, was staged in Baltimore in 1986 by Theatre Hopkins.

== Books ==
=== As Paula Reibel ===
- A Morning Moon; a Jewish family saga spanning the years from 1895 to 1933. (1984, Morrow, ISBN 978-1-954434-00-4)

=== As Elizabeth Mansfield ===
Title	Year of first publication	ISBN
Accidental Romance, The reissued as Whistledown's Shrew	1988, Reissue 2023	978-1-954434-01-1
Bartered Bride, The		0-515-08916-8
Brilliant Mismatch, A	1991, Reissue 2021	ISBN 978-1-954434-03-5
Christmas Kiss, The		ISBN 0-515-08916-8
Counterfeit Husband, The		0-515-09010-7
Duel of Hearts		0-515-08846-3
Fifth Kiss, The		ISBN 0-515-08910-9
Frost Fair, The		ISBN 0-515-08961-3
Grand Deception, A		0-441-30172-X
Grand Passion, The		0-515-08697-5
Her Heart's Captain		ISBN 0-515-08916-8
Her Man of Affairs		0-515-08799-8
Lady Disguised, The		0-896-21972-0
Love Lessons	1998	0-515-09210-X
Magnificent Masquerade, The		0-515-11460-X
Marriage of Invonvenience, A		0-515-09219-3
Matched Pairs		0-515-11785-4
Miscalculations	2000	0-515-12834-1
Mother's Choice		0-515-11386-7
My Lord Murderer		0-515-08743-2
Passing Fancies		0-515-09175-8
Phantom Lover, The		0-515-08742-4
Poor Caroline		0-515-11659-9
Prior Engagement, A		0-515-10398-5
Regency Charade, A		0-515-08916-8
Regency Holiday, A		0-515-10705-0
Regency Match		0-515-08756-4
Regency Sting		0-515-08773-4
Reluctant Flirt		0-515-08937-0
Splendid Indiscretion, A		0-515-09263-0
Very Dutiful Daughter, A		9-995-61186-4
Winter Wonderland		0-515-11234-8

=== As Paula Reid ===
- Rachel's Passage; An historical novel set in America at the turn of the 19th century, exploring marital abandonment, marriage, and "criminal conversation" (1998 ISBN 0-06-101362-5)

=== As Paula Jonas ===
- To Spite the Devil; An historical novel set in Revolutionary America, in what is now currently one of the boroughs of New York City. (1994 ISBN 0-7860-0030-9). This novel is based on the musical The Tory Spinster, by Paula Schwartz and Neil Moyer (1975).

== Plays and musicals ==
=== Musicals ===
Schwartz collaborated with composers Neil Moyer and Howard Levetsky on several musical projects.

- The Tory Spinster, (with Neil Moyer) a musical set in Revolutionary America, won the Delaware Bicentennial Playwriting Contest, sponsored by the Delaware Theatre Association, and was performed in April and May 1975.
- An Accident At Lyme, (with Neil Moyer), a musical adaptation of Jane Austen's Persuasion

=== Plays ===
- Parcel Pickup, a one-act play published in Dramatics Magazine, 1973
