= Steve Hodson =

British actor (1947–2025)

- Born: Stephen Leslie Hodson; 5 November 1947; Bradford, West Riding of Yorkshire, England
- Died: 16 February 2025 (aged 77)
- Occupation: Actor

Stephen Leslie Hodson (5 November 1947 – 16 February 2025) was a British actor who played the role of Steve Ross in Follyfoot.

== Life and career ==
Hodson was born in Bradford, West Riding of Yorkshire on 5 November 1947. He was working as a civil servant in Bradford when he won a place at the Central School of Speech and Drama in London. From then-on he began appearing in roles on stage and later in television, appearing in The Grievance and The Rivals of Sherlock Holmes. In 1971, he auditioned for role of Steve in Follyfoot, but was initially unsuccessful. Another actor was employed, but later dismissed and Hodson was recruited to the part. He appeared in all three series of its run, from 1971 to 1973. During this period, there was a Steve Hodson fan club. In January 1973, he released a single called "Crystal Bay", written by Maurice Gibb and Billy Lawrie.

Hodson appeared in a number of television series over the next few years, including All Creatures Great and Small and a six-episode children's series, Break in the Sun. Hodson also appeared on Crimewatch UK in 1985 as a bank robber in a reconstruction of a theft, after which a number of people reported him to be the robber. Hodson continued to act and worked regularly as a voice artist on radio and for audio books, including work with Christian Rodska, his co-star in Follyfoot. Hodson married his wife, Rosamund, soon after finishing in Follyfoot, and they had two daughters.

== Death ==
Hodson died on 16 February 2025, at the age of 77.
