= John Rogan (actor) =

Irish actor (1938–2017)

- Rogan, pictured in 2012
- Born: 24 July 1937; Waterford, County Waterford, Ireland
- Died: 19 March 2017 (aged 79); London, United Kingdom
- Occupation: Actor
- Years active: 1971–2017

John Rogan (1938 – 19 March 2017) was an Irish actor.

His career began in theatre, appearing in productions ranging from Shakespearean plays to musicals and contemporary drama, and he then moved into film and TV work.

He was a cousin of author and music critic Johnny Rogan.

He appeared in the West End in Into the Woods playing the Mysterious Man/Cinderella's Father.

== Filmography ==
Year	Title	Role	Notes
1971	Boswell's Life of Johnson	Performer	TV film
1979	Scum	Escort	
1981	Dangerous Davies: The Last Detective	Father Harvey	TV film
1986	Caravaggio	Vatican Official	
1986	Foreign Body	Lodging house man #1	
1986	The Little Match Girl	Pie Seller	TV film
1988	The Dawning	Mr. Carroll	
1988	Drowning by Numbers	Gregory	
1991	Screen Two	Gerry	Episode: "The Grass Arena"
1998	Father Ted	Mr. Fox	Episode: "Speed 3"
2001–2002	Weirdsister College	Professor J. Shakeshaft	8 episodes
2002	Close Your Eyes	Francis Paladine	
2003	Intermission	Alfred	
