= Bradley Lavelle =

Canadian actor

Brad Lavelle
- Born: Bradley Cresswell Lavelle; 31 March 1958; Toronto, Ontario, Canada
- Died: 22 March 2007 (aged 48); London, England
- Occupation: actor

Bradley Lavelle (31 March 1958 – 22 March 2007) was a British-based Canadian actor.

Born in Toronto, Ontario, Lavelle appeared in such films as Hellbound: Hellraiser II, Nightbreed and Memphis Belle.

He played a young American, Charlie Dameron, in the TV series Heartbeat, on 28 November 1993. He died in 2007.

== Video Game ==
- 1995 Flight of the Amazon Queen as Joe King / Commander Rocket Characters (voice)
- 1996 Z as Brad / Zod (voice)
- 1997 G-Police as (voice)
- 1999 Urban Chaos as (voice)
- 1999 Driver: You Are The Wheelman as John Tanner (voice)
- 2001 Original War as (voice)
- 2002 Big Mutha Truckers as (voice)
- 2001 Gothic as various (voice)
- 2002 Gothic 2 as The Nameless Hero (voice)
- 2003 Battle Engine Aquila as (voice)
- 2004 Malice: A Kat's Tale as (voice)
- 2005 X3: Reunion as (voice)
- 2005 Perfect Dark Zero as (voice)

== Radio ==
- 1991-1993 Mission Investigates
- 1991 Design for Living
- 1994 Waiting for Lefty
- 2004 Children of the Corn

== Filmography ==
- 1983 Invitation to the Wedding as Burke
- 1984 Supergirl as Lucy's Friend
- 1985 Displaced Person (TV)
- 1985 What Mad Pursuit? (TV) as Tim Murphy
- 1986 The Last Days of Patton (TV)
- 1987 Going Home
- 1987 Superman IV: The Quest for Peace as Tall Marshall
- 1988 Makaitoshi Shinjuki (as Brad Lavelle) as Kyoya (English version, voice)
- 1988 Hellbound: Hellraiser II as Officer Kucich
- 1988 The Dressmaker as Party Guest
- 1989 Worlds of Love (TV)
- 1989 Tailspin: Behind the Korean Airliner Tragedy (TV) as Jamie
- 1989 Vagen hem (TV) as Nick
- 1990 Nightbreed as Cormack
- 1990 Memphis Belle as Sergeant
- 1991 Screen One (TV) as American Doctor
- 1992 Waterland as Guest At Dinner Party
- 1993 Jubei ninpucho as (voice: English version; as Brad Lavelle)
- 1995 Judge Dredd as Chief Judge Hunter
- 1998 Fallen Angels as (voice)
- 1998 Razor Blade Smile (as Brad Lavelle) as The Chill Pilgrim
- 2005 My Tumour & I as The Tumour
- 2006 Alien Autopsy as New York Host

== Theatre ==
- 1994 Captain Kirk in Star Trek- The lost voyage of the Enterprise Churchill Theatre, Bromley, UK

== Self ==
- 1987 Omnibus (1 episode)
- 1987 George Grosz: Enemy of the State (TV episode)
