= The Times Literary Supplement =

Fortnightly literary review published in London

- Cover of The Times Literary Supplement, 5 November 2025
- Editor: Martin Ivens
- Categories: Literature, current affairs
- Frequency: 26 per year
- Publisher: News UK
- Founded: 1902; 124 years ago
- Country: United Kingdom
- Based in: London
- Language: English
- Website: www.the-tls.com
- ISSN: 0307-661X

The Times Literary Supplement (TLS) is a fortnightly literary review published in London by News UK, a subsidiary of News Corp.

== History ==
The TLS first appeared in 1902 as a supplement to The Times but became a separate publication in 1914. Reviews were normally anonymous until 1974, when signed reviews were gradually introduced during the editorship of John Gross, who "personally felt that reviewers ought to take responsibility for their opinions."

Martin Amis was a member of the editorial staff early in his career.

Its editorial offices are based in The News Building, London. It is edited by Martin Ivens, who succeeded Stig Abell in June 2020. It was published weekly until August 2025, when it moved to a fortnightly schedule.

Many writers have described the publication as indispensable. Mario Vargas Llosa, novelist and the 2010 winner of the Nobel Prize in Literature, described the TLS as "the most serious, authoritative, witty, diverse and stimulating cultural publication in all the five languages I speak".

== Notable contributors ==
Many distinguished writers have contributed, including T. S. Eliot, Henry James and Virginia Woolf. Philip Larkin's poem "Aubade", his final poetic work, was first published in the Christmas-week issue of the TLS in 1977. While it has long been regarded as one of the world's pre-eminent critical publications, its history is not without gaffes: it missed James Joyce entirely, and commented only negatively on Lucian Freud from 1945 until 1978, when a portrait of his appeared on the cover.

The TLS has included essays, reviews and poems by D. M. Thomas, John Ashbery, Italo Calvino, Patricia Highsmith, Milan Kundera, Philip Larkin, Mario Vargas Llosa, Joseph Brodsky, Gore Vidal, Orhan Pamuk, Geoffrey Hill and Seamus Heaney, among others.

== Editors ==
- 1902: James Thursfield
- 1902: Bruce Richmond
- 1938: D. L. Murray (David Leslie Murray)
- 1945: Stanley Morison
- 1948: Alan Payan Pryce-Jones
- 1959: Arthur Crook
- 1974: John Gross
- 1981: Jeremy Treglown
- 1991: Ferdinand Mount
- 2003: Peter Stothard
- 2016: Stig Abell
- 2020: Martin Ivens

== See also ==
- The New York Review of Books
- London Review of Books
- List of literary magazines
