= Marty Rea =

Northern Irish actor

Marty Rea is an actor from Belfast, Northern Ireland.

== Early life ==
Rea was born and reared in Craigavon, Co. Armagh but spent his teenage years in West Belfast where he attended St Mary's Christian Brothers' Grammar School, Belfast. He then won a Lady Rothermere Scholarship to the Royal Academy of Dramatic Art (RADA) in London.

== Career ==
He has performed in a lengthy list of both television, film and theatre productions.

=== Television and Film ===
- Secret Peacemaker - Fr Alec Reid (RTE & BBCNI) Garry Keane
- Stray - Priest (Arcade Films) Sinead O’Loughlin
- Prisoners of the Moon - Jean Michael (Bandit Films) Johnny Gogan
- Citizen Lane - Orpen (Citizen Lane DAC) Thaddeus O’Sullivan
- Barbarians Rising - Lucipinus (History Channel) Maurice Sweeney
- The Devil's Pool - Man (Vico Films) Cecily Brennan
- The Man Inside (Short) - Lisandro (Broken Pictures Limited) Rory Bresnihan
- Curran Reconstruction Case -John Steele (BBC Television) Philip Cassin
- Vingt Minutes - Michael Fairlough (Case Television) Lois Espana

=== Theatre ===
- Circle Mirror Transformation - Schultz (Gate Theatre) Róisín McBrinn
- The Shadow of a Gunman - Donal Davoren (Druid Theatre Company) Garry Hynes
- The Plough and the Stars – DruidO’Casey - The Young Covey (Druid Theatre) Garry Hynes
- The Shadow of a Gunman – DruidO’Casey - Donal Davoren (Druid Theatre) Garry Hynes
- Juno and the Paycock – DruidO’Casey - Needle Nugent & Irregular #2 (Druid Theatre) Garry Hynes
- The New Electric Ballroom - Patsy (Gate Theatre) Emma Jordan
- The Weir - Jim (Abbey Theatre) Caitríona McLaughlin
- Translations - Manus (Abbey Theatre) Caitríona McLaughlin
- Portia Coughlan - Raphael (Abbey Theatre) Caroline Byrne
- Three Short Comedies - Barry Derrill & Doctor (Druid Theatre) Garry Hynes
- The Seagull - Aston (Druid Theatre) Garry Hynes
- Happy Days - Willie (Landmark Productions) Caitríona McLaughlin
- 14 Voices from the Bloodied Field - Michael Feery (Abbey Theatre in partnership with G.A.A) Eoghan Carrick
- DruidGregory - Play as cast (Druid Theatre) Garry Hynes
- Martyrs (Tiny Plays 24/7) - Alan (Fishamble Theatre) Jim Culleton
- An Unreliable Ex-lover Suddenly Writes (Dear Ireland) - Marty (Abbey Theatre) Nancy Harris
- The Cherry Orchard - Petya (Druid Theatre) Garry Hynes
- The Beacon - Colm (Druid Theatre) Garry Hynes
- Epiphany - Kelly (Druid Theatre) Garry Hynes
- The Glass Menagerie - Tom Wingfield (Gate Theatre) Tom Cairns
- Beginning - Danny (Gate Theatre) Marc Atkinson
- Richard III - Clarence/Catesby (Druid Theatre) Garry Hynes
- Waiting For Godot - Vladimir (Druid Theatre) Garry Hynes
- King of the Castle - Jemmy Maguire (Druid Theatre) Garry Hynes
- The Great Gatsby - Nick Carraway (Gate Theatre) Alexander Wright
- Beauty Queen of Leenane - Pat Dooley (Druid Theatre) Garry Hynes
- Waiting for Godot - Vladimir (Druid Theatre) Garry Hynes
- Othello - Iago (Abbey Theatre) Joe Dowling
- Juno and the Paycock - Joxer Daly (Gate Theatre) Mark O’Rowe
- The Importance of Being Earnest - John Worthing (Gate Theatre) Patrick Mason
- DruidShakespeare - Richard (Druid Theatre) Garry Hynes
- The Caretaker - Aston (Gate Theatre) Toby Frow
- She Stoops to Conquer - Young Marlow (Abbey Theatre) Conall Morrison
- Brigit - Fr. Kilgarriff (Druid Theatre) Garry Hynes
- Be Infants In Evil - Priest (Druid Theatre) Oonagh Murphy
- An Ideal Husband - Lord Goring (Gate Theatre) Ethan McSweeny
- The Colleen Bawn - Hardress Creegan (Druid Theatre) Garry Hynes
- The Hanging Gardens - Maurice Grant (Abbey Theatre) Patrick Mason
- Major Barbara Adolphus Cusins (Abbey Theatre) Annabelle Comyn
- Conversations on a Homecoming - Michael (Druid Theatre) Garry Hynes
- Whistle in the Dark - Michael (Druid Theatre) Garry Hynes
- My Cousin Rachel - Philip Ashley (Gate Theatre) Toby Frow
- Famine - Fr. Horan (Druid Theatre) Garry Hynes
- Whistle in the Dark - Michael (Druid Theatre) Garry Hynes
- Conversations on a Homecoming - Michael (Druid Theatre) Garry Hynes
- Little Women - Laurie (Gate Theatre) Michael Barker-Caven
- Hayfever - Simon Bliss (Gate Theatre) Patrick Mason
- John Gabriel Borkman - Erhart Borkman (Abbey Theatre) James MacDonald
- Arcadia - Septimus Hodge (Gate Theatre) Patrick Mason
- Hamlet - Hamlet (Second Age Theatre) Alan Stanford
- Observe the Sons of Ulster Marching Towards the Somme - The Young Piper (Livin Dred Theatre) Padraic McIntyre
- The Rivals - Faulkland (Abbey Theatre) Patrick Mason
- Only an Apple - Arkins (Abbey Theatre) Selina Cartmell
- Improbable Frequency - Erwin Schroedinger / The Colonel and other roles (Rough Magic) (E59 St Theatre, New York) Lynne Parker
- The Golden Apple - Various (The Ark) Andrea Ainsworth
- An Ideal Husband - Vicomte De Nanjac (Abbey Theatre) Neil Bartlett
- Pentecost Spokesong - Peter Trick Cyclist (Rough Magic & Lyric Theatre) Lynne Parker
- The Glass Menagerie - The Gentleman Caller (Gate Theatre) Robin Lefevre
- Philadelphia Here I Come - Gar Private (Second Age Theatre) Alan Stanford
- The Big House - Vandaleur (Abbey Theatre) Conall Morrison
- Saved - Mike (Peacock Theatre) Jimmy Fay
- Salomé - The Young Syrian (Gate Theatre) Alan Stanford
- Aladdin - Aladdin (Waterfront – Belfast) Simon Magill
- The Importance of Being Earnest - Cecily Cargew (Abbey Theatre) Conall Morrison
- Jack and the Beanstalk - Jack (Waterfront Hall) Simon Magill
- Smilin’ Through - Kyle Morrow (Truant Theatre) Natalie Wilson
- The Session - John James Doherty (Dubbeljoint Theatre) Pam Brighton
- Henry IV - Henry IV (RADA Enterprises) Ellis Jones
- Philadelphia Here I Come - Gar Private (ART NI) Adrian Dunbar
- Gabriel/Donkey The Nativity (Riverside Theatre) Andrea Montgomery
- Little Miss Muffet - Spiro (Centre Stage Theatre) Roma Tomelty
- Lonely Baby - Derek (North Face Theatre) Colin Carnegie
- Goldilocks and the Three Bears - Prince Joringle (Centre Stage Theatre) Colin Carnegie
- Married Bliss _ Archie (Centre Stage Theatre) Colin Carnegie
- The Snow Queen - Raven (Centre Stage Theatre) Roma Tomelty
- Marat/Sade - Kokol (Lyric Theatre) David Grant

== Awards ==
- 2022 - Best Supporting actor nomination for Portia Coughlan - Irish Times Theatre Awards
- 2019 - Outstanding Performer nomination (Visiting Production), ‘Waiting for Godot’ (Druid Theatre Company), Helen Hayes Awards
- 2018 - Best Supporting Actor for ‘The Great Gatsby’ and ‘King of the Castle’ – Irish Times Theatre Awards
- 2017 - Best Actor nomination for ‘Waiting For Godot’ (Druid Theatre Co.) and ‘Othello'(Abbey Theatre), Irish Times Theatre Awards
- 2016 - Best Actor award for ‘Richard 11 (DruidShakespeare)’-Irish Times Theatre Awards
- 2013 - Best Actor nomination for ‘Whistle in the Dark’ – Irish Times Theatre Awards
- 2011 - Best Actor award for ‘Hamlet’ – Irish Times Theatre Awards
