= Joanna McCallum =

English film actress

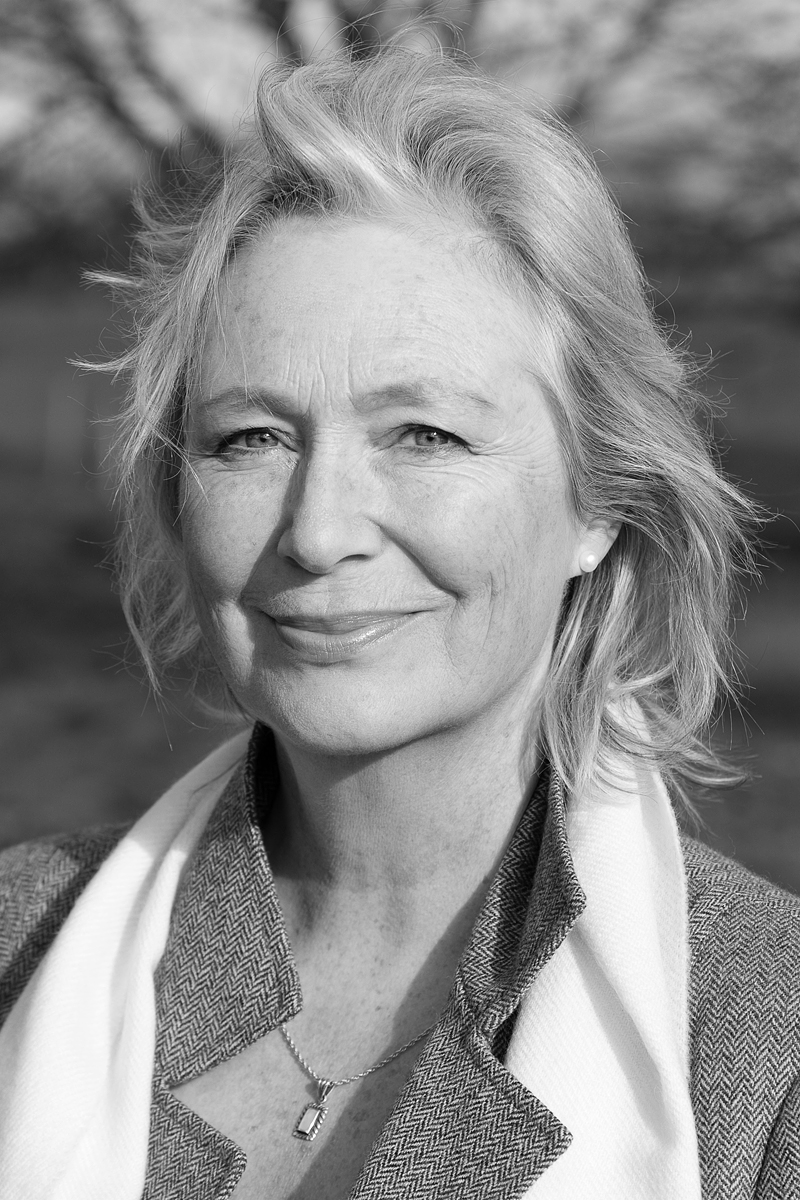
- McCallum in 2009
- Born: 27 June 1950 (age 76); London, England
- Education: National Institute of Dramatic Art (NIDA)
- Spouse: Roger Davenport
- Children: 2
- Parent(s): Googie Withers, John McCallum

Joanna McCallum (born 27 June 1950) is an English theatre, film and television actress.

== Early years and personal life ==
McCallum is the daughter of English actress Googie Withers and Australian actor John McCallum, and was born in London. She was educated at St Catherine's School in Melbourne. McCallum graduated from the National Institute of Dramatic Art (NIDA) in 1969. She is married to writer Roger Davenport.

== Theatre ==
McCallum is best known for her extensive work in theatre. Notable roles include Portia in The Merchant of Venice, with Alec Guinness as Shylock (Chichester Festival Theatre, dir. Patrick Garland, 1984); heading a vast cast as Jane Marryot in Noël Coward's Cavalcade (Chichester Festival Theatre, dir. David Gilmore, 1985); and Margeurite Blakeney, opposite Donald Sinden as Sir Percy Blakeney, in The Scarlet Pimpernel (Her Majesty's Theatre, dir. Nicholas Hytner, 1985). She was Meg Page, one of The Merry Wives of Windsor, with Susannah York as Alice Ford (Royal Shakespeare Company, dir. Ian Judge, 1997); and Gertrude, alongside Mark Rylance as Hamlet, at the reconstructed Globe Theatre on London's South Bank (dir. Giles Block, 2000). McCallum played Princess Dragomiroff in the 2022 production of Agatha Christie's Murder on the Orient Express (Chichester Festival Theatre, dir. Jonathan Church).

== Film and television ==
McCallum played the central character, Aroon, in a three part adaptation of Molly Keane's Anglo Irish novel Good Behaviour (BBC Television, dir. Bill Hays, 1983), and co-starred with Trevor Eve in A Wreath of Roses, adapted from the book by Elizabeth Taylor (Granada Television, dir. John Madden, 1987).

In The Franchise Affair, a 1988 BBC Television serial, she played Marion Sharpe opposite Rosalie Crutchley and Patrick Malahide. She was writer Winifred Holtby in the last episode of Testament of Youth (BBC Television, 1979) and Virginia Woolf in the film Tom & Viv (1994).

McCallum played the missionary Alicia Bassett-Hill in the 1989 TV serial The Ginger Tree, which was based on the novel of the same name by Oswald Wynd; it also starred Samantha Bond and Daisuke Ryu.

Her other television appearances have included episodes of Holby City, All Creatures Great and Small, and Agatha Christie's Poirot.

== Other activities ==
Joanna McCallum is a Vice President of The Theatrical Guild, (formerly The Theatrical Ladies Guild) having been Chairman and has worked with the charity for many years. She is also a Vice President of Acting For Others and is active in fundraising work within the theatre community.

== Selected film and television credits ==
- Doctors, Bleeding Hearts - Margaret Wooley (BBC, 2013)
- Law and Order: UK, Paradise - Judge Hartop (ITV, 2009)
- Holby City, Loss of Faith – Val Hubbard (BBC, 2003)
- The Gathering Storm – Marjorie (HBO, 2002)
- Tom & Viv – Virginia Woolf (dir. Brian Gilbert, 1994)
- The House of Eliott - Lady Phylis Crowborough (BBC, 1994)
- Wide-Eyed and Legless - Doctor Roper (dir. Richard Loncraine, 1993)
- The Casebook of Sherlock Holmes, The Eligible Bachelor – Flora Miller (Granada, 1993)
- A Masculine Ending – Miriam Morris (dir. Antonia Bird, 1992)
- Trainer – Toni Mountford (BBC, 1992)
- Agatha Christie's Poirot, The Mysterious Affair at Styles – Evelyn Howard (LWT, 1990)
- All Creatures Great and Small, The New World - Lady Hulton (BBC, 1989)
- The Ginger Tree – Alicia Bassett-Hill (BBC, 1989)
- The Franchise Affair - Marion Sharp (BBC, 1988)
- Wreath of Roses - Camilla (Granada, 1987)
- A Still Small Shout - Lift Girl (dir. Mike Vardy, 1985)
- Coriolanus - Virgilia (BBC, 1984)
- Crown Court: Love & War – Hilary Rogers (ITV, 1984)
- By the Sword Divided - Frances Neville (BBC, 1983)
- Henry VI part 1 - the Countess of Auvergne (BBC, 1983)
- Bognor - Monica Becket (Thames TV, 1981)
- Hopscotch -bookshop cashier (dir. Ronald Neame, 1980)
- Testament of Youth, 1918 - Winifred Holtby (BBC, 1979)
- Pygmalion - Clara Eynsford Hill (BBC, 1973)
- Barbara of the House of Grebe - Barbara (BBC, 1973)
- Nickel Queen - Jenny (dir. John McCallum, 1971)

== Selected stage work ==
- Uncle Vanya - Maria (HOME Theatre Manchester, 2017)
- Hobson's Choice - Mrs Hepworth (Vaudeville Theatre, 2016)
- The Importance of Being Earnest - Lady Bracknell (Salisbury Playhouse, 2009)
- Habeas Corpus - (Bath Theatre Royal, 2006)
- Cymbeline - Queen (Royal Shakespeare Company, 1997)
- Twelfth Night - Maria (Royal Shakespeare Company, 1994)
- Henry V - Mistress Quickly/Alice (Royal Shakespeare Company, 1994)
- Love's Labour's Lost - Princess of France (Bristol Old Vic, 1977)
- The Caucasian Chalk Circle - Grusha Vachnadze, with Frank Thring as Azdac (Melbourne Theatre Company, 1970)
- Blithe Spirit (play) - Ruth (Thorndike Theatre, 1979)
- Saratoga - Virginia Vanderpool (Royal Shakespeare Company, 1978)
- The Taming of the Shrew - Katherine (Young Vic Theatre, 1977)
- The Importance of Being Earnest - Gwendoline (Bristol Old Vic, 1976)
- As You Like It - Rosalind (Young Vic Theatre, 1975–76)
- A Midsummer Night's Dream - Helena (New Shakespeare Company, 1974)
- Macbeth - Lady Macbeth (Young Vic Theatre, 1974)
- Two Gentlemen of Verona - Sylvia (Young Vic Theatre, 1974)
- The Taming of the Shrew - Bianca (Crucible Theatre, 1972)
- Charley's Aunt - Kitty Verdun (Apollo Theatre, London, 1971)

== Selected radio drama appearances ==
- Doctor Who: Night Thoughts (Big Finish Productions)
- The Big Toe Radio Show (BBC 7)
- Waterloo Sunset (BBC Radio 4, dir. David Jackson Young)
- The Open Window: Claw Marks on The Curtain (BBC Radio 4, dir. Ned Chaillet)
- Meet Mr Mulliner (BBC Radio 4, dir. Ned Chaillet)
- Woman's Hour Short Stories (BBC Radio 4, dir. Pat McLoughlin)
- A Murder Is Announced (BBC Radio 4, dir. Enyd Williams)
- This Love, This Love (based on Harriette Wilson's memoirs, BBC Radio 4, dir. David Johnson)
- Dear Brutus (BBC Radio 4, dir. Caroline Raphael)
- A Wheel of Fortune (BBC Radio 4, dir. Matthew Walters)
- The Other Woman (BBC Radio 4, dir. Jane Morgan)
- The Tortoise & The Hare (BBC Radio 4, dir. Caroline Raphael)
