= Saturday Drama =

BBC Radio 4 programme

Saturday Drama (formerly The Saturday Play) is a regular feature on BBC Radio 4 that contains various thrillers, mysteries, love stories and detective fiction, as well as an occasional special series.
