= Mia Soteriou =

British musician and actress

- Born: London, England
- Education: Royal College of Music; Oxford University
- Occupations: Musician, actress

Mia Soteriou is a British musician and actress.

== Early life and education ==
Soteriou was born in London. She studied piano at the Royal College of Music and English at Oxford University.

== Career ==
Soteriou has written music for and played in numerous stage productions, including Bob Eaton's Stags and Hens, Blood Red Roses and Lennon, where she played Yoko Ono. Her music for La Lupa (2001) and THe dYsFUnCKshOnalZ! (2007) was favourably mentioned in reviews.

On screen, among other roles, Soteriou appeared in the supporting role of Arina in the musical film Mamma Mia! (2008), for which she also worked as vocal coach. In television, she was cast as P.C. Paula Campbell in EastEnders (2003), as Dr. Sanghita Parma in Holby City (2007) and as Mirri Maz Duur in Game of Thrones (2011), among other productions. In radio, in 2026 she took over the role of Carol Tregorran in The Archers, and in 1985 she appeared in Space Force.
