= Ronald Mason (drama) =

British broadcasting executive and drama producer (1926– 997)

Ronald Mason (8 September 1926 – 16 January 1997) was a director and producer of drama for the BBC, a BBC executive in his native Northern Ireland at the height of the Troubles, the Head of BBC Radio Drama as successor to Martin Esslin and was active in the European Broadcasting Union (EBU).

Known universally throughout Irish and British theatrical and broadcasting circles as Ronnie, among the writers Mason championed, Brian Friel perhaps became the most prominent. Mason produced and directed Friel's earliest plays, A Sort of Freedom (16 January 1958) and To This Hard House (24 April 1958), for the BBC Northern Ireland Home Service on radio and later brought Friel's stage work to the BBC's national networks.

== Life and works ==
Ronald Charles Frederick Mason was born in Ballymena, County Antrim, the seventh child of a seventh child in a strongly Protestant community. Among his schoolmates in Ballymena was Ian Paisley, who was to become a major political figure in Unionist politics and a leading anti-Catholic, whom he was later to command to ‘Sit down, Ian’, when the Reverend Paisley began a peroration at the BBC during Mason's years as the BBC's Head of Programmes in Northern Ireland. The Reverend Paisley complied. Mason graduated from Queen's University, Belfast, and began his career teaching English and French in the 1940s. He joined the BBC six years later in 1955 as a radio producer in Belfast, finding a kindred spirit in the novelist, radio producer and broadcaster Sam Hanna Bell against BBC Belfast's prevailing caution in political matters, standing with Bell as an advocate for the shipyard worker turned controversial playwright, Sam Thompson.

After negotiating the treacherous BBC politics in Northern Ireland, successfully bringing new and established writers to the Northern Ireland Home Service and attracting attention in London, he joined BBC Radio Drama in London in 1963. As his successor as Head of Radio Drama, John Tydeman, described it in his obituary in The Independent, "he became executive producer of an innovative new series of 15-minute-long single plays broadcast every weekday evening at 11.45 under the title Just Before Midnight. The series gave great encouragement to new playwrights, including the young Tom Stoppard". Jill Hyem and Brian Friel would be among the other emerging playwrights.

His time in London also saw him producing and directing a twenty-hour-long production of Tolstoy's War and Peace , bringing plays by Friel to national prominence and directing work from Eugene O'Neill, Marguerite Duras and Christopher Hampton. During forays into television in the 1960s, he produced The Randy Dandy, by Stewart Love, ‘the Irish John Osborne’, and was director for the six-part series Here Lies Miss Sabry, starring Sebastian Shaw, produced by Dennis Vance and written by Raymond Bowers. He also oversaw a series of new plays called Double Image, among which he produced Tom Stoppard's British television debut, A Separate Peace in 1966 . His radio production of Friel's play The Loves of Cass McGuire in August 1969 preceded the Broadway premiere by two months and the Dublin premiere at the Abbey Theatre the following year.

== Head of Programmes, Northern Ireland (1970–1976) ==
His political acumen seemingly took him away from drama in 1970, when he returned to Belfast to assume the role of Head of Programmes, Northern Ireland. It was not a simple role of choosing programmes, but an essential and central role in redefining the BBC's presence in the province. Security was a continuing issue, bringing staff into safer buildings in the midst of a bombing campaign, and balancing the complicated demands of Protestant and Catholic communities.

Although Mason's time at Belfast's Broadcasting House saw him facing serious civil unrest, shown through the bomb attacks on the BBC, the violence had impact through all the province's cultural life, reducing audiences and seeing the closure of theatres. Mason was made vice-chairman of the Interplay Theatre Management Committee of the Arts Council of Northern Ireland, set up to form a company that would offer work to the ‘actors and actresses’, suffering unemployment in traditional theatres, by taking plays to schools. The work ranged from classical drama to Bernard Shaw's Arms and the Man, but also quickly added the living writer Stewart Love, whose work Mason had previously produced for the BBC.

Quoting from BBC files, John Tydeman, in his Independent obituary, presented Mason's response to a suggestion in 1972 from the BBC Director General, Charles Curran, that he might like some respite from the strain of the Troubles: "My duty is to Ireland. I intend to devote myself to the job of helping to make the province a better place in which to live." He continued to accept his responsibilities for another four years, including his leading role in the launch of BBC Radio Ulster in 1975. Tydeman described him as "a man of all Ireland".

== Head of Radio Drama (1976–1986) ==
On the back of his success in Northern Ireland, Mason was one of five people who might have become Controller of BBC Radio 4 in 1976 along with Monica Sims and David Hatch, both of whom were appointed some years later. In 1976, however, the post was given to Ian McIntyre, whose strict journalistic regime lasted only two years before he was moved to become Controller of Radio 3. In the meantime, Mason was invited back to London to take up the post of Head of Radio Drama on the impending departure of Martin Esslin, and became the third longest-serving head of one of the most culturally significant posts of the time. His entanglements with Ian McIntyre, however, were to last the rest of his time in radio.

One of the reasons for bringing Mason back to Radio Drama, above his proven success in the form, was the need for a politically savvy executive who could fight the corner for Radio Drama at one of the cyclical period of BBC cuts in funding. He did this with considerable success, and was held up as a model by European broadcasters also facing contractions in the relatively expensive form of radio art. Not everything was considered a success by Mason. In 1980, Radio Drama's most popular programme, the Radio Two daily soap, Waggoner's Walk (on air since 1969), was presented as a potential cut since its budget was almost exactly the requested savings. Although Mason also presented a fully costed alternative series of cuts across the drama output, BBC management opted for the simple expedient of axing the soap.

Meanwhile, Ian McIntyre's reign at Radio 3, with limited journalism in the musical output, saw McIntyre's intensive scrutiny of the spoken-word programmes. Drama became a particular target. When McIntyre blocked the broadcast of a Mason-commissioned radio drama by the writer and director Mike Leigh in May, 1979, Too Much of a Good Thing, recorded on location with convincing sexual activity, it set up a continuing conflict. Piers Plowright, in the book And Now on Radio 4 by Simon Elmes, recalled the occasion when Mason's fury at a Radio 3 meeting, in response to criticism of a radio play, led to Mason throwing a chair and leaving the meeting. Mike Leigh's play was not broadcast until 1992 some years after the departures of both Mason and McIntyre from their posts,

Mason continued to support his writers and his personal intervention in defending a Howard Barker script, Scenes from an Execution, which meant a line-by-line scrutiny of the play with negotiations that went down to the use of the word "groin". Richard Wortley's production, broadcast on Radio 3, features Glenda Jackson in the leading role. Despite his reservations, McIntyre nominated the production for Europe's grand prize for radio drama, the Prix Italia, which it won in 1985.

Mason's service on committees from the EBU, the Arts Council of Northern Ireland and the National Council for Drama Training was influential and rigorous. At the NCDT his support for removing the accreditation of a leading London drama college in the 1980s had positive effects for the NCDT, which was shown to be far from toothless, and for the college in question which improved impressively. His concern for drama training reflected his continuing support for BBC Radio Drama's annual award of contracts to graduating drama college students competing in the Carleton Hobbs Awards, named after one of British radio's most successful radio actors.

The tenacity of Mason's tenure secured radio drama as a key component in the corporation's public service commitments. His interventions preserved the bulk of the radio drama output, and its continuing integration with radio features, which, particularly in the work of Piers Plowright, brought European recognition to the department in several Prix Italia awards.

Preceded by D. G. Hannon	Head of Programmes, Northern Ireland; 1970–1976	Succeeded by Cecil N. Taylor
Preceded by Martin Esslin	Head of Radio Drama; 1976–1986	Succeeded by John Tydeman

== Later life ==
After his retirement, he returned to radio to produce John Arden and Margaretta D'Arcy's Whose is the Kingdom?, a nine-play sequence of dramas about Christianity. Arden and D’Arcy wrote to The Irish Times after Mason's death, reporting that his funeral had needed to be postponed by a week to accommodate the people who wished to attend, and, in their tribute, gave an insight into his working practices: ‘As a drama director, he was a natural radio genius and an educator both to playwrights and actors. He never seemed to forget that he had begun his adult life as a teacher: he would inspire his casts by getting up from the directorial chair, moving all over the studio, telling stories, and more or less improvising the whole play from start to finish, with a running fire, of folklorish anecdotes from his childhood in County Antrim.’

In his last years, Mason suffered from emphysema, related to his devotion to cigarettes, but even then, as Oscar Wilde's grandson, Merlin Holland, wrote to The Independent, Mason called in his estimable contacts to secure Wilde's place in Poet's Corner at Westminster Abbey when he realised that a "fellow Irishman" had been denied his rightful place. "Without Ronald Mason's taking the initiative, despite his ill-health, Wilde might still be waiting" wrote Merlin Holland. "The ceremony on 14 February 1995 drew the biggest Poets' Corner crowd since Byron's inclusion in the 1960s".

Mason died of emphysema, still smoking next to his oxygen tank, in London on 16 January 1997. He was 70 years old.

== Radio plays ==
Radio plays directed or produced by Ronald Mason
Date first broadcast	Play	Author	Cast	Synopsis Awards	Station Series
16 January 1958	A Sort of Freedom	Brian Friel	Harold Goldblatt, Doreen Hepburn, Wolsey Gracey, Ann Maguire, Colin Blakely, Eleanor McFadzean, Charlie Witherspoon	Recorded Sunday, 12 January 1958	BBC Northern Ireland Home Service
24 April 1958	To This Hard Place	Brian Friel	William Hunter, Irene Bingham, Patricia Calderwood, William McKay Kenny, Myrtle Douglas, Michael Baguley	Recorded Sunday, 20 April 1958	BBC Northern Ireland Home Service
5 January 1959	The Whiteheaded Boy	Lennox Robinson	Nita Hardie, Maurice O'Callaghan, John Reid, Irene Bingham, Margaret D’Arcy, Kathleen Feenan, Denys Hawthorne, Elizabeth Begley, James Ellis, Patrick Magee, Eileen Madden and Ann Maguire	The Geoghegans are prosperous shop-keepers in an Irish country town. Denis, the youngest of the family, is his mother's darling and nothing is too good for him. He is now a gay young man at the university.	BBC Home Service
15 November 1960	The Old House	Maurice Leitch	J. G. Devlin, Gertrude Russell, James Ellis, Catherine Gibson and Maurice O'Callaghan	An old couple living in a tied country cottage are visited by their son from Belfast who has come to persuade them to move to his house in the city before they are evicted. The old man finds it impossible to come to terms with the move and there is a crisis involving a loaded gun. Things will never be the same. A play about getting old in a cruel new world.	BBC Radio Northern Ireland Home Service
9 September 1963	The Enemy Within	Brian Friel	Ray McAnally, Will Leighton, J. G. Devlin, R. H. MacCandless, Joseph Dunlop, David Duke, Paul Stewart, Michael Duffy and Derek Bailey	A drama about the Patron Saint of Derry, St. Columba of the sixth century A.D., which Friel describes as neither a history nor a biography but an imaginative account of the voluntary exile of St. Columba from Ireland to Iona. The worldly pressures of nation and family confront Columba in his inspirational commitment to his vocation in the Church. Broadcast on June 6 in the Northern Ireland Home Service	BBC Home Service
9 March 1964	The Founder Members	Brian Friel	George Merritt, James Thomason, John Baddeley, John Ruddock, Mary O'Farrell, Isabel Rennie and Jo Manning Wilson	Just Before Midnight; A fifteen-minute play in a nightly series.	BBC Light Programme
13 April 1964	The Blind Mice	Brian Friel	John McBride, Gertrude Russell, Donal Donnelly, Denys Hawthorne, Kathleen Feenan, Desmond Perry, Patrick McAlinney, James Greene, John Ruddock, Fraser Kerr and Catherine Gibson	Father Chris Carroll returns home to his family after five years in a Chinese Communist prison. His sister's boyfriend reveals a devastating secret. The play remains unpublished. First broadcast on November 28, 1963, in the Northern Ireland Home Service.	BBC Home Service
25 February 1965	Philadelphia, Here I Come!	Brian Friel	Donal Donnelly, Patrick Magee, J. G. Devlin, Patrick McAlinne, Harold Goldblatt, Gertrude Russell, Kate Binchy, Doreen Hepburn, Tommy Duggan, Ronald Wilson, Michael Stuart, Denys Hawthorne and Maurice Taylor.	Philadelphia awaits Gar O'Donnell tomorrow. But tonight he says goodbye: to an inarticulate father, to a few friends, to an old teacher. And the buffoonery necessary to make these partings bearable provides a counterpoint to the sadness of his going.	BBC Third Programme
4 January 1965	Over the Bridge	Sam Thompson	J. G. Devlin, Elizabeth Begley, Donal Donnelly, Charles Witherspoon, Sam Thompson, James Boyce, Maurice O'Callaghan, Sam McCready, Graham Rea, John McBride, Kathleen Feenan, Catherine Gibson, Graeme Roberts and Sean Reid.	The landmark Belfast play, first performed in 1960 following its controversial cancellation by the Ulster Group Theatre in the middle of rehearsal in 1959: Set in the Belfast shipyards in the 1950s, with the IRA's Border campaign underway, a simple trade union dispute develops into dangerous sectarian strife.	BBC Home Service
22 July 1965	The Countess Cathleen	W. B. Yeats, adapted for broadcasting by W.R. Rodgers	Eithne Dunne, Ray McAnally, Eamonn Keane, R. H. MacCandless, Michael Duffy, Jack McQuoid. Kathleen Feenan, Irene Bingham, Gwendolyn Stewart, Catherine Gibson, Sam McCready, Liam O'Callaghan, Nita Hardie, Bryan Robson, Maurice O'Callaghan and Robert McLernon. Narrator: Peter Adair Music composed and conducted by Havelock Nelson	And starving men walk the fields on sticks And strike their sticks into the staggering ground As they fall, to mark their fall, till all the land Cries out with exclamation marks How will it end except in devilry	BBC Third Programme
29 November 1965	The Evangelist	Sam Thompson Adapted for broadcasting by Sam Hanna Bell	Ray McAnally, J. G. Devlin, Harold Goldblatt, Stephen Rea, Sean Reid, Michael Stewart, John McBride, Catherine Gibson, Maurice O'Callaghan, William Hunter, Diana Payan, Irene Bingham, Larry McCoubrey and Kathleen Feenan	An American evangelist comes to sectarian Belfast to revive the Faith and encounters a self-confessed agnostic who fights to prevent a young man from being caught up in fanatical religiosity. Faith versus scepticism is the substance of Sam Thompson's drama.	BBC Northern Ireland Home Service
9 August 1966	The Loves of Cass McGuire	Brian Friel	Siobhán McKenna, Sybil Thorndike, Mary O'Farrell, Carleton Hobbs, Liam Redmond, Peter Mayock, Sheelagh Cullen, Patrick McAlinney, Peggy Marshall and Shela Ward	As children we dream of the future – dreams without boundaries. In old age we dream of the past-a selective reconstructed past and we are kept living between innocence and senility by loving and being loved-or the illusions of loving and being loved.	BBC Third Programme
15 June 1967	Between the Two of Us	Rhys Adrian	Betty Hardy, Noel Hood, Anna Cropper, Alec McCowen, Ingrid Bower. Nigel Anthony, Leroy Lingwood, Ian Thompson and Brian Hewlett	' What am I supposed to do? ... If I approach you ... What will happen? ... And if I approach you.... What are you expecting? ... I might do all the wrong things ... '	BBC Third Programme
16 March 1968	The Fallen Idol	Graham Greene, adapted from the film story by Charles Hatton	Richard Pasco, Rachel Gurney, Judi Dench, Jean England, Peter Baldwin, Geoffrey Wincott, Rolf Lefebvre, Gudrun Ure, Beth Boyd, Nicholas Edmett, David Brierley, Victor Lucas, Barbara Mitchell, Lockwood West, Michael Deacon, and John Wyse	Recorded Thursday, 14 March 1968. Adapted from the film The Fallen Idol, written by Greene and directed by Carol Reed, which was an adaptation of Greene's short story "The Basement Room" (1936).	BBC Radio 4 (though listed on the script as BBC Home Service)
14 April 1968	Winners	Brian Friel	Fionnula Flanagan, Jim Norton, Denys Hawthorne and Marjorie Westbury	First broadcast: ' The past's over! And I hate this waiting time! I want the future to happen – I want to be in it – I want to be in it with you!'	BBC Radio 3
26 September 1968	Ella	Rhys Adrian	Brenda Bruce, Peter Jeffrey and Maurice Denham	A Comedy by Rhys Adrian: ' Choose wisely, my dear.' ' But I've already chosen. Ages ago. I've chosen the both of you.'	BBC Radio 3
17 March 1969	Becket	Jean Anouilh, Adapted for radio by Roger Pine, from the translation by Lucienne Hill	Ian Holm, David Buck, Peter Jeffrey, Patricia Gallimore, Geoffrey Wincott, Garard Green, Antony Vicars, Ralph Truman, Roger Gale, Marjorie Westbury, Kathleen Helme, David Brierley, David March, Peter Pratt and John Baddeley.	' Sire. crush them now, or in five years', time there will be two Kings in England, the Archbishop of Canterbury and you. And in ten years' time there will be only one.'	BBC Radio 4 World Theatre
1 May 1969	Total Eclipse	Christopher Hampton	Derek Godfrey, Kenneth Cranham, Gwen Watford, Marjorie Westbury, Rosalind Shanks, Haydn Jones, Kathleen Helme, David March, Nigel Hawthorne, Peter Pratt, Leonard Fenton and Barbara Mitchell	' My search for universal experience has led me here. To lead an idle, pointless life of poverty, as the minion of a bald, ugly, ageing, drunken lyric poet, who Clings on to me because his wife won'take him back.' Derek Godfrey as Verlaine and Kenneth Cranham as Rimbaud.	BBC Radio 3
6 June 1969	L'Amante anglaise	Marguerite Duras (translated by Barbara Bray)	Gwen Watford, Robert Eddison and Sean Barrett	Railway trunks throughout France had yielded up parts of a woman's body. The police traced the source to a single intersection at Viorne and the district soon produced its anatomist. Why had a fifty-one-year-old married woman murdered her deaf-and-dumb cousin?	BBC Radio 3
12 December 1969	Long Day's Journey Into Night	Eugene O'Neill	Irene Worth, Patrick Magee, Neil McCallum, Robert Howay and Jan Edwards.	' How can you understand, when I don't myself. I've never understood anything about It, except that one day long ago I found I could no longer call my soul my own. But some day, dear, I will find it again when I see you healthy, happy and successful – some day when the Blessed Virgin forgives me and gives me back my faith in her love and pity.'	BBC Radio 3
20 March 1970	L'Impomptu de l'Alma or, The Shepherd's Chameleon	Eugène Ionesco, translated by Sasha Moorsom	Anthony Jacobs, Denys Blakelock, Francis de Wolff, Grizelda Hervey and Donal Donnelly (as Ionesco)	' The experience of an artist can, at any moment, be endangered by the preconceived ideas of fanatical pedants. These dogmatic and narrow-minded people will always be the greatest menace to the creative artist.'	BBC Radio 3
23 November 1977	The Duck Variations	David Mamet	Cyril Shaps and Harry Towb	Mamet describes his play as Opus 10 – a piece with 14 variations on the theme of the duck. The scene is a park in a large North American city overlooking a great lake, where two old men are passing the time of day.	BBC Radio 3
18 February 1979	Heaven Scent	Barrie Keeffe	Nigel Anthony, Harold Kasket, John Hollis, Bill Monks, Renu Setna and Eva Stuart	A play in the Just Before Midnight series: Bob wakes up one morning and parked outside his house he finds a juggernaut containing a vast quantity of scent. It seems like a gift from the gods ... Winner of the Giles Cooper Award, 1979	BBC Radio 4
10 October 1982	Flos	David Pownall, Music composed directed by Stephen Boxer	Michael Williams, Robert Eddison, Mike Gwilym and Peter Vaughan. Musicians: Michael Chance, Ashley Stafford (altos), Phillip Salmon, John Potter (tenors), Richard Wistreich, Simon Grant (basses). Boy soloists Piers McLeish and Steven Harrold. Alastair McLachan (medieval fiddle), David Cornhill (percussion and bells), Jeremy Barlow (recorder, whistle, portative organ) Bob White (bagpipes, shawm)	Commissioned to celebrate the 60th anniversary of the BBC: In 1216 King John Is dying, his kingdom fraught with war and Intrigue. In Carlisle the confrontation between a Master Mason and a wily prior epitomises power struggles within church and state.	BBC Radio 3
31 October 1982	Ill Seen, Ill Said	Samuel Beckett	Patrick Magee	A monologue for radio. ‘y recalling the last months of the life of an old lady encased in a frail body, we come to have a perception of the end of life and the meaning of what has come and gone to bring us to this point. There emerges a fear that all our perception is ill-seen and ill-expressed.	BBC Radio 3
18 April 1986	A Piece of Monologue	Samuel Beckett	Ronald Pickup	‘Beckett at 80’: The first broadcast of A Piece of Monologue: ‘Nothing stirs anywhere. Nothing to be seen anywhere. Nothing to be heard anywhere. Room once full of sounds. Faint sounds. Whence unknown. Fewer and fainter as time wore on. Nights wore on. None now.’	BBC Radio 3
