= Elizabeth Begley =

British actress (1907–1993)

- Born: 1907; County Carlow, Ireland
- Died: 1993 (aged 85–86); Belfast, Northern Ireland
- Other name: Lily Begley
- Occupation: Actress
- Years active: 1929–1982
- Known for: Ulster Group Theatre

Elizabeth Begley (1907 – 1993), initially billed as Lily Begley, was an Irish actress whose career encompassed theatre, television and film, perhaps best known for her breakthrough television performance as Mrs. Bratney in the 1959 Armchair Theatre episode, "Worm in the Bud", and—on that same ITV-hosted series—for two starring roles opposite British actor Donald Pleasence. For the two decades prior to that, Begley had been a prominently featured player—and one of the founding members—of the Ulster Group Theatre of Belfast.

== Early life and career ==
Born in 1907, in County Carlow, Ireland, Begley was the daughter of respective Magilligan and County Down natives, Mr. and Mrs. William Begley. During this period her father served with the Royal Irish Constabulary and, thus, it was not until after "The Troubles"—meaning, presumably, not until the early to mid 1920s–that the Begleys finally made their way north to Belfast.

=== Theatre ===
Although Begley would later describe her professional debut as having taken place in Dublin, performing the works of Thomas Carnduff with Richard Hayward's company (something that did in fact occur in 1937), the fact remains that Begley"s membership in Hayward's company—complete with glowing reviews for her part therein—dates back to at least 1933, in Belfast. In fact, comparable press mentions of Begley's pre-Hayward work—all of which took place in Belfast—extend at least back to the previous decade, beginning in January 1929 with her appearance in Lynn C. Doyle's Love and Land, with St. Lawrence's Dramatic Society, and including her work in the impromptu company of Cathal O'Byrne in 1931.

Among her most impactful Group Theatre appearances are Begley's portrayals of Gerty "Gugs" Marley in Joseph Tomelty's Barnum Was Right (1939), Mrs. M'Bratney in Boyd's Shop by St. John Greer Ervine, the protagonist's "shrewish wife" in Tomelty's Poor Errand, co-starring with Tomelty in George Shiels's The Old Broom, as Ellen Carey, the "bewildered, self-sacrificing widow, given impressive dignity by Elizabeth Begley" in Shiels' The New Gossoon, her "skill[ful] portray[al of] the hard-hearted, self-seeking mother [and] her degeneration into a drink-sodden harridan" in Vincent Carroll's Things That Are Caesar's, "happily cast as the mother of the family, and giv[ing] one of her best performances" in the Shiels comedy, Borderwine, Mrs. Davidson in Patricia O'Connor's Highly Efficient Hannah McCook in Shiels's Macook's Corner, Widow Dougherty in Doyle's Love and Land, Daisy Mullan in the Shiels comedy, Paul Twyning, Mrs. Adams in Patricia O'Connor's Master Adams, Katrine Quinn in Tomelty's All Souls' Night, Mrs. Madigan in Sean O'Casey's Juno and the Paycock, Mrs. Dolman in the Shiels comedy, Quin's Secret, Father Malan's housekeeper in Tomelty's Is the Priest at Home?, and Ellen—to J. G. Devlin's Patrick—in Gerard McLarnon's The Back Window.

In one notable post-UGT appearance, Begley portrayed Mrs. Henderson in a production of Sean O'Casey's The Shadow of a Gunman, directed by Jack MacGowran (who also starred as Seamas Shields), alongside Brian Phelan as Donal Davoren, a young Stephen Rea as Tommy Owens, and the playwright's daughter Shivaun as Minnie Powell.

But it was the controversy surrounding the Group's 1958 production, Over the Bridge, and the company's ensuing dissolution that ushered in Begley's transition to the small screen the following year.

=== Television ===
Back in February 1954 (in what would prove more a low-profile foreshadowing than a full-fledged debut (Note: One reviewer notes that while Begley was "of course, splendid, [...] it was a small part which gave her little scope".)), Begley, with no fanfare whatsoever, had already made her first-ever screen appearance as Mrs. Clotworthy in the BBC Sunday Night Theatre adaptation of St. John Greer Ervine's stage comedy, Boyd's Shop.

In the fall of 1959, with starring roles in two well-received installments of Armchair Theatre (John D, Stewart's "Worm in the Bud" and "A Shilling for the Evil Day"), Begley began her television career in earnest.

The following year, another Armchair episode, "The Cupboard" (penned by Ray Rigby and directed by David Greene), paired Begley with British actor Donald Pleasence; the latter as a behind-in-his-rent tenant with a mysteriously missing wife and some newly papered-over wardrobes, the former as his landlady, whose announcement that building is about to be sold and that he has exactly 24 hours to pay up in full instantly ratchets up the episode's tension manyfold. On September 26, 1965, Begley and Pleasence were reunited in the Armchair Mystery Theatre presentation of "Ambrose", a part scripted, part improvised adaptation of Mary Hocking's like-named short story, published the previous year.

UTV's 1967 episode, "Boatman Do Not Tarry"–aired on ITV the following year–reunited Begley with "Worm in the Bud" scripter John D. Stewart.

In 1970, Begley starred in the series premiere of Granada TV's The Sinners, playing the title character in Hugh Leonard's adaptation of Sean O'Faolain's Mother Mathilde's Book. The following year, Begley served as the titular guest star of yet another series premiere, portraying Philomena Hawley in "Philomena and the Tatty Howkers", the first installment of the BBC-2 series, The View from Daniel Pike.

In 1972, Begley starred opposite her old friend and fellow Group Theatre alumnus J. G. Devlin in the Play for Today episode, "Carson County".

== Personal life ==
On September 25, 1959, the night before her career-changing TV debut, a brief profile published in the Walsall Observer disclosed two of Begley's self-professed "pet hates"; namely, housework and telephones. Moreover, it concludes, "She refuses to have a telephone installed in her home." A slightly more extended and considerably more probing interview, conducted in February 1961 by Belfast Telegraph columnist Martin Wallace, finds a surprisingly forthcoming Begley holding forth on a variety of subjects.

The strange thing—and it is not apparent in the theatre, where she has great presence—is that she claims to lack confidence in her work. Possibly this is why she prefers comedy, with the audience's reassuring laughter. Possibly it is why she escapes so often into old women's parts. She is unmarried, incidentally, and her life is the simple, narrow one which most theatre people live. Her needs are few—'a comfortable bed and a good fire.' She likes visiting people, and reads anything from Wodehouse to "Wuthering Heights." When not working, she is lazy. In her approah to the theatre, Elizabeth Begley is conservative, and even puritanical; in particular, she regrets the decline of the family play. 'I have plain tastes,' she confesses. "And if a play entertains me, I don't dissect it."

On April 3, 1960, Des Hickey of the Sunday Independent disclosed that Begley's 21-year-old nephew, James Quinn, would be among the aspiring actors appearing later that week in a student production of Lennox Robinson's Drama at Inish, staged at the Brendan Smith Academy of Acting. Attending the final performance, the Evening Herald's G. O'R. notes that the production went well, with Quinn, along with the other supporting players, giving "well judged performances".

Begley died in 1993, in Belfast.

== Filmography ==
- BBC Sunday Night Theatre
  - Ep. "Boyd's Shop" (1954) as Mrs. Clotworthy
- Armchair Theatre
  - Ep. 3.55 "Worm in the Bud" (1959) as Mrs. Bratney
  - Ep. 3.60 "A Shilling for the Evil Day" (1959) as Katherine Quinn
  - Ep. 3.72 "Fifth Floor People" (1960) as Mrs. Frazer
  - Ep. 4.14 "The Cupboard" (1960) as Mrs. Sparrow
- Saturday Playhouse
  - Ep. "The Country Boy" (1960) as Mary Kate Maher
- Sons and Lovers (1960) as Mrs. Radford
- Police Surgeon
  - Ep. "Three's a Crowd" (1960) as Mrs. Carroll
- Jango
  - Ep. Great Day for Jango (1961) as Mrs. Murphy
- The Randy Dandy (1961, TV film) as Mrs. Blaney
- Dangerous Afternoon (1961) as Mrs. Caldwell
- ITV Play of the Week
  - Ep. 6.52 "Over the Bridge" (1961) as Nellie Mitchell
  - Ep. 7.29 "Birds in the Wilderness" (1962) as Rosa Denchfield
  - Ep. 8.14 "A Letter from the General" (1962) as Sister Magdalen
- Z Cars
  - Ep. 1.8 "Family Feud" (1962) as Great Grandma Maddigan
  - Ep. 1.14 "Found Abandoned" (1962) as Annie
- Tales of Mystery
  - Ep. 3.2 "The Doll" (1963) as Mrs. O'Reilly
- BBC Sunday-Night Play
  - Ep. 4.26 "The Big Donkey" (1963) as Mary
- Moonstrike
  - Ep. 1.15 "Last Act" (1963) as Madame Sissons
- Maupassant (TV series)
  - Ep. 1.5 "Women and Money" (1963) as Mere Rapet
- No Hiding Place
  - Ep. 5.16 "Peggy" (1963) as Mrs. Perkins
- The Plane Makers
  - Recurring (1963–64) as Margie Thomas
- The Leather Boys (1964) as Woman Receptionist
- The Edgar Wallace Mystery Theatre
  - Ep. 5.9 "Face of a Stranger" (1964) as Mrs. Holden
- Alexander Graham Bell
  - Eps. 2.2, 2.3 "A Note in Music" and "A Rival in the Field" (1965) as Mrs. Connor
- Armchair Mystery Theatre
  - Ep. 3.15 "Ambrose" (1965) as Adeline
- The Wednesday Play
  - Ep. 2.18 "Cemented with Love" (1965) as Ethel Kerr
  - Ep. 6.20 "A Crucial Week in the Life of a Grocer's Assistant" (1967) as Mother
  - Ep. 7.5 "The Devil a Monk Would Be" (1967) as Auntie
  - Ep. 8.11 "Nothing Will Be the Same" (1968) as Landlady
- Dr. Finlay's Casebook
  - Ep. 4.25 "The Decision" (1966) as Mrs. Douglas
- The Likely Lads
  - Ep. 3.7 "Love and Marriage" (1966) as Mrs. Foster
- This Man Craig
  - Ep. 2.13 "Fresh Off the Boat" (1966) as Norah Maddox
- Out of the Unknown
  - Ep. "Walk's End" (1966) as Matron
- Thirty-Minute Theatre
  - Ep. 1.19 "The Sugar Cubes" (1966) as Mother
  - Ep. 3. "Snakes and Reptiles" (1968) as Missus
- Dixon of Dock Green
  - Ep. 12.27 "The Complaint" (1966) as Mrs. Gibbard
  - Ep. 17.13 "The Shotgun" (1971) as Lil Monaghan
- Mystery and Imagination
  - Ep. 3.2 "The Listener" (1968) as Mrs. Monson
- Gazette
  - Ep. 1.8 "The Old Folks at Home" (1968) as Mrs. Parsons
- ITV Playhouse
  - Ep. 1.41 "Boatman Do Not Tarry" (1968) as Sarah Corby
  - Ep. 2.32 "Square on the Hypotenuse" (1969) as Tilly
  - Ep. 3.7 "The Patriot Game" (1970) as Mrs. McKiernon
- The Mind of Mr. J.G. Reeder
  - Ep. 1.2 "The Stealer of Marble" (1969) as Mrs. Welford
- Me Mammy
  - Recurring (1969–1971) as Mrs. Canaan
- The Main Chance
  - Ep. 2.4 "A Little Black and White Lie" (1970) as Mrs. Donnell
- The Sinners
  - Ep. 1.1 "Mother Matilda's Book" (1970) as Mother Matilda
  - Ep. 2.1 "The Holy Door" (1971) as Mrs. Cashman
- ITV Saturday Night Theatre
  - Ep. 3.7 "The Dead" (1971) as Mrs. Malins
- The Liver Birds
  - Ep. 2.5 "The Good Samaritan" (1971) as Gerry's Mother
- Paul Temple
  - Ep. 3.11 "Cue Murder!" (1971) as Mrs. Mary Donnelly
- Under and Over
  - Ep. 1.4 "The Sunday Colour Supplement" (1971) as Mrs. Mulligan
- The View from Daniel Pike
  - Ep. "Philomena and the Tattie-Howkers" (1971) as Philomena Hawley
- Tales from the Lazy Acre
  - Ep. 1.1 "The Pick-Pocketer" (1972) as Mrs. Dunphy
  - Ep. 1.7 "The Traveling Woman" (1972) as Mrs. Hoorihan
- In for a Penny
  - Ep. 1.4 "Dan and the Connubial Bliss" (1972) as Norah
- Play for Today
  - Ep. 3.3 "Carson Country" (1972) as Sarah Curdie
  - Ep. 7.6 "Your Man from Six Counties" (1976) as Annie
- Some Mothers Do 'Ave 'Em
  - Ep. 1.5 "The Hospital Visit" (1973) as Mrs. White
- Black and Blue
  - 'Ep. 1.3 "High Kampf" (1973) as Mother Superior
- 2nd House
  - Ep. 1.3 "An Anthology for November" (1973) as Maria in Clay
- Crown Court
  - Eps. 2.131–132 "The Age of Leo Trotsky (Pts. 1 & 2)" (1973) as Ireen Richards
- Great Short Stories
  - Ep. "Clay" (1974) as Maria
- Merry Go Round
  - Eps. "The Sleepers on the Hill (Pts 1 thru 3)" (1975) as Miss Cooney
- The Sweeney
  - "Trap" (1975) as Mrs. Riley
- The Crezz
  - Recurring (1976) as Mrs. Macarthy
- The Strange Affair of Adelaide Harris
  - Eps. 1.4 thru 1.6 (1979) as Mrs. Bonney
- The Outsider (1979) as Mrs. Cochran
- Harry's Game (1982, TV miniseries) as Mrs. Duncan
