= Maurice Leitch =

Northern Irish writer (1933–2023)

Maurice Leitch MBE
- Born: 5 July 1933; Muckamore, County Antrim, Northern Ireland
- Died: 26 September 2023 (aged 90); Canterbury, Kent, England
- Citizenship: United Kingdom
- Occupations: Novelist, short story writer and dramatist
- Writing career
- Language: English
- Notable works: Poor Lazarus; Silver's City; Chinese Whispers

Maurice Henry Leitch MBE (5 July 1933 – 26 September 2023) was a Northern Irish author. Leitch's work included novels, short stories, dramas, screenplays and radio and television documentaries. His first novel was The Liberty Lad, published in 1965. His second novel, Poor Lazarus was awarded the Guardian Fiction Prize in 1969, and Silver's City won the Whitbread Prize in 1981.

Leitch taught in primary schools in County Antrim for several years before joining BBC Northern Ireland in 1960 as a producer/writer. In 1970, he moved to London to become a producer in the BBC's Radio drama department. From 1977 until 1989 he was editor of Radio Four's Book at Bedtime, until leaving in 1989 to write full-time. In the 1999 New Year Honours, he was appointed a Member of the Order of the British Empire (MBE) for services to literature.

Leitch died on 26 September 2023, at the age of 90.

== Life and works – Ireland ==
Maurice Henry Leitch was born in the village of Muckamore, County Antrim, to Jean, née Coid, and Andrew Leitch of Templepatrick, Antrim on 5 July 1933. He was educated at Methodist College Belfast, and Stranmillis College. For a novelist whose characterful Protestant voice was to jostle with traditional Irish Catholic writing throughout his career, his Protestant background continues to provide a nearly unique perspective on a troubled Irish history, indeed, according to The Cambridge Companion to the Irish Novel, anticipating the Troubles by revealing the 'terminal decay, sullen hatred and sour futility in his region', notably in his first novel, The Liberty Lad.

It was while teaching in the primary schools of County Antrim that Leitch began his professional writing, with pieces about the Antrim countryside published in the Belfast Telegraph, a countryside that would later prove far from bucolic in his novels. He moved on to short stories for Northern Ireland Children's Hour, before following the career path that had been established by the poet Louis MacNeice (1907–1963), and poets and writers of MacNeice's generation including W. R. Rodgers and Sam Hanna Bell who had paved the way for Ulster writers to join the BBC. In the Corporation their sensibility was encouraged and flourished and Leitch, by contributing features, and joining the BBC Features department in 1960 as a producer/writer was one of the last significant authors to emerge from the fertile Ulster tradition.

Adding Radio Drama to his repertoire in 1960 with The Old House, he wrote and produced documentaries during his time at the BBC in Belfast. The Liberty Lad was published in 1965, adding to his growing reputation with its portrait of a schoolmaster, a threatened mill closure and a corrupt unionist politician. It also caused a stir that went beyond the currently political, not least because of its representation of sexuality, including male homosexuality. In the book Banned in Ireland: Censorship and the Irish Writer, Leitch describes the reception he received at a personal level: 'I did get a lot of backlash, particularly my first book ... from people who knew me socially and from the village I came from. It still affects certain people. It seemed terribly shocking that I would actually mention the fact that homosexuality existed, particularly in an Irish context, whether North or South, because there's not much difference really between the attitudes North or South. It just seemed a subject worthy of writing about because it was another extension of repression. Ireland is sexually repressed; let's face it.' According to Jeff Dudgeon, in his articleMapping 100 Years of Gay Life in Belfast, Leitch also documented gay history with that book: 'The Royal Avenue (RA) Bar in Rosemary Street (the hotel's public bar, opposite the Red Barn pub) as portrayed in Maurice Leitch's fine 1965 novel The Liberty Lad (probably the earliest description of a gay bar in Irish literature) was the first in the city.'

His second novel, Poor Lazarus, was published in 1969, while Leitch was still living in Northern Ireland, and it, too, was banned in the South. This time the protagonist is Albert Yarr, an isolated – 'tormented' as described by Tom Paulin – Protestant in a predominantly Catholic area who is offered a temporary resurrection when he is recruited by a documentary film maker. This book, too, caused unease in the North, with references to the 'Romper Room' where the UDA tortured and murdered victims. The Belfast poet and cultural arbiter John Hewitt, a 'man of the left', was among those who objected. In her critical study of Hewitt, Poet John Hewitt, 1907–1987 and Criticism of Northern Irish Protestant Writing, Sarah Ferris points to Hewitt's cultural protectionism by quoting John Kilfeather: 'For years [Hewitt] black-mouthed ... Maurice Leitch and Robert Harbinson. He obscurely hinted that they let the Protestant side down – Leitch by his, in John's terms, extraordinary outburst against Orangeism in Poor Lazarus...' In England, Poor Lazarus was received with acclaim and awarded the Guardian Fiction Prize for 1969.

== Life and works – London ==
Radio Drama in London was a cultural powerhouse when Leitch joined in 1970, following the award of the Guardian Fiction Prize. Then, with Martin Esslin as Head of Radio Drama, it incorporated the Features Department (from 1967) that had produced Dylan Thomas's Under Milk Wood and the verse dramas of Louis MacNeice. It covered the spectrum from soap opera to Samuel Beckett and Harold Pinter, interspersed with literary readings and features across three of the BBC's four radio networks.

The legendary figures he followed into Broadcasting House and the BBC Club were later honored in Tell Me About It (2007), Leitch's novel about a young Irish features producer in 1960s London, roaming the streets with a tape recorder and a thirst for discovery.

While the novels are at the centre of Leitch's achievement, his work in broadcasting was significant, and contributed to his MBE. Among the dramas he produced were plays by James Follett and a dramatisation of Seán O'Casey's great autobiography, I Knock at the Door. A breadth of interest saw writers such as Vladimir Nabokov and B. Traven, Edna O'Brien, Carson McCullers, V. S. Naipaul, Katherine Mansfield and F. Scott Fitzgerald figure in the Book at Bedtime under his editorship, and he introduce new writers such as Timothy Mo – although after leaving the BBC he was to say: 'Most writers do all their serious reading before the age of thirty-five. After that I just read for purposes of research. Writing is hard enough as it is anyway, and enough to be going on with.' Despite this he went on to produce over 30 readings of Terry Pratchett's Discworld novels, abridged for Corgi Audio with Tony Robinson as the reader.

== Publications 1975–1994 ==
His third novel, Stamping Ground (1975) makes a bleak, visceral return to Ulster. 'This is the first novel Leitch published after his move to England from Northern Ireland, and the dour erotics of his first novels give way to something altogether darker', wrote Caroline Magennis in her de-construction of the novel in the 2014 essay He devours her with his gaze. Charting the shifting perspectives of the novel, which involve sexual assaults and a cruelly distant, almost pleasurable observation of one assault, she says of Stamping Ground: 'Embedded in this ambiguous title, is the problem of how to make misanthropic novels about frustration and sexual aggression in the Ulster countryside saleable'. That was a problem she saw in the publisher's soft-focus cover art, rather than the novel. Magennis found little that was soft in the storytelling, a narrative 'wherein hierarchies of power, for better or usually worse, are played out in the sexual arena'. The book also figures in George O'Brien's The Irish Novel 1960–2010, a year-by-year study of Irish novels, where Stamping Ground features between 1974's Gone in the Head by Ian Cochrane and 1976's The Stepdaughter by Caroline Blackwood.

There was no softening of subject-matter in his next novel, Silver's City, which waded deep into the muddle of Loyalist terrorism, confronting Protestant paramilitary forces and far from idealistic paymasters and focussing on the conflicts within the conscience of 'Silver Steele', a freed 'hero' of the struggle confronting a new brutality outside his prison. It won the Whitbread Prize (1981). His novella, Chinese Whispers, made into a BBC film by Stuart Burge with a script by Leitch, did not appear until 1987, the same year as his collection of short stories, The Hands of Cheryl Boyd and other stories. Burning Bridges followed in 1989.

Burning Bridges, familiar to Country music fans as the title of a song about leaving the past behind – 'Burning bridges behind me/ It's too late to turn back now ... I moved to a far away city/ Trying hard to forget about you' – is the story of two uprooted exiles from Ulster, Sonny and Hazel, who meet at the London funeral of a friend and set out on a summer odyssey to the West Country of England, trying to realise Sonny's dream of emulating the singer Hank Williams.

A review of his 1994 novel, Gilchrist, by the Roman Catholic Northern Ireland novelist Robert McLiam Wilson in the monthly Northern Ireland cultural and political magazine Fortnight, is cited by Caroline Magennis and also by Sarah Ferris and in the Ricorso website, A Knowledge of Irish Literature 1992–2012. Magennis comments: 'In this review, provocatively entitled, 'Rhythm Method', Wilson claimed that Protestant novelists lacked the 'cultural credit card' that he possessed, being 'born Catholic and working-class... The Protestant vision, the Protestant version, isn't popular. It's got no rhythm. It's white South African. It's too complicated. The Catholic version is familiar, more Irish somehow'.

Wilson exempts Leitch from the generalisation, and finds a compelling, harsh metre in Gilchrist, a novel about a 'smudged' Ulster preacher on the run to Spain with the church funds. 'Leitch writes brilliantly about the kind of pessimistic Protestant lust that threatens to burst Gilchrist at the seams [...] Leitch has given us a definitive Protestant portrait. A Prod with rhythm, a perverse and loathsome rhythm, but big passion, big grandeur all the same.'

== Publications 1995–2007 ==
Leitch's short story, 'Green Roads', originally published in The Hands of Cheryl Boyd and other stories, was collected in 1995's The Hurt World: Short Stories of the Troubles, edited by Michael Parker, and his next novel, The Smoke King, was published in 1998. Robert McLiam Wilson's words, on the cover of the Secker & Warburg edition, continue his argument from his review of Gilchrist: 'With The Smoke King, Maurice Leitch does what he's been doing for three decades, he raises his glorious, inconvenient voice ... a unique, troubling fiction, unpredictable and moving, shows Leitch's customary unremitting integrity and profound knowledge of what the novel is for.'

The story he tells in The Smoke King is set in the prejudice-filled Northern Ireland countryside during the Second World War, with the American forces stationed in Ulster preparing for the conflict in Europe. A conflict nearer to home is what Tom Adair describes in his review in The Independent: 'For the Yanks are bedding down in Ulster - but not alone. ... In the small market town near the edge of the lough, an American soldier, Willie Washington, is one of the gum-chewing black boys dispensing largesse in return for favours. Pearl is Willie's chosen dame; she's already a pariah, with her illegitimate children... But death stalks Willie like some memory of the Klan. In drunken confusion, he is caught up one night in a murder, and with Pearl's help, hides away on an uninhabited island in the lough. At this point Leitch's writerly shrewdness is at its sharpest. He cuts away from - not towards - the chase. The drama that fascinates him, and which comes to devour the reader, is the struggle within the novel's benighted characters. In the quietest, most desperate way, it is Lawlor, the local policeman, in whom that turmoil is written deepest.'

' With warm echoes of Gunter Grass's The Tin Drum', is the way Elizabeth Montgomery described Leitch's next novel, The Eggman's Apprentice, in her 2001 Guardian review, and Sue Leonard, in Books Ireland, welcomed it as 'a superb, beautifully structured novel, with its vivid characterisation'. The book was perhaps most succinctly placed in its cultural and stylistic context by the Belfast critic Ian Hill when he cited the novel while reviewing the acclaimed stage play Pumpgirl by Abbie Spallen in 2008: ' ... in truth, the characters in this four-letter word splattered tale have more similarities with Sam Shepard's tarnished trailer-trash losers and Maurice Leitch's masterly Ulster-set novel The Eggman's Apprentice which set out the mores of a rural northern Ireland where the lives of its poverty stricken dreamers - confined by soulless jobs and poor wages - are doomed by their addiction to a second hand proxy America of sugary beers, souped-up rusting cars, and Country 'n' Western music, where what sex they have is at the beck and call of any portly and sweaty local villain with a facility for fine quotations.'

His 2007 novel, Tell Me About It, was something of a ground-breaker, a novel published initially as an audiobook read by the author to great effect – Melissa McClements wrote in the Financial Times, 'Leitch narrates, and is the right man for the job. A natural raconteur, it sounds as if he's down the pub himself, regaling friends with his spiky wit and tall tales.' Or, again, as reviewed in Publishing News: 'It's a darkly surreal comic novel, and it works especially well as an audio book.'

A rumbustious, picaresque tale, Tell Me About It takes its inspiration from the fabled BBC Broadcasting House of the 1960s, in the years just before Leitch moved to London when the corridors and pubs were roamed by legendary producers, writers and actors such as Reggie Smith, Julian Maclaren-Ross and George Baker. Two outsiders, the young Northern Irish producer Blair Burnside and the Dublin journalist Crilly set out on a search for stories with Burnside attempting to record everything, while he can hang on to his tape-recorder. An extract from the novel was published in the Dublin literary magazine The Stinging Fly in the Summer 2015, devoted to Irish writers in London.

== Publications 2009–2023 ==
Dining at the Dunbar, a collection of seven short stories, was published by Lagan Press, Belfast, in 2009. The publisher described the collection as 'By turns savage, brutally candid, mordant and ironical'. In her interview with Leitch for the Belfast Telegraph, No bedtime read, on the book's publication, Janet Hardy describes one of the stories, The Valet's Room as 'one of the darkest stories in the new collection, Maurice has tackled a taboo subject by getting inside the minds of a couple of serial rapists. What is really clever is the way in which the characterisation and incidental details make Gerry Noonan and Declan Downey believable and, while hardly sympathetic figures, human'.

Moods and themes in the collection vary considerably. Swan-Song for the Nightingale, for instance, is a portrait of a former Irish country singer marinated in her memories and alcohol. Hear Me Out tells of an evangelical preacher who finds his voice, in a 'disquieting way'.

While Leitch's voice in the stories, as in his novels, is distinctly Irish, Hardy's interview draws out Leitch to acknowledged his influences, identifying the American authors Raymond Carver, John Cheever and William Faulkner, while also a writer nearer to home: 'You always go back to Joyce and The Dubliners — it's about storytelling.'

Leitch's next book, A Far Cry (2013), was also published by Northern Ireland's Lagan Press. The publisher had been established some 23 years earlier and had developed a fruitful relationship with the Arts Council of Northern Ireland. The publication of A Far Cry coincided with Lagan Press's move to Lagan Online and because of this, was hardly available outside of Belfast. On their website, the publishers explained: 'Whilst maintaining a commitment to original ideas of Lagan Press i.e. promoting works of literary, artistic, social and cultural importance ... we will no longer pursue this aim through physical print publishing.'

One of Leitch's most compelling narratives, the novel was 'physically published' but almost immediately warehoused when the publisher abandoned print. It is set in the west England city of Bristol, not Belfast, but the city's famous beauty spots are shaded by ominous shadows of a Northern Ireland that the main character, Walker, has fled. At night, when his new partner and her mixed race son are asleep, their warm relationship is replaced by searing images on a blank television screen of a small village on the northern Irish coast, and, in the publisher's words, of images of a 'terrible act to protect his friends from local paramilitary heavies'.

The way in which Leitch allows fear to emerge from beauty is exemplified by a visit to the tourist attraction of the camera obscura at Clifton Observatory, already tainted with racial tensions, but the famous 360 degree panorama of the city, reflected by the camera obscura, offers glimpses of inescapable conflict. What is really seen a reflection? The novel is intensely cinematic (the name chosen for the main character, Walker, is a clear nod to the Lee Marvin character in John Boorman’s violent classic, Point Blank (1967), and the book is a notable return to noir for the author.

Leitch's second novel of 2013, Seeking Mr Hare, was published in London by The Clerkenwell Press at Profile Books. He stepped off in another new direction with a narrative that carries on from an infamous series of crimes that shocked Edinburgh, Scotland, in 1828. The Burke and Hare murders were committed to sell the bodies of the victims for medical dissection. William Burke and William Hare were Irishmen who discovered the lucrative business of providing cadavers for Edinburgh's thriving business of anatomical lectures, with an eager client in the doctor and lecturer Robert Knox and went on to provide 16 fresh bodies. By turning King's evidence against Burke and Burke's wife, Hare was promised freedom.

It is known what happened to Burke: With the testimony of Hare, he was hanged and later publicly dissected. What happened to Hare remains largely a mystery. From the few details that describe Hare's exit from Edinburgh, Leitch weaves a sweeping tale of escape and pursuit. Seeking Mr Hare provides us with a man acutely aware of the danger of his own name, but also unaware of the dogged determination of a man hired to find him.

Like the sketchy details of Hare's departure, little remains of the pair's murderous landmarks, most notably absent is Hare's residence at Tanner's Close Lodging House where murders took place. However, near the hanging place, in Edinburgh's Grassmarket and Lawnmarket area, and near where the crimes were committed, an oddly fleshy pub bearing the name of Burke & Hare became, in the years leading up to the pandemic, a lap dancing bar. In January 2020 the Edinburgh Evening News reported an extension of the pub's ambitions to include life drawing classes.

George O'Brien]’s review of Leitch's novel, in The Irish Times, maintains that Leitch does not linger on the legends that have accumulated over the years: 'Leitch's Hare may vehemently deny being a resurrectionist, but those who have previously spoken for him, among them Robert Louis Stevenson and Ian Rankin, prefer the legend. This novel takes another tack in its unnerving success in bringing Hare down to earth, allowing him his voice, his amorality, his superior survival instincts. The evil that men do is all too recognisably banal in his account of himself, in which he's as unselfconscious as he is unapologetic, and where it's the pressure of the present and not the ghosts of the past that keep him going.'

O'Brien's review shows how Leitch has provided Ireland with something it may not want: the return of a notorious native son to his homeland where he reveals the roots of his character.

'We might like to pretend that Hare the murdering monster is not one of us', he writes, 'but there's no denying that he is, and this realisation has a further resonance as the bulk of the action takes place in his native northern Ireland. It was there that he cut his teeth as a Whiteboy (he claims), and where he and Hannah are subjected to casual violence, observe the ether-sodden yeomanry of mid Co Antrim, and decline the offer of life in a circus only to join a more spectacular show, the evangelical revival in Belfast, a city in which, Hare observes, 'people . . . had only two things of import in life, making money and going to church'.'

The novel's sharp sequences of adventures, a rushing series of vivid vignettes of the 1830s, are not entirely among the imagined characters Leitch provides. The author Thomas De Quincey, who also pursued Hare in his celebrated essay On Murder Considered as One of the Fine Arts, also joins the cast and the novel's ambitions are clear, and accomplished, as Leitch brings the seamier side of the enduring conflicts of the English and Irish following Hare's escape from Scotland.

O'Brien, a memoirist and Professor Emeritus of English at Georgetown University in Washington, D.C., was interviewed by The Irish Times in 2015. During the interview he was asked: 'Who is the most under-rated Irish author?'

'I don't know about under-rated', he replied, 'or about rating systems in general. But I do think Maurice Leitch is inexplicably the most under-valued Irish novelist of the past 50 years.'

== Published works ==
- The Liberty Lad (MacGibbon & Kee Ltd, London, 1965)
- Poor Lazarus (MacGibbon & Kee Ltd, London, 1969)
- Stamping Ground (Martin Secker & Warburg, London, 1975)
- Silver's City (Martin Secker & Warburg, London, 1981)
- Chinese Whispers (Hutchinson, London, 1987)
- The Hands of Cheryl Boyd and other stories (Hutchinson, London, 1987)
- Burning Bridges (Hutchinson, London, 1989)
- Gilchrist (Martin Secker &Warburg, 1994)
- The Smoke King (Martin Secker & Warburg, London, 1998)
- The Eggman's Apprentice (Martin Secker & Warburg, 2001)
- Tell Me About It (Absolute Audiobooks, 2007)
- Dining at the Dunbar (Lagan Press, Belfast, 2009)
- A Far Cry (Lagan Press, Belfast, 2013)
- Seeking Mr. Hare (The Clerkenwell Press/Profile Books, London, 2013)
- Gone to Earth (Turnpike Books, London, 2019)

== BBC television plays and screenplays ==
Television Plays and Screenplays written by Maurice Leitch
Date first broadcast	Play	Director	Cast	Synopsis Awards	Station Series
27 October 1980	Rifleman	David Gillard Producer: Terry Coles	Bryan Murray, Peter Jeffrey, Simon Cadell, Will Leighton, Joan Ogden, Derek Martin, Allan McLelland and Clinton Morris	Winner of The Pye Television Award for New Television Writers 1981: Private Semple returns to his Antrim home after the Battle of the Somme, the village's sole survivor from all the 'brave boys of Ulster' who volunteered, but the battle scars go far deeper than anyone suspects.	BBC Two Première Series Four
15 April 1983	Guests of the Nation	Donald McWhinnie	Timothy Spall, Tim Woodward, Ronan Smith, Liam Stack and Ron Flanagan	Play adapted from Frank O'Connor's story by Maurice Leitch set in County Cork in 1920. Two British soldiers, held hostage by the Irish Free Army strike up a relationship with their guards, but fail to win over the more politically committed Donovan.	BBC TV
8 March 1983	Gates of Gold	Jon Amiel Producers: Andrée Molyneux and Chris Parr	Peter Bayliss, Michael Duffy, Denys Hawthorne, Trudy Kelly, Helen McClenaghan, Bryan Murray, Louis Rolston and Sandra Voe	Play by Maurice Leitch set in Country Antrim. Two evangelists are touring the area, stirring up religious fervour in the quiet Presbyterian backwaters. The year is 1959.	BBC One Play for Today
2 August 1989	Chinese Whispers	Stuart Burge Producer: Robert Cooper	Niall Buggy, Gary Waldhorn, Martin Wenner, Annette Badland, Niall Cusack, Liam de Staic, Renny Krupinski, Tony Rohr and Breffni McKenna	Kenny's work as a nurse in a psychiatric hospital isn't just a job, it's a vocation. His special group of patients are his friends – his only friends. When a strange young man is introduced to the group, he threatens the love, discipline and respect that have been the very basis of Kenny's authority, and all that surrounds the institution is scant protection from the madness of the world beyond. Adapted from his original novella by Maurice Leitch. Music by Simon Rogers.	BBC Two ScreenPlay Series Four
16 March 1969	Fit-Ups, Or, Positively the Last Performance	Robin Wylie		A film of life in one of the last of the Irish road-shows: Existence as portable as the props, travelling light, living in transit, always thinking of the next town just ahead. Written and produced by Maurice Leitch. Winner of the Dublin Golden Harp Documentary Award for 1969.	BBC Two

== Further television ==
- Travellers' Tales: Dead Peaks of the Dolomites, BBC One, 1967. Europe's climbing playground; source of inspiration to Titian, Dante, and more recently a group of climbers who attempted the most difficult peak by its most direct and severe route. Written and presented by Maurice Leitch.
- Hidden Ground: Part Three, BBC Two, 1990: Third part of a series written and presented by Irish writers: Maurice Leitch, novelist and playwright, explores the staunchly Protestant area of Six Mile Valley in County Antrim, where he was born and reared. Producer: Bill Miskelly

== Radio plays ==
Radio Plays written by Maurice Leitch
Date first broadcast	Play	Director	Cast	Synopsis Awards	Station Series
15 November 1960	The Old House	Ronald Mason	J. G. Devlin, Gertrude Russell, James Ellis, Catherine Gibson and Maurice O'Callaghan	An old couple living in a tied country cottage are visited by their son from Belfast who has come to persuade them to move to his house in the city before they are evicted. The old man finds it impossible to come to terms with the move and there is a crisis involving a loaded gun. Things will never be the same. A play about getting old in a cruel new world	BBC Radio Northern Ireland Home Service
8 May 1978	A Little Bit of Heaven	Robert Cooper	Ian Hendry, Jane Knowles, J. G. Devlin, Mark Mulholland, Trudy Kelly, Doreen Hepburn, Stella McCusker, Maurice O'Callaghan, Desmond McAleer, Catherin Gibson and Patrick Brannigan	GERRY: There's a Hitchcock film with this bit in it of a tennis crowd.... and all the heads in the crowd are following the play.... but smack in the middle of them there's this one guy who's staring straight ahead. LINDA: . . . sounds kind of lonely. After 20 years, Gerry Mahood comes home to Ulster to find his only friends are nostalgia and whiskey.	BBC Radio 4 The Monday Play
24 October 1983	Woodcraft	Robert Cooper	Alex Jennings, Clive Panto, Eileen Tully, Timothy Bateson, Ian McElhinney, Jim Norton, Liam Neeson, Timothy Spall and Sylvestra Le Touzel	Victor Albert Cleghorn, 42, an Ulsterman now resident in Crawley, has been charged with trespassing on a woodland in East Sussex in the early hours of 18 June. Also arrested were two other Ulstermen; a motorcycle dispatch rider and a trainee hairdresser. Cleghorn later admitted possessing an offensive weapon and illegal broadcasting equipment....	BBC Radio 4 The Monday Play
16 February 1987	Flutes	Jeremy Howe	Derek Halligan, Mark Mulholland, Peter Quigley, Niall O'Brien, Clare Cathcart, Hugh Fraser, Anthony Finigan and Harry Towb	A world championship flute band from a run-down Ulster town make a concert tour to Toronto. As the band prepares for their first Orange parade away from home, personalities and politics clash.	BBC Radio 4 The Monday Play
13 February 1990	Where the Boys Are	Penny Gold	T. P. McKenna, Sean Barrett, Susan Fleetwood, Des McAleer, Anna Cropper, John Gabriel and Margaret Courtenay	The boys are together again for an evening of humour and nostalgia. But tribal rituals can be dangerous....	BBC Radio 3 Drama Now
15 December 1991	All the Uncrowned Heads of Europe	Ned Chaillet	T. P. McKenna, Ciarán Hinds, Eileen Way, Joanna Myers, Rio Fanning, Leonard Fenton, Maggie McCarthy, Pauline Letts, Amerjit Deu, Peter Gunn, Harry Webster, and Ronald Herdman. Piano: Mary Nash	A dying tradition of travelling theatre in Ireland during the late 1960s is the subject of Maurice Leitch's play, when lax borders suddenly become battle-zones and a way of life is threatened with extinction.	BBC Radio 4 Sunday Playhouse
27 May 1992	Introducing Fagan	Ned Chaillet	T. P. McKenna, Anita Dobson, Robin Weaver and Gordon Reid. Musician: Mia Soteriou	When Fagan, 'just Fagan', finishes his night's work as a club entertainer and goes home with two women, the results are hardly what he expects.	BBC Radio 4 Afternoon Play
25 April 1993 – 9 May 1993	Children of the Dead End Patrick MacGill, dramatised by Maurice Leitch	Eoin O'Callaghan	Gerard Murphy, Robert Taylor, Diane O'Kelly, Tim Loane, Kevin Flood, John Hewitt, Aine McCartney, Sean Caffrey, Stella McCusker, Trudy Kelly, Niall Cusak, Allen Docherty, Katy Gleadhill, Margaret D'Arcy, Bi Hogg, Finlay Welsh, Frances Low, Wendy Seager, Kenneth Glenaan, Grace Glover, James Bryce, Simon Donald, Crawford Logan, Anne Downie and Sheila Latimer	Patrick MacGill 's novel earned him condemnation from every pulpit and landowner in Ireland. His story follows the fate of two young people, almost destroyed by poverty, forced to leave Donegal and work the potato fields of Scotland. They plunge ever further into degradation.	BBC Radio 4 Classic Serial
24 April 1995	Silver's City	Ned Chaillet	Brian Cox, Freddie Boardley, James Nesbitt, Clare Cathcart, John Rogan, Sean Caffrey, Michael McKnight, Ethna Roddy, Valerie Lilley, Catherine White, Conleth Hill, Toby E. Byrne, Robert Patterson, Joshua Towb, and James Greene	Brian Cox stars as 'Silver' Steele in Maurice Leitch's play based on his Whitbread Prize-winning novel. Freed from imprisonment for terrorism by a Loyalist raid on his hospital room, Silver finds that his ideals have made him a dangerous anachronism in a changing Northern Ireland.	BBC Radio 4 The Monday Play
7 December 1999	A Shout in the Distance	Ned Chaillet	Andrew Scott, Sorcha Cusack, T. P. McKenna, James Greene, Gavin Muir, Gavin Stewart, Valerie Lilley and Elizabeth Bell	Featured as one of four plays celebrating 1,000 Years of Spoken English on Radio Four: A comedy of Irish manners is the last thing young Winston expects when he is uprooted from Northern Ireland and transplanted to London. But there is more than rhyming slang that he must learn to understand.	BBC Radio 4 Afternoon Play
10 April 2003	Swan-song for the Nightingale	Ned Chaillet Music direction by Neil Brand	Sorcha Cusack, Marty Rea, James Ellis, John Rogan, Stephen Hogan, James Greene and Norma Shehan	The sound of country music rings alarm bells for young Kevin, when it means that his 'has-been alcoholic' mother hits the comeback trail in Ireland, and wants to take him along. But he has a lot to learn about his mother, and other 'stars of yesteryear'. Starring Sorcha Cusack as Dolores Quinn.	BBC Radio 4 Afternoon Play Afternoon Play
23 February 2005	Something Cool	Ned Chaillet	Linda Marlowe, Jim Norton, Alyson Coote, Bruno Lastra and Claudio Rojas	In a Spanish bar, during the tourist off-season, Rose sits and waits for something to happen. As happy hour draws to a close, two strangers appear and the scene is set for an intense and unexpected confrontation.	BBC Radio 4 Afternoon Play
13 March 2007	The Hands of Cheryl Boyd	Eoin O'Callaghan	Zara Turner, Gerard Murphy, Stella McCusker, Laura Hughes, Dan Gordon, Michael Doherty, Derek Bailey, Sarah Gordon and Hannah R. Gordon	A young woman in a wheelchair falls foul of the law, but unbeknown to her, an overzealous Pastor lays plans for her salvation.	BBC Radio 4 Afternoon Play

== Further radio ==
- The Literature of the Bible: Sir Tyrone Guthrie, 'man of the theatre', recorded his personal selection from the Bible with Maurice Leitch a few weeks before his death in 1971, broadcast on Radio 3 in 1972
- Tender is the Night by F. Scott Fitzgerald, abridged in twenty parts by Keith Darvill, read by Kenneth Haigh, produced by Maurice Leitch. Radio 4, 1977.
- The Spy Who Came in from the Cold , written and read by John Le Carré in fifteen parts, Radio 4, 1978, produced by Maurice Leitch.
- The Third Policeman by Flann O'Brien, abridged in ten parts by Eric Ewens, read by Patrick Magee and produced by Maurice Leitch. Radio 4, 1979.
- Mother Ireland, written and read by Edna O'Brien as A Book at Bedtime, produced by Maurice Leitch, 1979.
- Novel on Yellow Paper by Stevie Smith, read by Anna Massey in A Book at Bedtime, produced by Maurice Leitch, 1980.
- The Handyman by Penelope Mortimer, read by Carole Hayman in A Book at Bedtime, produced by Maurice Leitch, 1983.
- Radio listings in the Maurice Leitch page, Radio Drama, Diversity Website, Sutton Elms
