= Silver's City =

1981 novel by Maurice Leitch

- 2017 Turnppike Books edition
- Author: Maurice Leitch
- Language: English
- Genre: Novel
- Publisher: Secker & Warburg, London
- Publication date: 1981
- Publication place: United Kingdom
- Pages: 180
- Awards: Whitbread Novel of the Year Award
- ISBN: 0-436-244136
- LC Class: PR6062.E46 S57 1995
- Preceded by: Stamping Ground
- Followed by: Chinese Whispers

Silver's City is a 1981 novel by Northern Irish author Maurice Leitch. It won the 1981 Whitbread Book Award for novel of the year and in 2017, on its republication by Northern Ireland's Turnpike Books, was described by his publisher as the "begetter of Northern noir". "Northern noir", also known as Ulster noir, is the Northern Ireland equivalent of Scandinavian Nordic noir, a distinct genre of crime fiction.

== Publication ==
After some 15 years of the Troubles, Northern Ireland's increasingly violent sectarian conflict, "Silver's City", publication in September 1981 by Secker & Warburg, introduced a new authenticity to the literature of Northern Ireland. Probing the open wound of divided Ulster loyalists, amid the killings and bombings, it is one of the seminal fictional portraits of the Troubles. Reassessing the book on its republication in 2017, Daniel Magennis wrote for the International Crime Fiction Research Group: 'Silver's City is a menacing and expertly written thriller which explores the disaffection of a people with their own home and lays bare the corrosive effects of casual and causeless violence. Silver's City is a place where violence seems woven into its fabric, a desolate stage for the self-defeating blood sport that was much – if not all – of the Troubles. '

== Plot summary ==
While Belfast is torn apart by a vicious, undeclared war, two men are engaged in a bitter and equally destructive private battle for vengeance. Ned Galloway, a streetwise hired gun, has abducted 'Silver' Steele a jailed Loyalist folk-hero who fired the first shot of the Troubles. Galloway's purpose – to prove who wields the real power in the city's battle-torn streets. While Galloway believes his anarchic skills can buy him a kind of freedom, Steele, having swapped a cell for the illusion of freedom, discovers that he no longer understands the mechanism and principles of the city he once fought for. Together they plunge towards the final confrontation. A confrontation where all who believe they pull the strings are proved dangerously, murderously wrong.

== Reception ==
Although "Poor Lazarus", Leitch's second novel, had won the Guardian Fiction Prize in 1969 and Leitch's reputation was growing, some in Northern Ireland's literary establishment – notably the poet and defender of Protestant culture, John Hewitt – had singled Leitch out for letting down the Protestant community. Hewitt was particularly critical of the 'extraordinary outburst' against Orangeism in Poor Lazarus.

Silver's City was Leitch's fourth novel, written when he had left Northern Ireland for London. As Leitch recalled it in an interview with David Roy for The Irish News in 2017: "I think it got one review in Belfast, in [literary magazine] The Honest Ulsterman ... My friends had been trying to keep it from me and when I saw it I just went ballistic – because it was the most awful, scurrilous, personal attack on the book ... because it was 'dirty'. I was ready to kill this bastard – and then about three days later it won the bloody Whitbread Prize!".

Apart from winning the Whitbread, it received highly respectful reviews from the English press.

- William Boyd, whose novel A Good Man in Africa was to win the Whitbread Prize for first novel in the same year, wrote in The Sunday Telegraph: 'It's not the action of the novel which stays in the mind so much as the precise delineation of the two personalities, both alien and both finely and unsettlingly rendered. '
- The London Review of Books, in a review by the literary critic Graham Hough, said: 'Maurice Leitch is a writer of considerable and sombre power. This is an arresting, imaginative evocation of a world so gangrened by hate and cruelty as to be beyond redemption. Its status, intended or achieved, as a historical report is something that an outsider can hardly judge.'
- When the first paperback edition of the book appeared in 1983, by Abacus, they quoted similar words from the Observer: 'Tight-lipped and tautly-bound venture into the destitutions of modern Belfast. The urban wilderness of Ulster... is well caught. But more, so is the spiritual desert of the embattled Ulster mind.'

== Radio adaptation ==
In 1995, a new paperback edition of Silver's City was published by Minerva. In the same year, Leitch dramatised the book for BBC Radio 4's Monday Play, a slot for the harder hitting dramas on the network. Brian Coxtook the role of Silver Steele, the Glaswegian actor Freddie Boardley played Ned Gallagher, the Northern Ireland actor James Nesbitt was Billy Bonner and Northern Ireland's Clare Cathcart took the female lead as Nan.
