= Bob Keegan =

Bob Keegan may refer to:

- Bob Keegan (baseball)
- Bob Keegan (actor)
