= John D. Stewart (writer) =

Northern Irish poet, playwright, journalist, civil engineer and civil rights activist

- Born: 1917; Belfast, Northern Ireland
- Died: 1988
- Education: Queen's University Belfast
- Occupation(s): Writer, playwright, activist, engineer
- Organization(s): Northern Ireland Civil Rights Association; The Honest Ulsterman; Northern Ireland Labour Party; Belfast Humanist Group

John D. Stewart (1917-1988) was a Northern Irish poet, playwright, journalist, civil engineer, and civil rights activist. Stewart was a founding member of the Northern Ireland Civil Rights Association, as well as a prominent humanist.

== Early life ==
John David Stewart was born in Belfast in 1917, one of two sons and three daughters born to presbyterian minister David Stewart and Eva Thorpe. David Stewart was a minister in Cregagh, east Belfast, as well as a founding member and joint secretary of the Presbyterian Historical Society.

Stewart studied engineering at Queen's University Belfast.

== Career ==
During the 1940s, John D. Stewart was Chief Engineer to the Northern Ireland Housing Trust. By the 1950s, Stewart was described as being a 'well-known Irish writer'. He was commissioned to write Danger, Men Working for an Arts Festival in Northern Ireland in 1951. This was described in The Stage as a play which "poses, and tries to answer, two important questions of the day. What makes men work? What is worth working for? The characters a group of craftsmen and labourers engaged in building a new hospital in Northern Ireland at the present time." In 1955, he worn first prize and 100 guineas for his play The Black Lamb, in a BBC Northern Ireland play competition. In 1959, the Daily Mirror called his Worm in the Bud "an unusual play with a strangely moving ending", and The Stage "a perfect example of writing overcoming a weak plot". Stewart also created programmes for children, including about Spain and his life abroad, broadcast on Children's Hour.

For ten years, Stewart lived and worked in Gibraltar as a civil engineer. During his time there, Stewart also worked as a journalist and critic on the Gibraltar Chronicle, and was a member of the management committee of the Garrison Library. He subsequently published an account of Gibraltar entitled Gibraltar: The Keystone.

Stewart returned to Belfast in the late 1960s, and acted as an expert witness in legal cases involving traffic accidents. He was involved with the Northern Ireland Labour Party, and described as 'a genuine socialist'.

He had a programme on BBC Radio called The Arts in Ulster. Stewart was a contributor to the Northern Irish literary magazine The Honest Ulsterman, alongside writers including Stevie Smith, John Hewitt, Gavin Ewart, and Roger McGough.

Stewart wrote a number of scripts for programmes produced by his friend, writer and broadcaster, Sam Hanna Bell. Bell wrote:

Above all I consider my job is being properly fulfilled when I am successful in encouraging Ulster men and women to write for their region. I have produced the work of almost every Ulster writer of note, and the earliest radio scripts of John D. Stewart, Roy McFadden, John O’Connor, Nesca Robb, Norman Harrison and Sam Thompson were feature programmes.

In 1972, Stewart was the subject of a painting by T.P. Flanagan, commissioned by the Arts Council of Northern Ireland.

In 1989, after his death, Stewart's Tartuffe Today (an adaptation of Molière's Tartuffe) was performed at the Lyric Theatre, Belfast.

== Bibliography ==
- Leviathan with a Hook (radio play) (1953)
- Worm in the Bud (play) (1959)
- Vulture Country (short story) in The Atlantic (August 1959)
- Border Incident (short story) in The Atlantic (July 1960)
- A Sparrow Falls (short story) in The Atlantic (March 1961)
- Danger, Men Working (play) (1961)
- Gibraltar: The Keystone (book) (1967)
- Boatman, Do Not Tarry (play) (1967)
