= Vivienne Harris (journalist) =

Vivienne Harris MBE (née Hytner; 7 November 1921 – 4 March 2011) was a British businesswoman, newspaper publisher and journalist who co-founded the Jewish Telegraph in December 1950 with her husband, Frank Harris. The couple married in 1949.

== Career ==
She was born Vivienne Hytner in Prestwich, Lancashire, England. Frank Harris, a freelance journalist, had relocated to Manchester from London. She and her husband co-founded the weekly Jewish Telegraph in their dining room in Salford, Greater Manchester, in 1950. Vivienne Harris oversaw much of the newspaper's expansion from its origins as a four-page weekly paper during the next sixty years, until 2011. Under Harris, the Jewish Telegraph expanded to local editions in Leeds, Liverpool and Glasgow, as well as Manchester. Her husband and newspaper co-founder Frank Harris died in 1979. Their son, Paul, became group editor while Vivienne remained financial director and co-owner until her death.

In June 1997, Harris was the recipient of the MBE for her contributions to journalism and to Greater Manchester. Harris was active in numerous charitable organizations, including Save the Children, the Citizens Advice Bureau of Salford, the League of Jewish Women, St Ann's Hospice and the Jewish Day Centre.

She addressed attendees at the Jewish Telegraph's 60th anniversary dinner in December 2010. Dignitaries at the event, which was held at the Radisson Blu Hotel at Manchester International Airport, included Bury's Lord Mayor and Mayoress, John and Brenda Byrne.

== Death ==
Vivienne Harris died at her home in Broughton Park on 4 March 2011, aged 89. She was survived by her sons, Paul, the Jewish Telegraph's present owner and editor and Jonathan.
