= No Surrender (1985 film) =

British comedy film by Alan Bleasdale

- Directed by: Peter Smith
- Written by: Alan Bleasdale
- Produced by: Mamoun Hassan
- Starring: Michael Angelis; Bernard Hill; Joanne Whalley; Ray McAnally; Elvis Costello
- Cinematography: Mick Coulter
- Edited by: Kevin Brownlow; Rodney Holland
- Music by: Daryl Runswick
- Distributed by: Circle Films (US); Palace Pictures/Video (UK)
- Release date: 1985
- Running time: 100 minutes
- Country: United Kingdom
- Language: English
- Budget: £2.34 million

No Surrender is a 1985 British comedy film written by Alan Bleasdale, directed by Peter Smith and produced by Mamoun Hassan.

Describing the commissioning process, Bleasdale said, "I went to the National Film Finance Corporation and told them I was never going to write Star Wars or Rambo Revisited or anything like that, so I just went ahead and wrote the film I wanted to write".

The film is set in Liverpool during New Year's Eve. A man has been hired as the new manager of a function hall, and has to deal with the last arrangements made by his disgruntled predecessor. The hall has been simultaneously booked by rival groups of militant Catholics and Protestants, the entertainers hired for the night are inept and their acts are likely to infuriate the clients, and a marching band of the Orange Order starts playing sectarian tunes. When brawls break out within the hall, the manager has to find a way to defuse the situation.

== Plot ==
On New Year's Eve in Liverpool, Michael becomes the new manager of the Charleston Club, a run-down function hall on an industrial waste ground which, he later discovers, is owned by an organised crime syndicate. He also discovers that the previous manager, MacArthur, in an attempt to spite the hall's owners, has hired it out to two groups of senior citizens for New Year's Eve; one group are hardline Catholics and the other are hardline Protestants, and the entertainment consists of a magician with stage fright, a gay comedian and his boyfriend, a talentless punk band, and a fancy dress competition with a non-existent prize.

The two parties arrive and are joined by another group of senior citizens who are suffering from senile dementia. After discovering MacArthur being tortured in a back room by the hall's owners, Michael, along with bouncer Bernard and kitchen porter Cheryl, attempts to keep things in order amid the threat of violence in the air.

As the night goes on, however, things start to go wrong; the comedian's routine is badly received, the magician has to pull out because of the death of his rabbit, and the band's poor performance prompts the groups to throw missiles at the stage while the band members fight amongst themselves. Meanwhile, things begin to boil over when former Loyalist boxer Billy McRacken strangles on-the-run terrorist Norman Donohue to death in a toilet cubicle after Norman makes comments about McRacken's daughter "marrying out", and an Orange Order marching band begins playing sectarian tunes, leading to a mass brawl in the toilets and the discovery of Norman's body. Meanwhile, Michael and Cheryl begin singing "If You Need Me" together on stage while Bernard phones the police, who arrive and defuse the situation.

The situation dies down by midnight, and the groups all go their separate ways peacefully. Michael and Cheryl share a kiss, before going back to Cheryl's house together. The film ends with McRacken phoning his daughter and asking to speak to his son-in-law, before wishing him a happy New Year.

== Cast ==
- Michael Angelis as Mike
- Avis Bunnage as Martha Gorman
- James Ellis as Paddy Burke
- Tom Georgeson as Mr. Ross
- Bernard Hill as Bernard
- Ray McAnally as Billy McRacken
- Mark Mulholland as Norman
- Joanne Whalley as Cheryl
- J.G. Devlin as George Gorman
- Vince Earl as Frank
- Ken Jones as Ronny
- Michael Ripper as Tony Bonaparte
- Marjorie Sudell as Barbara
- Joan Turner as Superwoman
- Richard Alexander as Smoking Kid
- Pamela Austin as Organist
- Elvis Costello as Rosco de Ville
- Ian Hart as Uncertain Menace
- Joe McGann as Second Policeman
- Mark McGann as Rock Group Leader
- James Culshaw as O'Gormans Taxi Driver

== Reception ==
Walter Goodman of The New York Times called it "a funny movie about a desperate condition."

Paul Attanasio of The Washington Post wrote: "No Surrender pretends to be a black comedy, but it really isn't -- it's just sour".
