= Ian Cochrane (novelist) =

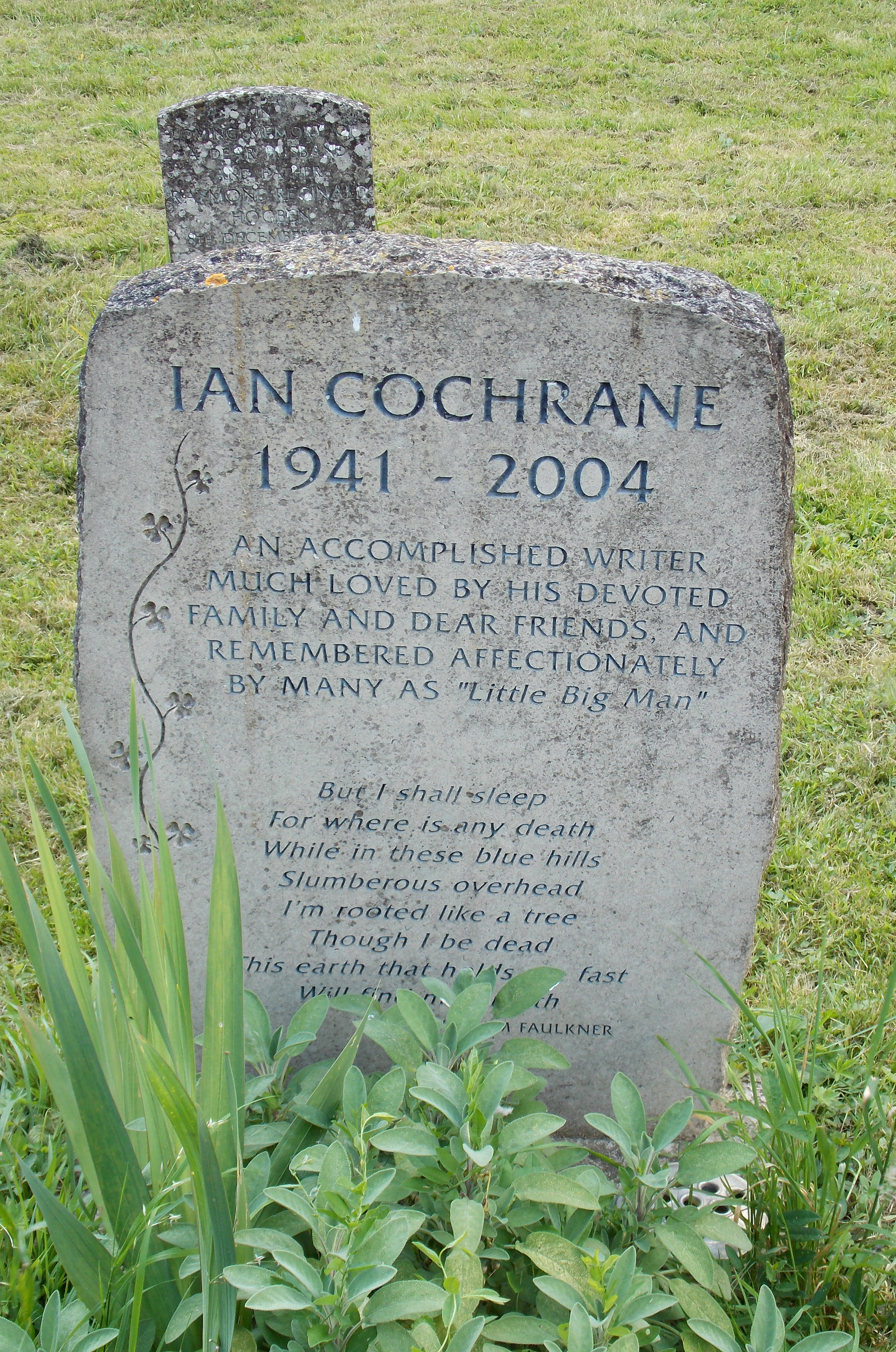
Headstone to Ian Cochrane in the cemetery of the Church of the Holy Cross, Goodnestone, Kent

Ian Cochrane (7 November 1941 – 7 September 2004) was a British novelist and creative writing teacher. His novels are known for dark humour and tragic endings.

== Biography ==
Cochrane was born in Moylarg and grew up in rural County Antrim in Northern Ireland. He said, "We lived in a little house right out in the country, with seven of us sleeping in one bedroom. But I don't think I realised we were living in poverty."

Later the family moved into one of the new council houses built after the Second World War, but Cochrane continued to attend the old two-roomed country school. This school had a female teacher at one end for the younger children and a male "master" at the other end for the older ones. The master in this case was the progressive R.L. Russell (author of The Child and His Pencil, 1935), who encouraged young Cochrane to write and gave him the confidence to escape to better things.

Cochrane moved to London in the late 1950s and after abandoning a variety of jobs was eventually able to live as a full-time writer. Stories began to appear in literary magazines and anthologies such as Faber's Introduction 4 (1971) and Penguin Modern Stories (1972). Cochrane's first novel, A Streak of Madness, was published in 1973, and his second, Gone in the Head (1974), was a runner-up for the Guardian Fiction Prize.

His 1972 marriage to Maggie Ogilvie ended amicably in 1979. Maggie Ogilvy remarried to Charles Manicom, and bore him a daughter, Charlotte. Cochrane remained a close friend of Maggie. Charles Manicom was happy to let Cochrane remain part of the family. Cochrane helped raise Charlotte. Cochrane and Charlotte were devoted to each other. That the arrangement worked so well is a tribute to the good nature and love of all concerned.

Cochrane had little time for organised religion, especially of the triumphalist proselytising sort. In later life he became interested in Buddhism, but he was fundamentally a humanist.

Cochrane would put himself out not only for friends but for anyone in need, sometimes at considerable risk to himself. On one occasion, in 1987, he was in an Oxford Street underground station late at night when he saw a group of eight to ten men beating up two others. He said, "They were punching and kicking one in particular, really laying into him. There were a lot of other people around but everyone else was just letting it happen. They probably would have killed that bloke if I hadn't stepped in." In this incident he received severe, lasting injuries that badly affected his ability to write and involved him in long, largely fruitless proceedings with the Criminal Injuries Compensation Board.

His resilience kept him going despite ill health and increasing blindness, and he continued to write novels even when publishing fashions made it increasingly difficult to publish anything quirky and original.

All Cochrane's novels were well received by critics. A new edition of F for Ferg was published in 2018 by Turnpike Books and a publication launch at the Seamus Heaney HomePlace involved a discussion of Cochrane's work with Maurice Leitch, Cochrane's friend and fellow novelist, Jan Carson, a contemporary novelist, and the academic Eamonn Hughes. His later fiction was more difficult to publish, and by his death all his works were out of print.

Ian Cochrane's voice was distinctive in modern British fiction. Many readers found his novels to be funny, bawdy, blasphemous, touching and sad. He is said to express the feelings of the marginalised: the young, the unemployed, and people nearly insane or unrespectable. His portrayal of their clashes with parents, priests, bosses and officials reveal all the absurdity, selfishness and hypocrisy of their supposed betters.

His books' titles have a jokey craziness, such as Jesus on a Stick (1975) or Ladybird in a Loony-bin (1977). F for Ferg (1980) is a typical Cochrane novel. It documents the antics of some lads who hang around factory gates looking for ways to have fun. They decide to involve the boss' son, the Fergus of the title, in a romantic hoax with someone else's girlfriend. It starts in a comic vein but ends with horribly fatal consequences.

Another classic Cochrane novel is The Slipstream. This novel is about the escapades of a group of Portobello wasters who attempt to rob the poor-box in the local church while one of their number distracts the priest with elaborate fake confessions. This novel also ends with the characters reaping more than they planned.

Cochrane's characters are often feckless, but treated with sympathy and humanity. Cochrane's exceptional ear for dialogue grants his characters the gift of life.

== Bibliography ==
=== Novels ===
- A Streak of Madness (1973)
- Gone in the Head (1974)
- Jesus on a Stick (1975)
- Ladybird in a Loony-bin (1977)
- F for Ferg (1980)
- The Slipstream (1983)

=== Short stories ===
- "The Last Word" (2022)
