= Oh No It's Selwyn Froggitt =

British TV sitcom (1974–1978)

- Created by: Roy Clarke (Pilot); Alan Plater (Series) from a concept by Bill Maynard
- Directed by: Derrick Goodwin (Pilot); Ronnie Baxter (Series)
- Starring: Bill Maynard; Megs Jenkins; Robert Keegan; Rosemary Martin; Lynda Baron; Richard Davies; Bill Dean; Harold Goodwin; Ray Mort
- Theme music composer: Bill Dean
- Country of origin: United Kingdom
- Original language: English
- No. of series: 4
- No. of episodes: 29

Production
- Producers: Derrick Goodwin (Pilot); Ronnie Baxter (Series)
- Running time: 30 minutes
- Production company: Yorkshire Television

Original release
- Network: ITV
- Release: 30 September 1974 – 17 October 1978

Oh No It's Selwyn Froggitt, known as Selwyn in its final series, is a British television sitcom that was first broadcast on ITV from 1974 to 1978. Initially created by Roy Clarke from a concept by Bill Maynard, most of the series was written by Alan Plater. Set in the fictional Yorkshire town of Scarsdale, it starred Maynard as Selwyn Froggitt, a hapless but good-natured council labourer, handyman and working men's club secretary.

The programme, produced by Yorkshire Television, employed slapstick humour as well as pathos and became a major ratings success; Froggitt's catchphrase "magic!" became widely known in the United Kingdom and Maynard emerged as a nationwide household name. It ran for four series, the last of which carried the title Selwyn and featured only Maynard reprising his role in the new location of a holiday camp.

== Plot ==
The first three series of Oh No It's Selwyn Froggitt are set in the fictional Yorkshire town of Scarsdale and centre on the bungling exploits of Selwyn Froggitt, a handyman and a council labourer. Bill Maynard described Froggitt, a burly, balding and good-natured man often clad in a donkey jacket, as "this naïve boy who never grew up". Froggitt has an urge to improve his life and that of everyone around him; he carries The Times and often tells people "there was an article about it in The Times" regarding subjects he has brought up. He lives with his put-upon mother (Megs Jenkins) and his brother Maurice (Robert Keegan), whose romance and eventual marriage to Vera Parkinson (initially played by Rosemary Martin, replaced by Lynda Baron for the second and third series) is sometimes subject to Selwyn's interference. A running gag is Froggitt's mother warning him "don't open that cupboard our Selwyn, things fall out!", to no avail.

Froggitt is on the committee of Scarsdale Working Men's Club and Institute, serving as concert secretary in charge of booking "turns". Froggitt's colleagues are the dour Scouser Jack (Bill Dean), Harry (Harold Goodwin) and excitable Welshman Clive (Richard Davies), often called Taff by Froggitt. All decisions taken by the club committee are taken on a "show of hands..." and "carried unanimously". Though clumsy and somewhat incompetent, Froggitt is honest and hard-working, unlike the other committee members, who usually sit back in comfort while Froggitt does the manual labour. They generally tolerate him because he is prepared to volunteer for unwanted tasks, and they sometimes mislead him for their own amusement. The club steward is Raymond (Ray Mort), often seen answering the telephone with a number of fictitious and fanciful addresses.

In the fourth and final series, the format of the show changed radically. This version of the programme, retitled Selwyn, featured only Maynard from the earlier series and had Froggitt become entertainments officer under the supervision of manager Mervyn Price (Bernard Gallagher) at the seedy Paradise Valley Holiday Camp.

== Cast ==
- Bill Maynard as Selwyn Froggitt
- Daphne Heard (pilot) and Megs Jenkins (series 1–3) as Mrs Froggitt
- David Lodge (pilot) and Robert Keegan (series 1–3) as Maurice Froggitt
- Rosemary Martin (series 1) and Lynda Baron (series 2–3) as Vera Parkinson
- Richard Davies as Clive Meredith (series 1–3)
- Bill Dean as Jack Bradshaw (series 1–3)
- Harold Goodwin as Harry Nicholson (series 1–3)
- Ray Mort as Raymond (series 1–3)
- Bernard Gallagher as Mervyn Price (series 4)

== Episodes ==
In total, 29 episodes of Oh No It's Selwyn Froggitt, including 7 under the title Selwyn, were produced.

=== Series overview ===
| Series | Episodes | Originally released | |
| Series | Episodes | First released | Last released |
|---|---|---|---|
| Pilot | 1 | 30 September 1974 | |
| 1 | 6 | 7 January 1976 | 11 February 1976 |
| 2 | 7 | 21 February 1977 | 4 April 1977 |
| 3 | 8 | 8 November 1977 | 27 December 1977 |
| 4 | 7 | 5 September 1978 | 17 October 1978 |

=== Pilot (1974) ===
The pilot and the first series were first released on DVD by Network on 25 May 2009.

| No. | Title | Written by | Original release date |
|---|---|---|---|
| 0 | "Oh No- It's Selwyn Froggit" | Roy Clarke | 30 September 1974 |

=== Series 1 (1976) ===
| No. | Title | Written by | Original release date |
|---|---|---|---|
| 1 | "Three Fifths of the World Loves a Lover" | Alan Plater | 7 January 1976 |
| 2 | "We Are the Masters Now" | Alan Plater | 14 January 1976 |
| 3 | "There Are Several Businesses Like Show Business" | Alan Plater | 21 January 1976 |
| 4 | "The Grand Outing" | Alan Plater | 28 January 1976 |
| 5 | "The Master Builder" | Alan Plater | 4 February 1976 |
| 6 | "Ladies' Desire" | Alan Plater | 11 February 1976 |

=== Series 2 (1977) ===
The second series was first released on DVD by Network on 7 September 2009.

| No. | Title | Written by | Original release date |
|---|---|---|---|
| 1 | "Daze of Hope" | Alan Plater | 21 February 1977 |
| 2 | "The Game of the Name" | Alan Plater | 28 February 1977 |
| 3 | "Raffles" | Alan Plater | 7 March 1977 |
| 4 | "Selwyn Rides Again" | Alan Plater | 14 March 1977 |
| 5 | "Alphabetic Orders" | Alan Plater | 21 March 1977 |
| 6 | "The Protection Racket" | Alan Plater | 28 March 1977 |
| 7 | "Just Cause and Impediment" | Alan Plater | 4 April 1977 |

=== Series 3 (1977) ===
The third series was first released on DVD by Network on 3 May 2010.

| No. | Title | Written by | Original release date |
|---|---|---|---|
| 1 | "Be It Ever So Humble, There's No Place" | Alan Plater | 8 November 1977 |
| 2 | "Gala Performance" | Mike Craig, Lawrie Kinsley and Ron McDonnell | 15 November 1977 |
| 3 | "Boom Boom" | Bernie Sharp | 22 November 1977 |
| 4 | "The Occupational Hazard" | Mike Craig, Lawrie Kinsley and Ron McDonnell | 29 November 1977 |
| 5 | "Sling Along with Selwyn" | Bernie Sharp | 6 December 1977 |
| 6 | "A Little Learning" | H. V. Kershaw | 13 December 1977 |
| 7 | "Around the Houses" | Alan Plater | 20 December 1977 |
| 8 | "On the Feast of Selwyn" | Mike Craig, Lawrie Kinsley and Ron McDonnell | 27 December 1977 |

=== Series 4 (1978) ===
The fourth series was first released on DVD by Network on 16 August 2010.

| No. | Title | Written by | Original release date |
|---|---|---|---|
| 1 | "The Road to Paradise Valley" | Lawrie Kinsley and Ron McDonnell | 5 September 1978 |
| 2 | "Wish You Were Here" | Lawrie Kinsley and Ron McDonnell | 12 September 1978 |
| 3 | "Better Never Than Late" | Richard Knight | 19 September 1978 |
| 4 | "Take a Tip from Selwyn" | Lawrie Kinsley and Ron McDonnell | 26 September 1978 |
| 5 | "I've Gotta Jockey" | Richard Knight | 3 October 1978 |
| 6 | "Don't Make Waves" | Jon Glover and Jeremy Nicholas | 10 October 1978 |
| 7 | "A Man for One Season" | Lawrie Kinsley and Ron McDonnell | 17 October 1978 |

== Production ==
=== Conception ===
Bill Maynard had the initial idea for the show, wishing to create a sitcom based around the members of the working men's club in his home village of Sapcote, Leicestershire. He later said "every character came from that club". Maynard modelled his lead character on Peter Wright, a larger-than-life patron who often exclaimed "magic!" with his thumbs up and ordered "a pint of cooking and a bag of nuts", both of which would become catchphrases of Maynard's character. Wright had arms too muscular to fold properly so he kept them high on his chest, another attribute Maynard borrowed. Maynard later commented "you couldn't dream up a character like Selwyn. In fact, I played him down."

Additionally, Maynard took inspiration from Shakespeare's A Midsummer Night's Dream, with Froggitt as Bottom and the committee at the working men's club as the mechanicals. Robert Keegan believed Maynard based Selwyn "on himself".

Maynard considered Froggitt's interest in reading The Times an important part of the character, explaining "I wanted him to be intelligent, always anxious to improve himself. The easy route would've been to use old clichés, like malapropisms and spoonerisms, but that would have made the character too one-dimensional. By getting him to read The Times and be an ardent student of dynamic word power, we gave him the breadth to spread the comedy over a wide range of subjects. We wanted people to laugh with him, not at him". The series often featured slapstick physical comedy. Maynard characterised Froggitt as someone who causes havoc simply due to "his tremendous enthusiasm and his willingness to help his fellow man", rather than "an idiot". He identified "a lot of drama and a certain amount of pathos" in the character.

=== Commission and writing ===
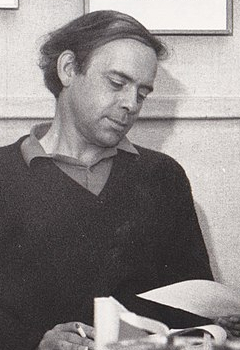
The series was Alan Plater's first sitcom.

Maynard attempted to get the programme commissioned by Duncan Wood during the latter's 1972–73 tenure as the BBC's Head of Comedy. Wood commissioned a pilot after he had moved to Yorkshire Television to be Head of Light Entertainment. Wood brought in Roy Clarke, the creator of Last of the Summer Wine, to write the pilot for the series. As Clarke felt he lacked the familiarity to write about a working men's club, Maynard took the train to Leeds to assist him. Clarke devised the title Oh No It's Selwyn Froggitt, and the pilot episode was transmitted on 30 September 1974 as part of a six-week season of Yorkshire Television comedy specials. This initial episode rendered Selwyn's surname as "Froggit".

The first series of Oh No It's Selwyn Froggitt was commissioned in September 1975, following the end of another sitcom starring Maynard, The Life of Riley. Feeling the pilot had been at odds with his original concept, the actor met again with Clarke to discuss the show's direction. According to Maynard, Clarke admitted he had found it difficult to write about situations he had not thought up himself and decided he was not right for the job. Maynard approached Alan Plater to take Clarke's place as writer, having worked with the playwright and screenwriter on Trinity Tales (1975). Plater was best known for writing television dramas including Shoulder to Shoulder (1974) and The Stars Look Down (1975); Oh No It's Selwyn Froggitt was his only foray into sitcom writing. Plater's involvement has been characterised as indicative of a maverick and prolific approach to television writing. He would later comment that Maynard had "a constitutional resistance to learning the script".

The second series episode "Daze of Hope", in which Selwyn believes he is to feature in an episode of This Is Your Life with Eamonn Andrews, was inspired by Maynard's own experience on the programme in 1974. The series employed little bawdy humour; Maynard said he received letters thanking him for "the cleanest show on television".

=== Filming and transmission ===
The regular cast of Oh No It's Selwyn Froggitt. Left to right from top row: Maurice (Robert Keegan), Selwyn (Bill Maynard), Mrs Froggitt (Megs Jenkins), Ray (Ray Mort), Clive (Richard Davies), Jack (Bill Dean) and Harry (Harold Goodwin).

Filming for the first series commenced in October 1975. It was mainly shot at Yorkshire Television Studios on Kirkstall Road, Leeds, whilst outdoor location filming for the series took place in Skelmanthorpe, West Yorkshire and Elvington, North Yorkshire. Bill Maynard's wife Muriel frequently attended dress rehearsals and recordings. Megs Jenkins, cast as Froggitt's mother, had initially considered herself the wrong fit for the role and resolved to approach the part straight. The programme's theme tune was written and composed by Bill Dean, who starred as Jack, and performed by the Tony Mansell Singers. The theme would feature different lyrics for each episode. On transmission, the series became a ratings success, topping the national weekly chart and eventually reaching peak viewing figures of 29 million. Froggitt became a cult figure, with his catchphrase "magic!" and thumbs-up becoming widely known in the United Kingdom.

Rosemary Martin, who played Maurice Froggitt's partner Vera, left the programme after its first series. Interviewed in July 1976, she stated "I was sick of playing silly, mindless women. And Selwyn Froggitt, although a very successful show, was one of the unhappiest jobs I have ever had. I left it thinking I must be a quarrelsome, bad tempered person who couldn't get on with anybody." Martin was replaced by Lynda Baron, who had recently appeared as Nurse Gladys Emmanuel in the first series of Open All Hours.

The second series topped the national ratings for four of the seven weeks it was on air. Interviewed during its run, Maynard described the second series as the last, saying the Froggitt role was "starting to take me over". Maynard was uncomfortable with the prospect of being typecast and refused to appear in character as Selwyn for public appearances. When starring in a pantomime production of Jack and the Beanstalk in Norwich, Maynard insisted his character be called "Simple Simon" rather than the scripted "Simple Selwyn". Maynard was signed to Waif Records as a singer and turned down several songs with Froggitt's catchphrase "magic" in the title. After the programme ended, Maynard wrote "Stock Car Racing is Magic", a self-released single credited to Vroom.

The immense popularity of Oh No It's Selwyn Froggitt led to the commissioning of a third series by June 1977. Alan Plater, who described both himself and Maynard as "knackered" after the previous run, agreed to return but only to write two episodes. Filming commenced on 5 September 1977, following Maynard's recovery from a slipped disc. A Christmas episode, "On the Feast of Selwyn", concluded the third series.

Maynard had considered the third series the last, but was persuaded by Duncan Wood to return for a new version of the programme, simply titled Selwyn. Maynard believed the programme had got into a rut and considered a new setting and supporting cast the best way to further develop his character. Maynard drew on his 1950s experience as a comedian at Butlin's for the holiday camp setting. Plater was not involved with this fourth series. Robert Keegan, who had played Maurice, considered the removal of the supporting cast a potential mistake "as I think viewers of situation comedy like to get to know lots of characters". A proposed fifth series was not produced after disappointing audience reactions. Maynard confirmed the series had finished in May 1980, telling the media "if you keep on with the same character all the time, people won't accept you as anything else. If I do [play Selwyn again], it will be when people have begun to forget about him."

== Reception and legacy ==
Following the transmission of the pilot episode in 1974, Terry Dwyer of the Leicester Mercury compared the character to Frank Spencer from the BBC1 sitcom Some Mothers Do 'Ave 'Em, commenting "he's another one-man disaster area, but unlike Frank has no feelings of inadequacy – just the reverse in fact. There's nothing he can not do and it was the exuberance and unshakeable optimism of the character that made last night's ITV comedy a lot of fun". During broadcast of the second series, Chris Watson of the Western Daily Press praised Maynard's performance but criticised the "inconsistent scripts and rather obvious humour", commenting "the amiable buffoon Selwyn Froggitt is currently the most popular character on TV, and that is a telling indictment of the current choice". Celia Andrews of the Western Daily Press praised "the touch of naivete" in Maynard's performance, describing Froggitt as "a sort of human Aunt Sally meeting life's slings and arrows with a maniacal laugh."

Reviewing the fourth series, Selwyn, Stafford Hildred of the Birmingham Evening Mail considered the axing of the supporting cast a mistake, commenting "now Mr. Maynard provides most of the humour himself, and the ration of laughs is spread very thin indeed". Clem Lewis of Birmingham Evening Mail felt Maynard "now hogs all the funny lines... all two of them per programme". Linton Mitchell of the Bristol Evening Post commented "the character does nothing for me at all – except to make me feel vaguely uneasy." In 2003, the Radio Times Guide to TV Comedy included Selwyn in a list of the worst British sitcoms ever produced.

Retrospectively, Oh No It's Selwyn Froggitt has been described as "a kind of Billy Liar for nutters" in The Guinness Book of Classic British TV. In 2010, Michael Coveney of The Guardian wrote that the series exhibited Alan Plater's "gift of writing supple, salty dialogue for working-class characters", as with Plater's scripts for Z-Cars and its sequel Softly, Softly. The series was an influence on Victoria Wood.

In August 1989, "Gala Performance" was repeated with a specially-recorded introduction by Maynard to celebrate Yorkshire Television's 21st anniversary. The series was regularly repeated on UK Gold between 1997 and 1999. Volumes of selected episodes from the series were released on VHS in the 1990s. Network released a boxset of the complete series on DVD on 11 October 2010.
