= Jewish Telegraph =

British Jewish newspaper

- Type: Weekly newspaper
- Format: Tabloid
- Owner: Jewish Telegraph Ltd
- Editor: Paul Harris
- Founded: 1950
- Language: English
- Headquarters: Manchester
- Website: jewishtelegraph.com

The Jewish Telegraph is a British Jewish newspaper. It was founded in December 1950 by Frank and Vivienne Harris, the parents of the current editor, Paul Harris.

== Founding ==
Frank and Vivienne Harris founded the newspaper in their dining room in Salford in December 1950. They started with £50 and a borrowed typewriter. Frank Harris was a London freelance journalist who, on his arrival in Manchester, noticed that its only Jewish newspaper was a freesheet. He determined to establish a paid for Jewish weekly.

== Expansion ==
Vivienne Harris oversaw the newspaper's expansion from 1950 to 2011. She established editions in Manchester, Leeds, Liverpool and Glasgow. In 1976, the Jewish Telegraph established a Leeds edition with its own editorial and advertising staff of nine, based in a local office. In 1981, the paper acquired the title of the monthly Liverpool Jewish Gazette, giving Merseyside its first Jewish weekly. The paper has its own editorial staff in Liverpool, based in offices at Harold House, the Liverpool Jewish Community Centre, which moved into the new King David Campus in September 2011. In June 1992, on the demise of the Glasgow Jewish Echo, the paper moved into Scotland within a week and began a weekly edition. A staff of four works from offices at the Glasgow Maccabi complex.

The latest addition was a website in December 1999, which is updated in the early hours of every Friday morning. The website's design has not been updated since its launch.

The paper is based in Park Hill, Bury Old Road in Prestwich.
