= Bob Keegan (actor) =

British film and television actor (1924–1988)

- Born: Robert Keegan; 3 December 1924; Liverpool, England
- Died: 16 January 1988 (aged 63); Manchester, England
- Years active: 1959–1987
- Spouse: Sally Miller (m. 1959)
- Children: 2

Robert Keegan (3 December 1924 – 16 January 1988) was a British film and television actor.

== Early life ==
Of Irish descent, Keegan served in the Second World War with the Royal Marines. Travelling all over the world with them, he got his first taste of showbusiness with them, helping behind the scenes running a concert party.

Returning home after the conflict, he discovered that most of his friends had either been killed or moved away. He took on a number of jobs, first becoming a lumberjack, running his own logging camp in North Wales with two friends. Further jobs included being a dock supervisor, tailor's cutter, credit salesman and railway fireman and driver but was not happy in any of these occupations.

In an effort to get him new friends, Keegan's sister persuaded him to join her amateur dramatic group. Soon, he was acting in plays, painting scenery and producing, realising that acting was the career he wanted to do. However, Keegan kept putting the opportunity off due to the economic situation at his home, looking after his mother and two sisters following the death of their father (a tram driver).

== Career ==
Eventually, at the age of 34, Keegan had the courage to take up the professional plunge. After playing at the Argyll Children's Theatre in Birkenhead, he went onto the Bolton repertory company. This was followed by being stage manager with the Manchester Library Theatre for 18 months, managing a group of Spanish dancers touring the country, becoming leading player with Oldham Coliseum Theatre and returning to the Manchester Library Theatre in 1960 as an actor.

He was known for his television roles, such as Doctor Who (where he played Sholakh in The Ribos Operation), Z-Cars (where he had a lengthy role as Sergeant Bob Blackitt), Softly, Softly (a Z-Cars spin-off, also as Blackitt), The First Lady, Under and Over, Beryl's Lot and Oh No It's Selwyn Froggitt. Keegan was also known for playing the role of "Harry Ware" in the 1971 film Straw Dogs.

== Personal life and death ==
While performing in and producing plays at Oldham Repertory, Keegan met Sally. She was a receptionist at a local opticians where he was borrowing glasses from when needed for characters in productions. They were soon married and moved to Esher with their children at the beginning of 1964. During the 1960s, the couple ran a donkey stud and animal agency, breeding horses and donkeys for show purposes. Unfortunately, while Keegan was away filming in Spain, an outbreak of equine flu wiped out the stock of 300 horses and donkeys, resulting in the business venture going bankrupt. After living in Croham Valley Road in Croydon for some time, the couple moved to Blackrod as a result of his acting work.

In 1986, Keegan defied doctors' orders to enter hospital immediately for a lung operation so that he could fulfil a commitment at the Octagon Theatre, Bolton, playing Polonius in Hamlet. The day after the run ended, he was rushed to Wythenshawe Hospital to undergo major surgery for cancer, having three-quarters of his left lung removed. The actor soon returned to work but the cancer spread to his brain, resulting in him forgetting things and people, as well as having sudden outbursts of temper. Admitted to St Ann's Hospice, he died in January 1988 at the age of 63.

Prior to passing away, Keegan asked his wife to pay back the hospice for the care they had provided for him. As a result, she set up the Robert Keegan Appeal Fund and began fundraising to pay for a new day centre. This involved holding charity events with actors from Coronation Street, Emmerdale Farm, Brookside and Bread taking part to help the cause. After £30,000 was raised, the Robert Keegan Room was opened in March 1992 at the hospice as a permanent memorial to the actor.
