= James Ellis (actor) =

Northern Irish actor (1931–2014)

- Born: 15 March 1931; Belfast, Northern Ireland
- Died: 8 March 2014 (aged 82); Lincoln, England
- Occupation: Actor
- Years active: 1952–2014
- Spouses: Beth Ellis (divorced); Robina Ellis (m. 1976)
- Children: 4

James Ellis (15 March 1931 – 8 March 2014) was a Northern Irish actor and theatre director from Belfast who had a career stretching over sixty years. Originally a stage actor and director in his native city, he moved to London in the early 1960s. After gaining recognition in Great Britain through the Z-Cars (1962–78) police series on BBC1, he appeared in many other television and film roles. He was also a translator.

== Early life ==
Jimmy Ellis was born in Belfast where he attended Methodist College. He later studied at Queen's University Belfast and trained at the Bristol Old Vic Theatre School.

== Career ==
Ellis began to act with the Belfast-based Ulster Group Theatre in 1952. He first appeared in a revival of the Louis D'Alton play They Got What They Wanted (1947). Ellis became established as the company's young male lead in such plays as April in Assagh, where he was cast as McFettridge (1954), Is the Priest at Home? as O'Grady (1954), and The Diary of Anne Frank as Peter van Daan (1957).

While continuing as an actor in the main company, he also undertook the management of the group's summer theatre in the port town of Larne, north of Belfast. Ellis' most important roles for the group included the lead figure of Christy Mahon in a production of J.M. Synge's The Playboy of the Western World in 1957.

In December 1958 Ellis had been appointed the Group Theatre's Director of Productions. However, he resigned this position in July 1959 to direct Sam Thompson's controversial play Over the Bridge (1960), which had been withdrawn from production in rehearsals after the Group's board deemed the play too inflammatory. It was subsequently staged by a group of actors and directors who had quit the Group Theatre in protest over the board's decision.

Ellis soon left Northern Ireland for London, where his first break came when he was cast as Dandy Jordan in the BBC TV production of Stewart Love's The Randy Dandy, which aired on 14 September 1961. It was an "Angry" play deemed so controversial and sexually charged that the BBC gave a warning before the transmission that it was "unsuitable for people of a nervous disposition".

His success as Dandy made him a sought-after actor and led to subsequent roles with the BBC and ITV, including as Philip in the BBC production of Stewart Love's The Sugar Cube (transmitted 21 June 1961) and ultimately his role as Bert Lynch in Z-Cars (1962–78). In this police series, set in the fictional Newtown in Lancashire, his character rose from the rank of PC to Inspector over the series' run. Ellis appeared in 629 episodes of this series, an all-time record for any actor's appearances in a TV detective/police series. The impact of Z-Cars was such that he became a household name in this era. In addition he appeared in a January 1967 episode of the Z-Cars spin-off Softly, Softly ("Barlow Was There: Part 3: Mischief"), which reunited the now DC Lynch with his former Newtown colleagues, Barlow (Stratford Johns), Watt (Frank Windsor) and Blackitt (Robert Keegan).

From 1982, he portrayed Norman Martin, the violent and troubled father of Billy, in the "Billy" trilogy of plays by Graham Reid, all of which were broadcast as part of the Play for Today series. The first of the plays, Too Late to Talk to Billy, was followed by A Matter of Choice for Billy (1983) and A Coming to Terms for Billy (1984). A postscript to the trilogy, Lorna, was broadcast in 1987. In the mid-1980s Ellis was a member of the team of interviewers on "Afternoon Plus", produced by Thames Television.

He appeared in Till Death Us Do Part, Doctor Who, In Sickness and in Health, Ballykissangel, Playing the Field, One By One and the cult sitcom Nightingales, with Robert Lindsay and David Threlfall.

In Antonia Bird's Priest (1994), from a screenplay by Jimmy McGovern, he played Father Ellerton. Ellis also contributed cameos to popular series such as Boys from the Blackstuff by Alan Bleasdale, Only Fools and Horses, The Bill, Casualty, Boon, Common as Muck, Birds of a Feather, Lovejoy and Heartbeat.

He was the subject of This Is Your Life in 2001 when he was surprised by Michael Aspel.

Ellis was also a writer of poems and prose and a translator. The BBC broadcast a selection of his adaptations from French in 2007. In July 2008, Queen's University Belfast awarded Ellis an honorary doctorate as part of its centenary celebrations.

== Selected filmography ==
Year	Title	Role	Notes
1958	The Adventures of Robin Hood	Thin Man	Episode: "The Healing Hand"
1959	Armchair Theatre	Stephen Quinn	Episode: "A Shilling for the Evil Day"
1961	Randy Dandy	Dandy Jordan	TV Film
1961	ITV Play of the Week	Archie Prior	Episode: "Over the Bridge"
1962 – 1978	Z-Cars	PC Bert Lynch/ Det. Con. Bert Lynch/ Sgt. Lynch/ Inspector Lynch	629 episodes
1966	Emergency Ward 10	Turvey	Episode: "The Long Small Hours"
1966	The Scales of Justice	Bill Kenton	Episode: "The Haunted Man"
1966	Where the Bullets Fly	Flight Lieutenant Fotheringham	Film
1967	Softly, Softly	Sgt. Lynch	Episode: "Barlow Was There" (Part 3: Mischief)
1975	Till Death Us Do Part	Police Sergeant	Episode: "Drunk In Charge of a Bicycle"
1980	High Rise Donkey	Policeman	Film
1982	Boys from the Blackstuff	Wino	Episode: "Yosser's Story"
1982	The Chinese Detective	Father Gorman	Episode: "Pasts"
1982 – 1984	Play for Today	Norman Martin	3 episodes
1984	Hammer House of Mystery and Suspense	Father Dowd	Episode: "Mark of the Devil"
1984	Tripper's Day	The Grazer	Episode: "Special Offers"
1984 – 1987	One by One	Paddy Reilly	32 episodes
1985	Big Deal	O' Connor	Episode: "The Rabbit and the Hare"
1985	No Surrender	Paddy Burke	Film
1986	The Practice	Walter Petitt	4 episodes
1987	Boon	James McGillivray	Episode: "Fiddler Under the Roof"
1987	Lorna	Norman Martin	TV Film
1987	The Marksman	Doyle	2 episodes (TV mini-series)
1987 – 1996	Screen Two	Mr. McCoy/ Albert McVea/ Andrew Carson	3 episodes
1988	All in Good Faith	Norman	Episode: "Behold a Pale Rider"
1988	Troubles	Murphy	2 episodes (TV mini-series)
1989	All Creatures Great and Small	Roddy Travers	Episode: "In Whom We Trust"
1989	Doctor Who	Peter Walmsley	Serial: "Battlefield" (3 episodes)
1989	Hard Cases	Mr. Ainsley	Episode #2.4
1990	Boon	Thomas O'Rouke	Episode: "Rival Eyes"
1990	Little Sir Nicholas	Penfold	3 episodes
1990 – 1993	Nightingales	Sarge	13 episodes
1991	So You Think You've Got Troubles?	Charlie Adamson	6 episodes
1991	Woof!	Mr. Fitzherbert	Episode #3.5
1992	In Sickness and in Health	Michael	7 episodes
1992	Perfect Scoundrels	Joe Deegan	Episode: "The Long Way Home"
1993	Lovejoy	Niall Sheehan	Episode: "Never Judge a Book by Its Cover"
1994	Common as Muck	Walter	Episode: "Supercrew at the Job Centre"
1994	The Detectives	Customs Officer	Episode: "Dutch Cops"
1994	Priest	Father Ellerton	Film
1995	Leapin' Leprachauns!	Patrick	Film
1995	The Near Room	Pat	Film
1995	Oliver's Travels	Ned	Episode: "Land of My Fathers"
1996	Accused	George Sullivan	Episode: "George"
1996	Spellbreaker: Secret of the Leprachauns	Patrick	Film
1997	Mike and Angelo	Harry Andrews	Episode: "Jitterbugs"
1998	Birds of a Feather	Father Collins	Episode: "Holy Ground"
1998	Noah's Ark	George Williams	Episode: "Deep Waters"
1998	Resurrection Man	Ivor Coppingham	Film
1998 – 1999	Ballykissangel	Uncle Minto	4 episodes
1998 – 2002	Playing the Field	Mr. Mullen	26 episodes
1999	Big Bad World	Vincent Dempsey	3 episodes
1999	Dragonworld: The Legend Continues	McCoy	TV Film
2000	Sunburn	Charles Clough	Episode #2.6
2001	Casualty	Brian O'Connor	Episode: "Girl Power"
2002	Only Fools and Horses	George Parker	Episode: "Strangers on the Shore"
2003	Conspiracy of Silence	Jim O'Brien	Film
2004	The Bill	Brian Webber	Episode: "A Different Kind of Justice"
2004	Casualty	Reg	Episode: "The Ties that Bind Us" (2 episodes)
2004	Heartbeat	Bagger/ Winston Parker	Episode: "Double Trouble"
2005	Down to Earth	Lenny Scott	Episode: "Tall Tales"
2012	Eternal Law	Joe Barlow	Episode #1.3

== Personal life ==
Ellis' first marriage was to actress Beth Ellis with whom he had three children, Amanda, Adam and Hugo. They divorced in the late 1960s. In 1976 Ellis married his second wife, Robina, by whom he had another son, Toto. Adam was murdered in London in August 1988. The murderer was sentenced to life imprisonment in 1989. Hugo, who followed his father into professional acting and directing, died by suicide in January 2011, aged 49.

== Death ==
Ellis died of a stroke on 8 March 2014 in Lincoln, aged 82. He is interred in Castlereagh Presbyterian Churchyard in Belfast.

== Legacy ==
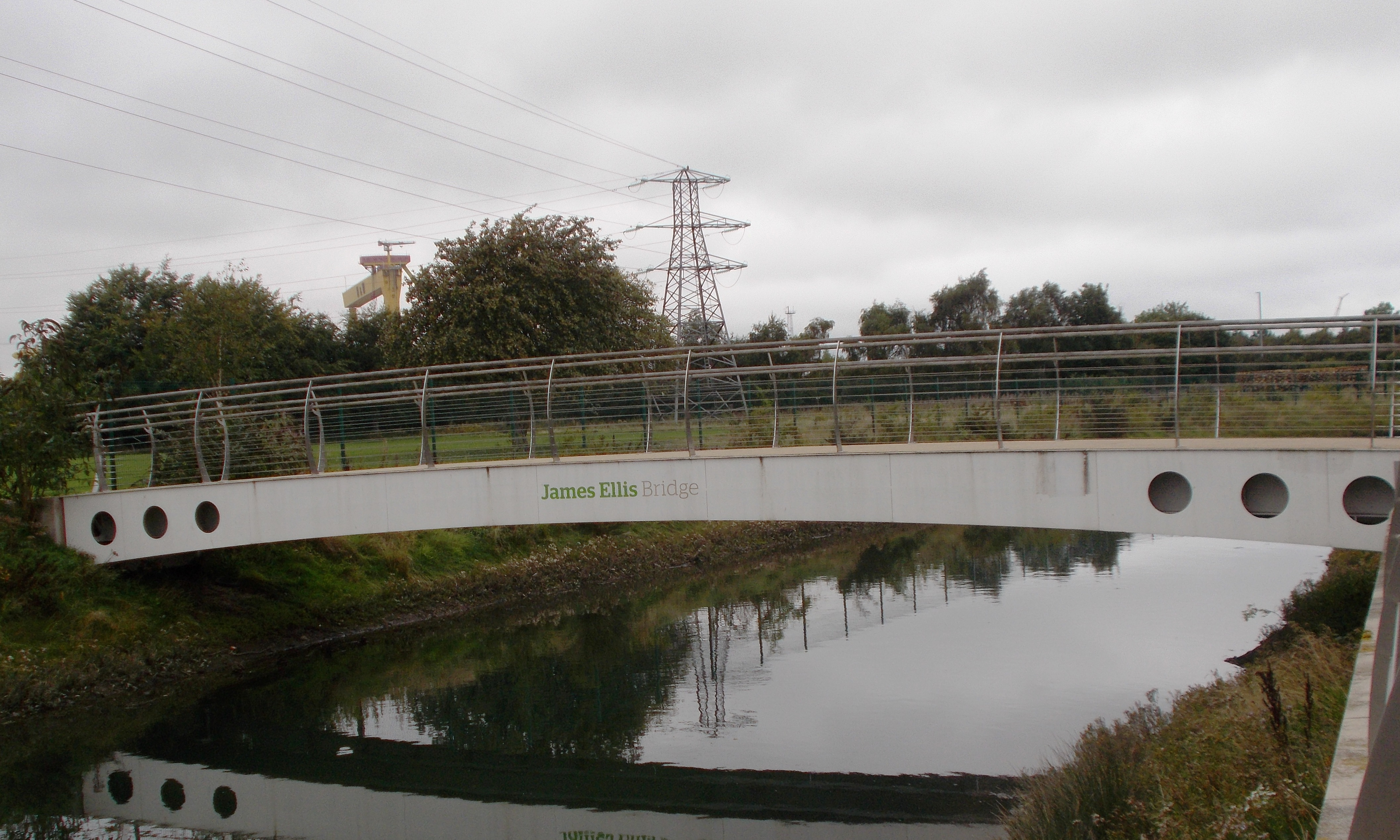
James Ellis Bridge

The James Ellis Bridge in East Belfast, on a route between CS Lewis Square and Victoria Park, was opened in March 2017 by his widow Robina, three years after Ellis' death.
