= Under and Over =

1971 BBC television sitcom

Under and Over is a 1971 BBC television sitcom, that lasted one series of six episodes.

In it The Bachelors, an Irish singing trio, play Irish labourers working on the construction of a new London Underground line.

Bob Keegan played Lord Brentwood, the boss of the construction company, who was also Irish.

It centres on culture clashes between Irish and British people, and the ambiguous position of people of Irish background in Britain.
