= Lynn C. Doyle =

Irish short story writer and playwright

Leslie Alexander Montgomery (5 October 1873 - 13 August 1961), better known by his pen name Lynn C. Doyle, was an Irish humourist and playwright.

Montgomery was born in Downpatrick, Co. Down. He wrote about his early rural life in An Ulster Childhood (1921). He was sent away to boarding school in the Educational Institute, Dundalk Co. Louth. He left school at 16 to work at the Northern Banking Company in Belfast and transferred as manager to Skerries, County Dublin, where he worked for 28 years.

Montgomery took his pen name ‘Lynn C. Doyle’ from a bottle of linseed oil he saw in a grocer's shop. His first volume of stories, Ballygullion, a humorous caricature of Ulster life set in a fictional town, was published in 1908. This proved popular and ran into several volumes.

Montgomery was also a playwright. His comedy, Love and Land was produced in London and other plays were performed by the Ulster Literary Theatre.

A sculpture group on Scotch Street, Downpatrick, contains a dog which represents The Silent Dog, one of Montgomery's short stories.

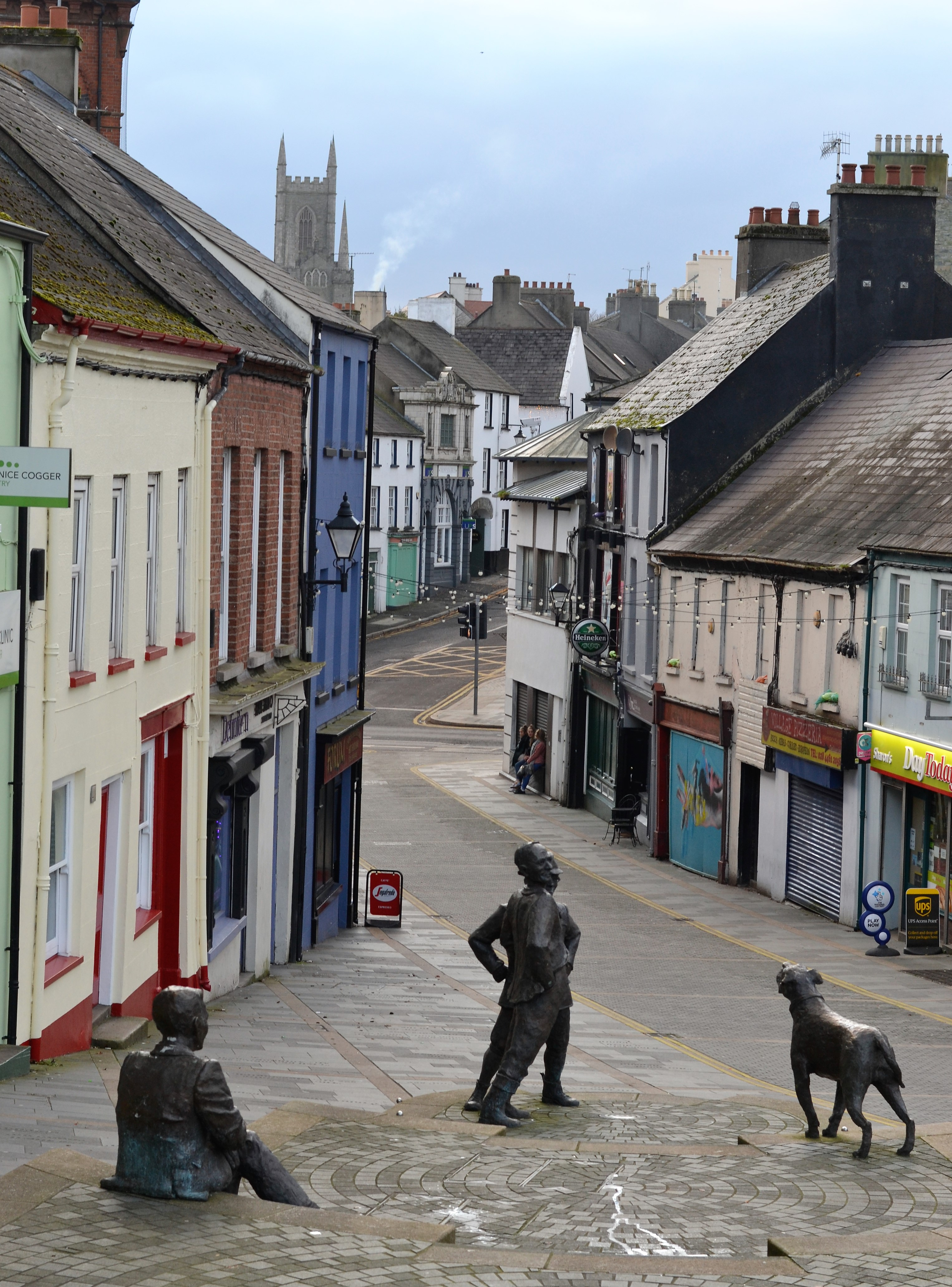
Sculpture group on Scotch Street
