= Sam Thompson (playwright) =

Northern Irish playwright (1916–1965)

Sam(uel) Thompson (21 May 1916 – 15 February 1965) was a Northern Irish playwright best known for his controversial plays Over the Bridge, which exposes sectarianism, and Cemented with Love, which focuses on political corruption. His works fall into the social realist genre but are distinct in their dramatisation of Northern Irish issues; they were ground-breaking in documenting sectarian violence before the eruption of the Troubles.

== Life ==
Born and educated in a working-class Protestant area in Ballymacarrett, Belfast, Thompson was the seventh of eight children of a lamp-lighter and part-time sexton of St Clement's Church. He spent most of his working life as a painter in the Belfast shipyards, starting aged 14 at Harland and Wolff and working for Belfast Corporation after the Second World War, and much of his writing draws on these experiences.

Thompson was a lifelong socialist and a committed trades unionist; he became a shop steward at the Belfast Corporation. His opposition to sectarian discrimination was to cost him his job. He stood unsuccessfully for parliament as the Labour party candidate for the rural South Down constituency in 1964.

He married May Thompson in 1947. He suffered a heart attack in June 1961, dying suddenly from a second heart attack in 1965, and is buried in Belfast City Cemetery.

== Writing ==
Thompson was encouraged to begin writing for radio in 1955, aged 39, by novelist and radio producer Sam Hanna Bell, who overheard him telling stories of shipyard life in a pub. His first piece, the radio documentary feature Brush in Hand about shipyard apprenticeship, was broadcast on BBC Northern Ireland in 1956.

Several radio plays and documentary features for the BBC were to follow. Tommy Baxter, Shopsteward (1957) focuses on discrimination against a trades union official by the management, while The General Foreman (1958) takes on the difficult role of the foreman mediating between management and the workforce. The autobiographical piece The Long Back Street (1959) describes poverty and sectarian violence during Thompson's early life in Ballymacarrett. He became a full-time playwright and actor in 1959.

His later works for radio include the documentary A Bed for the Night in which he interviews inmates of a Belfast hostel for the homeless, and the serial The Fairmans: Life in a Belfast Working Family (1960–61).

=== Over the Bridge ===
The stage play Over the Bridge, Thompson's best-known work, charts the tragic course of a sectarian dispute in the shipyard. Thompson offered the play to James Ellis, then director of the Ulster Group Theatre, early in 1958, reportedly saying "I got a play you wouldn't touch with a bargepole!" Ellis accepted it, and rehearsals had already started for a production in April 1959 when the theatre's board of directors headed by J. Ritchie McKee refused to produce the play, criticising it in the Belfast Telegraph as "full of grossly vicious phrases and situations which would undoubtedly offend and affront every section of the public" and stating "It is the policy of the directors of the Ulster Group Theatre to keep political and religious controversies off our stage." Ellis and many actors of the Ulster Group Theatre resigned to form their own company, and Thompson successfully sued the Board for breach of contract.

Over the Bridge finally opened at the Empire Theatre in Belfast on 26 January 1960, directed by Ellis and starring J. G. Devlin, Joseph Tomelty and Harry Towb; Thompson played one of the minor roles. It was highly successful, with an estimated total audience of 42,000 people during the six-week run, far greater than had attended any play in the city previously. On tour, Over the Bridge enjoyed considerable success in Dublin and Glasgow, and also played in Edinburgh, Brighton and the London West End. The play was later adapted for television by Granada with additional material by Hugh Leonard and for radio by the BBC in Belfast.

Ten years after its production, Sam Hanna Bell wrote that "at last the unclean spirit of sectarianism had been dragged before the floodlights and examined with passion, pity and corrosive laughter". Later critics also consider the play to have been ground-breaking; James McAleavey considers Over the Bridge and the controversy surrounding its staging to be "a landmark in the cultural history of Northern Ireland and ... prophetic of the Troubles to follow;" Michael Parker describes it as "a potent example of a text which illuminates the condition of the culture that frames it" and adds "the story of its reception provides incontrovertible evidence of the unease within the Unionist establishment during this period;" while Lance Pettitt calls the play "a powerful indictment of the failure of labour politics against religious fundamentalism".

Thompson's second stage play, The Evangelist (1963) is based on the religious revival in Ulster of 1859 and focuses on the exploitation of evangelism; it proved neither as controversial nor as successful as Over the Bridge.

=== Cemented with Love ===
The television play Cemented with Love saw a return to controversy: a black comedy which deals with corrupt electoral practices including bribery, gerrymandering and personation, the play lambasts both Unionist and Nationalist parties. Intended for broadcast during the 1964 general election year, it was repeatedly postponed due to protests from the BBC in Belfast. After a campaign led by the producer from BBC London, Cemented with Love finally appeared in May 1965 as part of The Wednesday Play series, a few months after Thompson's death. It was adapted as a stage play in 1966 by Tomás MacAnna.

Thompson had completed a draft of a further stage play, The Masquerade, set in London, before his death.

== Blue plaque ==
On 26 January 2010, a blue plaque was unveiled at Montrose Street South, Ballymacarrett, Belfast, the location of the house playwright Sam Thompson was born in, on the 50th anniversary of the first performance of his controversial play Over The Bridge.

== Bridge ==
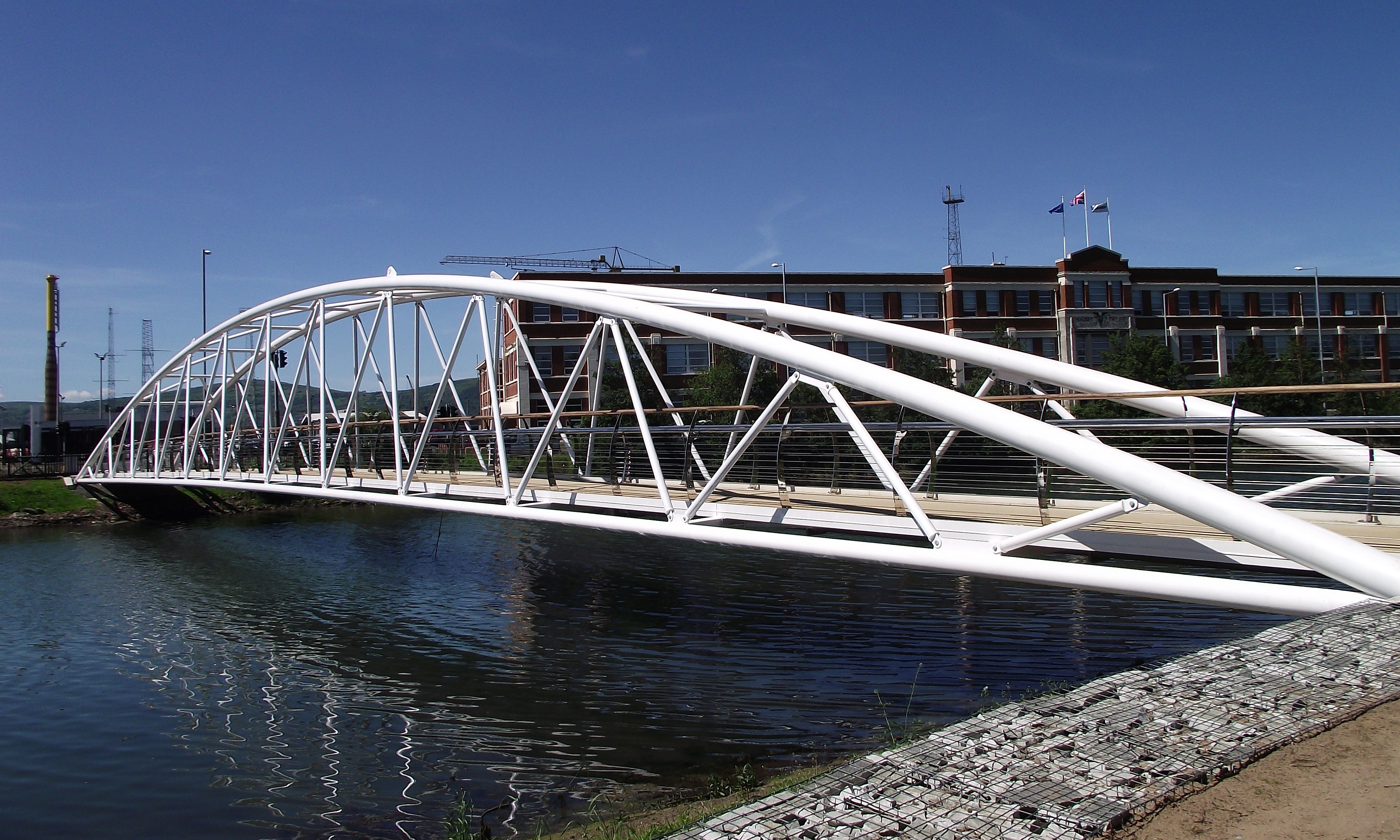
Sam Thompson Bridge, Victoria Park, Belfast

On 10 October 2013 the Connswater Community Greenway announced that the new landmark bridge linking Victoria Park to the old shipyards in East Belfast was to be named the Sam Thompson Bridge. The name was chosen from a shortlist of five by popular vote with Sam Thompson being the preferred choice of 44% of those that took part. This £500,000 bridge is part of the plans from the local Connswater Community Greenway project, who are building a £35 million greenway in east Belfast. The campaign had attracted the support of a number of high-profile people, including Cllr Claire Hanna (SDLP)

== Works ==
=== Stage plays ===
- Over the Bridge (1957)
- The Evangelist (1963)
- The Masquerade (not produced)

=== Television plays ===
- Cemented with Love (1965)
- The Teabreakers (unknown)

=== Radio ===
- Brush in Hand (1956)
- Tommy Baxter, Shopsteward (1957)
- The Island Men
- The General Foreman (1958)
- The Long Back Street (1959)
- The Fairmans: Life in a Belfast Working Family (1960–61)
- A Bed for the Night
