= Chinese Whispers (novella) =

1987 novella by Maurice Leitch

- First edition cover
- Author: Maurice Leitch
- Publisher: Arrow Books
- Publication date: November 3, 1988
- ISBN: 978-0-099-53750-2

Chinese Whispers is a 1987 novella by Maurice Leitch published as a Hutchinson Novella in Australia and the United Kingdom and as part of the Harper Short Novel Series in the United States. Chinese Whispers was filmed as a BBC Two television drama for the ScreenPlay series in 1989, directed by Stuart Burge, with a screenplay by Maurice Leitch, and featuring Niall Buggy in the leading role of Kenny.
