= Moya Cole Hospice =

English hospice

Moya Cole Hospice (formally St Ann's Hospice), is a charity in Greater Manchester, England, providing palliative care.

It was established in 1971 on the initiative of Dr Moya Cole from the Christie Hospital, Manchester. It now runs two centres: Moya Cole Hospice Heald Green and Moya Cole Hospice, Little Hulton. On 3 July 2025 it announced its plan to change its name from St Ann's Hospice to the Moya Cole Hospice in October 2025, which was actioned as planned.

Like most hospices in the UK, it is largely funded by voluntary donations. About a third of its funding is provided by the NHS, so has to raise around £20,000 a day to keep the hospices open.

In 2014 the organisation abandoned national NHS payscales and set up its own.
