= Clare Cathcart =

Actress from Northern Ireland

- Born: 2 October 1965; Bellanaleck, County Fermanagh, Northern Ireland, UK
- Died: 4 September 2014 (aged 48); Brighton, East Sussex, England, UK
- Occupation: Actress
- Known for: Mrs Torpy

Clare Cathcart (2 October 1965 – 4 September 2014) was a Northern Irish actress on stage and in film, radio, and television.

== Early life and education ==
Cathcart was born in Bellanaleck, County Fermanagh, the daughter of Arthur Cathcart and Doreen Cathcart. Her parents owned a restaurant. She attended Enniskillen Collegiate Grammar School, and trained for an acting career at Royal Holloway.

== Career ==
She was known for her appearances in Coronation Street, New Tricks and Call the Midwife, in which she played Mrs Torpy. Cathcart also appeared in the TV programmes Lost Belongings, Holby City, Goodnight Sweetheart, Come Fly with Me, Doctors, The Bill, Casualty, Safe and Sound, and Searching. "I was cast for my cleavage for the first three years of my career," she told a newspaper in 1995.

Cathcart's film appearances include Hotel Splendide, Up on the Roof and in 1999 Maeve Murphy's Salvage. She worked on some radio dramas, including Nun Climbs Tree in 1994, and The Law of Diminishing Returns in 2003.

On stage, Cathcart appeared in The Duchess of Malfi in Manchester in 1989, as a "luscious Beatrice" in The Venetian Twins at Oxford in 1993, in Brian Friel's Aristocrats in 2000, in Gary Mitchell's Loyal Women in 2003, and in The Comedy of Errors at the National Theatre, directed by Dominic Cooke. Her last appearance onstage was in Kathy Burke's production of Mary J O'Malley's Once a Catholic at the Tricycle Theatre, London in 2013.

== Personal life ==
Cathcart had two daughters with actor John Marquez. She died at her home in Brighton, on 4 September 2014, at the age of 48, from an asthma attack.
