= Sam Hanna Bell =

Irish novelist, short story writer, playwright, and broadcaster

Sam Hanna Bell (16 October 1909 – 9 February 1990) was a Scottish-born Northern Irish novelist, short story writer, playwright, and broadcaster.

== Early life ==
Bell was born in Glasgow to Ulster Scots parents. Following the sudden death of his father in 1918, he was brought at the age of seven to live near Raffery in the Strangford Lough area of County Down. He lived with his mother and two brothers in a cottage with no electricity or running water. This was the setting of his acclaimed novel of Ulster rural life, December Bride (1951). He moved to Belfast in 1921, where he worked at a variety of manual jobs before securing a post with the BBC in 1945. He was a co-founder of the left-leaning literary journal, Lagan, in 1943.

== Writing career ==
His first collection of short stories, Summer Loanen and Other Stories, was published in 1943. His novels include December Bride (1951), The Hollow Ball (1961), A Man Flourishing (1973) and Across the Narrow Sea (1987).

Bell was recruited to the BBC, in 1946, along with fellow writer, W R Rodgers, by poet and radio producer, Louis MacNeice. (Sean MacMahon, 1999, Sam Hannah Bell: a biography, Belfast: The Blackstaff Press, page 44). Some of his work as a radio producer was highly innovative. This is Northern Ireland, An Ulster Journey (1949) is a classic radio feature incorporating actuality, poetry, music and narration. in later work Hanna Bell incorporated the voices of 'ordinary people' in his attempt to paint a picture of Ulster as rooted in the lives and traditions of its people. His collaboration with W R Rodgers, The Return Room (1955) is one of the most important post-war Irish radio features and shows the influence of Dylan Thomas on Rodgers the poet.

Along with his BBC colleague John Boyd, the essayist (and anti-Partition activist) Denis Ireland, actors Joseph Tomelty and J. G. Devlin, poets John Hewitt and Robert Greacen, and the Rev Arthur Agnew, in the 1940s Bell was one of an intellectual set, "the club of ten" Linen Hall Library members that used to meet weekly next to the library in Campbell's cafe.

In 1977, he was honoured with an MBE in recognition of his contribution to the cultural life of Northern Ireland.

== Film adaptation ==
December Bride was made into an acclaimed film in 1990. Reviewing the film, Irish Times columnist and literary critic Fintan O'Toole said it was "not just a remarkable artistic achievement, but also a remarkable political one...restoring a richness and complexity to a history that has been deliberately narrowed". In April 1999, December Bride was selected by award-winning novelist and critic Colm Tóibín and publisher, writer and critic Dame Carmen Callil, for inclusion in The Modern Library: The 200 Best Novels in English Since 1950 (Picador).

== Death ==
Sam Hanna Bell died at 190 King's Road, Knock, Belfast, aged 80, shortly before the premiere of the film of December Bride. On 15 October 2009, the eve of what would have been Bell's centenary, a blue plaque was unveiled by Northern Ireland Culture Minister Nelson McCausland on the Belfast house where Bell had written December Bride. (Such plaques are erected to commemorate and honour notable people.)
