= J. G. Devlin =

Northern Irish actor (1907–1991)

J.G. Devlin
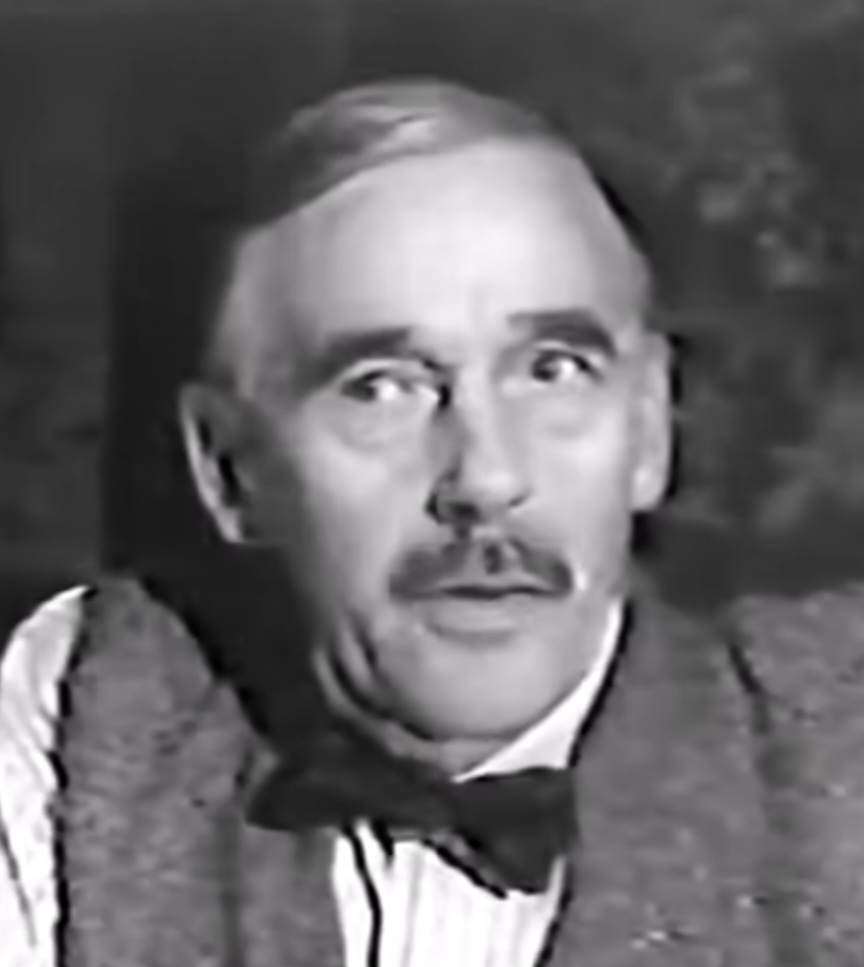
- Devlin in an episode of One Step Beyond (1961)
- Born: James Gerard Devlin; 8 October 1907; Belfast, Ireland
- Died: 17 October 1991 (aged 84); Belfast, Northern Ireland
- Occupation: Actor
- Years active: 1955–1991

James Gerard Devlin (8 October 1907 – 17 October 1991) was a Northern Irish actor who made his stage debut in 1931, and had long association with the Ulster Group Theatre. In a career spanning nearly sixty years, he played parts in TV productions such as Z-Cars, Dad's Army, The New Avengers and Bread. He also guest starred, alongside Leonard Rossiter, in an episode of Steptoe and Son, "The Desperate Hours". The writers of Steptoe and Son – Ray Galton and Alan Simpson – later said Devlin was second choice to play the part of Albert Steptoe in the series, behind Wilfrid Brambell. He also appeared as Father Dooley, a Catholic priest, in several episodes of Carla Lane's Bread, his last television appearance.

In 1969, he was in the Abbey Theatre production of Macook's Corner. where he played the part of Neal Macook.

In 1956, he appeared in a play by Irish playwright Teresa Deevy "Light Falling" where he played the part of Pat Scully, this was produced by Jack MacGowran in the Lyric Theatre (Hammersmith) as an 'opener' for Seán O'Casey play "The Shadow of a Gunman"

In 1978, he had a small part in the Thames Television / Euston Films Drama The Sweeney (Season 4, Episode 5, 'Nightmare'), playing 'Hay' a handyman in an antique dealers yard. The yard owner was a former IRA operative.

He was Vivian Stanshall's personal choice for the role of Old Scrotum, the Wrinkled Retainer in the Charisma Films version of Sir Henry at Rawlinson End, released in 1980.

== Early life ==
Devlin was born at 35 Waterville Street, Belfast, the eldest child of labourer Edward Devlin and Isabella Hamill. He had three younger sisters, Rose, Kathleen and Isabella.

== Filmography ==
Year	Title	Role	Notes
1955	Captain Lightfoot	Tuer O'Brien	Film debut
1956	Jacqueline	Mr. Lord's Servant	
1957	The Rising of the Moon	Moran	(as Players from the Abbey Theatre Company)
1959	Darby O'Gill and the Little People	Tom Kerrigan	
1960	A Terrible Beauty	Const. Lauden	
1961	The Big Gamble	The Driving Instructor	
1961	The Frightened City	Informer	
1961	Johnny Nobody	Caretaker	
1961	Attempt to Kill	Elliott	Edgar Wallace Mysteries episode.
1961	One Step Beyond	Leo	Episode: Eyewitness
1962	I Thank a Fool	Coroner	
1963	A Place to Go	Neighbour	Uncredited
1964	The Comedy Man	Gus Sloppitt	
1967	The Caper of the Golden Bulls	The Tinker	
1969	Guns in the Heather	Muldoon	
1969	The Reckoning	Cocky Burke	
1970	Dad's Army	Patrick Regan	Episode: Absent Friends
1972	Innocent Bystanders	Waiter	
1972	The Alf Garnett Saga	Irishman	Uncredited
1972	Steptoe and Son	Frank Ferris	The Desperate Hours, Series 7 episode 7
1980	The Outsider	Sean Tweeny	
1980	Sir Henry at Rawlinson End	Old Scrotum	
1985	Taggart	Bill Lynch	3 episodes
1985	No Surrender	George Gorman	
1988	The Raggedy Rawney	Jake	
1991	The Miracle	Mr. Beausang	
1992	Far and Away	Villager #1	Final film

== Playography ==
- Pat Scully in Light Falling (1956)
- Neal Macook in Macook's Corner 1969 (Abbey)
