= Papelucho and the Martian =

- Movie poster for Papelucho and the Martian
- Directed by: Alejandro Rojas
- Written by: Papelucho and the Martian by Marcela Paz
- Starring: Marina Huerta; Leyla Rangel; Carlos del Campo; Cecilia Gómez; Maggie Vera; Nayelí Solis; Ana Paula Fogarty; Adrián Fogarty; Mario Castañeda
- Music by: Pablo Avila Champín
- Production companies: Cine Animadores; Canal 13 Films
- Release date: May 17, 2007
- Running time: 77 minutes
- Country: Chile
- Language: Spanish

Papelucho and the Martian (Spanish: Papelucho y el Marciano) is a 2007 Chilean animated science fiction film, created by Cine Animadores and Canal 13 Films, released on May 17, 2007.

The film was directed by Alejandro Rojas Téllez and written by Arif Ali Shah and Mónica Ríos and features Marina Huerta as Papelucho, and Leyla Rangel as Det.

The movie is based on the original Chilean novel books Papelucho created in 1947 by Marcela Paz and is loosely based on the ninth book of the series, Papelucho and the Martian. It was Canal 13 Films' first animated film.

== Plot ==
Excited to learn everything about Martians, Papelucho sets out to catch one using his experiments. One day, he is surprised to find an actual Martian named Det, a curious Martian child, and without thinking, Det introduces himself to Papelucho by entering his body.

Papelucho and Det establish a deep friendship as they live together inside Papelucho's veins. However, Papelucho realizes that Det cannot continue living on Earth and needs to return to Mars. To help Det get home, Papelucho decides to build a spaceship to fly to Mars and bring his friend back home, without knowing what will happen to him once they arrive.

== Voice Cast ==
- Marina Huerta as Papelucho, an optimistic and creative 8-year old boy who wants to discover a real-life Martian. He is also good at creating strange inventions and experiments as an "inventor".
- Leyla Rangel as Det (short for Dermonic Ectodermal Transcriptionist II), a curious, trouble making green Martian who left Mars because he finds it boring. He eventually forms a bond with Papelucho as best friends throughout the film.
- Adrián Fogarty as Choclo, Papelucho's loyal pet dog.
- Cecilia Gomez as Tita, a mean girl who is interested in Papelucho's experiments, because she wants to be a scientist and knows a lot about the planet Mars. She eventually becomes friends with Papelucho near the end to help him out.
- Ana Paula Fogarty as Jimena "Ji" de Carmen, Papelucho's little sister.
- Mario Castañeda as Papelucho's father.
- Maggie Vera as Papelucho's mother.
- Nallely Solís as Domitila, Papelucho's nanny.
- Carlos del Campo as Professor Chuleta, the schoolteacher in Papelucho's class.
- Hugo Núñez and Bardo Miranda as The Fomes, a trio of cyan Martians that act as the police on Mars.

== Production ==
The Papelucho series is one of the most popular children's book in Chile. Cine Animadores, after their local success with Ogu and Mampato in Rapa Nui started the production of the film in 2005 with the financial help of Canal 13 Films, using 1.5 million Chilean bills in budget. Director Alejandro Rojas Téllez wanted to have a Papelucho film as CineAnimadores' first film since its founding in 1988 and was going to be based on the third book Papelucho historiador. However, the project only entered development when Canal 13 decided to invest in a feature-length film, by hiring Rojas and Juan Diego Garretón as directors. According to Alejandro Rojas himself, he explained that "The direction was a challenge-coordinating all the different viewpoints, from [Marcela Paz's] children to [Canal 13] itself. Everyone wanted something different; they all had different visions,”. The production had over 150 people, including colorists and animators, who made over 100,000 frames. The most notable difference between Papelucho and the Martian and Ogu and Mampato in Rapa Nui is the use of CG scenes (including objects, the backgrounds, and Papelucho's imagination sequences on Mars) mixed with traditional animation (a majority of the characters) at the same time, which was a trailblazer in Chilean animation for the time.

The film was very loosely based on the book of the same name Papelucho y el Marciano written by Marcela Paz in 1968 because is one of the most popular books of Papelucho line and also because of his sci-fi themes. The film was fully animated and produced in Chile, but it was dubbed in Mexico at Dubbing House, with recognized voice actors like Marina Huerta, Mario Castañeda and Maggie Vera, although Mexican voice actors maintained some Chilean Spanish slangs.

== Reception ==
=== Critical response ===
The movie was received with mostly mediocre to negative reviews by critics. Silva V., Ana Josefa, writing her review for the Chilean newspaper La Segunda, gave the film two white stars out of five blue stars, stating that the movie, despite being made and produced in Chile, felt Americanized as well as how it has an unfocused narrative, adding that, "The worst that this is simply not Papelucho at all; that this unknown child that they present is unclear; that the creators have no idea what to do with him and it shows: his "adventures" are a series of graceless events and his executions don't have any wit or intelligence, not even by a long shot. It's basically a boring movie, with bright colors, inspired by a series that is against all that."
