= List of submissions to the 75th Academy Awards for Best Foreign Language Film =

2002 Best Foreign Language Film submissions
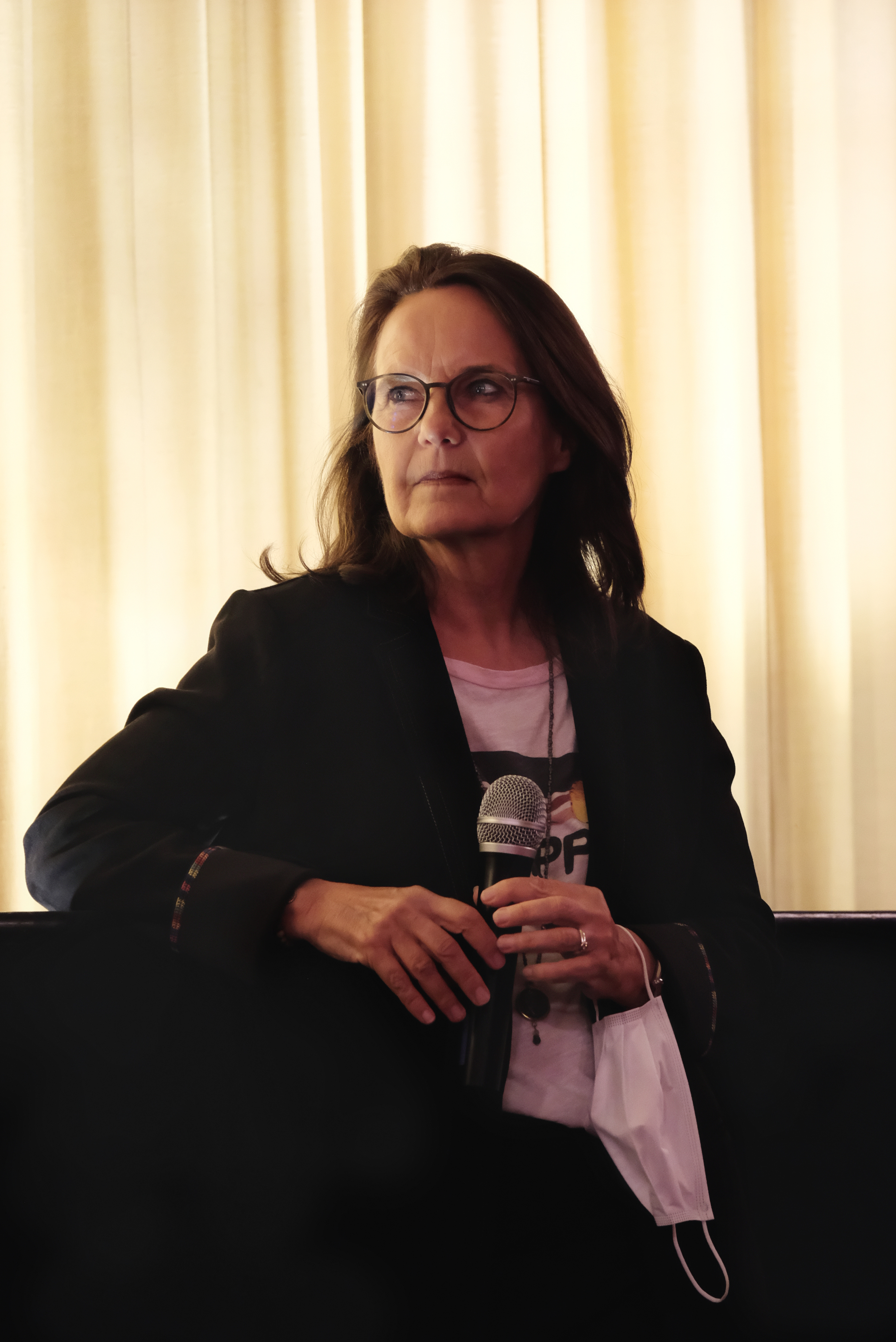
- Caroline Link directed Nowhere in Africa, which won the year's award.

Highlights
- Oscar winner: (Germany) Nowhere in Africa
- Submissions: 56
- Debuts: 4
- Total eligible: 54

This is a list of submissions to the 75th Academy Awards for the Best Foreign Language Film. The Academy of Motion Picture Arts and Sciences (AMPAS) has invited the film industries of various countries to submit their best film for the Academy Award for Best Foreign Language Film every year since the award was created in 1956. The award is presented annually by the Academy to a feature-length motion picture produced outside the United States that contains primarily non-English dialogue. The Foreign Language Film Award Committee oversees the process and reviews all the submitted films.

For the 75th Academy Awards, the submitted motion pictures must have first been released theatrically in their respective countries between 1 November 2001 and 31 October 2002. The deadline for submissions to the Academy was 1 November 2002. 56 countries submitted films, and 54 were found to be eligible by AMPAS and screened for voters. Afghanistan, Bangladesh, Chad, and Palestine submitted films for the first time; however, Palestine's film did not appear on the final list. The five nominees were announced on 11 February 2003.

Germany won the award for the second time, marking the first win since its reunification, with Nowhere in Africa by Caroline Link.

== Submissions ==
Submitting country	Film title used in nomination	Original title	Language(s)	Director(s)	Result
Afghanistan	FireDancer		Dari, Persian, English	Jawed Wassel	Not nominated
Algeria	Rachida		French, Arabic	Yamina Bachir-Chouikh	Not nominated
Argentina	Kamchatka		Spanish	Marcelo Piñeyro	Not nominated
Austria	Gebürtig		German, English, Yiddish	Robert Schindel and Lukas Stepanik	Not nominated
Bangladesh	The Clay Bird	মাটির ময়না	Bengali, Persian, Arabic, Urdu, Hindi	Tareque Masud	Not nominated
Belgium	The Son	Le fils	French	Jean-Pierre Dardenne	Not nominated
Brazil	City of God	Cidade de Deus	Brazilian Portuguese	Fernando Meirelles	Not nominated
Bulgaria	Warming Up Yesterday's Lunch	Подгряване на вчерашния обед / Подгревање на вчерашниот ручек	Bulgarian, Macedonian, Serbian	Kostadin Bonev	Not nominated
Canada	Soft Shell Man	Un crabe dans la tête	French, Quebec Sign Language, English	André Turpin	Not nominated
Chad	Abouna	أبونا	Arabic, French	Mahamat-Saleh Haroun	Not nominated
Chile	Ogu and Mampato in Rapa Nui	Ogú y Mampato en Rapa Nui	Spanish, Rapa Nui	Alejandro Rojas	Not nominated
China	Hero	英雄	Mandarin	Zhang Yimou	Nominated
Colombia	The Invisible Children	Los niños invisibles	Spanish	Lisandro Duque Naranjo	Not nominated
Croatia	Fine Dead Girls	Fine mrtve djevojke	Croatian	Dalibor Matanić	Not nominated
Cuba	Nothing More	Nada	Spanish	Juan Carlos Cremata Malberti	Not nominated
Czech Republic	The Wild Bees	Divoké vcely	Czech	Bohdan Sláma	Not nominated
Denmark	Open Hearts	Elsker dig for evigt	Danish	Susanne Bier	Not nominated
Egypt	A Girl's Secret	أسرار البنات	Arabic	Magdy Ahmed Ali	Not nominated
Finland	The Man Without a Past	Mies vailla menneisyyttä	Finnish	Aki Kaurismäki	Nominated
France	8 Women	8 femmes	French	François Ozon	Not nominated
Germany	Nowhere in Africa	Nirgendwo in Afrika	German, English, Swahili	Caroline Link	Won Academy Award
Greece	The Only Journey of His Life	Το Μόνον της Ζωής του Ταξείδιον	Greek	Lakis Papastathis	Not nominated
Hong Kong	The Touch	天脈傳奇	English, Mandarin, Lhasa Tibetan	Peter Pau	Disqualified
Hungary	Hukkle		Hungarian, Czech	György Pálfi	Not nominated
Iceland	The Sea	Hafið	Icelandic, Norwegian, English	Baltasar Kormákur	Not nominated
India	Devdas	देवदास	Hindi	Sanjay Leela Bhansali	Not nominated
Indonesia	A Courtesan	Ca-bau-kan / 擦包看	Indonesian, Betawi, Medan Hokkien, Javanese, Sundanese	Nia Dinata	Not nominated
Iran	I'm Taraneh, 15	من ترانه ۱۵ سال دارم	Persian	Rasul Sadrameli	Not nominated
Israel	Broken Wings	כנפיים שבורות	Hebrew	Nir Bergman	Not nominated
Italy	Pinocchio		Italian	Roberto Benigni	Not nominated
Japan	Out		Japanese	Hideyuki Hirayama	Not nominated
Lebanon	When Maryam Spoke Out	لمّا حكيت مريم	Arabic	Assad Fouladkar	Not nominated
Luxembourg	Dead Man's Hand	Petites misères	French	Laurent Brandenburger and Philippe Boon	Not nominated
Mexico	The Crime of Padre Amaro	El crimen del Padre Amaro	Spanish	Carlos Carrera	Nominated
Netherlands	Zus & Zo		Dutch, French, Portuguese, English	Paula van der Oest	Nominated
Norway	Hold My Heart	Tyven, tyven	Norwegian, Danish, English	Trygve Allister Diesen	Not nominated
Palestine	Divine Intervention	يد إلهية	Arabic, Hebrew, English	Elia Suleiman	Disqualified
Philippines	Small Voices	Mga Munting Tinig	Filipino, English	Gil Portes	Not nominated
Poland	Edi		Polish	Piotr Trzaskalski	Not nominated
Portugal	The Dauphin	O Delfim	Portuguese	Fernando Lopes (filmmaker)	Not nominated
Romania	Philanthropy	Filantropica	Romanian	Nae Caranfil	Not nominated
Russia	House of Fools	Дом дураков	Russian, Chechen	Andrei Konchalovsky	Not nominated
Slovakia	Cruel Joys	Kruté radosti	Slovak, Czech	Juraj Nvota	Not nominated
Slovenia	Headnoise	Zvenenje v glavi	Slovene	Andrej Košak	Not nominated
South Korea	Oasis	오아시스	Korean	Lee Chang-dong	Not nominated
Spain	Mondays in the Sun	Los lunes al sol	Spanish	Fernando León de Aranoa	Not nominated
Sweden	Lilya 4-ever		Russian, Swedish, English, Polish	Lukas Moodysson	Not nominated
Switzerland	A Loving Father	Aime ton père	French, Swedish, English	Jacob Berger	Not nominated
Taiwan	The Best of Times	美麗時光	Hakka, Mandarin, Taiwanese Hokkien, Jiaoliao Mandarin, English	Chang Tso-chi	Not nominated
Thailand	Monrak Transistor	มนต์รักทรานซิสเตอร์	Thai	Pen-ek Ratanaruang	Not nominated
Tunisia	The Magic Box	La boîte magique	French, Arabic	Ridha Behi	Not nominated
Turkey	9		Turkish	Ümit Ünal	Not nominated
United Kingdom	Eldra		Welsh, English, Welsh Romani	Tim Lyn	Not nominated
Uruguay	The Last Train	Corazon de fuego	Spanish	Diego Arsuaga	Not nominated
Venezuela	The Archangel's Feather	La pluma del arcángel	Spanish	Luis Manzo	Not nominated
FR Yugoslavia	Labyrinth	Лавиринт	Serbian, English	Miroslav Lekić	Not nominated

== Notes ==
- Afghanistan, which had been liberated from Taliban rule only a year before, submitted FireDancer by Jawed Wassel, their first-ever film for consideration. The movie, about Afghan-Americans, was filmed mostly in English, but partially in Dari and Persian. When the film was shown in Afghanistan, it was entirely dubbed into Dari and it was this version that was sent to the Oscars. At first, the Academy claimed that the submission did not quite conform to the rules, however, the film, whose director had been murdered before post-production was finished, was accepted.
- Brazil submitted City of God by Fernando Meirelles. It was considered one of the favorites, but was famously snubbed. When the film was released the following year in the United States, it was nominated for Best Director, Best Writing (Adapted Screenplay), Best Cinematography, and Best Film Editing.
- Hong Kong submitted The Touch by Peter Pau, but it was disqualified because the dialogue was completely in English, and not in a foreign language.
- Palestine submitted Divine Intervention by Elia Suleiman. AMPAS denied the film's entry, as it did not recognise Palestine as a country and, therefore, could not submit a film. They said that there had been no national selection committee that chose Divine Intervention, and it was unclear how the film would be released in its home country according to the rules, since Palestine had no internationally recognized boundaries. The decision drew condemnation from Palestinian human rights groups and Permanent Observer Mission of Palestine to the UN Feda Abdelhadi Nasser.. It was also criticized, especially since countries like Taiwan, Puerto Rico and Hong Kong, none of which recognized as sovereign nations by the United Nations, had been submitting movies for years. AMPAS reversed its decision the following year, and allowed Divine Intervention to compete.
- The United Kingdom originally submitted The Warrior by Asif Kapadia, a British-produced film set in India, spoken entirely in Hindi, and filmed by a British director of Indian descent. It was disqualified by the Academy of Motion Picture Arts and Sciences as the film did not take place in, nor was it filmed in a language indigenous to the United Kingdom. Had the film been set among the Hindi-speaking community in the United Kingdom, it would have been approved. BAFTA appealed to the Academy to reconsider, but to no avail. The United Kingdom ultimately sent Eldra by Tim Lyn, a film in Welsh.
