= Ogu and Mampato in Rapa Nui =

2002 film

- Theatrical release poster
- Directed by: Alejandro Rojas
- Written by: Screenplay and Writer: Daniel Turkeltaub; Original Comic Book: Themo Lobos
- Starring: Marina Huerta; Maynardo Zavala; Carlos del Campo; Gerardo Vázquez; Alondra Hidalgo; Mary Paz García; Mauro Samaniego; Miguel Angel Ghigliazza; Mario Castañeda; Adrián Fogarty; Benjamin Rivera
- Music by: Rodrigo Apablaza; Emilio Manutomatoma; Joe Vasconcellos
- Production company: Cine Animadores
- Distributed by: Mediafilm
- Release date: 27 June 2002
- Running time: 80 minutes
- Country: Chile
- Language: Spanish

Ogu and Mampato in Rapa Nui (Spanish: Ogú y Mampato en Rapa Nui), also known as Mampato: The Movie (Spanish: Mampato: La Película) is a 2002 Chilean animated science fiction adventure film, created by Cine Animadores and executive produced by Elastic Studios, released June 27, 2002. Although the film isn't the first animated feature made in Chile, being the second after Alfredo Serey's 1921 film La Trasmisión del Mando Presidencial (The Transmission of Presidential Control), it is considered the country's first "modern" animated film. The movie is based on the Chilean comics character Mampato created in 1971 for the magazine of the same name by Themo Lobos and Eduardo Armstrong, and later reprinted as the comic-book Cucalón, the story for the film being adapted from the seventh adventure in the series: "Mata-ki-te-rangui".

== Plot ==
Excited by his father's stories about Easter Island, Mampato decides to visit the island and unravel its mysteries. With the help of his time-space belt, he travels back to prehistoric times in search of his friendly caveman companion, Ogú.

Together, they journey through time and space and eventually arrive at the mythical island of Rapa Nui. There, they meet a young local girl named Marama, who becomes their host, guide, and companion on their adventure.

Unintentionally, the duo becomes entangled in the conflicts and rivalries among the island's inhabitants. The ariki, known as the Long Ears, dominate and exploit the Short Ears, to which Marama belongs. While they enjoy the hospitality of the Short Ears, they are relentlessly pursued by the Long Ears and their henchmen.

In their quest to uncover the mysteries of Rapa Nui, Mampato and Ogú join a rebellion against the Long Ears and their protectors. Thanks to Mampato's cunning, they ultimately triumph, and the Easter Islanders regain their rights.

After days of adventure, our heroes return home - Ogú to prehistoric times and Mampato back to the present, where only a few minutes have elapsed since he locked himself in his room.

== Production ==
Mampato is, with Condorito, the most popular and acclaimed comic strip from Chile. Cine Animadores, an emerging animation studio, chose Mampato to be made into the first feature-length animated film in Chilean history since the 1920s. Starting production in 1999, director Alejandro Rojas made a treatment with Themo Lobos and selected the seventh story rather than the first one, because it was based on Easter Island, a world-renowned location (with its famous Moais) best suited for a strong Latin American advertising campaign and as a means to generate non-Chilean interest.

Although the film was completely produced and animated in Chile, the voice acting was made in Mexico with recognizable voice actors like Mario Castañeda and Alondra Hidalgo. This was an attempt to achieve a neutral Spanish accent, but the choice was criticized in Chile for it reduced the Chilean feel of the original material (although the Mexican voice actors did get to say some Chilean Spanish slang words).

== Reception ==
The film got very good to decent reviews by critics and was Chile's submission to the Academy Award for Best Foreign Language Film in 2002.

== See also ==
- List of Chilean submissions for the Academy Award for Best Foreign Language Film
- List of submissions to the 75th Academy Awards for Best Foreign Language Film
- Papelucho and the Martian: The second Cine Animadores film, based on Papelucho books.
