= Anime Matsuri =

Annual anime convention

Coordinates: 29°45′8″N 95°21′28″W

- Status: Active
- Genre: Anime, Japanese culture
- Venue: George R. Brown Convention Center
- Location: Houston, Texas
- Country: United States
- Inaugurated: 2007
- Organizer: Deniece and John Leigh
- Website: www.animematsuri.com

Anime Matsuri is an annual four-day anime convention held during July/August at the George R. Brown Convention Center in Houston, Texas. The convention's name comes from the Japanese word 'matsuri' meaning festival.

== Programming ==
The convention's programming includes an artists' alley, a carshow, the attendance of celebrities and special guests, cosplay chess, cosplay contests, fashion shows, gaming events, karaoke, LARP, live concerts, maid cafe, panels, a vendors' and exhibitors' area, and workshops. The Charity Auction benefited Child's Play in 2009 and raised over $3,000.

== History ==
The convention was held at George R. Brown Convention Center and Hilton Americas in 2007. Anime Matsuris 2008, 2009, 2010, and 2012 were held at the Woodlands Waterway Marriott Hotel and Convention Center, and Anime Matsuri 2011 was held at the Crowne Plaza Houston Hotel near Reliant Park/Medical Center. Anime Matsuri 2013 was held at Hyatt Regency Houston. The Syfy reality series Heroes of Cosplay filmed the masquerade at Anime Matsuri and was featured in an episode. The convention in 2014 moved to the George R. Brown Convention Center. Complaints about the 2014 convention included long lines and delays. The convention in 2015 remained at the George R. Brown Convention Center and used the first and most of the second floors. In May 2016, Anime Matsuri announced that the former CEO of Anime Expo, Marc Perez would join the convention as COO. Anime Matsuri 2020 was moved from July to August due to the COVID-19 pandemic, and was later canceled after Houston announced the city would be holding no more events in 2020.

== Controversies ==
The owners of Anime Matsuri have a history of not paying their partners, like Houston native Mike Udompongsuk, who lent tens of thousands of dollars to Anime Matsuri over the years but never saw reimbursement, and financially burning its guests, like the record label PS Company, which represented the Japanese rock star Miyavi in 2009. Significant financial improprieties have also been alleged against the convention organizers. Voice actress Caitlin Glass attended Anime Matsuri 2014 as one of the guests, but refuses to have anything to do with the convention due to poor organisation and treatment of the guests. Voice actor Matthew Mercer attended as a guest in 2008, and was told without warning to emcee for the opening ceremony. He left Anime Matsuri before the closing ceremony, which he was also presumed to emcee for, despite not being asked.

After Anime Matsuri 2015, John Leigh, the convention's founder was accused of sexual harassment by several members of the Lolita fashion community. These include accusations of unwanted touching, slapping buttocks, sexual jokes, requesting nude photos, lifting up clothing and asking a woman when she last had an orgasm. The convention sent Tyler Willis, owner of YouTube channel Last Week Lolita News a cease and desist letter in early 2018 after reporting about John Leigh's sexual harassment. Boycott Anime Matsuri was formed in 2018 to inform about the convention's past actions, with guests such as Johnny Yong Bosch, Steven Universe voice actors, and Femm later cancelling. Leigh apologized for his past actions.

In 2019, Houston mayor Sylvester Turner was part of the opening ceremony of Anime Matsuri where he said he expected there to be more than 40,000 attendants that year. Anime Matsuri reported an attendance number of 43,000 for that year, but these numbers have been disputed. Anime Matsuri has been accused of inflating the number of attendants in its yearly reports. Patrick Delahanty of AnimeCons.com cited Anime Matsuri as the reason why they did not publish a list of the largest anime cons in the United States in 2019, as they did not want to reward Anime Matsuri for lying. Anime Matsuri has been retroactively removed from all of AnimeCons.com's previous reports on the largest anime cons of North America, citing the "significant discrepancies" between the numbers reported by the con, and the number of tickets sold according to the venue.

Mayor Turner returned to open the 2021 convention, but his appearance and support of the convention triggered controversy. Concerns were raised in 2025 due to the proposed Texas Senate Bill 20, which creates new criminal offenses for obscene content depicting children and how it would affect the convention.

Maxey Whitehead, the voice actress for Alphonse Elric in Fullmetal Alchemist: Brotherhood, canceled her planned appearance at the 2026 event after Anime Matsuri promoted it as a "reunion" with Vic Mignogna, alleging that it violated their contract.

== Event history ==
Dates	Location	Guests
April 27–29, 2007	George R. Brown Convention Center & Hilton Americas; Houston, Texas	Christine Auten, Christopher Ayres, Back-On, Jessica Boone, Peter Cullen, Fizz, Tiffany Grant, Matt Greenfield, Hilary Haag, Yaya Han, Kyle Jones, Chris Patton, RikkuX, and John Swasey.
March 21–23, 2008	The Woodlands Waterway Marriott Hotel & Convention Center; The Woodlands, Texas	Aural Vampire, Amelie Belcher, Bespa Kumamero, Luci Christian, JoEllen Elam, Yaya Han, Kate Higgins, Yuri Lowenthal, Matthew Mercer, Vic Mignogna, Tara Platt, Patrick Seitz, Stephanie Sheh, Sky Pirate, Space Invader, Barbara Staples, Sonny Strait, Bill Winans, and Stephanie Young.
April 10–12, 2009	The Woodlands Waterway Marriott Hotel & Convention Center; The Woodlands, Texas	Takuya Angel, Clint Bickham, Luci Christian, JoEllen Elam, Quinton Flynn, Jason David Frank, Crispin Freeman, Gren, DJ Heavygrinder, Mike McFarland, Matthew Mercer, Misako Rocks!, Miyavi, Chris Patton, Cynthia Rothrock, Kristine Sa, Blake Shepard, Sonny Strait, Strong Machine 2, Diana "Binkx" Tolin, and Stephanie Young.
April 2–4, 2010	The Woodlands Waterway Marriott Hotel & Convention Center; The Woodlands, Texas	Aural Vampire, Back-On, Leah Clark, Francesca Dani, India Davis, Crispin Freeman, DJ Heavygrinder, Thais Jussim, Reuben Langdon, Elizabeth Licata, Mike McFarland, Matthew Mercer, and Strong Machine 2.
March 18–20, 2011	Crowne Plaza Houston Hotel near Reliant Park / Medical Center; Houston, Texas	Luci Christian, Gacharic Spin, Hamutsun Serve, Hangry & Angry, Kyle Hebert, Mike McFarland, Matthew Mercer, Reni Mimura, Christopher Corey Smith, Michael Suarez, J. Michael Tatum, and Stephanie Young.
April 6–8, 2012	The Woodlands Waterway Marriott Hotel & Convention Center; The Woodlands, Texas	Airship Isabella, Troy Baker, Clint Bickham, Luci Christian, Maile Flanagan, Flow, Kathryn "Rynn" Griffin, Yaya Han, DJ Heavygrinder, Akinori Isobe, Masumi Kano, Cyril Lumboy, Mike McFarland, Matthew Mercer, Vic Mignogna, Amy Reeder, Sleeping Samurai, Strong Machine 2, Alexis Tipton, Shinichi Watanabe, Bill Winans, and Stephanie Young.
March 29–31, 2013	Hyatt Regency Houston; Houston, Texas	Misako Aoki, Johnny Yong Bosch, David Brehm, Erin Fitzgerald, Kathryn "Rynn" Griffin, Yaya Han, Kyle Hebert, Kelly Hu, Catherine Jones, Masumi Kano, Mike McFarland, Matthew Mercer, Carli Mosier, Justin Rojas, Michelle Rojas, Janet Varney, Waveya, Bill Winans, and Stephanie Young.
March 14–16, 2014	George R. Brown Convention Center; Houston, Texas	Misako Aoki, Johnny Yong Bosch, Luci Christian, Eyeshine, Caitlin Glass, Shunsuke Hasegawa, DJ HeavyGrinder, Aya Ikeda, Catherine Jones, Masumi Kano, Linda Le, Yuri Lowenthal, Mike McFarland, Matthew Mercer, Tara Platt, Marisha Ray, Reika, TeddyLoid, Janet Varney, Bill Winans, Mai Yamamoto, and Stephanie Young.
April 3–5, 2015	George R. Brown Convention Center; Houston, Texas	Misako Aoki, Asuka, Luci Christian, Olivia Chubear, Stella Chuu, Crispin Freeman, Todd Haberkorn, Shunsuke Hasegawa, DJ HeavyGrinder, Catherine Jones, Shigeto Koyama, Harrison Krix, Linda Le, Maki, Michiyo Murase, Atsushi Nishigori, Nylon Pink, Putumayo, Reika, Stephanie Sheh, Kaname Shiroboshi, Sushio, TeddyLoid, Anna Tsuchiya, Hiromi Wakabayashi, Bill Winans, Yoh Yoshinari, and Stephanie Young.
February 26–28, 2016	George R. Brown Convention Center; Houston, Texas	Akira, Ani-Mia, Misako Aoki, Astarohime, Angela Bermúdez, Johnny Yong Bosch, David Brehm, Stella Chuu, Leah Clark, Dario, Lance Falk, Goldy, Shunsuke Hasegawa, Hitomi, Kelly Hu, Chuck Huber, Kaname, Shinichi Kurita, Linda Le, Lana Marie, Mike McFarland, Vic Mignogna, Yui Minakata, Tae Yeon Minemes, Morning Musume, Enji Night, Ram Rider, Reika, Shiva, Yuzuru Tachikawa, Brian Tee, Christian Tremblay, Yvon Tremblay, Jennifer Van Damsel, David Vincent, Bill Winans, and Stephanie Young.
April 7–9, 2017	George R. Brown Convention Center; Houston, Texas	Akidearest, Akira, The Anime Man, Misako Aoki, Anjali Bhimani, Brilliant Kingdom, Christine Marie Cabanos, Danny Choo, Charlet Chung, Stella Chuu, Dancing Dolls, Disacode, Midori Fukasawa, Gacharic Spin, Megumi Han, Shunsuke Hasegawa, Hiko, Laura Jansen, Brittney Karbowski, Pion Kim, Su Hyun Kim, Ladybeard, Mago, Kazuya Masumoto, Vic Mignogna, Yui Minakata, Mirei, Misty/Chronexia, Aza Miyuko, Enji Night, Fumio Osano, Romi Park, Carolina Ravassa, Reika, Sailor Moon Musical Cast, Sakurako, Shiva, Masami Suda, Chinatsu Taira, and Cristina Vee.
March 30 – April 1, 2018	George R. Brown Convention Center; Houston, Texas	Patricia Acevedo, Yuri Akiba, Akira, B-Project, Beau Billingslea, Mario Castañeda, Leon Chiro, Color Pointe, Dancing Dolls, Hana Dinh, Dorilooko, Shunsuke Hasegawa, Honey Popcorn, Doug Jones, Tetsuya Kakihara, Pion Kim, Chiaki Kon, Astarohime Koyu, Made Monster, Maul Cosplay, Yua Mikami, Hideki Nakayama, Natsumi, Enji Night, Fumio Osano, Pugoffka, Root, Ryu-en, Asami Sanada, DJ Shintaro, Shiva, Somenzari, DJ Sunamori, Mari Takahashi, Team China, Mirei Touyama, Hibiki Yoshizaki, and Zwei.
June 13–16, 2019	George R. Brown Convention Center; Houston, Texas	Apink, Eva Bella, Ricardo Brust, Mario Castañeda, Leon Chiro, Richard Dorton, Rick Farmiloe, Gacharic Spin, Hana Bunny, HaneAme, Wataru Hatano, Junko Iwao, Doug Jones, Ellen Kim, Aina Kusuda, Patrick Kwok-Choon, Ladybaby, Reuben Langdon, Jason Liles, Made Monster, Alan Maxson, Vic Mignogna, DJ Misaki P, Sara Mitich, Nervo, Enji Night, Nobuhiko Okamoto, Reika, Damon Runyan, Harumo Sanazaki, Nozomu Sasaki, T. J. Storm, and Livvy Stubenrauch.
July 8–11, 2021	George R. Brown Convention Center; Houston, Texas	Patricia Acevedo, Morgan Berry, Matt Frank, Hana Bunny, Made Monster, Vic Mignogna, Pugoffka, and Kaho Shibuya.
July 29–31, 2022	George R. Brown Convention Center; Houston, Texas	Poonam Basu, Morgan Berry, Leon Chiro, Tiffany Gordon, Hana Bunny, Made Monster, Bryan Massey, Vic Mignogna, Pugoffka, Tiffany Vollmer, Dreamcatcher, and ≠Me.
August 10–13, 2023	George R. Brown Convention Center; Houston, Texas	Cynthia Cranz, Gacharic Spin, Hana Bunny, Shunsuke Hasegawa, Daisuke Ichikawa, Vic Mignogna, Pugoffka, Ryu-En, Sakurako, Tiffany Vollmer, and Linda Young.
August 8-11, 2024	George R. Brown Convention Center; Houston, Texas	Philo Barnhart, Mark Britten, Quinton Flynn, Hana Bunny, Chuck Huber, Vic Mignogna, DJ Misaki, Yuki Ono, Tiffany Vollmer, Yama, Barry Yandell, =Love, and Shinji Nishikawa.
July 10-13, 2025	George R. Brown Convention Center; Houston, Texas	Disacode, Rick Farmiloe, Flow, Hana Bunny, Ray Hurd, Allison Keith-Shipp, Bryan Massey, Vic Mignogna, Pugoffka, Rick Robertson, Dan Southworth, Karen Strassman, Tiffany Vollmer, and Kazuki Yao.
July 23-26, 2026	George R. Brown Convention Center; Houston, Texas	Brian Beacock, Ricardo Brust, Hana Bunny, Kaida Cosplay, Reuben Langdon, Mela Lee, Vic Mignogna, Steve Prince, Pugoffka, David Angelo Roman, Dan Southworth, David Vincent, and Ezra Weisz.

== Anime Matsuri Mini ==
Anime Matsuri Mini is a two-day anime convention held during February at the Houston Marriott Sugar Land and Sugar Land Town Square in Sugar Land, Texas.

=== Event history ===
Dates	Location	Atten.	Guests
February 1-2, 2025	Houston Marriott Sugar Land; Sugar Land Town Square; Sugar Land, Texas		David Eddings, Dale D. Kelly, Bryan Massey, Vic Mignogna, Rick Robertson, and Dylan Thompson.

== Anime Matsuri Hawaii ==
Anime Matsuri Hawaii (AMHI) was a three-day anime convention held during November at the Hawaii Convention Center in Honolulu, Hawaii. The convention's programming included a concert, cosplay showcase, J-Fashion show, screenings, and panels. Yuegene Fay, a Thai cosplayer, was unable to make a guest appearance due to immigration issues. Upon arrival in Honolulu she was detained and put in a holding cell for three days. Anime Matsuri Hawaii did not return in 2016.

=== Event history ===
Dates	Location	Atten.	Guests
November 27–29, 2015	Hawaii Convention Center; Honolulu, Hawaii		Johnny Yong Bosch, Stella Chuu, DaizyStripper, Maile Flanagan, Crispin Freeman, Goldy, Shunsuke Hasegawa, Linda Le, Yui Minakata, Masahiko Otsuka, Reika, Justin Rojas, and Chinatsu Taira.

== Anime licensor ==
In July 2022, Anime Matsuri announced they had licensed two shorts from Nippon Animation, Genbanojō and Chuck Shimezō. Both were dubbed and Vic Mignogna was controversially involved in the production.
