= Juliet Ace =

Welsh dramatist (1938–2025)

- Born: 27 June 1938; Llanelli, Carmarthenshire, Wales
- Died: 6 August 2025 (aged 87)
- Education: Rose Bruford College of Speech and Drama
- Occupations: Dramatist, screenwriter
- Children: Dan Alexander, Catherine Alexander
- Writing career
- Language: English, Welsh

Ann Juliet Ace (27 June 1938 – 6 August 2025) was a Welsh dramatist and screenwriter who contributed to EastEnders and The District Nurse. She also supplied many original scripts and dramatisations to BBC Radio drama, including The Archers. Ace wrote the screenplay for Cameleon, which won the Golden Spire Award for Best Dramatic Television Feature at the 1998 San Francisco International Film Festival.

== Early life and teaching ==
Ace was the third daughter of Charles and Glenys Ace, born and raised in Llanelli, Carmarthenshire in South Wales. She was educated at Llanelli Girls' Grammar School, City of Coventry Training College, which was soon to become Coventry College of Education and be incorporated into the University of Warwick, where she specialised in drama and art. She then trained further at Rose Bruford College of Speech and Drama.

Ace taught for three years in St Mary Cray before joining a children's theatre company, and then working in weekly repertory at the Grand Theatre, Swansea for two seasons. In 1964, she began to work with children with special needs.

After her marriage to Richard Alexander in 1966 Ace moved to Dartmouth, Devon, where her husband worked as a civilian lecturer at the Britannia Royal Naval College. For the next 18 years she brought up their two children: Daniel Alexander, now a business consultant, and Catherine Alexander, a theatre director and drama teacher. Meanwhile, Ace continued working with special-needs children, privately and in local schools, and directed and acted with local drama groups.

== Stage and radio ==
Juliet Ace began writing plays in 1976, after taking part in an Arvon Foundation writing course. In 1979 she won a Gulbenkian Foundation/Arts Council of Great Britain Award to work with professional directors and actors on new writing. As a result, her first play, Speak No Evil was produced first as a stage play in Bristol and then as a radio play, directed by Enyd Williams. It was nominated for a Pye Award.

After her early work in radio, she moved into television, where she worked with Julia Smith and Tony Holland and was taken from The District Nurse series to the creation of the BBC's EastEnders, and then to the short-lived expatriate soap opera Eldorado.

While her dramatic imagination is rich – a leading character in the radio play Lobby Talk is a parrot – her background in life is also significant. Two successful sequences of radio dramas are uncommonly open semi-autobiographical journeys: first there is young Mattie Jones, growing up in South Wales, who appears as a child in The New Look: Tailor's Tacks, set in 1946, and then completes her growth into a teenager in 1955, four plays later, in Mattie and Bluebottle. An older Mattie, liberated by writing and performed by Patricia Hodge in four plays, starting with The Captain's Wife, and concluding with Upside Down in the Roasting Tin, is a testament to experience.

Juliet Ace tutored theatre undergraduates at Dartington College of Arts as a visiting playwright in 1985–87, and postgraduate students of writing and directing in the Media and Communications Department at Goldsmiths College in 1995–2005. She served as a judge of the Koestler Awards, for writing by prisoners, in the 1990s, and was a BAFTA jury member for many ywars, well into her final illness.

In 1988, her play A Slight Hitch was included in the Oxford University Press collection, New Plays, Volume 1, edited by Peter Terson, which included work by Terson, Arnold Wesker and Henry Livings.

Ace's book about the actor Terence Rigby, Rigby Shlept Here: A Memoir of Terence Rigby 1937–2008, was published in November 2014, and the actor and director Peter Eyre described it in his review as "a fascinating and unusual memoir of a fascinating and unusual actor.... There is an unknown and detailed documentation of his work with Pinter, Peter Hall and Ian McKellen, among others, some of it quite shocking." It includes diary entries from Ace covering decades of her friendship with Rigby, interviews with colleagues such as Michael Gambon, and letters and extracts from an attempted autobiography by Rigby, interrupted by his early death.

In October, 2013, Ace was diagnosed with terminal cancer – her radio plays The Captain’s Wife and Skin had reflected on earlier bouts with the disease – and was given a fifty-fifty chance of surviving until Christmas that year. Nearly five years later, in May, 2018, she saw her play Moving the Goalposts performed at London's Southbank Centre as part of B(old] a season celebrating age and creativity. At the festival she was even photographed dancing, holding on to her three-wheeled mobility aid, to the music of another featured artist, Cleo Sylvestre.

Moving the Goalposts, despite the gloomy prognosis of Ace's doctors, gave her character Mattie a new lease of life, charting the frustrations, comedy and medical implausibility of her intellectual and physical survival beyond the predictions of concerned consultants. With Cheryl Campbell taking the role of Mattie for the stage, and directed by Nancy Meckler, it was a triumph of wit over malady. Ace joined Campbell and Meckler on to the stage to discuss the process of writing and realising the play. Jude Kelly, who chaired the discussion as one her last acts as departing Artistic Director of the Southbank Centre, gave warm praise to the honesty and resilience of Ace's writing, citing her recognition of its truth through her own experience with a family member. Moving the Goalposts saw further life in a BBC broadcast in March 2020, with the Welsh actor Pam Ferris taking the role of Mattie.

== Personal life and death ==
Ace lived in London. She died on 6 August 2025, aged 87.

== Awards and honours ==
In September 2014 Ace was made a fellow of the renamed Rose Bruford College of Theatre and Performance, in a ceremony which also made Katie Mitchell and Jenny Sealey Honorary Fellows.

== Radio plays ==
Radio Plays written by Juliet Ace
Date first broadcast	Play	Director	Cast	Notes	Station Series
6 September 1980	Speak No Evil	Enyd Williams	Elizabeth Morgan, John Griffiths and Rhys Powis	Runner-up Society of Authors/Pye Award	BBC Radio 4 Thirty-Minute Theatre
5 February 1983	Dreams Remembered	Shaun MacLaughlin	Steve Hodson, Petra Markham, Sean Barrett and Jo Anderson		BBC Radio 4 Thirty-Minute Theatre
10 December 1983	A Time Between Comets	Enyd Williams	Iwan Jones, Rhys Thomas, Simon Williams and Guto Harri		BBC Radio 4 Afternoon Theatre
7 August 1984	Model Answers or, Tarzan and the Cross-eyed Baby	Shaun MacLaughlin	Elizabeth Proud and Marcus D'Amico	Runner-up Sony Awards	BBC Radio 4 Afternoon Theatre
18 February 1986	Embroideries	Shaun MacLaughlin	Stephen Thorne and Elizabeth Proud		BBC Radio 4 Afternoon Play
25 February 1986	The Red Shoes	Penny Gold	Anna Massey, Martin Jarvis and Natasha Pyne		BBC Radio 4 Thirty-Minute Theatre
13 May 1986	Jonathan George Can Walk on the Water	Shaun MacLauglin	Peter Jeffrey and Shirley Dixon		BBC Radio 4 Afternoon Play
30 October 1988 – 18 December 1988	Crown House (Note: By Peter Ling and Juliet Ace)	Graham Gauld	Martin Jarvis, Jane Asher, Margaret Rawlings, Dinah Sheridan, Richard Pasco, Barbara Leigh-Hunt, Gayle Hunnicutt and Dominic Rickhards	Adapted from Peter Ling's trilogy of Crown House novels. Eight 30-minute episodes.	BBC Radio 4
17 November 1988	Digressions	Shaun MacLaughlin	Jenny Funnell		BBC Radio 4
8 January 1990	The Spur	Shaun MacLaughlin	Christian Rodska, Anthony Jackson, Vincent Brimble and Anne Morrish		BBC Radio 4 Monday Play
22 November 1990	Lobby Talk (Note: By Juliet Ace and Vic Aiken)	Shaun MacLaughlin	Andrew Sachs, Stephen Thorne, Steve Hodson, Christian Rodska, Kim Wall, June Barrie, William Eedle, Danny Schiller, Meg Davies, Jonathan Nibbs and Kate Lynn-Evans		BBC Radio 4
2 November 1991	The Little Walls (Note: By Winston Graham, dramatised by Juliet Ace)	Ned Chaillet	Alex Jennings, Roger Lloyd-Pack, Kate Bufferey, Vivian Pickles, Norman Jones, Helen Cooper, Terence Edmond, Timothy Morand, Eric Allen, Ronald Herdman, Siriol Jenkins, Cassie MacFarlane, Neil Roberts, David Sinclair, Matthew Sim and Auriol Smith	Winston Graham's novel was the first winner of the Crime Writers' Association Crossed Red Herring award for best crime novel of the year	BBC Radio 4 Saturday Play Gold and Silver Daggers Season
10 March 1992	Jacob's Folly	Penny Gold	Jennie Linden, Paola Dionisotti and John Church		BBC Radio 4
8 April 1993	Truth Confined	Shaun McLoughlin	David Learner, Charles Simpson, Melinda Walker and Kate Binchy		BBC Radio 4 Afternoon Play
7 August 1995	Twin Reaction – Part One: Look Again	Shaun MacLoughlin	Jenny Funnell, Carolyn Backhouse, Eric Allen, Cornelius Garrett, Lindsay Mack, Ian Sanders, Rachel Oldfield, Paul Nicholson, Janet Dale, Marilla Robson, Brian Gear and Jilly Bond	Three-part police drama	BBC Radio 4
14 August 1995	Twin Reaction – Part Two: Come Follow	Shaun MacLoughlin	See Part One		BBC Radio 4
21 August 1995	Twin Reaction – Part Three: Double Trouble	Shaun MacLoughlin	See Part One		BBC Radio 4
9 October 1995	Zinar's Tower	Shaun MacLoughlin	Zia Mohyeddin and Karzan Krekar		BBC Radio 4 Monday Play
30 August 1997	Love Story (Note: By Erich Segal, dramatised by Juliet Ace)	Ned Chaillet	Ingri Damon, Mark Leake, Patrick Allen, Sheila Allen, John Guerrasio, David Brooks, William Dufris, Gerrard McDermott, Tracy-Ann Oberman and Christopher Wright Harpsichord: David Roblou		BBC Radio 4 Saturday Play 90 Minutes
8 May 1998	The Captain's Wife	Ned Chaillet	Patricia Hodge		BBC Radio 4 Afternoon Play
14 May 1999	The New Look: Tailor's Tacks	Tanya Nash	Stephanie Wookey and Jennifer Hill		BBC Radio 4
21 May 1999	The New Look: Beeny's Camiknickers	Tanya Nash	Stephanie Wookey and Jennifer Hill		BBC Radio 4 Afternoon Play
28 May 1999	The New Look: Celluloid Lady	Tanya Nash	Stephanie Wookey and Jennifer Hill	Afternoon Play	
6 December 1999	Her Infinite Variety – Play One: Writing to Veronica	Ned Chaillet	Eleanor Moriarty	Five 15-minute plays inspired by Shakespeare's Women.	BBC Radio 4 Woman's Hour Serial
7 December 1999	Her Infinite Variety – Play Two: Talking to my Shrink	Sarah Brown	Gavin Muir and Gemma Saunders		BBC Radio 4 Woman's Hour Serial
8 December 1999	Her Infinite Variety – Play Three: Diary of a Dutiful Daughter	Ned Chaillet	Anna Massey		BBC Radio 4 Woman's Hour Serial
9 December 1999	Her Infinite Variety – Play Four: And All That Jazz	Ned Chaillet	Bette Bourne		BBC Radio 4 Woman's Hour Serial
10 December 1999	Her Infinite Variety – Play Five: Dirty Linen	Ned Chaillet	Elizabeth Bell and Oliver Cotton		BBC Radio 4 Woman's Hour Serial
24 January 2000	Private Papers (Note: By Margaret Forster, dramatised by Juliet Ace)	Tanya Nash	Angela Pleasence, Nichola McAuliffe, Simon Armstrong and Jenny Funnell		BBC Radio 4 Woman's Hour Serial
21 August 2000	Small Parts	Ned Chaillet	Patricia Hodge	The second play written for Patricia Hodge about Mattie.	BBC Radio 4 Afternoon Play
22 January 2001	Young Victoria	Cherry Cookson	Imogen Stubbs, Anna Massey, Adrian Lukis and Christopher Cazenove	Ten-part serial about the early life of Queen Victoria, based on her letters and diaries.	BBC Radio 4 Woman's Hour Serial
3 December 2001	Money for Old Rope	Gilly Adams	Di Botcher, Aled Pugh and Jennifer Vaughan		BBC Radio 4 Afternoon Play
1 September 2001	The Marseilles Trilogy: Marius (Note: By Marcel Pagnol, adapted by Juliet Ace from a translation by Margaret Jarman)	Ned Chaillet	Richard Johnson, Simon Scardifield, Monica Dolan and Andrew Sachs		BBC Radio 4 The Saturday Play
8 September 2001	The Marseilles Trilogy: Fanny	Ned Chaillet	Monica Dolan, Richard Johnson, Andrew Sachs and Simon Scardifield		BBC Radio 4 The Saturday Play
15 September 2001	The Marseilles Trilogy: César	Ned Chaillet	Richard Johnson, Simon Scardifield, Monica Dolan, Andrew Sachs, Tam Williams, Steve Hodson, Stephen Thorne, Struan Rodger, Phillip Joseph and Sean Baker		BBC Radio 4 The Saturday Play
27 September 2002	Blind	Gilly Adams	Mali Harries and Jennifer Hill		BBC Radio 4 Afternoon Play
12 December 2003	Dead-Heading the Roses	Ned Chaillet	Jill Balcon, Daniel Day-Lewis, Cheryl Campbell, Graham Crowden and William Hootkins		BBC Radio 4 Afternoon Play
20 February 2004	Mattie and Bluebottle	Alison Hindell	Mali Harries, Mared Swain and Matthew Gravelle	The fifth and final play about Mattie Jones growing up in Wales.	BBC Radio 4 Afternoon Play
23 February 2004 – 5 March 2004	The L-Shaped Room (Note: By Lynne Reid Banks, dramatised by Juliet Ace)	Alison Hindell	Lynne Seymour, Trevor Laird, John McAndrew, Bill Wallis and John Rowe	Ten-part serial	BBC Radio 4 Woman's Hour Serial
8 March 2004	Skin	Ned Chaillet	Patricia Hodge		BBC Radio 4 Afternoon Play
16 May 2005	The Backward Shadow	Alison Hindell	Siriol Jenkins, Rachel Atkins, Simon Ludders, Nickie Rainsford and John McAndrew	Ten-part sequel to The L-Shaped Room	BBC Radio 4 Woman's Hour Serial
10 January 2008	Chocolate Frigates	Tracey Neale	Todd Carty, Lindsey Coulson, Jamie Kenna and Nick Sayce		BBC Radio 4 Afternoon Play
2 June 2008	Shredder	Jane Morgan	Gwen Taylor, Stephen Thorne, Avril Elgar, Helen Longworth, Nyasha Hatendi, Steve Hodson and Stephen Critchlow		BBC Radio 4 Afternoon Play
19 March 2020	Moving the Goalposts	Tracey Neale	Pam Ferris		BBC Radio 4 Afternoon Drama

== Further radio, audio and stage work ==
- The Archers BBC Radio 4 Twenty-five episodes
- Brassic Eight-part series for teenagers for BBC Radio 5 (Beginning 4 January 1991)
- Kiss Me Quick. A serial for teenagers. Directed by Sally Avens and Nandita Ghose. 7 eps. BBC Radio 5. Beginning January 1994.
- Westway BBC World Service soap. Directed by David Hutchison and Anne Edyvean. Pilot plus 24 Episodes. (From 1997)
- Patricia Hodge is Mattie – A Liberated Woman AudioGo Audiobook comprising three BBC one-woman plays featuring Patricia Hodge as the character Mattie and a fourth play, Upside Down in the Roasting Tin reflecting Mattie's life seen over many Christmases.
- Moving the Goalposts. A play for one woman. Directed by Nancy Meckler and performed by Cheryl Campbell. 20 May 2018. Purcell Room, Southbank Centre, London. Ace's alter ego, Mattie, offers a wry and searing late act as she relives five years of surviving cancer, with intact wits and minimal medical intervention, apart from an annoying and frustrating dependence on steroids – a witty refrain in the text.

== Television series ==
- The District Nurse (4 episodes )
  - Episode #1.9 (6 March 1984)
  - Episode #2.6 (20 November 1984)
  - Episode #2.7 (27 November 1984)
  - A Terrible Itch (12 April 1987)
- EastEnders - Twenty-five episodes including:
  - Episode #1.26 (16 May 1985) Episode 26: Den and Angie decide to try to save their marriage and to end their respective affairs.
  - Episode #1.60 (12 September 1985)
  - Episode #1.95 (14 January 1986)
  - Episode #1.138 (12 June 1986)
  - Episode #1.201 (15 January 1987)
  - Episode dated 26 September 1989
- Eldorado
  Twelve episodes for the expatriate BBC soap, beginning with Episode 13 shown on 3 August 1992

== Films for television ==
- Out of Order. TV Movie BBC 2 directed by Prudence Fitzgerald starring Sarah Badel 1984
- Llygad y Ffynnon. Feature-length film for the Welsh-language station S4C directed by Huw Eirug, 23 October 1994.
- Cameleon. Prize-winning Welsh film directed by Ceri Sherlock with an award-winning performance by Aneirin Hughes. 1997 drama of a young soldier deserting in the Second World War to return to South Wales where he hides in the connected attics of a terrace of houses, adapting to the different households.

== Journalism and publications ==
- Tony Holland Obituary, The Guardian, 3 December 2007
- Speak No Evil. Bristol Playwrights Company. 1981
- New Plays, Volume 1 (ed. Peter Terson) OUP ISBN 9780198312567
- Rigby Shlept Here: A Memoir of Terence Rigby 1937-2008, 2014, ASIN: B00Q25491I
