= List of British submissions for the Academy Award for Best International Feature Film =

Best International Feature Film submissions from the United Kingdom

Highlights
- Debut: 1991
- Submissions: 23
- Nominations: 3
- Oscar winners: 1

The United Kingdom has submitted films for consideration for the Academy Award for Best International Feature Film (Note: The category was previously named the Academy Award for Best Foreign Language Film, but this was changed to the Academy Award for Best International Feature Film in April 2019, after the Academy deemed the word "Foreign" to be outdated.) irregularly since 1991. The award is handed out annually by the Academy of Motion Picture Arts and Sciences to a feature-length motion picture produced outside the United States that contains primarily non-English dialogue.

The UK has one of the world's most visible film industries and British films, as well as British actors, actresses and behind-the-scenes crew members have been prominently featured amongst Academy nominees and winners since the 1930s. Most British features are not eligible for the Best International Feature Film award, because they are produced in English. The British nominee is selected by the British Academy of Film and Television Arts (BAFTA), following the 50% non-English dialogue rule.

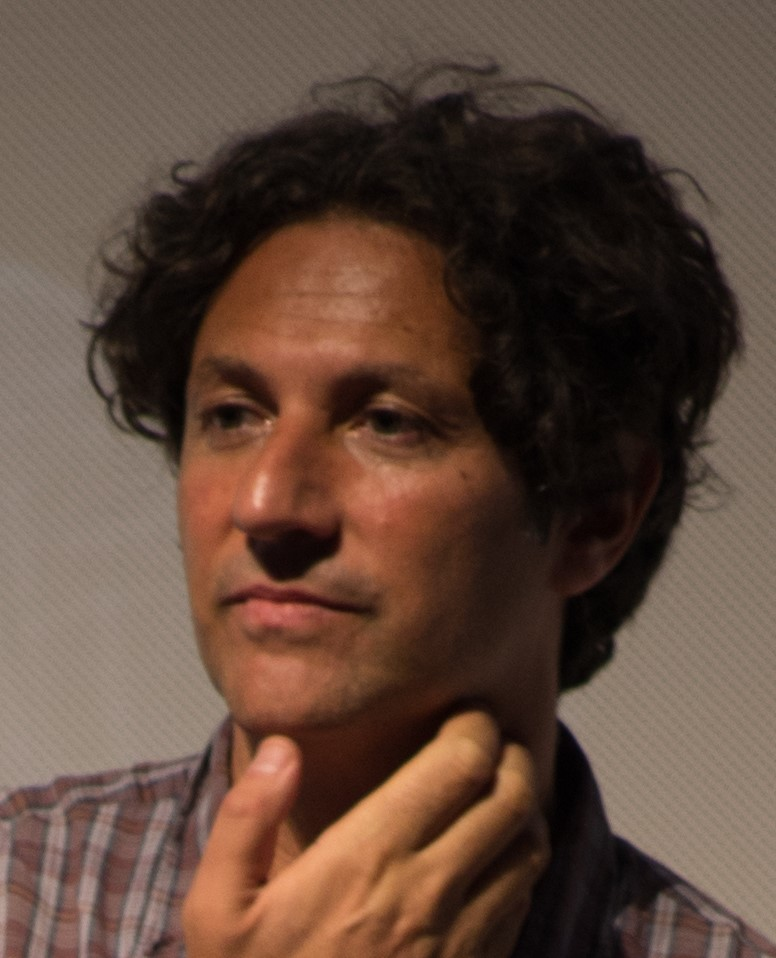
Jonathan Glazer directed the first British film to win the award, The Zone of Interest (2023).

As of 2026, the United Kingdom has been nominated three times, winning once for The Zone of Interest (2023).

== Submissions ==
The Academy of Motion Picture Arts and Sciences has invited the film industries of various countries to submit their best film for the Academy Award for Best International Feature Film since 1956. The International Feature Film Committee oversees the process and reviews all the submitted films. Following this, they vote via secret ballot to determine the five nominees for the award.

The country first nominated films were: Hedd Wyn (1993), directed by Paul Turner, and Solomon & Gaenor (1999), directed by Paul Morrison.

Many of the submitted films were made by directors from or based in Wales, and were partially or completely filmed in the Welsh language. Other films have been in languages spoken in the UK's ethnic minority communities. As yet, there have been no submissions in Scots, Angloromani, Cornish or Scottish Gaelic, and one film, Branwen (1995), that was partially in Irish. The 2007 film Seachd: The Inaccessible Pinnacle (Scottish Gaelic) was promoted by campaigners but was not submitted to the Academy.

The Warrior (2002), mainly in Hindi, was controversially disqualified by AMPAS because the film did not take place in, nor was it filmed in a language indigenous to, the United Kingdom. The rule was changed in 2005, and the first film to benefit was a Hindi-language film from Canada.

In 2007, the British Academy of Film and Television Arts (BAFTA) invited British filmmakers to submit films for consideration to represent the UK in the category. Two films responded to the call: Calon Gaeth, in Welsh, and Seachd: The Inaccessible Pinnacle, one of the first films made in Scots Gaelic. For unknown reasons, the BAFTA declined to submit either film. The ensuing controversy led to widespread coverage in the international press and producer Christopher Young resigning his membership of BAFTA. The matter was also raised in the Scottish Parliament and BAFTA was asked to reconsider its decision, to no avail.

The Zone of Interest (2023), directed by Jonathan Glazer, was the first British film to win in the category, and also won Best Sound, and was nominated for the Best Picture, Best Director and Best Adapted Screenplay.

Santosh (2024) advanced to the December shortlist, but was not nominated.

Below is a list of the films that have been submitted by the United Kingdom for review by the Academy for the award by year and the respective Academy Awards ceremony.

Year (Ceremony)	Film title used in nomination	Original title	Language(s)	Director(s)	Result
1991 (64th)	Lost in Siberia (Note: Britain's initial Oscar submission, Lost in Siberia, was set in Russia, and focused on a British archaeologist imprisoned in a Soviet gulag.)		Russian, English	Alexander Mitta	Not nominated
1993 (66th)	Hedd Wyn (Note: All six British submissions between 1993 and 2002 were set in Wales.)		Welsh	Paul Turner	Nominated
1995 (68th)	Branwen		Welsh, Irish, English	Ceri Sherlock	Not nominated
1998 (71st)	Cameleon		Welsh	Ceri Sherlock	Not nominated
1999 (72nd)	Solomon & Gaenor	Solomon a Gaenor	Welsh, English	Paul Morrison	Nominated
2001 (74th)	Do Not Go Gentle	Oed Yr Addewid	Welsh, English	Emlyn Williams	Not nominated
2002 (75th)	Eldra		Welsh, English	Tim Lyn	Not nominated
2008 (81st)	Hope Eternal (Note: set in Southern Africa)		Bemba, English, Welsh, French, Afrikaans, Swahili	Karl Francis	Not nominated
2009 (82nd)	Afghan Star (Note: In 2009, the UK submitted a documentary, and a film directed by a woman, for the first time with Afghan Star, about an American Idol-type talent competition in post-Taliban Afghanistan.)		Dari, Pashto, English	Havana Marking	Not nominated
2011 (84th)	Patagonia (Note: set in Argentina and Wales.)		Welsh, Spanish	Marc Evans	Not nominated
2013 (86th)	Metro Manila (Note: set in the Philippines.)		Filipino	Sean Ellis	Not nominated
2014 (87th)	Little Happiness (Note: set in Turkey.)	Uzun Yol	Turkish	Nihat Seven	Not nominated
2015 (88th)	Under Milk Wood (Note: set in Wales.)	Dan y Wenallt	Welsh	Kevin Allen	Not nominated
2016 (89th)	Under the Shadow (Note: set in Iran.)	زیر سایه	Persian	Babak Anvari	Not nominated
2017 (90th)	My Pure Land (Note: set in Pakistan.)		Urdu	Sarmad Masud	Not nominated
2018 (91st)	I Am Not a Witch (Note: set in Zambia.)		English, Bemba	Rungano Nyoni	Not nominated
2019 (92nd)	The Boy Who Harnessed the Wind (Note: set in Malawi.)		English, Chichewa	Chiwetel Ejiofor	Not nominated
2021 (94th)	Dying to Divorce (Note: set in Turkey.)	Ölümüne Boşanmak	Turkish, English	Chloe Fairweather	Not nominated
2022 (95th)	Winners (Note: set in Iran.)	برنده‌ها	Persian	Hassan Nazer	Not nominated
2023 (96th)	The Zone of Interest (Note: set in Occupied Poland.)		German, Polish, Yiddish	Jonathan Glazer	Won Academy Award
2024 (97th)	Santosh (Note: set in India.)		Hindi	Sandhya Suri	Made shortlist
2025 (98th)	My Father's Shadow (Note: set in Nigeria.)		Yoruba, Nigerian Pidgin, English	Akinola Davies Jr.	Not nominated
2026 (99th)	Rehearsals for a Revolution (Note: set in Iran.)	خاطرات ایران	Persian, English	Pegah Ahangarani	Pending

== See also ==
- List of Academy Award winners and nominees for Best International Feature Film
- List of Academy Award-winning foreign language films
- Cinema of the United Kingdom
- Independent cinema in the United Kingdom
- List of Irish submissions for the Academy Award for Best International Feature Film
- List of Academy Award winners and nominees from Great Britain
