= Mampato (disambiguation) =

Mampato is a Chilean adventure and science fiction comic strip.

Mampato may also refer to:

- Mampato amusement park, Puente Alto, Chile
- "Mampato" a song by Chancho en Piedra on their 2000 album Marca Chancho
- Mampato, Chilean children's magazine
