= List of highest-grossing Afghan films =

List of Afghan films by worldwide box-office gross

List of highest-grossing Afghan films provides a ranking of Afghan-produced or co-produced feature films by worldwide box-office gross. Due to the limited theatrical infrastructure and lack of domestic tracking systems, most Afghan films earn revenue from international festivals, limited releases, and co-productions. This list only includes films with publicly reported box-office returns.

== Background ==
Afghanistan's film industry has faced significant challenges due to decades of conflict, censorship, and underdeveloped infrastructure. Despite this, Afghan filmmakers have produced critically acclaimed films that gained attention at international film festivals. However, reliable box-office data remains scarce, as many Afghan films are screened at festivals or distributed in limited international markets rather than through commercial theatrical release within the country.

== Inclusion criteria ==
This list includes Afghan-produced or Afghan co-produced films with verifiable box-office gross reported by reliable sources. Only theatrical releases with available financial data are considered. Films purely set in Afghanistan but not produced by Afghan entities (such as The Kite Runner) are excluded.

=== Notable exclusions ===
Some well-known films set in Afghanistan or involving Afghan stories are not included due to lack of box-office data or non-Afghan production status. Examples include:

- The Kite Runner (2007) – U.S. production with Afghan setting.
- Kandahar (2001) – Iranian production.
- Afghan festival films like Wajma: An Afghan Love Story and Kabullywood lack published box-office revenue, despite critical acclaim.

=== Limitations ===
Due to the absence of a formal box-office reporting system in Afghanistan, and limited theatrical infrastructure, this list is not exhaustive. Many Afghan films earn primarily from festivals, grants, or streaming platforms. Thus, box-office revenue does not necessarily reflect a film's popularity or cultural impact within Afghan cinema.

== Highest-grossing Afghan films ==
The following table ranks Afghan films with verifiable gross revenue from theatrical release:

Rank	Title	Year	Director	Worldwide gross (USD)	Notes
1	Osama	2003	Siddiq Barmak	$3,888,902	First post-Taliban Afghan film; won the Golden Globe Award for Best Foreign Language Film.
2	The Patience Stone	2012	Atiq Rahimi	$654,587	Afghan–French co-production; Afghanistan’s entry for the 85th Academy Awards.
3	Kabuli Kid	2008	Barmak Akram	$55,685	French–Afghan co-production; screened at Venice and other international festivals.
4	Earth and Ashes	2004	Atiq Rahimi	$9,530	Based on Rahimi’s own novel; screened at Cannes (Un Certain Regard).
5	Fire Dancer	2002	Jawed Wassel & Ashok Nanda	$2,422	First Afghan film submitted for the Oscars; limited release in the U.S.

== See also ==
- Cinema of Afghanistan
- List of Afghan submissions for the Academy Award for Best International Feature Film
- List of highest-grossing films
