= Fernando López (disambiguation) =

Fernando Lopez (1904–1993) was a Filipino statesman.

Fernando López may also refer to:

- Fernando López Tuero (1857–1907), Puerto Rican agricultural scientist and agronomist
- Fernando López (equestrian) (1908–2006), Spanish Olympic equestrian
- Fernando López (pitcher) (born 1952), Mexican baseball player (See 1977 Caribbean Series)
- Fernando López Arias (1905–1978), Mexican politician and governor of Veracruz
- Fernando López (Chilean footballer) (born 1980), Chilean footballer
- Fernando López (Spanish footballer) (born 1983), Spanish footballer
- Fernando López (Mexican footballer) (born 1984), Mexican football defender
- Fernando López (rugby union), Argentine-born Spanish rugby union player
