= Branwen (film) =

1995 film

- Directed by: Ceri Sherlock
- Written by: Ceri Sherlock
- Starring: Morfudd Hughes
- Music by: Pádraigín Ní Uallacháin
- Release date: 1995
- Running time: 94 minutes
- Country: United Kingdom
- Language: Welsh

Branwen is a 1995 British Welsh-language drama film directed by Ceri Sherlock. The film was selected as the British entry for the Best Foreign Language Film at the 68th Academy Awards, but was not accepted as a nominee.

== Summary ==
Branwen is a language campaigner who can speak both Welsh and Irish. She is the sister of Mathonwy, a member of the British army, and is married to Kevin, who is an IRA member. The film reveals the powerful interrelationships between love, religion, politics, the IRA and the British army.

== Cast ==
- Morfudd Hughes as Branwen Roberts
- Richard Lynch as Kevin McCarthy
- J. O. Roberts as Y Parch / Llion Roberts
- Robert Gwyn Davin as Mathonwy Roberts
- Allin Elidyr as Peredur Roberts

== See also ==
- List of submissions to the 68th Academy Awards for Best Foreign Language Film
- List of British submissions for the Academy Award for Best Foreign Language Film
