= Themo Lobos =

- Born: Themístocles Nazario Lobos Aguirre; December 3, 1928 San Miguel, Chile
- Died: July 24, 2012 (aged 83) Valparaíso, Chile
- Area: Cartoonist
- Pseudonym: Themo Lobos
- Notable works: Mampato; Alaraco; Máximo Chambónez

Themístocles Nazario Lobos Aguirre (December 3, 1928 – July 24, 2012), better known as Themo Lobos, was a Chilean cartoonist. He created the characters Máximo Chambónez, Ferrilo, Nick Obre, and Alaraco, with his most famous work being Mampato, a character first developed, briefly, by Eduardo Armstrong and Óscar Vega; Lobos then wrote and illustrated his adventures from 1968 to 1978. He was also the publisher of the comic-book Cucalón, which collected all his previous characters and stories.

== Biography ==
=== Childhood and early career ===
Themístocles Lobos was born in San Miguel, Santiago, Chile in 1928. He began drawing cartoons at age 7, at first copying other drawings, but at 12 he realized that he needed "to be original and begin to work on his own things". Themo Lobos' first inspirations and influences came from the children's magazine El Peneca, of which he was a great fan - the Quintín el Aventurero ("Quentin the Adventurer") strip in particular. His first art studies were at the Chilean Academy of Fine Arts, but he quit because the school was not what he had expected. He later studied at the Chilean School of Applied Arts, where in his spare time he created his first original characters, Ferrilo the Robot and Homero the Pilot. His first professional work was published in the newspaper La Nación in 1949, with his characters serving to promote advertising.

The following year, he got to work in El Peneca. He was later signed on to work as one of the assistants to Guido Vallejos on the famous Chilean comic-book Barrabases, where he created the characters Cicleto, Cucufato and Ñeclito. In the mid-1950s, he was signed on to work on the humor publication El Pingüino ("The Penguin"). For this magazine he introduced his first truly popular creation: Alaraco, a comic strip about an over-concerned and overreacting man (modeled on Lobos' own personality). The same decade saw his work appear in the magazines Pobre Diablo, Flash, Humor de Hoy and Humanoide.

=== Mampato magazine ===
Kilikilis and Golagolas (1968) was the first Mampato storyline fully written and illustrated by Themo Lobos (pictured: the later collected edition)

In 1968, Chilean artist Eduardo Armstrong introduced the children's magazine Mampato, a bi-weekly publication containing educational articles as well as prose stories and a number of Chilean and foreign comic strips, which was published by Editorial Lord Cochrane. The first episode of the titular Mampato comic series was initially written by Armstrong and illustrated by Óscar Vega, a renowned Chilean comics artist. It tells the story of a young Chilean boy who obtains a "space-time belt" and uses it to travel through time, seeking to experience history's greatest adventures. The character of Mampato was partly inspired by both Dennis the Menace by Hank Ketcham, and Goscinny and Uderzo's Astérix. Vega had just read an Astérix book, at the time little known in Latin America, and was very impressed with the work; he attempted to merge Dennis the Menace's physical appearance and Astérix' art style into Mampato. Themo Lobos was then very busy with his work for El Peneca, yet Armstrong offered him the chance to illustrate Mampato. At first, Lobos declined the offer, but after a while he accepted – quickly becoming close friends with Armstrong. Lobos began drawing the series from the third chapter of Mampato's first adventure. While doing the illustrations, he mentioned to Armstrong that he was uncomfortable working with a script he had not written. Armstrong then decided to give Lobos free reins for the creation of stories and characters in all subsequent Mampato comics. For the remainder of the first storyline and, in full instalments since the second Mampato adventure ("Kilikilis and Golagolas"), the series was entirely written and illustrated by Lobos (save for a few storylines by Vega) and the magazine went on to become highly popular and successful with Chilean youth, at its peak selling roughly 100,000 copies per issue and changed its schedule to weekly in April 1971.

Mampato and the whole Chilean comics industry were affected by the 1973 coup d'état against Salvador Allende's government, led by Augusto Pinochet on September 11. Eventually, many comics ceased publication and also, in November of the same year, Eduardo Armstrong died from cancer at age 41.

Since 1973, Lobos encountered problems in producing the Mampato strip. Some people took issue with certain stories such as Los Tres ("The Three"), a.k.a. El Árbol Gigante ("The Giant Tree"), where Mampato fights mutants ruled by a character called Ferjus, the leader of a tyrannical dictatorship. Lobos commented on this particular storyline, explaining that he came up with it before the coup so it was not an attempt to satirize the then-current government. Most importantly, Lobos believed, it would be wrong to turn children's comics into political commentary.

Amid the country's tense situation, Mampato magazine ceased publication in January 1978.

During the publication period of 1968 – 1978, Lobos produced 25 complete Mampato storylines and the magazine was the main publication venue for other Chilean comics artists in addition to other works by Lobos, such as Máximo Chambónez, a comic strip originally seen in Barrabases but which became more popular while appearing on Mampato.

=== Hiatus and Cucalón ===
First issue of Cucalón (1986)

After Mampato's abrupt end in 1978, certain stories and art by Lobos were left incomplete. Around this time, many of his colleagues, assistants and friends were exiled or left the country, but he decided to stay. Until 1986, Lobos worked with very small or foreign publishers as well as illustrating promotional material for foreign properties such as the Smurfs and Super Friends.

In 1983, the Chilean TV show Jappening Con Ja staged a live-action sketch of his comic strip, Alaraco, starring comedian Fernando Alarcón. The recurring sketch became very popular across the country and rekindled interest in Themo Lobos comics.

In 1986, Themo Lobos gathered the funds and rights needed to create a new publication called Cucalón. This was a comic-book which collected all of Lobos' output from all the magazines that he had worked in his career, joined by new and previously unpublished material. Cucalón was very well received in Chile and ran for 48 issues until 1993, with most of Lobos' material being covered during the run.

=== Later years ===
In 1996, Ediciones Dolmen began its publication of Mampato's adventures in the comic album format, with recolored art and new covers, which have been sold in South America and Europe. In 2002, the movie Ogu and Mampato in Rapa Nui was released, an animated motion picture by Chilean animation studio Cine Animadores, based on the storyline known as "Mata-ki-te-rangui".
