= Cucalón (comic strip) =

Chilean comics series

Cucalón (Spanish for "pith helmet") is a Chilea comic series created by Themo Lobos, containing complete Mampato adventures (first seen in serialized form in the magazine also called Mampato), as well as other characters and stories.

The main series tells the adventures of Chilean boy Mampato, whom one day receives a telepathic message from an alien called Xseturlz (Xsé), asking for help. Mampato saves Xse's life and they both travel to planet Xagus, where Xse's race is suffering the presence of another evil alien race, called the Verdines ("Greenies"). After many adventures including a time travel to Earth's Roman Empire, they win the battle and take back control of Xse's planet. The king of Xagus offers Mampato any reward he would like. He asks for a ride back home but he gets something more: the "space-time belt", the fantastic device that allows travel to anywhere in time and space.

The first journey that Mampato takes is back to the prehistoric period, where he meets Ogú, a strong caveman. They become close friends, and their many adventures in different times and places make up most of the series.

In another adventure, Mampato goes forward to the 40th century, where he meets another recurring character: Rena, a beautiful girl with psychic abilities.

In 2002, some 30 years after the character's creation, a movie was made: Ogu and Mampato in Rapa Nui, based on one of the many adventures, and also being the first Chilean animated movie.
