= Papelucho =

Fictional character

First edition (publ. Rapa Nui S.A)

Papelucho is the main character in a series of children's books created by Chilean writer Marcela Paz. Twelve books were published between 1947 and 1974. The series became a classic among books for children in Chile.

The books are written in the form of diaries by the title character, a middle-class, eight-year-old Chilean boy in Santiago. Papelucho is able to find interest and humour in everyday life, and does this by means of an exuberant fantasy, a strong sense of observation and ridicule, and highly developed originality and creativity. In this respect it shows similarity with other widely read works of European children's literature, which also depict the adventures of children's everyday life, such as Goscinny and Sempé's Le petit Nicolas series, Richmal Crompton's Just William series, and Elena Fortún's Celia books.

The first book of the series, Papelucho, was published in 1947, after it won an award in a contest arranged by a young Chilean publishing house, Rapa Nui. The illustrations were by Yolanda Huneeus, a sister of the author. The book very quickly became a bestseller in Chile and one edition followed another. Eleven books followed; the last one appeared in 1974: Am I Dys-Lazy?

The sales of the series, in all editions starting from 1947, summed in 2007 up to more than five million copies sold. It is listed as "recommended reading" at Chilean schools and is currently (2011) edited by Random House in Santiago, Chile.

== Awards ==
Chile's main award in letters, the Premio Nacional de Literatura, was given to Marcela Paz in 1982, a few years before her death in 1985. In 1968, Papelucho the Missionary was a candidate for the Hans Christian Andersen Award from the International Board on Books for Young People (IBBY) in Amrisville, Switzerland.

There are adaptations for the theater and as comics (2011).

== Translations ==
A French edition of the first book in the series came out in 1951 in the collection Rouge et Bleu (GP publishers, translated and adapted by G. Tyl-Cambier). The text was adapted and published with coloured illustrations as a large format book, which was very successful, 25,000 copies being rapidly sold and a second edition appearing two years later. In 1980 a new French edition appeared and survived several changes in the editing house: Bordas being succeeded by Pocket, then Havas Poche, until the end of the nineties.

The Japanese publishing house Kodansha published in 1972 a Japanese translation with drawings by Marcela Claro Huneeus, the author's daughter. A Greek edition was published by Kedros, Athens, 1984. And recently Anicia in Rome has published an Italian translation of four of the books.

There is also a bilingual Spanish-English edition, which was available in Chile at the end of 2006. The English translation was made by Linda Craddock, Ailsa Shaw and Jean Paul Beuchat. This translation doesn't include the last three books, unpublished at the time.

== Movie ==
Cine Animadores and Canal 13 Films released in 2007 the film Papelucho and the Martian, loosely based on the book of the same name.

== Comic book ==
Papelucho was also adapted into a comics series, drawn by Walter Carzon.

== Bibliography ==
The Papelucho series consists of 12 books published during the author's life, while 3 others were published posthumously, starting in 2017:

- Papelucho (1947)
- Papelucho Casi Huérfano (1951) (Papelucho the almost orphan ).
- Papelucho Historiador (1955) (Papelucho historian).
- Papelucho Detective (1956) (Papelucho detective).
- Papelucho en la Clínica (1958) (Papelucho at the hospital).
- Papelucho Perdido (1962) (Papelucho lost).
- Mi Hermana Ji, por Papelucho (1965) (My sister Ji, by Papelucho).
- Papelucho Misionero (1966) (Papelucho missionary ).
- Papelucho y el Marciano (1968) (Papelucho and the Martian).
- Mi Hermano Hippie (1971) (My hippie brother, by Papelucho).
- Papelucho en Vacaciones (1971) (Papelucho on Vacation).
- Papelucho ¿Soy Dix Leso? (1974) (Papelucho Am I dyslexic?, translated as Papelucho Am I dys-lazy?).
- Adiós Planeta, por Papelucho (2017) (Goodbye Planet, by Papelucho)
- Papelucho, Romelio y el Castillo (2017) (Papelucho, Romelio and the Castle) [The original manuscript had the title "Papelucho Doctor"]
- Mis cartas a Papelucho (2018) (My letters to Papelucho)
