= Fernando Lopes =

Fernando Lopes may refer to:

- Fernando Lopes (filmmaker) (1935–2012), Portuguese film director
- Fernando Lopes Alcântara (born 1987), Brazilian footballer
- Fernando Lopes-Graça (1906–1994), Portuguese composer and conductor
- Fernão Lopes (c. 1385–after 1459), Portuguese chronicler
- Fernão Lopes (soldier) (died 1545), first known permanent inhabitant of the remote Island of Saint Helena
- Fernando Lopes (swimmer) (born 1964), Angolan swimmer

== See also ==
- Fernando López (disambiguation)
