= Cameleon (film) =

1997 film

- Directed by: Ceri Sherlock
- Written by: Juliet Ace
- Starring: Daniel Evans
- Release date: 17 October 1997
- Running time: 90 minutes
- Country: United Kingdom
- Language: Welsh

Cameleon is a 1997 British drama film directed by Ceri Sherlock. The film was selected as the British entry for the Best Foreign Language Film at the 71st Academy Awards, but was not accepted as a nominee.

== Cast ==
- Daniel Evans as Elfed Davies
- Simon Fisher as Howell Thomas
- Aneirin Hughes as Delme Davies
- Phylip Hughes as David George
- Iris Jones as Hannah-Jane

== See also ==
- List of submissions to the 71st Academy Awards for Best Foreign Language Film
- List of British submissions for the Academy Award for Best Foreign Language Film
