= Goku (disambiguation) =

Goku is the main character in Dragon Ball media.

Goku may also refer to:

- Goku (footballer), a Spanish soccer player
- Goku (Monkey Typhoon), the main character in Monkey Typhoon manga and anime series
- Goku (Saiyuki) in the Saiyuki manga and anime series
- Goku (Yūyūki), a character in the Yūyūki video game
- The Japanese numeral for $10^{48}$
- Goku, a novel by Shimaki Kensaku
- Furinji Goku, the title character in the Goku Midnight Eye manga and anime series
- Goku Black, a character from Dragon Ball Super

== See also ==
- Son Goku (disambiguation)
- Gokū no Daibōken
- Gokū Gaiden! Yūki no Akashi wa Sì Xīng Qiú
- Dragon Ball Z: Goku RPG (series)
