= Disacode =

Japanese visual kei rock band

DISACODE
- Origin: Japan
- Genres: Rock
- Years active: 2007–present
- Labels: K-point
- Members: AKIRA; Shin; Marcy
- Past members: SATOSHI; Daichi
- Website: disacode.net

DISACODE is a Japanese three-member visual kei rock band formed in 2007.

== History ==
DISACODE was originally formed in January 2007, with female fashion model AKIRA as vocalist and the central focus. The band was dissolved at one point, however at that time AKIRA took over the band name and music composition.

In 2010, three new members were added to the band - Shin, Marcy and Daichi. Their first live concert together was on April 9, 2010. In July of the same year, their first album Akashic Records was released.

In 2011, the mini-album Kakkotsukezu ni wa Irarenai was released.

In 2012, the full album Ryuu no Hige wo Ari ga Nerau was released.

In March 2013, Daichi left the band. His spot is currently being temporarily filled by support members.

=== Band Name ===
The band name is a word that AKIRA came up with, referring to rock music that defies boundaries. It is made of three parts - "DIS", "A", & "CODE". "DIS" refers to the negative prefix used in English, and "CODE" refers to boundary lines. AKIRA wrote on her blog that it has a meaning of ignoring or pushing boundaries.

== Members ==
- AKIRA (born February 15) – vocals, lyrics (2007–present)
  - From Chiba prefecture.
  - Appears regularly in the alternative fashion magazines KERA (ケラ!) and KERA BOKU.
  - Appeared in the live-action film adaption of Ai Ore! as Naruse Kaoru, and in the stage adaptions of Sengoku Basara as Uesugi Kenshin.
- Shin (しんのすけ Shinnosuke) (born January 21) – bass (2010–present)
  - From Saitama prefecture.
- Marcy (まーしー Maashii) (born October 6) – drums (2010–present)
  - From Tochigi prefecture.

=== Support members ===
- YASU/Yanagi (柳 Yanagi) – guitar
  - Was one of the original members, under the name YASU.
  - Returned as a support member in 2013. Currently performs under the name Yanagi .
- TOSHI (鈴木俊彦 Suzuki Toshihiko) (Purple Days) – guitar

=== Former members ===
- SATOSHI – guitar (2007–?)
- Daichi (だいち Daichi) – guitar (April 2010–March 2013)
  - From Ibaraki prefecture.

== Discography ==
=== Singles ===
1. ARCO∞IRIS

=== Albums ===
1. Akashic Records (アカシックレコード) (July 2010)
2. Ryuu no Hige wo Ari ga Nerau (龍の髭を蟻が狙う) (August 4, 2012)
3. Sakura x Kuroku x Kuraku (サクラ×クロク×クラク) (April 9, 2014)

=== Mini-Albums ===
1. Kakkotsukezu ni wa Irarenai (カッコつけずにはいられない) (September 5, 2011)

=== DVDs and videos ===
1. DISACODE's Ensou-code PANIC! 1~4 (DISACODEの演奏コードPANIC！1～4)
2. DISACODE's Mousou-code (DISACODEの妄想こーど)
3. DISACODE's Gudaa-code (DISACODEのぐだあこーど)

=== Solo Activity ===
1. Aoki Tsuki Michite (蒼き月満ちて) (July 30, 2014) – AKIRA's solo major debut song, under Sony Records. To be used as the Black Butler: Book of Circus ending theme.

== Concerts and Events ==
=== 2014 Tour ===
For promotion of DISACODE's album Sakura x Kuroku x Kuraku, released on April 9, 2014, DISACODE went on an eight-city tour around Japan. The tour was titled Sakura x Kuroku Kuraku ~ Hyakki Yagyou 2014 Live Tour ~ and ran from April 19 to June 14. Cities included were Nagoya, Osaka, Sapporo, Fukuoka, Hiroshima, Utsunomiya, Sendai and Shibuya in Tokyo.

=== Overseas Events ===
- Expo 2010 Shanghai China – In June 2010, AKIRA performed at Shanghai's World Expo.
- JAPAN EXPO – In July 2013, AKIRA performed in Paris, France at JAPAN EXPO.
- Anime Matsuri – On June 12, 2014, it was announced that DISACODE would be making their first US debut at Anime Matsuri 2015 in Houston, TX.

She also did a concert in Honolulu, Hawaii, for Kawaii Kon 2015.
