= Dying to Divorce =

2021 film directed by Chloe Fairweather

- Directed by: Chloe Fairweather
- Produced by: Sinead Kirwan
- Edited by: Paul Dosaj and Andrea Quadrado
- Release date: 8 March 2021
- Running time: 80 minutes
- Country: United Kingdom
- Language: Turkish

Dying to Divorce (Turkish: Ölümüne Boşanmak) is a 2021 British documentary film directed by Chloe Fairweather. It was selected as the British entry for the Best International Feature Film at the 94th Academy Awards.

== Synopsis ==
Ipek is part of a group of activists fighting to protect Turkish women against abuse and murder, by putting violent men behind bars. As femicides soar and Turkish society starts to fall apart, Ipek and her clients risk everything for their freedom.

More than one in three Turkish women have experienced domestic violence and the number of femicides is rising. But some Turkish women are fighting back. Ipek Bozkurt, a courageous lawyer, is determined to challenge this misogynistic trend by putting abusive men behind bars.

== Reception ==
On Rotten Tomatoes, the documentary holds an approval rating of 100% based on 7 reviews, with an average rating of 7.5/10. It's won several awards including two UK BAFTAs.

== See also ==
- List of submissions to the 94th Academy Awards for Best International Feature Film
- List of British submissions for the Academy Award for Best International Feature Film
