= Eldra =

2003 film

- Directed by: Timothy Lyn]
- Written by: Manon Eames
- Starring: Iona Jones
- Release date: 17 January 2003
- Running time: 80 minutes
- Country: Wales
- Language: Welsh

Eldra is a 2003 Welsh drama film directed by Timothy Lyn. It was selected as the British entry for the Best Foreign Language Film at the 75th Academy Awards, but it was not nominated.

== Cast ==
- Iona Jones as Eldra
- Rhys Richards as Ernest
- Leisa Mereid as Edith

== See also ==
- List of submissions to the 75th Academy Awards for Best Foreign Language Film
- List of British submissions for the Academy Award for Best Foreign Language Film
