= FireDancer =

2002 film

- Directed by: Jawed Wassel
- Written by: Jawed Wassel
- Produced by: Khaled Wassel; John G. Roche; Kate Wood
- Starring: Baktash Zaher; Mariam Weiss; Yunis Azizi; Omar Arzo
- Cinematography: Bud Gardner
- Edited by: Lizzie Donahue; Jeff Marcello
- Music by: Wayne Sharpe
- Production company: Columbia
- Release date: May 9, 2003
- Running time: 79 minutes
- Country: United States
- Language: English

Fire Dancer is a 2002 film directed by Afghan-American film director Jawed Wassel. It was the first Afghan film to be submitted for an Academy Award.

== Plot ==
Haris, an artist from Afghanistan, falls in love with Laila, a New York fashion designer.

== Cast ==
- Baktash Zaher as Haris
- Mariam Weiss as Laila
- Yunis Azizi as Rustum
- Omar Arzo as Farhad
- Atia Jewayni as Laila's mother
- Freshta Sadeed as Parwanah

== See also ==
Submissions for the 75th Academy Award for Best Foreign Language Film.

Fire dancer Original artwork by Dave Matthews, a logo that has become a unique representation of the Dave Matthews Band.
