= Fernando López (Chilean footballer) =

Chilean footballer (born 1980)

Personal information
- Full name: Fernando López Flores
- Date of birth: 29 January 1980 (age 46)
- Place of birth: Santiago, Chile
- Height: 1.75 m (5 ft 9 in)
- Position: Right-back

Senior career*
Years	Team	Apps	(Gls)
2003–2006	Palestino		
2004	→ Cobreloa (loan)		
2007	Everton		
2007	O'Higgins		
2008–2009	Ñublense		
2010–2012	Santiago Morning		
2013	San Marcos de Arica		
- * Club domestic league appearances and goals as of 18 March 2010

Fernando López Flores (born 29 January 1980) was a Chilean footballer.

He played for Cobreloa.

== Honours ==
=== Club ===
Cobreloa

- Primera División de Chile (1): 2004 Clausura
