= Son Goku =

Son Goku or Son-Goku may refer to:

- Monkey King or Sun Wukong, the main character of the 16th century novel Journey to the West, also known as Son Goku in Japan
- Son Goku, the main character of the Dragon Ball franchise
- Son Goku (band), a German rock band
- Son Goku (Saiyuki), a main character in the Saiyuki manga and anime series
- Son Goku (wrestler), ring name of Japanese professional wrestler Masa Takanashi (born 1983)
- Monkey Sun, a 1959 Japanese film directed by Kajirō Yamamoto
- Son Goku, the main character in the Alakazam the Great anime film
- Son Goku, a character in the Inuyasha anime television series

== See also ==
- Goku (disambiguation)
