= Cine Animadores =

Chilean animation film studio

- Company type: Animation film studio
- Industry: Media and Entertainment
- Founded: January 6, 1989
- Headquarters: Chile
- Key people: Alejandro Rojas
- Products: Animated feature films, TV Commercials, Animated Series, Flash animation
- Website: www.cineanimadores.com

Cine Animadores (styled as CineAnimadores) is an inactive Chilean animation film studio. One of the few full-based animation studios in the country and Latin America, Cine Animadores worked in his first years with TV commercials and later in the final years of the 1990s they started to work on music videos, animated TV series, Flash animation and animated feature films, with the creation of Ogu and Mampato in Rapa Nui, the first modern feature-length animated movie of Chile in 2002.

== History ==
Founded in 1989, Cine Animadores was originally created as a advertising company specialized in hand-drawn animation for TV commercials exclusively for the Chilean television.

Years later, Cine Animadores released in 1997 his first non-TV commercial work, the music video of La Torre de Babel by the Chilean group Los Tres. The traditional animated video was praised by critics and Los Tres fans and is considered as one of the most classic music videos created in Chile.

After this work, Cine Animadores make an agreement with Themo Lobos for the production of Ogu and Mampato in Rapa Nui. Released in 2002, the film was considered "historic" in Chile because although the film isn't the first featured animated production made in Chile, is the second in the history of Chilean cinema since Alfredo Serey's 1921 film La Trasmisión del Mando Presidencial. (English: The Transmission of Presidential Control) and is considered as the first "modern" feature-length animated film of the country. The film got very good to decent reviews by critics and was submitted as a nominated for the Academy Award for Best Foreign Language Film in 2002.

Since then, Cine Animadores has continued his production on animated movies and now TV series for the Chilean channel Canal 13 and also animated commercials for Disney, Peanuts and The Simpsons.

== Featured projects ==
=== Films ===
#	Title	Release date	Director
1	Ogu and Mampato in Rapa Nui	June 27, 2002	Alejandro Rojas
2	Papelucho and the Martian	May 17, 2007	Alejandro Rojas
3	Selkirk, the real Robinson Crusoe	February 2, 2012	Walter Tournier

== Television ==
=== TV Series ===
- I-Pop (2004)

== Music ==
=== Music Videos ===
- La Torre de Babel by Los Tres (1997)

== Internet ==
=== Flash Series ===
- El Santos vs. la Tetona Mendoza (2003, based on an original Mexican comic strip)
- Johnny Bravo (flash shorts for Cartoon Network Europe)
