= Fernando López (Spanish footballer) =

Spanish footballer

Personal information
- Full name: Fernando López Fernández
- Date of birth: 22 June 1983 (age 43)
- Place of birth: Madrid, Spain
- Height: 1.92 m (6 ft 3 1/2 in)
- Position: Goalkeeper

Youth career
- Atlético Madrid

Senior career*
| Years | Team | Apps | (Gls) |
| 2002–2003 | Livingston | 0 | (0) |
| 2003–2004 | Rayo Vallecano | 0 | (0) |
| 2004–2005 | Las Palmas B | | |
| 2005–2006 | Linares | 3 | (0) |
| 2006–2008 | Córdoba B | 17 | (0) |
| 2008–2009 | Córdoba | 2 | (0) |
| 2009–2010 | Košice | 14 | (0) |
| 2010 | Atlético Baleares | 15 | (0) |
| 2011 | Lucena | 0 | (0) |
| 2011–2012 | Košice | 7 | (0) |
| 2012–2016 | Coruxo | 85 | (0) |
| 2016–2020 | Porriño Industrial | 81 | (0) |
- * Club domestic league appearances and goals

Fernando López Fernández (born 22 June 1983) is a Spanish former professional footballer who played as a goalkeeper.

== Playing career ==
He signed for Scottish side Livingston in 2002 on a one-year deal. However, he left the club after one season without making a single first team appearance.
