= The Warrior (2001 British film) =

2001 film

- Region 2 DVD cover
- Directed by: Asif Kapadia
- Written by: Asif Kapadia; Tim Miller
- Produced by: Bertrand Faivre
- Starring: Irrfan Khan
- Cinematography: Roman Osin
- Edited by: Ewa J. Lind
- Music by: Dario Marianelli
- Distributed by: FilmFour Distributors (United Kingdom); Senator Film (Germany); Océan Films (France)
- Release dates: 23 September 2001 (SSFF); 3 May 2002 (United Kingdom); 18 June 2003 (France)
- Running time: 86 minutes
- Countries: United Kingdom; India; Germany; France
- Language: Hindi
- Budget: £2.5 million

The Warrior is a 2001 film by British filmmaker Asif Kapadia. It stars Irrfan Khan as Lafcadia, a warrior in feudal Rajasthan who attempts to give up the sword. The film is in Hindi and was filmed in Rajasthan, India. The film is credited with convincing Khan to not give up on his acting career.

The Warrior is the story of spiritual transformation of a cruel warrior Lafcadia. The film takes place in both Rajasthan and the Himalayas. Kapadia began work on the film within a year of graduating from the Royal College of Art, with the film being a coproduction between the UK, Germany and France. At the BAFTA Awards, it won the Alexander Korda Award for Best British Film.

The film was shortlisted as the UK's official entry for the Academy Award for Best Foreign Language Film but was disqualified by the Academy of Motion Picture Arts and Sciences as the film did not take place in, nor was it filmed in a language indigenous to the United Kingdom. Britain's official Oscar selection ultimately went to the Welsh-language film Eldra.

== Plot ==
Lafcadia (Irrfan Khan) is a warrior leading a band of warriors who are loyal to a ruthless and merciless tyrant in desert plains of feudal India. He lives with his son, a young boy who befriends a girl while playing. She is the daughter of a travelling cloth merchant who arrives at the village for trading. The girl makes him her honorary brother by tying a rakhi (ceremonial thread tied by sisters around their brothers' wrists) onto him and in return, he gifts her his amulet.

One day, the lord, angered by the failure of a village to pay their harvest tax, orders Lafcadia and his band to raze the village. His sword-wielding and horse-riding armed men enter the village and proceed to burn it down, pillaging it and massacring its inhabitants. Lafcadia attempts to kill a girl trying to flee with her mother but stops when he spots his son's amulet around her neck. It reminds him of his own child and makes him realise the barbarity of his deeds. He also has a brief vision of his ancestral homeland situated in the Himalayas. Lafcadia spares the girl's and her mother's life, thus disobeying his orders.

Guilt-ridden and remorseful of his violence, Lafcadia renounces his duty as a warrior and embarks on a journey to return to his homeland in the Himalayas with his son in search of solace. The feudal lord, upon learning about this development, feels betrayed and orders his second-in-command and Lafcadia's rival to kill him and bring his severed head by the next morning. Lafcadia evades capture but his son gets caught. The commander takes the head of some other man who resembles Lafcadia and coerces Lafcadia's son to identify it as that of his father to trick the lord. Lafcadia, disguised as a peasant, enters the palace gathering, hiding in a crowd of villagers, to save his son but his son is murdered by the commander while he helplessly watches from a distance in the crowd. He is temporarily immobilised due to the trauma of witnessing his only child's death and is saved by the palace blacksmith, a kind man who transports him far from the palace. Lafcadia, now on his own, begins the journey to his homeland on foot. The commander, who has now officially replaced Lafcadia as the band leader, is still paranoid that Lafcadia might come after him to avenge his son's murder. Therefore he embarks on his own manhunt to kill Lafcadia.

On his travels, Lafcadia meets an orphaned thief. The thief is a young man whose parents were killed in one of the village raids of Lafcadia's band when he was a kid. Unaware of Lafcadia's true identity, he befriends him but gets suspicious of him when he observes scars on his body and the villagers who recognise him and are scared of him. Nevertheless, he accompanies him throughout the journey. They meet an old blind woman who possesses psychic abilities and wants to pay a visit to the holy lake in the mountains. They meet a travelling cart driver who agrees to give them a ride. As they reach the mountains, they learn that a band of warriors have occupied a nearby village and are waiting for someone. Lafcadia heads to the village to confront them. The orphaned boy's suspicions are confirmed and he learns that Lafcadia used to be a warrior and is likely the murderer of his parents as well. The boy is initially distraught and parts ways with him, however recognizes that he is remorseful and has changed. Lafcadia reaches the village occupied by the warriors which has been deserted by the local inhabitants. The commander mocks him and tries to kill him but is stealthily ambushed by the boy who had been secretly following Lafcadia. Lafcadia gets hold of the commander and slits his throat killing him. Lafcadia and the boy have food at a local restaurant run by a woman and her daughter. The boy is hired by the woman as a waiter, fulfilling his dream of having a house, food and family.

Lafcadia collapses while climbing a snowy hill and wakes up in the cabin of the same little girl who had received his son's amulet. Her mother cooks him food and gives him warm clothes. Lafcadia while departing the cabin located in the same landscape as he had seen in his vision earlier, understands the deeper meaning of his vision and destiny. The blind old woman is shown worshipping at the holy lake and the movie ends with a scenic view of the mountains.

== Cast ==
- Irrfan Khan as Lafcadia
- Aino Annuddin as Biswas
- Noor Mani as Riaz, an orphaned thief
- Damayanti Marfatia as a blind woman

== Release ==
As pre-publicity the director attended a Q&A screening in Wood Green's Cineworld Cinema, commenting that it was good to be back at the shopping centre where he had spent so much time hanging out as a teenager.

Festival screenings include: London, Edinburgh, Rotterdam, Pusan, Gothenburg, Boston.
