= Marcela Paz =

Chilean writer (1902–1985)

Marcela Paz (February 28, 1902 – June 12, 1985) was the pen name of Esther Huneeus Salas de Claro, a Chilean writer. She also used the pen names of Paula de la Sierra, Lukim Retse, P. Neka and Juanita Godoy. She was a recipient of the National Prize for Literature.

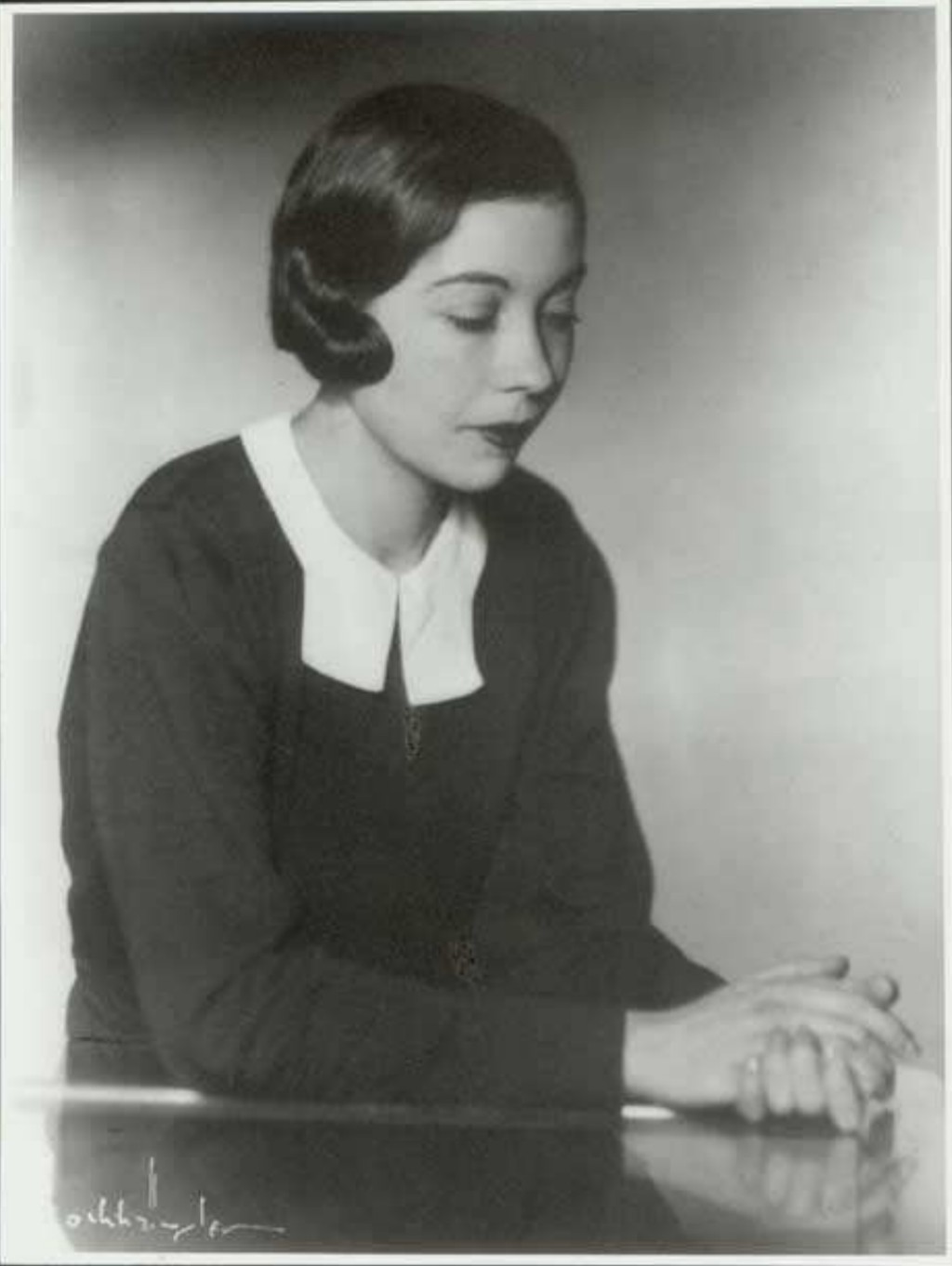
Marcela Paz (1902-1985)

== Early years ==
Marcela Paz was born in Santiago, Chile on February 28, 1902 (even though her biography indicates that she was born on February 29; however, 1902 was not a leap year).

She was born into a well-off family and was the second eldest of eight children of Francisco Huneeus Gana and María Teresa Salas Subercaseaux. Since her youth she found refuge in solitude and in imagination, particularly after the death of Anita, her older sister, when Ester was only 11 years old. This added to the absence of friends her own age.

Ester never went to a formal school but instead her education was left in charge of governesses. In 1929 she traveled to France, where during a few months she studied courses in the visual arts.

== Beginnings in literature ==
On her return to Chile, she slowly began her literary works, her work with sculptures, and her little known social work. Her timid appearance in literature was through magazines like Lectura, El Peneca, Ecran, Zig-Zag, Eva y Margarita, as well as in newspapers like La Nación, El Diario Ilustrado, El Mercurio y La Tercera. Ester Huneeus had begun to publish under the pseudonym Marcela Paz, which launched her fame. Previously she had published with other pseudonyms like Paula de la Sierra, Lukim Retse, P. Neka y Juanita Godoy.

In 1933 Ester published her first novel Tiempo, papel y lápiz which obtained a good reception from critics. The same year, contradicting her idea of not getting married, she married José Luis Claro.

== Papelucho ==
In 1947 Paz published her first book with her most famous character, Papelucho. Papelucho became a companion and an inspiration to generations of children and perhaps one of Chile's most well known humanized characters of the twentieth century. Between 1964 and 1967, she directed the Asociación Internacional del Libro Juvenil, the Chilean chapter of the International Board on Books for Young People (IBBY).

In 1968 she received a Hans Christian Andersen honour diploma. In 1979 she received the gold medal from the Instituto Cultural de Providencia. In 1982, she was awarded with the Premio Nacional de Literatura de Chile.

== Death and tributes ==
Marcela Paz died at age 83 on June 12, 1985 in Santiago, Chile. Her remains are in the Cementerio General de Santiago, patio 56.

On February 29(!), 2012, Google Chile honored Marcela Paz with a special Birthday Doodle, remarking "110º aniversario del nacimiento de Marcela Paz, fecha entregada por la familia de Marcela Paz" (Marcela Paz's 110th birthday, date given by Marcela Paz's family). Note: The year of 1902 was not a leap year. Therefore the date of February 29, 1902, did not exist.
