= Simon Scardifield =

British actor and playwright

Simon Scardifield is a British actor and playwright who trained at the Guildhall School of Music and Drama and with Philippe Gaulier, after reading Modern Languages at St John's College, Cambridge.

Scardifield was nominated for a UK Theatre Award in 2013, in the Best Performance category. Notable work as an actor includes Edward Hall's Propellor / Old Vic production of The Taming of the Shrew in 2007, Laurence Boswell's adaptation of Dostoevsky's The Double in 2012, Boswell's production of Lope de Vega's Punishment Without Revenge in 2013, Helena Kaut-Howson's Sons Without Fathers (a new version of Chekhov's Platonov) in 2013, Maria Aberg's RSC production of John Webster's revenge tragedy The White Devil at the Swan Theatre, Stratford-upon-Avon in 2014, Guy Jones' production of Joe White's acclaimed debut Mayfly at the Orange Tree Theatre in 2018. and As You Like It at Shakespeare's Globe in 2019. He is also the voice of Robert Muchamore's bestselling CHERUB series audiobooks.

Scardifield's writing credits include Ubykh which aired on BBC Radio 4 in 2012, adaptations of Danton's Death and Aeschylus' The Oresteia for BBC Radio 3 (2012 and 2014), an adaptation of Arthur Koestler's Darkness at Noon for BBC Radio 4 (2017)., an original play Also Sprach Zarathustra co-written with Andrew Day (2020), and an adaptation of Alfred Döblin's avant-garde novel Berlin Alexanderplatz to air in 2021 as the culmination of BBC R4's Electric Decade season. He has translated plays from French, Spanish and German for the Royal Court, the National Theatre, the Almeida, the Royal Shakespeare Company, the Young Vic and the Donmar Warehouse, and was responsible for the French and German dialect work with the London West End cast of War Horse. In 2017 he directed and co-wrote Shakespeare, Where Are You?, a show for young audiences staged at the Sam Wanamaker Playhouse at Shakespeare's Globe.
