= Mampato =

Comic strip

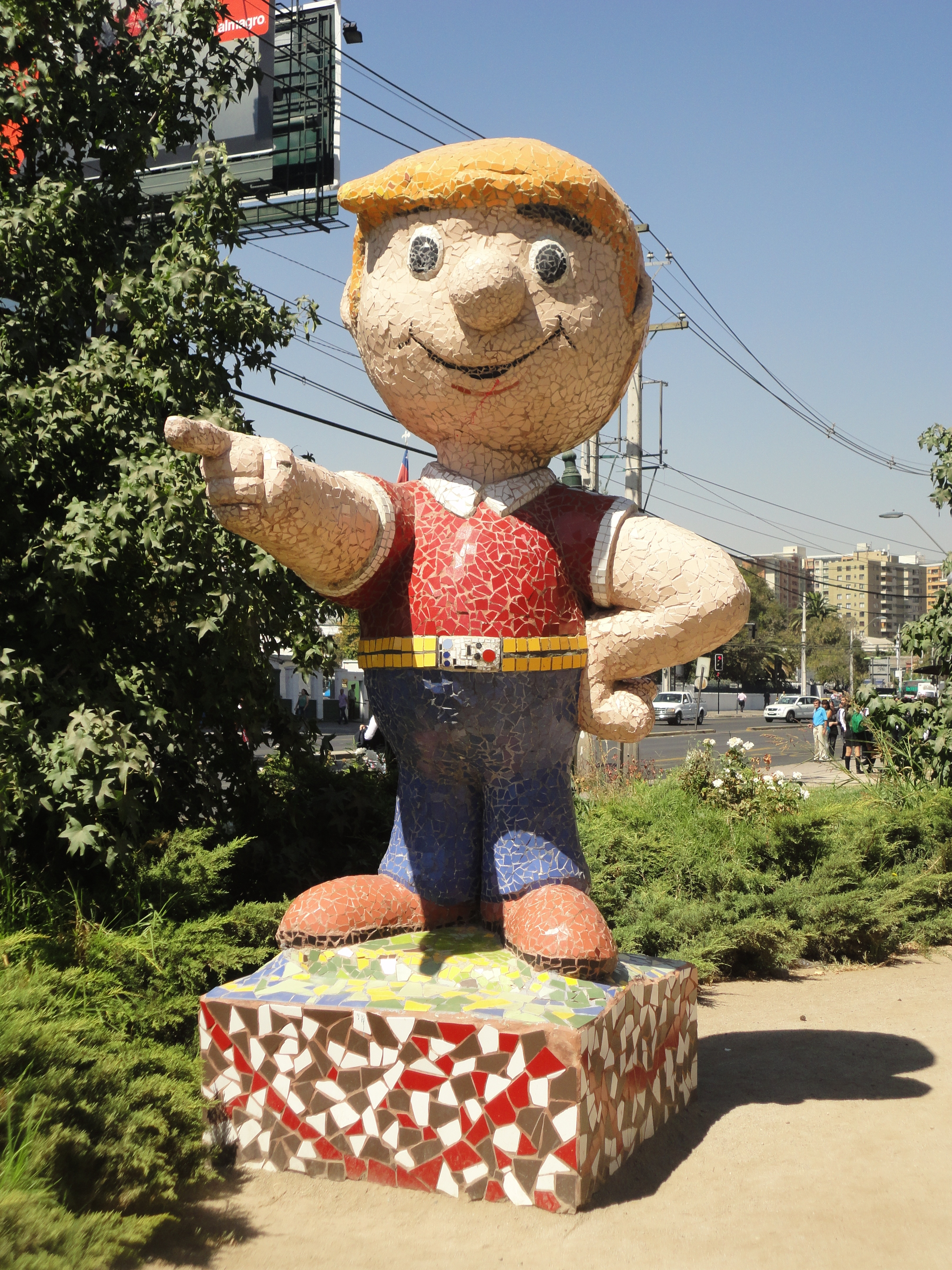
A sculpture of Mampato at Comics Park, San Miguel, Santiago de Chile

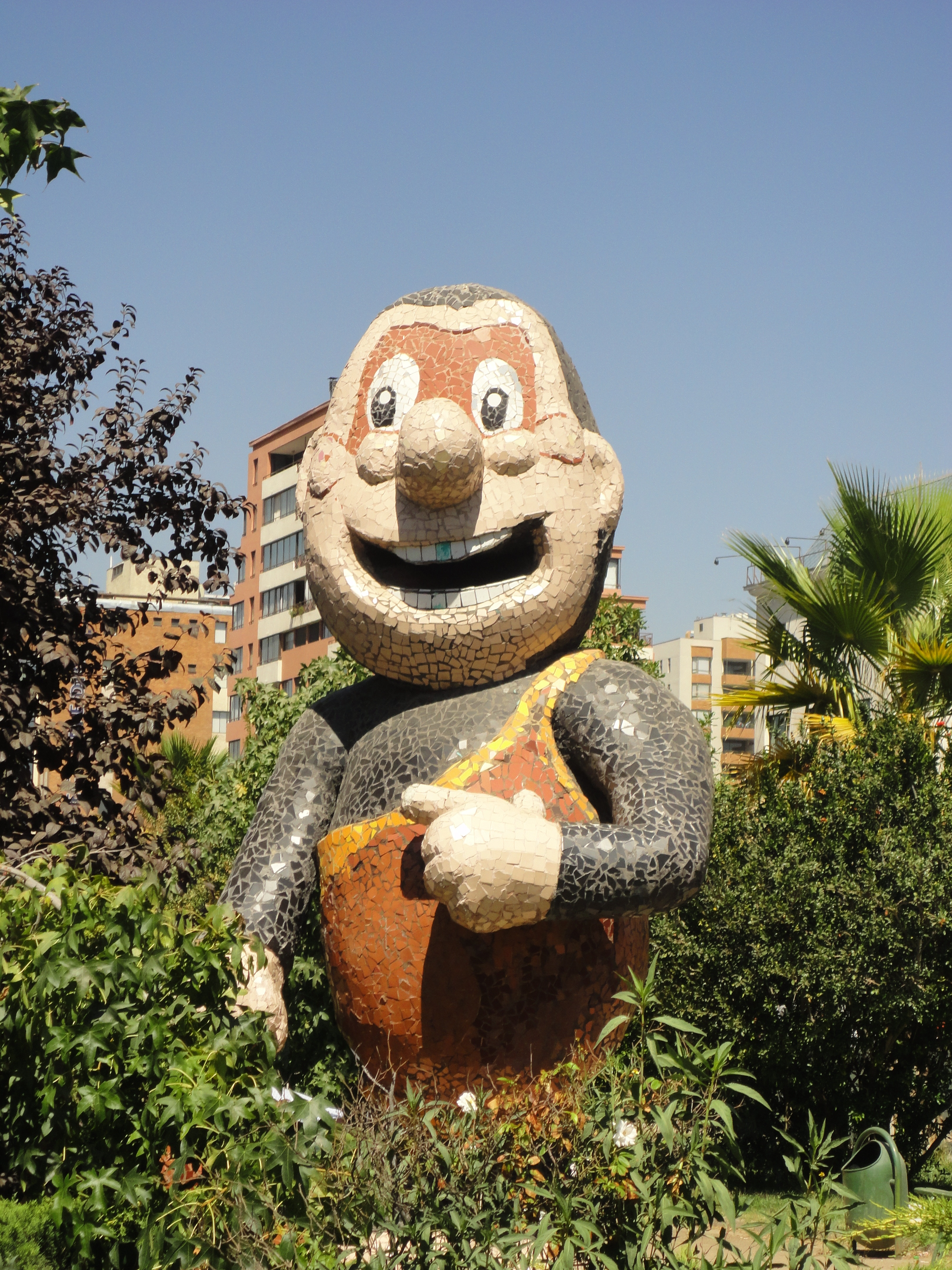
A sculpture of Ogú at Comic Park

Mampato is a Chilean adventure and science fiction comic strip created by cartoonist Eduardo Armstrong and illustrator Oskar. Since the third installment, the comic has been developed mainly by Themo Lobos. The comic strip follows the adventures of Mampato, a boy who saves a stranded alien named Xsé, and helps Xsé to save his home planet from the invasion of another alien species called the greenies and their cruel leader Mong. Mampato obtains a belt that allows him to travel through time and space. Using this power, Mampato travels through different time periods on Earth. During his travels, Mampato meets the prehistoric caveman Ogú and the 40th-century mutant telepath Rena, who accompany him on his adventures. His adventures are highly educative teaching the readers interesting facts about the time periods Mampato visits.

== History ==
Mampato was originally published in the children's magazine Mampato. Originally, Mampato was similar to Asterix, however when Themo Lobos took over the writing and art direction of the comic, he insisted on redesigning the characters, making Mampato a boy. Óscar Vega sporadically drew the comics (for example, "Mampato en el planeta maligno", ["Mampato on the evil planet"]) in Lobos' style.

Lord Cochrane publishing house, the original publisher of Mampato magazine, chose the name Mampato. The publisher already had a trademark on the name Mampato as a supplement to El Mercurio. The word "mampato" means "little frog" in Mapuche and refers to a breed of pony, Chilote horse; the supplement had stories about a short-legged chubby pony, which reflects Mampato's character design.

The magazine ran from 1968 to 1978. From 1986 to 1993, the adventures of Mampato were reprinted by Cucalón together with other comics by Themo Lobos.

== Adaptations ==
- 2002: Animated film Ogu and Mampato in Rapa Nui based on the 1998 strip Mata-ki-te-rangui.
- 2018: The premiere of the animated series The Adventures of Ogú, Mampato and Rena, marking the 50th anniversary of Mampato.
