= Iona Jones =

Welsh television executive

- Born: Haverfordwest, Pembrokeshire, Wales
- Education: University of Exeter
- Occupation: Television executive
- Years active: 1986–2010
- Employer(s): BBC Cymru Wales (1986–1995); S4C (1995–2000, 2003–2010); ITV Wales (2000–2003)
- Title: Chief Executive of S4C
- Term: 2005–2010
- Predecessor: Huw Jones
- Successor: Arwel Ellis Owen (acting)
- Children: 3

Iona Jones is a Welsh television executive, the former head of Welsh language channel S4C.

Born in Haverfordwest, Pembrokeshire, she was brought up in Lampeter, Ceredigion, before moving to Cardiff with her family when she was six. Jones graduated in economic and social history from Exeter University.

On graduation in 1986, she joined BBC Cymru Wales as a trainee journalist. She later became editor of the current affairs programme Taro Naw and daily news programme Newyddion, produced by the BBC for S4C. In 1995, Jones joined S4C as the director of corporate affairs. In 2000 she joined ITV Wales, where she represented Carlton Television's regional companies throughout the UK on the Communications Act 2003.

Jones was appointed Director of Programmes at S4C in 2003, and became Chief Executive in 2005, the fourth S4C CEO and first woman to hold the position. Jones left S4C in July 2010, after discussion over the future funding of S4C.

She has three children and lives in Cardiff.
