= Jawed Wassel =

Jawed Wassel (1959 – October 3, 2001) was an Afghan-American film director who made the film FireDancer, which was the first Afghan film to be submitted for an Academy Award. He was fatally stabbed on October 3, 2001, after getting into a dispute with another filmmaker, Nathan Powell, over earnings from the production of FireDancer.

== Career ==
Wassel was an aspiring filmmaker who was born in the city of Kabul, Afghanistan in 1958. He previously lived in Pakistan, Germany and France before entering the United States. His parents had urged him to flee to Pakistan from Afghanistan due to then ongoing invasion by the Soviet Union. He would continue his career by working in theater during his college years in the United States.

In the years following his graduation, Wassel expressed interest in creating a film. Upon meeting Nathan Powell in New York City in 1998, Wassel began the process of raising funds for his project—nearly $500,000—mainly consisting of contributions from Afghan immigrants, although many have laid claims that Powell was one of the main financial contributors, who would earn up to 30% of the profit. FireDancer was filmed mainly in and around New York and Washington D.C., and featured a cast primarily of Afghan descent, who Wassel recruited from George Mason University. However, some shots were filmed on location in Afghanistan and were confronted by Islamic fundamentalists who protested to disapprove of the appearance of certain female actresses. The film was to depict the lives of those who immigrated to the U.S. from Afghanistan and the many obstacles they face in day-to-day life. In his independent film, Wassel wanted to recount and incorporate the story of his youth as an immigrant from Soviet-invaded and Taliban-dominated Afghanistan to New York. He said, "The movie couldn't have been made anywhere else but in America. It's the one place where everybody has a chance."

FireDancer was not the only film project that Wassel worked on. He was also constructing a smaller documentary that would portray the displays of remembrance for the many victims who died in the September 11 attacks in 2001.

== Death ==
Towards the end of the film's production, Wassel attempted to convince Powell to accept a lesser stake of 10% of the gross earnings, in place of the 30% that he was initially promised. Powell quickly became enraged and impaled Wassel with a pool cue, then "stabbed Wassel 'several times' before dismembering his body with a hacksaw." On October 4, 2001, Wassel was expected at a film screening for his film in Manhattan. When he did not arrive to the screening location on 55th Street, his friends became worried and notified the local authorities. Powell chopped Wassel's body into pieces and stored them in boxes. The next day, Powell was stopped by a police officer who noticed his suspicious behavior and the blood-stained boxes containing Wassel's body.

Police charged Powell with the murder of Wassel, although he initially pleaded not guilty. Although it has been reported that Powell ended Wassel's life over logistics with FireDancer, one interview states that Powell's motivations were driven by his belief that Wassel "had contacts with the Taliban" and due to his alleged belief that Wassel made a trip to Afghanistan prior to the September 11 attacks. Powell pleaded guilty on August 18, 2003, and was sentenced to 25 years.

== Filmography ==
- FireDancer (2002)
