= Hyatt Regency Houston Downtown =

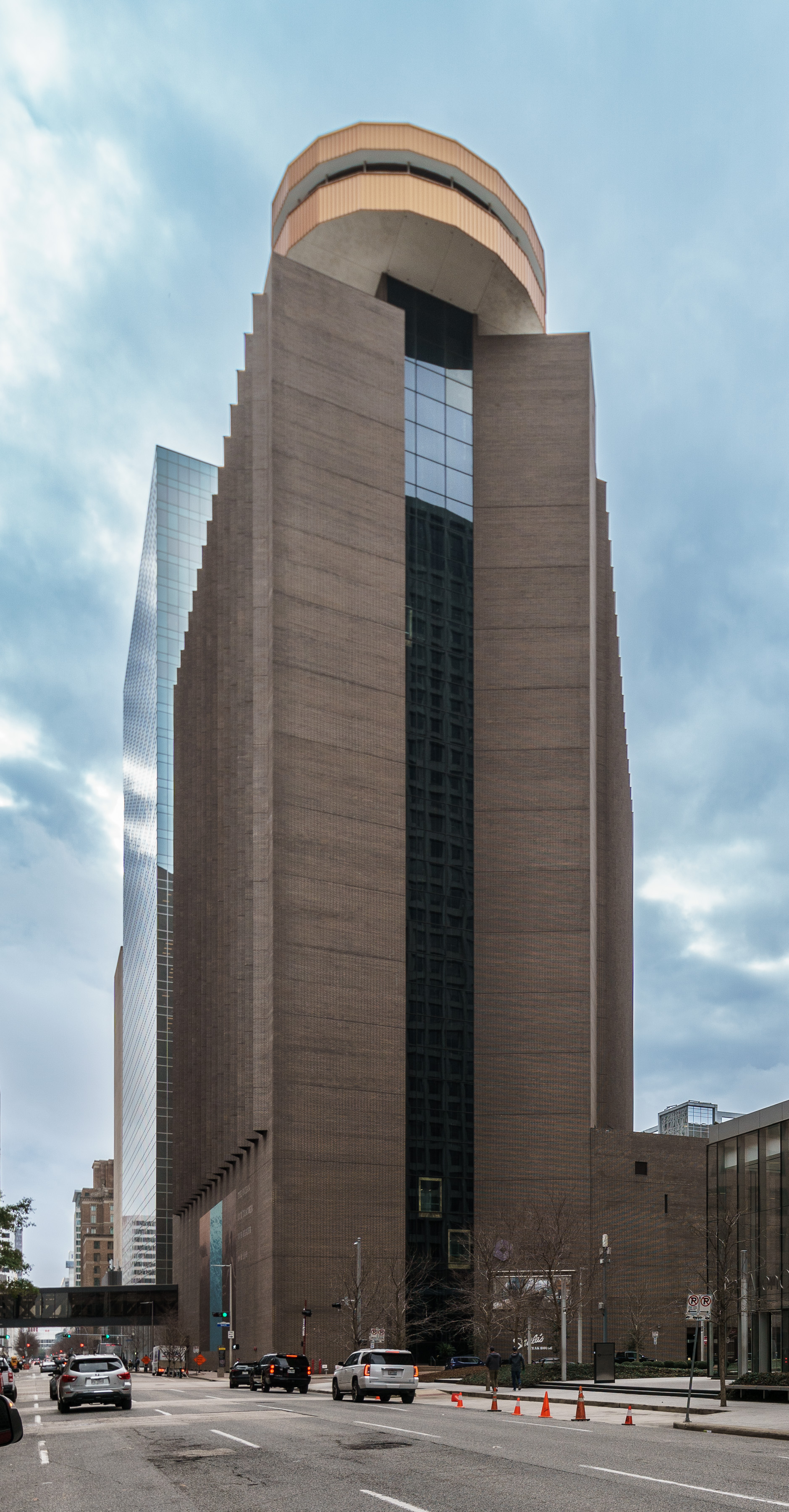
- Interactive map of the Hyatt Regency Houston Downtown area

General information
- Location: Houston, Texas; United States
- Coordinates: 29.75694°N 95.36934°W
- Opening: December 4, 1972
- Management: Hyatt Hotels Corporation

Technical details
- Floor count: 30

Design and construction
- Architect: JV III

Other information
- Number of rooms: 947 (total)
- Number of suites: 21
- Number of restaurants: 2
- Parking: Valet Parking/Garage

Website
- https://www.hyatt.com/hyatt-regency/en-US/hourh-hyatt-regency-houston-downtown

The Hyatt Regency Houston Downtown is a 30-story high-rise hotel located in downtown Houston, Texas, United States.

The hotel opened on December 4, 1972 as the Hyatt Regency Houston, part of the Hyatt hotel chain. It was designed by architectural firm JV III (a joint venture between firms Caudill Rowlett Scott, Neuhaus & Taylor, and Koetter, Tharp & Cowell). At 401 ft (122 m), Hyatt Regency Houston is the city's tallest hotel The hotel was, for many years, topped by a revolving restaurant known as "Spindletop". Today, it is used as function space. The hotel's 29-story atrium, one of the highest in Texas, was used as a filming location in the 1976 film Logan's Run.

Hyatt Regency Houston was a host hotel for the 1992 Republican National Convention, the 16th G7 Economic Summit in 1990, and the 1998 World Energy Congress. The hotel completed a $40 million renovation in 2008 that included all 947 guestrooms, a redesigned lobby bar, 64,000 square feet (5,900 m^{2}) of meeting space, and the addition of the only Shula's Steakhouse in Texas.

== See also ==
- Architecture of Houston
- List of tallest buildings in Houston
