= Mario Castañeda =

Mexican voice actor (born 1962)

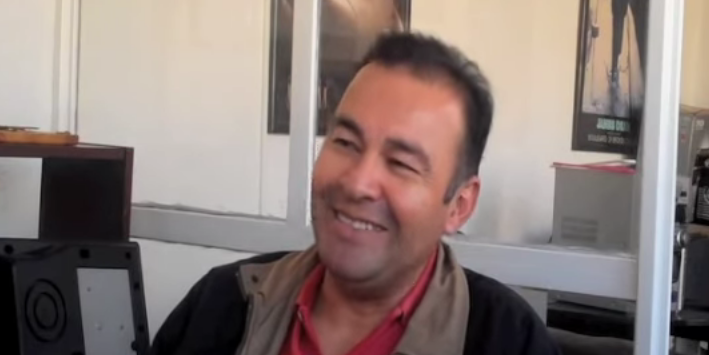
- Castañeda in 2010
- Born: Mario Cuitláhuac Castañeda Partida; June 29, 1962 (age 64); Irapuato, Guanajuato, Mexico
- Occupations: Voice actor, director
- Years active: 1983–present
- Spouses: Rommy Mendoza (m. 1987; div. 2002) Susana Melgarejo Franco (m. 2004)
- Children: Arturo; Carla; Sofia

Mario Cuitláhuac Castañeda Partida (Spanish pronunciation: [ˈmaɾjo kwiˈtlawak kastaˈɲeða paɾˈtiða]; born June 29, 1962), known professionally as Mario Castañeda, is a Mexican voice actor and dubbing director, known for his voice work in Japanese anime, such as adult Son Goku in the Latin American Spanish dub of Dragon Ball, as well as the dubbing voice of many actors in movies, including Jim Carrey, Jackie Chan and Bruce Willis.

== Early life and education ==
Castañeda was born on June 29, 1962 in Irapuato, Guanajuato, Mexico. When he was young, his parents moved to Mexico City where he resides currently. He studied drama in the Andrés Soler Institute from 1979 to 1982.

== Career ==
In June 1983, Castañeda started to work as a voice actor in Mexican dubs of several television series, including Diff'rent Strokes, The Powers of Matthew Star, and The Visitor. Castañeda has also done voice work in Japanese anime, such as adult Son Goku in the Latin American dub of Dragon Ball, as well as the dubbing voice of many actors in movies, including Jim Carrey, Jackie Chan and Bruce Willis.

Since 1997, he has frequently received invitations to attend a multitude of conferences and conventions focused on anime, video games, films, and series throughout virtually all of Latin America.

In the early 2000s, Mario co-founded Fogarty Studios alongside actor and director Adrián Fogarty, having previously been a partner at DAT (Doblaje Audio Traducción) during its early years. Their initial projects were productions for Disney Character Voices International, though they would cease collaborating with the company a few years later.

He was also the announcer for Boomerang in Latin America from 2001 to 2006. Additionally, he has been involved with TV Azteca as part of the on-air presence for Mexico’s Azteca 7 channel.

He held the position of Creative Director at SDI Media de México from March 1, 2013, until mid-2014.

Mario was honored by the Plaza de las Estrellas for his distinguished professional career; he left his handprints there on January 11, 2019, during a red-carpet ceremony held on the day of the Latin American premiere of Dragon Ball Super: Broly—an event organized by Plaza de las Estrellas and Tienda Puntos.

On June 8, 2020, he published his first book, Elegido por el doblaje. In 2021, he confirmed his participation in Los juegos Z, a special production by TV Azteca covering the Tokyo 2020 Olympic Games.

Mario has connected with other voice actor from around the world who portray Son Goku. On May 26, 2020, he met Pablo Domínguez —the voice of Son Goku in Spain since Dragon Ball Super— during a virtual gathering organized by Crunchyroll in Spanish. The two discussed their experiences voicing Son Goku and called for an end to fan disputes regarding the differences between the Spanish (Spain) and Latin American Spanish dubs.. On September 26, 2026, Mario also met and spent time with Masako Nozawa (the original Japanese voice of Son Goku), Sean Schemmel (the voice of Son Goku in the United States), and Ankur Javeri (the voice of Son Goku in India) at the Tokyo X 2026 event in Houston, Texas, USA. The event included a celebration for Nozawa’s 90th birthday, during which the actors shared anecdotes and performed a Kamehameha together.

== Notable roles ==
=== Anime dubbing ===
- Blue Submarine – Tokuhiro Iga
- Bakugan Battle Brawlers – Darkus Exedra, Darkus Razenoid.
- Dragon Ball - Son Goku (young), Colonel Silver, Pamput, Master Roshi (young), voice-over (Dragon Ball title in opening)
- Dragon Ball Z (serie, films and OVA's) - Son Goku (adult), Vegito (Goku's voice), Gogeta (Goku's voice), Bardock, Turles
- Dragon Ball GT (serie and OVA) - Son Goku (adult)
- Dragon Ball Z Kai: The Final Chapters - Son Goku (adult)
- Dragon Ball Super (serie and films) - Son Goku (adult), Black Goku, Bardock, Vegito (Goku's voice), Gogeta (Goku's voice)
- Dragon Ball Daima – Son Goku (adult)
- Dragon Ball Super: Beerus - Son Goku (adult)
- Saint Seiya – Sea Dragon Kanon (Poseidon and Hades Chapter Inferno - TV version)
- Los Caballeros del Zodíaco – Lune de Balrog (Hades Chapter inferno – DVD version)
- Naruto Shippuden – Hidan
- One Piece – Akainu/Sakazuki
- Sailor Moon – Neflyte
- Slam Dunk – Tatsuhiko Aota, Toru Hanagata.

=== Animation dubbing ===
- Anastasia – Dmitri
- MacGyver – MacGyver
- El Chavo – Don Ramón / Ñoño
- Iron Man – Tony Stark/Iron Man
- Spider-Man – Tony Stark/Iron Man
- Up – Alpha
- Cars 2 – Acer
- The Incredible Hulk – Tony Stark/Iron Man
- Demolition Man – Simon Phoenix
- The Mask – Stanley Ipkiss/La Máscara (Stanley Ipkiss/The Mask) and Ace Ventura
- Captain Planet – Capitán Planeta (Captain Planet)
- Yo Yogi! – Yogi Bear
- Harvey Birdman, Attorney at Law – Droopy
- Tom and Jerry Kids – Lobo/Droopy/Dripple
- Thomas & Friends – James the Red Engine (Seasons 13–onwards)
- Futurama – Zapp Branigan
- Bruce Almighty – Bruce Nolan
- The Wonder Years – Kevin Arnold (Adult)
- Boyz n the Hood – Ricky (Adult)
- Transformers – Glen Whitmann
- You, Me and Dupree – Carl
- Hannah Montana – Robbie Steward
- Dragonball Evolution – Goku
- Dueños de la Noche – Capt. Joseph "Joe" Grusinsky
- Anacondas: Trail of Blood – Scott
- The Avengers: Earth's Mightiest Heroes – Hank Pym
- Saw – Eric Matthews (DVD version)/Art Blank
- Handy Manny – Pat
