= Ceri Sherlock =

Welsh film director (born 1954)

Ceri Sherlock (born August 1954) is a Welsh theatre, film and television director.

Ceri Sherlock was educated at Ysgol Dewi Sant, a secondary school in St Davids, Pembrokeshire, and at Llandovery College, a private school in Carmarthenshire. He attended university at King's College, London and the University of Glamorgan, and as a Fulbright Scholar at the University of California, Los Angeles. He was a Judith E Wilson Visiting Fellow at the University of Cambridge and a Nipkow Fellow in Berlin.

He was a trainee director and director with Theatr Cymru and Welsh National Opera and held posts as Artistic Director of Actors' Touring Company and Theatrig.

In 1993 Sherlock directed Dafydd for BBC 2. In 1995, his Welsh-language film Branwen won the Best Film award at the Celtic Film Festival. His feature film Cameleon won a Golden Spire and a Golden Gate at the San Francisco Film Festival in 1999.

He was first Expert Advisor in Culture and Arts for the National Assembly of Wales from 2000 to 2002.

Sherlock was a commissioning editor at the Welsh language television channel S4C before joining the BBC as Commissioning Executive Arts (BBC Wales) and an executive producer (BBC4) in 2006. He is an honorary professor in drama at Kingston University and the University of Aberystwyth.

In 2010 he moved to Hong Kong, where he became a professor and Dean of Drama at the Hong Kong Academy for Performing Arts. In 2016, after being cleared of an accusation of sexual harassment, he resigned from his position.
