= Marina Huerta =

Argentinian theoretical physicist (born 1968)

- Born: Buenos Aires, Argentina
- Education: Universidad de Buenos Aires, Instituto Balseiro, Universidad Nacional de Cuyo
- Awards: New Horizons (2015); Dirac Medal (ICTP) (2024)
- Scientific career
- Fields: Theoretical physics, Quantum information, Quantum field theory
- Workplaces: Instituto Balseiro, CNEA and CONICET
- Thesis: (2000)
- Doctoral advisor: Guillermo Zemba and Rafael Montemayor

Marina Huerta (born 1968) is an Argentinian theoretical physicist and a physics professor. She is known for her work on quantum entropy in quantum field theory. She has provided a new interpretation of the Bekenstein bound. As of 2020, she has 29 peer-reviewed publications with more than 2000 citations.

In 2015 she won the New Horizons in Physics - Breakthrough Prize for "fundamental ideas about entropy in quantum field theory and quantum gravity". In 2024 she was awarded the Dirac Medal (ICTP) jointly with her husband Horacio Casini, Shinsei Ryu and Tadashi Takayanagi.

She researches quantum field theory and quantum information at the Centro Atómico Bariloche and the Argentinian research organization: CONICET. She is a professor at the Instituto Balseiro of the Universidad Nacional de Cuyo in Argentina where her lectures on special relativity have been filmed and are offered free of charge (in Spanish). The Strings School has published her lectures on entanglement entropy (in English).

== Biography ==
Marina Huerta was born in 1968 in Buenos Aires, Argentina. She studied at the Universidad de Buenos Aires (UBA) and then moved to the Instituto Balseiro. She obtained her Ph.D. in physics in the year 2000 after completing a doctoral dissertation on an effective description of the Quantum Hall Effect under the supervision of Guillermo Zemba and Rafael Montemayor.

In 2005 and then in 2014, she spent some time at Princeton's Institute for Advanced Study. On the 2014 visit, Huerta researched entanglement entropy which enlightens aspects of quantum field theory inaccessible with any other approach.

She was one of the organizers of the workshop 'Quantum Gravity in the Southern Cone' in 2019.

== Contributions to physics ==
Huerta's main contributions in theoretical physics are in geometric entropy in quantum field theory, holography, quantum gravity and quantum information theory. She uses interlacing entropy as an indicator of confinement and phase transitions. It is considered the natural order parameter for systems with topological order. Relative entropy's properties give rise to the Bekenstein dimension, energy levels in field theories and the generalized second law. She has provided a new interpretation of the Bekenstein bound using relative entropy and distinguishability of states.

== Selected publications ==
- On the RG running of the entanglement entropy of a circle. In: Physical Review D. Band 85, 2012, S. 125016
- Towards a derivation of holographic entanglement entropy. In: Journal of High Energy Physics (JHEP). 1105 (2011) 036
- Entanglement entropy in free quantum field theory. In: Journal of Physics A. Band 42, 2009, S. 504007, Arxiv
- A Finite entanglement entropy and the c-Theorem. In: Physics Letters B. Band 600, 2004, S. 142–150
