= A Slice of Life (short story) =

1926 short story by P. G. Wodehouse

- Short story by P. G. Wodehouse
- Country: United Kingdom
- Language: English
- Genre: Comedy

Publication
- Publisher: Strand (UK); Liberty (US)
- Media type: Print (Magazine)
- Publication date: August 1926 (UK); 7 August 1926 (US)

"A Slice of Life" is a short story by the British comic writer P. G. Wodehouse. A part of the Mr. Mulliner series, the story was first published in the UK in 1926 in The Strand Magazine, and appeared almost simultaneously in Liberty in the United States. It also appears in the collection Meet Mr. Mulliner. The main character in this story, Wilfred Mulliner, plays off-stage parts in "Mulliner's Buck-U-Uppo".

== Plot ==
Wilfred Mulliner, the inventor of Mulliner's Magic Marvels, a set or creams and lotions that help "alleviate the many ills to which the flesh is heir", falls in love with Angela Purdue and recommends Mulliner's Raven Gypsy Face-Cream to help her keep her sunburn on. Angela fears that her guardian, Sir Jasper ffinch-ffarrowmere, will not approve of the marriage and her fears seem to be realized when the guardian arrives at Wilfred's home with a message from Angela calling the engagement off. Wilfred suspects the work of the dastardly baronet and being a man of action sets forth for Yorkshire where the baronet lives at ffinch Hall and, while wandering around the grounds at night, he hears a woman sobbing.

Within a week, Wilfred enters the house as a valet (he bribes Sir Jasper's valet and replaces him as his cousin) disguised in a red wig and blue spectacles. Soon after entering the house he follows Sir Jasper carry a tray of food to a room at the top of the house. Convinced that Angela is being held in the room against her will, he resolves to rescue her but is unable to find a key in the baronet's room and has no idea how to get hold of it. Over the next few days, he worries, loses weight, and Sir Jasper, who has a weight problem of his own (he can't lose it) decides to get an indoor Turkish cabinet bath inside which he gets stuck.

"First, I must have the key." Wilfred demands the key to Angela's room as the price for releasing the baronet. "Give me the key, you Fiend," he cries. "ffiend," corrects Sir Jasper, automatically. To Wilfred's surprise, it turns out that the key is not with the baronet but with Angela. She refuses to let him in because his suntan cream has turned her piebald.

Mulliner's Snow of the Mountains Lotion fixes the piebald-ness, Mulliner's Reduc-O takes care of Sir Jasper's weight problem, Mulliner's Ease-o relieves the butler's lumbago, and the story concludes, with the characters happy.

== Publication history ==
The story was illustrated by Charles Crombie in the Strand. Wallace Morgan illustrated the story in Liberty. "A Slice of Life" was published in The Magazine of Fantasy & Science Fiction (US) in June 1955.

The 1932 collection Nothing But Wodehouse, edited by Ogden Nash and published in the US by Doubleday, Doran & Company, included the story. "A Slice of Life" was collected in the Mulliner Omnibus, published by Herbert Jenkins in the UK in 1935, and in the second edition titled The World of Mr. Mulliner, published by Barrie & Jenkins in 1972. It was included in the 1960 collection The Most of P. G. Wodehouse, published by Simon and Schuster, New York.

== Adaptations ==
The story was adapted for radio in 2002 as part of a series with Richard Griffiths as Mr Mulliner. The cast also included Matilda Ziegler as Miss Postlethwaite, Angela, and a cook, Peter Acre as a Port and Sir Jasper, Martin Hyder as a Light Ale and Jenkins, David Timson as a Pint of Stout and Murgatroyd, and Tom George as a Small Bitter and Wilfred. It first aired on BBC Radio 4 on 4 December 2002.

== See also ==
- An omnibus collection of Mr. Mulliner stories at Standard Ebooks
- List of Wodehouse's Mr Mulliner stories
