= The Truth About George =

1926 short story by P. G. Wodehouse

- Short story by P. G. Wodehouse
- Country: United Kingdom
- Language: English
- Genre: Comedy

Publication
- Publisher: Strand (UK); Liberty (US)
- Media type: Print (Magazine)
- Publication date: July 1926 (UK); 3 July 1926 (US)

"The Truth About George" is a short story by the British comic writer P. G. Wodehouse. A part of the Mr. Mulliner series, the story was first published in July 1926 in Strand Magazine, and appeared almost simultaneously in Liberty in the United States. It also appears in the collection Meet Mr. Mulliner.

== Plot Overview ==
George Mulliner, a nephew of Mr. Mulliner, was cursed with a terrible stammer but was not terribly concerned about it until he fell in love with Susan Blake, the daughter of the vicar of East Wobsley, the Worcestershire village in which they lived. Determined to get rid of the stammer, he visits a specialist in London who advises him to go and speak to three perfect strangers each day as a confidence building measure. George decides to do this immediately on the train back to London. Unfortunately, the first person he meets also stammers and to stammer back at this man 'would obviously be madness'. The second person he meets turns out to be a lunatic runaway from the local asylum who thinks he is the Emperor of Abyssinia and wishes to perform a human sacrifice with George playing the lucky lamb. George manages to escape and takes refuge under a bench seat in a railway carriage. A woman takes a seat in the same compartment, and when George emerges from under the bench and tries to speak to her, she assumes that George must be the escaped lunatic. When George, unable to speak, decides to sing instead she faints. When a thermos falls and shatters as the train passes over some points, she leaps up and pulls the emergency cord, bringing the train to a halt. When a host of rustics appear, George decides to remove himself and does so at a high speed followed by twenty-seven rustics headed by a bearded man with a pitchfork.

Late that night, a bedraggled George appears at the vicarage and presents himself to Susan Blake. Cured of his stammer, he proposes and she accepts. The mob arrives and George removes himself again at top speed but his stammer is cured for ever.

== Publication history ==
"The Truth About George" was illustrated by Charles Crombie in the Strand. It was illustrated by Wallace Morgan in Liberty.

The story was included in Nothing But Wodehouse, a collection of Wodehouse stories edited by Ogden Nash and published on 20 July 1932 by Doubleday, Doran & Company, New York. It was also included in the Mulliner Omnibus, published in 1935 in the UK by Herbert Jenkins, and in 1974 in the US by the Taplinger Publishing Company as The World of Mr. Mulliner. It was collected in The Most of P. G. Wodehouse, published in 1960 by Simon and Schuster, New York.

== Adaptations ==
"The Truth About George" was adapted as an episode of the BBC television series Wodehouse Playhouse. The episode was first broadcast on 23 April 1975.

It was adapted for radio in 2004 as part of a series starring Richard Griffiths as Mr Mulliner. It was dramatised by Roger Davenport and directed by Ned Chaillet. The cast included Matilda Ziegler as Miss Postlethwaite and Susan, Peter Damey as a Dry Sherry and George, Martin Hyder as a Light Ale and the runaway, and David Timson as a Pint of Stout, the specialist, and a guard.

== See also ==
- List of Wodehouse's Mr Mulliner stories
