= Meet Mr Mulliner =

1927 short story collection by P. G. Wodehouse

First edition (UK)

Meet Mr. Mulliner is a collection of short stories by the English writer and humorist P. G. Wodehouse. First published in the United Kingdom on 27 September 1927 by Herbert Jenkins, and in the United States on 2 March 1928 by Doubleday, Doran. The short stories were originally published in magazines, mainly The Strand Magazine in the UK and Liberty in the US.

The collection introduces the irrepressible pub raconteur Mr. Mulliner, who narrates all nine of the book's stories. The last story, "Honeysuckle Cottage", was not originally a Mr. Mulliner story; it was given a Mulliner frame for the book, and is the only one of the stories which is not explicitly narrated from the bar-parlour of the Angler's Rest public house.

== Contents ==
=== "The Truth about George" ===
- UK: Strand, July 1926
- US: Liberty, 3 July 1926

See "The Truth about George".

=== "A Slice of Life" ===
- UK: Strand, August 1926
- US: Liberty, 7 August 1926

See "A Slice of Life".

=== "Mulliner's Buck-U-Uppo" ===
- US: Liberty, 4 September 1926
- UK: Strand, November 1926

See "Mulliner's Buck-U-Uppo".

=== "The Bishop's Move" ===
- US: Liberty, 20 August 1927
- UK: Strand, September 1927

See "The Bishop's Move".

=== "Came the Dawn" ===
- US: Liberty, 11 June 1927
- UK: Strand, July 1927

Plot

A man at the Angler's Rest recounts how his dog won a prize after being mistakenly entered in a local cat show, and notes how mistakes can lead to unexpected good results. Mulliner is inspired to tell the following story, which he claims also shows that you can never tell what will happen in the end and that it is always darkest before the dawn.

Mr Mulliner's nephew Lancelot Bassington Mulliner wants to be a poet, though Lancelot's maternal uncle Jeremiah Biggs, the proprietor of Briggs' Breakfast Pickles, wants him to work in the pickle business. Lancelot falls in love with Angela, the beautiful daughter of the Earl of Biddlecombe, who has little money. While they are dancing, Lancelot says he wants to marry her. Angela admires Lancelot's excellent dancing, but her father wants her to marry someone wealthy, so she is thinking of marrying Slingsby Purvis, of Purvis's Liquid Dinner Glue. Hooping to get a job from his uncle, Lancelot writes a poem praising Briggs's pickles for advertising. Lancelot goes to his uncle's Putney house and reads his poem to his uncle. The poem, titled "Darkling (A Threnody)", is extremely somber, and Briggs has his butler throw Lancelot out.

Lancelot goes to Lord Biddlecombe's residence in Berkeley Square, and asks for Biddlecombe's consent to marry her daughter. Biddlecombe sells some things to Lancelot to make some money, then has his butler throw Lancelot out. A stout man with horn-rimmed spectacles tries to talk to Lancelot, but Lancelot ignores him. Having been unsuccessful with Biggs and Biddlecombe, Lancelot heads to Angela's club, the Junior Lipstick Club (also mentioned in "The Reverent Wooing of Archibald"), in order to plead with Angela to marry him even though he is not rich. She is unwilling to marry a poor poet and says she will marry Purvis. She tells the club's hall-porter to throw Lancelot out. Lancelot is dejected, but the stout man with horn-rimmed spectacles from before appears again and knows all about Lancelot's situation because he has read everything in Lancelot's expressive face. The man, Isadore Zinzinheimer, represents a motion picture company in Hollywood and wants to hire Lancelot as an actor since he registers emotion so well. Lancelot no longer loves Angela and happily agrees to go to Hollywood.

=== "The Story of William" ===
- US: Liberty, 9 April 1927 (as "It Was Only a Fire")
- UK: Strand, May 1927

Plot

An American gentleman visits the Angler's Rest. He speaks highly of California, where he is from. Mr Mulliner remarks that California is fine except for the earthquakes. The American asserts that California is perfect and free of earthquakes. Mr Mulliner argues the contrary, and says that his uncle, William Mulliner, experienced the 1906 San Francisco earthquake. He tells the following story about his uncle's experience, despite the American insisting that what happened in 1906 was only a fire.

William Mulliner loves Myrtle Banks, but she is impressed with the bravery of William's rival, Desmond Franklyn, who claims to have killed sharks and lions. She and Franklyn get engaged. William tries to argue that Franklyn is cruel to animals, but Myrtle is not swayed. William is disappointed, and a hall-porter at the hotel he is staying at suggests he get a drink at a local establishment called Mike's Place. William, until now a teetotaler, follows the hall-porter's advice. He ends up drinking too much and gets thrown out after starting a fight. He falls asleep outside a boarding house for theatrical performers. When he wakes up, he looks inside and sees some unusually small men eating a meal. William, unaware that these men belong to a performing group called Murphy's Midgets, believes he is hallucinating due to the alcohol.

Back at his hotel, William goes to bed. He sees a part of the ceiling fall and hears shouts and crashes, but assumes he is still hallucinating. He falls asleep, and when he wakes up, he sees that the room has in fact largely fallen apart. Myrtle, who was staying at the same hotel, notices William from the exposed hallway and is surprised that he is still in bed. He tells her he noticed the walls falling at night and went to sleep anyway. She calls him the bravest man in the world. She already ended her engagement to Franklyn, who hastily fled when the earthquake started without stopping to help Myrtle. William and Myrtle get married, and name their first son John San Francisco Earthquake Mulliner.

=== "Portrait of a Disciplinarian" ===
- US: Liberty, 24 September 1927
- UK: Strand, October 1927

Plot

Mr Mulliner, just returned from visiting his old nanny, remarks that a nanny will always view a boy she looked after as a boy even after he becomes an adult. He tells the following story about his nephew, Frederick Mulliner.

Frederick Mulliner's brother, Dr George Mulliner, wants Frederick to visit their old nanny, 85-year-old Nurse Wilks. Frederick is reluctant, remembering how she once shut him up in a cupboard for stealing jam. George remarks that she is still inclined to be autocratic. However, her heart is weak. For the sake of her health, Frederick must agree to do whatever she wants him to, including eat boiled eggs, though Frederick tries to protest. She has already been visited by George and the Oliphants, who were also looked after by Nurse Wilks as children. Frederick was recently engaged to Jane Oliphant but she ended the engagement without explanation and got engaged to a man named Dillingwater. Frederick arrives at Nurse Wilks's house in Bingley-on-Sea. She initially seems frail, but soon orders Frederick to take off his boots and makes him feel like a small child.

To Frederick's surprise, Jane Oliphant is at the house. Frederick and Jane argue with each other. Nurse Wilks tells Frederick to apologize to Jane and give her a kiss. He apologizes though he refuses to kiss her. Nurse Wilks orders him to go into the cupboard and stay there until he is good. Frederick hesitates, but he remembers George's warning about Nurse Wilks's heart, so he obeys and goes into the cupboard. Shortly afterward, Jane is sent into the same cupboard for smoking a cigarette. After they argue more, Jane reveals that she ended their engagement because she knew Frederick lied to her about having lunch with another woman. Frederick explains that he was buying the woman's Pekingese dog, which Jane had adored, as a surprise gift for Jane. He still has the dog, which is now in his flat. Jane is delighted. She already broke up with Dillingwater, since she did not love him and only got engaged to him to score off Frederick. They happily embrace. From outside the cupboard, Nurse Wilks asks if Frederick will be good now and kiss Jane. Frederick replies that he will do so, and also bravely faces Nurse Wilks's boiled eggs.

=== "The Romance of a Bulb-Squeezer" ===
- UK: Strand, March 1927
- US: Liberty, 12 March 1927

Plot

Mr Mulliner is inspired by a photograph in an illustrated weekly paper to tell the following tale about his cousin Clarence.

The mayor of Tooting East, Jno. Horatio Biggs, O.B.E., wants aspiring photographer Clarence Mulliner to take his photograph. However, the mayor is ugly and Clarence refuses to take his picture. Clarence makes Biggs leave his studio by prodding him with a tripod, for which Biggs sues him. Clarence's lawyer successfully defends him in court and the jury decides in Clarence's favour. The publicity of the trial makes Clarence a famous and fashionable photographer. Mr Mulliner hears of Clarence's success and visits his studio, but finds Clarence listless and moody. Many beautiful women have had him take their picture and he is now tired of seeing beautiful women. In a traffic jam at the top of Whitehall, Clarence sees a girl in another cab. She does not have a conventionally attractive face. Clarence falls in love with her on sight, but soon the traffic jam clears and she disappears. Clarence is upset about losing her, which makes him seem like a more solemn, profound photographer and enhances his prestige further. The doors of Society open to anyone photographed by him. However, Clarence does not care about his fame and only wants to see the girl in the cab again.

One night, he is visited by a man with a black mask who claims to be a British agent and asks Clarence to come with him to take a photograph of an important visiting dignitary. Clarence follows him but is kidnapped and tied up. The man in the mask was actually the secretary of Biggs, the Mayor of Tooting East, who had Clarence kidnapped. He has given up on having his own photograph taken by Clarence, but insists that Clarence take his daughter's photograph. Clarence breaks free and is also helped by Biggs's daughter, Gladys, who disapproves of her father kidnapping Clarence. Clarence is stunned to see that she is the girl from the cab. She had also seen Clarence in his cab and loves him. Clarence declares that he will take a photograph of her and her father, which makes the mayor sob with joy. Clarence happily retires from commercial photography. Clarence and Gladys's wedding is attended by many important people and they walk out of church under an arch of crossed tripods.

=== "Honeysuckle Cottage" ===
- US: Saturday Evening Post, 24 January 1925
- UK: Strand, February 1925

See "Honeysuckle Cottage".

== Publication history ==
All the stories, except "Honeysuckle Cottage", were illustrated by Charles Crombie in the Strand, and by Wallace Morgan in Liberty.

Wodehouse dedicated the book "To the Earl of Oxford and Asquith" (H. H. Asquith).

"The Truth about George", "A Slice of Life", and "Mulliner's Buck-U-Uppo" were included in the 1932 collection Nothing But Wodehouse, edited by Ogden Nash and published in New York by Doubleday, Doran & Company. The same three stories were also included in The Most of P. G. Wodehouse, published in October 1960 by Simon and Schuster, New York.

All of the stories were included in the Mulliner Omnibus, published in October 1935 by Herbert Jenkins Limited. They were also included in The World of Mr. Mulliner, published by Barrie & Jenkins in June 1972 and issued in the US in 1974 by the Taplinger Publishing Company.

"The Romance of a Bulb-Squeezer" was included in the 1981 collection Wodehouse On Crime, edited by D. R. Bensen and published by Ticknor & Fields, New York. It was printed in the Northwest Airlines magazine Northwest in February 1988.

== Adaptations ==
"The Truth About George", "Mulliner's Buck-U-Uppo", and "Portrait of a Disciplinarian" were adapted for television in the series Wodehouse Playhouse (1974–78).

Multiple Mulliner stories were adapted for radio from 2002 and 2004 with Richard Griffiths as Mr Mulliner, including "The Truth About George", "Mulliner's Buck-U-Uppo", "A Slice of Life", "The Bishop's Move", "Came the Dawn", and "Honeysuckle Cottage".

== See also ==
- Mr. Mulliner Speaking (1929) and Mulliner Nights (1933) – Two other collections of Mulliner stories
- Complete list of Wodehouse's Mr. Mulliner stories

== References and sources ==
Sources

- McIlvaine, Eileen; Sherby, Louise S.; Heineman, James H. (1990). P. G. Wodehouse: A Comprehensive Bibliography and Checklist. New York: James H. Heineman Inc. ISBN 978-0-87008-125-5.
- "Meet Mr. Mulliner". The Russian Wodehouse Society.
