= Mr Mulliner Speaking =

1929 short story collection by P. G. Wodehouse

First edition (UK)

Mr. Mulliner Speaking is a collection of nine short stories by P. G. Wodehouse. It was first published in the United Kingdom on April 30, 1929, by Herbert Jenkins, and in the United States on February 21, 1930, by Doubleday, Doran. The stories were originally published in magazines in the UK and the US between 1924 and 1929.

All stories are narrated by the inexorable raconteur Mr. Mulliner, a fisherman who tells stories at the Angler's Rest about members of his prodigious family, including one who is also a member of the Drones Club. The last three of the stories are about Bobbie Wickham; they were revised and given a Mr. Mulliner frame for the book.

== Contents ==
=== "The Reverent Wooing of Archibald" ===
- UK: Strand, August 1928
- US: Cosmopolitan, September 1928

The story features Mr Mulliner's nephew Archibald Mulliner, the sock collector who can mimic a hen laying an egg, and his love Aurelia Cammarleigh. They also appear in "Archibald and the Masses" and "The Code of the Mulliners", both collected in Young Men in Spats (1936).

Plot

At the Angler's Rest, the subject of the "Modern Girl" comes up, and four drinkers believe that girls are smaller than before. They agree that it is impossible to understand why. Mr Mulliner interrupts to disagree with his companions, claiming that the disappearance of the "dignified, queenly type of girl" occurred because young men do not have the nerve to propose to them and their disappearance was Nature's method of ensuring the continuation of humanity. He had become convinced that this was the case upon observing the behavior of his nephew Archibald when he was in love with Aurelia Cammarleigh.

Archibald first saw Miss Cammarleigh from out the window of the Drones Club and, though he immediately fell in love, he was careful to mask his feelings when enquiring of a fellow Drone, Algy Wymondham-Wymondham, whether he knew her. Algy does, and informs Archibald of her name as well as her family circumstances: she lives in Park Street with a "potty" aunt, who believes that Francis Bacon wrote the plays attributed to William Shakespeare.

Archibald departs to buy socks and contemplate whether Aurelia would be attracted to him. He thinks she seems very dignified and sophisticated, and concludes that his primary talent, a masterful impression of a hen laying an egg, is insufficient; indeed, he becomes convinced that she would be put off by such a vulgar display. Consequently, when he first meets her at Ascot several weeks thereafter, he denies vehemently the ability to do the impression when she mentions that she heard that he could do the imitation. He reads about Shakespeare and Bacon for two weeks in order to impress Aurelia's aunt with his knowledge of them. This results in the aunt inviting Archibald to her country house.

He goes to the house, tries to impress Aurelia and her aunt by not smoking or drinking, and endures abstruse conversation with Aurelia's aunt, but is too nervous to speak to Aurelia. At night, Archibald eavesdrops on Aurelia and her friend Muriel. Aurelia tells her friend that she is disappointed that what Algy told her about Archibald's ability to imitate a hen laying an egg is not true, and thinks Archibald is too uptight. He also hears that Aurelia plans to play a prank on him by sending her bulldog into his room through the window. When Archibald hears her outside his window, he starts to give his imitation of a hen laying an egg. Aurelia is awestruck by his performance. She now sees that he is not uptight like she thought and they embrace. Archibald admits that he does smoke and drink, and that he actually dislikes Aurelia's aunt, which pleases Aurelia.

=== "The Man Who Gave Up Smoking" ===
- UK: Strand, March 1929
- US: Liberty, 23 March 1929

Plot

An argument in the Angler's Rest about giving up smoking leads to Mr Mulliner telling the following story about his nephew Ignatius Mulliner, a portrait-painter.

Ignatius loves Hermione Rossiter and has proposed to her multiple times, but she has always turned him down. Hoping to find out why she has rejected him, Ignatius asks her brother Cyprian. Cyprian, a haughty art critic, claims that Hermione told him she did not like Ignatius because he was too similar to her other brother George, who does no work and lives on borrowed money. George, on the other hand, says that Hermione told him that Ignatius was too much like Cyprian. The only thing the brothers have in common is that they are heavy smokers, like Ignatius, so he believes that Hermione dislikes his smoking. He decides to give up smoking to win her over.

Ignatius initially tries to cope with the loss of smoking by devoting himself to selfless acts. He invites Cypress to come to his flat to freely criticise his painting, and also invites George in order to give him a loan. Furthermore, he tells Hermione's mother, Mrs Rossiter, that he will paint Hermione's portrait for free. However, Ignatius is very irritable the next day. He threatens Cyprian with an ornamental dagger, kicks George, and insults Hermione's appearance. Afterward, Ignatius smokes his pipe. He becomes amiable again and regrets his words to Hermione. However, she is glad that he insulted her appearance, because she thought he had proposed to her for her looks alone and not for her intelligence, and she wants to be loved for her intelligence. They share an embrace. She explains that she compared Ignatius to her brothers because he plays the ukulele like George and wears sloppy clothes like Cyprian. Ignatius happily gives his ukulele away and goes with Hermione to a new tailor.

=== "The Story of Cedric" ===
- UK: Strand, May 1929
- US: Liberty, 11 May 1929

Plot

Miss Postlethwaite, the popular barmaid at the Angler's Rest, has severed her engagement to Alfred Lukyn because he wanted to wear yellow shoes to church despite her objection. Mr Mullier remarks that, while a pair of yellow shoes parted Miss Postlethwaite from her fiancé, a similar pair of shoes brought Mulliner's cousin Cedric a bride.

Fastidious 45-year-old bachelor Cedric Mulliner lives at the Albany, and has an efficient secretary, Myrtle Watling. At a luncheon in Grosvenor Square, he sees a friend, Lady Chloe Downblotton. After the luncheon, they run into Lady Chloe's fiancé Claude. Lady Chloe is alarmed that Claude is wearing yellow shoes with otherwise correct morning-clothes. She asks Cedric Mulliner to trade shoes with Claude. Cedric is very fashion-conscious and reluctant to do so, but he agrees because Lady Chloe is the well-connected daughter of an earl and Cedric admires the aristocracy. After trading shoes, he immediately gets a cab to return to the Albany. However, he is unwilling to walk into the prestigious building with the wrong kind of shoes. He tells the cab-driver, Mr Lanchester, to go to the suburb Valley Fields, where Cedric's secretary lives, to get her help.

At the house, Cedric tells the cab-driver to wait, but decides he cannot face Miss Watling in morning-clothes and yellow shoes. He hears someone snoring, and looks through a window to see a man fast asleep in an armchair with black boots beside him. Cedric quietly sneaks through the window and tries to grab the boots. The man wakes up and Cedric only manages to exchange one of his yellow shoes for a black one, and drops his top hat too. Discouraged by the loss of his hat, Cedric gives up and decides to exit the house out the back, but he gets stuck in the sash window, with his head outside the house. Cedric blames Lady Chloe for his situation and now hates the aristocracy. Outside, Miss Watling sees Cedric, and he tells her his story. She states that Cedric needs someone to look after him. She does not mind taking on the job and will marry him. The man who had slept in the chair appears along with Mr Lanchester, and Myrtle tells the former, who is her father, that Cedric is her fiancé. Cedric had never thought of marrying, but he agrees anyway, since Myrtle would at least help keep him from predicaments like this and is not part of the aristocracy.

=== "The Ordeal of Osbert Mulliner" ===
- US: Liberty, 24 November 1928
- UK: Strand, December 1928

Plot

Mr Mulliner claims that a man who has to overcome obstacles to get married will be less likely to get a divorce, because he will not take his wife for granted. He attributes the happiness of his nephew Osbert's marriage to the difficulties Osbert faced to get married. Mulliner tells the following story.

Osbert Mulliner is courting Mabel Petherick-Soames and she seems to return his feelings. One evening, just after Osbert kisses her, Mabel's cousin, intimidating explorer J. Bashford Braddock, appears. He also loves Mabel and privately threatens Osbert to stop spending time with Mabel. Afraid of Braddock, Osbert writes a letter of farewell to Mabel saying that he has been called away to Australia. The next day, Osbert is visited by Major-General Sir Masterman Petherick-Soames, Mabel's uncle. He will not allow Osbert to trifle with his niece's affections and tells him their engagement will shortly be announced.

Osbert's valet Parker informs him that Braddock has heard about announcement and will shortly visit Osbert. To avoid Braddock's wrath, Osbert tells Parker that he will leave for India and no longer needs domestic staff. Osbert also disguises himself with a wig and false whiskers. He goes to the second-hand clothing establishment of the Bros Cohen for new clothes. Unfortunately for Osbert, both Braddock and the Major-General are there. Having spent years in India, the Major-General offers to see the disguised Osbert off to his ship. Osbert fears he will be recognized out in the sunlight, so he gives up on his plan to sail. Osbert decides to run away to a suburb, but first he returns to his now unstaffed house at South Audley Street. He hides behind some curtains when he realizes two burglars are there. The burglars, Harold and Ernest, drink Osbert's wine and get into an argument with each other about good manners. They knock each other out. Osbert calls the police. Braddock comes, intending to intimidate Osbert again, but is daunted when Osbert claims he overpowered the burglars. Braddock instead asks if Osbert would like a fish-slice for a wedding present.

=== "Unpleasantness at Bludleigh Court" ===
- UK: Strand, February 1929
- US: Liberty, 2 February 1929

Plot

A poet staying at the Angler's Rest is made uneasy after a hunter with dead rabbits stops by. Mulliner is reminded of his niece, Charlotte Mulliner.

Charlotte has an ample private income and writes "Vignettes in Verse" for artistic weekly magazines for no charge, merely because she likes to see her works published. At a literary luncheon, she meets Aubrey Bollinger, who writes "Pastels in Prose" under the name Aubrey Trefusis. Aubrey is compassionate towards animals and does not fit in with the rest of his family, who are enthusiastic about hunting. Charlotte sympathizes with Aubrey. His parents and two brothers live at Bludleigh Court in Bedfordshire, where Charlotte is supposed to visit soon since her mother was a friend of Lady Bassinger. Aubrey warns her that Bludleigh Court exercises a spell and somehow causes its inhabitants to want to hunt. Charlotte is confident she will not be affected. Regardless, Aubrey accompanies her to the house to help defend her from the influence of the house. Charlotte and Aubrey appear to have feelings for each other.

Aubrey's gnu-hunting uncle, Colonel Francis Pashley-Drake, annoys Charlotte by talking to her about hunting and insulting Aubrey. Aubrey is about to propose to Charlotte when he suddenly tries to chase a rat with Charlotte's parasol. He then seems to wake from a trance and finishes proposing to Charlotte, but she refuses because he chased the rat. He tells her that the spell of the house overcame him, but she does not believe him. While staying in the house, Charlotte writes a poem for the Animal-Lovers' Gazette, but the editor rejects her poem "Good Gnus", which is about hunting gnus. Charlotte wonders why they rejected it, since she now thinks hunting is a good pastime. Followed by Aubrey, who is also eager to hunt, she takes a shot at Colonel Pashley-Drake with an air-gun while he is sunbathing and hits him in the leg. Pashley-Drake is unhappy about being at the other end of a hunt and flees into Lady Bassinger's garden party, surprising the guests. He hides behind a bishop. Charlotte and Aubrey come to their senses, and Charlotte believes the house affected both of them. They agree to leave the house immediately and get married.

=== "Those in Peril on the Tee" ===
- US: Liberty, 21 May 1927
- UK: Strand, June 1927

In addition to being a Mulliner story, "Those in Peril on the Tee" is also one of Wodehouse's golf stories. The story is told by the Oldest Member in the magazine versions. "Those in Peril on the Tee" was included in the 1973 Wodehouse collection The Golf Omnibus.

Plot

Mr Mulliner speaks to two young men in golfing attire and tells them he used to play golf before taking up the pastime of fishing. Despite their efforts to get out of listening to the story, Mr Mulliner tells them about the only Mulliner to have attained any real proficiency at golf, Agnes Flack, the daughter of a distant cousin of his.

Two quiet, timid men, mystery writer John Gooch and cartoonist Frederick Pilcher, often call at Agnes Flack's house. The two men each have a handicap of eighteen. The hearty and athletic Agnes is more skilled and a scratch player (meaning she has a handicap of zero). Sidney McMurdo, a muscular golfer who was once a semi-finalist in the Amateur Championship, loves Agnes, but she merely laughs at him every time he proposes to her. After he proposes to her for the eleventh time, she tells McMurdo she wants to marry someone intellectual. She thinks both Gooch and Pilcher love her. Having been inspired by magazine stories about men playing a match of golf to decide who was to win the heroine, she plans a match of golf between Gooch and Pilcher to determine which one she will marry. Gooch and Pilcher do not actually love Agnes, and only called at her house to draw inspiration from her for their stories and cartoons respectively, but neither are willing to admit this to the intimidating McMurdo.

Both Gooch and Pilcher hope to lose and plan to play badly in their match, but not obviously enough to be suspected by McMurdo, who will be the referee. Pilcher shows up wearing a glossy top hat and morning-coat, claiming he has to go into the city immediately after the match, and actually hoping the constrictive clothes will make him play worse. Gooch tries to influence Pilcher subconsciously by repeatedly telling him he will play well. However, their efforts backfire. Gooch only influenced his own subconscious and plays well, while the constrictive clothes help correct Pilcher's tendency to over-swing. Both men play better than usual, and begin to think that marrying Agnes is worth playing such a good game, when Agnes arrives and referees the rest of the match. Not wanting to marry her, Gooch and Pilcher manage to play badly. Pilcher picks up his ball, pretending to brush mud off it, and is disqualified. Gooch is irritated, and regrets he did not think of doing this himself. Fortunately for Gooch, Agnes is unwilling to marry anyone who plays golf as badly as he did and will marry McMurdo.

=== "Something Squishy" ===
- US: Saturday Evening Post, 20 December 1924
- UK: Strand, January 1925

Plot

Mr Mulliner returns from visiting his cousin Lady Wickham at her home of Skeldings Hall in Hertfordshire. Lady Wickham is somewhat worried about her daughter, Roberta "Bobbie" Wickham, since she does not get married. Roberta is mischievous and gets her suitors into trouble. Sipping his usual hot Scotch and lemon, Mulliner tells the story of one of Roberta's suitors, Roland Moresby Attwater.

Roland, an essayist and literary critic, attends his uncle's dinner with a mud-stained shirt, and is eager to recount how his shirt became muddy, but everyone is too polite to ask about it. His uncle, city magistrate Sir Joseph Moresby, thinks the quiet and sensible Roland should marry Lucy Moresby, who is also quiet and sensible. His uncle finally mentions the mud, and Roland tells him he got dirty by pulling a man out of the way of a car in Duke Street and saved his life. Roland does not want to marry Lucy because he loves Bobbie Wickham, whom Sir Joseph fined at court for speeding. Roland gave a positive review of one of Lady Wickham's books, though he dislikes it, and is rewarded with an invitation to the Wickham home, Skeldings Hall. At his flat, Roland discovers that the man he saved, who owns a bird-and-snake shop, sent him a box with something squishy inside as a gift. To Roland's surprise, it is a snake. Bobbie thinks Roland should use the snake for mischief, but Roland disagrees and wants the snake returned.

At Skeldings, Roland has a rival for Bobbie's affections, the handsome and dignified Sir Claude Lynn. Bobbie tells Roland that she put the snake, which she named Sidney and had Roland's valet pack in his luggage, in Sir Claude's bed for the fun of it. Roland fears that the snake will be traced back to him, so he goes to Sir Claude's room to retrieve it. While he is in the room, he hears Sir Claude enter, and hides in a large cupboard. However, Sir Claude finds him. Thinking him drunk, he removes Roland from the room. Sir Claude then finds the snake, and alerts the household. Lady Wickham's butler, Simmons, is able to confirm that the snake belongs to Roland since the footman Thomas moved Roland's luggage, including the box with the snake. Roland hides in his room from Sir Claude and Lady Wickham. Simmons knocks on Roland's door, and returns the snake to him on a salver. Bobbie suggests that Roland sneak out and take an early train to London. The next day, Roland tells his new fiancée Lucy about how he saved a man's life in Duke Street.

=== "The Awful Gladness of the Mater" ===
- US: Saturday Evening Post, 21 March 1925
- UK: Strand, May 1925

Plot

Mr Mulliner continues telling the patrons of the Angler's Rest about the unfortunate suitors of his cousin's daughter, Bobbie Wickham. The following story concerns Dudley Finch, a cousin of Roland Attwater.

Dudley's godfather, Mr Sampson Broadhurst, has offered to take him to Australia to teach him sheep-farming. However, Dudley does not want to leave because he loves Bobbie Wickham, despite the disapproval of his cousin Roland. Bobbie says that Dudley can come to Skeldings. She will send her mother a wire, and states that Lady Wickham will be awfully glad to see Dudley. When Dudley first arrives at Skeldings, Lady Wickham mistakenly thinks he is an interviewer from Milady's Boudoir. He clarifies that he is a friend of Bobbie, who evidently forgot to send her mother a wire. Lady Wickham is not pleased that Dudley is there. To make things worse, he is unable to wear proper dinner clothes since he accidentally switched his suitcase with someone at the Drones Club who was going to a fancy dress party with a boyish sailor suit costume.

Feeling discouraged, Dudley plans to leave and asks about the train schedule. Simmons informs Lady Wickham that Dudley apparently brought a disguise and inquired about the early morning train, and therefore is probably a burglar. Furthermore, Bobbie has not yet arrived, so Simmons thinks Dudley may be lying about being her friend. Simmons keeps watch with a gun and alerts Lady Wickham when Dudley goes to the dining room, not knowing he is merely looking for food. Dudley pretends he wanted a book to read. While talking about books, he insults the works of George Masterman, not knowing this is the pen name used by Lady Wickham. Embarrassed, Dudley returns to his room, and Simmons continues to keep watch. Finally, Bobbie appears. She got into an accident and is in trouble for ruining her car. She told her mother she did not know Dudley to avoid getting in more trouble. Following her directions, Dudley bribes Simmons with five pounds and sneaks out through the window. Dudley is far from the house when he gets shot in the fleshy part of his leg. The next day, Bobbie apologizes for this. She explains Simmons wasn't trying to hit him and just wanted Lady Wickham to hear a shot. Dudley retorts that he hopes Lady Wickham was pleased and that he is going to Australia.

=== "The Passing of Ambrose" ===
- UK: Strand, July 1928
- US: Cosmopolitan, August 1928

Plot

Mr Mulliner remarks that few things are more painful than an argument between boyhood friends, and that such a situation occurred between Algy Crufts and Ambrose Wiffin.

Algy and Ambrose planned a trip to Monte Carlo together. Although they have bought their tickets, Ambrose wants to put off their trip for a fortnight so he can court Bobbie Wickham. Algy, an old friend of Bobbie's, knows all too well that other fellows who come in contact with Bobbie end up in trouble and warns Ambrose, but Ambrose does not believe him. Algy refuses to wait and will go to Monte Carlo alone if Ambrose will not leave with him in two days. Bobbie Wickham wants to help her friend Jane Falconer choose cushions for her new flat, but her mother insists that she take her young cousin Wilfred and his friend, Esmond Bates (called "Old Stinker" by Wilfred), to the movies. Bobbie invites Ambrose to join them. The boys are annoying but Ambrose agrees so that he can spend time with Bobbie. They go to the Tivoli to see a lively film entitled Where Passion Lurks, based (obviously very loosely) on the poem "We are Seven". Bobbie leaves before the film starts, claiming to have just remembered an appointment, leaving Ambrose to look after the two boys.

Before the film, Ambrose dropped his hat and it got stepped on, and the boys mock Ambrose for this repeatedly before and after the movie. Irritated, he smacks Wilfred on the head. A passing elderly lady rebukes Ambrose, embarrassing him. Then the boys want to eat oysters, and after the expenses of transportation and the movie, Ambrose regretfully does not have enough money to tip the waiter at the end of the meal. Next, they take an omnibus. While on the bus, Ambrose realizes that Bobbie lied about having an appointment and never intended to see the movie with him. Chaos ensues when a man is frightened by Esmond's white mouse. At this point, Ambrose has had enough and leaves the bus. The next day, he receives a letter from Bobbie, which expresses her disappointment in him for leaving the boys in London. A policeman brought Wilfred home, and it is implied that Lady Wickham is angry with Bobbie for shirking her duty. Ambrose picks up the telephone and tells Algy that he will meet him the next day for their trip to Monte Carlo.

== Publication history ==
In the Strand (UK), six of the stories were illustrated by Charles Crombie. The other three stories, "Something Squishy", "The Awful Gladness of the Mater", and "The Passing of Ambrose", were illustrated by Treyer Evans.

In Liberty (US), Wallace Morgan illustrated "The Ordeal of Osbert Mulliner", "Unpleasantness at Bludleigh Court", "The Man Who Gave Up Smoking", "The Story of Cedric", and "Those in Peril on the Tee". May Wilson Preston illustrated "Something Squishy" and "Awful Gladness of the Mater" in the Saturday Evening Post. "The Reverent Wooing of Archibald" and "The Passing of Ambrose" were illustrated by James Montgomery Flagg in Cosmopolitan (US).

The dust jacket of the US first edition was illustrated by Wallace Morgan.

"The Man Who Gave Up Smoking", "The Story of Cedric", and "Those in Peril on the Tee" were published in the Family Herald and Weekly Star (Montreal, Canada) on 17 April, 24 April, and 1 May 1935 respectively, all illustrated by James H. Hammon. "Unpleasantness at Bludleigh Court" was published in the October 1952 issue of The Magazine of Fantasy & Science Fiction.

"The Reverent Wooing of Archibald", "The Ordeal of Osbert Mulliner", "Unpleasantness at Bludleigh Court", and "Something Squishy" were featured in the 1932 collection Nothing But Wodehouse, edited by Ogden Nash and published in New York by Doubleday, Doran & Company. "The Reverent Wooing of Archibald" and "The Ordeal of Osbert Mulliner" were included in The Most of P. G. Wodehouse, published on 15 October 1960 by Simon and Schuster, New York. "Unpleasantness at Bludleigh Court" and "Something Squishy" were collected in A Wodehouse Bestiary, edited by D. R. Bensen and published on 15 October 1985 by Ticknor & Fields, New York.

All of the stories were included in the Mulliner Omnibus, published in October 1935 by Herbert Jenkins Limited, and in The World of Mr. Mulliner, published by Barrie & Jenkins in June 1972. "Unpleasantness at Bludleigh Court" was featured in the 1934 anthology Short Stories of Today, edited by Raymond Woodbury Pence.

== Adaptations ==
"The Reverent Wooing of Archibald" was adapted for television in the anthology series Comedy Playhouse in 1974. It was the pilot episode of the series Wodehouse Playhouse (1975–78). "Unpleasantness at Bludleigh Court" was adapted as an episode of Wodehouse Playhouse in 1975.

Richard Griffiths starred as Mr Mulliner in a series of radio dramatisations of Mulliner stories from 2002 to 2004, including an adaptation of "The Ordeal of Osbert Mulliner" in 2004.

== See also ==
- Meet Mr Mulliner (1927) and Mulliner Nights (1933) – Two other collections of Mulliner stories
- List of short stories by P. G. Wodehouse, categorised by series

== References and sources ==
Sources

- McIlvaine, Eileen; Sherby, Louise S.; Heineman, James H. (1990). P. G. Wodehouse: A Comprehensive Bibliography and Checklist. New York: James H. Heineman Inc. ISBN 978-0-87008-125-5.
- Midkiff, Neil. "The Wodehouse short stories". P. G. Wodehouse pages.
- Wodehouse, P. G. (1929). Mr Mulliner Speaking. New York: The Overlook Press. pp. 8–231. ISBN 1-58567-659-4.
