= Mulliner's Buck-U-Uppo =

1926 short story by P. G. Wodehouse

- Short story by P. G. Wodehouse
- Country: United Kingdom
- Language: English
- Genre: Comedy

Publication
- Publisher: Liberty (US); Strand (UK)
- Media type: Print (Magazine)
- Publication date: 4 September 1926 (US); November 1926 (UK)

"Mulliner's Buck-U-Uppo" is a short story by the British comic writer P. G. Wodehouse. A part of the Mr. Mulliner series, the story was first published in the United States by Liberty Magazine on 4 September 1926 and in the United Kingdom in The Strand in November 1926. It was collected in Meet Mr. Mulliner (1927).

== Plot ==
Augustine Mulliner, a meek and mild young curate, arrives in Lower-Briskett-in-the-Midden to assist the vicar, the Rev. Stanley Brandon and falls in love with the vicar's daughter, Jane Brandon. The young lovers wonder how to approach the fierce vicar about their love when a package arrives from Augustine Mulliner's aunt containing a tonic, Buck-U-Uppo (it works directly on the corpuscles). Mulliner takes a tablespoonful as recommended by his aunt and becomes more confident and assertive. The next morning, after another tablespoonful, he rescues a visiting bishop chased up a tree by a dog and firmly ends a quarrel between the bishop and the vicar, receives the vicar's blessings for his love for Jane, saves the bishop from being forced to wear thick winter woolies, and becomes the bishop's secretary. On returning to his rooms, he finds a letter from his cousin Wilfred Mulliner ("A Slice of Life") explaining that the tonic, mistakenly sent to Augustine, is meant for steeling the nerves of elephants in India ("too often elephants, on sighting the tiger, have turned and galloped home," he writes). Augustine promptly writes for three cases of Buck-U-Uppo.

=== Buck-U-Uppo ===
The creation of Wilfred Mulliner, one of Mr. Mulliner's brothers, Buck-U-Uppo is a tonic invented 'primarily with the object of providing Indian Rajahs with a specific which would encourage their elephants to face a tiger of the jungle with a jaunty sang-froid'. The dose for an adult elephant is a teaspoonful mixed with the elephant's morning mash, though the various characters in the Mulliner stories are generally unaware of this and take glassfuls. Buck-U-Uppo features in three Mulliner stories: "Mulliner's Buck-U-Uppo", "The Bishop's Move", and "Gala Night".

== Publication history ==
Wallace Morgan illustrated the story in Liberty. The story was published in the Strand with illustrations by Charles Crombie. It was published in The Magazine of Fantasy & Science Fiction (US) in December 1955.

The story was included in the 1932 collection Nothing But Wodehouse, edited by Ogden Nash and published by Doubleday, Doran & Company, New York. It was collected in the Mulliner Omnibus, published in 1935 by Herbert Jenkins Limited, and in The World of Mr. Mulliner, published in 1972 by Barrie & Jenkins, London. The World of Mr. Mulliner was first issued in the US by the Taplinger Publishing Company in 1974. "Mulliner's Buck-U-Uppo" was included in The Most of P. G. Wodehouse, published in 1960 by Simon and Schuster, New York. It was also included in the 1984 collection The World of Wodehouse Clergy, published by Hutchinson, London.

The anthology A Pageant of Prose, edited by Frank H. McCloskey and published in 1935 by Harper, New York, included the story.

== Adaptations ==
A BBC television adaptation of the story in the series Wodehouse Playhouse first aired in December 1978.

A radio adaptation aired on 3 June 2002 on BBC Radio 4, as part of a series with Richard Griffiths as Mr Mulliner. In the episode "Mulliner's Buck-U-Uppo", the cast also included Matilda Ziegler as Miss Postlethwaite, Jane, and Aunt Angela, Peter Acre as a Port and the Rev. Stanley Brandon, David Timson as a Pint of Stout and the bishop, and Carl Prekopp as a Small Bitter and Augustine.

== See also ==
- List of Wodehouse's Mr Mulliner stories
