= The Bishop's Move =

1926 short story by P. G. Wodehouse

- Short story by P. G. Wodehouse
- Country: United Kingdom
- Language: English
- Genre: Comedy

Publication
- Publisher: Liberty (US); Strand (UK)
- Media type: Print (Magazine)
- Publication date: 20 August 1927 (US); September 1927 (UK)

"The Bishop's Move" is a short story by the British comic writer P. G. Wodehouse. A part of the Mr. Mulliner series, the story was first published in August 1927 in Liberty in the United States, and in September 1927 in The Strand Magazine in the UK. It also appears in the collection Meet Mr. Mulliner.

== Plot ==
Mr Mulliner tells another story about his nephew Augustine, which takes place around six months after the events of "Mulliner's Buck-U-Uppo".

The Bishop of Stortford's wife has instructed him to give the vicarage of Steeple Mummery, Hampshire, to her incompetent cousin, though the bishop would rather give it to his secretary, the cheerful Augustine Mulliner. The bishop receives a letter from his old friend, the Rev. Trevor Entwhistle ("Catsmeat"), who is now Headmaster of Harchester, their old school. The headmaster wants the bishop to visit the school to unveil a new statue of Lord Hemel of Hempstead ("Fatty"), another old schoolfellow. The bishop dislikes Hemel but is willing to unveil the statue anyway. He goes to Harchester with Augustine, who knows the school since his brother is there.

The statue is unveiled. After the ceremony, the headmaster and the bishop are exhausted. The bishop suggests they drink some of Augustine's tonic. The headmaster's butler is sent to request some of the tonic, called Buck-U-Uppo, from Augustine, and returns with a half-full bottle. The bishop does not know how much to take but does not want to disturb the butler again, so he guesses. The bishop and the headmaster each drink far more than a normal dose. They start to feel energetic and young. They talk about how much they dislike Fatty, and plan to paint the statue pink.

Around midnight, the bishop and the headmaster secretly paint the statue pink. Afterward, the headmaster realizes he lost the key to his building. The bishop remembers a water-pipe at the back he used for sneaking out in his youth, and the two start climbing up the pipe. A young man looks out a window. The headmaster and bishop tell him they are merely the cook's cats, and the young man allows them to enter. The headmaster and bishop agree that they probably deceived him, though the bishop sees that the young man was Augustine, who would not betray them anyway.

In the morning, Augustine asks the bishop if he took a big dose of the Buck-U-Uppo, and also mentions that the bishop's shovel-hat was found on the head of the statue. General Bloodenough, the Chairman of the College Board of Governors, confronts the bishop about his hat on the statue. A young boy appears and claims that he painted the statue. The general thinks the boy should be punished, but the headmaster and bishop insist that a harsh punishment is not necessary. The boy only has to write out twenty lines. He is Augustine's brother. Augustine paid him two pounds to take the blame. The bishop promises to repay Augustine and to make sure he gets the vicarage at Steeple Mummery.

== Publication history ==
Wallace Morgan illustrated the story in Liberty. It was illustrated by Charles Crombie in the Strand.

"The Bishop's Move" was collected in the Mulliner Omnibus, published in 1935 by Herbert Jenkins Limited, and in The World of Mr. Mulliner, published in 1972 by Barrie & Jenkins, London, and issued in the US by the Taplinger Publishing Company in 1974. It was included in the 1984 collection The World of Wodehouse Clergy, published by Hutchinson, London.

== Adaptations ==
The story was adapted for radio by Mollie Hardwick. The radio drama aired on the BBC Home Service on 1 September 1965 and was produced by Herbert Davies. The cast included Alan Haines, Fraser Kerr, and Nigel Anthony.

It was adapted as a radio drama that aired on 6 February 2004 on BBC Radio 4, as part of a radio series of Mulliner stories with Richard Griffiths as Mr Mulliner. The cast of "The Bishop's Move" included Tom George as a Small Bitter and Augustine Mulliner, David Timson as a Pint of Stout and the Bishop, Matilda Ziegler as Miss Postlethwaite and Mulliner Junior, Martin Hyder as a Light Ale and the headmaster, and Peter Acre as a Port and General Bloodenough.

== See also ==
- List of Wodehouse's Mr Mulliner stories
