= Mr. Mulliner =

Fictional character in P. G. Wodehouse stories

- First appearance: "The Truth about George" (1926)
- Last appearance: "George and Alfred" (1967)
- Created by: P. G. Wodehouse

In-universe information
- Gender: Male
- Nationality: British

Mr. Mulliner is a fictional character from the short stories of P. G. Wodehouse. Mr. Mulliner is a loquacious pub raconteur who, no matter what the topic of conversation, can find an appropriate (if improbable) story about a member of his family to match it.

Like much of Wodehouse's work, the Mr. Mulliner stories were originally written for magazine publication. Thirty-eight of the 43 overall Mulliner stories were originally published between 1926 and 1937. After one brief 1940 anecdote, the final four stories appeared much later, being published between 1958 and 1972.

== Overview ==
Like his fellow Wodehouse character, the Oldest Member, the raconteur Mr. Mulliner can turn any conversation into a "recollection", or funny story. Wodehouse revealed in an introduction that he devised Mr. Mulliner after collecting notebooks full of ideas that could not be used because they were too outlandish, until he had the happy notion of a fisherman whose veracity could be doubted.

In the first Mr. Mulliner story "The Truth About George", Wodehouse provides a description of Mr. Mulliner as "a short, stout, comfortable man of middle age" with eyes that are "large and round and earnest" and full of "extraordinarily childlike candor." A habitué of the Angler's Rest pub, where his fellow drinkers are identified only by their beverages, Mr. Mulliner is a "hot Scotch and lemon".

The tales of Mulliner all involve one of his relations: there are dozens upon dozens of cousins, nieces, and nephews. These include stories about loves lost, found and rekindled; fortunes made and lost; and opportunities grasped or missed. They take place across the globe: Los Angeles's Hollywood and the English country house are the settings for many.

Two Mulliner stories ("Gala Night" and "The Rise of Minna Nordstrom") are not primarily about one of Mr. Mulliner's relatives. However, in these two cases, Mr. Mulliner states that the stories were told to him by relatives; he is therefore reporting a story told to him by a relation, rather than a story about a relation.

== Stories ==
The Mulliner stories all employ an unusual structure. At the beginning of each story, an unnamed first-person narrator sets the scene at the Angler's Rest pub, describing the conversation at the bar-parlour. This will lead to Mr. Mulliner entering the conversation, generally elaborating on the conversational theme, and remarking that it reminds him of a story involving a relative. Then, no more than a page or two into the story, Mr. Mulliner effectively takes over the narration of the tale, describing the events that befell the relative in question. In the earlier stories, the unnamed first-person narrator returns very briefly to close out the tale back at the Angler's Rest—in later stories, the story ends when Mr. Mulliner has concluded it.

Mr. Mulliner himself is rarely a character in the tales he tells. An exception is the story "George and Alfred", in which Mr. Mulliner tries to help out one of his nephews who has been accused of a crime. In this story, we learn that Mr. Mulliner is a friend of Hollywood studio head Jacob Z. Schnellenhamer, and that he has stayed on Schnellenhamer's yacht while it was cruising the Mediterranean. We also learn that Mr. Mulliner's first name, whatever it may be, is not George.

Little else is revealed of Mulliner's character beyond his large family (although we never learn if Mr. Mulliner himself ever married or had children), his choice of beverage, and his hobby of fishing (which he mentions in one story replaced his earlier hobby of golf). Nevertheless, Mulliner narrates forty-three short stories. Many are collected in the three books, containing nine stories each, which bear his name:

- Meet Mr Mulliner (1927)
- Mr Mulliner Speaking (1929)
- Mulliner Nights (1933)

Fifteen other stories are scattered in other volumes:

- Five in Blandings Castle and Elsewhere (1935)
- Three in Young Men in Spats (1936)
- One in Lord Emsworth and Others (1937)
- One in Crime Wave at Blandings (1937)
- One in Eggs, Beans and Crumpets (1940)
- Two in A Few Quick Ones (1959)
- One in Plum Pie (1966)
- One in The World of Mr Mulliner (1972)

One story -- 1940's "Shock Dogs", which is more of a brief topical conversation than a story -- has never been reprinted or collected in any form outside of its original publication in Punch magazine. It is signed with initials only (P.G.W.) but the Articles and Verse listing in the bound Punch volume CXCVIIJ Jan-June 1940 attributes the story to Wodehouse, P. G. It mentions by name Hitler, Brauchitsch, and Goebbels, which is very unusual for an author who so seldom allowed politics to impinge on his novels and stories.

The World of Mr Mulliner is an omnibus containing 41 of the 43 stories narrated by Mr. Mulliner. It omits "Shock Dogs", and 1937's "Romance at Droitgate Spa", which appears in several other Wodehouse compilations but without the framework of Mr. Mulliner's narration. The World of Mr Mulliner also includes one other story which has a tangential connection to the series: "From a Detective's Notebook" (1959) is narrated by the detective Adrian Mulliner, who had previously been established as one of Mr. Mulliner's innumerable nephews. Strictly speaking, despite its appearance in the Mr. Mulliner omnibus, this tale cannot be considered a Mr. Mulliner story, as Mr. Mulliner does not narrate it, appear in it, and is not actually referenced in it in any way.

Also note that a handful of what were to become "Mr. Mulliner stories" were originally published in magazines without the framework of Mr. Mulliner telling the story in question. (These include three stories about Bobbie Wickham, as well as one about James Rodman.) When revised for book publication, Wodehouse added the Mulliner openings and narration — and it is these revised versions which appear in all Mulliner and Wodehouse anthologies to this day. These revised stories can often be distinguished by Mulliner identifying the prime character of the story as a "distant cousin" (or some other far-flung relation) whose surname is not Mulliner.

== Known relatives ==
Forebears:

- A Sieur de Moulinières "came over with the Conqueror", presumably in 1066.
- A Mulliner "once received the thanks of his Sovereign for services rendered on the field of Crecy". (The Battle of Crecy occurred in 1346.)

Grandmother:

- Unnamed. Died in the late 19th century. It is this grandmother who made William (below) pledge to not drink until he turned 21—or 41, William can't quite remember which.

Uncles:

- William Mulliner, a businessman; a survivor of the San Francisco earthquake of 1906. ("The Story of William")

Aunts:

- Myrtle Banks, married William

Brothers:

- Wilfred Mulliner, a chemist and inventor of various creams, lotions, and tonics, known in the trade as Mulliner's Magic Marvels. Featured mainly in A Slice of Life (short story) he also has a cameo role (Rev. Augustine Mulliner reads a letter from him) in Mulliner's Buck-U-Uppo, where the tonic Buck-U-Uppo is introduced. Wilfred marries Angela Purdue, the ward of Sir Jasper ffinch-ffarrowmere (with two small f's) and they have two sons, Percival who goes to a prep school in Sussex and Ferdinand who attends Eton College.
- Sir Sholto Mulliner, M.V.O.
- Joseph Mulliner, being the father of Bulstrode. (Mentioned in "The Castaways")

Sisters-in-law:

- Angela Purdue, married Wilfred ("A Slice of Life", Mulliner's Buck-U-Uppo)
- Lady Wilhelmina Mulliner, the widow of Sir Sholto Mulliner and the mother of Archibald. ("The Code of the Mulliners")

First cousins:

- John San Francisco Earthquake Mulliner, son of William and Myrtle
- (unnamed brother of above)
- Clarence Mulliner, photographer ("The Romance of a Bulb-Squeezer")
- Cedric Mulliner, a foppish bachelor of 45 years. ("The Story of Cedric")
- Lady Wickham, novelist under the pen-name "George Masterman"
- Edward Mulliner
- Rupert Mulliner; the father of Anselm. (Mentioned in "Anselm gets his Chance")
- Egbert Mulliner, civil servant ("Another Christmas Carol")

Cousins by marriage:

- Gladys Biggs, married Clarence
- Myrtle Watling, married Cedric
- Sir Cuthbert Wickham, married Lady Wickham

First cousins, once removed:

- Roberta "Bobbie" Wickham, daughter of Sir Cuthbert and Lady Wickham
- Lancelot Mulliner, an artist, Edward's son; a portrait painter in Bott St, London. Brought up by his uncle Theodore. ("The Story of Webster", "Cats Will Be Cats")
- Mervyn Mulliner, a son of a Mr Mulliner's cousin, being a chump. ("The Knightly Quest of Mervyn")
- Anselm Mulliner, a curate, Rupert's younger son ("Anselm Gets His Chance")
- (unnamed older brother of Anselm)

First cousin, once removed, by marriage:

- Gladys Bingley, married Lancelot

Distant cousins:

- James Rodman, mystery novelist
- Agnes Flack, championship golfer and "daughter of a distant cousin"
- Frederick Fitch-Fitch, prospective antique shop owner
- Montrose Mulliner, Assistant Director of the Perfecto-Zizzbaum Motion Picture Corp. of Hollywood ("Monkey Business")
- Wilmot Mulliner, a "nodder" at Perfecto-Zizzbaum ("The Nodder", "The Juice of an Orange")
- (unnamed), a young second cousin who has left his wife and is filing papers of divorce ("The Ordeal of Osbert Mulliner")

Distant cousins by marriage:

- Sidney George McMurdo, insurance executive and scratch golfer; marries Agnes
- Angela Purvis, conjurer's assistant; marries Frederick
- Rosalie Beamish, marries Montrose
- Mabel Potter, a private secretary and ex-bird imitator in Vaudeville; marries Wilmot

Nephews:

Note that Mr. Mulliner has three nephews named George, all different people.

- George Mulliner, a stammerer and crossword puzzle enthusiast, being in love with Susan Blake. ("The Truth About George")
- Ferdinand Mulliner, studying at Eton (older son of Wilfred and Angela).
- Percival Mulliner, at preparatory school in Sussex (younger son of Wilfred and Angela).
- Augustine Mulliner, being a meek curate who eventually rose to become vicar of Walsingford-below-Chiveney-on-Thames thanks to the Buck-U-Uppo tonic invented by Wilfred Mulliner. (Mulliner's Buck-U-Uppo, "The Bishop's Move", "Gala Night")
- (name unknown), a student at Harchester, younger brother of Augustine.
- Lancelot Bassington Mulliner, an aspiring poet. ("Came the Dawn")
- Osbert Mulliner, a rich jade collector. ("The Ordeal of Osbert Mulliner")
- Frederick Mulliner, brother of Dr. George. ("Portrait of a Disciplinarian")
- Dr. George Mulliner, brother of Frederick.
- Archibald Mulliner, son of Sir Sholto and Lady Wilhelmina, who does a masterful impression of a hen laying an egg; a member of the Drones Club and a sock collector. Engaged to Aurelia Cammarleigh. ("The Reverent Wooing of Archibald", "Archibald and the Masses", "The Code of the Mulliners"; mentioned in "The Fat of the Land")
- Ignatius Mulliner, portrait painter and ukulele player. ("The Man Who Gave Up Smoking")
- Mordred Mulliner, a poet and an accidental pyromaniac. ("The Fiery Wooing of Mordred")
- Adrian Mulliner, a private detective who possesses a sinister smile. ("The Smile That Wins", "From a Detective's Notebook")
- Sacheverall Mulliner, a very timid man who suffers from Headmaster Phobia. ("The Voice From the Past")
- Eustace Mulliner, attached to the British Embassy in Switzerland. ("Open House")
- Egbert Mulliner, assistant editor of 'The Weekly Booklover'. (Best Seller)
- Cyril Mulliner, interior decorator and avid reader of mystery novels. (Strychnine in the Soup)
- Bulstrode Mulliner (son of Joseph Mulliner), screenwriter in Hollywood. ("The Castaways")
- Brancepeth Mulliner, an artist in search of a character. ("Buried Treasure")
- Augustus Mulliner, in love with Hermione Brimble. ("The Right Approach")
- Reginald Mulliner, inheritor of a substantial sum of money ("Big Business")
- George Mulliner, screenwriter in Hollywood, identical twin of Alfred ("George and Alfred")
- Alfred Mulliner, professional conjurer known as the Great Alfredo, identical twin of George ("George and Alfred")

Nephews by marriage:

- Aubrey Bassinger, married Charlotte

Nieces:

- Charlotte Mulliner, a poet writing "Vignettes in Verse". ("The Unpleasantness at Bludleigh Court")

Nieces by marriage:

- Aurelia Cammerleigh, married Archibald
- Annabella Spockett-Sprockett, married Mordred
- Hermione Rossiter, married Ignatius
- Mabel Petherick-Soames, married Osbert
- Evangeline Pembury, novelist, married Egbert (Best Seller)
- Amelia Bassett, married Cyril
- Jane, married Augustine
- Hermione Brimble, married Augustus
- Jane Oliphant, married Frederick
- Lady Millicent Shipton-Bellinger, married Adrian
- Muriel Branksome, married Sacheverell
- Susan Blake, married George (her fellow crossword puzzle enthusiast)

Nature of relationship uncertain:

- Theophilus Mulliner, the bishop of Bognor ("The Right Approach")

== Other minor characters ==
- Aurelia Cammarleigh is a handsome girl, being the one Archibald Mulliner falls in love with. ("The Reverent Wooing of Archibald", "Archibald and the Masses", "The Code of the Mulliners")
- Algernon "Algy" Wymondham-Wymondham is a member of the Drones Club, being the one helped his fellow Archibald Mulliner find back the anonymous girls of his dreams, Aurelia Cammarleigh.("The Reverent Wooing of Archibald")

== Original appearances ==
1. "The Truth about George"
  - U.K.: Strand, July 1926
  - U.S.: Liberty, 3 July 1926
2. "A Slice of Life"
  - U.K.: Strand, August 1926
  - U.S.: Liberty, 7 August 1926
3. "Mulliner's Buck-U-Uppo"
  - U.K.: Strand, November 1926
  - U.S.: Liberty, 4 September 1926
4. "The Romance of a Bulb-Squeezer"
  - U.K.: Strand, March 1927
  - U.S.: Liberty, 12 March 1927
5. "The Story of William"
  - U.K.: Strand, May 1927
  - U.S.: Liberty, 9 April 1927 (as "It Was Only a Fire")
6. "Those in Peril on the Tee"
  - UK: Strand, June 1927
  - US: Liberty, 21 May 1927
    - Original UK version is narrated by the Oldest Member, not Mr. Mulliner.
7. "Came the Dawn"
  - U.K.: Strand, July 1927
  - U.S.: Liberty, 11 June 1927
8. "The Bishop's Move"
  - U.K.: Strand, September 1927
  - U.S.: Liberty, 20 August 1927
9. "Portrait of a Disciplinarian"
  - U.K.: Strand, October 1927
  - U.S.: Liberty, 24 September 1927
10. "Honeysuckle Cottage"
  - Initially published without Mr. Mulliner framework
    - U.K.: Strand, February 1925
    - U.S.: Saturday Evening Post, 24 January 1925
  - Subsequently, rewritten. First appearance as a Mr. Mulliner story in Meet Mr. Mulliner, September 1927
11. "The Reverent Wooing of Archibald"
  - UK: Strand, August 1928
  - US: Cosmopolitan, September 1928
12. "The Ordeal of Osbert Mulliner"
  - UK: Strand, December 1928
  - US: Liberty, 24 November 1928
13. "Unpleasantness at Bludleigh Court"
  - UK: Strand, February 1929
  - US: Liberty, 2 February 1929
14. "The Man Who Gave Up Smoking"
  - UK: Strand, March 1929
  - US: Liberty, 23 March 1929
15. "The Story of Cedric"
  - UK: Strand, May 1929
  - US: Liberty, 11 May 1929
16. "Something Squishy"
  - Initially published without Mr. Mulliner framework
    - UK: Strand, January 1925
    - US: Saturday Evening Post, 20 December 1924
  - Subsequently, rewritten. First appearance as a Mr. Mulliner story in Mr. Mulliner Speaking, April 1929
17. "The Awful Gladness of the Mater"
  - Initially published without Mr. Mulliner framework
    - UK: Strand, May 1925
    - US: Saturday Evening Post, 21 March 1925
  - Subsequently, rewritten. First appearance as a Mr. Mulliner story in Mr. Mulliner Speaking, April 1929
18. "The Passing of Ambrose"
  - Initially published without Mr. Mulliner framework
    - UK: Strand, July 1928
    - US: Cosmopolitan, August 1928
  - Subsequently, rewritten. First appearance as a Mr. Mulliner story in Mr. Mulliner Speaking, April 1929
19. "Gala Night"
  - UK: Strand, June 1930
  - US: Cosmopolitan, May 1930
20. "Best Seller"
  - Early version published without Mr. Mulliner framework as "Parted Ways"
    - UK: Strand, December 1914
    - US: Pictorial Review, June 1915
  - Subsequently, rewritten. First appearance as a Mr. Mulliner story:
    - UK: Strand, July 1930
    - US: Cosmopolitan, June 1930
21. "The Knightly Quest of Mervyn"
  - UK: Strand, July 1931 (as "Quest")
  - US: Cosmopolitan, April 1931 (as "Quest")
22. "The Voice from the Past"
  - UK: Strand, December 1931
  - US: American, November 1931
23. "The Smile that Wins"
  - UK: Strand, February 1932
  - US: American, October 1931
24. "Strychnine in the Soup"
  - UK: Strand, March 1932
  - US: American, December 1931 (as "The Missing Mystery")
25. "The Story of Webster"
  - UK: Strand, May 1932 (as "The Bishop's Cat")
  - US: American, February 1932
26. "Cats will be Cats"
  - UK: Strand, June 1932 (as "The Bishop's Folly")
  - US: American, March 1932 (as "The Bishop's Folly")
27. "Open House"
  - UK: Strand, April 1932
  - US: American, April 1932
28. "Monkey Business"
  - UK: Strand, December 1932
  - US: American Magazine, December 1932 (as "A Cagey Gorilla")
29. "The Nodder"
  - UK: Strand, January 1933
  - US: American Magazine, January 1933 (as "Love Birds")
30. "The Juice of an Orange"
  - UK: Strand, February 1933
  - US: American Magazine, February 1933 (as "Love on a Diet")
31. "The Rise of Minna Nordstrom"
  - Early US version published without Mr. Mulliner framework; UK version is narrated by Mr. Mulliner
  - UK: Strand, April 1933
  - US: American Magazine, March 1933 (as "A Star is Born")
32. "The Castaways"
  - UK: Strand, June 1933
33. "The Fiery Wooing of Mordred"
  - US: Cosmopolitan, December 1934
  - UK: Strand, February 1935
34. "Archibald and the Masses"
  - US: Cosmopolitan, August 1935
  - UK: Strand, February 1936
35. "The Code of the Mulliners"
  - US: Cosmopolitan, February 1935
  - UK: Strand, April 1935
36. "Buried Treasure"
  - UK: Strand, September 1936
  - US: This Week, 27 September 1936 (as "Hidden Treasure")
37. "Romance at Droitgate Spa"
  - Early version published without Mr. Mulliner framework
  - US: Saturday Evening Post, 20 February 1937
  - UK: Strand, August 1937
  - Subsequently, rewritten. First -- and ONLY -- appearance as a Mr. Mulliner story in the 1937 US-only book The Crime Wave at Blandings. All further appearances of this story revert to the pre-Mulliner version. Not collected in The World of Mr. Mulliner.
38. "Anselm Gets His Chance"
  - US: Saturday Evening Post, 3 July 1937
  - UK: Strand, July 1937
39. "Shock Dogs"
  - UK: Punch, 14 February 1940
  - A very brief topical discussion, never reprinted. Not collected in The World of Mr. Mulliner.
40. "The Right Approach"
  - Early version published without Mr. Mulliner framework as "Joy Bells For Barmy"
    - US: Cosmopolitan, October 1947
  - Subsequently rewritten to also incorporate plot elements (but not the characters) from a 1940 Bobbie Wickham story, "Dudley Is Back To Normal". These 1958/59 versions, now called "The Right Approach", are slightly different from each other, and neither has a Mr. Mulliner framework.
    - UK: Lilliput, September 1958
    - US: Playboy, January 1959
  - Subsequently, rewritten yet again. First appearance as a Mr. Mulliner story in the 1959 book A Few Quick Ones
41. "Big Business"
  - Early version published without Mr. Mulliner framework
    - US: Collier's, 13 December 1952
    - UK: Lilliput, March/April 1953
  - Subsequently, rewritten. First appearance as a Mr. Mulliner story in the 1959 book A Few Quick Ones
42. "George and Alfred"
  - Early version published without Mr. Mulliner framework as "Rallying Round Old George"
    - UK: Strand Magazine, December 1912
    - US: Collier's Weekly, 27 September 1913 (as "Brother Alfred")
  - Subsequently, rewritten. First appearance as a Mr. Mulliner story:
    - US: Playboy, January 1967
43. "Another Christmas Carol"
  - Early version published without Mr. Mulliner framework
    - US: Playboy, December 1970
  - Subsequently, rewritten. First appearance as a Mr. Mulliner story in the 1972 book The World of Mr. Mulliner

== Adaptations ==
Fourteen Mulliner stories were adapted for television as part of the 1974–1978 television series Wodehouse Playhouse, though Mr Mulliner himself only appeared in the pilot episode. In the episode, "The Reverent Wooing of Archibald", Mr Mulliner was portrayed by William Mervyn.

BBC Radio 4, in 2002, aired a series of 15-minute adaptations by Roger Davenport of the short stories in six episodes, under the title Meet Mr Mulliner, with Richard Griffiths starring as the narrator, Mr Mulliner and directed by Ned Chaillet. An ensemble cast of Matilda Ziegler as Miss Postlethwaite with Peter Acre, Sandra Clark, Tom George, Martin Hyder, Carl Prekopp, Marlene Sidaway, David Timson in a variety of roles performed the playlets. In 2004, a further four episodes under the title More Mr Mulliner were broadcast.
