= Mulliner Nights =

1933 short story collection by P. G. Wodehouse

First edition (UK)

Mulliner Nights is a collection of short stories by P. G. Wodehouse. First published in the United Kingdom on 17 January 1933 by Herbert Jenkins, and in the United States on 15 February 1933 by Doubleday, Doran. The stories in the collection were originally published in magazines in the UK and the US between 1930 and 1932.

The book is the third collection featuring Mr Mulliner, who narrates all nine stories contained in the book, telling tall tales of his diverse family.

== Contents ==
=== "The Smile that Wins" ===
- US: American, October 1931
- UK: Strand, February 1932

See "The Smile that Wins".

=== "The Story of Webster" ===
- US: American, February 1932 (as "The Bishop's Cat")
- UK: Strand, May 1932 (as "The Bishop's Cat")

Plot

Mr Mulliner says that many cats have an air of superiority, and tells a story which features a cat and Mr Mulliner's cousin Edward's son, Lancelot.

25-year-old Lancelot was orphaned at an early age and was raised by his Uncle Theodore, the saintly Dean of Bolsover. Lancelot becomes a portrait artist and takes a studio in Chelsea. The Dean disapproves and thinks Lancelot should become a curate, which leads to distance between them. Lancelot gets engaged to poet Gladys Bingley. His uncle accepts the post of Bishop of Bongo-Bongo in West Africa and sends a letter to Lancelot telling him to look after his cat Webster. Lancelot hopes that if he treats the cat well then he may be able to get enough money from his rich uncle to marry Gladys. The Dean believes that Webster is an upstanding cat and he will inspire Lancelot to become less bohemian and more respectable.

Webster, a large black cat, is very austere, and Lancelot feels pressured by Webster's judgmental gaze to act and dress according to proper etiquette. Two of Lancelot's friends become concerned and try to tell him not to give in to the cat, but it is no use. Webster does not appear to approve of Gladys, so Lancelot gets engaged to Brenda Carberry-Pirbright, who seems prim and unpleasant, to please Webster. Lancelot's friends wire Gladys Bingley, who is away in France, to come reason with Lancelot. She confronts him about his engagement to Brenda. He tells he does not want to marry Brenda but feels he must do what Webster wishes. She tells him to come see her only if he chooses her over Brenda, and leaves. Lancelot, nervous in front of Webster, drops a bottle of whisky onto the floor, and is stunned to see Webster drink it. Webster becomes genial and breaks into a dance, then turns belligerent and attacks a footstool. After seeing this spectacle, Lancelot is no longer intimidated by Webster and goes to see Gladys and reunite with her.

=== "Cats will be Cats" ===
- US: American, March 1932 (as "The Bishop's Folly")
- UK: Strand, June 1932 (as "The Bishop's Folly")

Plot

A Whisky and Splash at the Angler's Rest asks Mr Mulliner what happened to Webster, the cat from the previous story, which leads to Mr Mulliner telling the following tale.

After his encounter with alcohol, Webster has completely changed into a bohemian, unsophisticated cat that freely brawls with other cats on the street. Lancelot, who is still supposed to be looking after Webster, learns that his uncle will be returning from Africa soon. Lancelot is nervous, since his uncle will notice that Webster bears obvious signs of having been in fights. However, Lancelot's uncle does not come to see Lancelot. He sends a letter saying that he is at Widdrington Manor in Hampshire, the home of the widowed Lady Widdrington and her mother, Mrs Pulteney-Banks. Lady Widdrington has a cat named Percy. Uncle Theodore disapproves of Percy, since he saw Percy getting into a fight with another cat, so does not want Webster to join him there and tells Lancelot to keep him for a little while longer. Lancelot and his fiancée Gladys now have time to reform Webster. They both want to please Lancelot's rich uncle so he will give them money to get married.

They are only able to improve Webster's appearance slightly before Lancelot is summoned to Widdrington Manor by his uncle, who wants Lancelot to pretend to be his lawyer. At the house, the Bishop explains that he pretended Lancelot was his lawyer as part of a failed attempt to get away from the house. During his voyage back to England, he got carried away in the romantic shipboard atmosphere and courted Lady Widdrington, but now wants to avoid her. Lady Widdrington and her mother are determined and counter every excuse the Bishop has to leave the house. The Bishop wants Lancelot to stay by him and prevent him from getting engaged to Lady Widdrington. He will reward Lancelot with enough money to marry Gladys. The Bishop tries to sneak out at night, but is caught by Percy and pretends he was walking in his sleep. Mrs Pulteney-Banks can tell why the Bishop wants to leave, but Lady Widdrington believes he must merely be missing his cat Webster. Webster is brought to the Bishop, and he is alarmed at the cat's toughened appearance. However, after Percy appears and gets into a fight with Webster, the Bishop cheers Webster on. Percy loses and flees. Lady Widdrington is angered by Webster and wants the Bishop to leave. The Bishop happily embraces Webster and pays Lancelot.

=== "The Knightly Quest of Mervyn" ===
- US: Cosmopolitan, April 1931 (as "Quest")
- UK: Strand, July 1931 (as "Quest")

The magazine version of the story, "Quest", features Freddie Widgeon and does not include Mr Mulliner.

Plot

Someone sings a song about chivalry and knights in the room across the passage from the bar-parlour of the Angler's Rest. Mr Mulliner states that the chivalrous spirit of knights still flourishes in the Mulliners, which can be seen in the story of his cousin's son Mervyn.

Mervyn Mulliner wants to marry Clarice Mallaby. She thinks he is a chump and does not consent to marry him. Mervyn wants to prove himself and asks her to give him a quest, like the knights of old. It is December, and she has always wanted to eat strawberries in the middle of winter, so she tells Mervyn that she will reconsider his proposal of marriage if he acquires a basket of strawberries for her before the end of the month. Mervyn has a wealthy acquaintance, Oofy Prosser, who gives lavish parties with expensive food and would know how to get strawberries in December. Oofy tells Mervyn that strawberries can be bought at Bellamy's in Piccadilly, for around a pound apiece. Mervyn only has one pound, two shillings and threepence in his pocket. Mervyn's maternal uncle Joseph, Lord Blotsam, has an account at Bellamy's, so Mervyn goes there and tries to buy a basket of strawberries on his uncle's account. The woman in the shop telephones his uncle, who says he does not want to buy any strawberries. Mervyn pretends his uncle was joking and tries to take the strawberries anyway. He is quickly arrested.

Mervyn is sentenced to a ten-pound fine or fourteen days in jail. He sends a message to his uncle who sends ten pounds for the fine and orders him to Blotsam Regis in Shropshire, where he will not be able to get into trouble and embarrass his uncle further. At the house, Mervyn sees strawberries in a hothouse, which are for Lord Blotsam's upcoming Christmas party. Mervyn quickly puts some of the strawberries in a box and returns to London. He reaches London, but accidentally leaves the box of strawberries in the train. Next, he tries to borrow money from Oofy Prosser to buy strawberries for Clarice. Oofy refuses to give him any money but is interested to hear about Clarice's quest. Mervyn goes to Clarice's house in Eaton Square, hoping she will give him credit for having tried his best. A boy delivers a parcel and gives it to Mervyn, mistakenly thinking he is the butler. The package has strawberries for Clarice from Oofy, who tried to win Clarice's favour. Mervyn is annoyed with Oofy but gets an idea and calls out to Clarice that he brought her strawberries. However, by the time she reaches the room, he has absent-mindedly eaten all the strawberries. Clarice throws him out. He failed his quest, but Mr Mulliner commends his effort.

=== "The Voice from the Past" ===
- US: American, November 1931
- UK: Strand, December 1931

Plot

A change of headmasters in the public school near the Angler's Rest leads to Mr Mulliner telling a tale about his mild and timid nephew Sacheverell Mulliner, whose shyness Mr Mulliner attributes to the intimidating headmaster Sacheverell had to deal with as a boy.

Sacheverell Mulliner, a diffident young man, is secretly engaged to the hearty Muriel Branksome, daughter of Lieutenant-Colonel Sir Redvers Branksome. Muriel Branksome was once engaged to her cousin Bernard, but broke it off because he was too bossy. Muriel invites Sacheverell to her house, Branksome Towers, but he does not get along well with her father, who talks about farming and hunting whereas Sacheverell is interested in literature and ballet. Muriel suggests that Sacheverell take a correspondence course in Scientific Agriculture so he can easily converse with Sir Redvers. Back in London, Sacheverell pays for and starts his correspondence course. After several lessons, he realizes he has been taught nothing about agriculture. He goes to the headquarters of the Leave-It-To-Us Correspondence School to complain. He makes his strongly-worded complaint to the manager, Jno B. Philbrick, who explains that the wrong course was sent to Sacheverell, and it has apparently worked, since Sacheverell actually received a course on acquiring self-confidence. Sacheverell continues taking the self-confidence course and becomes even more assertive.

Sacheverell sees Muriel in a cab with her cousin Bernard, and becomes jealous. Later, he tells Muriel not to see Bernard again. Muriel is not pleased with Sacheverell's new domineering attitude. Back at Branksome Towers, Sacheverell is upset to see that Bernard is also there. The Bishop of Bognor will also be visiting. Muriel tells Sacheverell that he will not be in the Blue Suite, which is the best guest room, and Sacheverell assumes that she has given it to Bernard. At dinner, Lieutenant-Colonel Sir Redvers initially refuses to eat spinach, but does so when Sacheverell tells him to. Muriel informs Sacheverell she will not marry him, since he has become bossy. Sacheverell thinks she has left him for Bernard, so he hides in the Blue Room to confront Bernard. However, it is actually the Bishop who comes to the room. The Bishop was Sacheverell's headmaster, the Rev. J. G. Smethurst. Sacheverell is affected by his old headmaster's voice and loses all his assertiveness. He tries to escape but accidentally goes into the suite's bathroom. The Bishop hears him and alerts Sir Redvers. They think there is a burglar and arm themselves with weapons. Sacheverell climbs out through a window and reaches Muriel's room. She sees he is afraid and helps him hide. Sacheverell is diffident again, so Muriel loves him and will marry him. He stops taking the correspondence course, and is too shy to ask for a refund.

=== "Open House" ===
- UK: Strand, April 1932
- US: American, April 1932

Plot

Mr Mulliner tells his listeners about his nephew Eustace Mulliner. Eustace is a successful employee of the British Embassy in Switzerland, though at one time he was reluctant to take the job, as Mr Mulliner explains.

Eustace's godfather, Lord Knubble of Knopp, uses his influence to get Eustace a job offer at the British Embassy in Switzerland, but Eustace wants to stay in London. He is the favourite nephew of his wealthy and elderly Aunt Georgiana, Lady Beazley-Beazley, and wants to continue earning her affection to stay in her will. Eustace also wants to court Marcella Tyrrwhit. She is leaving for Paris and asks Eustace to look after her two pets, Reginald the Pekingese dog and William the canary. A week or so earlier, Eustace was in love with someone else, Beatrice Watterson, and plans to end his courtship with her gradually and tactfully while Marcella is away. Eustace invites Beatrice to his flat for lunch for her birthday and remarks that he must get her a nice present. Eustace plans to be away visiting his Aunt Georgiana on that day, so Beatrice will be offended when he is absent.

It is sunny, so Eustace puts William's cage on the window-sill to enjoy the sunlight. William is singing on the window-sill when a man Orlando Wotherspoon comes to Eustace's flat. Wotherspoon is the vice president of Our Dumb Chums' League, an animal welfare organization, and thinks Eustace is cruel for putting a canary out in the sun. The dog Reginald is startled by Wotherspoon's large moustache, but Wotherspoon misunderstands and claims that Reginald is scared of Eustace. Wotherspoon leaves him with a warning but will check on Eustace's treatment of the animals again. Later, Eustace prepares to visit his aunt. He tells his valet Blenkinsop to explain his absence to Beatrice and give her anything she wants. Eustace later returns to find that Blenkinsop took this literally and gave Beatrice the dog. Eustace plans to tell Marcella that Blenkinsop lost the dog. Aunt Georgiana visits Eustace and brings her cat, Francis. William is capable of dodging Francis, but Eustace tries to stop the cat nonetheless by throwing food at it. His aunt, Marcella, and Wotherspoon all see this and are displeased. Marcella saw Beatrice with her dog in Paris and came to confront Eustace. While the three of them discuss how to deal with Eustace, he flees. Mr Mulliner gives him tickets to Switzerland. He is now doing well at the Embassy.

=== "Best Seller" ===
- US: Cosmopolitan, June 1930 (without Mr Mulliner)
- UK: Strand, July 1930

See "Best Seller".

=== "Strychnine in the Soup" ===
- US: American, December 1931 (as "The Missing Mystery")
- UK: Strand, March 1932

See "Strychnine in the Soup".

=== "Gala Night" ===
- US: Cosmopolitan, May 1930
- UK: Strand, June 1930

Plot

Mr Mulliner tells another story about his nephew Augustine Mulliner, now a vicar. (Augustine previously appeared in "Mulliner's Buck-U-Uppo" and "The Bishop's Move"). The tale involves Ronald Bracy-Gascoigne, a young man of independent means living in Augustine's village, and Hypatia Wace, a friend of Augustine's wife Jane and niece of Augustine's superior, the Bishop of Stortford.

Ronald and Hypatia are engaged, and need the Bishop's consent to marry. Hypatia's Uncle Percy and Aunt Priscilla, the Bishop and his wife, disapprove of Ronald because he was expelled from Oxford and dances at night clubs. They see the Rev. Augustine Mulliner, who is cheerful and energetic because he takes a tonic called Mulliner's Buck-U-Uppo, and Ronald suggests that they give some of the tonic to the Bishop so he will be more accepting of him. Ronald thinks he has no chance of marrying Hypatia, and they make plans to have a goodbye dance at a night club which is having a Gala Night, fancy dress optional. Augustine is more optimistic and tells Hypatia he will help her marry Ronald. Augustine tries to convince Hypatia's aunt and uncle to accept Ronald, but is unsuccessful.

Later, the Bishop is strangely cheerful and borrows a Sindbad the Sailor costume from Augustine. Augustine remembers seeing the Bishop acting similarly once before when he took some Buck-U-Uppo (during the events of "The Bishop's Move"). Ronald and Hypatia do not go to the Gala Night since Ronald hears there will be a police raid. Hypatia tells Augustine she gave the Bishop and his wife some Buck-U-Uppo. Augustine realizes she gave them too much. Hypatia says her aunt borrowed a Columbine costume from her. Hypatia and Augustine realize the two went to the Gala Night. The Bishop and his wife dance at the party and come back, chased by a policeman named Cyril Smith. After Augustine gives Cyril a drink with Buck-U-Uppo, Cyril becomes friendly. The Bishop and his wife cheerfully consent to Hypatia marrying Ronald. Hypatia, her aunt and uncle, and Cyril all go to wake up Ronald and tell him the good news. Augustine has to stay behind to write a sermon but is very happy for them.

== Publication history ==
In The Strand Magazine (UK), Treyer Evans illustrated "The Smile that Wins", "The Voice from the Past", "Open House", "Quest" ("The Knightly Quest of Mervyn"), and "Strychnine in the Soup". Charles Crombie illustrated "Best Seller" and "Gala Night". Gilbert Wilkinson illustrated "The Bishop's Cat" ("The Story of Webster") and "The Bishop's Folly" ("Cats will be Cats").

In The American Magazine (US), Roy F. Spreter illustrated "The Smile that Wins", "The Bishop's Cat" ("The Story of Webster"), "The Bishop's Folly" ("Cats will be Cats"), "A Voice from the Past", "Open House", and "The Missing Mystery" ("Strychnine in the Soup"). In Cosmopolitan, James Montgomery Flagg illustrated "Quest" ("The Knightly Quest of Mervyn"), "Best Seller", and "Gala Knight".

"The Story of Webster" was printed in the Family Herald and Weekly Star (Montreal, Canada) on 19 September 1934 with illustrations by James H. Hammon.

The 1939 collection The Week-End Wodehouse (US edition) included "The Smile that Wins", "Cats will be Cats", "The Voice from the Past", "Best Seller", and "Strychnine in the Soup". "The Story of Webster", "Cats will be Cats", "The Voice from the Past", and "Gala Night" were featured in the collection The World of Wodehouse Clergy, published by Hutchinson in 1984. The Wodehouse collection titled Short Stories, published by The Folio Society in 1983, included "The Story of Webster". A Wodehouse Bestiary, published in 1985 by Ticknor & Fields, included "The Story of Webster" and "Open House". The magazine version of "Quest" was printed separately with its original illustrations as a short book in April 1975.

The stories were included in the Mulliner Omnibus, published in 1935, and in the 1972 collection The World of Mr. Mulliner.

"The Story of Webster" has been included in multiple anthologies, including Just Cats: Stories Grave and Gay of the Hearthside Tyrant (published in New York, 1934, under the title "Bishop's Cat"), Best Cat Stories (London, 1952, illustrated by Eileen Mayo), A Treasury of Humor and Toastmaster's Handbook (New York, 1955), A Quorum of Cats (London, 1963), The World's Best Cat Stories (New York, 1970), The Literary Cat (New York, 1977), and Great Cats: The Who's Who of Famous Felines (Toronto, 1981). "Cats will be Cats" was included in the 1944 US anthology Treasury of Cat Stories.

== Adaptations ==
"The Smile that Wins", "The Voice from the Past", and "Strychnine in the Soup" were adapted as episodes of Wodehouse Playhouse (1974–78).

Multiple Mulliner stories were adapted for radio, with Richard Griffiths as Mr Mulliner, in 2002 and 2004. Among these stories were "The Smile that Wins", "The Knightly Quest of Mervyn", and "Open House".

== See also ==
- Meet Mr Mulliner (1927) and Mr Mulliner Speaking (1929) – Two other collections of Mulliner stories
- Complete list of Wodehouse's Mr Mulliner stories
