= Bestseller (disambiguation) =

A bestseller is a book or some other form of media noted for its top selling status.

Bestseller or Best Seller may also refer to:

== Film and television ==
- Best Seller, a 1987 film by John Flynn
- Bestseller (film), a 2010 South Korean mystery thriller film
- Bestseller (TV series), a 2022 Indian suspense thriller web series
- Best Sellers (TV series), a 1976–1977 NBC series
- Bestsellers (web series), an American comedy web television series
- Best Sellers (film), a 2021 film by Lina Roessler

== Other uses ==
- Bestseller (company), a Danish clothing company
- Bestseller (music), a song or album charted on a bestsellers list such as Billboard's
- "Best Seller" (short story), a 1930 short story by P. G. Wodehouse

== See also ==
- Top Sellers Ltd, an imprint of Thorpe & Porter
- List of best-selling albums
- List of best-selling books
- List of best-selling music artists
- List of best-selling video games
- The New York Times Best Seller list
