= Honeysuckle Cottage =

1925 short story by P. G. Wodehouse

- Short story by P. G. Wodehouse
- Country: United Kingdom
- Language: English
- Genre: Comedy

Publication
- Publisher: Saturday Evening Post (US); Strand (UK)
- Media type: Print (Magazine)
- Publication date: 24 January 1925 (US); February 1925 (UK)

"Honeysuckle Cottage" is a short story by the British author P. G. Wodehouse. The story was first published in the 24 January 1925 issue of the Saturday Evening Post in the United States, and in the February 1925 issue of the Strand Magazine in the United Kingdom.

Wodehouse subsequently added a framing device in which the story is told by the character of Mr. Mulliner. It is this version which appears in the 1927 short story collection Meet Mr. Mulliner, and subsequent Wodehouse collections.

Considered by Wodehouse himself to be one of his funniest stories, the story has been viewed as a homage to the writer Henry James. The philosopher Ludwig Wittgenstein thought it the funniest thing he had ever read, according to his memoir.

== Plot ==
Mr Mulliner tells the following story about his distant cousin James Rodman, a mystery novelist who, according to Mulliner, spent some weeks in a house haunted by the influence of a romance novelist.

James Rodman receives an inheritance from his late aunt, romance novelist Leila J. Pinckney, consisting of five thousand pounds and her house in the country, Honeysuckle Cottage. She wrote many sentimental romance stories there. Her will states that James must reside in Honeysuckle Cottage for six months in every year, or he forfeits the money. James moves into the cottage. According to Mr Mulliner, Leila Pinckney had disapproved of James Rodman's detective stories. She put the clause in her will because she believed in the influence of environment and wanted James to move away from London. Generally, James likes the house, though he is annoyed by William, a noisy mixed-breed dog.

In the cottage, James works on a mystery novel, The Secret Nine. He is perplexed to find himself writing a love interest into the novel and tries to keep her out of the story. An admirer of Pinckney's novels, Rose Maynard, visits the house. She is injured when struck by a car outside the cottage gates, and James reluctantly lets her recover at the house. The doctor and housekeeper act as if they are in a Pinckney novel and encourage a romance between them. James becomes concerned that the house is haunted, not by his aunt but by her influence. Even Rodman's tough literary agent Andrew McKinney becomes sentimental when visiting the cottage. James feels that the house will compel him to propose to Rose. A confirmed bachelor, he struggles against this unwelcome fate.

Colonel Henry Carteret, Rose's guardian, arrives. It was Rose's father's dying wish that she should marry Carteret. After James rescues Rose's little dog Toto from the river, though the dog apparently could swim anyway, Rose tells Carteret she will not marry him. Carteret accepts that Rose has chosen James, to James's dismay. James resists proposing to Rose, but this angers Carteret, who thinks James may be trifling with her affections and intimidates James into proposing. James is appalled to hear himself speaking like a Pinckney character as he proposes to Rose. William interrupts him by causing hot tea to spill on his trousers, and chases Rose's dog. James chases William. Far from the cottage, James catches up to William. When William licks his face, James realizes that William saved him. They flee together to London, and are now inseparable companions.

== Background ==
According to Robert McCrum, "Honeysuckle Cottage" is a parody of popular novelettes and was also influenced by Wodehouse's interest in spiritualism. Seances were popular during the inter-war years in England, and Wodehouse attended a seance in 1924, another in January 1925, and a third in April 1925. McCrum writes that Wodehouse was generally agnostic, but was interested in mystical subjects.

In an article published in The Henry James Review, Marijane R. Davis Wernsman writes that there are parallels between the story and Henry James's novel The Turn of the Screw (1898), which is mentioned by name early in "Honeysuckle Cottage". For example, each story is told by an uninvolved narrator and concerns an isolated haunted house that is near London but in the countryside. Wernsman also states that Wodehouse derived some of the names of characters in the story from Henry James. Colonel Carteret's first name is Henry, and the main character's first name is James. Carteret is also the name of a character in Henry James's The Tragic Muse (1890) who convinces the hero, a younger man, to marry.

== Publication history ==
The story was published in The Saturday Evening Post with illustrations by George Wright. Treyer Evans illustrated the story in the Strand. The story was published in The Magazine of Fantasy & Science Fiction (US) in December 1958.

"Honeysuckle Cottage" was included in Meet Mr Mulliner (1927). It was collected in the Mulliner Omnibus, published in 1935 by Herbert Jenkins Limited, and in The World of Mr. Mulliner, published in the UK in 1972 by Barrie & Jenkins and issued in the US by the Taplinger Publishing Company in 1974. It was featured in the 1978 collection Vintage Wodehouse, edited by Richard Usborne and published by Barrie & Jenkins.

Wodehouse chose the story for inclusion in the anthology My Funniest Story: An Anthology of Stories Chosen by Their Own Authors, published by Faber and Faber, London, in 1932. It was also included in the anthology The Book of Laughter, published by Allied Newspapers, Manchester, in 1938, along with another Wodehouse story, "Jeeves and the Kid Clementina".

"Honeysuckle Cottage" was published as a small book by Galley Beggar Press in 2014. It was included in the anthology Ghostly: A Collection of Ghost Stories (2015), which was edited and illustrated by Audrey Niffenegger.

== Adaptations ==
"Honeysuckle Cottage" was adapted for radio by Andrew Seacombe and aired on 1 January 1957 on the BBC Home Service. The cast included Robin Bailey as James Rodman, Olive Gregg as Rose Maynard, Arthur Ridley as Dr Brady, Brewster Mason as Mr McKinnon, Michael Shepley as Colonel Carteret, and Bryan Powley as William, the dog. The producer was H. B. Fortuin.

A film adaptation was planned by Avenue Pictures, which bought the rights to the story. The script was co-written by Curtis Armstrong and John Doolittle, and the film would have starred Val Kilmer and Penelope Ann Miller, with Christopher Guest directing. The film was cancelled in October 1990 shortly before production was supposed to start.

The story was adapted as a radio drama as part of a radio series of Mulliner stories dramatised by Roger Davenport and directed by Ned Chaillet, with Richard Griffiths as Mr Mulliner. The episode aired on 29 April 2002 on BBC Radio 4. The cast also included Matilda Ziegler as Miss Postlethwaite and Rose, Peter Acre as a Port and Dr Brady, Martin Hyder as a Light Ale and McKinnon, David Timson as a Pint of Stout and Colonel Carteret, and Tom George as a Small Bitter and James.

== See also ==
- List of Wodehouse's Mr Mulliner stories
