= Strychnine in the Soup =

1931 short story by P. G. Wodehouse

- Short story by P. G. Wodehouse
- Language: English
- Genre: Comedy

Publication
- Publisher: American Magazine (US); Strand (UK)
- Media type: Print (Magazine)
- Publication date: December 1931 (US); March 1932 (UK)

"Strychnine in the Soup" is a short story by the British comic writer P. G. Wodehouse. A part of the Mr. Mulliner series, the story was first published in the US in The American Magazine in December 1931 (as "A Missing Mystery"), and in the UK in The Strand Magazine in March 1932. It also appears in the collection Mulliner Nights (1933).

== Plot ==
Cyril Mulliner, an interior decorator with a passion for mystery stories, finds a handful of his flesh being twisted by the lovely Amelia Bassett at a showing of The Grey Vampire and the two fall instantly in love with each other. Fate, however, has thrown a spanner in the works, in the form of Amelia's mother, Lady Bassett, a well-known big game hunter and explorer, who objects to an interior decorator as a son-in-law, preferring that Amelia marry Lester Mapledurham ("pronounced 'Mum'"), another well-known big game hunter and explorer. The plot twists and turns (and thickens) but Cyril wins Amelia in the end, thanks to a wandering copy of the new Inspector Mould mystery, Strychnine in the Soup.

== Publication history ==
In The American Magazine, the story was illustrated by Roy F. Spreter. It was illustrated by Treyer Evans in the Strand. The story was published in Ellery Queen's Mystery Magazine in February 1952.

"Strychnine in the Soup" was collected in the Mulliner Omnibus, published in 1935 by Herbert Jenkins Limited, and in The World of Mr. Mulliner, published in the UK in 1972 by Barrie & Jenkins and issued in the US in 1974 by the Taplinger Publishing Company. It was included in the 1939 collection The Week-End Wodehouse (US edition), published by Doubleday, Doran & Co. The story was featured in the 1949 collection The Best of Wodehouse, with stories selected by Scott Meredith and published by Pocket Books, New York. The collection generally included one story from each series, and "Strychnine in the Soup" was the only Mulliner story. The story was collected in the 1960 book The Most of P. G. Wodehouse, published in October 1960 by Simon and Schuster, New York. It was also included in Wodehouse on Crime, edited by D. R. Bensen and published by Ticknor & Fields, New York, in 1981.

The story was included in the anthology Treasury of Great Humor, Including Wit, Whimsy, and Satire from the Remote Past to the Present, edited and with commentary by Louis Untermeyer, and published by McGraw-Hill, New York, in 1972.

== Adaptations ==
A BBC TV adaptation of the story aired on 9 April 1976 as part of the Wodehouse Playhouse series.

== See also ==
- List of Wodehouse's Mr Mulliner stories
