= Best Seller (short story) =

1930 short story by P. G. Wodehouse

- Short story by P. G. Wodehouse
- Language: English
- Genre: Comedy

Publication
- Publisher: Cosmopolitan (US); Strand (UK)
- Media type: Print (Magazine)
- Publication date: June 1930 (US); July 1930 (UK)

"Best Seller" is a short story by the British comic writer P. G. Wodehouse. A part of the Mr. Mulliner series, the story was first published in the US in Cosmopolitan in June 1930, and in the UK in The Strand Magazine in July 1930. The Cosmopolitan version of the story does not include Mr Mulliner. The Mulliner version of the story was included in the collection Mulliner Nights (1933).

"Best Seller" was rewritten from an earlier story, "Parted Ways", which was published in the US in the Strand in December 1901, and in the UK in Pictorial Review in June 1947.

== Plot ==
Egbert Mulliner, a literary critic, falls in love with Evangeline Pembury while recovering from an overdose of interviewing female novelists. After ensuring that she doesn't secretly write novels or short stories, he confesses his love to her and she reciprocates. Love, however, makes Evangeline write a romantic novel 'Parted Ways' which ends up becoming a best seller. A literary agent arrives, Egbert finds himself cut off from his love, and the couple 'part ways'. A change comes over Egbert and, whenever a female novelist has to be interviewed, Egbert boldly goes. Thus, he finds himself interviewing Evangeline for an article for his paper. Evangeline breaks down, confesses that she has committed to writing three novels and several short stories but cannot write another word, and Egbert steps into the breach with novels that he had written when but a struggling young man.

== Publication history ==
"Best Seller" was illustrated by James Montgomery Flagg in Cosmopolitan. It was illustrated by Charles Crombie in the Strand. The original story "Parted Ways" was illustrated by Alfred Leete in the Strand, and by Walter Tittle in Pictorial Review.

It was collected in the Mulliner Omnibus, published in 1935 by Herbert Jenkins Limited, and in The World of Mr. Mulliner, published in the UK in 1972 by Barrie & Jenkins and issued in the US in 1974 by the Taplinger Publishing Company. It was also included in the 1939 collection The Week-End Wodehouse (US edition), published by Doubleday, Doran & Co.

The 1962 anthology Enjoy These Stories! Fourth Selection, included "Best Seller". The anthology was edited by Cedric Austin, illustrated by Brian Wildsmith, and published by Ginn, London.

== See also ==
- List of Wodehouse's Mr Mulliner stories
