= The Smile That Wins =

1931 short story by P. G. Wodehouse

- Short story by P. G. Wodehouse
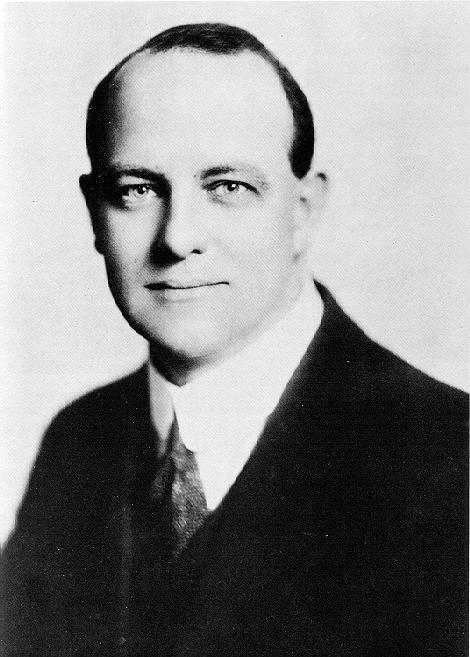
- Portrait of British comic author P. G. Wodehouse
- Country: United Kingdom
- Language: English
- Genre: Comedy

Publication
- Publisher: American Magazine (US); Strand (UK)
- Media type: Print (Magazine)
- Publication date: October 1931 (US); February 1932 (UK)

"The Smile That Wins" is a short story by the British comic writer P. G. Wodehouse. A part of the Mr. Mulliner series, the story was first published in the United States, in the October 1931 issue of The American Magazine. It was subsequently published in the United Kingdom in the February 1932 issue of The Strand Magazine. It was collected in Mulliner Nights (1933).

The story features Adrian Mulliner, who also appears in a short story that is not narrated by Mr Mulliner, "From a Detective's Notebook" (1959).

== Plot ==
Adrian Mulliner, a private detective, falls in love with Lady Millicent Shipton-Bellinger, the daughter of the fifth Earl of Brangbolton who has a horror of detectives ever since Millicent's Uncle Joe's troubles in 1928. The father insists that Millicent must marry Sir Jasper Addleton, the financier.

Heartbroken, Adrian has a bad attack of dyspepsia (he suffers from the disease and it was the melancholic dyspeptic look that first attracted Millicent) and a doctor advises him that the best cure for dyspepsia is to smile. Adrian, who hasn't smiled since he was twelve ("I saw the butler trip on a spaniel and upset the melted butter all over Aunt Elizabeth"), has a sinister-looking smile that seems to say 'I know all' and causes a great deal of nervousness amongst people with something to hide.

A kleptomaniac Baronet helping himself to a fish slice at a wedding is his first victim and Adrian finds himself invited to the Baronet's country home where he finds Lord Brangbolton in residence. After he solves the case of the missing soap (it had shot out of the Earl's hands while he was singing "Sonny Boy") he unleashes his smile on Sir Jasper Addleton who, guilty like all financiers, hands him a cheque for a hundred thousand pounds.

With this hundred thousand pounds in hand, and the unfortunate effect of the smile on the Earl just as the Earl was cheating at cards, Adrian gets the Earl's blessing to marry Millicent.

== Publication history ==
In The American Magazine, the story was illustrated by Roy F. Spreter. It was illustrated by Treyer Evans in The Strand Magazine. The story was published in Ellery Queen's Mystery Magazine (US) in June 1952, under the title "Adrian Mulliner, Detective". It was published in The Saint Detective Magazine (US) in September 1954, as "Mr. Mulliner Private Detective".

The story was collected in the Mulliner Omnibus, published in 1935 by Herbert Jenkins Limited. Under the title "The Smile that Wins", it was included in The World of Mr. Mulliner, published in the UK in 1972 by Barrie & Jenkins and issued in the US by the Taplinger Publishing Company in 1974. It was included in The Week-End Wodehouse (US edition), published in January 1939 by Doubleday, Doran & Co. It was also included in the US collections The Most of P. G. Wodehouse, published in 1960 by Simon and Schuster, and Wodehouse on Crime, published in 1981 by Ticknor & Fields.

"The Smile That Wins" was included in the 1934 anthology Panorama of Modern Literature, Contributed by 31 Great Modern Writers, published by Doubleday with an introduction by Christopher Morley.

== Adaptations ==
An episode of Wodehouse Playhouse, titled "The Smile That Wins", was adapted from the story. The episode first aired on 31 October 1978.

The story was adapted for radio in 2002 under the title "The Smile that Wins", as part of a series with Richard Griffiths as Mr Mulliner. The cast also included Matilda Ziegler as Miss Postlethwaite and Millicent, Peter Acre as a Port, the specialist, and Sir Jasper, David Timson as a Pint of Stout and Lord Brangbolton, and Carl Prekopp as a Small Bitter and Adrian. The episode first aired on 13 May 2002 on BBC Radio 4.

== See also ==
- List of Wodehouse's Mr Mulliner stories
