= Wodehouse Playhouse =

British TV comedy series (1974–1978)

- Title card for the first two series of Wodehouse Playhouse
- Genre: Comedy; Romance
- Based on: P. G. Wodehouse's short stories
- Written by: David Climie
- Starring: John Alderton; Pauline Collins
- Country of origin: United Kingdom
- Original language: English
- No. of series: 3
- No. of episodes: 20 (and 1 pilot)

Production
- Producers: David Askey; Michael Mills; Gareth Gwenlan
- Production locations: England, United Kingdom
- Running time: 30 minutes

Original release
- Network: BBC1 and BBC2
- Release: 9 July 1974 – 12 December 1978

Wodehouse Playhouse is a British television comedy series based on the short stories of P. G. Wodehouse. From 1974 to 1978, a pilot and three series were made, with 21 half-hour episodes altogether in the entire series. The series has been released on home video.

== Production ==
P. G. Wodehouse introduced the episodes in the first series. These introductions were filmed in January 1975, shortly before his death.

The pilot episode aired in the anthology series Comedy Playhouse. The first and second series of Wodehouse Playhouse initially aired on BBC1. Reruns of these episodes aired on BBC2 in 1977, and the third series first aired on BBC2. The episodes were broadcast in the US on PBS television stations. In 2003, the series was released on home video.

David Climie adapted all the episodes, including the pilot. The first series was produced by David Askey, the second series was produced by Michael Mills, and the third series was produced by Gareth Gwenlan.

With the exception of the pilot, John Alderton featured in all episodes, and his wife Pauline Collins was in all of the episodes in the first and second series. Geraldine Newman was featured in the first series. Sally Thomsett and Liza Goddard were among the actresses who were featured during the third series.

As each episode is a stand-alone adaptation of a different short story, Alderton and Collins play different parts in each show in which they appear. While they are often romantically linked, there are several episodes where each pairs up with a different character. Most of the stories are culled from the Mr. Mulliner stories. The series also includes episodes based on some of the Oldest Member golf stories, and some of the stories that revolve around the Drones Club.

== Episodes ==
=== Pilot (1974) ===
Title	Adapted from	Original release date
"The Reverent Wooing of Archibald"	"The Reverent Wooing of Archibald" (Mr Mulliner story).	9 June 1974
This episode is believed to be lost. It aired in the anthology series Comedy Playhouse, almost a year before the first Wodehouse Playhouse series. Cast: William Mervyn as Mr Mulliner, Betty Romaine as Miss Postlethwaite, Julian Holloway as Archibald Mulliner, Madeline Smith as Aurelia Cammerleigh, Julian Fox as Algy Wymondham-Wymondham, Joan Benham as Aunt Cora and John Leeson as Tuppy Glossop.

=== Series 1 (1975) ===
No. overall	No. in series	Title	Adapted from	Original release date
1	1	"The Truth About George"	"The Truth About George" (Mr Mulliner story).	23 April 1975
George Mulliner's terrible stammer prevents him from proposing to his neighbour, Susan Blake. A London specialist advises George to speak to three total strangers each day, singing the words if necessary. This leads George into some embarrassing encounters with fellow train passengers, including 'The Emperor of Abyssinia', an escapee from a mental asylum. But his stammer does vanish and he declares his love to Susan. Cast: John Alderton as George Mulliner, Pauline Collins as Susan Blake, Anna Wing as Mrs Barnaby, Anthony Sharp as the specialist, Patrick Newell as fierce man and Colin Jeavons as stranger.
2	2	"Romance at Droitgate Spa"	"Romance at Droitgate Spa".	30 April 1975
Freddie Fitch-Fitch wants to marry Annabelle Purvis (aka Princess Alura), assistant to conjuror Mortimer Rackstraw (aka The Great Boloni), but his uncle Sir Aylmer Bastable would not release his trust fund. When Sir Aylmer, a hypochondriac, learns that Annabelle's uncle Joe Boffin (Leslie Dwyer) is also a famous hypochondriac and has even been written up in medical journals, he relents. Cast: John Alderton as Mortimer Rackstraw, Pauline Collins as Annabel Purvis, Julian Holloway as Freddie Fitch-Fitch, Raymond Huntley as Sir Aylmer Bastable, Mark Dignam as Lord Rumblelow, Graham Armitage as Parkin, Leslie Dwyer as Joe Boffin.
3	3	"Portrait of a Disciplinarian"	"Portrait of a Disciplinarian" (Mr Mulliner story).	7 May 1975
Reginald Mulliner is induced by his brother to take afternoon tea with his childhood nanny (Daphne Heard), now retired. But she has lost none of her ability to frighten him. However, she has also invited Jane Oliphant, his ex-fiancée. Locked together in a cupboard, they make up their differences. Cast: John Alderton as Reginald Mulliner, Pauline Collins as Jane Oliphant, William Gaunt as Dr. Joe Mulliner and Daphne Heard as Nanny Wilks.
4	4	"Unpleasantness at Bludleigh Court"	"Unpleasantness at Bludleigh Court" (Mr Mulliner story).	14 May 1975
Aubrey Bassinger, who writes 'Pastels in Prose' meets Charlotte Mulliner who writes 'Vingettes in Verse'. They fall in love. They visit his ancestral home, Bludleigh Court, but Aubrey's father and the rest of the hunting-mad family cast a malevolent spell on the couple. They find themselves also turning into bloodthirsty hunters and can only recover by escaping to London and marrying. Cast: John Alderton as Aubrey Bassinger, Pauline Collins as Charlotte Mulliner, Ballard Berkeley as Sir Alexander, John Sharp as Colonel Pashley-Drake, Shelagh Fraser as Lady Bassinger and David Allister as Horatio Bassinger.
5	5	"The Rise of Minna Nordstrom"	"The Rise of Minna Nordstrom" (Mr Mulliner story).	21 May 1975
In 1920s Hollywood, everyone wants to get into films, including Vera Prebble, a parlour maid. She is fired in succession by producers Jacob Schnellenhammer, Isadore Q Fishbein, and Ben Zizzbaum. In revenge, she blackmails them by threatening to tell the police that they are storing and drinking alcohol on their premises during Prohibition. They buy her off by making her a silent film star under the name of Minna Nordstrom. Cast: John Alderton as Jacob J. Schnellenhamer, Pauline Collins as Minna Nordstrom, Sydney Tafler as Isadore Q. Fishbein, Peter Jones as Ben F. Zizzbaum and Barbara Bermel as Mother.
6	6	"Rodney Fails to Qualify"	"Rodney Fails to Qualify" (Oldest Member golf story).	28 May 1975
William Bates and Jill Packard, both avid golfers, have loved each other for years, but William's too shy to propose. The Oldest Member at the golf club takes matters in hand, but then Jill falls for dreamy poetry-quoting Rodney Spelvin. Whilst Jill is playing in the Ladies Cup, he admits that he hates golf. She is so shocked that she and William finally get together. Cast: John Alderton as William Bates, Pauline Collins as Jill Packard, William Mervyn as the Oldest Member, Geoffrey Whitehead as Rodney Spelvin, Andrew Downie as Gerald McLaren and Josephine Tewson as Mabel Potts.
7	7	"A Voice From the Past"	"The Voice from the Past" (Mr Mulliner story).	4 June 1975
Muriel Branksome and Sacheverell Mulliner are engaged, but Mulliner cannot stand up to his fierce future father-in-law. He enrols in a correspondence course to gain Self-Confidence. Unfortunately, it works too well, turns him into an overpowering bully and the engagement is off. Mulliner tries to win Muriel back, but then meets his old Headmaster, now a bishop, who still frightens him. Cast: Pauline Collins as Muriel Branksome, John Alderton as Sacheverell Mulliner, John Phillips as Sir Redvers Branksome, Cyril Luckham as the Bishop of Bognor, Artro Morris as Mr. Philbrick and Phil Daniels as office boy.

=== Series 2 (1976) ===
No. overall	No. in series	Title	Adapted from	Original release date
8	1	"Anselm Gets His Chance"	"Anselm Gets His Chance" (Mr Mulliner story).	26 March 1976
Rev. Anselm Mulliner and Myrtle Jellaby want to marry, but cannot afford it on a curate's meagre stipend. Then Anselm inherits an allegedly valuable stamp album, but Myrtle's uncle Sir Leopold, realising its worth, offers him only ten pounds for it. When Rev. Gooch is indisposed, Anselm has the opportunity to give the evensong sermon of his life, on the subject of 'brotherly love'. Sir Leopold is so moved that he offers Anselm ten thousand pounds for the album. Cast: John Alderton as Rev. Anselm Mulliner, Pauline Collins as Myrtle Jellaby, Thorley Walters as Sir Leopold Jellaby, Desmond Llewelyn as Rev. Sidney Gooch and Paul Curran as Joe Beamish.
9	2	"Mr. Potter Takes a Rest Cure"	"Mr Potter Takes a Rest Cure" (Bobbie Wickham story).	2 April 1976
Long-winded politician Clifford Gandle wants to marry Bobbie Wickham. She is not keen, but Lady Wickham insists on the match. Bobbie, a mischief-maker, persuades visiting American publisher Mr Potter that Gandle is prone to attacks of homicidal mania. She also convinces Gandle that Mr Potter is contemplating suicide. In the ensuing chaos, the proposed match comes to nothing. Cast: John Alderton as Clifford Gandle, Pauline Collins as Bobbie Wickham, Alan MacNaughtan as J. H. Potter, Margaret Courtenay as Lady Wickham and Timothy Carlton as Algy Crufts.
10	3	"Strychnine in the Soup"	"Strychnine in the Soup" (Mr Mulliner story).	9 April 1976
Cyril Mulliner, an interior decorator with a passion for mystery stories, is in love with Amelia Bassett, a fellow devotee. Lady Bassett objects, preferring Lester Mapledurham ("pronounced 'Mum'"), a well-known big game hunter and explorer, as a son-in-law. Thanks to a copy of the new 'Inspector Mould' mystery, Strychnine in the Soup. Lester is scratched from the marriage race and Cyril wins Amelia. Cast: John Alderton as Cyril Mulliner, Pauline Collins as Amelia Bassett, Joan Sanderson as Lady Bassett and Ben Aris as Lester Mapledurham.
11	4	"Feet of Clay"	"Feet of Clay" (Oldest Member golf story).	23 April 1976
Sydney McMurdo and Agnes Flack, both avid golfers, are engaged, but her head is turned by dashing and boastful Captain Jack Fosdyke and she becomes engaged to him instead. Sydney, at a loose end, becomes engaged to Cora McGuffy Spottsworth, a flamboyant writer and mystic who believes that they knew each other in a previous life. Cora and Agnes compete in the Women's Championship. With one hole to go and all square, a Pekinese dog runs off with the ball Agnes is about to play. Jack urges Agnes to concede the match, Agnes is appalled at the suggestion and their engagement is off. Agnes and Sydney get together again, and Jack, now exposed as a fake, finds solace with Lulubelle Sprockett, an air-headed blonde American heiress. Cast: Pauline Collins as Agnes Flack, John Alderton as Jack Fosdyke, Simon Williams as Sidney McMurdo and Cyd Hayman as Cora McGuffy Spottsworth.
12	5	"The Nodder"	"The Nodder" and "Monkey Business" (both Mr Mulliner stories),	30 April 1976
Wilmot Mulliner is a lowly 'nodder' in a Hollywood studio whose sole job is to agree to the pronouncements of producer I Q Fishbein. Wilmot falls for Fishbein's secretary Mabel Ridgeway, but she would not marry him unless he proves himself worthy. After apparently bravely tackling a violent gorilla (actually an actor in disguise), he does proves worthy of Muriel's attention. Mabel, a former vaudeville birdcall-imitator, has a dispute with Fishbein over the proper manner of imitating a cuckoo for a film (cuckoo-cuckoo v wuckoo-wuckoo). Wilmot finds the courage to defy his boss and defend Mabel. Cast: John Alderton as Wilmot Mulliner, Pauline Collins as Mabel Ridgway, Sydney Tafler as I. Q. Fishbein, David Healy as L. O. Levitsky, Jonathan Cecil as King Boola, Don Fellows as George Pybus, Jay Neill as Yes Man and Bill Reimbold as clergyman.
13	6	"The Code of the Mulliners"	"The Code of the Mulliners" (Mr Mulliner story).	7 May 1976
Archibald Mulliner, whose sole claim to fame is that he can imitate a hen laying an egg, believes that his mother is developing insanity. Thinking that insanity can be inherited, he decides to break his engagement to Aurelia Cammerleigh, but the Code of the Mulliners will not allow him to take this step. On Tuppy Glossop's advice, he hires an actress, Yvonne Maltravers, to confront the couple at the Savoy Grill in the role of a Woman from his Past. In the midst of the scene, Lady Mulliner turns up, revealing that her odd behaviour is really a cure for a double chin. She also recognises Yvonne. Archibald quickly concocts the story that Yvonne is seeking his assistance to land a part for producer Charles B. Cochran. Cast: John Alderton as Archibald Mulliner, Pauline Collins as Yvonne Maltravers, Gabrielle Drake as Aurelia Cammerleigh, Walter Gotell as Sir Rackstraw Cammerleigh, David Quilter as Tuppy Glossop, Daphne Oxenford as Lady Cammerleigh and Kenneth Benda as Bagshot.

=== Series 3 (1978) ===
No. overall	No. in series	Title	Adapted from	Original release date
14	1	"The Smile That Wins"	"The Smile that Wins" (Mr Mulliner story).	31 October 1978
In the course of returning a lost dog, Adrian Mulliner, a private detective, falls in love with Lady Millicent Shipton-Bellinger, the daughter of the Earl of Brangbolton. His lowly social status and equally lowly financial status does not allow them to marry, and the Earl insists that Millicent must marry Sir Jasper Addleton, the financier. Adrian regularly suffers from dyspepsia, and a doctor advises him that the best cure for dyspepsia is to smile (which he hasn't attempted since the age of twelve). At a wedding reception, where Adrian is assigned to keep an eye on potentially thieving guests, his odd smile is interpreted as saying 'I know all', and causes a nervousness amongst people with something to hide. A guest helping himself to a fish slice is his first victim and Adrian finds himself invited to the Baronet's country home. The next guilty party is Addleton who, believing that Mulliner knows of his dirty dealings, hands him a cheque for a hundred thousand pounds and agrees to leave the country. Adrian gets the Earl's blessing to marry Millicent. Cast: John Alderton as Adrian Mulliner, Judy Buxton as Lady Millicent Shipton-Bellinger, Robert Dorning as Lord Brangbolton, Anthony Howard as Sir Sutton Hartley-Wesping, Arthur Cox as Sir Jasper Addleton, Anthony Sharp as the specialist, Fulton Mackay as Mr. Widgery, Michael Bilton as Malay, Hugh Morton as the Bishop and David Rowlands as Lord Knubble.
15	2	"Trouble down at Tudsleigh"	"Trouble Down at Tudsleigh" (Drones Club story).	7 November 1978
Visiting Tudsleigh Court, Freddie Widgeon falls in love with April Carroway. He even starts reading Tennyson's poetry, which she admires – especially "The Lady of Shalott". Captain Bradbury, on leave from India, also admires April, and makes it clear what will happen if Freddie doesn't clear out. Nevertheless, Freddie invites April for a row on the river. She fails to turn up and he's stuck with her prankish young sister Prudence instead. Prudence vanishes and appears to have drowned in the river. In an attempt to find her, Freddie plunges into the river to find her, steals a car, breaks into Bradbury's cottage, and gets the heave-ho from April for his trouble. Cast: John Alderton as Freddie Widgeon, Anna Fox as April Carroway, Tony Mathews as Captain Bradbury, Bernadette Windsor as Prudence Carroway and Nicholas McArdle as Ted.
16	3	"Tangled Hearts"	"Tangled Hearts" (Oldest Member golf story).	14 November 1978
Smallwood Bessemer, an indefatigable know-it-all and golf club bore (although he doesn't actually play golf), and Carter Muldoon, are both dumped by their fiancées. The Oldest Member tries fruitlessly to reconcile them, and the two men eventually become engaged to their opposite former girls. Bessemer learns to play golf (as he thinks) and the two couples play a match. It's a disaster, and the original couples get back together. Cast: John Alderton as Smallwood Bessemer, Richard Caldicot as Angus McWhirter, David Troughton as Carter Muldoon, Sue Nicholls as Esme Rampling, Sally Thomsett as Celia Todd and Laura Collins as Julia Prebble.
17	4	"The Luck of the Stiffhams"	"The Luck of the Stiffhams" (Drones Club story).	21 November 1978
Adolphus (Stiffy) Stiffham, secretary to the Earl of Wivelscombe, wants to marry his daughter Lady Geraldine Spettisbury, but is dismissed for his trouble. He leaves for America (not knowing that the Wall Street crash has just occurred), hoping to make his fortune. At his hotel, the bellboy gets him involved in an illegal craps game. Innocently betting against a hardened crew of players, he makes $120,000, and banks it. Next day, thinking that the bank has gone bust, he writes a suicide note to Geraldine, but then learns that the money is safe. He returns home to claim Geraldine. She still loves him, but the Earl thinks that he really has committed suicide, and what he sees is really Stiffy's ghost. The Earl is thoroughly frightened that he will be haunted. With the connivance of the butler, the Earl gives his consent to the marriage. Cast: John Alderton as Adolphus "Stiffy" Stiffham, Leslie Sands as the Earl of Wivelscome, Liza Goddard as Lady Geraldine Spettisbury, David Healy as Raymond Bunion and John Rudling as the butler.
18	5	"The Editor Regrets"	"The Editor Regrets" (Drones Club story).	28 November 1978
Bingo Little, now married to Rosie M Banks, is editor of the magazine 'Wee Tots' owned by Mr Purkis. He loses his job when he inadvertently gives the air to visiting American author of children's stories, Bella Mae Jobson, who was about to sign a contract with Purkis. Meeting Bella later at a party, he enlists Tuppy Glossop's assistance (and money), to 'give her the old oil'. Bella eventually agrees to a contract with the magazine. Bingo extricates Purkis from a potentially compromising situation, and gets his job back. Cast: John Alderton as Bingo Little, Susan Jameson as Bella Mae Jobson, Bernard Archard as Purkiss, David Quilter as Tuppy Glossop, Jane Cussons as Rosie Little and William Hayland as Stilton Cheesewright.
19	6	"Big Business"	"Big Business" (Mr Mulliner story).	5 December 1978
Reginald Mulliner and Amanda Biffen want to marry, and when Mulliner inherits £50,000, it seems the ideal opportunity. Mulliner is induced to use the money to buy a block of worthless oil shares (Smelly River Ordinaries) by Amanda's rascally guardian, Sir Jethro Mott, and Amanda 'gives him the raspberry'. Mulliner is due to perform 'Ol' Man River' that night at a church social, and with no fiancée and no money, his emotions take over and he gives it all he's got, to great applause. Thus encouraged, he goes back to have it out with Sir Jethro. Amanda, who was in the audience, also comes back to apologise to Mulliner. With the assistance of a not-too-bright policeman, they get Sir Jethro to buy back the shares, with a profit to Mulliner. Cast: John Alderton as Reginald Mulliner, Maggie Henderson as Amanda Biffen, Derek Francis as Sir Jethro Mott, Damaris Hayman as Miss Frisby, Norman Mitchell as P. C. Popjoy and David Rowlands as Lord Knubble.
20	7	"Mulliner's Buck-U-Uppo"	"Mulliner's Buck-U-Uppo" (Mr Mulliner story).	12 December 1978
Rev. Augustine Mulliner, a meek young curate, is in love with Jane Brandon, but they are opposed by her father, the vicar. Augustine's Aunt Agatha sends him a bottle of a tonic, Buck-U-Uppo, which her husband is developing. Mulliner takes a tablespoonful. He immediately acquires more confidence and assertiveness as well as greater physical strength. Thus fortified, he rescues a visiting bishop from a fierce dog, and firmly ends a quarrel between the bishop and the vicar, who have hated each other since school. He receives the vicar's thanks and a promotion to vicar in a nearby parish. But then Mulliner learns that the tonic he drank was not the one meant for human consumption – it's really meant for increasing the courage of elephants in India. Augustine promptly orders three cases of the tonic. Cast: John Alderton as Augustine Mulliner, Cyril Luckham as the Bishop, John Barron as Rev. Stanley Brandon, Avis Bunnage as Mrs Wardle, Belinda Carroll as Jane Brandon and Beatrix Mackey as the Lady Bishopess.

== Reception ==
In his book P. G. Wodehouse and Hollywood: Screenwriting, Satires and Adaptations, Brian Taves considered that the first series of Wodehouse Playhouse as a whole did not convey the sophisticated wit of Wodehouse's stories, while sometimes capturing other elements such as their slapstick humour. Taves thought that the quality of the series significantly improved in the second series, with episodes, especially "Strychnine in the Soup", effectively conveying Wodehouse's satire of different genres and character types. Taves believed this improvement was largely due to the second series producer Michael Mills, who had experience from his involvement with the earlier Wodehouse television programmes The World of Wooster and The World of Wodehouse. According to Taves, the third series, produced by Gareth Gwenlan, generally maintained the high quality of the second series, with "The Editor Regrets" in particular being ideally adapted.

Taves compared Wodehouse Playhouse to the 1924 Stoll Pictures short film series The Clicking of Cuthbert, adapted from Wodehouse's golf stories. Both series have episode running times of about half an hour, which Taves found to be the ideal length for capturing a short story on screen without overly condensing or stretching the story. Taves also thought that both series attempted to balance the humour of the source material with additional slapstick scenes intended to make the stories more humorous on screen. However, Taves believed that these additions sometimes interrupted the pacing in both series. A significant difference between the two series is that Wodehouse Playhouse greatly benefited from the actors' inflection of the dialogue, which was limited to intertitles in the 1924 silent films.
