= Martin Hyder =

English actor

- Occupations: Actor, writer

Martin Hyder is a British actor and writer.

== Profile ==
Hyder was educated at Abingdon School and The University of Kent He has worked closely with the BBC since 2000 contributing and appearing in BBC Radio and BBC Television. His television credits include The Lenny Henry Show, The Omid Djalili Show, Ruddy Hell! It’s Harry and Paul, Harry Hill's TV Burp and he has appeared on many successful BBC radio shows.

In addition he has appeared on stage and in film, most recently he had a role in the 2014 film Edge of Tomorrow, and performed on stage in the plays Dead Dog in a Suitcase in 2015 and My Brilliant Friend at the Rose Theatre, Kingston in 2017.

== Selected television and film ==
- Bergerac
- Industry
- Edge of Tomorrow
- The Harry Hill Movie
- Harry Hill's TV Burp
- The Omid Djalili Show
- Ruddy Hell! It’s Harry and Paul
- The Lenny Henry Show
- The Secret Show
- Doctors and Nurses
- Big Train
- 15 Storeys High
- The 11 O'Clock Show
- How Do You Want Me?
- True Love and Wormholes

== Selected radio ==
- The Hudson and Pepperdine Show
- Linda Smith's A Brief History of Timewasting
- The Sunday Format
- The Mark Steel Lectures
- Harry Hill's Fruit Corner
- Clare in the Community
- Ed Reardon's Week
- Life, Death and Sex with Mike and Sue

== See also ==
- List of Old Abingdonians
