= Wallace Morgan =

American artist (1875–1948)

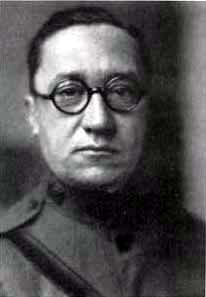
Wallace Morgan circa 1918

Wallace Morgan (1875 – April 24, 1948) was a war artist for the United States Army during World War I.

== Biography ==
Morgan was born in 1875, and he grew up in Albany, New York, where his family had moved shortly after his birth. Upon graduation from high school, he returned to his birthplace, New York City, to pursue a career in art. He studied at the National Academy of Design while working at the New York Sun as a part-time artist.

In 1898, he joined the staff of the New York Herald and became a full-time newspaper artist covering whatever assignments came his way, including a 1902 trip to Martinique to cover the eruptions of Mt. Pele. During this period, he developed the ability to render a faithful picture of nature with little need for preliminary sketches, an essential skill for a newspaper illustrator who had to convey to readers the image of an event quickly and accurately.

After eleven years with the Herald, he opened his own studio. Shortly thereafter, Collier's commissioned him and Julian Bond to tour the United States and report their findings in words and pictures. Two trips across the country each produced a book that presented a light view of life in America. World War I and Morgan's selection as an AEF artist brought an early end to a third trip. Morgan put his ability to sketch quickly to good use during the war. His work projects an air of activity and movement into scenes of combat. A number of his pictures also reflect his apparent interest in the many columns of troops, animals, and equipment that moved ceaselessly across the battlefields of France. After the war, Morgan returned to work in his studio in New York City.

Morgan was president of the Society of Illustrators from 1929 to 1936. In 1945, he made a comic strip adaptation of Margery Sharp's novel Cluny Brown. He died at home of a heart attack on April 24, 1948. He was survived by his sister Elizabeth G. Morgan, who had the same address.

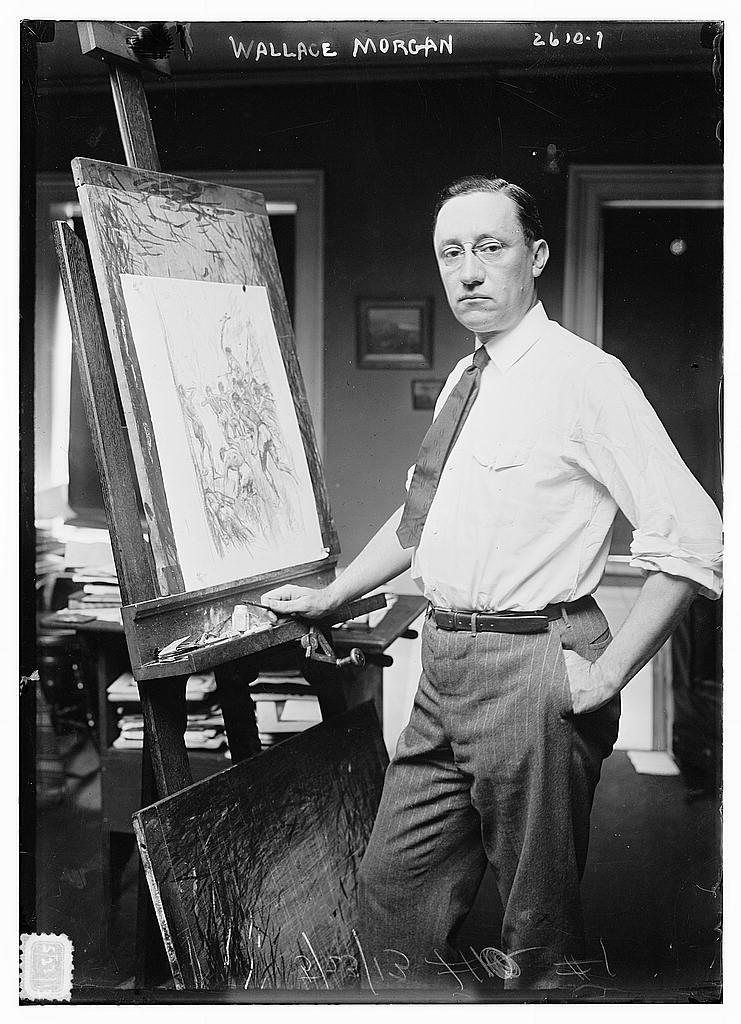
Morgan on May 23, 1913 at his studio
