= Charles Exeter Devereux Crombie =

British cartoonist and artist (1885–1967)

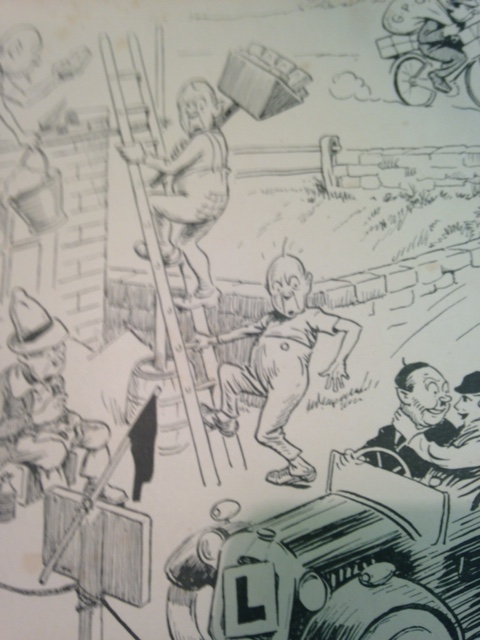
Detail of Endpapers

Charles Exeter Devereux Crombie (30 April 1880 – 1967) was an editorial cartoonist.

Crombie was the third son of Scots architect James Crombie and his wife Bridget Philadelphia Vince. Born at Dumfries, Scotland, Charles grew up in the 1880s and 1890s in Lambeth, Surrey, his father being partner in the London architectural practice Byrne & Crombie. By 1901 Charles Crombie was working as a sculptor and artist, from his family home at 25 Rumsey Road, Lambeth.

Charles Crombie specialised in cartoons and publication illustrations. His collection of humorous postcard cartoons "The Rules of Golf" was published by Perrier in 1906, and rapidly became a best-selling series. Other similar sporting themes (including "The Rules of Cricket") followed with equal commercial success.

He married Helena Wallace (of Wadhurst, Sussex) in Lambeth in 1907, and by 1911 the couple were living at Hogarth House, Richmond Upon Thames, Surrey. Their daughter Irene Crombie was born there in 1914.

In 1915, part of Hogarth House was sold to leading Bloomsbury Set socialites Leonard and Virginia Woolf, who named their hobby business the Hogarth Press after the building.

Charles Crombie continued to produce illustrations for books and magazines in the UK and US throughout the 1920s and 1930s, including the Dodd Mead edition of W. M. Thackeray's Vanity Fair (New York City, 1924). He illustrated 11 of P. G. Wodehouse's Jeeves short stories published in The Strand Magazine between 1926 and 1930.

Charles Crombie died in Hitchin, Hertfordshire aged 86 in 1967.
