= A Prefect's Uncle =

1903 novel by P. G. Wodehouse

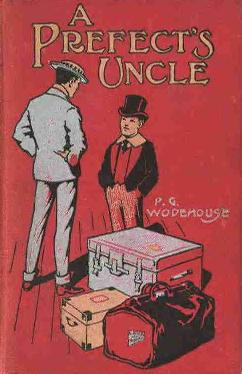
- First edition
- Author: P. G. Wodehouse
- Language: English
- Genre: Comedy novel
- Publisher: A & C Black
- Publication date: 11 September 1903
- Publication place: United Kingdom
- Media type: Print (hardback & paperback)
- OCLC: 5919911

A Prefect's Uncle is an early novel by author P. G. Wodehouse, one of his school stories for children. It was first published on 11 September 1903 by A & C Black. An American edition was issued by Macmillan from imported sheets in October 1903.

The action of the novel takes place at the fictional public school Beckford College, a boarding school for boys.

The title alludes to the arrival at the school of a mischievous young boy called Reginald Farnie, who turns out to be the uncle of the older "Bishop" Gethryn, a prefect, cricketer and popular figure in the school. His arrival, along with that of another youngster, Wilson, who becomes a personal servant to Gethryn's friend Marriott, leads to much excitement and scandal in the school, and the disruption of some important cricket matches.

== Plot ==
Gethryn is the Head-prefect of Leicester's House in Beckford and is friends with Marriott, another prefect. Marriott's aunt has asked him to look after the son of a friend, though the new boy, Wilson, proves to be capable of defending himself. Wilson becomes Marriott's fag (a junior student who performs errands for a senior student). Gethryn's aunt asked him to meet his uncle at the train station. Gethryn is surprised that his uncle, Farnie, is four years younger than him. Farnie is entering the school, having transferred between several schools, in each case because he was expelled or his father was dissatisfied with the school. The students in the Upper Fifth form are required to enter a poetry contest, and this year, the subject is the death of Dido. Lorimer, who is in the Upper Fifth, cannot write poetry, so his friend Pringle offers to write the poem for him. Against school rules, Farnie goes to a village to play billiards, and loses money. He borrows two pounds from Monk, a notorious troublemaker, who tells Farnie to pay him back four pounds later.

Monk is disappointed when Farnie does not become one of his cronies, and demands his loan get repaid or he will reveal that Farnie broke bounds to play billiards. While Gethryn is playing for Beckford against the Marylebone Cricket Club, Farnie takes four pounds out of Gethryn's charity collection box and leaves the money in Monk's study. Since Wilson sees Farnie in Gethryn's study and will probably realize later who took the money, Farnie decides to run away. He leaves a note for Gethryn and thinks he might as well take the other six pounds in the box too. The match against the M.C.C. starts well for Beckford, who bat first. During the lunch break, Gethryn sees Farnie's note. Gethryn believes he can catch up to Farnie on his bicycle and bring him back before the next innings. However, the match takes a bad turn for Beckford and the first innings soon ends. Since Gethryn cannot be found, Lorimer is brought in as a substitute fielder, but is not allowed to bowl. The team loses without Gethryn. Gethryn meanwhile encounters obstacles but finally brings back Farnie, who can only return six pounds. To protect his uncle, Gethryn refuses to explain why he left. Norris, the cricket captain, bars Gethryn from playing for the school team.

Pringle visits Colonel Ashby, a family friend. The Colonel shows him a book of poems containing a poem about the death of Dido. Pringle copies the poem and gives it to Lorimer, pretending he wrote it. Monk and his mob dislike Gethryn because Gethryn stopped them from bullying Wilson. Eight of them are in the cricket team for Leicester's and they refuse to play in the inter-house cricket cup unless Gethryn resigns his captaincy of the house team, but Marriott and Reece advise Gethryn to get junior House members to play instead, including Wilson. Marriott suggests Gethryn focusing on improving their fielding, since Gethryn, Reece and Marriott can handle the batting and bowling. On the day Jephson's plays against Leicester's, Norris, who is in Jephson's, underestimates Leicester's and misses the match. After Leicester's wins, Norris realizes he acted much like Gethryn did with the M.C.C. match. He reinstates Gethryn in the school team, but is still unhappy that Gethryn will not explain his actions.

Mr Wells, a friend of the Headmaster, selects Lorimer's poem as the prize winner. Mr Lawrie, the master of the Sixth, recognizes the poem as his own. The Headmaster questions Lorimer about this, and Lorimer then talks to Pringle, who reveals he copied the poem. They confess to the Headmaster. The Headmaster gives them a light punishment of two extra lessons, though this prevents them from playing in the cup for the School House. Leicester's defeats the School House and wins the cup. The winter term starts and the cricket season is over, but Leicester's has been united by their cricket cup victory and Monk leaving the school. Farnie has also been taken out of the school by his father, but repaid the four pounds to Gethryn. Gethryn feels he can now tell Reece and Marriott what happened the day of the M.C.C. match. Wilson hears Gethryn's story, and decides he should tell Norris. In a rugby match, Norris passes the ball to Gethryn, allowing him to make a dramatic score. He explains that Wilson told him the story and all is well between them again.

== Characters ==
Students at Beckford:

- Alan Gethryn, nicknamed "the Bishop", the Head-prefect of Mr Leicester's House in the Sixth form, member of the First Eleven and First Fifteen, also appears in "Personally Conducted"
- Marriott, a prefect of Leicester's and Gethryn's friend who shares a study with him
- Reginald Farnie, Gethryn's supercilious uncle who is four years his junior, member of Leicester's House and the Upper Fourth form
- Percy V. Wilson, Marriott's reliable fag, member of Leicester's House and the Lower Fourth form
- Pringle, a member of the School House, the school cricket team and the Remove who enjoys disagreeing with others and giving people advice
- Lorimer, a prosaic student in the Upper Fifth form who shares a study with Pringle in the School House
- Reece, a member of Leicester's and the First Eleven who tends to be reminded of long stories
- Norris, the Head of Jephson's and Beckford cricket captain
- Jack Monk, a disreputable member of Leicester's in the Remove, often makes trouble along with his friends and acquaintances or "the Mob"

Beckford staff and other characters:

- The Rev. James Beckett, the Headmaster of Beckford and the housemaster of the School House
- Mr Jephson, a schoolmaster in charge of the school cricket and a housemaster (of Jephson's House)
- Mr Lawrie, the master of the Sixth form, who wrote a book of poetry under a pseudonym
- Mr Mortimer Wells, an old pupil of the Headmaster's and the judge in the poetry contest
- Colonel Ashby, a friend of Pringle's father

About the author: P.G Wodehouse was born on October 15, 1881, Guildford, Surrey, England and has died on February 14, 1975, Southampton, New York, U.S. Sir Pelham Grenville Wodehouse, KBE was an English author and one of the most widely read humorists of the 20th century. Wodehouse spent happy teenage years at Dulwich College, to which he remained devoted all his life. He wrote books from 1902- 1975. Many of his books are comedy or romantic comedy.

== Publication history ==
The novel is dedicated "To W. Townend". The first edition was published with eight page illustrations by R. Noel Pocock. The American edition was issued by Macmillan, New York, in October 1903, from imported sheets. An American edition was also issued by Macmillan in 1924 from imported sheets.

A Prefect's Uncle was included in The Pothunters and Other School Stories, a collection of Wodehouse's first three published book-length works. It was published in January 1986 by Penguin Books. The other works included in the book are The Pothunters and Tales of St. Austin's.

The novel was reprinted on 17 June 2004 by R A Kessinger Publishing.

The text was released under Project Gutenberg in 2004.
