= Plum Stones =

1993 collection of short stories by P. G. Wodehouse

- Author: P. G. Wodehouse
- Language: English
- Genre: Short stories
- Published: 1993 (omnibus edition); 1993–1995 (volumes)
- Publication place: United Kingdom

Plum Stones (subtitled The Hidden P. G. Wodehouse) is a set of 12 volumes of uncollected short stories by P. G. Wodehouse. All 25 stories were previously published in magazines, but not published in book form in the UK. The volumes were published posthumously between 1993 and 1995 in the UK by Galahad Books. The first two volumes were published in 1993, the following six in 1994, and last four in 1995.

Each volume is a short booklet, with commentary on the stories by Tony Ring. The stories were printed in a limited edition with the permission of the Trustees of the Wodehouse Estate. The first sixteen sets were issued as an omnibus edition, published in 1993.

== Volumes ==
=== Wodehouse, Detective Writer ===
First volume, 64 pages.

- "The Strange Disappearance of Mr Buxton-Smythe" (also published in the 1997 UK collection Tales of Wrykyn and Elsewhere)
  - UK: Public School Magazine, December 1901
- "The Adventure of the Split Infinitive" (also in Tales of Wrykyn and Elsewhere)
  - UK: Public School Magazine, March 1902
- "Death at the Excelsior" (also published in the 1976 US collection The Uncollected Wodehouse)
  - UK: Pearson's, December 1914 (as "The Education of Detective Oakes")
  - US: All-Story Cavalier Weekly, March 13, 1915 (longest of all versions, under the title "The Harmonica Mystery", also printed under that title in The Saint Detective Magazine, June 1955, and in May 1978 in Ellery Queen's Mystery Magazine, the source for this book)
- "Mr McGee's Big Day"
  - US: Ellery Queen's Mystery Magazine, November 1950

"Mr McGee's Big Day" was six pages long in Ellery Queen's Mystery Magazine. For comparison, another Wodehouse story, "Strychnine in the Soup", was fifteen pages long when published in Ellery Queen in 1952.

=== Unrepublished Reggie Pepper ===
Second volume, 76 pages. All three stories feature the early Wodehouse character Reggie Pepper.

- "Disentangling Old Percy"
  - US: Collier's, 30 March 1912 (as "Disentangling Old Duggie")
  - UK: Strand, August 1912 (source for this book)
- "Concealed Art"
  - UK: Strand, February 1915 (source for this book)
  - US: Pictorial Review, July 1915
- "The Test Case" (also in The Uncollected Wodehouse)
  - UK: Pearson's, December 1915
  - US: Illustrated Sunday Magazine, 12 December 1915 (source for this book)

=== Theatrical Stories ===
Third volume, 64 pages.

- "The Colour Line"
  - US: McClure's, March/April 1920 (as "The Golden Flaw")
  - UK: Grand, April 1920 (source for this book)

Under the title "The Golden Flaw", the story was published in McClure's with illustrations by Arthur William Brown.

- "Back to the Garage"
  - UK: Strand, July 1929 (source for this book)
  - US: Cosmopolitan, July 1929 (as "Franklin's Favorite Daughter")

"Franklin's Favorite Daughter" was illustrated by David Robinson in Cosmopolitan. In the Strand, "Back to the Garage" was illustrated by S. Abbey.

=== Keggs, the Butler ===
Fourth volume, 36 pages.

- "Love Me, Love My Dog"
  - US: Hampton's, July 1920 (as "The Watch Dog", also published in Home in August 1931 as "A Dog-Eared Romance" and Green Book in August 1933 as "The Watch Dog")
  - UK: Strand, August 1910 (as "Love Me, Love My Dog."; source for this book)

"Watch Dog" was illustrated by Phillips Ward in Hampton's Magazine. "Love Me, Love My Dog" was illustrated by Harry Rountree in the Strand.

=== First Impressions, Mature Reflections ===
Fifth volume, 52 pages.

- "A Job of Work"
  - UK: Strand, January 1913 (source for this book)
  - US: Collier's, 6 September 1913

The story was illustrated by E. H. Shepard in the Strand, and by John Sloan in Collier's.

- "Ways to Get a Gal" (contains plot elements previously used in "Ahead of Schedule", collected in The Man Upstairs)
  - US: Dream World, February 1957

The story was illustrated by "R. L. S." in Dream World, a Chicago-based magazine.

=== There But For the Grace of God Goes Baxter ===
Sixth volume, 28 pages.

- "Creatures of Impulse" (later rewritten as "The Crime Wave at Blandings")
  - UK: Strand, October 1914 (source for this book)
  - US: McClure's, October 1914

=== Self-Derivatives Par Excellence ===
Seventh volume, 60 pages.

- "Big Business" (later rewritten as a Mr Mulliner story)
  - US: Collier's, 13 December 1952
  - UK: Lilliput, March 1953 (source for this book)
- "Joy Bells for Barmy" (contains plot elements taken from "Dudley Is Back to Normal", and some reused in "The Right Approach" and Barmy in Wonderland)
  - UK: Carnival, November 1946 (as "A Wedding Has Been Arranged")
  - US: Cosmopolitan, October 1947 (source for this book)
- "The Right Approach" (contains plot elements taken from "Joy Bells for Barmy", later rewritten as a Mr Mulliner story)
  - UK: Lilliput, September 1958 (as a Mulliner story, collected in A Few Quick Ones)
  - US: Playboy, January 1959 (source for this book, substantially revised from 1958 version)

=== Bertie's Friends ===
Eighth volume, 44 pages. The first story features Bobbie Wickham and the second Bingo Little.

- "Dudley is Back to Normal" (contains plot elements reused in "Joy Bells for Barmy")
  - UK: Strand, July 1940
- "The Great Fat Uncle Contest" (also published as "Stylish Stouts")
  - US: Playboy, April 1965 (as "Stylist Stout")
  - UK: London Evening Standard, 24 December 1965 (source for this book)

=== "In That Shape, Rotten" ===
Ninth volume, 40 pages.

- "Reggie and the Greasy Bird"
  - US: The Saturday Evening Post, 28 November 1936 (source for this book, rewritten from "The Masked Troubadour")
  - UK: Strand, December 1936 (as "The Masked Troubadour")

=== Ethics and Eugenics ===
Tenth volume, 52 pages.

- "A Prisoner of War" (with a character that appears in The Coming of Bill)
  - UK: Strand, March 1915 (source for this book)
  - US: Illustrated Sunday Magazine, 13 February 1916

"A Prisoner of War" was illustrated by Alfred Leete in the Strand.

- "The Pro" (contains plot elements reused in "The Goal-Keeper and the Plutocrat" in The Man Upstairs)
  - UK: Pearson's, August 1906 (source for this book), and Novel Magazine in August 1907 as "The Pro."

The story was illustrated by W. Heath Robinson in Pearson's.

=== Wrykyn Havoc ===
Eleventh volume, 36 pages.

- "Jackson's Extra" (also in Tales of Wrykyn and Elsewhere)
  - UK: Royal, June 1904
- "The Deserter" (also in Tales of Wrykyn and Elsewhere)
  - UK: Royal, August 1905

=== First Drafts ===
Twelfth volume, 44 pages.

- "Reginald's Record Knock" (cricket story)
  - UK: Pearson's, July 1909
  - US: Collier's Weekly, 19 March 1910 (as "Archibald's Benefit", a similar golf story collected in The Man Upstairs)
- "Tom, Dick and Harry" (cricket story, also in The Uncollected Wodehouse)
  - UK: Grand, June 1905 (as "Tom, Dick—and Harry")
