= Tales of Wrykyn and Elsewhere =

1997 collection of short stories by P. G. Wodehouse

First edition

Tales of Wrykyn and Elsewhere is a collection of short stories by British writer P. G. Wodehouse, first published on 1 October 1997 by Porpoise Books, London, with illustrations by T. M. R. Whitwell. It contains previously uncollected work, most of the stories having first appeared in the schoolboy's magazines such as The Captain and Public School Magazine. It was reprinted by Penguin Random House under its Everyman's Library imprint in 2014.

Several of the stories had previously seen publication in the US in the collections The Uncollected Wodehouse (1976) and The Swoop! and Other Stories (1979).

Each of the stories involve students of a fictional public school. In the collection, the stories are grouped by school. The first twelve stories are set at Wrykyn, followed by two stories involving St Asterisk's, three St Austin's, four Locksley, two Beckford, one Eckleton, and one Sedleigh.

== Contents ==
=== "Jackson's Extra" ===
- Royal, June 1904

The story is subtitled, "The story of how Wrykyn beat Ripton at cricket".

Plot

An important cricket match is scheduled between the rival schools Wrykyn and Ripton, on the latter's ground. Jackson, of Mr Spence's house, is Wrykyn's best batsman. He gets bored in class and becomes disorderly. The tough schoolmaster Mr Dexter clearly intends to put him "in extra" (which means attending the "extra lesson" and spending two hours doing additional school work in a classroom). This would be on the day of the Ripton match, which Jackson would miss. O'Hara, of Dexter's, an Irish student and also a member of the cricket team, has experience dealing with his House-master and offers to help Jackson. Mr Dexter has not said anything to Jackson about his punishment, since Mr Dexter generally delays doing so to give false hope, and has it posted in a list the day before the extra lesson. O'Hara finds that Mr Dexter has written "Jackson" in the forthcoming list. O'Hara gets a half crown from Jackson for expenses. They go to Ripton, and Wrykyn wins, largely because of Jackson, who scores a century. Mr Dexter later discovers that Jackson missed the extra lesson and reports it, but the Headmaster saw Jackson in the extra lesson, specifically W. P. Jackson, of Dexter's. The young W. P. Jackson, a fourteen-year-old fag, claims O'Hara saw the list and told him he was in extra. The Headmaster decides that Mr Dexter has no case. W. P. Jackson later spends a half crown at the school shop.

=== "Homœopathic Treatment" ===
- Royal, August 1904
  - Boys' Life (US), April 1931

Plot

Liss, of the Upper Fourth form, and Buxton, of the Lower Fifth, share study eight in Appleby's at Wrykyn. One day, Buxton starts wearing a strong scent called Simpkins Idle Moments, in order to annoy his Form-master Mr Day, who had put him "in extra" for throwing paper. Buxton claims it is recommended by doctors, but Mr Day hates scent and orders Buxton not to wear it in the form room again. The next day, Buxton wears a different scent, Riggles's Rose of the Hills. Mr Day protests again, but Buxton continues wearing it with the excuse that it is for his health. Like Mr Day, Liss hates Buxton's scents. Liss visits Vickery, also a member of Appleby's and the Upper Fourth, who is recovering from influenza in the infirmary. Vickery has a small study to himself, and Liss asks him to trade studies, since Vickery will not be able to smell much so soon after his illness and will not be bothered by Buxton's perfume. Vickery agrees, because he will be able to borrow Buxton's valuable Medea translation. Buxton is startled when Vickery comes wearing an even stronger scent, which he says is for his health. Buxton asks Liss to trade places. Liss agrees, and Buxton lets him keep the Medea crib. Vickery assures Liss that he only wore scent because he thought it would be better for them to have the study together than to share with Buxton.

=== "The Reformation of Study Sixteen" ===
- Royal, November 1904
  - Radio Digest (US), June 1930

Plot

Bellwood and Davies, the occupants of study sixteen in Donaldson's, are lazy and have doctor's certificates to excuse them from exercise. This irritates Trevor, the head of Donaldson's and the captain of rugby. Trevor hopes Donaldson's will win the inter-house cup for the house second fifteens (the secondary rugby teams), and wants the heavy Bellwood and Davies to play as forwards. Another member of the house, Clowes, visits the study of the mild, spectacled Dixon, and learns that Davies and Bellwood have been bothering him. Dixon is too polite to do anything about it. Later, Bellwood amuses himself by throwing boots at Dixon's door. The doors open to reveal Trevor, who had heard about Dixon's predicament from Clowes and had traded studies with Dixon. Trevor scolds Bellwood and punishes him by caning him. Shortly afterward, Bellwood sees Davies and, pretending he does not know Trevor is there, tells him Dixon's door won't open. Davies breaks down the door, and is surprised to see Trevor, who then punishes Davies too. Bellwood and Davies decide to harass Dixon in Trevor's former study. They find the door unlocked and start throwing books at Dixon, until they realize Trevor is also there. Bellwood and Davies agree to get into training and play for the house team to escape further punishment. They are subdued after doing strenuous exercise and later play well for Donaldson's second fifteen.

=== "Ruthless Reginald" ===
- The Captain, April 1905 (Tales of Wrykyn No. 1)

Plot

Reginald Rankin, of Seymour's, is a vengeful and unpopular student. He is fagging for George Rigby, a prefect in the Sixth Form. Two troublemaking students throw Rankin over a partition wall and he lands on Rigby's table. Rigby mistakenly thinks Rankin did this on purpose and punishes Rankin by caning him. The two students confess to Rigby that they pushed Rankin over. He apologizes to Rankin. Rankin is not satisfied and waits for an opportunity to get his revenge. Some time later, Rigby's uncle and aunt are coming to visit and he tells Rankin to hide a crib (a translation for students) of the Agamemnon in his room, since his uncle would disapprove of Rigby using a crib. Rankin has an alliance with J. Mereweather Cooke, a day-boy (a student who does not live at the school). Cooke lives in the nearby town of Wrykyn. Rankin uses this alliance to acquire even more translations, and leaves them in Rigby's study. Rankin shows Rigby's uncle, Peter Peckham, around the study, and Mr Peckham sees the large collection of these translations. Rankin pretends to act alarmed, saying that Rigby had told him to hide the books and that he would beat Rankin if he did not. Mr Peckham is appalled by this claim. He gives a sovereign (a substantial amount of money in 1905) intended for Rigby to Rankin instead. Rankin's parents come to live in the town and he becomes a day-boy, which means he is no longer a fag.

=== "The Politeness of Princes" ===
- The Captain, May 1905 (Tales of Wrykyn No. 2)

The title comes from the saying, "Punctuality is the politeness of princes."

Plot

Chapple, a boy in Seymour's house, has trouble dragging himself out of bed in time for breakfast; sleeping in a small room by himself, he generally arrives just as the other boys are leaving, and has to charm the staff into providing him with food and coffee. Eventually, Seymour notices his tardiness, and begins to punish him for arriving late. Chapple, taking advice from his friends, tries leaving the sheets off his bed, so the cold will wake him; he pulls them on again and sleeps on. He tries setting his watch ahead; he forgets to wind it and is later than ever. Finally, he tries leaving his blankets off and setting his watch ahead, but wakes far too early. Taking a stroll round the school to kill time until breakfast, Chapple runs into another boy who is off to do some carpentry; he joins him, but loses track of time in the workshop, and misses breakfast once more. Chapple is moved into the main dormitory, an older boy taking his place in the small room. He no longer arrives late for breakfast, since a prefect in the dormitory makes him get up.

=== "Shields' and the Cricket Cup" ===
- The Captain, June 1905 (Tales of Wrykyn No. 3)

Plot

Mr Shields is the most inconspicuous master on the staff, and similarly, Shields' house is extremely unremarkable. Archie Clephane, a day-boy, joins the house after his parents go to India (though he wanted to join Donaldson's). Another day-boy, Mansfield, also goes to Shields', and forms an alliance with Clephane, particularly as they are both members of the second eleven. Shields' has historically failed to raise a team for the inter-house cricket cup. Henfrey, of Day's, tries to talk Clephane, now the cricket captain for Shields', out of playing in the cup, but Clephane defiantly raises a team, with help from Mansfield. Shields' gets a bye in the first round, then defeats Appleby's, a poor team. The final match is between Day's and Shields', and will last multiple days. Henfrey and his team are confident they will win and do not rush the game. After their second innings, they prematurely celebrate their success with a feast, and all but two young players became ill from a bad rabbit pie. Substitutes can play for Day's, but Clephane points out that substitutes are only allowed to field, not to bowl, so only the two young players can bowl for Day's. Clephane scores many runs and Shields' wins the cup.

=== "An Affair of Boats" ===
- The Captain, July 1905 (Tales of Wrykyn No. 4)

Plot

The story takes place while the vengeful Rankin is still a member of Seymour's. Some athletic contests are held at the school, and Rankin gets into training for the sports, since there are cash prizes. J. R. Leather-Twigg, also known as Shoeblossom, wants to start trouble and tells Rankin to use Capsicum Vaseline as a muscle rub lotion, but this burns if left on too long. Rankin soon discovers this and quickly washes it off, and decides to get revenge. Wrykyn is on the Severn, and one day, Shoeblossom rows on the river to a small island, though it is out of bounds for students. While Shoeblossom is on the island, Rankin ties Shoeblossom's boat to the stern of his own, and rows to a place out of sight of the island. A young man and a young woman come to the island together and explore. Shoeblossm discovers his own boat is missing and takes theirs, feeling that, unlike him, they can shout out for help without getting in trouble. An hour and a half later, Rankin returns to the island to restore Shoeblossom's boat, but the couple thinks Rankin took their boat. The young man, himself an Old Wrykynian, recognizes that Rankin is in Seymour's and says he will report what Rankin did. Rankin regrets that he cannot take revenge on the young man, since he does not know his name or where he lives.

=== "The Last Place" ===
- The Captain, August 1905 (Tales of Wrykyn No. 5)

Plot

There are three openings in the first eleven (the school's primary cricket players). A member of the eleven, Strachan, is at home due to an illness, but is still technically one of the eleven. Ellison and Selwicke, of Donaldson's, are both good batsmen and inseparable friends (the narrator notes that they will later play cricket for Oxford together). Two of the openings on the first eleven must go to a wicket-keeper and a fast bowler, leaving just one place for Ellison or Selwicke. They become rivals and avoid each other. Strachan returns to the school, ensuring that Henfrey, the cricket captain, must eventually make the difficult choice of adding Selwicke or Ellison to the first eleven. In a match against the Incogniti, Ellison makes a mistake that gets Selwicke run out (so Selwicke cannot score more runs), which makes Ellison feel terrible. Ellison scores many runs and is offered the place in the eleven by Henfrey, but refuses, claiming that Selwicke would have scored better than him if not for Ellison's mistake. Strachan tells Henfrey he is not going to play, as he is out of practice, and insists Henfrey put both Ellison and Selwicke in the first eleven. Henfrey is grateful. Selwicke and Ellison are again inseparable.

=== "An International Affair" ===
- The Captain, September 1905 (Tales of Wrykyn No. 6)

Plot

New York businessman Oliver Ring decides to open one of his Come-One Come-All Up-to-date Stores in the town of Wrykyn, near the school. A student at Wrykyn, Linton, is an enthusiastic chemist and spends time in the laboratory. His friend Dunstable visits him there, and is warned by Linton not to eat any of the Sal Ammoniac, which is not very dangerous but would still make him ill. Dunstable is concerned about Ring's new place taking business away from Cook's, a confectioner's shop in town run by the amiable Mr and Mrs Cook. Dunstable and Linton go to Cook's, and find it nearly empty. The students have been drawn away by the cheap public-school tea advertised at Ring's. Later, Dunstable visits Ring's shop and tells Mr Ring his public-school tea is hurting Cook's business, but Ring replies that sentiment cannot interfere with business. Dunstable spends time with some unpopular and unsympathetic students, and treats them to a meal at Ring's shop. They all become ill. The school doctor readily believes the American food of Ring's Stores made them ill. Dunstable tells Linton that he added Sal Ammoniac to the meal, and had trusted Linton that it would not be dangerous. While the doctor is speaking with the Headmaster, they learn that two more students, one of them Linton, are ill after eating at Ring's shop. The Headmaster puts Ring's Stores out of bounds. Two days later, Dunstable and Linton go to Cook's, which is full of students.

=== "The Deserter" ===
- Royal, August 1905

The story is subtitled, "The story of a stolen game of cricket".

Plot

Jackson, of Spence's House, gets a letter from his friend, Neville-Smith, now at Cambridge. Neville-Smith, home for the long vacation, is arranging a match between his village, Bray Lench, and another village, Chalfont St Peter's. He wants Jackson to play for his team. Jackson knows he cannot get permission to play in a village game twenty miles away. O'Hara, of Dexter's, suggests a plan. Jackson is in the Wrykyn military training corps, and there will be a field day in Ealesbury (between Chalfont St Peter's and Bray Lench) on the day of Neville-Smith's match, so Jackson can sneak away to the match. On the day of the match, the Wrykyn corps prepares for a fake fight against an opposing force in Chalfont St Peter's. With Neville-Smith's help, Jackson sneaks away and changes out of his uniform. He plays well and Bray Lench wins. He overhears someone say that the Wrykyn corps is heading for an ambush. Jackson changes back into his uniform and rejoins the corps. He claims he was scouting and warns them about the ambush. Knowing this, they easily capture their opponents. Mr Templar, the lieutenant of the Wrykyn corps, is impressed and believes he must have sent Jackson to scout at some point.

=== "A Division of Spoil" ===
- The Captain, September 1906

Plot

Theodore Merrett, of Seymour's, asks his father for a banjo that costs one pound. His father says he will have to earn it. A school report comes home for Theodore saying that his school work is poor. Mr Merrett has Theodore spend the remainder of the holidays studying. He will buy Theodore a banjo if Theodore brings a prize back with him at the end of the term. Theodore decides to win the French prize for his form, the Lower Fifth. Another student, Tilbury, is in the same form and also wants the French prize. At the end of the term, Tilbury sees Merrett cheating during the French exam. He tells this to Linton, also of the Lower Fifth, who finds out that another student, Firmin, also saw Merrett cheat. Although they all cheat at French during the term, they disapprove of cheating on the exam. Linton tells them not to say anything yet. Merrett is awarded the French prize, a copy of Les Misérables. While the Lower Fifth students are in the form room, Linton declares that they should divide the book since they all have as much right to the prize as Merrett. Linton tears the pages out and hands out equal portions, despite an objection from Tilbury. Linton lets Merrett keep the cover, but this is not enough to get him a banjo.

=== "Educating Aubrey" ===
- London Magazine, May 1911

This is the last Wrykyn story in the collection.

Plot

Aubrey Mickley has until now only been educated at home, and has been spoiled by his mother. He is arrogant and overweight. His uncle George sends him to Wrykyn to be reformed. Aubrey joins West's house. Jack Pearse, also of West's, is the son of the gamekeeper on Uncle George's estate. He is able to attend Wrykyn because of George and feels an obligation to him. Acting on his instructions, Jack arranges with Fry, the easygoing head of West's, for Aubrey to be his fag. Pearse wants to make Aubrey a creditable member of the house, but Stanworth, a fellow prefect whom Jack dislikes, interferes because he finds the spoiled Aubrey amusing. Fry tells Pearse about a gambling board with holes and numbers he saw in Stanworth's study. Gambling is not permitted, but Stanworth denies actually using the board. Later, Pearse discovers Stanworth gambling with Aubrey and two other students. The two others leave to avoid getting in trouble. Jack picks up a walking stick and breaks multiple objects in the wealthy Stanworth's room. Jack invites Stanworth to report all the facts, but Stanworth does not do so. Aubrey, who previously believed his ancestry made him superior to Jack, has a newfound respect for him. Jack orders Aubrey to behave better and play rugby for the house. Much later, Mrs Mickley visits the school. She is surprised to find that Aubrey is now dedicated to playing rugby for West's.

=== "The Strange Disappearance of Mr Buxton-Smythe" ===
- Public School Magazine, December 1901

The story was subtitled "a thrilling school-story" in Public School Magazine. "The Strange Disappearance of Mr. Buxton-Smythe" is the first of two detective stories involving crimes committed at a school called St Asterisk's.

Plot

The narrator, Dr Wotsing, notes that the following story occurred before he was married, when he was still living in Grocer Square with the detective Mr Burdock Rose (a parody of Sherlock Holmes). Wotsing has been so successful studying Rose's methods that he has become even more astute than Rose. He corrects Rose's deductions, which irritates the detective. A client, a schoolmaster from St Asterisks's named Theophilus Wright, consults them about the disappearance of a Sixth-form master, Mr Buxton-Smythe. Buxton-Smythe entered his form room and was never seen again. The students in the form claim they do not know where he is, but Wright says their manner is suspicious. Rose suspects Wright. However, Wotsing solves the case. He discovered that Buxton-Smythe assigned multiple essays in a row on the same subject. The students were all simultaneously driven to madness by the fourth repetitive essay, and they killed and ate the schoolmaster, which is why he disappeared. The local coroner is sympathetic to the students and blames Buxton-Smythe. Rose, annoyed by Wotsing's success, looks forward to Wotsing's forthcoming marriage and departure from Grocer Square.

=== "The Adventure of the Split Infinitive" ===
- Public School Magazine, March 1902

Plot

Dr Wotsing narrates another story from the old Grocer Square days before his marriage. In the story, he travels with the detective Burdock Rose to St Asterisk's for another case. Wotsing has become a better detective than Rose by learning from his methods, and annoys Rose by correcting his deductions. Smith, the school porter at St Asterisk's, discovered a crime had been committed in the Sixth-form room. The victim was an infinitive. It had been split, apparently by some blunt weapon such as a bad pen. The body was on a piece of paper, which was found under the desk belonging to a member of the form, Vanderpoop. He has been arrested and is awaiting trial. After investigating the form room, Rose believes Vanderpoop is guilty, but Wotsing proves Rose wrong and deduces that the real culprit is the Headmaster. The Headmaster, who was stout but has become thin from anxiety within a single day, admits he split the infinitive. He explains that he was educated thoroughly in Latin and Greek, while his English education was neglected. Wotsing pities him and lets him go. Later, Rose remarks that he is glad Wotsing will be married in a month, and buys a calendar to count down the days.

=== "Welch's Mile Record" ===
- The Captain, November 1902

This is the first of three stories in the collection set at St Austin's.

Plot

There is a feud between Welch, the cricket captain of Merevale's, and his Housemaster Mr Merevale, which started after Merevale insulted Welch for mismanaging the bowling in a cricket match. Near the end of the term, Welch prepares for the school mile race. The school is excited for him to break the school record. One night, at one o'clock in the morning, somebody wakes up Welch. It is Merevale. He is very serious and tells Welch to get his running clothes on. Merevale's ten-year-old daughter Marjorie, who regularly cheers for Merevale's sports teams and is worshipped by the house, is dangerously ill with diphtheria. Merevale wants Welch to get Doctor Adamson. Adamson lives in the village, a mile away by road. Welch sprints to Adamson's house, beating the school record time. He hands a note from Merevale to the doctor. Welch is too exhausted to move, so the doctor leaves him on a sofa and goes by dog-cart to St Austin's. He is just in time to save Marjorie. Merevale goes back with Dr Adamson to thank Welch. Later, Welch is too worn out to compete in the race, but Merevale gives him a silver cup, a double of the school mile cup, for his run that night. Welch achieves better times after he leaves school, but always considers that run his best mile, as does Merevale.

=== "Pillingshot, Detective" ===
- The Captain, September 1910
  - American Boy (US), August 1923

Plot

Pillingshot fags for Scott, and though Scott is sometimes kind to Pillingshot, he has a sense of humour that can lead to trouble for the more serious Pillingshot. Evans, a student of Pillingshot's age, has lost a sovereign and thinks someone stole it. Scott has been reading a Sherlock Holmes story. He pushes Pillingshot to become a detective and investigate Evans's case. Evans says that his rich uncle gave him the sovereign, which disappeared sometime in the night. Scott gives Pillingshot a notebook and tells him to work on clues. At Scott's insistence, Pillingshot asks the other students in Evans's dormitory if they stole the sovereign, which only annoys them, especially the prefect Trent, who is in a bad mood and apparently hits Pillingshot. Pillingshot finds the path of an amateur detective to be a difficult one, until one morning he is suddenly jaunty. Scott notices this and questions him. Pillingshot shows him some small clues, including dried mud and a used match, but does not say more about his investigation. This makes Scott curious and he agrees to let Pillingshot off fagging for the rest of the term if Pillingshot solves the case. The next day, Pillingshot shows Scott the sovereign. He explains that two days before, Evans told him it had been found by a housemaid near Evans's bed.

=== "Pillingshot's Paper" ===
- The Captain, February 1911

Plot

Pillingshot is no longer fagging for Scott, though Scott still sometimes pushes Pillingshot to do things. Scott starts an unofficial school newspaper, and has Pillingshot edit it. Scott devotes the paper, The Rapier, to insulting Henry's house, which has a feud with the School House, to which Scott and Pillingshot belong. This is not the first unofficial newspaper at St Austin's, as there is another titled The Glow-Worm (secretly edited by Charteris, of Merevale's), but whereas The Glow-Worm is essentially a more succinct version of the official Austinian, The Rapier is more libelous, and also free. Nearly everyone reads it. Pillingshot is gratified to be part of a popular publication, but fears what will happen if the head of the School House, Rudd, finds out who edits the paper, since Rudd disapproves of the house feud. Rudd, unaware of the truth, tells Scott about the paper, and Scott says he will have Pillingshot, the amateur detective, find out who is behind it. In reality, Scott continues writing the paper with Pillingshot as editor. Beale, of Henry's, discovers that Pillingshot has an issue of The Rapier that has not yet been published. Rudd learns about this and immediately suspects Scott. Scott hopes to play rugby for St Austin's first fifteen, and Rudd, who has just become captain, threatens to keep Scott from playing if he continues The Rapier. Scott cancels the paper.

=== "An Afternoon Dip" ===
- Pearson's, September 1904
  - Greyfriars Holiday Annual (UK), 1925 (as "Jackson's Dip!"; this text used for the collection)

This is the first of four stories set at Locksley.

Plot

On a very hot day, Jackson decides to sneak out of his French class, instructed by Monsieur Gautier, and swim in the school pond. He tells his plan to his neighbour Royce and asks him to move slightly so Gautier will not notice someone is missing. Gautier calls another student, Firmin, up to translate Erckmann-Chatrian's L'Invasion. Firmin does badly, which distracts Gautier and allows Jackson to leave unnoticed through the open door. He goes quickly to the pond and swims there. Knowing he cannot stay away too long or Gautier will realise he has gone, Jackson soon leaves the water and puts his clothes back on. He sees the schoolmaster Mr Knight approaching and flees through the shrubbery, so Knight only catches a glimpse of a figure. Jackson returns to Gautier's room and is shocked to see the door is shut. Since he cannot sneak back in, he knocks on the door and opens it. He asks if he may come in and says he will be quiet, leading Gautier to believe he had sent Jackson out of the room and had forgotten. Royce supports this story by asking for Jackson to be allowed to enter the room again, which Gautier allows. Mr Knight dislikes having trouble with students and does not bother to investigate what he saw.

=== "A Corner in Lines" ===
- Pearson's, January 1905

Plot

Dunstable, of Day's, misbehaves in class, and is assigned to write out lines by Mr Langridge. It is the end of the term and Dunstable thinks he can ignore the punishment. However, when he returns for the next term, Mr Day is aware Dunstable did not do the lines and tells Dunstable he will have lines to write out during a half-holiday. Dunstable's friend, Charles J. Linton, of Seymour's, knows that Day usually assigns the Greek numerals, and together they write out the lines in advance. However, Day assigns irregular verbs instead. Linton helps Dunstable write out these lines too, and Dunstable keeps the other lines. Dunstable is also set lines by Mr Forman, but Forman forgets to collect these, and Linton is able to recover lines he wrote for Mr Appleby. Linton thinks of selling their stock, and Dunstable suggests they write more lines to sell. Handwriting is not a problem since the students all have the same poor handwriting when it comes to lines. They start the Locksley Lines Supplying Trust, Ltd., and distribute advertisements. Prices vary between threepence and sixpence per hundred lines. Linton gives some lines to Jackson, of Dexter's, for free, and these lines pass, which leads to many orders coming in. Merrett, of Seymour's, tries to start a rival company but his lines are spotted by Mr Appleby as someone else's work. Merrett is vindictive and reveals Dunstable and Linton's business to Mr Appleby. Appleby puts an end to it, but he is amused and does not punish them.

=== "The Autograph Hunters" ===
- Pearson's, February 1905 (as "The Autograph Hunter")
  - Metropolitan (US), November 1922 (as "Mr. Watson's Autograph")

Plot

The novelist Mr Watson, writer of The Soul of Anthony Carrington (published by Popgood and Grooly, a firm mentioned in other Wodehouse stories such as Ice in the Bedroom), has recently moved to a house close to Chesterton, near the school. Mr Day wishes he could add Mr Watson's signature to his collection. Dunstable, of Day's, dislikes the book, but feels that Mr Day has treated him fairly and wants to reward him with Mr Watson's autograph. Mr Watson is notorious for denying requests for autographs. Dunstable attempts to write a touching letter, pretending to be a little boy who wants Mr Watson's signature, but the author, as he usually does, simply has his secretary Morrison send a curt reply. With help from his friend Linton, Dunstable tries to write two more letters from different admirers, but he only receives more curt replies from the secretary. Next, Dunstable visits Watson's estate in person. He trespasses multiple times, and is finally caught by the groundskeeper. Mr Watson asks him for his name and house, and says he will report Dunstable to his Housemaster. Later, Mr Day speaks to Dunstable about an indignant letter he received from Mr Watson. Day tells him to write out the Greek numerals ten times as punishment. Dunstable remarks that he is glad that Mr Day got Mr Watson's autograph. On consideration, Day reduces Dunstable's punishment to the first ode of the first book of Horace.

=== "Playing the Game" ===
- Pearson's, May 1906
  - Greyfriars Holiday Annual (UK), 1924 (as "Scott's Sister")

Plot

The unidentified narrator states that women are noted for snakiness, and points to Billy Scott's sister Molly as an example. Charteris spends a week at his friend Scott's house and meets Molly. Scott is a member of the School House while Charteris is in Merevale's, but they know each other because they are both in the first eleven. Molly is amiable, pretty, and passionate about cricket. She is nearly an adult but not yet old enough to put her hair up as an adult would, though she is eager to be considered one. Billy tells an embarrassing story about her, when she shoved part of her hair under her collar to look as if her hair was up, and she is grateful when Charteris is sympathetic to her. After he returns to school, they correspond by letter. The final house cricket match is between Merevale's and the School House. Charteris gets a letter from Molly before the match, and the narrator claims that this letter illustrates her snakiness. She asks him to bowl an easy ball to Billy, who is always nervous in his first over, and says she will send Charteris the photograph of her that he wanted if he does this. Charteris ponders this, and remarks that he thought she really understood the finer points of cricket. The narrator wants to end the story there, but reluctantly provides a little more information. Charteris does not go easy on Scott, as shown by Scott's extremely low scores in two innings. Despite the narrator's claims, Molly sends Charteris her photograph anyway and hopes he likes it.

=== "Blenkinsop's Benefit" ===
- The Captain, August 1904

This story is the first of two involving the school of Beckford.

Plot

The narrator, an unnamed cricketer, is playing for the Weary Willies against a small village team, and recognizes one of their players, Blenkinsop, the local curate. They have not seen each other since they were at Beckford ten years ago. The narrator recalls the following story. The narrator, Blenkinsop, and their friends (including Benson, Perkyn, and others) are a close-knit and spirited group of friends in Jephson's house. Blenkinsop is leaving Beckford to study in other countries. His friends, led by Benson, secretly form the Blenkinsop Benefit Society and plan a farewell two-day party consisting of indoor sports and a special supper. They announce the benefit to Blenkinsop a week before the event. Blenkinsop is grateful, and also suggests they add music to the party. The day comes, and they enjoy dancing and playing games, though they are assigned lines by Mr Jephson when they miss chapel. Their supper includes a case of pineapples sent by Perkyn's brother from the West Indies. A large centipede comes out of the case. The friends attack it together, coordinating with each other as if playing rugby. They kill it, but the noise brings Mr Jephson. He is angry about being woken up at one in the morning. Mr Jephson sends Perkyn, who was stung by the centipede, to the school doctor, and while the others get caned as punishment the next day. Nonetheless, they are glad they gave Blenkinsop a good send-off.

=== "Personally Conducted" ===
- Cassell's, July 1907

The story's narrator, Joan Romney, also narrates four other short stories by Wodehouse that were published in UK magazines: "The Wire-Pullers" (1905), "Petticoat Influence" (1906), "Ladies and Gentlemen v. Players" (1908), and "Against the Clock" (1909).

Plot

The story is narrated by Joan Romney. She is sixteen years old and lives in Much Middlefold. Much Middlefold's cricket team, led by Joan's father, is going to play cricket against another town, Anfield. On the morning of the match, Mr Romney learns that their best bowler cannot play, and asks Joan if she can think of a substitute. She suggests Alan Gethryn, a sort of cousin of hers at Beckford, a nearby school. Mr Romney likes this idea, so she goes there by bicycle. Alan agrees to play, though he must not get caught because Much Middlefold is out of bounds for students. Mr Romney asks Joan to show an acquaintance who is interested in antiques the way to the nearby old church. It turns out to be Alan's Housemaster, Mr Leicester. Alan asks Joan to keep Mr Leicester away. She leads Mr Leicester to the church and locks the door while they are inside. Mr Leicester examines an old tablet and she explores the roof. When Mr Leicester is ready to leave, Joan drops the keys over the parapet, claiming it was an accident. They wait for help. Eventually, Mr Leicester calls out to someone passing by, who lets them out in exchange for a half crown. When they reach the field, Joan rushes ahead to warn Alan, and he is able to avoid Mr Leicester. Much Middlefold wins. Joan puts Leicester's bicycle out of order for ten minutes, allowing Alan to safely return to the school on his own bicycle.

=== "The Guardian" ===
- Windsor, September 1908
  - Novel Magazine (UK), September 1920 (as "Looking After Thomas")

"The Guardian" is set at Eckleton.

Plot

Thomas Beauchamp Algernon Shearne is a new student at Eckleton. His mother has asked her friend Mrs Davy to tell her nephew (Spencer) to look after Thomas. Spencer forgets about this until he receives a postal order for five bob and a letter from Mrs Shearne. Thomas has told her he is happy at school, so she thinks Spencer is helping him. In fact, Thomas is tough and able to look after himself. After Spencer receives another postal order from Mrs Sherne, he is urged by his friend Phipps, who is also friends with Thomas, to spend time with Thomas and earn the money. However, Thomas does not want someone to look after him, and is very rude to Spencer. Spencer considers it the last straw when, while they are swimming, he is ducked into the water by Thomas. After they all leave the pool, he kicks Thomas. It is clear there will be a fight, so Phipps insists on being the referee so it will not get out of hand. Thomas and Spencer are evenly matched. At the end of the seventh round, Phipps declares a draw and helps both of them home. Mrs Shearne sends Spencer another postal order. Spencer writes a reply admitting that he fought with Thomas, and sends back the postal order. However, he later learns that Thomas now respects him. Thomas apologizes for ducking him, and invites him to tea. Spencer gets a letter from Thomas's father and older brother, who thank Spencer for keeping Thomas's arrogance in check and send him two postal orders.

=== "Stone and the Weed" ===
- The Captain, May 1910
  - Boys' Life (US), August 1923/March 1936/March 1971

"Stone and the Weed" is set at Sedleigh.

Plot

W. J. Stone, of Outwood's, smokes a cigarette in a secluded spot four miles from the school. Collard, the school Sergeant, sees Stone smoking. Stone would probably be punished for smoking with lines or detention, so he flings away the cigarette and denies smoking. Collard is not deterred. He dislikes Stone, since Stone gave him the nickname "Boots", and is eager to report him to Mr Outwood. After Collard leaves, a man drives by in a car and asks Stone for directions. The man agrees to drive Stone to Sedleigh, which is in the direction he is going. He is late and drives quickly. At the school, a rugby match is in progress, and Stone asks his friend Robinson about the match. Stone then makes conversation with a schoolmaster, Mr Downing, using what Robinson told him to convince Downing that he saw the game. Later, Stone is summoned to Mr Outwood's study for smoking, and Sergeant Collard is there. Stone says that Collard must be mistaken. He points out that he spoke with Mr Downing only a short time after Collard claims to have seen him four miles away, and he could not have returned that quickly since he did not have a bicycle. Outwood believes Stone. At that moment a policeman comes, looking for the speeding motorist. The policeman saw a young man in a red and blue striped cap in the car, which members of Outwood's house wear. He recognizes Stone, and thus Collard is triumphant.

== Publication history ==
In The Captain, T. M. R. Whitwell illustrated "Ruthless Reginald", "The Politeness of Princes", "Shields' and the Cricket Cup", "An Affair of Boats", "The Last Place", "An International Affair", "A Division of Spoil", "Welch's Mile Record", "Pillingshot, Detective", "Pillingshot's Paper", "Blenkinsop's Benefit", and "Stone and the Weed".

In The Royal Magazine, Gordon Browne illustrated "Homœopathic Treatment", "The Reformation of Study Sixteen", and "The Deserter". Browne also illustrated "A Corner in Lines" and "The Autograph Hunters" in Pearson's. Harold Copping illustrated "Jackson's Extra" in The Royal Magazine and "Playing the Game" in Pearson's Magazine.

"An Afternoon Dip" was illustrated by R. C. Carter in Pearson's. "Educating Aubrey" was illustrated by Thomas Maybank in The London Magazine. "Personally Conducted" was illustrated by Lucien Davis in Cassell's Magazine. "The Guardian" was illustrated by L. Raven-Hill in Windsor Magazine.

"Scott's Sister" and "Jackson's Dip!" were illustrated by Saville Lumley in the Greyfriars Holiday Annual. "Homœopathic Treatment" was illustrated by Enos B. Comstock in Boys' Life, and "Stone and the Weed" was illustrated by Francis J. Rigney in 1923 in the same magazine. "Mr. Watson's Autograph" was illustrated by A. L. Bairnsfather in Metropolitan. "Pillingshot, Detective" was illustrated by Wallace Drew in American Boy. "The Reformation of Study Sixteen" was illustrated by Winston Haberer in Radio Digest. "Looking After Thomas" was published with one title illustration by Thomas Henry in Novel Magazine.

"Pillingshot, Detective", "A Corner in Lines", and "The Autograph Hunters" were collected in The Uncollected Wodehouse (1976). "The Politeness of Princes", "Shields' and the Cricket Cup", "An International Affair", and "The Guardian" were collected in The Swoop! and Other Stories (1979). "Jackson's Extra", "The Strange Disappearance of Mr Buxton-Smythe", "The Adventure of the Split Infinitive", and "The Deserter" were collected in Plum Stones (1993). "The Politeness of Princes" was the title story of the Project Gutenberg eBook The Politeness of Princes and Other School Stories.

"The Guardian" was included in the 1909 US anthology Golden Stories, A Selection of the Best Fiction by the Foremost Writers. "Pillingshot, Detective" was included in the 1926 anthology The Treasure Ship: A Book of Prose and Verse, which was edited by Lady Cynthia Asquith and published by Partridge, London, and Scribner's, New York.

== See also ==
- List of Wodehouse's school short stories
- Tales of St. Austin's
