= The Eighteen-Carat Kid and Other Stories =

1980 collection of early short stories and a novella by P. G. Wodehouse

First edition

The Eighteen-Carat Kid and Other Stories is a collection of early short stories and a novella by P. G. Wodehouse, first published in the United States on September 1, 1980 by Continuum, New York City, five years after Wodehouse's death.

The collection was edited and introduced by one of Wodehouse's biographers, David A. Jasen. The stories had all previously appeared in magazines, and William Tell Told Again (a retelling of the William Tell legend) was published as an illustrated book in the United Kingdom in 1904.

== Contents ==
- "The Eighteen-Carat Kid"
  - UK: The Captain, January to March, 1913
- "The Wire-Pullers" (starring Joan Romney)
  - UK: The Strand Magazine, July 1905
  - US: Strand (US), August 1905
- "The Prize Poem" (A school story, which appeared in the UK collection Tales of St. Austin's)
  - UK: Public School Magazine, July 1901
- William Tell Told Again
- "Epilogue"

== See also ==
- A categorised list of Wodehouse's short stories
