= The Uncollected Wodehouse =

Short story collection by P. G. Wodehouse

First edition

The Uncollected Wodehouse is a collection of early newspaper and magazine articles and short stories by P. G. Wodehouse. First published in the United States on 18 October 1976 by Seabury Press, New York City, it contains 14 short stories. Five of the stories had appeared in the United Kingdom in the 1914 collection The Man Upstairs, and all had previously appeared in UK periodicals between 1901 and 1915; some had also appeared in the U.S. Five short items are included from 1900–1906 UK magazines, ten from 1914–1919, and nine from the U.S. Vanity Fair magazine.

The collection was edited and introduced by David A. Jasen, with a foreword by Malcolm Muggeridge.

== Contents ==
- "When Papa Swore in Hindustani"
  - United Kingdom: Answers, 24 August 1901

According to David A. Jasen, this was the first of multiple sentimental stories that Wodehouse wrote specifically to please magazine editors. Wodehouse did not approve of the title of the story, which was chosen by the Answers staff. The story is very short and is six pages long in the first edition of the collection. For comparison, "The Good Angel" is 15 pages long and "The Man Upstairs" is 16 pages long.

- "A Corner in Lines" (also published in the 1997 UK collection Tales of Wrykyn and Elsewhere)
  - UK: Pearson's, January 1905
- "The Autograph Hunters" (also in Tales of Wrykyn and Elsewhere)
  - UK: Pearson's, February 1905 (as "The Autograph Hunter"; source for this book)
  - United States: Metropolitan, November 1922 (set in U.S. with some name changes and minor rewriting)
- "Tom, Dick–and Harry" (also published in the 1993 UK collection Plum Stones)
  - UK: Grand, June 1905

According to Owen Dudley Edwards, "Tom, Dick–and Harry" was published in the 1909 anthology Twenty-Five Cricket Stories, and has a plot that is very similar to that of the Drones Club story "Tried in the Furnace". The story is ten pages long in the first edition of this collection.

- "The Good Angel" (appears in The Man Upstairs collection)
  - UK: Strand, February 1910 (source for this book)
  - US: Cosmopolitan, February 1910 (relocated to the U.S., retitled "The Matrimonial Sweepstakes")

The Cosmopolitan story "The Matrimonial Sweepstakes", a reset and slightly lengthened version of "The Good Angel", marks the earliest mention of a Lord Emsworth.

- "The Man Upstairs" (also in The Man Upstairs)
  - UK: Strand, March 1910 (source for this book)
  - US: Cosmopolitan, March 1910 (relocated to the U.S.)
- "Misunderstood"
  - UK: Nash's, May 1910 (source for this book)
  - US: Burr McIntosh Monthly, May 1910 (longer version with U.S. setting)

"Misunderstood" is one of the shortest stories in The Uncollected Wodehouse, being eight pages long in the first edition of the collection.

- "Pillingshot, Detective" (also in Tales of Wrykyn and Elsewhere)
  - UK: The Captain, September 1910
- "When Doctors Disagree" (also in The Man Upstairs)
  - UK: Strand, December 1910 (source for this book)
  - US: Success, March 1911 (relocated to the U.S.)
- "The Best Sauce"
  - UK: Strand, July 1911 (source for this book)
  - US: Pictorial Review, February 1913 (retitled "The Dinner of Herbs" with plot and name changes)

"The Best Sauce" was published in the Strand with illustrations by René Bull. The story is 15 pages long in the first edition of this collection.

- "Pots o' Money" (also in The Man Upstairs)
  - UK: Strand, December 1911 (source for this book)
  - US: Metropolitan, February 1912 (set in U.S. with some name changes)
- "Ruth in Exile" (also in The Man Upstairs)
  - UK: Strand, July 1912 (source for this book)
  - US: Ainslee's Magazine, August 1912 (with American characters in France and one name change)
- "Death at the Excelsior" (also in Plum Stones, reprinted here from abridged text appearing in Ellery Queen's Mystery Magazine, May 1978)
  - UK: Pearson's, December 1914 (original title: "The Education of Detective Oakes")
  - US: All-Story Cavalier Weekly, 13 March 1915 (longest of all versions, under the title "The Harmonica Mystery")

"The Harmonica Mystery" was also published in The Saint Detective Magazine (US) in June 1955. "Death at the Excelsior" is the longest story in The Uncollected Wodehouse and is 23 pages long in this collection.

- "The Test Case" (also in Plum Stones; a Reggie Pepper story, book version shortened from U.S. magazine appearance)
  - UK: Pearson's, December 1915
  - US: Illustrated Sunday Magazine, 12 December 1915

Two of the "articles" collected by Jasen contain dialogue between fictional characters and thus may be considered short-short fiction: "An Unfinished Collection" from Punch, 17 September 1902 and "The Secret Pleasures of Reginald" from Vanity Fair, June 1915.

== See also ==
- A categorised list of Wodehouse's short stories
