= The Coming of Bill =

1919 novel by P. G. Wodehouse

- First edition (UK)
- Author: P. G. Wodehouse
- Language: English
- Publisher: US: Boni & Liveright; UK: Herbert Jenkins Ltd
- Publication date: US: 5 August 1919; UK: 1 July 1920
- Publication place: United States
- Media type: Print

The Coming of Bill is a novel by P. G. Wodehouse. It was published as Their Mutual Child in the United States on 5 August 1919 by Boni & Liveright, New York, and as The Coming of Bill in the United Kingdom on 1 July 1920 by Herbert Jenkins Ltd, London. The story first appeared in Munsey's Magazine (US) in May 1914 under the title The White Hope.

The novel tells the story of Kirk Winfield, his wife Ruth, and their young son, Bill. Bill's upbringing is interfered with by Ruth's busybody aunt, Mrs. Lora Delane Porter, who is an author of books intended to uplift the public mind.

Unlike most of Wodehouse's novels, it is not a comic novel. According to publisher Penguin Books, The Coming of Bill "is the nearest Wodehouse ever came to a serious novel, although the influence of the musical comedies he was writing at the time is never far away."

== Plot ==
In New York, Mrs. Lora Delane Porter, domineering writer of books about eugenics and germs, drives too fast and hits George Pennicut, whose leg is injured. George is a man-of-all-work employed by Kirk Winfield, an amiable though unsuccessful artist who lives on modest private means. Kirk carries George into his apartment and calls in a doctor. George will recover completely after a couple of days. Mrs. Porter notices that Kirk is healthy and physically fit, and decides he should marry her niece Ruth Bannister, daughter of wealthy financier John Bannister. Ruth believes in her aunt's views on eugenics, in contrast to her brother Bailey Bannister, John Bannister's son and junior partner, who thinks Mrs. Porter is a bad influence on Ruth. Mrs. Porter introduces Ruth to Kirk, and they fall in love. Percy Shanklyn, an unemployed actor who borrows money from Kirk, does not want him to marry Ruth, so he tells Bailey about Kirk and Ruth. Bailey suspects Mrs. Porter's interference. He objects to Mrs. Porter and Ruth that Kirk is a nobody and an outsider. He also confronts Kirk, but inadvertently reveals to him that Ruth returns his feelings. Kirk's friend Steve Dingle, self-described roughneck and retired boxer who is employed as physical instructor for the Bannisters, advises him to elope with Ruth to avoid trouble with her controlling father. Mr. Bannister rejects Ruth after she marries Kirk.

Some months later, Kirk is happily married to Ruth, though she forbids him from employing models. She decides to pose for Kirk once but faints, and it is revealed that she is pregnant. Time passes, and Kirk and Ruth have a son, "Bill", William Bannister Winfield. Steve, Bill's godfather, wants the baby to become heavyweight boxing champion of the world and encourages this by calling him the "White Hope". Steve is also in love with his old friend Mamie, Bill's nurse. Mrs. Porter feels that Bill must not be exposed to germs and his nursery should be sterilized, though Ruth dismisses this. When Bill is three years old, Kirk's private income drops when a stock he invested in fails. Bailey's fiancée Sybil Wilbur, a friend of Ruth's, wants Kirk to paint her portrait. Kirk has lost his skill due to not working and the portrait turns out badly. Bailey accuses Kirk of being an idle waster. Kirk sees the truth in this and joins his friend Hank Jardine mining gold in Columbia.

A year later, Kirk returns to New York, his trip to Columbia a failure. He nearly died of fever in Columbia, and Hank Jardine did die. Kirk is glad to see Ruth again. He is surprised that they are now rich, because John Bannister died and Ruth inherited half his money. Ruth now agrees with Mrs. Porter about germs, since Bill became extremely ill once. Bill lives in a sterilized environment and is not supposed to be hugged, which Kirk finds absurd. Steve visits Mamie in Bill's nursery without permission from Mrs. Porter, but does not manage to confess his feelings for her and she helps him escape when Mrs. Porter comes with a doctor to show her the sanitized nursery. Kirk and Ruth drift apart, since Ruth has been changed by her father's money and has devoted herself to high society life. Kirk notices that Ruth is not really concerned about germs and thinks that she is keeping her distance from Bill because she is bored with him. Kirk hires an old acquaintance, artist Robert Dwight Penway, to teach him painting, and starts selling illustrations.

Bailey still dislikes Kirk but he hates Basil Milbank, a man who once came close to marrying Ruth, and warns Kirk that Ruth has been associating with Basil. Kirk suggests to Ruth they go with Bill to Kirk's shack in Connecticut, but Ruth refuses. Kirk, upset with Ruth for being distant and allowing Mrs. Porter to interfere, leaves. Steve, hoping to reunite Kirk and Ruth, decides to kidnap Bill. Bill happily goes with him to Connecticut. Steve leaves a note for Mamie. She tells Kirk, and they follow Steve. Meanwhile, Ruth, who has realized Kirk was right, goes to see Bailey. He is very ill due to stress from work. Bailey recovers, but his financial risks have failed and he and Ruth have lost their money. Ruth is glad the money is gone, and has new respect for Bailey, since she sees how much his wife Sybil cares about him. Ruth assures Sybil that Bailey will be successful again. Mrs. Porter, thinking Kirk has run off with Mamie, finds Ruth and brings her to Connecticut. In Connecticut, Mrs. Porter is defeated when Steve says Mamie is his fiancée and Ruth reconciles with Kirk. Kirk looks forward to living a happy, simple life with her and Bill.

== Style ==
Much of Wodehouse's work combines elements of romance and humour or farce, including even the relatively serious stories The Coming of Bill and The Little Nugget. One example in The Coming of Bill of a "typically Wodehousian" farcical remark is a quote which makes light of Mrs. Porter's views on heredity, after she drives too fast and hits George Pennicut with her car (in chapter I.1): "She was incensed with this idiot who had flung himself before her car, not reflecting in her heat that he probably had a pre-natal tendency to this sort of thing inherited from some ancestor who had played "last across" in front of hansom cabs in the streets of London."

== Background ==
In The Coming of Bill, a butler named Keggs is employed by the Bannisters and later by the Winfields. A butler named Keggs appears in several other Wodehouse stories, though it is unclear which of these characters are the same. Other stories with such a character include the 1909 novella The Gem Collector and the 1910 short story “The Good Angel” (collected in The Man Upstairs). There is a landlord and retired butler named Augustus Keggs in Something Fishy (1957) and Ice in the Bedroom (1961), who was a butler in the 1919 novel A Damsel in Distress.

Wodehouse married his wife Ethel in 1914 and gained a step-daughter, Leonora; when Wodehouse first met Leonora in 1915, they immediately became close, and he formally adopted her later that year. According to writer Sophie Ratcliffe, this meant that "Wodehouse's 1914 satire on the fashion of eugenic family planning (The White Hope) was oddly prescient. Family, for Wodehouse, was forged through love, not genetics. Leonora – or "Snorky" – as she soon became, was far more precious to Wodehouse than any of his biological relations."

== Publication history ==
Wodehouse stated in a letter in 1964 that he got the plot of the story from Munsey's Magazine editor Bob Davis. As Wodehouse wrote in the letter concerning the story: "It was written in 1910 in the days when Bob Davis edited the Munsey pulps and we young authors used to go to him for plots. He would take a turn around the room and come up with a complete plot for a serial, usually horrible but of course saleable to Munsey's! He gave me the plot of this one and I wrote it, but I have never thought highly of it".

The story was first published in May 1914 in one issue of Munsey's Magazine under the title The White Hope, with illustrations by E. M. Ashe. It was one of two Wodehouse stories published in Munsey's Magazine, the other being The Little Nugget, which was published in the magazine in 1913.

== Adaptations ==
A silent film version titled Their Mutual Child was released in 1920.
