= The Swoop! and Other Stories =

Collection of short stories

First edition

The Swoop! and Other Stories is a collection of early short stories and a novella by P. G. Wodehouse, first published in the United States on 11 April 1979 by the Seabury Press, New York City, four years after Wodehouse's death.

The collection was edited and introduced by Wodehouse's biographer, David A. Jasen, and featured an "appreciation" by Malcolm Muggeridge. The Swoop! (a satirical spoof) was published as a book in the United Kingdom in 1909, and many of the stories had previously appeared in magazines. Two of them also featured in the UK collection Tales of St. Austin's (1903), and four in The Man Upstairs (1914).

== Contents ==
- The Swoop! (1909)
- "Bradshaw's Little Story" (appeared in Tales of St. Austin's)
  - UK: The Captain, July 1902
- "A Shocking Affair" (also in Tales of St. Austin's)
  - UK: Puffin Post, Q2 1973
- "The Politeness of Princes" (also in the 1997 collection Tales of Wrykyn and Elsewhere)
  - UK: The Captain, May 1905
- "Shields' and the Cricket Cup" (also in Tales of Wrykyn and Elsewhere)
  - UK: The Captain, June 1905
- "An International Affair" (also in Tales of Wrykyn and Elsewhere)
  - UK: The Captain, September 1905
- "The Guardian" (also in Tales of Wrykyn and Elsewhere)
  - UK: Windsor Magazine, September 1908
- "Something to Worry About" (appeared in The Man Upstairs)
  - UK: Strand, February 1913
- "The Tuppenny Millionaire" (also in The Man Upstairs)
  - UK: Strand, October 1912
- "Deep Waters" (also in The Man Upstairs)
  - US: Collier's Weekly, 28 May 1910
  - UK: Strand, June 1910
- "The Goal-Keeper and the Plutocrat" (also in The Man Upstairs)
  - UK: Strand, January 1912
  - US: Collier's Weekly, 24 September 1924 (as "The Pitcher and the Plutocrat")

== See also ==
- A categorised list of Wodehouse's short stories
