= The Little Nugget =

1913 novel by P. G. Wodehouse

- First US edition
- Author: P. G. Wodehouse
- Language: English
- Genre: Comic novel
- Publisher: Methuen (UK), Watt (US)
- Publication date: 28 August 1913 (UK); 10 February 1914 (US)
- Publication place: United Kingdom
- Media type: Print (hardback & paperback)

The Little Nugget is a novel by P. G. Wodehouse. It was first published in Munsey's Magazine in August 1913, before being published as a book in the UK on 28 August 1913 by Methuen & Co., London, and in the US on 10 January 1914 by W. J. Watt & Co., New York. An earlier version of the story, without the love interest, had appeared as a serial in The Captain between January and March 1913 under the title The Eighteen-Carat Kid; this version was not published in the US until August 1980, when it appeared in a volume entitled The Eighteen-Carat Kid and Other Stories. The Little Nugget was reprinted in the Philadelphia Record on 12 May 1940.

== Plot summary ==
Mrs Nesta Ford, in her London hotel room, reveals to her new friend Lord Mountry that she hopes to take her son Ogden on a yachting trip proposed by Mountry, despite her ex-husband having won custody of the boy. As Mountry leaves, Cynthia Drassilis arrives with Ogden, whom she has led away from his father's country house. Mrs Ford rewards Cynthia, but soon Mr Ford's secretary, a Mr Minnick, arrives to recover the stolen child. Cynthia tries to bribe his colleague, Mrs Sheridan, but to no avail, as she believes Nesta's influence has spoiled the boy. After they have gone, Nesta reveals to Cynthia Ogden's past as the 'Little Nugget', and the repeated attempts to kidnap him made by US gangsters. Nesta wishes to call in professional help, but Cynthia persuades her she can still do it, with the help of her new fiancé, a wealthy man called Peter Burns, who she suggests can take up a post at Ogden's new school, posing as a trainee schoolmaster.

We meet Peter Burns, and learn that he fell deeply in love, sometime between the ages of 21 and 25, with a Miss Audrey Blake, daughter of an impoverished artist. Though he treated her in a patronising way, they got engaged, but shortly after the death of her father, she ran off and married another man. This event crushed Burns, once a carefree and selfish youth, and after some years of travel he returned to London chastened, and became engaged to Cynthia Drassilis mostly out of sympathy for her plight. When she visits him the day after his proposal, she easily talks him into helping her out in her scheme. He meets school head Mr Abney, and is soon signed up as Classics master at Sanstead House, the school to which Mr Ford plans to send Ogden.

At Sanstead, Burns takes up his duties and soon finds his feet with the boys; he also befriends White, the smooth-mannered butler. Ogden Ford arrives a few days later, and a rather shocked Abney requests that Burns discourage his rudeness and smoking. Burns quickly learns that any attempt to kidnap the tempestuous boy will require great skill.

Time passes and Ford introduces numerous vices to the school. In the local inn one day, Burns sees a suspicious-looking American; later, he sees White the butler chasing someone away from the school with a pistol. White explains that he is a detective from the Pinkerton agency, hired by Mr Ford to watch over his son. The following day, another American visits the school, a pleasant man claiming to be a friend of Mr Ford, who soon leaves again having toured the place.

The next evening, Burns is strolling outside when he hears Ogden scream, and a man runs into him, knocking him down. An excited crowd gathers to discuss the incident, a man found breaking into Ogden's room, when Mrs Sheridan appears, for an appointment with Abeny; Burns quickly sees that she is in fact his former fiancée, Audrey. Things are awkward between them at first, but they soon make up. Burns meets the American from the village, who turns out to be Buck MacGinnis, former kidnapper of Ogden, and who thinks Burns is none other than his rival, "Smooth" Sam Fisher. Burns questions White about these men, and learns that while Buck a common hoodlum, Fisher is an educated and dangerously smooth man. Spending more time with Audrey, he realises his love for her is still strong.

One day MacGinnis and his gang raid the school, holding up the masters at gunpoint. MacGinnis takes Burns to search for Ogden, but Burns flees out of the study window. As he is climbing out MacGinnis shoots him, but he makes it to the cover of some bushes. Burns tackles MacGinnis, breaking his leg, and the gang flees without the missing Ogden. Burns frees the rest of the school, and the police are called. Ogden still cannot be found, and a friend is also found to be missing. Burns volunteers to go to London to search for the runaways, and Audrey implores him to search well, saying she will lose her job with Mr Ford if Ogden is not found.

We learn that Burns has bribed Ogden to go to London, and arranged to have his valet send the boy to his mother Nesta Ford. Abney the headmaster, sick in bed with a cold, learns that the butler is a detective and sends him on the trip to London with Burns. On the way White reveals that he saw Burns give Ogden his directions, and also that he is in fact none other than Smooth Sam Fisher, proposing to come in with Burns on the presumed kidnapping job. Burns flees to his flat, but learns that Ogden has not arrived there. Fisher arrives having followed Burns, but on learning Ogden is off enjoying London he leaves to seek him.

After a day's search, Burns finds the boy at the house of his friend's mother, and brings him back to the school. Fisher also returns, threatening to expose Burns' actions if his identity is revealed. Ogden is moved to a safe room, and guarded; Burns' relationship with Audrey chills after he is reminded he is engaged, and he foils another attempt by Fisher to take the boy. The school term ends, but Mr Ford cannot collect Ogden for a few days, so Abney asks Burns to join Audrey and the butler in guarding him, but Fisher reveals Burns' plot to return Ogden to his mother.

Burns leaves in shame, but returns and contacts Audrey to tell her about Fisher. She doesn't trust him, remaining aloof, and he sees MacGinnis is also back in the neighbourhood. He drives Fisher out of the house, and takes guard himself, still without Audrey's faith. Fisher comes back having joined up with MacGinnis, and offers Burns a last chance, which he rejects. With the phone wires cut, Burns tries to sneak Ogden across country, but they are trapped in the loft of the school stables. Ogden, bored of the chase, surrenders himself, and Audrey breaks down in tears, comforted by Burns.

Some days later, Burns and Audrey speak of their love, but she insists he stand by his promise to Cynthia. They part, and Cynthia's mother appears with Nesta Ford. Mr Ford also arrives, as does Sam Fisher, who persuades Ford to reunite with his wife and to take Fisher on as Ogden's security guard, in lieu of a ransom. Ford agrees and they leave. Mrs Drassilis reveals that Cynthia has fallen for Lord Mountry, and Burns gives them his blessing, releasing her from the engagement. He heads off after Audrey.

== Characters in "The Little Nugget" ==
- Ogden Ford, an obnoxious child, a popular target of kidnappers and thus known as The Little Nugget
  - Elmer Ford, Ogden's wealthy and commanding father
  - Mrs Nesta Ford (later Mrs Ford Pett), his doting mother
- Peter Burns, a well-to-do young man, who tries to kidnap Ogden for Mrs Ford
  - Cynthia Drassilis, the ambitious fiancée of Peter Burns
    - Mrs Drassilis, Cynthia's even more ambitious mother
- Audrey Sheridan, Ogden's governess, once Peter Burns's first love
- Arnold Abney, the mild and pompous headmaster of Sanstead
  - Mr Glossop, an irascible master at Sanstead
  - White, butler at Sanstead, soon found to be undercover
  - Mrs Attwell, matron at the school
- "Smooth" Sam Fisher, an intellectual crook who kidnaps Ogden Ford
- Buck MacGinnis, a gang leader and arch rival of Smooth Sam Fisher
- Lord Mountry, a shy and nervous young noble
  - Augustus Beckford, a pupil at Sanstead, cousin of Lord Mountry
- Tankerville Gifford, an unpleasant socialite
- Miss Benjafield, barmaid at local inn the Feathers

== Allusions to other novels ==
Ogden Ford and his mother Nesta appear again in Piccadilly Jim (1918). Arnold Abney is mentioned as a former headmaster of Bertie Wooster in Much Obliged, Jeeves (1971).
