= Tales of St. Austin's =

1903 short story collection by P. G. Wodehouse

- First edition
- Author: P. G. Wodehouse
- Language: English
- Publisher: Adam & Charles Black
- Publication date: 1903

Tales of St. Austin's is a collection of short stories and essays, all with a school theme, by P. G. Wodehouse. It was first published on 10 November 1903 by Adam & Charles Black, London, all except one item having previously appeared in the schoolboy magazines, The Captain and Public School Magazine.

The stories are set in the fictional public school of St. Austin's, which is also the setting for The Pothunters (1902); they revolve around cricket, rugby, petty gambling and other boyish escapades. Several characters in the stories also appear in The Pothunters.

== Contents ==
=== "How Pillingshot Scored" ===
- The Captain, May 1903
  - (reprinted in Greyfriars Holiday Annual, 1926, as "How Pillingshot Scored!")

Plot

Mr Mellish announces that there will be a Livy examination next Saturday, and warns Pillingshot, whose work on Livy has been below par, that anybody who does not get fifty per cent will be severely punished. Pillingshot's friend Parker suggests he study, but Pillingshot dislikes this idea. Later, Parker tells Pillingshot about how another student, Brown, was injured and will be out of school for about a week. Scott, an older boy in the First Eleven (the school's primary cricket players), often makes Pillingshot do things and gets Pillingshot to play some cricket. Venables, of Merevale's House, is the captain of the St Austin's team and tells Scott he needs a player for next Saturday's match against Windybury, on the latter's ground. Brown was supposed to have scored for the team, so they need another player. Pillingshot volunteers. On Saturday morning, Mr Mellish learns Pillingshot will miss the examination because he is going to Windbury to score for the team, and realizes that Pillingshot has already scored.

=== "The Odd Trick" ===
- The Captain, August 1902

Plot

Philip St H. Harrison, of Merevale's, is outwardly genial but makes trouble if he thinks he can get away with it. He makes a noisemaker out of a biscuit tin, some pebbles, and some string, and conceals it. Using the string, he makes noises during the night without being caught for a while, but eventually Tony Graham, a prefect in Merevale's who looks after Harrison's dormitory, catches him and punishes him. A few days later, when Merevale's House plays a cricket match against the School House, Harrison acts as umpire and gives unfair rulings against Tony. Then one morning, Harrison wakes up late for chapel and does not have enough time to change out of his night-shirt, so he grabs a mackintosh and rushes to chapel. After Harrison gets there, Tony says the mackintosh is his and takes it back. Harrison tries to run back into the House without being seen by Merevale, but Merevale is standing nearby along with the Headmaster. Later, Merevale tells Harrison that the Headmaster wishes to see him.

=== "L'Affaire Uncle John (A Story in Letters)" ===
- Public School Magazine, August 1901

Plot

The story is told through letters. Richard Venables, of St Austin's, writes to his brother Archibald Venables, of Cambridge, about his encounter with their uncle John Dalgliesh. Uncle John has just come back from some diamond mines. Richard went to meet Uncle John at the station, and came across a middle-aged man digging holes in the cricket field. Richard insults him, as does the ground-man Biffen. At the station, Richard does not see anyone matching Uncle John's description. Biffen later tells Richard that the man who was digging holes was the man Richard was supposed to meet. Richard supposes Uncle John had been digging from force of habit. Richard's father, Major-General Sir Everard Venables, is worried because he hoped Uncle John would get Richard a job, but now Uncle John is offended. However, Richard does well in a cricket match and impresses Lord Marmaduke Twistleton, who offers Richard a future job on his estate in Scotland because he wants someone who can play cricket. Twistleton wants Richard to play Varsity cricket first, which is exactly what Richard wanted to do. Richard Venables goes on to play well for Oxford.

=== "Harrison's Slight Error" ===
- The Captain, January 1903

Plot

In a train, P. St H. Harrison gets some snacks and leisurely heads to the rear of the train, since his friend Mace promised to keep a seat for him. However, another boy, a stranger, takes the seat Harrison wanted. There is no other vacant seat in the compartment, but the train starts, so Harrison cannot go elsewhere and must stand. The other boys in the compartment are amused and do not let Harrison make the stranger leave his seat. Harrison realizes Mace is not there, because Harrison got into the wrong carriage. Harrison plots his revenge against the stranger, who is a new boy at St Austin's and also in Harrison's house, Merevale's. At the school, Harrison tries to trick the new boy into moving his things into a room that actually belongs to Venables, the head of the house, so the boy will be punished. He tells the stranger to move out the furniture already in the room. Later, Harrison is surprised to see Venables and the stranger at ease with each other. They had emptied the room together as Harrison suggested. Venables introduces the stranger as his brother, and tells Harrison to move all the furniture back.

=== "Bradshaw's Little Story" ===
- The Captain, July 1902

Plot

Frederick Wackerbath Bradshaw, once the narrator's classmate, is deceptive and would be brought to court for committing fraud in later years. The narrator tells the story of one time Bradshaw was caught and punished at school. They are in the Upper Fourth form at St Austin's. Bradshaw prides himself on avoiding work and refuses to study for the upcoming Euripides examination. The narrator tells Bradshaw that Mr Yorke is setting the Euripides paper. The examination occurs, and Bradshaw does badly. Their form-master Mr Mellish is appalled at Bradshaw's marks (four out of a hundred) but Bradshaw is exonerated after speaking to him privately. The narrator and two other boys try to make Bradshaw tell them how he did it, but are interrupted by Mr Prater, their House-master, who tells Bradshaw to see the Headmaster. Bradshaw goes and soon returns, after being punished with a "touching up" (which the narrator explains means corporal punishment). Bradshaw is annoyed with the narrator for telling him that Yorke was setting the paper. Bradshaw had claimed he had seen the Euripides paper in Mr Yorke's classroom but did not realize what it was, and did badly on the exam to not take an unfair advantage. Mellish had believed this, but the Headmaster heard about this and knew Bradshaw was lying because the paper was actually set by the Headmaster himself.

=== "A Shocking Affair" ===
- Previously unpublished, would later appear in Puffin Post, Q2, 1973

Plot

The narrator from "Bradshaw's Little Story" tells another story about Bradshaw. This time, Bradshaw is threatened by a Thucydides examination, which he claims he will be able to avoid. The narrator bets him sixpence that he will have to take it. Mr Mellish is surprised when Bradshaw is indeed not present at the exam. The examination is difficult, and once it is over, the narrator follows Mr Mellish out of the room just to annoy him. Mellish is talking to Monsieur Gerard, the French master, when they all hear Bradshaw shouting from the Science Museum room. They run to the Museum door, which is bolted shut. Bradshaw says from inside the room that he cannot open the door. Gerard gets an electric shock when he touches the handle. The Museum's electric light, which is on, is connected to the bolt on the locked door, and the current has gone wrong somehow. Mellish also tries but fails to open the door. The science and chemistry master Blaize comes and tells Bradshaw to use a piece of paper to shoot back the bolt, because paper does not conduct electricity. Bradshaw does so and opens the door. The Museum is blamed and Bradshaw does not get in trouble. Bradshaw won the narrator's bet. The narrator asks if Bradshaw got a shock when he locked himself in, and Bradshaw explains that he did not because he already knew paper was a non-conductor.

=== "The Babe and the Dragon" ===
- The Captain, February 1902

Plot

Dacre's House and Merevale's House are rivals for the inter-House rugby football cup. The teams are evenly matched, and each want the Scottish student MacArthur, known as the Babe, to join their House and team. The Babe, a skilled rugby player, is a day boy (a student who does not live at the school) but will soon become a boarder and choose a House to join. Miss Florence Beezley, the Dragon, is a friend of the Babe's sister at Girton, and had visited the MacArthur family before the term started. She is extremely learned and enjoyed making MacArthur look ignorant. She asked him about the masters at St Austin's, and he described Mr Merevale as a decent sort but was unflattering about Mr Dacre. At school, Charteris, a prefect in Merevale's House, hears all the school gossip because he runs an unofficial school paper The Glow Worm. He tells the Babe that Dacre is going to be married. The Babe is sent on an errand to Dacre's drawing room, where there is a tea party going on. Miss Beezley is there with Mr Dacre. Charteris soon confirms that Dacre is engaged to Beezley. As a boarder, the Babe will be a House prefect because he is in the Sixth form, and will have to see the House-master often. The Babe joins Merevale's and they win the cup.

=== "The Manoeuvres of Charteris" ===
- The Captain, August & September 1903
  - (reprinted in Greyfriars Holiday Annual, 1927, as "Out of Bounds!")

"The Manoeuvres of Charteris" is significantly longer than the other stories in the collection and was originally published in two parts. In the first edition of Tales of St Austin's, "The Manoeuvres of Charteris" is 81 pages long, while the next longest story, "A Shocking Affair", is 18 pages long.

Plot

In a rugby game between St Austin's and the team of a village called Old Crockford, one of the players for St Austin's, Tony Graham, is injured by an opposing bearded player, the secretary of the Old Crockfordians (or the Bargees, as the Austinians call them). Tony will not be able to play for a month. In retaliation, Charteris, of Merevale's House, consistently throws the ball to the bearded player so that Prescott, the hardest tackler in St Austin's, tackles him. The player blames Charteris and warns he will get revenge. Charteris occasionally goes to the village of Stapleton, which is a mile from St Austin's and off limits to students, for the fun of breaking the rule. Charteris goes to Stapleton to borrow some books from Dr Adamson, for Tony to read while recuperating. In Stapleton, Charteris runs into the secretary of the Old Crockfordians. Charteris admits he did not get permission from Mr Merevale to go to Stapleton. Charteris hurries back to St Austin's but is followed by the secretary. After the man reports him, Charteris reveals he actually had permission to go to Stapleton from Mr Dacre, and the secretary is defeated. Later, "Babe" MacArthur and Charteris run to the hamlet of Worbury for exercise, and while there, they learn about contests to be held at Rutton in a week. Rutton is eight miles from Stapleton and even more out of bounds. Charteris decides he will compete in one of the Rutton races, the strangers' mile.

The Babe, Tony, and Welch, all of Merevale's, try to talk Charteris out of risking being caught in Rutton, especially because Charteris is supposed to play in an important House-match between Merevale's and Dacre's the day after the Rutton sports. Charteris likes breaking rules and goes anyway. The secretary of the Old Crockfordians is also in the race. Charteris pretends he got leave from Mr Dacre again. He comes in second but defeats the secretary, and immediately heads to St Austin's to get back before lock-up. He sees two young men trying to ride a bicycle that obviously belongs to a small woman. Charteris realizes they have stolen this bicycle from the twelve-year-old girl nearby. Charteris fights off the hooligans, then returns the bicycle to its owner. She thanks him and admits she was going to Stapleton without permission, which Charteris sympathizes with. He hurries to meet his train but just misses it. The girl has left on her bicycle. Dr Adamson comes by in a dog-cart (a horse-drawn vehicle) and brings Charteris to the school. The next day, the match between Merevale's and Dacre's occurs, and Merevale's wins. Afterwards, Charteris's fag Crowinshaw tells him that the Headmaster wants to see him. The Headmaster received a letter from someone who saw Charteris at Rutton. The young cyclist, Dorothy, appears. She is the Headmaster's niece, and says Charteris was the person who helped her. The Headmaster reduces Charteris's punishment to ten lines of Virgil. Unofficially, the Headmaster tells Charteris that he thinks they would get along well if Charteris stopped breaking rules just to break them, and they shake hands. Charteris stops breaking school rules.

=== "How Payne Bucked Up" ===
- The Captain, October 1902

Plot

Grey, the captain of St Austin's First Fifteen (the school's primary rugby players) is recovering from a knee injury, so Charles Augustus Walkinshaw is acting as captain. Payne, of Dacre's, is likely to soon get his official First-Fifteen colours. Walkinshaw thinks Payne is overconfident and should be left out for a match or two, so he will try harder when he plays again. Walkinshaw is not actually correct about Payne, but Grey believes Walkinshaw and suggests he put together a First Fifteen v. Second game, with Payne as captain of the Second. Walkinshaw tells Payne that he should buck up and not slack off. Payne plays rigorously, and the match ends in a draw. Two members of the First end up injured because of Payne, and Walkinshaw gets minor injuries, but he is thrilled that Payne has bucked up. Walkinshaw arranges a repeat match to buck up Payne even more for a future match against Windybury. At the following match, Walkinshaw is injured more seriously and admits it was because of Payne. With the four most senior members of the First out of action, Grey makes Payne the captain for the team against Windbury. Grey is annoyed with Walkinshaw, but St Austin's wins. Payne gets his First-Fifteen colours from Grey.

=== "Author!" ===
- Public School Magazine, October 1901

Plot

J. S. M. Babington, of Dacre's House, is disruptive in class, and is told by the new mathematics master Mr Reginald Seymour to report to the classroom the following afternoon to do a set of mathematics examples as punishment. Babington gets a letter from his cousin, a medical student in London, to come see a comedy show. Babington writes to his cousin accepting the invitation. He is relieved to hear Mr Seymour plans to take a train to town in the morning and will not be around to see Babington start on the mathematics exercises. Babington completes these overnight, with help from some friends, and one of these friends will answer for Babington at roll-call. Babington goes to London in the morning and enjoys the show with his cousin. In the afternoon, Babington's cousin suggests they get food somewhere and introduces Babington to another medical student, Richards. Richards brings a friend, who wrote the play. Babington is shocked to see the writer is Mr Seymour. He wrote the play under a pseudonym. Mr Seymour recognizes Babington when Babington's cousin says he is a student at St Austin's. Mr Seymour explains how he knows Babington, and everyone except Babington is amused. However, Babington is not in trouble, since Mr Seymour was only a temporary master and his term of office ceased earlier that day.

=== "The Tabby Terror" ===
- Public School Magazine, February 1902

Plot

Mr Prater's cat, Captain Kettle, starts eating food in the boarding rooms in Prater's House. They cannot do much to stop the cat since it is under Mr Prater's protection. Trentham, the head of the House, is visited by his sister Mrs Williamson, and he asks her to buy the cat from Prater. Mrs Williamson, who has tea with Mrs Prater, likes Captain Kettle on sight and does want to buy him, but is reluctant to make an offer since she just met Mrs Prater. Trentham tells her he will let Mr Prater know that she wants the cat when an opportunity arises. A fortnight later, Trentham attends a supper held by Mr Prater, and learns the cat is in disgrace because he ate the Praters' canary. Mr and Mrs Prater decide they cannot keep the cat. Trentham says that his sister would be glad to take him, and Prater agrees to give Captain Kettle to her. Captain Kettle leaves and can no longer take the students' food.

=== "The Prize Poem" ===
- Public School Magazine, July 1901 (set at St. Martin's College in magazine version)

Plot

In the past, a rich man left an income to St Austin's in his will for an annual prize, for the best poem submitted by a member of the Sixth Form on a subject selected by the Headmaster. Every member of the form must compete. Smith of the Sixth visits Reynolds of the Remove, who is recovering from an illness in the infirmary. Smith complains about being required to write a poem (on the subject of the College), while Reynolds wishes he could compete. He offers to write a poem for Smith, and if it wins the prize, Smith will tell the Headmaster that Reynolds wrote it. Smith agrees. Later, Montgomery of the Sixth, who has difficulty writing poetry like Smith, sees a copy of Reynold's unsigned short poem, blown from the infirmary by the wind. Montgomery takes the poem and adds two lines to it. Another member of the Sixth, Morrison, is brought a copy of the poem by his fag Evans, who also found it near the infirmary. The Headmaster, the Rev. Arthur James Perceval, has his friend Mr Wells judge the poems. Wells writes to him that the poem written by a student named Rogers was the best, and that three of the poems start with the same four lines. The Headmaster questions Smith, Montgomery, and Morrison, who admit they did not write the poem. Smith explains he cannot write poetry at all. The Headmaster understands and lets them go. The rules of the Sixth-Form Poetry Prize are altered so that no one is required to compete.

=== Essays ===
The essays included in the collection were originally published in magazines, and are all light-hearted and comedic in tone.

"Work"

Published in Public School Magazine, December 1900. The writer of the essay advises students to use tricks to avoid Latin and Greek school work, and promotes his great forthcoming work on how to avoid studying. There is some fictional dialogue.

"Notes"

Published in Public School Magazine, February 1901. The essay criticizes the scholarly notes that are often included in publications of classic works.

"Now, Talking About Cricket—"

Public School Magazine, July 1901. Commentary on being a player or spectator of cricket.

"The Tom Brown Question"

Published in Public School Magazine, December 1901. The essay presents criticism of the 1857 novel Tom Brown's School Days in the form of fictional dialogue.

== Publication history ==
In The Captain, T. M. R. Whitwell illustrated "How Pillingshot Scored", "The Odd Trick", "Harrison's Slight Error", "The Babe and the Dragon", "The Manoeuvres of Charteris", and "How Payne Bucked Up". "Bradshaw's Little Story" was illustrated by E. F. Skinner in The Captain.

In Public School Magazine, R. Noel Pocock illustrated "L'Affaire Uncle John" and "The Prize Poem". "The Manoeuvres of Charteris" was illustrated by Saville Lunley in The Greyfriars Holiday Annual.

"Bradshaw's Little Story" and "A Shocking Affair" were included in the collection The Swoop! and Other Stories (1979). "The Prize Poem" was included in the collection The Eighteen-Carat Kid and Other Stories (1980).

"How Pillingshot Scored" was included in the anthology Twenty-Five Cricket Stories, published by George Newnes, London, in 1909. The anthology also included three other short stories by Wodehouse. "How Payne Bucked Up" was included in the anthology Twenty-Five Football Stories, published by George Newnes, London, in 1910. The anthology also included another short story by Wodehouse, the Joan Romney story "Petticoat Influence".

The first edition of Tales of St Austin's contained twelve full-page illustrations by T. M. R. Whitwell, R. Noel Pocock, and E. F. Skinner. The American edition was issued by Macmillan, New York, in December 1903, from imported sheets. The illustration on the front of the first edition dust jacket is from "The Manoeuvres of Charteris", and the illustration on the spine is from "How Pillingshot Scored".

A version of the book published in 1972 by Souvenir Press, London, included an afterword by Colin MacInnes, as with other Souvenir Press editions of some Wodehouse books.

== See also ==
- List of Wodehouse's school short stories
- Tales of Wrykyn and Elsewhere

== References and sources ==
Sources

- McIlvaine, Eileen; Sherby, Louise S.; Heineman, James H. (1990). P. G. Wodehouse: A Comprehensive Bibliography and Checklist. New York: James H. Heineman Inc. ISBN 978-0-87008-125-5.
- Midkiff, Neil. "The Wodehouse short stories". "Neil Midkiff's P. G. Wodehouse pages".
