= The Pothunters =

1902 novel by P. G. Wodehouse

- First edition
- Author: P. G. Wodehouse
- Language: English
- Genre: Comedy novel
- Publisher: Adam & Charles Black
- Publication date: 18 September 1902
- Publication place: United Kingdom
- Media type: Print (hardback & paperback)
- OCLC: 2124818

The Pothunters is a novel by P. G. Wodehouse published on 18 September 1902 by Adam & Charles Black. It was Wodehouse's first published novel, and the first of several school stories, this one set at the fictional public school of St. Austin's. It was originally published as a serial in the British magazine Public School Magazine from January to March 1902. An American edition was issued from imported sheets.

The novel follows the lives of several of the schoolboys as they study, take part in their school sports (particularly boxing and running), and enjoy tea in their studies. After two of the school's silver sports trophies ('pots' in contemporary slang) are stolen in a burglary, the boys, their masters, and the police join in the hunt for the 'pots'.

Several characters in the novel also appear in stories about St. Austin's published in the short story collection Tales of St. Austin's (1903).

== Plot ==
Tony Graham, of the Sixth form at St Austin's, narrowly defeats his cousin Allen Thomson, of Rugby, in boxing at the inter-school sports at Aldershot. Tony returns to St Austin's with Welch, another athlete. Tony's fag Robinson excitedly tells them that a window pane was removed from the Pavilion, where the school sports trophies are temporarily being kept. Robinson thinks the trophies have been stolen. Tony later sees Jim Thomson, Allen's brother who attends St Austin's. Jim bet two pounds on Allen at Aldershot, with Allen betting against himself to hedge another bet. Jim now needs two pounds to pay Allen. Jim's father will pay Jim a pound for every race he wins at St Austin's. He has already won the half-mile and hopes to win the mile. Thanks to Robinson, news quickly spreads about the burglary. Only two trophies (for the quarter-mile and hundred-yard races) and a valueless flask were taken. Jim tells Tony that on the night of the burglary, he broke into the Pavilion because he had left notes there which he needed to study for an examination. At the time, he heard someone jump out through a different window. Jim now realizes he interrupted a burglary. He worries about what will happen if it is discovered that he was in the Pavilion at the time of the burglary.

Dallas and Vaughan share a study with Plunkett, the patronizing head of their House. They tell MacArthur, a day-boy, how much they dislike Plunkett. Welch shares a study with Charteris, who runs an unofficial school magazine, The Glow Worm. His identity as its editor is only known to the magazine's contributors: Welch, Tony, Jim, and Jackson. Charteris jokingly suggests that Welch, who is likely to win the missing trophies, stole them, but Welch says he does not compete solely for trophies (see pothunter). Jackson says that two pounds were stolen from a blazer in the Pavilion. Another student, Barrett, trespasses on the land of Sir Alfred Venner to collect bird eggs. He discovers the stolen trophies in a poacher's hideout in a hollow tree. A groundskeeper chases Barrett away and comes across Plunkett, who also trespassed. Barrett runs into Roberts, a detective investigating the burglary. Barrett does not want to get caught trespassing and does not mention seeing the trophies.

A schoolmaster, Mr Thompson, takes an interest in investigating the burglary. Roberts tells Thompson that the culprit was not a professional, since the window pane was not cut neatly. Furthermore, only someone connected with the school could have known the trophies were being kept there temporarily. Thompson later opens a letter addressed to "J. Thomson", mistaking the name as his own. The letter is from Allen telling Jim that he needs two pounds right away. After Jim is narrowly defeated in the mile race, Charteris proposes publishing a special issue of The Glow Worm about the burglary and sports to earn the money Jim needs. The Headmaster and Mr Thompson accuse Jim of the burglary, though Jim denies it. After Sir Alfred complains about Plunkett smoking a pipe on his land, the Headmaster has Plunkett removed from the school, delighting Dallas and Vaughan.

Jim goes with MacArthur to MacArthur's family's house nearby. Roberts tells the Headmaster that he has found the burglar. After a man named Stokes, who was drunk, bumped into Roberts and dropped nearly two pounds, Roberts showed a photograph of him to Biffen, the school ground-man. Biffen identified him as someone who worked on the school grounds. Stokes confessed that he took the trophies and hoped to sell them. He is a poacher and kept them in his hiding place. Roberts advises the Headmaster to ask Sir Alfred to search the hideout, and discourages him from prosecuting Stokes, since Stokes is now scared off crime. That night, Jim is not in his House. The Headmaster fears Jim ran away as a result of being accused of the burglary, and has Mr Merevale and other housemasters send their prefects to search for him. Charteris and Tony learn from Biffen that Jim went to MacArthur's home. They find and rescue Jim, who fell in a quarry on his way back. Barrett decides to admit that he saw the trophies, but changes his mind when he sees they have been returned and awarded to Welch. Charteris and his friends stay up late to finish the special issue of The Glow Worm. It sells well, earning Jim his pound, though Jim forgot to write anything for the issue.

== Characters ==
Students at St Austin's:

- Tony Graham, a prefect in Merevale's House at St Austin's and cousin of Jim and Allen Thomson
- Jim Thomson, the brother of Allen Thomson and a prefect in Merevale's House
- J. George Welch, a student who shares a study with Charteris in Merevale's
- Charteris, a prefect in Merevale's nicknamed "the Alderman" who edits the unofficial monthly school magazine, The Glow Worm
- Barrett, a collector of bird eggs who shares a study with Reade in Philpott's House
- Plunkett, the unpopular head of Ward's House who shares a study with Vaughan and Dallas, and whom they jokingly call "the Mutual Friend"
- Robert MacArthur, a day-boy nicknamed "the Babe"
- Jackson, a contributor to The Glow Worm in Dawson's House
- Reginald Robinson, Tony Graham's fag in Merevale's House

St Austin's staff and other characters:

- Biffen, the ground-man at St Austin's
- Mr John Thompson, the master of the Sixth form
- Mr Merevale, a housemaster at St Austin's, coaches the House rugby and cricket
- The Rev. Herbert Perceval, M.A., the headmaster of St. Austin's College
- Sir Alfred Venner, M.P., the owner of Badgwick Hall and nearby land
- Detective Inspector Roberts, a detective from Scotland Yard
- Stokes, an odd-job worker, farmhand, and poacher

== Publication history ==
The story was originally published as a serial in Public School Magazine, with illustrations by R. Noel Pocock. The serial commenced in January 1902 and the second part appeared in the February 1902 issue, but when the magazine ceased publication in March that year, the remainder of the plot was summarised at the end of the third part of the serial, in the form of a letter from one of the characters, Jim Thomson, to his brother Allen. Jim's statements in the letter are not entirely consistent with the ending of the novel. For instance, he claims he wrote nearly all of the special issue for The Glow Worm.

The American edition of the novel was issued by Macmillan, New York, from imported sheets, in September 1902. Macmillan reissued the novel again from imported sheets in 1924.

The Pothunters is dedicated to Joan, Effie and Ernestine Bowes-Lyon, first cousins to Queen Elizabeth the Queen Mother.

The novel was collected in The Pothunters and Other School Stories, published by Penguin Books in 1986. The book also included A Prefect's Uncle and Tales of St. Austin's.

== Annotations ==
The advance of technology has made part of the story opaque to the modern reader. "On Sunday we jellygraph it", writes Wodehouse without explanation. Jellygraph was a method of making a limited number of copies, about 20 to 80, from a master copy written with a special type of pencil containing jellygraph pigment. These special pencils are referred to in the story: "How many jelly machine things can you raise?" The master copy—on paper—was placed face down in a pan whose bottom was covered in a special gelatin, to which the pigment was transferred as a mirror image. The copies were then made one at a time by placing blank sheets of paper onto the gelatin after the master copy was removed. Although a reasonably simple, if slow, method, the copy produced had text (and figures) in a pale coloured ink that was hard to read.

In chapter 11, one of the characters quotes a Latin phrase (attributing it to Thucydides):

Conscia mens recti, nec si sinit esse dolorem sed revocare gradum.

This is a joke: Thucydides wrote in Greek, not Latin (as Wodehouse would have expected the reader to know) and the quoted phrase is in fact a mixture of lines from Ovid and Virgil.

== Disambiguation ==
- There is also a short story "The Pot-Hunters" (1907) by Rex Beach. A copy exists in The Internet Archive: Rex Beach's The Pot-Hunters
