= Public School Magazine =

British children's magazine

Public School Magazine was a short-lived magazine for boys. It was started in 1898 by publishing company Adam and Charles Black and appeared monthly until March 1902, when it ceased publication, the copyright being sold to rival publisher George Newnes, who had in the meantime founded his own magazine for boys, The Captain.

It is perhaps best known for printing several early school stories by P. G. Wodehouse, such as many of those collected in the 1903 collection, Tales of St. Austin's. When the magazine ceased publication in March 1902, it was part-way through serialisation of Wodehouse's first published novel, The Pothunters (1902). The second half of the story was summarised in the final issue, in the form of a letter from one of the main characters, describing the denouement of the plot to his brother. A & C Black subsequently published the entire novel in book form.
