= The Man Upstairs (short story collection) =

1914 collection of nineteen short stories by P. G. Wodehouse

First edition

The Man Upstairs is a collection of nineteen short stories by P. G. Wodehouse, first published in the United Kingdom on 23 January 1914 by Methuen & Co., London. Most of the stories had previously appeared in magazines, generally Strand Magazine in the UK and Cosmopolitan or Collier's Weekly in the United States. Although the book was not published in the US, many of the stories were eventually made available to US readers in The Uncollected Wodehouse (1976) and The Swoop! and Other Stories (1979).

It is a miscellaneous collection, not featuring any of Wodehouse's regular characters; most of the stories concern love and romance.

== Contents ==
=== "The Man Upstairs" ===
- UK: Strand, March 1910 (UK setting)
- US: Cosmopolitan, March 1910 (as "The Man Up-stairs", US setting)

Plot

Annette Brougham, a quick-tempered female composer and music-teacher, is disturbed by a knocking on her ceiling. She visits the flat above to complain, but despite her initial feelings of anger towards him, she soon finds herself drawn to "Alan Beverley", the modest and charming struggling artist she finds there. Alan invites her to knock on the ceiling whenever she wants to talk to him.

Reginald Sellers, another resident of the building, a pompous and self-important painter, criticises Alan's work harshly, and Annette defends him, but regrets her cruelty towards Reginald. The boorish Sellers finds some success with his art, selling several paintings to a Glasgow millionaire named Bates, and continues to lord it over his less high-achieving neighbour.

Annette publishes a waltz she has written, and that too begins to sell surprisingly well. She is happy, but disappointed that her friend has yet to sell his work, and upset that Sellers still criticises him.

She answers the communal telephone one day, and takes a message from a friend of "Beverley" who is borrowing his flat, and hears that large quantities of printed music and several bad paintings have been delivered there. She confronts "Beverley", who reveals that his real name is Bill Bates, a Glasgow millionaire. He has been in love with Annette since he first saw her in the street, and took the flat in her building to be near her, banging on the floor to get her attention; he now wants her to marry him.

She berates him for tricking her and treating her like a child, and he counters by revealing that he knows she has bought his one and only painting, a mediocre portrait of a Child and a Cat, through an intermediary. He repeats his proposal of marriage, and she tells him to go away. She hears him pacing around in his room above, and, taking a broom, she bangs three times on her ceiling.

=== "Something to Worry About" ===
- UK: Strand, February 1913 (source for this book)
- US: Metropolitan, March 1913

Plot

Sally Preston, a London girl born and bred, is found to be an aficionado of the movies by her father, who disapproves of such entertainments, and is sent to stay with an aunt at a small, sleepy seaside village in Hampshire. She tells her story to Tom Kitchener, a simple young gardener next door, who promptly falls in love with her. So too do most of the other young men of the village, who begin to visit the house in increasing numbers.

Tom, too shy to visit and jealous of the men who do, decides to shower her with gifts; it being autumn and all the flowers gone, all he has to shower with are vegetables, which he proceeds to give generously. Her aunt's husband warns him off, but he rebels, proposes to her awkwardly, and is amazed to find himself accepted.

Tom buys her a puppy, and she soon finds herself in trouble with the local constable, for failing to put a collar on the dog. Trying to persuade Tom to take revenge on the man for her, she reveals that she has accepted proposals of marriage from several other local men, in a scheme to force her father to take her back to London, but she is worried by Tom's quiet responses.

He takes her along to the first of her other suitors, and fights him. Tom wins, despite the other man's greater size, and Sally is moved. He takes her along to the second, and fights him. Tom wins, despite the other's greater skill; Sally is smitten by Tom. He takes her along to the third, who denounces Sally. Tom tells her she will marry him, and she concurs. The story ends with Sally comparing the day's events with a movie she is fond of.

Sally's father appears to be a neighbour of Bowles, also an ex-butler turned landlord in London's Ebury Street.

=== "Deep Waters" ===
- US: Collier's Weekly, 28 May 1910 (reset at Ocean Bay in U.S.)
- UK: Strand, June 1910 (source for this book)

Plot

George Barnert Callender, playwright and an excellent swimmer, is at Marvis Bay for the production of his play Fate's Footballs, shortly to be put on there. He is on the pier, dwelling on the play's troubles, particularly its star Arthur Mifflin, when he sees a very attractive girl in the water. Straining to follow her as she swims beneath him, he falls from the pier, and is just about to swim off when she grasps him and begins to drag him to shore. He lets her do this, hoping to form an acquaintanceship, and on the shore they meet and she offers to teach him to swim.

They meet again later, and he learns her name is Mary Vaughan, staying at the same hotel as George with an aunt. Next day, the troupe arrive to perform George's play, and Mifflin, full of ideas to promote the piece, heads out on a boat trip with George. Explaining it is a stunt to attract attention to the play, Mifflin upsets the boat, expecting George to drag him to safety. George refuses, however, as it would spoil things with Mary, and makes Mifflin to pretend to be the rescuer.

Mary's suspicions are aroused by the repeat rescuing, and recalls having seen George before, swimming strongly at another resort. She is furious with him, but Mifflin explains George's initial gallantry and reluctance to repeat the act, and all is forgiven.

Later, with George's play a success in London, he is accompanied into his box by a lady...

=== "When Doctors Disagree" ===
- UK: Strand, December 1910 (source for this book)
- US: Success, March 1911 (relocated to U.S. setting)

Plot

Arthur Welch is a barber at the Hotel Belvoir. He is engaged to Maud Peters, who is a manicurist at the same hotel. While she takes care of her customers' hands, Maud thinks, as part of her profession, that she must chat gaily with them. Arthur, who is extremely jealous, thinks otherwise. One day he no longer seems jealous, which at first makes Maud happy though she soon worries he no longer cares about her.

She decides to take advice from Doctor Cupid, who answers questions on Matters of the Heart in the weekly magazine Fireside Chat. Dr Cupid advises her to try to pique her fiancé. And this is what she does with a bold young American pugilist, known as 'Skipper" Shute. But surprisingly, Arthur does not seem to care a bit about the badinage going on between his fiancée and the pugilist. Mr Shute invites Maud to meet him in the White City area of London, but Maud says she already plans to go with Arthur there.

After the shop is closed, Arthur brings Maud to the White City, and Maud is still disappointed in Arthur's blithe attitude. There they unexpectedly meet Mr Shute, who succeeds in losing Arthur and finding himself alone with Maud. When he tries to kiss her, Arthur, who has come back, provokes Mr Shute into a fight. He even gives him a blow on the head, causing Mr Shute's silk top hat to fall on the ground. Mr Shute runs after his hat, but, when he comes back with it, ready to show Arthur what a real pugilist is, a very large constable has appeared on the scene, and ask the contestants to stop creating trouble on the street.

While they move away, fully reconciled with each other, Arthur shows Maud a paper clipping, from the magazine Home Moments, where, in answer to his request, the Heart Specialist has written that Arthur should show no resentment to her fiancée, whenever he sees her flirting with other men.

=== "By Advice of Counsel" ===
- UK: Strand, July 1910 (source for this book)
- US: Pictorial Review, September 1910 (longer version set in U.S.)

Plot

A traveller eating in a restaurant pays no attention to an altercation in progress between a waiter, Jack Roach, and a customer, Lord Percy, at the other end of the room. The waiter stops by the traveller anyway to complain to him that if Lord Percy meant lamb, he should have said "lamb" distinctly, and not "ham", which Jack thought he said. Jack tells the silent traveller the following story.

Jack and his friend "Gentleman" Bailey don't want to work, so they live off Gentleman's rich friend Jerry Moore. Jerry, who happens to be hard of hearing, is a bachelor and happy to have them in his house because he admires Gentleman. But soon Jerry introduces them to the girl he is in love with, Jane Tuxton, a tough-looking girl who would definitely have Jack and Gentleman out of the house. Gentleman thinks hopefully that Jane is becoming displeased with Jerry because Jerry is meek.

Jerry goes to have supper with Jane and her family, and Jack and Gentleman insist on joining him, to Jane's displeasure. Jerry is also diffident towards Jane's family. Gentleman is pleased, saying that the only way for a man to win over the spirited Jane Tuxton is to be assertive and rude to her family. Jerry worries Jane is thinking badly of him, but Gentleman assures him nothing is wrong, and suggests he flatter Jane's family by asking them for advice, telling him to "consult her folks". However, at the next supper with Jane's family, Jerry is rude to her family, which results in him winning over Jane. Jack's story ends with Jerry thanking Gentleman for advising him to "insult her folks".

Jack leans on the traveller's table and asks for sympathy, but the traveller says he does not know what he is saying and to write it down if it is important, because he is completely deaf.

=== "Rough-Hew Them How We Will" ===
- UK: Strand, April 1910 (UK Setting)
- US: Cosmopolitan, August 1910 (US Setting)

Plot

Paul Boielle is a waiter at Bredin's Parisian Cafe and Restaurant. He also paints and hopes to sell his masterpiece in order to marry his co-worker Jeanne Le Brocq and buy a cigar shop. Jeanne is a slow worker, and one day Paul finds Jeanne sobbing because their boss, Monsieur Bredin, called her a tortoise. Paul puts an arm part of the way round her waist and talks to her affectionately, but she angrily throws off his hand, saying that he could not support a wife on his salary. She is mollified when he tells her he is planning to sell his masterpiece, "The Awakening", a woodland scene with a young shepherd stooping to kiss beautiful girl. He assures her it will sell. She tells him in a patronizing way that he might be right.

Paul tries unsuccessfully to sell his painting. Bredin gives Jeanne a compliment and taps her under the chin, which enrages Paul. He throws bread rolls at Bredin, who fires Paul. He expects Jeanne to be touched by his heroism, but she is upset with him for losing his job. Later, Paul is depressed and thinks he should kill himself. He goes into the street planning to get hit by a car but the car stops, and the driver, a young man, steps out and comforts Paul. Paul tells him his problems, and the young man invites him to come along to his hotel.

The next morning, the young man examines the painting, and says the stooping man in the picture would be perfect for advertisements for braces (US: suspenders), specifically Galloway's Tried and Proven, of which he is general manager. He buys it and hires Paul as an advertising artist. Paul happily embraces the young man. That afternoon, Paul has lunch at the cafe. Bredin tries to have Constable Thomas Parsons remove him, saying Paul has no money to lunch there, but Paul reveals this is not the case. Jeanne is excited to see Paul's money and starts saying how glad she is, but Paul meets her glance coolly and simply asks for a cigarette.

=== "The Man Who Disliked Cats" ===
- UK: Strand, May 1912 (source for this book)
- US: Ladies' Home Journal, January 1916 (extensively rewritten as "The Fatal Kink in Algernon")

Plot

At a cafe, the narrator meets a melancholy-looking Frenchman named Jean Priaulx, who dislikes cats and recounts the following story about when he was a young artist in Paris. Priaulx is dependent on his uncle, proprietor of the prestigious Hotel Jules Priaulx. His uncle decides he should earn his living as a cashier at the hotel. Priaulx hates working there. He is especially annoyed by an American woman's cat, named Alexander, since the American frequently exhibits the cat to him. One day Priaulx loses his temper and throws the cat. His uncle fires him, but leaves him with some money.

Priaulx decides to plead for his job back. He returns to the hotel and engages a room. At night, Priaulx hears a voice saying "Move and I shoot!" and shouts for assistance. Hotel officials run up, and they all see the voice is coming from a parrot. The parrot's owner is a beautiful and kind lady, Marion Henderson, with whom Priaulx falls in love. He befriends her rich father, who invites him to visit them in London. By complimenting the hotel, Priaulx convinces his uncle to provide enough money for a trip to London.

In London, Priaulx has a rival, Captain Bassett. Bassett purchases the cat Alexander for Marion. Priaulx opens the parrot's cage, hoping the cat will attack the parrot and so lose Marion's favour. (The original narrator disapproves of this plan, thinking it unfair to the parrot.) Later, Mr Henderson says that he found the cat looking startled while the parrot was telling him not to move or he would shoot, so no fight occurred.

Priaulx next steals the cat, and tries to have it brought to the Cats' House and have it destroyed, but that doesn't happen and Bassett finds the cat there. Priaulx's name is on the box the cat was sent in. Marion chucks Priaulx and marries Captain Bassett. Priaulx adds that his uncle got him a job as an assistant to a man of letters. Priaulx still holds this post, and must now assist in writing a History of the Cat in Ancient Egypt.

=== "Ruth in Exile" ===
- UK: Strand, July 1912 (source for this book)
- US: Ainslee's, August 1912 (slightly rewritten with American characters in France)

Plot

In France, Ruth Warden is the unhappy secretary of pawnbroker Monsieur Gandinot. She lives in Roville-sur-Mer with her father, Eugene Warden, because Mr Warden pestered a brother-in-law for loans and agreed to leave England in return for an allowance. Gandinot, a kind man with a funny-looking appearance, is sympathetic, though Ruth's father is oblivious that she is not happy. On the Promenade des Anglais, a fight breaks out between Mr Warden's dog and other dogs. A rich-looking, gregarious young man, George Vince, breaks up the fight. He flirts with Ruth, whom he has seen before, and says he hopes to marry her, though she is unreceptive. Mr Warden, hoping for a rich son-in-law, invites George to spend time with them.

Ruth comes to find George interesting, but is still cool towards him. George says they would make a good pair because they are both spirited and would enjoy quarreling. He shows her a clever sketch he drew of her, which Ruth appreciates, though she does not say so. At the pawn shop, Ruth, who assumed George is rich, is surprised to overhear George pawning a silver cigarette case. It occurs to her that was prejudiced against George because she does not want to marry for money, especially since her father wants her to marry a rich man. That barrier is now gone and she loves George.

She tells her father that George is poor, and Mr Warden is appalled. Thinking of George's apparent financial difficulties, Ruth starts sobbing, just as George appears with chocolates for her. He rushes to her side, and after Mr Warden states what Ruth overheard, George explains that he went to the pawn shop to study Gandinot. George's father, of Vince's Stores, wants ideas for children's toys, and George found inspiration in Gandinot's amusing appearance. Mr Warden is appeased. Later, Ruth asks George not to use Gandinot's image, since he has been kind to her, and George agrees. He confesses that, despite what he said about quarreling, he will always do what she asks, and hopes that will not make things too dull for her.

=== "Archibald's Benefit" ===
- UK: Pearson's, July 1909 (as "Reginald's Record Knock", similar story with cricket setting)
- US: Collier's Weekly, 19 March 1910 (source for this book; first Wodehouse golf story)

Plot

The unnamed narrator, a competent golfer, explains that Archibald Mealing is an enthusiastic but untalented golfer who nonetheless won a championship, and tells the following story. Archibald belongs to the Cape Pleasant Club. The members, who live in New York but play in New Jersey, are easygoing and avoid quick-moving, serious golfers. The club secretary, chartered accountant McCay, congratulates Archie on his engagement to Margaret Milsom. McCay tells fellow member Sigsbee that he fears Miss Milsom will be disappointed by Archie's performance at their upcoming competition. McCay suggests they give Archie a benefit and let him win. The other participants will agree since everyone likes Archie. Sigsbee reminds him about Gossett, an unpopular member and serious golfer who won't agree, and suggests they upset Gossett's nerves so he will play badly.

Margaret's mother has a low opinion of Archie. Stuyvesant, Margaret's brother, listens sympathetically to Mrs Milsom complain, in return for a sort of allowance. Margaret seems very poetic and soulful, and Archie, with difficulty, reads poetry to impress her. At the tournament, Archie is pleased to find himself doing well. The final round is scheduled for Thursday. Archie is sure Gossett will defeat him quickly so he arranges with Margaret to see her Thursday afternoon.

Thursday comes, and Sigsbee offers to caddie for Gossett. Gossett is doing well when a telegraph boy approaches with a message for him, though Sigsbee refuses to give it to Gossett, claiming that Gossett must focus on the game. Gossett, a Wall Street broker, is worried about the message and starts playing badly. The telegraph boy returns with more telegrams for Gossett, which Sigsbee refuses to give to him. Archibald is doing comparatively well, and though he too becomes anxious when he sees he is late for his rendezvous with Margaret, he manages to win. Immediately Gossett reads the telegrams. All seven say: "Good luck. Hope you win. McCay."

Archibald rushes to see Margaret, and claims he is late because he had an accident. However, Stuyvesant saw Archibald that morning and says this is not true. Archibald admits he was playing golf, and Margaret says he should have told her. She enjoys playing golf, and was afraid to tell Archibald because he seemed so spiritual and poetic. She had pretended to like poetry for Archibald. Archibald explains he did the same for her. Despite Mrs Milsom's disapproval, Archibald cheerfully talks with Margaret about golf and his victory.

=== "The Man, the Maid and the Miasma" ===
- UK: Grand, February 1910 (source for this book)
- US: Cosmopolitan, June 1910 (set in U.S.)

Plot

In London, Master Roland Bean, the supercilious, disapproving Miasma, wants his job as office-boy back after being fired by Robert Ferguson. Bean waits in the outer office, and Ferguson lingers at his desk, not wishing to face Bean again. Eventually, Ferguson tries to rush out past Bean, but it is twenty minutes after seven, and the porter locked up the building at seven. Bean starts trying to persuade Ferguson to reconsider his dismissal.

Ferguson dashes from the room and up the stairs, where he sees a light coming from Mr Blaythwayt's office. Inside, however, is only Mr Blaythwayt's secretary, a girl whom Ferguson used to have a relationship with. Their parting eighteen months prior had been unpleasant. Ferguson informs her they are locked in. She is prepared for such an event, and has cake and cocoa ready. Ferguson proudly insists he doesn't want cake or cocoa, though this is untrue, and he fears hunger will soon overcome his pride.

Ferguson explains he is avoiding Bean, who is too disapproving, and she points out that Ferguson was disapproving of her when she wanted to go on the stage, which led to their separation. They argue, and she goes to bring Bean to the room. Ferguson flees to his office. Time passes and Ferguson becomes hungry enough to grovel to her. But at that moment, she comes with cake and cocoa, having been annoyed too much by Bean. She and Ferguson express sympathy for each other. Ferguson acknowledges he judged her for going on the stage, and has now become less judgmental. She too has changed, since she is now more humble.

Bean appears, and at his suggestion, Ferguson telephones the police to help them out of the building. Ferguson thinks it must be four in the morning, but Bean reveals it is only half past ten. Ferguson asks the girl to supper. Later, she asks what Ferguson will do regarding Bean, and says that they wouldn't have reunited if not for him. Ferguson decides he will get Bean a job with a firm in Edinburgh, far away from London.

=== "The Good Angel" ===
- UK: Strand, February 1910 (UK Setting)
- US: Cosmopolitan, February 1910 (as "The Matrimonial Sweepstakes") (US Setting)

The US version "The Matrimonial Sweepstakes" features the first appearance in print of the name of Lord Emsworth.

Plot

Martin Rossiter is staying at the country home of his friends Mr and Mrs Keith. He has long been in love with their daughter Elsa Keith. He happily spends time with her until a rival appears in the form of the poet Aubrey Barstowe. The Keiths' dignified butler Keggs advises Martin not to try to stop Elsa from listening to Barstowe read poetry. He claims that she is spirited and would stick to Barstowe if opposed, but she will tire of his poetry eventually if Martin does not interfere.

Keggs has a financial interest in the matter. For some years, a matrimonial sweepstake has been held in the servant's hall at each house party, with the names of the gentlemen in the party being placed in a hat and drawn. If Elsa gets engaged to a member of the party, the pool goes to the drawer of the name. The money remains in the pool if she does not get engaged, so the pool has become considerably large. This time, Keggs drew Martin's name.

When Elsa and Barstowe go for a drive the next day, Keggs bribes the chauffeur to have car trouble and leave them stranded for a while, so Elsa will have to listen to Barstowe read more poetry. Martin disapproves of Keggs's underhanded scheming, but Keggs says he hopes Martin will come to look on him as his good angel. Despite listening to several poems after the car trouble, Elsa still likes Barstowe's poetry.

The next day, Elsa and Barstowe are missing, and it is late in the day when Keggs finally says that they may have visited the island on a nearby lake and somehow got marooned there. Elsa and Barstowe are rescued. Two nights and a day pass. Barstowe goes to London, and Elsa is thankful. She hates Barstowe's poetry after hearing much of it on the island. She now prefers Martin.

=== "Pots o' Money" ===
- UK: Strand, December 1911 (source for this book)
- US: Metropolitan, February 1912 (set in U.S.)

Plot

Owen Bentley, employee of the London and Suburban Bank, wishes to marry Audrey Sheppherd, but her father has forbidden it because Owen does not have enough money. Mr Sheppherd prohibits Audrey from seeing Owen again, so Owen and Audrey talk frequently on the telephone. Owen wants to make money but does not know how. He once hoped to find success dramatizing a sentimental novel called White Roses by Edith Butler. He sent her his dramatization, but never heard back from her.

Over the telephone, Audrey tells Owen that a dramatized version of White Roses is running at the Piccadilly Theatre. Audrey thinks Edith Butler stole Owen's work. Owen finds it hard to believe that an author of sentimental novels would do such a thing. Audrey urges him to see the play and find out.

Before doing so, Owen enjoys his annual holiday in the Shropshire village where he spent his boyhood, at the house of an old acquaintance Mr Dorman. Owen has his fortune told by Dorman's mother. Mrs Dorman sees "pots o' money" in Owen's future, and also predicts that Mr Prosser, a temperamental, black-bearded writer of sociology books also staying with Mr Dorman, will get engaged and marry within the year, though Prosser strongly disagrees.

Back at the bank, Owen forgets to stamp some envelopes. Prosser comes to the bank to complain that Vera Delane, his new fiancée, has had to pay for unstamped envelopes. Owen is thrilled that Prosser is engaged, since his own fortune may become true. Prosser is sorry for being temperamental before and invites Owen to dinner after Owen goes to the theatre. At Audrey's insistence, Owen finally sees the play, and discovers that it is his dramatization. He later tells Prosser about it and asks for his advice. Prosser reveals that Edith Butler is his pseudonym. He claims that he did not know who wrote the dramatization, which had no name on it and the letter with it blew away. The play has not been successful in London, but has been very successful in America, so Owen will receive pots o' money.

=== "Out of School" ===
- US: Ainslee's, September 1909 (considerably shorter version set in U.S.)
- UK: Strand, October 1910 (source for this book)

Plot

Before telling the following story, the narrator states that James Datchett should not have done what he did, but notes that there were extenuating circumstances. James wants to be an author, but is reliant on his uncle Frederick Knott, who made his fortune keeping sheep in Western Australia and wants James to do the same. A compromise is reached that James will work as an assistant master at Harrow House, a private school run by Mr Blatherwick. If James can hold onto the job, he can remain in England and write in his spare time, but if he fails, he will be sent away to work in Australia.

James is excited to learn that the editor of the Universal Magazine accepted his short story, and in his elation, gives a brotherly kiss to Violet, a friendly housemaid. The narrator says that this was wrong, though Violet was not bothered since in her life kissing is a normal form of greeting. A young foreigner named Adolf, who works cheaply for the school for the opportunity to learn English, saw James kiss Violet. He is able to use this information to blackmail James into giving him private English lessons, since James is afraid of being sent to Australia to keep sheep if he loses his job.

Adolf attempts to make James give him additional night classes, which pushes James too far, and he kicks Adolf. Adolf leaves and James fears he will lose his job. Meanwhile, Mr Blatherwick receives good news. His wife's brother, who until now just borrowed money from Blatherwick, recommended the school to a friend who is paying for his three sons to attend the school. Blatherwick is pleasantly surprised, and caught up in his joy, he gives Violet a fatherly kiss, just as James walks in. James does not say anything about it, to Blatherwick's relief.

The following day, Blatherwick tells James he dismissed Adolf, who had tried to get James fired by telling Blatherwick a story about James kissing Violet. James will get to keep his job and stay in England.

=== "Three From Dunsterville" ===
- UK: Strand, August 1911 (source for this book)
- US: Pictorial Review, August 1912 (slightly longer version; characters originally from Illinois)

Plot

Mary Hill recently came to New York from the small town of Dunsterville, Canada. She was excited at first, but is now having trouble finding a job. Eddy Moore, a friend from Dunsterville who found success in New York, finds her a job as secretary for Joe Rendal, who is also from Dunsterville. Joe used to be shy and stare adoringly at Mary from afar, but has been changed by New York. He is now confident, better-looking, and uninterested in Mary.

Mary is indignant that Joe, who used to worship her, now only treats her like an insignificant employee. Eddy, on the other hand, is friendly and supportive. Joe tells Mary that Eddy is crooked, but Mary does not believe him. She catches Joe giving her a look of adoration, which surprises her since she thought his feelings had changed.

At lunch, Eddy offers to pay Mary for a copy of one of Joe's letters. She is shocked that Eddy really is dishonest. Joe appears, and claims to have accidentally sent Eddy a letter meant for someone else, though Joe actually did this on purpose so that Eddy would try to make a deal with Mary. Eddy quickly leaves. Joe explains that Eddy was hoping to obtain profitable information about John Longwood, who occasionally informs Joe about his activity on the market a day or so in advance.

Joe confesses to Mary that, though he has been changed by New York in other ways, he still loves her, and had only been pretending that his feelings had changed. He recalls that Mary didn't care about him in the old days, but she smiles at him and tells him that New York has changed her, too.

=== "The Tuppenny Millionaire" ===
- UK: Strand, October 1912

Plot

George Albert Balmer inherits a thousand pounds. He works for the Planet Insurance Company, and another employee, Harold Flower, tries to borrow a sovereign from George, who refuses. Harold claims George is afraid to use his new money and will just draw a little each year from Consuls (government bonds). George is offended, especially because he had actually been planning to invest in Consuls, so he tells Harold he is going to Monte Carlo.

George remains in Monte Carlo long enough to send a postcard to Harold, then goes to nearby Roville, a cheaper resort. While enjoying the sights, he finds a novel, which has a name inside, Julia Waveney. She comes up to him and thanks him for finding her book. George falls in love with her. He learns from a newspaper that there is a Lady Julia Waveney staying nearby.

Feeling someone with a title would never marry an insurance clerk, George forgets his troubles playing boule at the casino. He sees Julia, who smiles at him and hands him five francs, telling him to bet it on eight. Blinded by emotion, he unknowingly places it on three. Eight wins, but the croupier does not award George, so for Julia's sake, George takes the two louis he thought he won and flees. He is chased by a crowd, but they slow each other down and he escapes.

A day later, he finds Julia and holds out the two louis for her, telling the older lady with Julia that he met her at the casino. The older lady, who is really Lady Julia, is displeased and leaves. The girl is Lady Julia's companion, and just lost her job, since she had promised Lady Julia not to go to the casino without her. George is sorry, though she says she had actually wanted to leave the job, but didn't have the nerve. She wants to join her brother in Canada. George asks her to marry him and go to Canada with him. She puts her hand in his and looks at him affectionately. She then asks what his name is.

=== "Ahead of Schedule" ===
- UK: Grand, November 1910 (source for this book)
- US: Collier's Weekly, 28 January 1911 (set in New York)

Plot

Rollo Finch asks his valet James Wilson if he has ever been in love, and Wilson says yes, though it came to nothing. Rollo tells Wilson he must have gone about it the wrong way, because he did not use the system that Rollo has thought of: First week, look at her; second week, write her letters; third week, give her flowers; fourth week, buy her presents; fifth week, give her lunches and suppers; sixth week, propose. Wilson says that things are done much more simply in the village where he is from, but Rollo claims you need a better system in London.

Rollo has an American millionaire uncle, Andrew Galloway, of Galloway's Tried and Proven, a well-known brand of braces. Mr Galloway was disappointed in love many years prior, so Rollo expects Galloway will not marry and Rollo will someday inherit his uncle's money.

Rollo, who is in the third week of his schedule, asks Wilson to buy flowers and deliver them with a note to Marguerite Parker, a chorus girl at the Duke of Cornwall's Theatre. Rollo dines with his uncle, who is unusually cheerful. Mr Galloway hopes to marry a chorus girl who shares his passion for food. The girl is Marguerite Parker, to Rollo's surprise. Galloway plans to propose within a week. To beat his uncle, Rollo reluctantly abandons his schedule. He buys gifts for Marguerite and sends them, with an invitation for supper at a hotel, to the theatre.

He waits forty-five minutes at the hotel, though Marguerite never appears. Rollo bitterly returns to his flat, and finds Wilson there chatting with Marguerite. Wilson married her that morning. She missed Rollo's invitation because she had the day off to get married, but thanks Rollo for the flowers. She was the girl Wilson had once loved and lost. They talked things over and reconciled when he delivered Rollo's flowers to her. It occurs to Rollo that now his rich uncle will not marry. He happily congratulates the couple and celebrates with them. He tells Mrs Wilson that he sent some wedding presents to her.

=== "Sir Agravaine" ===
- US: Collier's Weekly, 29 June 1912
- UK: Pearson's, December 1912 (source for this book)

The story parodies legends of the knights of King Arthur and stars Sir Agravaine, though the character in the story differs greatly from the Arthurian character.

Plot

The narrator states that the following story is based on an old blackletter manuscript he found in a friend's ancestral castle, though the narrator has touched up the text a little.

Sir Agravaine the Dolorous is intelligent, but unattractive, short, and weaker than the other knights. He is aware of his shortcomings and has a melancholy attitude, which is why he is called the Dolorous. A damsel named Yvonne comes seeking a knight to rid her home of a dragon. She is plain-looking and the knights are reluctant to help her, except Sir Agravaine, who finds her beautiful. Agravaine volunteers to help her, though he doubts he can defeat a dragon. Yvonne leads him to her father's castle. Her father, Earl Dorm of the Hills, welcomes Agravaine and is oddly unconcerned about the dragon.

Later, Yvonne tells Agravaine to flee, but then Earl Dorm suddenly locks Agravaine in a room. The earl argues with Yvonne, who loves Agravaine and opposes what the earl has planned, though Agravaine does not hear this. He thinks he has been kidnapped for ransom, which fortunately means the dragon was fictitious. Agravaine is rich and not worried about paying ransom. A couple of days pass, and two brutish henchmen bring him food but tell him nothing. The guards both love the same kitchen maid and Yvonne tells each that the maid prefers the other. The henchmen argue and kill each other. Yvonne frees Agravaine and tells him to flee, explaining that he was kidnapped so that he would eventually marry Yvonne. Her father has married off his other daughters by calling in knights on false pretenses. Yvonne believes Agravaine will not return her feelings. However, Agravaine does, and they embrace.

Six months later, Agravaine consults a Wise Man in the forest. He asks the man how his wife can possibly find him handsome, and how she can think herself plain when he finds her so beautiful. The Wise Man explains that true love takes no account of looks, and insists on needlessly explaining this at length, though Agravaine gets the idea and hurriedly leaves.

=== "The Goal-Keeper and the Plutocrat" ===
- US: Collier's Weekly, 24 September 1910 (as "The Pitcher and the Plutocrat", similar story in a baseball context)
- UK: Strand, January 1912 (source for this book; soccer background)

Plot

Isabel Rackstraw and the Hon. Clarence Tresillian fall in love and get engaged at a charity bazaar. Clarence goes home and finds his parents distressed. His father, Lord Runnymede, laments that he has lost his veto, and blames the wealthy radical politician Daniel Rackstraw, Isabel's father. Clarence's mother, Lady Runnymede, is upset that the family's income has been diminished because her father lost money speculating on wheat. Clarence will have to get a job. He decides to become a footballer. Isabel's father won't allow them to get married since Clarence is an idle son of an earl. Several times in the story, the narrator wishes to describe characters in greater detail but is unable due to editorial concerns about brevity.

Clarence is a skilled goal-keeper and, under the name of Jones, gets signed on by a football club, Houndsditch Wednesday. Mr Rackstraw is a fan of football and watches their matches, along with Isabel. Rackstraw's football collection rivals that of Jacob Dodson, of Manchester. Dodson covets a historic pair of boots in Rackstraw's collection, while Rackstraw wants an important ball owned by Dodson. Houndsditch Wednesday does well with Clarence. The Final will be between Houndsditch Wednesday, supported by Rackstraw, and Manchester United, supported by Dodson.

Clarence develops mumps, and is unable to play. Manchester United wins easily. Rackstraw is certain that Houndsditch Wednesday would have won with "Jones", and to prove this, arranges with Dodson to have the two clubs pay again in a private game. Rackstraw bets his prized boots against Dodson's ball on the outcome. Clarence recovers but refuses to play unless Rackstraw consents to him marrying Isabel. Rackstraw is impressed by this threat and not only agrees but also hires Clarence as a partner in his business. Clarence reveals his true name and reminds Rackstraw he is an earl's son, but Rackstraw is now willing to put politics aside. The narrator, determined to describe the family's future despite concerns about brevity, shows that four years later, Clarence is working with Rackstraw, who won the ball from Dodson, and Isabel and Clarence have a young son.

=== "In Alcala" ===
- US: People's Magazine, November 1909
- UK: London Magazine, December 1911

Plot

In this particularly serious story, Rutherford Maxwell, an English writer, works for the New Asiatic Bank in New York. He lives in an apartment building called Alcala, where the chorus girl Peggy Norton also lives. She is friendly, though she thinks Rutherford's name is too long and nicknames him George. Rutherford is in a relationship with a girl back in England, whose photograph is on his mantelpiece. Peggy knows this and flirts with him anyway, though he intends to be her friend not her lover.

Rutherford tells Peggy about his dream of living in rural England, while Peggy says she prefers New York. Nonetheless, she is jealous of the girl in Rutherford's photograph, Alice Halliday, and starts sobbing. She quickly leaves and later apologizes. For a while, she is away performing in Chicago, and Rutherford finds himself lonely and lacking creative inspiration. Peggy finally returns, and, happy to see her, he treats her to supper. She suggests he make one of his stories into a play by tailoring the lead role to fit the actor Winfield Knight, whom she used to know. In a taxi, Peggy cries again, and Rutherford embraces her and kisses her. Back at Alcala, there is a letter for him, with familiar handwriting, and Rutherford composes himself.

Peggy helps Rutherford make the lead role suit Winfield. Winfield is delighted with the part. Late on opening night, Rutherford tells Peggy about the play's great success. He thanks Peggy for her help. She supposes Rutherford will return to England soon, now that he has become successful. However, Rutherford now wishes to stay with Peggy and asks her to marry him. Peggy refuses. She implies that she partially lives off the money of men like Winfield, and is in such a relationship now. Rutherford does not hold this against her. She reminds Rutherford that his real happiness lies in England, and says he would regret staying with her in New York. She kisses him on the forehead and leaves. Rutherford picks up the photograph of Alice and looks at it by the window. A shaft of sunlight falls upon it.

== Publication history ==
In the Strand (UK), Joseph Simpson illustrated "When Doctors Disagree", "Rough-Hew Them How We Will", "The Man Who Disliked Cats", "Pots o' Money", "Out of School", "Three From Dunsterville", and "The Goal-Keeper and the Plutocrat". In the same magazine, Charles Crombie illustrated "Something to Worry About", "By Advice of Counsel", and "The Good Angel". Gordon Browne illustrated 'The Man Upstairs", H. M. Brock illustrated "Deep Waters", W. R. S. Stott illustrated "Ruth in Exile", and René Bull illustrated "The Tuppenny Millionaire".

"Reginald's Record Knock" ("Archibald's Benefit") was illustrated by R. Noel Pocock in Pearson's, and "Sir Agravaine" was illustrated by "Esmond" in the same magazine. "In Alcala" was illustrated by James Durden in London Magazine.

In Collier's (US), Wallace Morgan illustrated "Deep Waters", "Archibald's Benefit", "Ahead of Schedule", and "The Pitcher and the Plutocrat" ("The Goal-Keeper and the Plutocrat"). Morgan also illustrated "The Matrimonial Sweepstakes" ("The Good Angel") in Cosmopolitan. "Sir Agravaine" was illustrated by Milo Winter in Collier's. In Cosmopolitan, "The Man Upstairs" was illustrated by James Montgomery Flagg, "Rough-Hew Them How We Will" was illustrated by Dan Sayre Groesbeck, and "The Man, the Maid and the Miasma" was illustrated by G. F. Kerr. In Pictorial Review, "By Advice of Counsel" was illustrated by Phillips Ward, and "Three From Dunsterville" was illustrated by H. S. Potter.

"Something to Worry About" was illustrated by J. O. Todahl in Metropolitan, and "Pots o' Money" was illustrated by J. M. Hamilton Williams. "When Doctors Disagree" was illustrated by A. D. Rahn in Success. The Fatal Kink in Algernon" ("The Man Who Disliked Cats") was illustrated by F. R. Gruger in the Ladies' Home Journal. "In Alcala" was illustrated by J. A. Lemon in People's Magazine.

"Out of School" was reprinted in Ainslee's in February 1926. "Archibald's Benefit" was included in the Wodehouse collections Wodehouse on Golf (1940) and The Golf Omnibus (1973). A story by Wodehouse titled "Ways to Get a Gal" was based on "Ahead of Schedule" and published with illustrations by R. L. S. in Dream World (Chicago, US) in February 1957. "Sir Agravaine" was condensed and slightly rewritten for publication in Escapade magazine (US) as "Roderick the Runt" in February 1961. It was also published by Blandford Press in 1984 with illustrations by Rodger McPhail.

The baseball story "The Pitcher and the Plutocrat" (the US version of "The Goal-Keeper and the Plutocrat") was included in several anthologies, including Collier's Greatest Sports Stories published by A. S. Barnes in 1955 and edited by Tom Meany, The Fireside Book of Baseball published by Simon and Schuster in 1956 and edited by Charles Einstein, Great Baseball Stories published by Grosset in 1979 and edited by Jerry D. Lewis, Fielder's Choice published by Harcourt in 1979 and edited by Jerome Holtzman, and The Baseball Reader, Favorites from the Fireside Books of Baseball published by McGraw-Hill in 1983 and edited by Charles Einstein.

== See also ==
- A categorised list of Wodehouse's short stories

== References and sources ==
Notes

Sources

- McIlvaine, Eileen; Sherby, Louise S.; Heineman, James H. (1990). P. G. Wodehouse: A Comprehensive Bibliography and Checklist. New York: James H. Heineman Inc. ISBN 978-0-87008-125-5.
- Midkiff, Neil. "The Wodehouse short stories". "Neil Midkiff's P. G. Wodehouse pages".
