= Fagging =

System of using young school pupils as servants

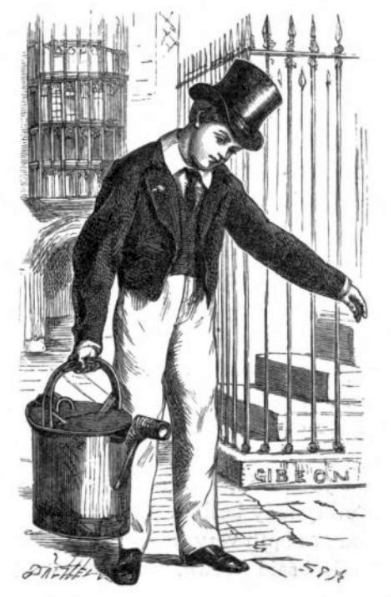
A junior at Eton fagging, illustration by S. P. Hall in C. F. Johnstone's Recollections of Eton (1870)

Fagging was a traditional practice in British public schools and also at many other boarding schools, whereby younger pupils were required to act as personal servants to the eldest boys. Although probably originating earlier, the first accounts of fagging appeared in the late 17th century. Fagging sometimes involved physical abuse and/or sexual abuse. Although lessening in severity over the centuries, the practice continued in some institutions until the end of the 20th century.

The term fagging may possibly be the origin of the homophobic slur faggot.

== History ==
Fagging originated as a structure for maintaining order in boarding schools, when schoolmasters' authority was practically limited to the classroom. Thomas Arnold, headmaster of Rugby from 1828 to 1841, defined fagging as the power given by the authorities of the school to the Sixth Form to be exercised by them over younger boys. Fagging was a fully established system at St Paul's, Eton, Harrow, Winchester in the 16th century.

Fagging carried with it well-defined rights and duties on both sides. The senior, sometimes called the fag-master, was the protector of his fags and responsible for their happiness and good conduct. In case of any problem outside the classroom, such as bullying or injustice, a junior boy's recourse was to him, not to a form master or housemaster, and, except in the gravest cases, all incidents were dealt with by the fag-master on his own responsibility.

The duties undertaken by fags, the time taken, and their general treatment varied widely. Each school had its own traditions and expectations. Until around 1900, a fag's duties would include such humble tasks as blacking boots, brushing clothes, and cooking breakfasts, and there was no limit as to hours the fag would be expected to work. Later, fagging was restricted to such tasks as running errands and bringing tea to the fag-master's study. The 1911 Britannica details an evolution of the role at Eton. Under school rules, fagging might involve harsh discipline and corporal punishment when those were standard practices.

In 1930, an inquest into the death of a 14-year-old schoolboy from Sedbergh School (then in the West Riding of Yorkshire) heard that, rather than returning after holidays, he took his life because of his dislike of the fagging system. The jury returned a verdict of suicide and recommended the discontinuation of the practice in public schools.

During the late 20th century, fagging became unfashionable in British public schools, as attitudes to boarding education and child development changed. Despite the reluctance of senior boys who had served their time and expected to enjoy the benefits of the system, between the 1960s and 1980s the duties first became less onerous and then the system was abolished at most major public schools; the passing of the Children Act 1989 caused most British schools to ban the practice and it is now obsolete in Britain.

There is a history of fagging in schools in former British colonies (such as India and South Africa) where fagging continues in a limited form at some schools.

In 2017, the actor Simon Williams described how, as a new pupil at Harrow School in 1959, he was required to fag for a prefect four years his senior, involving duties such as spit-shining his shoes, making his bed, serving tea, and even warming the toilet seat.

== Sexual abuse ==
Fagging was sometimes associated with both consensual sexual service and sexual abuse. Christopher Tyerman, writing about the history of Harrow School, stated that in some situations, fagging could either encourage or conceal sexual activity between students, and that, at Harrow, fagging began to decline around the same time as the school started actively discouraging homosexual behaviour but continued in formal school life until the 1990s.

== In memoirs, literature and art ==
Many authors have written of the experience of the harsh regimes experienced within public or boarding schools; some in novels and others in memoirs.

- Percy Bysshe Shelley, who entered Eton College in 1804, was bullied for refusing to aid his assigned prefect.
- Fagging is depicted in the 1857 novel Tom Brown's School Days by Thomas Hughes, which is set at Rugby School.
- George Augustus Sala in his 1859 book Twice Round the Clock describes the most noble Marquis of Millefleurs, aged ten, at Eton, tending to Tom Tucker, 'an army clothier's son' as a fag. He has to clean his shoes but also prepare his bacon and toast for breakfast.
- E. W. Hornung's stories about fictional gentleman thief A. J. Raffles (created in 1898) are narrated by Raffles's companion Bunny Manders, who fagged for Raffles in their school years.
- Christopher Isherwood's fictionalised autobiography Lions and Shadows (1938) mentions fagging.
- C. S. Lewis's partial autobiography Surprised by Joy (1955) mentions fagging (see Chapter VI, pp. 94–95).
- Some characters in P. G. Wodehouse's school stories are fags, such as Reginald Robinson in The Pothunters (1902) and Thomas Renford in The Gold Bat (1904).
- In his 1984 autobiography Boy, Roald Dahl states that when he was a young fag, he was instructed to warm toilet seats for older boys at Repton School, and he wrote a fictional account of the experience of fagging in his short story “Galloping Foxley”.
- Yana Toboso's manga series Black Butler showcases the fagging system in its Public School Arc, with the main protagonist, Ciel Phantomhive, becoming a fag when he enrolls to investigate events at Weston College. In the English dub of the anime, the word drudge is used instead due to the word fag having a historically negative connotation towards gay men.
- If.... (1968) shows life in a public school and the fagging system, specifically how junior boys are made to act as personal servants for the eldest boys and are discussed as sex objects.
- Evil (1981), a novel, is a Swedish example set in the 1950s.

== See also ==
- Batman (military)
- Child labor
- Dedovshchina
- Exploitation of labour
- Hazing
- No pain, no gain
- Plebe Summer
- Ragging
- Senpai and kōhai
- Toxic masculinity
