= The Captain (magazine) =

British magazine for "boys and old boys"

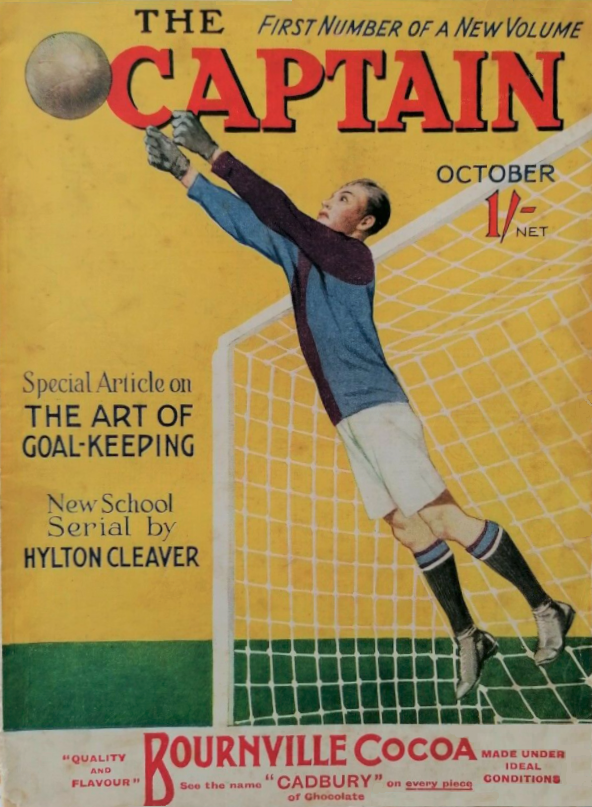
Front page, October 1922 edition

The Captain was a magazine featuring stories and articles for "boys and old boys", published monthly in the United Kingdom from 1899 to 1924. Its headquarters were in London. It is perhaps best known for printing many of P. G. Wodehouse's early school stories.

The magazine was established in April 1899 by publisher George Newnes, with R. S. Warren Bell as its first editor. Authors who contributed to The Captain include P. G. Wodehouse, F. C. Selous, Bertram Mitford, C. B. Fry (the Athletic Editor), Edward Step, Dr Gordon Stables, Harold Avery, E. H. D. Sewell, and Charles Gilson. Artists who provided illustrations include Tom Browne, Paul Hardy, Alfred Pearse, and John Hassall.

The editor Warren Bell's brother, John Keble Bell, also contributed under the pen name Keble Howard. Howard suggested turning the magazine into a pure athletics magazine, aiming at an undergraduate audience, but Warren Bell decided against the idea.

Some of the school stories by Wodehouse published in the magazine were featured in the collection Tales of St. Austin's (1903). The magazine also serialised several early novels by Wodehouse, including Jackson Junior and The Lost Lambs, which were later combined to form the book Mike (1909), and introduced to the world Wodehouse's enduringly popular character, Psmith.

Frank Swinnerton (1938) says of The Captain: "It was a good magazine, and there was nothing pious in it about prayers and such disagreeables, but stories and articles fit to be read by the self-respecting of tender years."

A bibliography, history and index has been compiled by Chris Harte.
