= Catsmeat Potter-Pirbright =

Fictional character in P. G. Wodehouse stories

- Jeeves, Drones Club character
- First appearance: "The Masked Troubadour" (1936)
- Last appearance: "Jeeves and the Greasy Bird" (1965)
- Created by: P. G. Wodehouse
- Portrayed by: John Elmes; Kenneth Fortescue

In-universe information
- Full name: Claude Cattermole Potter-Pirbright
- Alias: Meadowes
- Nickname: Catsmeat
- Gender: Male
- Occupation: Actor
- Family: Elsie Cattermole (mother); Cora "Corky" Potter-Pirbright (sister)
- Nationality: British

Claude Cattermole "Catsmeat" Potter-Pirbright is a recurring fictional character in the Jeeves and Drones Club stories of English comic writer P. G. Wodehouse, being a longtime school friend of Jeeves's master Bertie Wooster and a member of the Drones Club. A West End actor known as "Claude Cattermole" on stage, he is known to his friends by the nickname "Catsmeat".

== Inspiration ==
The character was inspired by the real life actor and county cricketer, Basil Foster, who played against Wodehouse in the Actors against Authors game at Lord's in 1907 (with Wodehouse playing for the Authors XI). Foster portrayed the hero, George Bevan, in the 1928 New Theatre production of A Damsel in Distress, and also played Psmith in the 1930 Shaftesbury Theatre production of Leave It to Psmith; both productions were adapted by Wodehouse and Ian Hay from novels written by Wodehouse.

== Life and character ==
The son of a theatrical music writer and a New York actress named Elsie Cattermole, Claude Cattermole "Catsmeat" Potter-Pirbright is the brother of actress Cora "Corky" Pirbright, who is also known by her stage name, Cora Starr. Catsmeat is engaged to Gertrude Winkworth, the daughter of Dame Daphne Winkworth. Catsmeat and Bertie Wooster went together to Malvern House Preparatory School, where Catsmeat was described in a report by the headmaster Aubrey Upjohn as "brilliant but unsound". He was also with Bertie at secondary school at Eton, and at the University of Oxford. Catsmeat's nickname is probably derived at least in part from the similarity of "Cattermole" to "cat's meat" (meaning meat prepared for cats).

Inspired by the successful theatrical careers of his parents and sister, Catsmeat, seeking a profession that would provide him with an income and spare time to play county cricket, chose to become an actor after his time at Oxford. He generally performs in comedies, playing the role of the hero's light-hearted friend carrying the second love interest. According to Bertie, Catsmeat is a very lively individual both on and off the stage. His sprightliness is a byword among his friends. Catsmeat is also known for being a fashionable dresser; in Uncle Fred in the Springtime, he is described as a "modern Brummel".

Catsmeat is first mentioned in Thank You, Jeeves, when Bertie, impressed by the effect that Jeeves's eloquence often has on the language of others, recalls a time when Catsmeat came to stay at Bertie's flat for a week, "and the very second day he said something to me about gauging somebody's latent potentialities. And Catsmeat a fellow who had always thought you were kidding him when you assured him that there were words in the language that had more than one syllable." In Right Ho, Jeeves, Bertie remembers an instance when Catsmeat made noise with a police rattle behind Bertie's chair at the Drones, though Bertie actually enjoyed the noise.

In The Code of the Woosters, it is mentioned that Catsmeat is among those who attend Gussie Fink-Nottle's pre-wedding dinner at the Drones Club, where Bertie Wooster keeps Catsmeat from giving his imitation of Beatrice Lillie. In Joy in the Morning, Catsmeat is responsible for a mix-up involving a "Borstal Rovers" football outfit he intended to wear to a costume party.

His most prominent role is in the Jeeves novel The Mating Season, during which he gets Gussie Fink-Nottle to climb fully clothed into the Trafalgar Square fountain. In that novel, he pretends to be Bertie's valet, calling himself Meadowes, and inadvertently becomes temporarily engaged to Queenie Silversmith. He also appears in "Jeeves and the Greasy Bird", in which he and Bertie discuss the theatrical agent, Jas Waterbury.

In Jeeves and the Feudal Spirit, Catsmeat is mentioned having a 'leaving party' at the Drones, suggesting that he may have moved away from the city.

Catsmeat collaborates with Barmy Fotheringay-Phipps to write an article titled "Some Little-Known Cocktails" for Wee Tots, a family publication edited by Bingo Little, and they present it to Bingo in "The Shadow Passes". Ultimately, Catsmeat plans to go to Hollywood.

== Appearances ==
Catsmeat is featured in:

- Lord Emsworth and Others (1937)
  - "The Masked Troubadour" (1936) – Drone Freddie Widgeon
- The Mating Season (1949) – Jeeves
- Nothing Serious (1950)
  - "The Shadow Passes" (1950) – Drone Bingo Little
- Plum Pie (1966)
  - "Stylish Stouts" (1965) – Drone Bingo Little
  - "Jeeves and the Greasy Bird" (1965) – Jeeves

Catsmeat is mentioned in:

- Thank You, Jeeves (1934) – Jeeves
- Right Ho, Jeeves (1934) – Jeeves
- The Luck of the Bodkins (1935) – Drone Monty Bodkin
- The Code of the Woosters (1938) – Jeeves
- Uncle Fred in the Springtime (1939) – Blandings
- Joy in the Morning (1946) – Jeeves
- A Few Quick Ones (1959)
  - "Oofy, Freddie and the Beef Trust" (1949, first published as "Freddie, Oofy and the Beef Trust") – Drone Freddie Widgeon
  - "The Fat of the Land" (1958) – Drone Freddie Widgeon
- Jeeves and the Feudal Spirit (1954) – Jeeves
- Jeeves in the Offing (1960) – Jeeves
- Much Obliged, Jeeves (1971) – Jeeves
- Aunts Aren't Gentlemen (1974) – Jeeves (ch. 14)

== Adaptations ==
Television

- John Elmes portrayed Catsmeat in the 1990–1993 television series Jeeves and Wooster in series 3, episode 4.

Radio

- Kenneth Fortescue voiced Catsmeat in an adaptation of The Mating Season in the 1973–1981 series, What Ho! Jeeves.

== See also ==
- List of Jeeves characters, an alphabetical list of Jeeves characters
- List of P. G. Wodehouse characters in the Jeeves stories, a categorized outline of Jeeves characters
- List of Jeeves and Wooster characters, a list of characters in the television series
