= Plum Pie =

1966 short story collection by P. G. Wodehouse

First edition

Plum Pie is a collection of nine short stories by P. G. Wodehouse, first published in the United Kingdom on 22 September 1966 by Barrie & Jenkins (under the Herbert Jenkins imprint), and in the United States on 1 December 1967 by Simon & Schuster, Inc., New York. The collection's title is derived from P. G. Wodehouse's nickname, Plum.

All stories except one belong to a large bag of P. G. Wodehouse regular series: one Jeeves, one golf story, one Blandings, one Ukridge, one Mr Mulliner, one longer Freddie Threepwood story, and two Drones Club members Bingo Little and Freddie Widgeon. Most of the stories had previously appeared in Argosy in the UK and in Playboy or The Saturday Evening Post in the US. The UK version included some extra items between the stories, mostly "Our Man in America" anecdotes originally appearing in Punch.

== Contents ==
=== "Jeeves and the Greasy Bird" ===
- US: Playboy, December 1965
- UK: Argosy, January 1967

See "Jeeves and the Greasy Bird".

=== "Sleepy Time" ===
- US: The Saturday Evening Post, 5 June 1965 (as "The Battle of Squashy Hollow")
- UK: Argosy, October 1965 (as "The Battle of Squashy Hollow")

Two of the characters in "Sleepy Time", the couple Agnes Flack and Sidney McMurdo, previously appeared in four other Wodehouse golf stories: "Those in Peril on the Tee", "Feet of Clay", "Tangled Hearts", and "Scratch Man". Cyril Grooly, and the publishing firm Popgood & Grooly, are mentioned in other stories including Uncle Dynamite and Ice in the Bedroom.

Plot

Cyril Grooly is the junior partner of the New York book publishing firm Popgood and Grooly. He is engaged to Popgood's secretary Patricia Binstead and has a twenty-four handicap. The firm is going to publish a book about hypnotism by Professor Pepperidge Farmer. Popgood is going to change the long title of the book to Sleepy Time. Cyril is supposed to negotiate with Farmer for his advance payment and not give Farmer more than two hundred dollars. Cyril meets Farmer, who has a gaunt and sinister appearance. Cyril tells Farmer he is about to go to Paradise Valley for a golfing holiday and wants to improve at golf. Cyril offers Farmer a hundred dollars. Farmer starts waving his hands and Cyril gets sleepy. He wakes later to find Farmer gone, and assumes Farmer simply left. In Paradise Valley, Cyril enters a handicap contest at the Squashy Hollow golf course. He tries to avoid Agnes Flack, a skilled golfer who discovered he is a publisher and talks to him about a book she wrote. Professor Farmer comes to help Cyril improve at golf. He says he feels he owes Cyril, but does not explain why.

In the contest, Cyril is paired with Sidney McMurdo, the club champion, but is afraid Sidney will scorn him for his poor golfing. Cyril gets a telephone call from Popgood, who is annoyed. Cyril was hypnotized into signing a five thousand dollar advance for Farmer. Farmer claims this was an ordinary business precaution, and diverts Cyril's attention by talking about golf. Cyril has read many golfing books but lacks confidence. Farmer volunteers to hypnotize him to be as confident as Arnold Palmer. At the golf course, Sidney is in a bad mood. Agnes, his fiancée, broke their engagement because he insulted her novel. Cyril plays extremely well, scoring sixty-two, and given his high handicap, will certainly win the contest. He thinks he should marry a good golfer and gets engaged to Agnes, who agrees because he is a publisher. Sidney is jealous and confronts Cyril. Farmer hypnotizes Sidney into being friendly, then de-hypnotizes Cyril, who immediately regrets proposing to Agnes. Farmer agrees to hypnotize Agnes so that she dislikes Cyril. She reunites with Sidney, and will get Simon and Schuster to publish her book instead. Cyril is grateful and believes Farmer has a heart of gold despite his sinister appearance. Farmer offers Cyril a lemon squash, and realizes he can hypnotize the waiter to avoid paying.

=== "Sticky Wicket at Blandings" ===
- US: Playboy, October 1966 (as "First Aid for Freddie")
- UK: Argosy, April 1967 (as "First Aid for Freddie")

See "Sticky Wicket at Blandings".

=== "Ukridge Starts a Bank Account" ===
- US: Playboy, July 1967
  - US: Ellery Queen's Mystery Magazine, June 1982

Plot

Ukridge, who looks unusually well-dressed, invites Corky to an expensive lunch. After Corky asks where he got his money, Ukridge tells the following story.

Ukridge sees Aunt Julia's butler, Horace Stout, in a pub and learns he was dismissed. This does not surprise Ukridge since his aunt often changes butlers. He chats with Stout and then goes to borrow money from his friend George Tupper. Later, Stout's brother, silver ring bookmaker Percy Stout, visits Ukridge. Percy received a lot of antique furniture in payment of a gambling debt. He needs a persuasive salesman to help sell the furniture. Horace recommended Ukridge. Percy agrees to pay Ukridge ten pounds a week. They sell their wares in a cottage called Rosemary Cottage, in Tunbridge Wells, Kent. They have a sign advertising genuine antique furniture to attract passing motorists. Ukridge sells a few pieces, but thinks he can do better. He decides to borrow books about furniture from Aunt Julia, who is interested in antique furniture. Aunt Julia, who has a cold, is glad he has a job and wants to see his stock herself. Ukridge explains that he is working with Stout, which surprises her. Before she can say anything, the doctor comes and Ukridge leaves. He telephones Horace and says his aunt will come see their stock soon.

Ukridge gives George Tupper his two quid back and takes him out to lunch. He then goes back to Rosemary Cottage. Nobody else is there and only one piecrust table is left. A policeman comes, on behalf of Julia Ukridge. She had fired Stout because her furniture was stolen while he was looking after the house. Ukridge realizes that Horace and Percy stole the furniture and thinks they have now fled, still owing Ukridge six weeks' salary. The policeman does not see any of Aunt Julia's furniture, so he leaves. A customer comes looking for genuine antique furniture, and Ukridge sells him the table for sixty pounds. The customer gives him a check and expects Ukridge to send him the table. Ten minutes later, Percy returns. He explains they had to remove the furniture before Aunt Julia arrived and pays Ukridge sixty pounds. Percy congratulates Ukridge for selling the table for sixty pounds, having sold the piecrust table himself earlier for only forty pounds to somebody else. Another potential customer comes, but says the table is a forgery. They could be in legal trouble because they have sold the table, twice, saying it is genuine. Percy borrows some matches from Ukridge, and sets the cottage on fire, destroying the table.

Ukridge finishes telling his story. Aunt Julia is fine because her furniture was insured. Ukridge supposes the two fellows who bought the table, who never got their money back, are very wealthy and have forgotten about it by now. However, the man who bought the table from Ukridge appears. He takes all the money in Ukridge's wallet, around fifty-eight pounds, so Corky has to pay for their lunch.

=== "Bingo Bans the Bomb" ===
- US: Playboy, January 1965
- UK: Argosy, August 1965

Plot

Bingo, the editor of a weekly magazine for children called Wee Tots, asks his boss Henry Cuthbert Purkiss for a raise after losing his month's wages on a horse race, though Purkiss refuses. Heading home, Bingo sees Mabel Murgatroyd, a beautiful red-headed girl he met in "The Word in Season". Mabel mentions her involvement in protests to ban "the bomb" (she does not really elaborate further). Seeing a policeman, she decides to protest so that her arrest will appear in the papers and further her cause. She sits in the middle of Trafalgar Square, pulling Bingo down with her, though Bingo is not pleased about it. They block traffic, angering many drivers. The policeman arrests Bingo and Mabel.

In the morning, the magistrate lets them go with a reprimand. Mabel realizes that her father, Lord Ippleton, will be angry about her arrest. Bingo is glad that his wife Rosie is away on a trip and will not learn about what happened. At the office of Wee Tots, Bertie gets a call from Rosie, who curtly tells him to see page eight of the Mirror. Bingo is alarmed to see a photograph of the policeman with Mabel in one hand and Bingo in the other.

Bingo goes to the Drones Club for a drink, and talks to Freddie Widgeon, who suggests that Bingo claim he has a double who looks just like him. Bingo decides to ask Mabel to claim that she was with this fictitious double instead of Bingo. Back at the office, Bingo looks up Lord Ippleton in the telephone book and calls him, asking to speak to Mabel. Lord Ippleton, distraught about Mabel's arrest, tells him she is unavailable, as she has been sent away to her aunt in Edinburgh.

Purkiss appears with a hangover. He spent the night playing poker at a friend's house, and he is now in trouble because his wife, who is away with Rosie, discovered that Purkiss was not home all night. Purkiss asks Bingo to say that they were working all night at Bingo's house. Bingo agrees, getting Purkiss to give him a raise in exchange. When Rosie calls again, Bingo tells her he was with Purkiss all night, and that the man in the Mirror photograph must have been his double. Bingo hands Purkiss the telephone so he can confirm Bingo's story.

=== "Stylish Stouts" ===
- US: Playboy, April 1965 (as "Stylish Stout")
- UK: London Evening Standard, 24 December 1965 (as "The Great Fat Uncle Contest")

In "Stylish Stouts", Rosie mentions contributing to Algy's bank account a year prior, which occurred in the 1940 short story, "The Word in Season". The Fat Uncles sweepstakes featured in the story was first introduced in the 1958 short story, "The Fat of the Land".

Plot

In a flashforward, Purkiss, owner of the magazine Wee Tots that Bingo works for, asks Bingo if he has dinner plans. The story then truly starts when the actor Catsmeat Potter-Pirbright gives Bingo two tickets to his next show. Bingo's wife Rosie and their infant son Algy are away on a trip, so Bingo decides to ask his aunt, the widow Myrtle Beenstock, to join him. Her butler Wilberforce (also called Willoughby) says that Mrs. Beenstock is away but will return soon. Wilberforce recommends betting on the horse Whistler's Mother. After Rosie sends him ten pounds to put in Algy's bank account, Bingo bets it on Whistler's Mother. The horse loses its race.

Dejected, Bingo goes to the Drones Club. Catsmeat explains that the members are entering their uncles in the Fat Uncles Sweep, in which members buy tickets and are each randomly assigned an uncle. The person who draws the fattest uncle wins the jackpot, minus fifty pounds awarded to the winning uncle's nephew as prize money. Bingo wants to enter his stout Aunt Myrtle and sell the future prize money to the club millionaire Oofy Prosser for a smaller immediate payment, but only uncles are eligible. Later, Purkiss asks Bingo if he has dinner plans.

Purkiss wants the American author Kirk Rockaway, who is in London, to contribute to Wee Tots. Since Rockaway admires the novelist Rosie M. Banks, Bingo's wife, Purkiss provides Bingo ten pounds to give Rockaway dinner, and mentions that Rockaway is a teetotaler. Bingo dines with Rockaway, who is so stout that Bingo wishes Rockaway were his uncle. Since he enjoys Mrs. Little's books so much, Rockaway offers to pay for dinner. Bingo learns that Rockaway came all the way from Oakland, San Francisco hoping to marry Bingo's Aunt Myrtle, and advises Rockaway to gather the courage to propose by drinking champagne and stout.

A half hour later, Rockaway drunkenly insults a critic on the San Francisco Herald. Having forgotten about Rosie M. Banks, he tells Bingo to pay the bill. At Myrtle's house, Rockaway speaks brusquely to the butler who says that Mrs. Beenstock is not home yet. Rockaway hits a constable and gets arrested. Bingo learns that Myrtle married Sir Hercules Foliot-Foljambe during her trip. The butler shows Bingo a photograph of Sir Hercules, who is even larger than Rockaway. Ecstatic, Bingo borrows the photograph to show it to Oofy.

=== "George and Alfred" ===
- US: Playboy, January 1967

See "George and Alfred". (Mr. Mulliner story.)

=== "A Good Cigar Is a Smoke" ===
- US: Playboy, December 1967

The character Colonel Sir Francis Pashley-Drake also appeared in "Unpleasantness at Bludleigh Court."

Plot

Young artist Lancelot Bingley is engaged to poet Gladys Wetherby. Her uncle Colonel Francis Pashley-Drake, who used to be a famous big game hunter, is supposed to give Gladys her inheritance when she marries, but only if he approves of her fiancé. She thinks he won't approve of an artist. Pashley-Drake wants an artist to paint his portrait. Gladys thinks Lancelot should do it and ingratiate himself with her uncle. Lancelot agrees, and Gladys arranges for him to go to her uncle's house in Bittleton in Sussex, and mentions that her uncle has an excellent cook. As Lancelot leaves by train, Gladys tells him he must not smoke because her uncle is opposed to smoking. Lancelot is a heavy smoker and packed a box of fifty cigars, but resolves to avoid smoking for Gladys's sake. Lancelot meets the stout Pashley-Drake and enjoys the cooking of Pashley-Drake's cook Mrs Potter. He assures Pashley-Drake that he does not smoke, and Pashley-Drake seems to approve. Later that night, Lancelot takes a stroll in the garden, then finds the front door locked. After carefully breaking into the house, he goes to his room and flings himself on his bed without bothering to turn on the light. Since he went to the wrong room, he lands on the Colonel, which startles and annoys him. Lancelot sends a telegram to Gladys saying he needs her to come help him.

Gladys arrives. Lancelot tells her that he jumped on her uncle, and that another incident happened. He had gone into the garden after breakfast with a cigar, making sure no one saw him, when he heard voices and hid in the shrubbery. In his haste, he dropped his cigar on the lawn. The voices were those of the Colonel and Mrs Potter discussing the dinner menu. Mrs Potter is shocked by the cigar. On her advice, Pashley-Drake is having the cigar finger-printed to determine who is responsible. For now, it is locked in the Colonel's desk. Gladys says they must retrieve the cigar quietly at night. She knows where to find a duplicate key to the desk. At night, they reach the Colonel's study but hear someone coming. Gladys hides behind the curtains and Lancelot crouches behind the desk. The Colonel enters and starts smoking a cigar. Gladys reveals herself and questions him. Pashley-Drake explains that he gave up smoking three years ago because Mrs Potter refuses to work for an employer who smokes. He was tempted to smoke again after seeing the cigar on the lawn. Gladys says she wants her money so she can marry Lancelot. Pashley-Drake dislikes Lancelot, but Gladys makes him consent to the marriage by threatening to tell Mrs Potter he is a secret smoker. Lancelot suddenly rises from behind the desk and offers to give Pashley-Drake his box of forty-nine cigars, and to show him where he can smoke unseen in the garden. The Colonel then whole-heartedly approves of Lancelot.

=== "Life with Freddie" ===
- First published in this volume

The story features Freddie Threepwood, who is a recurring character in Wodehouse's Blandings Castle stories. The fictional ocean liner Atlantic featured in the story also appears in Wodehouse's novels The Girl on the Boat and The Luck of the Bodkins. One of the characters in the story, the solicitor Mr Bunting, also appears in Frozen Assets. The Drones Club barman McGarry briefly appears in "Life with Freddie".

Plot

In the story, Freddie Threepwood, employed by Donaldson's Dog Joy, decides to return from England to America on the SS Atlantic to sell an order for Donaldson's to fellow passenger Arnold Pinkney, owner of Pinkney's Stores. Freddie's wealthy friend and fellow Drones Club member Judson Phipps is also going to New York but wants to avoid Arlene Pinkney, the beautiful, athletic daughter of Mr Pinkney who is going to America to play for the Curtis Cup. Judson, prone to proposing impulsively, has had two breach of promise cases (handled by the solicitor Mr Bunting, who is also handling a case for Donaldson's Dog Joy). Judson is afraid he will propose to Arlene, though he does not actually want to marry her. Judson's sister Julie Cheever is engaged to Mr Pinkney. Julie bought an expensive diamond necklace and gave it to Judson, so that he can give it to Pinkney. Julie wants Pinkney to smuggle it into America to avoid paying customs duty. Another friend of Freddie's, Joe Cardinal, nephew of Mr Pinkney and employed in the New Asiatic Bank, has fallen in love with Dinah Biddle, Mr Pinkney's secretary. Joe's inheritance is kept in trust and Pinkney is his trustee.

Joe has given up his bank job to travel on the ship and court Dinah. Freddie lies to Pinkney that Joe has been promoted to a new position in New York. At Freddie's suggestion, Judson asks Dinah to stay near him to keep him from proposing to Arlene, and Dinah agrees. Arlene, who does not want to marry Judson but fears she will accept him for his money, asks Joe to stay near her for the same reason, and he agrees. He had been hoping to woo Dinah, but has given up since she seems to be staying near Judson. Arlene, grateful to Joe, convinces her father to let Joe have his inheritance. Freddie realises that Joe misunderstands why Dinah is staying near Judson. Freddie clarifies the situation to each of them, which leads to Joe kissing Dinah. Mr Pinkney discovers Joe left his job and changes his mind about releasing his money. Judson informs Mr Pinkney about Julie wanting him to smuggle the necklace and gives it to Pinkney. Pinkney, nervous about being arrested but not wishing to go against Julie's wishes, hides it in a toy bear Judson bought for Dinah.

Freddie has not managed to make a sale to Pinkney. Dinah doesn't want the bear, so Judson holds onto it and unknowingly sneaks the necklace through customs, then gives the bear to Freddie. Pinkney tells Judson to get the bear back. Judson enters Freddie's house, and Freddie's cook Lana Tuttle, thinking he is a burglar, points a revolver at him and locks him in the cellar. Freddie later arrives with Bunting and explains that Judson is a friend. Bunting realises that Pinkney hid the necklace in the bear, and Judson is appalled that he could have been arrested for smuggling. Freddie comes up with a plan: he will hold onto the necklace until Pinkney agrees to make an order with Donaldson's Dog Joy and give Joe Cardinal his money. The story ends as Freddie triumphantly makes a telephone call to Pinkney.

== Publication history ==
In Playboy, Bill Charmatz illustrated "Bingo Bans the Bomb", "Stylish Stouts", and "A Good Cigar Is a Smoke". "Sleepy Time" and "Bingo Bans the Bomb" were illustrated by "Graham" in Argosy. "Sleepy Time" was illustrated by Charles Saxon in The Saturday Evening Post in 1965, and reprinted in the magazine's September 1985 issue with the same illustrations. "Ukridge Starts a Bank Account" was illustrated by Edward Gorey in Playboy.

"Sleepy Time" was included in the 1973 Wodehouse collection The Golf Omnibus. "Ukridge Starts a Bank Account" was included in the 1975 collection The World of Ukridge, and in the 1981 collection Wodehouse on Crime. "Bingo Bans the Bomb" and "Stylish Stouts" were included in the 1982 collection Tales From the Drones Club.

"Life with Freddie" is the longest story in Plum Pie. It may be considered long enough to be a novella, though it is categorised as a short story. In the first UK edition of Plum Pie, "Life with Freddie" is 67 pages long, while the next longest story, "Jeeves and the Greasy Bird", is 45 pages long. According to Wodehouse scholar Richard Usborne, the length and course of "Life with Freddie" suggest that it may have been planned to be made into a full novel.

In "Stylish Stouts", the name of the butler in the story is initially Wilberforce, but is later Willoughby. This appears to be an error due to a change in the character's name, which was altered between the magazine and book versions of the story. In the book Wodehouse in Woostershire by Wodehouse scholars Tony Ring and Geoffrey Jaggard, it is suggested that Wilberforce "was so embarrassed at tipping Whistler's Mother that he changed his name to Willoughby in a rude and unsuccessful attempt to disguise himself".

In "Life with Freddie", Freddie Threepwood lives in Great Neck, "near what had been the Sound View golf course till the developers took it over". Wodehouse started playing golf seriously in 1918 when he and his wife moved to Great Neck, Long Island, and he played at the Sound View Golf Club. The Sound View course inspired the Old Member's course in The Clicking of Cuthbert and The Heart of a Goof, collections of short stories written by Wodehouse, though the Sound View name did not appear in a Wodehouse story until 1966 in "Life with Freddie".

== See also ==
- List of short stories by P. G. Wodehouse, categorised by series

== References and sources ==
Sources

- McIlvaine, Eileen; Sherby, Louise S.; Heineman, James H. (1990). P. G. Wodehouse: A Comprehensive Bibliography and Checklist. New York: James H. Heineman Inc. ISBN 978-0-87008-125-5.
- Midkiff, Neil. "The Wodehouse short stories". P. G. Wodehouse pages.
- Ring, Tony; Jaggard, Geoffrey (1999). Wodehouse in Woostershire. Chippenham: Porpoise Books. ISBN 1-870-304-19-5.
- Wodehouse, P. G. (1968) [1966]. Plum Pie (Reprinted ed.). London: Pan Books Ltd. ISBN 978-0330022033.
