= Andrew P. Wilson =

Andrew Patrick Wilson (born 1886), was a Scottish theatre director, playwright, teacher, and actor. He was born in Edinburgh.

He acted as General Manager for the Abbey Theatre in Dublin, Ireland in 1914-15. There, he produced his own play, The Slough, about Irish poor. He was also one of the co-fouders and first director of the Scottish National Players (1921–1924).

In 1924 he directed a series of silent films adapted from the golf stories of P.G. Wodehouse. The films featured actor Harry Beasley as a caddie who observes the humorous dramas of various golfers, thus providing a connective tissue between the short films. (In the short stories, this function is performed by The Oldest Member of a golfing club.)

Wilson wrote radio plays for the BBC, including the series Sandy and Andy that ran between 1936 and 1947.

== Selected filmography ==
- Ordeal by Golf (1924)
