= The Clicking of Cuthbert (film series) =

1924 British film series by Andrew P. Wilson

- Directed by: Andrew P. Wilson
- Based on: The Clicking of Cuthbert by P. G. Wodehouse
- Produced by: Stoll Pictures
- Edited by: Challis Sanderson
- Release date: October 1924
- Running time: 2 reels; circa 30 minutes
- Country: United Kingdom
- Language: Silent (English intertitles)

The Clicking of Cuthbert is a 1924 British silent comedy series of six 30-minute short films, all involving golf. The series, directed by Andrew P. Wilson and starring Harry Beasley, was based on short stories by P. G. Wodehouse. These stories were originally published in various magazines; some of the stories had been featured in the collection The Clicking of Cuthbert (1922), while others were later included in the collection The Heart of a Goof (1926).

The films were generally faithful to Wodehouse's original stories and used some of Wodehouse's language in the intertitles. However, some major new subplots and gags were added, including a mischievous caddie played by Harry Beasley. The framing device of The Oldest Member was removed, leaving Beasley as the only regular in the series. The films have been restored, and three have been made available together on video: Rodney Fails to Qualify, Chester Forgets Himself, and The Long Hole (retitled The Moving Hazard).

== Films ==
All six films featured Harry Beasley, credited as The Caddie.

=== The Clicking of Cuthbert ===
The first short film had the same title as the series. Based on the short story "The Clicking of Cuthbert", collected in The Clicking of Cuthbert. Cast: Peter Haddon as Cuthbert, Helena Pickard as Adeline, Moore Marriott as Vladimir Brusiloff, and Peter Upcher as Raymond. Moore Marriott also appeared in two of the other short films in the series.

=== Chester Forgets Himself ===
Based on the short story "Chester Forgets Himself", later collected in The Heart of a Goof. Cast: Jameson Thomas as Chester Meredith, Ena Evans as Felicia Blakeney, Nelson Ramsey as the vicar, and Nell Emerald as Mrs. Blackeney.

=== The Long Hole ===
Retitled The Moving Hazard in its reissue. Based on "The Long Hole", collected in The Clicking of Cuthbert. Cast: Charles Courtneidge as Ralph Bingham, Roger Keyes as Arthur Jukes, Daphne Williams as Amanda Trivett, and Moore Marriott as the grocer.

=== Ordeal by Golf ===
Based on "Ordeal by Golf", collected in The Clicking of Cuthbert. Cast: Edwin Underhill as Richard Dixon, Jean Jay as Millicent Boyd, Moore Marriott as Reverend Heeza Jones, and Jack Rowell as Mitchell Holmes.

=== Rodney Fails to Qualify ===
Based on "Rodney Fails to Qualify", later collected in The Heart of a Goof. Cast: Victor Robson as Rodney Spelvin, Lionelle Howard as William Bates, Phyllis Lytton as June Pickard, and Dallas Cairns as Major Patmore.

=== The Magic Plus Fours ===
Based on "The Magic Plus Fours", later collected in The Heart of a Goof.

== See also ==
- List of Wodehouse's golf stories
