= A Few Quick Ones =

1959 short story collection by P. G. Wodehouse

- First edition (US)
- Author: P. G. Wodehouse
- Language: English
- Genre: short stories
- Published: 13 April 1959 by Simon & Schuster in the US and 26 June 1959 by Herbert Jenkins in the UK

A Few Quick Ones is a collection of ten short stories by P. G. Wodehouse. It was first published in the United States on 13 April 1959 by Simon & Schuster, New York, and in the United Kingdom on 26 June 1959 by Herbert Jenkins, London. The first US edition dust jacket was designed by Paul Bacon. The book's title comes from the informal phrase "a quick one", which is British slang for an alcoholic drink consumed quickly.

All the stories in the collection feature recurring Wodehouse characters and themes: four Drones Club members (two Freddie Widgeon and two Bingo Little), two golf stories (with the Oldest Member), two Mr Mulliner, one Jeeves and Bertie Wooster, and one Ukridge.

"A Tithe for Charity" did not appear in the original US edition, which instead featured a 1958 "exclusive" pseudo-Drones story entitled "Unpleasantness at Kozy Kot" (actually a rewritten version of the 1928 Jeeves story "Fixing it for Freddie" collected in Carry On, Jeeves). "Jeeves Makes an Omelette" was a rewritten version of the 1913 Reggie Pepper story "Doing Clarence a Bit of Good", which appeared in the UK collection My Man Jeeves.

== Contents ==
=== "The Fat of the Land" ===
- US; This Week, 2 November 1958 (a shorter and somewhat altered version)

"The Fat of the Land" introduces the Drones Club Fat Uncles sweepstakes, which is also central to the 1965 short story "Stylish Stouts".

Plot

Freddie Widgeon starts a Fat Uncles sweepstakes, in which the names of Drones Club members' uncles are drawn from a hat, and the person who draws the name of the fattest uncle wins the jackpot, which is well over one hundred pounds. On the first day of the Eton v Harrow match, the members will bring their uncles to their club, and the weights of the uncles will be determined by Mr. McGarry, the club bartender, who can tell the weight of anything by sight. It is agreed by the members that whoever draws Freddie's large uncle Lord Blicester (pronounced "blister") will win. The wealthiest member, Oofy Prosser, draws Lord Blicester's name, while Freddie Widgeon draws Oofy's Uncle Horace.

Oofy reads a letter from his uncle, whom he has not seen since childhood, which includes a photograph of Horace Prosser in a bathing suit. Uncle Horace is very fat. Oofy offers to trade tickets with Freddie, pretending he is giving Freddie the winning ticket out of kindness. The Crumpet who is managing the contest records the change of tickets. Oofy has lunch with his uncle and is startled to learn that Uncle Horace is on a diet to please the woman he wants to marry, Mrs. Loretta Delancy. Oofy returns to the Drones Club and tricks Freddie Widgeon into swapping tickets again by showing Freddie the photograph.

While visiting Paris, Oofy sees Uncle Horace, as stout as ever. Uncle Horace has lost interest in Loretta and in dieting. Oofy goes back to the Drones Club in London to find Freddie Widgeon, but Freddie is not there. Confident of winning money off the ticket for Oofy's uncle, Freddie had bet on an unsuccessful horse and owes a bookie fifty pounds; the bookie told Freddie that unpleasant accidents happen to people who do not pay him back, so Freddie is hiding in East Dulwich disguised in a beard until he can get the money from the Fat Uncles contest.

On the day of the contest, Oofy finds Freddie and tells him they have to swap tickets again, claiming that Uncle Horace has lost weight. When Freddie hesitates, Oofy gives Freddie fifty pounds to make the trade. Uncle Horace arrives, and the Crumpet discovers that "Uncle" Horace is actually Oofy's distant cousin. Uncle Horace is disqualified. Oofy is less than pleased, especially since he now has to pay for his uncle's lunch.

=== "Scratch Man" ===
- US: Saturday Evening Post, 20 January 1940 (as "Tee for Two") (with American setting and names; mostly followed in American edition of book)
- UK: Strand, September 1940 (as "Tee for Two") (with British setting and names; mostly followed in British edition of book)

Plot

The Oldest Member tells a young man the following story about Harold Pickering, who had a handicap of fourteen before love made him a scratch golfer, though only temporarily.

Harold Pickering is a partner in a publishing house. He visits champion golfer John Rockett to buy his memoirs. Rockett's children are named after golf courses and are all scratch golfers. Harold falls in love with Rockett's daughter Troon. He tries to propose to her a week later, gargling nervously as he does so. She leaves the room. Believing she rejected him because his handicap is too high, Harold decides to become scratch, and seeks a teacher. He admires the skill of Agnes Flack, the female champion of the club. She is athletic and tough, and her voice is so forceful that she can even make the slow-moving Wrecking Crew scatter. She is confident she can make Harold a scratch player, since she helped another golfer, Sidney McMurdo, bring his handicap down from fifteen to plus one. Thanks to Agnes's lessons, Harold becomes scratch and enters the club championship. He tells the Oldest Member that he is now engaged to Agnes because of a misunderstanding. When he became scratch, he thanked her warmly, and she mistakenly thought he loved her and said she would marry him.

The championship final round is between Harold and Sidney. Agnes tells Harold she used to be engaged to Sidney, but broke it off after he used a Number Three iron when she told him to take a Number Four. Sidney is large, intimidating, and jealous. He threatens to injure Harold, but Harold convinces him to postpone it by pointing out that posterity would not look well on Sidney for winning the match that way. Harold lets Sidney win the match and tries to flatter him. Nonetheless, Sidney still threatens Harold afterwards. Harold knocks Sidney over a bridge into the water and flees. He later returns to his house, but sees through the window that Sidney is waiting there. Agnes comes and tells Sidney she means to end her engagement with Harold, because he played so badly in the competition. Sidney tells her he should have used a Number Four when she said so, and they renew their engagement. Troon comes as they leave. Harold approaches her and is surprised when she embraces him. She explains that she had thought Harold was having a fit of some kind when he was gargling, and left to get a doctor. She only realized later that he was proposing when another man did the same thing. She fell in love with Harold when they met. He admits that he cannot keep up being scratch and should have a handicap around ten. She reveals that she has always dreamed of marrying a man with a handicap around ten, because she has also struggled to make herself scratch and would be happier letting herself slip back to ten.

=== "The Right Approach" ===
- UK: Lilliput, September 1958 (without the Angler's Rest introduction)
- US: Playboy, January 1959 (rewritten and condensed, with changes to character names)

The character Russell Clutterbuck also appears in French Leave.

Plot

A discussion about romance stories in magazines leads to Mr. Mulliner telling the following story about his nephew Augustus.

Augustus accompanies his godmother to a charity bazaar at a house called Balmoral on Wimbledon Common. He falls in love with Hermione Brimble, who lives at Balmoral with her formidable aunt, Beatrice Gudgeon. Augustus pretends he knows Mrs Gudgeon's friend, the Rev. Theophilus Mulliner. Mrs Gudgeon mentions that Hermione's father was a bishop. Augustus believes he must make himself seem pious to impress them. He speaks highly of Social Purity, which Mrs Gudgeon values, and she invites him to the house. Mrs Gudgeon's stepson, novelist Oswald Stoker, is engaged to someone named Yvonne. Oswald is worried about his upcoming dinner with his American publisher, Russell Clutterbuck. Hermione explains that Oswald got a hangover the last time he dined with Clutterbuck. Augustus claims to be a teetotaler, and Hermione remarks that he is good and steady. He proposes, but Hermione turns him down. Augustus is surprised, and wonders why she did not accept him. At one in the morning, he concludes that she misspoke, and goes back to Balmoral. Shortly before two, the butler Staniforth, in pyjamas and a dressing-gown, opens the door and is obviously annoyed. Staniforth informs Augustus that Hermione and her aunt are in town. Staniforth refuses to let him inside, so Augustus waits in the garden. He gazes reverently at all the windows, not knowing which is hers.

Oswald suddenly appears and tells Augustus that the right approach is to serenade Hermione by singing about wanting a little rose from her hair. Oswald is drunk, having dined with Clutterbuck, and Augustus ignores him. Oswald mentions that he brought Clutterbuck, who brought a dog. Oswald goes to look for Clutterbuck. The large, unfriendly dog appears and advances on Augustus. He climbs and hides in a tree. The dog leaves and Oswald returns with Clutterbuck, neither of whom notice Augustus. They decide to do Augustus's wooing of Hermione for him, with Oswald singing while Clutterbuck hums the bass. Clutterbuck, also drunk, says they have to launch ship first, and throws a battle of champagne at an upper window, breaking it. At the window, the butler demands to know who is there. Oswald replies that he is Augustus. Clutterbuck throws an egg at Staniforth. Staniforth comes out with a shotgun, intending to put Augustus under restraint. He thinks Augustus sang and threw the egg. It is now three in the morning. Hermione and Mrs Gudgeon return. Oswald agrees with everything Staniforth tells them. Mrs Gudgeon is angry at Augustus and goes to the house with Staniforth. Oswald sees Hermione start to cry. She now thinks Augustus is a sportsman and loves him. She fears she has lost him, until Augustus comes down from the tree. They get engaged. Oswald gives them a toad as a wedding present. Augustus suggests that Hermione put the toad in the butler's bed. She agrees and wants to add a few frogs, too.

=== "Jeeves Makes an Omelette" ===
- Canada: Toronto Star, 22 August 1958 (a shorter version)
- UK: Lilliput, February 1959 (a shorter version)
- US: Ellery Queen's Mystery Magazine, August 1959 (as "Jeeves and the Stolen Venus")

See "Jeeves Makes an Omelette".

=== "The Word in Season" ===
- UK: Punch, 21 August 1940
- US: Harper's Bazaar, 15 September 1940
- US: This Week, 18 May 1958 (as "Bingo Little's Wild Night Out")

Plot

Bingo Little's baby, Algernon Aubrey Little, has been proposed by Bingo and seconded by an influential Crumpet for election for Drones Club membership. Some members are reluctant to elect a noisy, messy baby for membership. The Crumpet assures them that Algy will be a beneficent member, as he has a knack for doing the right thing at the right time. The Crumpet tells the other members the following story.

Bingo promised his wife Rosie that he would add ten pounds to a deposit account for Algy for his first birthday. This was all he had on hand after getting an advance on his salary. He bets the ten pounds on a horse, hoping to give Algy twenty pounds. The horse loses. To make the money back, Bingo writes a story called "Tibby's Wonderful Adventure" about a little girl named Gwendoline and her cat Tibby. As editor of Wee Tots, Bingo accepts it for the paper, but the proprietor Henry Cuthbert Purkiss does not pay him for it, saying that all Bingo's contributions are already covered by his salary.

Knowing Oofy Prosser is Algy's godfather, Bingo asks him for ten pounds for Algy. Oofy instead pays Bingo to give dinner to a girl named Mabel Murgatroyd, whom Oofy wants to avoid. Mabel and Bingo dine and then go to a gambling place near Bingo's house. Bingo loses his money and police raid the establishment. Bingo hides in a water barrel belonging to his neighbour Mr. Quintin. Mabel hides in the barrel with him until it is safe to leave. The next morning, Rosie returns from a trip, and later confronts Bingo for gambling and hiding in a water barrel with a woman, which she learned about from Quintin. Algy's nanny reports that Algy said his first word, "Cat". This distracts Rosie, temporarily saving Bingo.

Mr. Purkiss and his wife, Rosie's friend Julia, appear. Purkiss wants Bingo to confirm that they were together the previous night, which Purkiss clearly wants his wife to believe. Eagerly, Bingo agrees, and adds that Purkiss had agreed to pay him ten pounds; grudgingly, Purkiss pays Bingo. Bingo tells Rosie that Purkiss can confirm that he was not at the gambling house. He also gives her ten pounds for Algy's account. After Rosie and Julia go to the nursery, Bingo and Purkiss once again agree with each other that they were together the previous night before they also go to Algy.

=== "Big Business" ===
- US: Collier's, 13 December 1952 (without Mulliner framework; hero is Reggie Watson-Watson)
- UK: Lilliput, March/April 1953 (without Mulliner framework; hero is Reggie Watson-Watson)

Plot

After the song "Ol' Man River" is mentioned at the Angler's Rest, Mr Mulliner tells the following story about his nephew Reginald.

Reginald plans to sing "Ol' Man River" at the annual village concert at Lower-Smattering-on-the-Wissel in Worcestershire. The lawyers of a legal firm inform him that he has inherited fifty thousand pounds from a cousin in Argentina. Reginald is happy about this because he wants money to marry his fiancée Amanda Biffen. Until now their engagement had been secret, because Reginald was not rich, and Amanda's uncle and guardian, retired financier Sir Jasper Todd, wouldn't have approved. Amanda tells Sir Jasper that Reginald has been left fifty thousand pounds. Sir Jasper knows Reginald is not very intelligent and starts to think of ways to get his money. He invites Reginald to his large residence, Wissel Hall. Sir Jasper also happens to be increasing the insurance on his house. Sir Jasper sells Reginald fifty thousand pounds worth of oil stock ('Smelly River Ordinaries'), pretending he is being generous. Reginald tells Amanda about his purchase, but Amanda realizes that her uncle sold him worthless stock. She is upset with Reginald for buying the shares and says she will agree to marry Lord Knubble of Knopp the next time he proposes.

Reginald's disappointment in losing his money and Amanda puts him in the right state of mind to sing "Ol' Man River" very well. He performs the song in blackface at the village concert, feeling particularly sombre because Amanda is sitting in the front row near Lord Knubble. His performance is very moving and he receives thunderous applause. Normally diffident, Reginald feels emboldened and goes to Wissel Hall to confront Sir Jasper. Nobody answers at the door, so Reginald climbs up a ladder to a first floor balcony. Inside the house, he sees Sir Jasper pouring paraffin over paper and shavings on the floor. Reginald supposes it is for removing stains. He remembers he put burnt cork on his face and hands, and decides he should wash up before talking to Sir Jasper. He leaves the house. Outside, he is stopped by Police Constable Popjoy, who thinks he is a burglar. Meanwhile, Amanda, deeply moved by Reginald's performance, changes her mind and wants to marry him. She sees him running away from Popjoy. She knocks out Popjoy with a wrench from behind, and tells Reginald she loves him. Reginald describes what he saw Sir Jasper doing with paraffin. She tells Reginald to go home to wash up. When Popjoy comes to, she says he was hit by Sputnik and invites him to Wissel Hall. At the house, she tells her uncle that she will bring Popjoy inside if he does not sell Reginald back the oil shares. She adds that the value has gone up and he needs to pay a hundred thousand pounds. Sir Jasper reluctantly agrees.

=== "Leave it to Algy" ===
- US: Blue Book, 1954 (as "The Ordeal of Bingo Little") (an earlier version with significant differences in plot but much reused wording in book version)
- UK: John Bull, 16 May 1959 (a shorter version whose plot more closely mirrors book version)

Plot

Bingo Little, his wife Rosie, and their infant son Algernon Aubrey, or "Algy", are on vacation at the seaside resort Bramley-on-Sea. Also there are Henry Cuthbert Purkiss, the manager of the magazine for children Wee Tots which Bingo works for, his wife Julia Purkiss, Oofy Prosser, and the American cartoonist Wally Judd. Before heading to London for the day, Rosie tells Bingo to report his missing gold cufflinks to the police, so they can check pawn shops. Bingo is concerned because he secretly pawned the cufflinks for five pounds to back a losing horse.

Rosie leaves, and Bingo sees his boss Purkiss, who is upset that he has to judge a Bonny Babies contest the next day. Bingo takes the job off his hands in exchange for five pounds. Unfortunately, the five pound note is blown away by the wind, and Bingo cannot chase the money since he has to watch over Algy, who, when unsupervised, is apt to hit men wearing Homburg hats with the spade he makes sand castles with.

When Bingo sees Oofy, he tells Oofy about his dilemma. Oofy suggests a plan: Oofy will pretend to be Algy's uncle and enter him in the Bonny Babies contest. Bingo will then declare Algy the winner, and this will make Rosie so happy that she will forget about the cufflinks. Bingo is nervous about the plan, because Algy is an unattractive baby, but he agrees. Oofy then leaves to make a telephone call to his bookmaker in London, and bets ten pounds that his "nephew" will win the Bonny Babies contest. When Oofy returns to Bingo, he says he will also give Bingo five pounds after the contest, so Bingo can buy back his cufflinks. Bingo is grateful.

At the contest, Oofy fails to appear with Algy. Bingo selects a winner at random. A police officer comes, saying that a Mrs. Purkiss saw a man with Bingo's baby and had him arrested for kidnapping. Bingo gets Oofy released. Oofy, who had an altercation with a constable, refuses to give Bingo five pounds. The police return Algy to Bingo. Later at the beach, Algy hits a man in a Homburg hat with a spade. Bingo tries to apologize, but the man, the cartoonist Wally Judd, is only too pleased to see Algy and pays Bingo twenty pounds to use Algy as a model for a villain in his comic strip. Bingo happily agrees and goes to the pawn shop.

=== "Joy Bells for Walter" ===
- US: This Week, 7 October 1956 (as "Keep Your Temper, Walter")
- UK: John Bull, 16 February 1957 (as "Keep Your Temper, Walter")

The story is an Oldest Member golf story. It is a simplified reworking of "Excelsior" from Nothing Serious.

=== "A Tithe for Charity" ===
- US: Playboy, April 1955

Plot

Corky, a writer and friend of Stanley Ukridge, is initially surprised when their friend George Tupper tells him that Ukridge visited him without trying to borrow money. However, George adds that a suit of his and some other nice clothes have gone missing. Corky goes to see Ukridge, and asks him if he stole George's clothes. Ukridge claims he borrowed them for a job interview with a friend of his Aunt Julia, the wealthy novelist. Her friend is looking for a tutor for his son. Aunt Julia gave Ukridge fifteen pounds to buy nice clothes, which her latest butler, Barter, suggested he wager on a horse called Dogsbody. Before he could bet his money, a man to whom Ukridge has owed two pounds, three shillings and sixpence for a few years spotted Ukridge and he fled. Dogsbody lost the race, so Ukridge thanks his guardian angel for preventing him from gambling. Out of gratitude, Ukridge says he will give a tithe of the fifteen quid to charity by giving a shilling each to three deserving cases, though Corky points out that a tithe of fifteen pounds should mean ten shillings each. The next day, Corky is about to go to the Senior Conservative Club to interview novelist Horace Wanklyn about "The Modern Girl" for the Sunday Dispatch, but can't find his tightly rolled umbrella, which he needs to make a good impression. Corky's landlord Bowles, who is inexplicably fond of Ukridge, tells Corky that he let Ukridge borrow the umbrella.

Corky finds Ukridge, who is nicely dressed in George Tupper's clothes and has Corky's umbrella. They realize Ukridge's job interview is with the same man Corky is going to see. Ukridge has already helped two deserving cases. First, he gave a shilling to a shabby-looking man and left quickly to escape his thanks. Then he was generous enough to put a whole quid in the purse of a girl with inexpensive clothes, but a policeman saw this and thought he was stealing from her. Ukridge explained what he did, but was only allowed to go after taking a number of sobriety tests. A ragged man comes along asking for money, and after Ukridge gives him sixpence, he is effusively grateful and practically embraces Ukridge. Corky goes to the Senior Conservative and meets Wanklyn, who is obviously uncomfortable in his elegant but stiff clothes. Wanklyn complains that his daughter Patricia, who nags him to stop dressing in shabby clothes, made him change after a man came up and gave him a shilling. He blames that man for his predicament. Corky later warns Ukridge not to see Wanklyn. Ukridge discovers that he has lost his wallet, which was stolen by the ragged individual. Ukridge is through with charity and ignores the next ragged individual who tries to trick him out of money.

=== "Oofy, Freddie and the Beef Trust" ===
- First published in the 1949 omnibus Best of Wodehouse, as "Freddie, Oofy and the Beef Trust"

Plot

Oofy Prosser makes it clear to other members at the Drones Club that he hates wrestlers. A Crumpet tells the following story about how Jas Waterbury, a "greasy bird" (a greasy-headed person), caused trouble for Oofy involving wrestlers.

Jas Waterbury proposes an investment opportunity to club member Freddie Widgeon that requires a couple hundred pounds. Freddie says he does not have that kind of money, unlike Drones Club member Oofy Prosser. Jas agrees to pay Freddie a commission in exchange for being introduced to Oofy. The next morning, Oofy tells the Crumpet that Freddie introduced him to Waterbury, who wants Oofy to invest two hundred pounds so they can put on wrestling matches. Oofy meets Jas's two large and intimidating all-in wrestlers, Porky Jupp and Plug Bosher (see "beef trust"). They go into training for a couple of weeks at a cottage.

The wrestlers become uncooperative because of poor quality meals. Oofy suggests bringing in a new cook, and Jas recommends one of his nieces, Myrtle Cootes. She cooks well for them, and the two wrestlers become friends again. To avoid paying Freddie his commission, Oofy convinces Freddie that reconciliation between the wrestlers has proved impossible, and gives him ten pounds as a consolation. Another problem arises: Porky and Plug are now rivals for the affection of Myrtle. Jas persuades Oofy to pretend to court Myrtle so that Porky and Plug will unite against him, and tells Oofy to kiss Myrtle. When Oofy kisses her, Porky and Plug threaten to harm Oofy for playing with her feelings. Jas tells Porky and Plug that Oofy is honorably engaged to Myrtle, and Oofy confirms this in order to save himself.

Heartbroken, Plug and Porky decide to give up wrestling and go to Africa. Jas says that at least Myrtle will be happy being married to Oofy. Oofy does not want to marry her, but Jas threatens a breach of promise case and violence from the wrestlers. Oofy is forced to pay Jas two thousand pounds. About a week later at the Drones Club, Jas Waterbury shows up and tells Freddie he wants to become a member. However, when Oofy sees Jas, he attacks him, and after being pulled back by Freddie, walks off angrily. Freddie, trusting and naive as ever, is tricked by Jas into giving him ten pounds.

== Background ==
In "Leave it to Algy", it is mentioned that Oofy Prosser agreed to become Algernon Aubrey Little's godfather with the understanding that, having provided a christening gift, Oofy would not be expected to give Algernon Aubrey any future gifts. This reflects Wodehouse's real agreement to become godfather to Frances Donaldson's daughter Rose on the understanding that after the obligatory christening gift, there would be no expectation of future presents.

== Publication history ==
"The Fat of the Land" and "Keep Your Temper, Walter" were published in This Week with illustrations by James Williamson. "Scratch Man" was illustrated by James Williamson in the Saturday Evening Post, and by Gilbert Wilkinson in the Strand. "The Right Approach" was illustrated by Shel Silverstein in Playboy, and by Geoffrey Salter in Lilliput. "The Word in Season" was first published in Punch, and appeared in the US magazine Harper's Bazaar with illustrations by Peter Arno. "The Word in Season" was also published as "Bingo Little's Wild Night Out" in This Week, illustrated by Richard Hook.

"Big Business" was illustrated by Robert Fawcett in Collier's, and by "Anton" in Lilliput. An early version of "Leave it to Algy", titled "The Ordeal of Bingo Little", was published in Blue Book with illustrations by Walt Wetterberg. A shorter version of the story was published with the title "Leave it to Algy" in John Bull, illustrated by Edwin Phillips. "Keep Your Temper, Walter" was illustrated by Edwin Phillips in John Bull. "A Tithe for Charity" was illustrated by Jerry Warshaw in Playboy.

"Scratch Man" was included in the US edition of the 1940 collection Eggs, Beans and Crumpets, the 1973 Wodehouse collection The Golf Omnibus, and the 1983 Wodehouse collection Short Stories, published by The Folio Society. "The Right Approach" was included in the 1964 anthology The Best From Playboy. "The Right Approach" and "Big Business" were included in the 1972 book The World of Mr. Mulliner. "A Tithe for Charity" was collected in the 1975 book The World of Ukridge. "The Fat of the Land", "The Word in Season", "Leave it to Algy", and "Oofy, Freddie and the Beef Trust" were included in the 1982 short story collection, Tales from the Drones Club.

While Wodehouse's stories generally do not reference specific years, "The Fat of the Land" is an exception; it is stated in this story that one of Oofy Prosser's uncles, Hildebrand, died of an apoplectic stroke in 1947, and his other uncle, Stanley, died of cirrhosis of the liver in 1949.

== Adaptations ==
"Big Business" was adapted as an episode of the television series Wodehouse Playhouse in 1978.

== See also ==
- List of short stories by P. G. Wodehouse, categorised by series

== References and sources ==
Sources

- Garrison, Daniel H. (1991) [1989]. Who's Who in Wodehouse (Revised ed.). New York: Constable & Robinson. ISBN 1-55882-087-6.
- McIlvaine, Eileen; Sherby, Louise S.; Heineman, James H. (1990). P. G. Wodehouse: A Comprehensive Bibliography and Checklist. New York: James H. Heineman Inc. ISBN 978-0-87008-125-5.
- Midkiff, Neil (2019-03-31). "The Wodehouse short stories". P. G. Wodehouse pages. With first publications and appearances in collections.
- Kuzmenko, Michel (The Russian Wodehouse Society) (2007-08-05). "A Few Quick Ones". Bibliography. Archived from the original on 2007-08-12.
- Netherlands, The P. G. Wodehouse Society (2005-03-01). "Short Stories by P. G. Wodehouse". Bibliography. Archived from the original on 2007-05-01.
- Wodehouse, P. G. (1993) [1959]. A Few Quick Ones (Reprinted ed.). London: The Guernsey Press Co. Ltd. ISBN 0099819503.
