= The Heart of a Goof =

1926 short story collection by P. G. Wodehouse

First edition (UK)

The Heart of a Goof is a collection of nine short stories by English comic writer P. G. Wodehouse. It was first published in the United Kingdom on April 15, 1926, by Herbert Jenkins, and in the United States on March 4, 1927, by George H. Doran, New York, under the title Divots. The stories were originally published in magazines between 1921 and 1926.

The stories all concern golf, and are told by the Oldest Member. The book can be considered a sequel to The Clicking of Cuthbert (1922).

== Contents ==
The original story titles and publication dates were as follows:

=== "The Heart of a Goof" ===
- UK: Strand, April 1924
- US: Red Book, September 1923

Plot

The Oldest Member tells a young man at the club that a "goof" is someone who is unskilled at golf and becomes overly dejected because of this. He recounts the following tale of a goof, Ferdinand Dibble.

The Oldest Member sees Ferdinand talking to Barbara Medway, who is about to leave for the summer to Marvis Bay. Ferdinand confides in the Oldest Member that he wants to propose to Barbara, but he lacks confidence in himself because of his poor golfing. Later, Barbara also confides in the Oldest Member. She has figured out that Ferdinand loves her and returns his feelings. She is annoyed that Ferdinand will not tell her how he feels. The Oldest Member explains that Ferdinand is a goof, and suggests that Barbara induce Ferdinand to go to Marvis Bay. The average skill of the golfers at the hotel there is notoriously low. Ferdinand will gain enough confidence by defeating them to propose to Barbara. She follows this advice. At Marvis Bay, Ferdinand is amazed by his success against the other golfers, including the lawyer Mr Tuttle, Barbara's uncle. Barbara had to postpone her visit to Marvis Bay at the last moment. Ferdinand does not mind waiting because he continues to win and become more confident.

Ferdinand starts holding up games to give advice to his opponents. They resent this and plot to take him down a peg. Mr Tuttle employs a young man and relatively skilled golfer named George Parsloe, whom he invites to Marvis Bay to beat and humble Ferdinand. Ferdinand agrees to play against Parsloe. He regrets this when he sees Parsloe practising. Barbara arrives at Marvis Bay, but Ferdinand is too dejected because of Parsloe to be cheerful. She mistakenly believes he is not happy to see her and has met another girl. When Ferdinand notices the resulting change in her manner, he thinks she has fallen for Parsloe, who is an old friend of hers. While the match between Ferdinand and Parsloe is going on, Barbara hears about it in the hotel and realizes the actual reason Ferdinand seemed preoccupied. She rushes to the golf course. Her uncle tells her the two players are at the fifteenth hole and have the same score. Ferdinand became listless since he thought he lost Barbara, so he is not nervously over-thinking like usual and is playing better. Barbara suddenly speaks while Parsloe is playing and distracts him, leading to victory for Ferdinand. Barbara and Ferdinand confess their feelings for each other and plan to get married. Ferdinand knows he played better because he was too miserable to worry about his shots, and is concerned he will only be happy from now on. Barbara assures him she be able to think of a hundred ways of bothering him when they are married. Ferdinand is delighted.

=== "High Stakes" ===
- UK: Strand, October 1925
- US: Saturday Evening Post, 19 September 1925

Plot

A young man tells the Oldest Member that two rich golfers at the club wagered money on who would win their match. The Oldest Member is reminded of the following story in which two men play for high stakes.

American millionaire Bradbury Fisher plays golf and collects famous golf relics, though his wife disapproves of his collecting. Bradbury returns to New York while his wife continues her holiday in England. At his home in Goldenville, Long Island, his English butler Blizzard informs him that Gladstone Bott, another American millionaire, wants to speak with him on the telephone. Gladstone has been Bradbury's rival since they were young men at Sing-Sing, and they now have the same handicap of 24. Gladstone has acquired a baffy that Bobby Jones used as an infant and wants to exchange the baffy for Blizzard, who is the former butler of an Earl and the finest English butler on Long Island. Bradsbury agrees, and the Jones baffy arrives at Bradbury's house. He worries about what will happen if he sends Blizzard away, since his wife values Blizzard highly. The next day on the golf course, Bradbury insults Gladstone's golfing ability and goads him into a match on Friday for high stakes. If Bradbury loses, he must give Gladstone three railroads, but if he wins, he will get to keep Blizzard.

The day of the match, Bradbury arrives at the course and finds Gladstone Bott waiting with two caddies. Bott plays cautiously and steadily while Bradbury is a riskier player. Their scores are the same when they reach the sixteenth hole. Bradbury's ball ends up in a grassy area, in a spot difficult to hit the ball out of. While Bott is not looking, Bradbury gives his caddie a hundred dollars, then moves his ball slightly to a better spot. The caddie says nothing to Gladstone. Bradbury cheats a second time, and bribes his caddie with a hundred and fifty dollars. Bradbury apparently wins the match. The caddie, who is actually a detective paid by Gladstone, then reports that Bradbury cheated. Victory is awarded to Gladstone. Bradbury goes home disappointed and is nervous about telling his wife, Evangeline. She returns to New York and tells Bradbury she has done something awful. She took on Vosper, the extremely impressive butler of a Duke, as their new butler. Vosper came to America on the same ship. She does not know what to do since she hasn't the nerve to fire Blizzard. Bradbury, secretly relieved, says he will try to get Gladstone to engage Blizzard.

=== "Keeping in with Vosper" ===
- UK: Strand, March 1926
- US: Liberty, 13 March 1926

Plot

While a young man at the club must wait for his wife while she telephones her dress-maker, the Oldest Member tells him another story about American millionaire Bradbury Fisher.

Bradbury employs a dignified English butler named Hildebrand Vosper, who previously worked in the prestigious household of a duke. Bradbury is pleased that his friend Rupert Worple, who was just released from Sing-Sing, is paying him a visit. However, Bradbury becomes nervous when he learns that his wife's disapproving mother, Mrs Lora Smith Maplebury, is coming. One evening, Vosper tells Bradbury that Mr Worple must go. His laugh is too hearty, and, in the butler's words, it would not have done for the Duke. Bradbury initially resists being bossed by his butler, but Bradbury's wife insists he do as Vosper says so Vosper does not resign. Bradbury reluctantly tells Rupert to leave. After Rupert has left, Mrs Maplebury arrives. To make matters worse for Bradbury, his wife is going to take up golf again and play with him every day. Vosper suggested it for exercise. Bradbury is now even more annoyed with Vosper, because his wife is an excruciatingly slow golfer. She also has little respect for the usual etiquette and rules of the club. She brings her pet dog to the course, does not replace divots, and speaks lightly of the Green Committee.

Bradbury is unwilling to play golf with her any longer. He claims he has business in the city, but actually goes to another golf course. Mrs Maplebury tells her daughter she does not believe Bradbury and suspects he is having an affair. Bradbury qualifies for the sixth sixteen in the annual invitation tournament of his new club. Vosper says he does not want to work for someone engaged in commerce, so Bradbury cannot pretend to go to the office anymore. He notices an announcement about the inauguration of a new football stadium at Sing-Sing, and pretends he must join his old friends at the event. He actually goes to the tournament, and wins a small pewter cup. He returns to the house in a cheerful mood and doubles Vosper's wages. Bradbury claims he saw a football game, but Mrs Fisher knows this is a lie, having read that the stadium inauguration was postponed. Bradbury admits he was playing golf. Mrs Fisher is glad to hear this, and forgives him. She will not play golf again because Vosper saw how she played one morning and told her respectfully that she must stop. Bradbury is pleased and trebles Vosper's salary. Vosper says that Mrs Maplebury must leave, noting that the Duke would not have approved of her. Bradbury is thrilled and quadruples Vosper's salary.

=== "Chester Forgets Himself" ===
- UK: Strand, May 1924
- US: Saturday Evening Post, 7 July 1923

Plot

The Oldest Member remarks that members of the clergy should be given more lenient handicaps, because they bear the strain of not being able to swear. He recounts the following story of a man named Chester Meredith, whose happiness was nearly ruined because he tried to contain himself in this respect.

Chester complains to the Oldest Member about The Wrecking Crew, a slow foursome that don't let other golfers pass them. A beautiful woman walks by, and Chester is instantly smitten with her. The knowledgeable Oldest Member tells him she is Felicia Blakeney, and has come for a month to visit a friend. Her mother is a well-known novelist, and her brother is an essayist named Crispin. Chester did not get along well with Crispin at school. The Oldest Member suggests that Chester pretend he was good friends with Crispin, who is away in India, to make Felicia like him. The Oldest Member introduces Chester to Felicia as a friend of Crispin. Felicia seems cold and unfriendly, which the Oldest Member thinks is due to Chester's shy stiffness. Chester plays golf with Felicia. He usually swears when he makes mistakes but resists doing so around her. He praises her brother, and her mother's novels, which he secretly hates. Felicia actually dislikes the highbrow nature of her intellectual family and is not fond of her brother Crispin. She respects Chester's skill at golf, but thinks he is too dispassionate on the links. Chester is unaware of this and proposes to Felicia. She turns him down. Disappointed, Chester devotes himself to golf.

Two weeks later, Chester has become a very skilled golfer. Felicia agrees to play one last round with him before she leaves. After a bad start, Chester plays very well. Felicia points out that he could beat the lowest course record, sixty-eight. (Peter Willard, from the story "A Woman is Only a Woman", got the highest record, a hundred and sixty-one.) Chester keeps himself from swearing and remains calm when his ball falls into some undergrowth. His attitude again disappoints Felicia. Chester can still beat the record. When he gets to the eighteenth hole, he has to wait for the Wrecking Crew. Eventually, Chester is able to play a few shots and must hole out in two strokes to break the record. A member of the Wrecking Crew called the First Grave-Digger hits his ball while Chester is bending to make a shot. The ball hits Chester in the seat of his plus-fours, and causes him to hit his ball too short a distance. Chester loudly shouts many swears. He stops when he hears Felicia say his name, and apologizes, but she is glad that he shouted. She realizes he was controlling himself before for her sake. She says she will marry him. The Wrecking Crew apologize to Chester. However, he still has one more shot to break the record, and he succeeds. Felicia and Chester admit they both dislike Crispin, and happily wander off into the sunset.

=== "The Magic Plus Fours" ===
- UK: Strand, December 1922
- US: Red Book, January 1923 (as "The Plus Fours")

Plot

The Oldest Member remarks that someone can become arrogant if they become good at golf too quickly, and tells the related story of Wallace Chesney.

Wallace Chesney, a nice and modest young man, does not play golf well but is an enthusiastic player. He and his fiancée Charlotte Dix are a happy couple. Wallace lacks confidence in golf and thinks he can overcome this by acquiring the right golf club. He goes to the Cohen Bros. second-hand shop, where the Cohen brothers, a purposeful bunch eager to make a sale, sell Wallace multiple goods in addition to a putter with a unique design. They also show him a pair of vivid, prismatic plus fours. Wallace is initially shocked by the garment's bright appearance, but when he tries them on, he feels a surge of confidence. He buys them and wears them to the club. His friends and Charlotte immediately object to the plus fours. However, Charlotte acknowledges that they have improved Wallace's game tremendously after they play a match. Wallace continues to improve in golf, and becomes conceited and unpopular. After playing with Wallace, Raymond Gandle complains to the Oldest Member about Wallace's new superior attitude, and mentions that Charlotte broke off their engagement. Concerned, the Oldest Member goes to talk to Charlotte. She will not return to Wallace unless he becomes his old self again.

The Oldest Member next visits Wallace, who claims that Charlotte's handicap is too high at 14, though the Oldest Member observes that Wallace is not truly happy. Wallace says he is bored because he is too good at golf, and everyone else is jealous of him. During the club's July competition, many spectators watch as Wallace plays a match against Peter Willard, an untalented but amiable player. During their match, Wallace plays excellently, smokes his pipe, and treats Peter as his inferior. While they are playing a hole with a lake, Peter smacks Wallace to hit a wasp, which annoys Wallace. Peter then tries to tell Wallace something, but Wallace won't listen. A moment later, he realizes he is on fire. It started because Peter inadvertently hit the match-box for Wallace's pipe when killing the wasp. Peter suggests that Wallace jump in the lake, and he does so. The plus fours are charred and ruined, so a caddie fetches Wallace's grey flannel trousers. Wallace changes behind a group of male spectators. Without the plus fours, he begins to feel uncertain of himself like he used to. When he resumes playing golf, he makes mistakes and hits his balls into the lake. Peter does the same. They sympathize with each other, and the spectators are cheerfully amused. Wallace is happy and feels that golf is fun again. Charlotte Dix, one of the spectators, is pleased that Wallace is back to normal.

=== "The Awakening of Rollo Podmarsh" ===
- UK: Strand, January 1923
- US: Red Book, March 1923 (as "Rollo Podmarsh Comes To")

Plot

The Oldest Member disapproves of the club's new bowling green. A young man says the game of bowls was good enough for Francis Drake, who chose to finish a game of bowls even when the Spanish Armada was in sight. The Oldest Member tells the story of a similar case in the history of golf.

Diffident, 28-year-old Rollo Podmarsh was raised to be overly health-conscious by his mother. He wears extra layers of clothes and regularly eats a bowl of hot arrowroot for his health. Mary Kent, the daughter of an old friend of Rollo's mother, comes to stay while her parents are abroad. Like Rollo, she plays golf. Rollo falls in love with Mary right away, while she thinks he is too health-conscious. Her opinion of him improves after he smokes a pipe, in an attempt to get better at golf by imitating Ted Ray, though this alarms his mother. One evening, Rollo asks Mary what kind of man she would fall in love with. She answers that she could only love a brave man who did something heroic. Rollo is concerned about this, and also about his golf. He hopes to finish the course in under a hundred strokes, but always scores one hundred and twenty. He starts to lose his appetite. Lettice Willoughby, his very young niece, remembers that her family's dog, Ponto, lost his appetite not long before he had to be put out of his misery because he was very old and ill. Rollo tells Lettice he feels old and miserable. However, he feels better later when Mary asks him to play golf with her.

Mary is a better golfer than Rollo and encourages him to reach his goal. He appreciates this and quietly says her name to himself. The syllables happen to coincide with the correct form and timing for the shot, and he hits the ball perfectly. Bolstered by Mary's encouragement, he gets through the first half of the course in forty-six strokes. While Jane is not there, Rollo's sister, Enid Willoughby, comes and tells Rollo that Lettice wrote to her about putting Rollo out of his misery. Enid does not take this seriously, but Rollo does, since his arrowroot tasted odd the last few evenings. He believes Lettice poisoned it, though Enid thinks the idea is absurd. Rollo thinks he is unlikely to do the first nine holes in forty-six again, so despite his nervousness about his health, he resumes playing. He gets a score of ninety-seven. Rollo then tells Mary he has been poisoned, and that her he loves her. Mary thinks Rollo is heroic, and they get engaged. Enid returns and repeats that Rollo's concerns were nonsense. She talked to Letty, who gave up when the chemist wouldn't sell her poison. The arrowroot only tasted strange because Mrs Podmarsh put something in it meant to break a smoking habit. Rollo is overjoyed. He stops taking arrowroot and worrying over his health.

=== "Rodney Fails to Qualify" ===
- UK: Strand, March 1924
- US: Saturday Evening Post, 23 February 1924

Plot

The Oldest Member thinks a golfer should think twice before marrying a non-golfer and tells the club secretary the following story.

Jane Packard and William Bates are not officially engaged, but they grew up together and there is a sort of understanding between them that they will get married someday. William, a large, slow-moving man, sends her gifts months apart, and Jane, also an athletic and slow-moving person, does not mind a slow courtship. They play golf together every day and have similar handicaps. One day, the Oldest Member notices that Jane seems discontent. She read a passionate romance novel and wants her life to be more romantic. The Oldest Member goes to William's cottage and tells him to propose to Jane and be passionate. William decides to do so at the sixth hole on the golf course. At the course, The Oldest Member sees Jane with a romantic-looking young man named Rodney Spelvin who has come to stay for a while at a house nearby. Rodney is a poet, and Jane admires his poetry. William cannot propose to her with Rodney around. Later, the Oldest Member warns William that Jane is romantic and may be drawn away by a fascinating stranger like Rodney. William doubts Jane would fall in love with a poet who doesn't play golf.

Around a week later, William proposes to Jane in a simple unpoetic way. She turns him down, saying that she loves Rodney. The Oldest Member tries to tell Jane to reconsider William's proposal. However, Rodney proposed to her, much more poetically than William did, and they got engaged. William still cares for Jane and caddies for her during the Ladies' Invitation Tournament at Mossy Heath. She becomes annoyed by Rodney for humming while she addresses her ball and for not noticing her good shots. She hits one of her balls into a waist-high river. She takes a penalty and hits another ball, but this one also ends up in the water. William suggests she play that ball from where it floats. There is a boat, which William will row. Jane asks Rodney to steer. He does so, though he is more interested in talking poetically about nature than in Jane's golf. Standing on the boat, Jane tries to hit the drifting ball, sending water spraying over Rodney, irritating him. She misses the ball and repeatedly tries again, while her opponent patiently reads a book. When Rodney tries to leave the boat while Jane is swinging her niblick, the boat overturns. Jane's bag of clubs sinks to the bottom of the stream. She tells Rodney to find it. Rodney has had enough and leaves. William retrieves Jane's clubs for her. Jane loves William and will marry him. She returns to trying to hit the ball out of the stream with encouragement from William.

=== "Jane Gets off the Fairway" ===
- UK: Strand, November 1924
- US: Saturday Evening Post, 25 October 1924

Plot

The Oldest Member is inspired by white violets in the club secretary's buttonhole to tell another story about William, Jane, and Rodney.

William Bates marries Jane. The Oldest Member warns William not to forget his anniversary, since Jane is romantic. William knows she likes white violets because Rodney used to get them for her. William has paid a florist to send white violets to Jane on their anniversary for five years, and thinks the violets will remind him. Jane and William frequently play golf together and are a happy couple. However, Jane becomes worried that he will forget their first anniversary. When the day comes, William says nothing about it. While in their garden, Jane sees a postman deliver a cardboard box with white violets. There is no message with the flowers. Jane thinks that Rodney sent the flowers, as a way of saying that, though all was over between them, he had not forgotten her. Jane is loyal to William but touched nonetheless, and puts the violets in her room. The same thing occurs on their next four anniversaries. Shortly after the fifth anniversary, when their son Braid Vardon Bates (named after golfers James Braid and Harry Vardon) is four years old, a novel by Rodney is published. The novel becomes popular, especially after it is denounced by a group of mothers and members of the clergy. The Oldest Member finds it pretentious, but Jane adores the book.

One day, Jane runs into Rodney. Rodney does not remember her at first but eventually recalls that they were once engaged. He pretends he based the heroine of his novel on her, which moves Jane. She becomes dissatisfied with William's lack of romance. She tells William she feels stifled and wants to live in a studio in town. They move into a studio in the city. Jane gives parties for artists and intellectuals, including Rodney. William dislikes this and says he will go back to their old place if she keeps having Rodney around. She says she will not be kept from seeing an old friend. William leaves and focuses on playing golf, but he misses playing with Jane. He receives a letter from the florists, asking if he wishes to renew his five-year order. William now remembers he sent flowers and goes to see Jane. Meanwhile, Jane misses William and is not fascinated by her new friends or Rodney anymore. She sees little Braid Vardon holding William's spare mashie incorrectly and realizes that she has been neglecting her son's golf education. A female neighbour mentions to Jane that Rodney tells every girl he meets that they are the model for his novel's heroine. William comes and asks if he can keep sending her white violets even though they are living separate lives. Jane is surprised that William sent the violets and apologizes. They reconcile and go back to their old cottage together with their son.

=== "The Purification of Rodney Spelvin" ===
- UK: Strand, September 1925
- US: Saturday Evening Post, 22 August 1925

This story follows "Rodney Fails to Qualify" and "Jane Gets off the Fairway", and is followed by "Rodney Has a Relapse" (collected in Nothing Serious).

Plot

The Oldest Member tells the club secretary a third story involving William Bates, his wife Jane Bates, and Jane's ex-fiancé Rodney Spelvin.

Jane and William have been married seven years, and their son, Braid Vardon Bates, is six years old. Jane invited William's sister Anastatia, an expert golfer and talented teacher, to visit and help teach their son golf. Anastatia tells Jane she loves a man named Rodney Spelvin. This concerns Jane, who does not trust Rodney. After seeing a film in which the heroine goes at night to the apartments of a libertine to beg him to spare her sister, Jane plans to secretly go to Rodney and tell him to leave Anastatia alone. She hopes to use his past affection for her to get him to agree. She telephones Rodney to have lunch with him. Rodney somehow seems nobler than before. They have lunch, but the conversation is difficult since he hardly remembers her. William sees them having lunch and knows Jane is lying when she says she had lunch at the club. William starts avoiding Jane. She realizes he suspects something, but she is reluctant to tell him the truth, since he would tell Anastatia not to see Rodney, and Anastatia would be offended and stop teaching their son. Rodney telephones the house, and Jane answers it, pretending to be Anastatia. Rodney asks her to come to his house the next day and says they will be alone. Jane is scandalized and more determined than ever to end Anastatia's association with him.

The next day, Jane goes to Rodney's house to confront him. She is not worried since she is athletic while Rodney is not, and she could beat him in a fight. William suddenly appears, along with two detectives in bowler hats. William listened to the telephone conversation between Jane and Rodney, and thinks they are having an affair. Jane explains that she came to save Anastatia, who is infatuated with Rodney. They hear Rodney and Anastatia coming, and hide. They all overhear Rodney say things to her that seem suggestive, but when they leave their hiding spots, they see Anastatia is actually just giving Rodney a golf lesson. Rodney says he is too much a sensitive artist to takes lessons in public, so he is taking private lessons at home. William asks Rodney if he has proposed to Anastasia. Rodney is shocked at the idea. He admits he loves her but he does not feel worthy of her. Anastasia is delighted and confesses her feelings for Rodney. They get married and take a cottage near that of William and Jane. In golf, they are well-matched as couples, since Jane and William have handicaps of ten, while Anastatia and Rodney have handicaps of zero and eighteen, respectively. They now frequently play golf together and are inseparable.

== Publication history ==
In The Strand Magazine (UK), A. Wallis Mills illustrated "The Heart of a Goof", "Chester Forgets Himself", "Rodney Fails to Qualify", "Jane Gets Off the Fairway", and "The Purification of Rodney Spelvin". Charles Crombie illustrated "High Stakes" and "Keeping in with Vosper". J. H. Thorpe illustrated "The Magic Plus Fours" and "The Awakening of Rollo Podmarsh".

In The Saturday Evening Post (US), May Wilson Preston illustrated "High Stakes" and "The Purification of Rodney Spelvin". Tony Sarg illustrated "Chester Forges Himself", M. L. Blumenthal illustrated "Rodney Fails to Qualify", and R. M. Crosby illustrated "Jane Gets off the Fairway". In Red Book, Gustavus C. Widney illustrated "The Heaart of a Goof", "The Plus Fours", and "The Awakening of Rollo Podmarsh". Wallace Morgan illustrated "Keeping in with Vosper" in Liberty.

All the stories were reprinted in The Golf Omnibus, a collection of Wodehouse's golf stories published in 1973. "High Stakes" and "Chester Forgets Himself" were included in the 1939 collection Week-End Wodehouse (UK edition). "High Stakes" and "The Awakening of Rollo Podmarsh" were included in The Most of P. G. Wodehouse, a collection published in 1960 by Simon and Schuster, New York. "The Purification of Rodney Spelvin" was included in the 1981 collection Wodehouse on Crime. "The Heart of a Goof", "High Stakes", "Chester Forgets Himself", "The Awakening of Rollo Podmarsh", and "Rodney Fails to Qualify" were featured in Fore!, a 1983 collection of Wodehouse's golf stories edited by D. R. Bensen.

"High Stakes" was included in an anthology titled "Say It Ain't So, Joe", published in 1947. "Jane Gets off the Fairway" and "The Heart of a Goof" were included in the 1949 anthology A Treasury of Golf Humor. "The Heart of a Goof" was also included in the 1958 anthology Great Stories from the World of Sport, edited by Peter Schwed and Herbert Warren Wind, and the 1980 anthology The Golf Book.

The book's dedication, "To my daughter Leonora without whose never-failing sympathy and encouragement this book would have been finished in half the time", is a recycling of the dedication to A Gentleman of Leisure (1910), which read "To Herbert Westbrook, without whose never-failing advice, help, and encouragement this book would have been finished in half the time". The book includes a preface, which is signed "P. G. Wodehouse, The Sixth Bunker, Addington".

== Adaptations ==
Three of the stories were adapted as short films for the 1924 series The Clicking of Cuthbert. These three stories were "Chester Forgets Himself", "The Magic Plus Fours", and "Rodney Fails to Qualify".

An episode of the television series Wodehouse Playhouse was adapted from "Rodney Fails to Qualify". The episode, also titled "Rodney Fails to Qualify", first aired in 1975.

Some of the stories were adapted for BBC Radio 4 as part of a series titled The Oldest Member (1994–1999). The radio series included "The Heart of a Goof", "Chester Forgets Himself", "The Magic Plus Fours", "The Awakening of Rollo Podmarsh", "Rodney Fails to Qualify", and "Jane Goes Off the Fairway".

The comedic play Love on the Links (2018) was adapted from Wodehouse's golf stories.

== See also ==
- List of Wodehouse's golf stories
