= Nothing Serious (short story collection) =

1950 short story collection by P. G. Wodehouse

First edition

Nothing Serious is a collection of ten short stories by P. G. Wodehouse. It was first published in the United Kingdom on 21 July 1950 by Herbert Jenkins, London, and in the United States on 24 May 1951 by Doubleday & Co., New York. It was published again in 2008 by The Overlook Press.

The stories mostly feature appearances from Wodehouse's recurring characters, including two Drones Club stories about Bingo Little and Freddie Widgeon, five Oldest Member golf stories, one Blandings Castle story, one Ukridge story, and a standalone story. Seven of the stories were first published in magazines, while the other three were originally published in this collection.

== Contents ==
=== "The Shadow Passes" ===
- First published in this volume

Plot

A Crumpet and his elderly relative are having lunch at the Drones Club when someone throws a bread roll at them. It was meant as a civil greeting to the Crumpet, though it startled his relative. It came from one of two young men at a table; one of them is the club's darts champion, Horace Pendlebury-Davenport, who would not have missed, so it must have been the other, Bingo Little. The Crumpet says that they must make allowances for Bingo, who has recently overcome an ordeal. The Crumpet tells the following story.

Bingo's wife Rosie thinks it would be sweet if the nanny who helped raise Bingo, Sarah Byles, also cares for their son Algernon "Algy" Aubrey Little. Rosie hires her, but Bingo wants to get rid of Nannie Byles after she starts telling embarrassing stories about him. Meanwhile, Bingo is in financial trouble after losing money on a horse race. Oofy Prosser, the club millionaire, has drawn Horace Davenport in the club darts sweepstakes, meaning Oofy will likey win the prize money of thirty-three pounds ten shillings.

Oofy sells Bingo the Horace ticket for five pounds, which Bingo obtains by secretly pawning his diamond cufflinks. Nannie Byles tells Rosie the cuff links were stolen. Later, Horace tells Bingo, as he previously told Oofy, that he is too upset to participate in the darts contest. He is heartbroken since Valerie Twistleton broke their engagement. Horace thinks she loves someone else. Bingo persuades Horace to compete anyway, despite his bad mood.

Bingo wants to talk to Valerie over dinner, but this may seem suspicious since Rosie is out of town, so he tells Byles he is unwell and going to bed. In fact he goes to see Valerie, and finds out that she thought Horace had fallen in love with someone else. Bingo explains that Horace thought the same thing about her. Before he can persuade her to talk to Horace, Nannie Byles shows up looking for Bingo, and Bingo flees. The next day, fellow Drones Barmy Fotheringay-Phipps and Catsmeat Potter-Pirbright tell Bingo that Horace won the contest. Horace and Valerie had talked and reconciled. Bingo buys back his cuff links. Nannie Byles told Rosie that she saw Bingo go out, but Bingo convinces Rosie that Byles is delusional about that, as well as about the cuff links being stolen, which prompts Rosie to fire Byles.

=== "Bramley Is So Bracing" ===
- US: Saturday Evening Post, 28 October 1939
- UK: Strand, December 1940

The title derives from an advertising slogan, "Skegness is so bracing", made famous by the 1908 poster, The Jolly Fisherman.

Plot

Freddie Widgeon warns other Drones not to go near the seaside town Bramley-on-Sea. A Crumpet tells the story of Freddie's ordeals there. Freddie, in love with Mavis Peasmarch, goes to the town to see her. He visits as a guest at the cottage where his friend Bingo Little and Bingo's wife Rosie are staying with their infant son, Algernon Little. Freddie meets a stout blonde-haired woman on her way to meet her gentleman friend.

Freddie learns from Mavis's father, Lord Bodsham, that Mavis's brother Wilfred attends the nearby school that Freddie once attended and which is run by Freddie's old schoolmaster the Rev. Aubrey Upjohn, St. Asaph's (possibly another name for Malvern House). Seeing the blonde woman again, Freddie is perplexed when she suddenly breaks into a run and an angry elderly man follows her. She jumps into Freddie's car and wants him to drive off, but the man catches up and threatens Freddie before pulling her away. Freddie is perturbed and confused. Mavis mistakenly thinks the old man was angry because Freddie had a fling with his daughter, the blonde woman.

To win over Mavis, Freddie decides to do a kindly act: he will get Upjohn to give the school, particularly Wilfred, a half-holiday, and in return, Freddie will get Bingo to eventually send his baby to Upjohn's school. Without permission, Freddie brings Bingo's baby to Upjohn's study. Upjohn is not present. Depressed by the memory of being punished there, Freddie steps outside and sees, over the fence, the blonde girl waving at him from a window. She conveys through gestures that she made plans to elope with a bookmaker named George Perkins, but her father, who disapproves of bookmakers, found out and locked her in her room. Freddie helps her get out. The angry old man appears and chases her, hitting her with the handle of a fork before charging threateningly at Freddie, with the fork turned around. He thinks Freddie is George Perkins. The old man trips and Freddie and the girl escape.

Freddie drives her to George's place. Realizing he left Bingo's baby in Upjohn's study, Freddie returns to the school, where Upjohn berates his former pupil for leaving the baby. Next, Freddie goes back to Bingo's residence. Bingo, worried, asks Freddie if he has seen his baby. Freddie realizes he has again forgotten the baby in Upjohn's study. He tells Bingo to collect his baby from Upjohn. Knowing Rosie will be angry with Freddie, Bingo says that Freddie should return to London. Freddie tries to explain himself to Mavis, who saw Freddie driving with the blonde woman, but the blonde woman appears, and, now happily married, kisses Freddie out of gratitude. Freddie gives up and flees Bramley-on-Sea, hoping never to return.

=== "Up from the Depths" ===
- First published in this volume

Plot

The Oldest Member says that Ambrose Gussett will never forget his wife's birthday, and explains why by telling the following story.

Ambrose is a well-liked young doctor, and a golfer with a handicap of two. He falls in love with Evangeline Tewkesbury, who has come to the community visiting her aunt. The Oldest Member doubts that Ambrose should consider proposing to Evangeline, since she plays tennis and not golf, but Ambrose says he loves her anyway. He calls at her house but faces competition from tennis-playing suitors, particularly Dwight Messmore. Ambrose asks Evangeline to let him give her a golf lesson, but she has a low opinion of the game and refuses, so he becomes a tennis player. While Ambrose is being taught by a professional, Dwight makes fun of his poor tennis playing. After some lessons, Ambrose asks Evangeline to play a game with him and she agrees. Dwight, who has been accepted in the Davis Cup team, acts superior and again makes fun of Ambrose. Ambrose loses their game and asks Evangeline if she thinks he will ever be a good tennis player. She hesitates to answer, while Dwight tells Ambrose that he at least has entertainment value. Dwight says he has filmed Ambrose playing tennis on a ciné-kodak from time to time, to amuse his friends at parties. In addition to being angered by this, Ambrose worries that the films will negatively affect his prestige as a doctor.

The next day, Ambrose goes to Dwight's residence to confront him, but sees that Dwight is ill and starts acting like a doctor. Dwight gave a party the previous night and drank a lot, but blames his condition on the caviare for being whitefish roe coloured with powdered charcoal. Dwight is also annoyed by a parrot which was delivered to his house, though he does not remember ordering one. Ambrose advises him to rest. He then visits Evangeline. Her aunt tells Ambrose that Evangeline is upset, because nobody her remembered her birthday, though Dwight had promised to buy a parrot for her. Ambrose returns to Dwight's place and offers to take the parrot off Dwight's hands to ensure he can rest. Dwight gives him the parrot, and the films out of gratitude. Ambrose then gives the parrot to Evangeline, and proposes to her. She considers that she likes Ambrose but cannot marry him because he looks ridiculous on the tennis court. She refuses, which disappoints Ambrose. To cheer him up, she agrees to let him give her a golf lesson. Ambrose gladly teaches her golf. She misses the ball, while Ambrose is able to hit it far down the fairway. Humbled, she says she will marry him. Ambrose embraces her and then continues the golf lesson.

=== "Feet of Clay" ===
- US: This Week, 18 June 1950 (as "A Slightly Broken Romance")

One of the characters in the story, Captain Jack Fosdyke, also appeared in "Monkey Business". Sidney McMurdo and Agnes Flack also appear in "Those in Peril on the Tee", "Tangled Hearts", "Scratch Man", and "Sleepy Time".

Plot

The Oldest Member says that it is important to have a true golfing spirit, and tells the following story about Sidney McMurdo and Agnes Flack.

Sidney McMurdo and Agnes Flack are engaged and both expert golfers. At the seaside resort of East Bampton, Agnes is happy she is engaged to Sidney and swims cheerfully, splashing and singing. A stranger mistakenly thinks she is drowning and pulls her from the water. She is charmed by his handsome appearance. The man, Captain Jack Fosdyke, introduces himself as an English explorer. He knows her uncle, Josiah Flack, who is extremely rich, frail, and has no children. He treats her to dinner. He boasts about his bravery as an explorer, and about being a scratch golfer. Agnes asks him to play the next day, but he tells her he will be busy having lunch in Washington with Harry Truman. He adds that he can give Agnes some pointers, and that Bobby Jones learned from him. Agnes is very impressed. When Sidney later arrives at the resort, Agnes breaks their engagement and is now betrothed to the Captain. Jealous, Sidney heads to Jack Fosdyke's cottage and finds him cleaning a notched elephant gun. After Jack Fosdyke states he will not hesitate to use it against someone who smirches his honour, Sidney politely leaves.

Sidney bumps into a beautiful woman. She says she has been waiting for him and loves him, though Sidney does not recognize her. She is Cora McGuffy Spottsworth, a widow and a writer of romance novels. Having been rejected by Agnes, Sidney is glad to have Cora's affection. Cora asks if he remembers when they were Marc Antony and Cleopatra in past lives, and he pretends he does. She is also a good golfer. They get engaged. Agnes gets jealous and dislikes Cora. Cora and Agnes compete in the Women's Singles, a golf competition. In the semi-finals, they face different opponents. When it starts to rain, Jack Fosdyke suggests that Agnes concede the match so they can get out of the rain. Agnes is disappointed that he lacks the true golfing spirit. She decides he must be joking, though he really is annoyed by the rain and only stays because Agnes is likely to inherit a lot of money. A Pekingese dog comes and picks up Agnes's ball. She can't move the dog because it is a hazard. Nothing in the rules prevents a spectator from moving the dog, so she tells Jack to move the dog. He is afraid of being bitten and says the match doesn't really matter. Agnes threatens to end their engagement if he refuses. A rich heiress comes and retrieves her dog, which still has the ball. Jack leaves Agnes and goes to court the rich woman. Agnes concedes the match. Cora ends her engagement with Sidney because he insisted she play even though it was raining. Agnes and Sidney want to be together again and renew their engagement.

=== "Excelsior" ===
- US: Argosy, 1 July 1948 (as "The Hazards of Horace Bewstridge")

A simplified reworking of "Excelsior" by Wodehouse was published under the title "Keep Your Temper, Walter" in the US in This Week in 1956 and in the UK in John Bull in 1957. A longer version of this story, titled "Joy Bells for Walter", was published in A Few Quick Ones (1959).

Plot

The Oldest Member discusses golfers with low handicaps who nonetheless lack the proper golfing spirit, and mentions a fine example of a devoted golfer with a high handicap, Horace Bewstridge. He proceeds to tell the man's story.

Bewstridge loves Vera Witherby, so he acquaints himself with her uncle Ponsford Botts and his family. The Oldest Member himself sees Bewstridge's list of how to pander to each one of the Bottses: Laugh at Mr Botts's tiresome jokes, talk about Mrs. Botts's excessively whimsical books, praise the actress whom the young Irwin Botts admires, etc. Bewstridge wants to win the President's Cup, a golf tournament open to players with handicaps not less than twenty-four. However, Bewstridge's boss, R. P. Crumbles, tells Bewstridge not to win. Bewstridge's main opponent, Sir George Copstone, owns a chain of stores that Crumbles wants to buy, and Crumbles thinks Copstone will be more willing to sell if he wins. If Bewstridge defeats Copstone, he will be fired. The next day, Bewstridge and Copstone do indeed find themselves opposed in the final round. Bewstridge decides to play for as long as possible before resigning. As the heated game progresses, however, Bewstridge becomes determined to win. Crumbles reminds Bewstridge of his orders, but Bewstridge refuses to give up what he believes is his only chance of winning a cup. A tense match leads to an equal position at the eighteenth hole.

A group comes consisting of Ponsford Botts, Irwin Botts, and the Botts dog, Alfonse. Bewstridge's ball lands two feet from the hole on top of the hill, but the dog Alphonse moves the ball several yards away. Bewstridge is then unable to concentrate because of Alphonse's barking. Bewstridge realizes that kicking Alphonse would probably hurt his chances to ingratiate himself with Vera's relatives, but he wants to win, so he kicks Alphonse off the hill and into the chasm next to it. He is still unable to concentrate, due to Irwin and Ponsford shouting protests, so he kicks them into the chasm as well. Crumbles appears and scolds Bewstridge for doing this and for not having lost already to Copstone. Bewstridge sends Crumbles into the chasm, along with Mrs. Botts, who had started conversing loudly with those already inside. Bewstridge can finally concentrate, but swings convulsively at Vera's unexpected voice. The ball lands in the hole and Bewstridge wins the cup. However, he has also lost his job, and probably all hope of marrying Vera. However, Vera actually thanks Bewstridge for kicking her annoying relatives into the chasm. She agrees to marry him. Copstone, who also thinks the Bottses are annoying, gives Bewstridge a job with his company.

=== "Rodney Has a Relapse" ===
- Canada: National Home Monthly (Winnipeg, Manitoba), February 1949 (as "Rupert Has a Relapse")

Most of the characters in the story previously appeared in the last three stories in the 1926 collection The Heart of a Goof. "Rodney Has A Relapse" has several thinly veiled references to A. A. Milne in the character of Rodney Spelvin, a writer, who writes sentimental poetry about his son Timothy. This followed an antagonism between Wodehouse and Milne over the former's alleged treachery during the Second World War.

Plot

Without any cue whatsoever, the Oldest Member starts telling the following story about six people: William Bates, his wife Jane Bates, their son Braid, William's sister Anastatia Spelvin, Anastatia's husband Rodney Spelvin, and their son Timothy.

William tells the Oldest Member he is concerned about Rodney. While William and Jane were playing against Anastatia and Rodney in golf, Rodney gave up victory because in order to make his shot he would have had to crush a daisy, and said that the pixies would never forgive him if he did. The Oldest Member realizes that Rodney, who used to be a poet but became a mystery writer instead after taking up golf and marrying Anastatia seven years ago, is having a relapse into poetry. Rodney's new poems are inspired by Timothy, who is called "Timothy Bobbin" in the poems. William pities Timothy, and shows the Oldest Member some early drafts of Rodney's poems for children. The Oldest Member is concerned and contemplates the problem. He thinks it is a good sign when Rodney enters the Rabbits Umbrella, a local competition open to those with a handicap of eighteen or over. Jane tells the Oldest Member that Timothy has started acting in an annoying, exaggeratedly cute way and talks about things like flowers and fairies to get attention. The Oldest Member gets an idea. They will tell Braid about the poems, and Braid, an outspoken child, will make fun of Timothy, embarrassing Timothy and Rodney will stop.

The Oldest Member shows Braid one of the poems. However, Braid likes the poem, and refuses to participate in the Children's Cup if William doesn't write poems about him. William and Jane have invested a lot in Braid's golf education, so William has to agree. At the final match of the Rabbits Umbrella, Rodney faces Joe Stocker, who has hay fever but does fine in the match since he took a remedy. Anastatia hopes that Rodney will devote himself to golf again if he wins the competition. The Oldest Member is pleased to see that Rodney takes the match seriously and does not pay attention to birds or anything poetic. Timothy suddenly appears and puts on an act again, saying he has made friends with a nice beetle, but Rodney is focused on the game and tells Timothy to leave. At the eighteenth hole, Timothy returns and again acts cute by showing a posy of wild flowers to Stocker. This makes Stocker sneeze and hit his ball far out of sight. Rodney tells Timothy to leave again while hoping the ball missed. However, it actually fell into the hole. Timothy returns once more and puts on yet another act, surprising Rodney while he is swinging his club, making him lose the competition. Rodney gets angry and spanks Timothy. Anastatia is sorry for Timothy but relieved that Rodney's poetry is at an end. Despite protest from Braid, Jane insists that William isn't going to write any poems.

=== "Tangled Hearts" ===
- US: Cosmopolitan, September 1948 (as "I'll Give You Some Advice")

Plot

A young man named Smallwood Bessemer gets married at a church near the Oldest Member's club. Smallwood almost gives the officiating clergyman advice but stops himself. The Oldest Member tells the following story about how Smallwood used to give advice frequently.

Smallwood Bessemer is a newspaper columnist and is in the habit of giving people advice, even if they don't want it. He is engaged to golfer Celia Todd. At a dance at the golf club-house, she ends their engagement after he tells her what is wrong with her dancing. Agnes Flack has also broken her engagement to Sidney McMurdo for not following her golfing advice. Smallwood is not a golfer but he commiserates with Sidney. Smallwood advises Sidney to dance with another girl to make her jealous, and follows his own advice by dancing with Agnes. Later, Sidney tells Smallwood he followed his advice but an unfortunate thing occurred. He got engaged to Celia Todd. Smallwood gets engaged to Agnes Flack to make a statement to Celia. He later regrets this but is afraid to break up with Agnes, who is muscular and intimidating. He learns that Sidney, who is also muscular and intimidating, was engaged to Agnes. Sidney works for an insurance company, so Smallwood takes out an insurance policy with him before Sidney realizes Smallwood is engaged to Agnes. When Sidney learns this, he threatens Smallwood but cannot harm him because of the insurance policy.

Agnes enters a women's golf handicap competition. She is a champion golfer and wants to win, but it becomes evident that another competitor, Julia Prebble, was under-handicapped, apparently because she is engaged to a member of the handicapping committee. Smallwood gives Agnes advice while she is playing, which distracts her and causes her to lose. She charges at Smallwood with her club, and he flees and hides in some bushes. She returns to Sidney and they walk off together. Smallwood waits a while before coming out of the bushes. On a bridge, he sees a woman approaching and hears a shout. He thinks it is Agnes shouting at him, so he jumps into the water. Reaching for support, he finds himself grasping Celia's dog, which fell in the water. The woman, who turns out to be Celia, thanks Smallwood for saving her dog. She explains that she broke her engagement to Sidney after he gave her dog tonic port and Pirbright got a hangover. Smallwood had recommended the tonic port to Sidney, but denies this to Celia. He realizes that his habit of giving advice gets him into trouble and stops giving advice.

=== "Birth of a Salesman" ===
- US: This Week, 26 March 1950

See "Birth of a Salesman". (A Lord Emsworth story. Sometimes grouped within the Blandings Castle story sequence, although it does not take place at or even remotely near to Blandings Castle.)

=== "How's That, Umpire?" ===
- First published in this volume

Plot

Conky Biddle hates cricket, but must accompany his uncle Everard, Lord Plumpton, to cricket matches because he is financially dependent on his uncle. While in a taxi in a traffic jam, he hears the voice of an American woman who is driving a nearby car. She makes fun of cricket and argues with her companion, who evidently likes cricket. Conky falls in love with her because of their mutual dislike for the sport, but then she drives away. Later, Conky learns Lord Plumpton has sprained his ankle. Plumpton is irritated and says that a girl hit him with her car. Conky goes outside and sees a car stop in front of the house. Conky recognizes the voice of the woman driving it from before. She wants to see Lord Plumpton to give him flowers. Conky knows his uncle is angry at her and advises her against seeing him. He tells her that he overheard her views on cricket and shares her opinions. Her companion in the car was her fiancé, cricketer Eustace Davenport-Simms, but their engagement is now over. She has to leave before Conky can ask for her name or address.

At a cricket game at Lord's the next morning, Conky sees her again. He explains that he has to watch cricket because he is dependent on his uncle. He is not very bright and has not been able to keep a job. However, he hopes to make a lot of money from a ten-pound investment he made to a man called MacSporran, who claimed he could extract gold from seawater. The woman mentions that her father is a millionaire, which makes Conky nervous because he does not want to marry her for her money. She came to the cricket match to shoot wads of tin foil at some of the spectators with a piece of elastic, and hits Lord Plumpton. Lord Plumpton is furious and has them both brought to the Marylebone Cricket Club committee room, where the President presides over the case. Lord Plumpton calls the woman, whose name is Clarissa Binstead, a menace. Conky defends her. He proposes to her and she accepts. The President is unwilling to take any action against her because she is American and he does not want an international incident, so Lord Plumpton instead disinherits Conky. Conky gets a telephone call from MacSporran, who won't give Conky any money. Conky thinks he cannot marry Clarissa because he does not have money or a job, but she solves the problem by suggesting he work as a yes-man, or at least a nodder, at her father's company.

=== "Success Story" ===
- US: Argosy, 1 March 1947 (as "Ukie Invests in Human Nature")

Plot

Ukridge is mysteriously in funds and treats Corky to an expensive dinner. Ukridge mentions he had been considering becoming master of ceremonies at an East End boxing joint, but has decided against this. Three weeks prior, the man who offered Ukridge this position told him he needed to acquire dress clothes. Ukridge continues telling the following story.

Seeking five pounds to buy secondhand dress clothes, Ukridge goes to his Aunt Julia's house, The Cedars, for a loan. Aunt Julia refuses, saying that he would just gamble with it. She goes on a trip to the Riviera. Ukridge, inspired by her mention of gambling, thinks of using The Cedars as an illegal gambling house. He tries to convince his aunt's butler Oakshott to become his partner in the scheme, but Oakshott refuses to betray his employer's trust. Later, Ukridge's eccentric friend "Looney" Coote tells Ukridge that he lost money gambling at The Cedars. Looney believes the game was rigged and thinks the place deserves a lesson. Ukridge realizes that Oakshott took his idea, and confronts Oakshott. Oakshott admits it and offers him five pounds. Ukridge wants more and threatens to inform his aunt about the gambling, but Oakshott responds that he knows a few things about Ukridge too. Ukridge learns the master of ceremonies job will only be open for another twenty-four hours, and regrets rejecting Oakshott's money.

Ukridge returns to The Cedars that night. Oakshott, who is busy managing the gambling house, refuses to pay Ukridge. Ukridge goes to grab a clock in his aunt's bedroom, hoping to pawn it, but the door is locked. He gets a ladder to break in through the balcony windows. On the balcony, Ukridge notices Oakshott enter the bedroom, to hide his profits there. Sounds of a police raid come from below. Oakshott hides in a wardrobe. Ukridge enters the room and locks the wardrobe door. He mimics the voices of two policemen locking Oakshott in the wardrobe, with one of the officers soon exiting. As Ukridge had predicted, Oakshott slips at least ten pounds under the wardrobe door. After taking the bribe, Ukridge unlocks the wardrobe door and flees. Some other people in hiding also bribe him.

Ukridge is surprised to find Aunt Julia hiding in the potting shed. She came to confront Oakshott when the raid started, and worries there will be a scandal if she is found. Ukridge proves he was not gambling since he is not in the required evening dress. He volunteers to see if the way is clear for her. Outside, Ukridge sees Looney Coote, dressed like a policeman. Looney came to give the place a lesson. There aren't actually any police. Ukridge reminds him impersonating a policeman is illegal and convinces him to leave. Looney first explains that he locked some people in the drawing room, who tried to bribe him, and asks Ukridge to let them out. Ukridge tells his aunt her escape route is clear, then lets the patrons out after taking their bribe.

Ukridge tells Corky that this is how he acquired his money, and that he is now a welcome guest in his aunt's home. However, he finds that he has forgotten his money, and Corky will have to pay for their meal.

== Publication history ==
"Bramley Is So Bracing" was illustrated by James Williamson in The Saturday Evening Post and by Gilbert Wilkinson in the Strand. This was the last Wodehouse story published by the Strand. "Feet of Clay" was illustrated by Glen Fleischmann in This Week. "Rodney Has a Relapse" was illustrated by John Fernie in National Home Monthly (Canada). "Tangled Hearts" was illustrated by Austin Briggs in Cosmopolitan. "Excelsior" and "Success Story" were published in Argosy with illustrations by Ray Johnson.

The 1940 American edition of Eggs, Beans and Crumpets featured "Bramley Is So Bracing". Along with the other golf stories in this volume, "Up from the Depths" was included The Golf Omnibus (1973), a collection of Wodehouse's golf stories. "Success Story" was included in The World of Ukridge, published in 1975 by Barrie & Jenkins. "Bramley Is So Bracing" and "Rodney Has a Relapse" were included in the 1978 collection Vintage Wodehouse.

"The Shadow Passes" and "Bramley Is So Bracing" were included in the 1982 collection Tales from the Drones Club. "Tangled Hearts" and "Excelsior" were included in the Wodehouse golf story collection Fore!, published in 1983. "Bramley Is So Bracing" and an extract from "Success Story" were collected in The World of Wodehouse Clergy (1984), which featured clergy-related Wodehouse stories.

"Excelsior" was included in the 1952 anthology The Best Humor Annual, edited by Louis Untermeyer and Ralph E. Shikes, and published by Henry Holt, New York.

== Adaptations ==
"Feet of Clay" and "Tangled Hearts" were adapted for television as episodes of the series Wodehouse Playhouse (1974–1978).

== See also ==
- List of short stories by P. G. Wodehouse, categorised by series

== References and sources ==
Sources

- McIlvaine, Eileen; Sherby, Louise S.; Heineman, James H. (1990). P. G. Wodehouse: A Comprehensive Bibliography and Checklist. New York: James H. Heineman Inc. ISBN 978-0-87008-125-5.
- Midkiff, Neil. "The Wodehouse short stories". P. G. Wodehouse pages.
- Wodehouse, P. G. (1988) [1950]. Nothing Serious (Reprinted ed.). London: Arrow Books Limited. ISBN 0140025685.
