= The Wrecking Crew (Wodehouse) =

Quartet of fictional golf players in P. G. Wodehouse stories

The Wrecking Crew is a recurring group of fictional characters from the golf stories of British comic writer P. G. Wodehouse; a foursome infamous for their grotesque golfing techniques and tedious pace of play. The characters are referred to as "The First Grave Digger", "The Man with the Hoe", "Old Father Time", and "Consul, the Almost Human".

== Introduction ==
They featured prominently in the short story "Chester Forgets Himself" (1923), and act as a catalyst whereby the protagonist finds himself uttering a string of profanity in front of a lady whom he very much wants to impress.

"The Wrecking Crew consisted of four retired business men who had taken up the noble game late in life because their doctors had ordered them air and exercise."

Their moniker expresses their painfully awkward, brutally slow, meandering and extraordinarily destructive progress over the course—their endless practice-swings, infinite brooding over putts, labored swings, foozled shots and onward crawl, leaving a devastated landscape littered with massive, irreplaceable divots in their wake—but the individual names are allusive as well.

=== The First Grave Digger ===
The First Grave Digger is the nickname of Joseph Poskitt, who appears and is co-protagonist of the Oldest Member short story "The Letter of the Law". In this tale he is described as being "[…]somewhat short-sighted and completely muscle-bound[…]as an undergraduate, he had made a name as a hammer thrower." He plays the Final of his club's President's Cup against the scheming retired solicitor, Wadsworth Hemmingway. He was "the star performer of the Wrecking Crew […] He differed from his colleagues […] in that, while they were content to peck cautiously at the ball, he never spared himself in his efforts to do it a violent injury."

The nickname "The First Grave Digger" is a reference to a character in Shakespeare's 'Hamlet', wherein (Act V, Scene 1) he sings the following callous ditty as he digs the grave of the fair Ophelia:

A pick-axe and a spade, a spade,
For an a shrouding sheet;
Oh, a pit of clay for to be made
For such a guest is meet.

=== The Man with the Hoe ===
"The Man with the Hoe" ("L'Homme à la Houe"), painted in 1861, is a famous painting by Jean-François Millet. Given the proclivities of the Wrecking Crew, Wodehouse may also have had in mind a poem inspired by Millet's work — Edwin Markham's "The Man with the Hoe," which begins

Bowed by the weight of centuries he leans
Upon his hoe and gazes on the ground,
The emptiness of ages in his face,
And on his back, the burden of the world.
Who made him dead to rapture and despair,
A thing that grieves not and that never hopes,
Stolid and stunned, a brother to the ox?
Who loosened and let down this brutal jaw?
Whose was the hand that slanted back this brow?
Whose breath blew out the light within this brain?

=== Old Father Time ===
Gaunt, white-bearded, and funereal, "Old Father Time" is the most familiar and the most ominous member of the Wrecking Crew quartet. With his hour-glass he measures out the precious hours allotted to us on earth; with the stroke of his scythe he mows us down when our hour has come. He is before us on the fairway of life.

=== Consul, the Almost Human ===
"Consul, the Almost Human" would have been familiar to many of Wodehouse's original readers as the chimpanzee famous for a vaudeville act in which he wore human clothing, dined at the table, smoked cigars, rode a bicycle, used a typewriter, roller-skated, and so on. During the final decade of the nineteenth and the first of the twentieth century, Consul appeared so often in Europe and the United States that it seems likely that there was more than one "Consul," and/or that several chimpanzees in succession were pressed into the role. The final Consul died of pleurisy while on tour in Berlin, after which his stuffed body was placed on display at the American Museum of Natural History. At the peak of his fame, according to his obituary in the New York Times (April 12, 1907), this Consul earned $1,500 per week, and had his life insured for $124,000. That he may not always have appreciated his existence as a gawked-at curiosity is suggested by the fact that on one occasion at least he took full advantage of an opportunity to fire a revolver at his trainer, only to discover that the weapon had, alas, been loaded with blank cartridges (Popular Mechanics Magazine, 1919, 593).

== Stories ==
Members of The Wrecking Crew are featured in:

- The Girl on the Boat (1922) – novel, with "Consul, the Almost-Human"
- "Chester Forgets Himself" (1923) – Oldest Member golf story, collected in The Heart of a Goof (1926)
- "The Letter of the Law" (1936) – Oldest Member golf story, collected in Lord Emsworth and Others (1937)
