= Oldest Member (character) =

Fictional character in P. G. Wodehouse stories

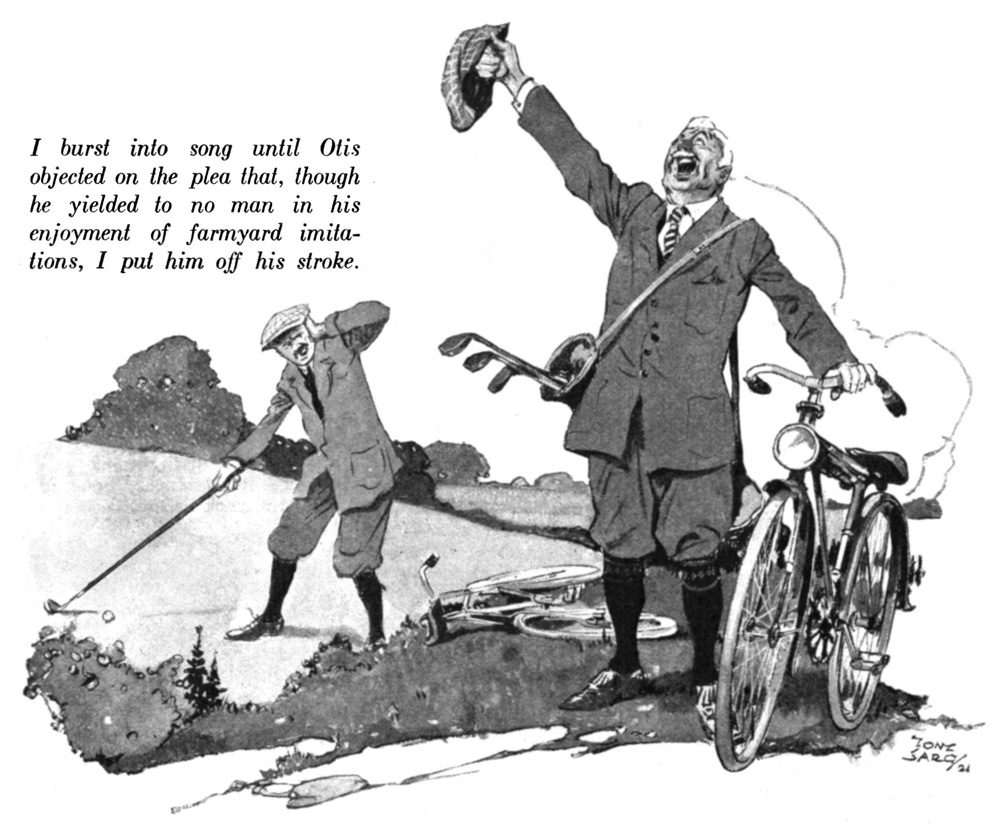
The Oldest Member (right), 1922 illustration by Tony Sarg for "The Long Hole" in McClure's Magazine

The Oldest Member (of a golf club with varying names) is a fictional character from the short stories of P. G. Wodehouse. The character debuted in the 1919 short story "the Clicking of Cuthbert", and narrates the majority of Wodehouse's golf stories from the terrace of a golf club whose location is unclear. The location and name of the club change between the stories, and between the US and UK versions of some of the stories.

The club's members enjoy having drinks in the clubhouse after a brisk eighteen holes; but they do so fully aware of the risk that the Oldest Member who, (though he has long since given up golf) has seen all and knows all, might pick up on their conversation and begin to relate a story from his experience. Though some listeners are happy (or at least not unhappy) to hear the Oldest Member's tales, these stories are sometimes told to characters who are eager to leave before the story has even started, and who occasionally fall asleep before or after the story has started. Once he has started talking, The Oldest Member cannot be stopped, and, when necessary, he will grab the arms and clothing of his unwilling audience to keep them in their seats.

== Inspiration ==
One of the club's names, Manhooset, may be a reference to Manhasset Bay in Long Island, New York. According to Wodehouse scholar N. T. P. Murphy, Wodehouse played golf at the Sound View Golf Club, which used to exist in Long Island, New York, and used it as the basis for the Oldest Member's club. Sound View is referenced in the Wodehouse 1966 short story "Life with Freddie". Wodehouse also played at the Walton Heath and Addington courses in the UK. Addington is mentioned in Wodehouse's preface to The Heart of a Goof and the course's original club house which burnt down in 1938.

== Fictional biography ==
The Oldest Member is not named in the stories. He has white hair, white eyebrows and white whiskers, and is a bachelor. He appears to be in his seventies or older, since in "The Letter of the Law", he says he went to university with his friend Joseph Poskitt, one of the Wrecking Crew, who are all described as septuagenarians in "Scratch Man". However, the Oldest Member says he attended Cambridge in "The Heel of Achilles". In that story, the Oldest Member tells of a time when he was a young man shortly after finishing his college education. At that time, he worked as the secretary and caddie of American millionaire Vincent Jopp in Chicago.

The Oldest Member's fictional golf club is given various names, including Wood Hills, Woodhaven, Marvis Bay, and Manhooset. The location of his club varies between England and the United States. For example, in "A Woman is Only a Woman", the club is in England and called the Woodhaven Golf Club in the UK version, while it is in the US and called the Manhooset Golf Club in the US version. It is called the Marvis Bay Golf and Country Club in the UK version of "Ordeal by Golf", though it is not located in Marvis Bay in the UK version of another story, "The Heart of a Goof". Fictional golf clubs other than the Oldest Member's are mentioned, including Goldenville (in "High Stakes"), Squashy Hollow (in "Sleepy Time" and other stories), and Wissahicky Glen, the club to which the Oldest Member belonged when he lived in Chicago in "The Heel of Achilles".

He usually tells his stories from his favourite chair on the terrace overlooking the ninth green, and insists on using this chair in "The Purification of Rodney Spelvin". In "Sundered Hearts", which the Oldest Member narrates on a winter evening, he has a good view of the ninth green from inside the clubhouse in the smoking-room. The Oldest Member plays a role in several stories, usually because a fellow golfer came to him for advice. The Oldest Member does not hesitate to offer helpful advice, though his suggestions sometimes have mixed results, such as in "The Salvation of George Mackintosh". In "Tangled Hearts", when discussing Smallwood Bessemer, who annoyed people by giving too much advice, the Oldest Member says to a friend, "I always advise people never to give advice."

In the story "Ordeal by Golf", it is stated that he enjoys telling stories about golf and watching matches, though he himself has not played golf "since the rubber-cored ball superseded the old dignified gutty". He teaches Mortimer Sturgis how to play golf in "A Mixed Threesome" and plays the game himself during the events of "The Salvation of George Mackintosh". Revering golf above all other games, he is shocked when golfer Ambrose Gussett sinks to the level of playing tennis in "Up from the Depths". In "The Awakening of Rollo Podmarsh", it is mentioned that he had opposed the addition of tennis courts to the club grounds and now disapproves of a new bowling green. The Oldest Member is often asked to judge matches and act as a referee, as in the story "Scratch Man" when he referees the club championship final. He sometimes reads golf books, such as Vardon on Casual Water and Wodehouse on the Niblick.

It is assumed in multiple Wodehouse reference works that there is only one character referred to as the Oldest Member. However, because of the discrepancies between the stories, J. H. C. Morris suggested in his book Thank You, Wodehouse that there are at least three characters with that title: one who attended Oxford, another who went to Cambridge (and one of these resides at Marvis Bay while the other does not), and an American one. Morris also considered the possibility that the Oldest Member is Mr. Mulliner, but dismissed this idea for multiple reasons: Mr Mulliner is rarely directly involved in his stories while the Oldest Member is more frequently part of his own stories, Mr Mulliner appears to rely on cues more than the Oldest Member does, and Mulliner's stories are more incredible than those of the Oldest Member.

== Stories ==
The Oldest Member narrates twenty-seven short stories:

- Nine of the ten stories in The Clicking of Cuthbert (1922):
  - "The Clicking of Cuthbert"
  - "A Woman is Only a Woman"
  - "A Mixed Threesome"
  - "Sundered Hearts"
  - "The Salvation of George Mackintosh"
  - "Ordeal by Golf"
  - "The Long Hole"
  - "The Heel of Achilles"
  - "The Rough Stuff"
- All nine stories in The Heart of a Goof (1926):
  - "The Heart of a Goof"
  - "High Stakes"
  - "Keeping in with Vosper"
  - "Chester Forgets Himself"
  - "The Magic Plus Fours"
  - "The Awakening of Rollo Podmarsh"
  - "Rodney Fails to Qualify"
  - "Jane Gets off the Fairway"
  - "The Purification of Rodney Spelvin"
- Three stories from Lord Emsworth and Others (1937):
  - "The Letter of the Law"
  - "Farewell to Legs"
  - "There's Always Golf"
- Five stories from Nothing Serious (1950):
  - "Up from the Depths"
  - "Feet of Clay"
  - "Excelsior"
  - "Rodney Has a Relapse"
  - "Tangled Hearts"
- A single story from A Few Quick Ones (1959):
  - "Scratch Man"
  - Also includes "Joy Bells for Walter", a reworking of "Excelsior"

Wodehouse also wrote other golf stories that are not narrated by the Oldest Member:

- "Archibald's Benefit" (in The Man Upstairs)
- "The Coming of Gowf" (in The Clicking of Cuthbert)
- "Those in Peril on the Tee" (in Mr Mulliner Speaking)
- "Sleepy Time" (in Plum Pie)
- Novels prominently featuring golf include Uneasy Money (1916), A Damsel in Distress (1919), and Doctor Sally (1932)

== Adaptations ==
The Oldest Member appeared in one of the short films in the 1924 The Clicking of Cuthbert film series. In the short film, titled "The Clicking of Cuthbert", he was portrayed by E. Ashley Marvin. The other five short films in the series were also based on golf stories by Wodehouse.

William Mervyn portrayed the Oldest Member in an episode of the television series Wodehouse Playhouse, "Rodney Fails to Qualify", which first aired in May 1975. The series also includes episodes based on "Feet of Clay" and "Tangled Hearts".

The 1991 Swedish film Den ofrivillige golfaren was inspired by Wodehouse's golf stories.

Maurice Denham starred as the Oldest Member in a series of radio adaptations of the golf stories. The series, titled The Oldest Member, aired on BBC Radio 4 between 1994 and 1999. The club is called the Prior's Heath Golf Club in the radio series.

The romantic comedy play Love on the Links was adapted from Wodehouse's golf stories. It premiered at the Salisbury Playhouse on 31 May 2018, and starred Michael Fenton Stevens as the Oldest Member. In the play, the Oldest Member's club is called the Wood Hills Golf Club.

== See also ==
- List of Wodehouse's golf stories
