= The Clicking of Cuthbert =

1922 short story collection by P. G. Wodehouse

First edition (UK)

The Clicking of Cuthbert is a collection of ten short stories by P. G. Wodehouse, all with a golfing theme. It was first published in the United Kingdom on 3 February 1922 by Herbert Jenkins Ltd of London. It was later published in the United States by George H. Doran of New York on 28 May 1924 under the title Golf Without Tears. The short stories were originally published in magazines between 1919 and 1922.

There are some slight differences between the two editions, chiefly as regards the names of characters, places, and famous golfers, which were adapted to suit the country of publication. The first story in the collection introduces the Oldest Member, a repeat Wodehouse character, who narrates all but the last story.

== Contents ==
=== "The Clicking of Cuthbert" ===
1921 illustration by Wilmot Lunt for "The Clicking of Cuthbert" in The Strand Magazine

- UK: Strand, October 1921 (as "The Unexpected Clicking of Cuthbert")
- US: Elk's Magazine, July 1922 (as "Cuthbert Unexpectedly Clicks")

As with most of the stories in the collection, the UK version of the story is set in England, while the US version is set in the United States.

Plot

The Oldest Member (of a golf club with varying names) sees a young man giving up his clubs because he thinks golf is waste of time. To show the young man that playing golf can be useful, the Oldest Member tells him the following story about Cuthbert Banks.

In the suburb of Wood Hills, there is a divide between the Cultured, the intellectuals of the Wood Hills Literary and Debating Society, and the Golfers, the members of the local golf club. Mrs Emily Smethurst, president of the literary society, wants the neighbourhood to be cultured and disapproves of the golf club. The society's meeting place is near the golf course, and their sudden applause during a novelist's lecture causes golfer J. Cuthbert Banks to accidentally hit his ball into the room onto a table. He apologetically comes in to play the ball where it lies, and falls in love with Mrs Smethurst's niece, Adeline. He eventually proposes to her but she turns him down, since she is ambitious and, feeling she is too ordinary herself to be noteworthy, wants to marry someone noteworthy. Cuthbert is a skilled golfer and won the French Open Championship the previous year, but Adeline does not consider this a noteworthy achievement. She admires Raymond Parsloe Devine, the novelist who gave the lecture. Cuthbert joins the society to please Adeline, but she continues to adore Devine.

Vladimir Brusiloff, a famous Russian writer of dreary novels, is in the country on a lecturing tour and comes to Wood Hills, to the delight of Mrs Smethurst and her society. Brusiloff, tired of giving lectures and meeting aspiring writers, is in a bad mood when Mrs Smethurst introduces him to Devine. Devine says he was greatly influenced by Russian writers named Sovietski and Nastikoff, but Brusiloff coldly remarks that they are no good, going on to declare Tolstoy and P. G. Wodehouse as "not good, but not bad". Devine's prestige in the literary society is immediately shattered and he slinks away. Adeline loses all her respect for him. Brusiloff mentions that he wants to meet the golfers Abe Mitchell and Harry Vardon. (Walter Hagen and Jock Hutchison in the US version of the story.) Cuthbert mentions that he knows them. Brusiloff recognizes Cuthbert's name and is honoured to meet him, since he won the French Open. Adeline now admires Cuthbert. She marries him and becomes a fan of golf. Devine had to leave the neighbourhood and is now writing scenarios for films in California.

As the Oldest Member is finishing the story, his listener rushes out to get back his clubs.

=== "A Woman Is Only a Woman" ===
- US: Saturday Evening Post, 7 June 1919
- UK: Strand, October 1919

In this story, the golf club is called the Woodhaven Golf Club in the Strand version, and the Manhooset Golf Club in the Saturday Evening Post version.

Plot

From the terrace in front of the golf club, the Oldest Member sees Peter Willard and James Todd playing golf together, and tells the following story about them.

Peter and James are close friends who regularly play golf together. Both have little skill at golf but greatly enjoy the game. However, their relationship becomes strained when they both fall in love with Grace Forrester. Grace seems to like them equally. Since they are always around Grace at the same time, James and Peter believe that they have got each other stymied by preventing each other from wooing her, so they agree to decide the matter with an eighteen-hole match. The loser will stay away from Grace long enough for the winner to have a chance to court her.

In their match, Peter and James play about the same, both sometimes playing well and sometimes worse. After the ninth hole, James takes a short break, claiming he needs to get a few more balls, though he is actually looking at his golf book for tips. When James joins Peter on the tenth tee, Peter announces he is forfeiting the match and says that James is free to propose to Grace. James thanks him and goes to talk to Grace, who plays tennis nearby. He talks to her in detail about golf, and is shocked when Grace says she finds golf boring and silly. James is revolted and rejoins Peter. Peter says he had spoken to Grace a few minutes before and also heard her feelings about golf. They are glad they found out in time and plan to play golf more often together. James tells Peter about his golf book and invites James to read it. They clasp hands and are close friends again.

=== "A Mixed Threesome" ===
- US: McClure's, June 1920
- UK: Strand, March 1921

Plot

A golfer at the club is annoyed by children playing on the course and says golf should only be played by adults. The Oldest Member disagrees and argues that golf, like measles, should be caught young. If not, a golfer who starts playing later in life may become too absorbed in the game too quickly. He tells the story of Mortimer Sturgis to illustrate his point.

The Oldest Member's friend Betty Weston, who plays golf, is engaged to 38-year-old Mortimer Sturgis, who is not a golfer but is amiable and has independent means. Eddie Denton, Mortimer's best friend, is an explorer and returns from Central Africa. Betty admires bravery and is fascinated by Eddie. Soon, she has fallen in love with him, and goes to the Oldest Member for advice. Eddie returns Betty's feelings but neither of them want to hurt Mortimer. The Oldest Member gets an idea. He will lie to Mortimer that Betty is a kleptomaniac so he will not want to marry her. Betty thanks the Oldest Member for his help.

Mortimer is learning golf from the Oldest Member for Betty's sake. Initially, Mortimer dislikes the game, but he begins to enjoy it after he starts playing better. The Oldest Member tells Mortimer that Betty is a kleptomaniac, but this fails to change Mortimer's opinion of her. Mortimer quickly becomes extremely devoted to golf, and as a result he spends less time with Betty. When Betty complains that he is neglecting her, Mortimer only talks more about golf. Hurt, Betty ends their engagement. Mortimer recovers quickly from this and remains focused on golf. Betty and Eddie are now happily married. Mortimer was too busy with a tournament to attend their wedding, but sent golf balls and a patent Sturgis putter as wedding gifts.

=== "Sundered Hearts" ===
- UK: Strand, December 1920
- US: McClure's, December 1920

Plot

A young man comes into the club-house, having just played golf because of his enthusiasm for the game despite the cold and snowy weather. The Oldest Member is reminded of another enthusiastic golfer, Mortimer Sturgis. The young man heard the first story about him, "A Mixed Threesome". The Oldest Member tells him another story about Mortimer.

Mortimer is now 42 years old and has a handicap of twelve. He is more passionate about golf than ever. In the winter, Mortimer goes to the sunny South of France to play golf there. At the hotel, he meets a woman with golden hair, Miss Somerset, and the two fall in love. Her left wrist is in a sling. She says she strained it playing the championship. Mortimer assumes she is Mary Somerset, champion of the Ladies' Open Golf Championship, and is thrilled to meet her. They spend more time together. When he is golfing, she vaguely suggests he give the ball a hard knock when he asks for advice, and he is delighted to have her help. She says yes when he asks if he can call her Mary. He proposes to her. She gladly accepts him, though she seems somewhat disquieted when he says he is excited to be marrying a first-class golfer.

They are quietly married a few weeks later. They spend their honeymoon in Italy and then go to Mortimer's little house near the golf course. When he asks her to play golf with him, she confesses that she deceived Mortimer. She is actually Mabel Somerset, a champion croquet player. Mary Somerset is her cousin. She did not clarify this to Mortimer because she was in love and wanted to marry him. Distraught, she disappears before Mortimer can talk to her and leaves a letter saying she wronged him and is going away somewhere. Mortimer still loves her and tries to find her by hiring private detectives and advertising in all the papers. On Christmas Eve, Mabel returns at last. She explains that she left to study golf in Scotland under a famous golfer named Tammas McMickle. Her handicap is 24. Mortimer's handicap has risen to 24. He is delighted to have her back, and happy that they will be playing golf together.

=== "The Salvation of George Mackintosh" ===
1921 illustration by E. H. Shepard for "The Salvation of George Mackintosh" in the Strand

- UK: Strand, June 1921
- US: McClure's, September 1921

Plot

The Oldest Member discusses annoying golfers who talk incessantly on the course. He tells the following story about George Mackintosh, a golfer who was very talkative before being cured.

George falls in love with Celia Tennant, but is too diffident to speak to her. He asks the Oldest Member for advice. The Oldest Member points out an advertisement in a magazine for a correspondence course on becoming a convincing talker. George decides to try out the course for a week or two and then ask for a higher salary at the law firm where he works. If this succeeds, he will continue the course. A few weeks later, George is now talkative, confident, and somewhat overbearing. He has convinced his boss to give him a raise and has also become engaged to Celia. George talks incessantly on the links, and the other players get annoyed and avoid him. Celia also becomes irritated by George's constant talking.

The Oldest Member invites Celia to play golf with him, and suggests she bring George along so they can reason with him. While the Oldest Member and Celia play golf, George talks a great deal about a variety of subjects but particularly criticizes Celia's playing. This exasperates Celia, though George does not notice. The Oldest Member, whose concentration on the game is affected by George's prattling, slices his drive into the woods on the right, and after playing another, he goes into the woods to find his ball. While searching, he hears Celia call out to him. She tells him she snapped and hit George with her niblick. Celia regrets hitting him, though he quickly recovers. She and the Oldest Member tell him what happened. He is back to normal and is amazed Celia stuck with him despite his bothersome chatting. They share an embrace. The Oldest Member concludes that it is possible but difficult to cure extremely chatty golfers.

=== "Ordeal by Golf" ===
- US: Collier's, 6 December 1919
- UK: Strand, February 1920 (as "A Kink in His Character")

In this story, the club is called the Marvis Bay Golf and Country Club in the Strand version. It is called the Manhooset Golf and Country Club and is located near New York in the Collier's version.

Plot

The Oldest Member watches a group of players struggle on the course. After one of them tries to blame his caddie for distracting him, The Oldest Member remarks that few men possess the proper golfing temperament, and is reminded of a story about Mitchell Holmes.

Mitchell is a young man employed by the Paterson Dyeing and Refining Company, of which the president is Alexander Paterson, an old friend of the Oldest Member. Mitchell is engaged to Millicent Boyd, but needs a larger salary to get married. One evening, Alexander Paterson visits the Oldest Member and asks him for advice. The treasurer of his company is retiring soon, and there are two men capable of holding the job, but he does not know which one is more trustworthy. The Oldest Member suggests that Alexander find out each man's true character by playing golf with him, without telling them it is a test. Whichever man behaves better on the links should be promoted to the position. Alexander thanks him for the idea. After he mentions the men are named Holmes and Dixon, the Oldest Member regrets having given advice before hearing the names. He is fond of Mitchell, though Mitchell is apt to lose his temper when playing golf, while Rupert Dixon is supercilious and unpleasant but suave on the golf course.

The Oldest Member tells Mitchell that Alexander Paterson will test him by playing golf with him. Millicent buys a self-improvement book about controlling emotions called Are You Your Own Master?, which is simply a collection of quotations from Marcus Aurelius sold under a different name. Alexander first tests Rupert Dixon, who does not lose his temper and wins the match. When Mitchell plays with Alexander, the Oldest Member and Millicent also come to provide moral support. Alexander plays very slowly, which irritates Mitchell. Millicent reads quotations from her book to encourage Mitchell to stay calm, which helps somewhat. However, Mitchell becomes overconfident and loses his lead, which makes him lose his temper. Millicent leaves to avoid making Mitchell nervous. Mitchell is distracted by his caddie eating an apple and loses his temper again. He concedes the match and intends to drown himself. To his surprise, Alexander stops him to offer him the position of treasurer, since he knows he can always beat Mitchell at golf just by playing slowly and making him lose his temper. As for Dixon, Alexander absolutely distrusts his calmness and silence in the face of disaster on the links; and a treasurer who "beats the boss by six and fife" is not good for business.

=== "The Long Hole" ===
- UK: Strand, August 1921
- US: McClure's, March 1922

Plot

After a young man complains about players who use rules to try to disqualify opponents, the Oldest Member says that rules must be followed and is reminded of a story. He notes that the story is similar at first to the events of "A Woman is Only a Woman", but it develops quite differently.

Ralph Bingham and Arthur Jukes (US: Rollo Bingham and Otis Jukes) are already unfriendly rivals before they meet Amanda Trivett, but once they do, they fall in love in her and despise each other. Ralph and Arthur are both skilled at golf to an equal degree, handsome, and arrogant. When neither of them attracts Amanda's attention, they believe it is because they are keeping each other from having a chance to woo her, so they agree to a contest at golf. The winner will have the chance to court Amanda without competition. The match will consist of a single long hole. They will start at dawn on the club's first tee, and hole out in the town in the doorway of the Majestic Hotel in Royal Square (US: Hotel Astor in Times Square). It is a distance of about sixteen miles, which will prevent either from winning just by being lucky. The Oldest Member disapproves, thinking freak matches like this are travesties on the sacred game, but thinks it will be historic anyway and agrees.

In the beginning of the match, Ralph gets ahead by chipping his ball aboard a boat he moored on the lake and rowing it to the other side. Arthur protests, stating the boat is a hazard, but Ralph points out that there is nothing in the rules against moving a hazard. Arthur reaches the road after Ralph and tries to play straight while covering distance. Arthur hits his ball into a car and pays the driver five pounds (US: twenty dollars) for a ride to Royal Square, planning to open the car door once he gets there and chip the ball out. Ralph does not protest, because Arthur would forfeit the match by opening the car door, since it is against the rules to tamper with a hazard. The Oldest Member realizes this and warns Arthur. At Royal Square, people on the street watch Arthur try unsuccessfully to hit his ball out of the car. Ralph and Rupert arrive. Ralph's score is close to Arthur's since a dog grabbed his ball and took it back some distance. Rupert wants breakfast before they continue, and everyone agrees. Afterwards, they find the car gone. Ralph bought it and paid the driver to take it to Glasgow (Boston in the US version). Ralph claims Arthur is disqualified since he cannot reach his ball in five minutes, while Arthur claims that Ralph is disqualified because he (jokingly) asked a bystander for golfing advice. Amanda happens to come out of the hotel. They ask Amanda to decide who was disqualified first. Amanda is not sure but she offers to ask her fiancé, who is very good at golf. Ralph and Arthur are stunned and tell her it doesn't matter.

=== "The Heel of Achilles" ===
- UK: Strand, November 1921
- US: Chicago Tribune, 11 June 1922
- US: St. Louis Globe-Democrat, 11 June 1922

Plot

The Oldest Member says that golf is an uncertain game and it is never safe to bet on any player. This leads to him telling the following story of Vincent Jopp, the American multi-millionaire, who played golf for only one season.

In the story, the Oldest Member is a young man who has just come down from Cambridge. He secures the job of secretary to Vincent Jopp and goes with him to Chicago. The Oldest Member types Jopp's appointments in a ledger and notices that Jopp wrote "Propose to Amelia" under May 3. The Oldest Member is not surprised by this, since Jopp has divorced three times. What is more remarkable is that the extremely confident Jopp also wrote "Marry Amelia" under June 1. However, on May 4, Jopp says nothing about Amelia. Instead, he asks his secretary for information on golf, including who the best professional golfer is. The Oldest Member tells him Scottish golfer Sandy McHoots won both British and American Open events last year. Jopp tells him to have McHoots brought from Scotland to Chicago to teach Jopp golf. Jopp, as confident as ever, plans to win the Amateur Championship on September 12 and marry Amelia on the 13th. He also becomes a member of the Wissahickey Glen, a club to which the Oldest Member belongs.

Jopp rapidly becomes a very skilled player. He wins smaller competitions and is considered to be the probable winner of the American Amateur Championship, held that year in Detroit. The Oldest Member accompanies his employer there as both secretary and caddie. Amelia Merridew meets the Oldest Member. She explains that Jopp asked her to marry him, but she does not want to, so she said she would marry him if he won this year's Amateur Championship, thinking it would be impossible. She asks the Oldest Member to shout at him while he is golfing to distract him, but he refuses, since he has a bet on Jopp to win. Later, he gets a telephone call from each of Jopp's former wives, who say they will be on the course tomorrow to see Jopp play the final. He mentions this to Jopp, who seems nervous for the first time. Jopp plays well until the three Mrs Jopps appear: Luella Mainprice Jopp, who talks baby-talk to her Pekingese dog, Agnes Parsons Jopp, who fusses about Jopp's health, and Jane Jukes Jopp, who makes fun of how Jopp looks wearing knickerbockers. They make Jopp anxious and he loses the match. The Oldest Member, who lost his wager on Jopp, concludes that there are no safe bets in golf.

=== "The Rough Stuff" ===
- US: Chicago Tribune, 10 October 1920
- UK: Strand, April 1921

Plot

Eunice Waters stops by the club with her baby. Eunice is married to Ramsden Waters, who is away seeing her young brother Wilberforce off on the train to school in Scotland. The Oldest Member tells the story of how Eunice and Ramsden came to be married.

Ramsden Waters is shy and plays golf by himself. One morning, a boy calls out at him while he is golfing and causes him to mis-hit a ball. The boy is Wilberforce, and he is accompanied by his older sister, the beautiful and haughty Eunice Bray. She says that Wilberforce enjoys watching golf, and for her sake, Ramsden invites Wilberforce to come round with him. He finds out from Wilberforce that Eunice is not engaged to be married. After playing golf, he returns Wilberforce to Eunice, who has been reading a novel, and she thanks him without looking up from her book. Ramsden has little hope of courting Eunice. He calls at her home, but his multiple handsome rivals take up Eunice's attention while he talks with her seaweed-collecting aunt. One day, Eunice takes up golf, mainly because her rival Kitty Manders won a small silver cup at a monthly handicap and keeps bringing it up in conversation. Eunice takes lessons and soon acquires some skill in the game. She is paired with Ramsden in the annual mixed foursomes. Ramsden looks on this as a sign and proposes to her. Eunice refuses and tells him to play well in the foursomes because she wants to win.

At the competition, their only real threat is a skilled golfer named Marcella Bingley, who is paired with the less impressive George Perkins. Like Eunice, Ramsden wants to win the competition and talks to her earnestly without any diffidence, telling her to play steadily and not try fancy shots. Eunice is surprised and annoyed by the change in Ramsden's manner. Throughout the match, Ramsden tells her how she should play. At first, she is offended and ignores him, but her feelings change when she realizes that he reminds her of the rugged, domineering heroes in the romance novels she reads. Eunice has wanted to meet such a man. She plays worse than Ramsden and is humbled. Ramsden makes a mistake and kicks Wilberforce after he laughs at him. Ramsden and Eunice lose the match, and Ramsden coldly strides off, again reminding Eunice of romance novels. That night, Ramsden is no longer affected by golf and reproaches himself for alienating Eunice. However, he gets a telephone call from her. She invites him to come see her to discuss marriage.

=== "The Coming of Gowf" ===
- UK: Strand, May 1921
- US: McClure's, June–July 1921

Plot

In the story's prologue, an author humbly approaches a regal editor and offers his historical story. The editor says the public does not want historical stories, and that the magazine needs stories with warm human interest and a strong love-motive. At the moment, the editor needs a golf story. The author says that his work is just what the editor is looking for, and presents the following story.

King Merolchazzar of Oom has heard good things about the Princess of the Outer Isles and hopes to court her. He sends her gifts and asks to meet her. She receives the gifts but simply says she will let him know later. He has not heard from her since then and is disappointed. In his gardens, he notices a Scottish gardener hitting a rounded stone with a hoe. The King asks his Grand Vizier what the man is doing. The Vizier believes it is some sort of religious ceremony done to propitiate a deity named Gowf, who is not among Oom's sixty-seven deities. The King is fascinated and learns how to play golf from the gardener. Some members of the king's court arrange for minstrels to play for him to cheer him up after being ignored by the Princess, but they only annoy the King while he is trying to hit the ball. Word spreads that the King has become an adherent of a new religion. Merolchazzar now spends most of his time on the Linx, as the outdoor temple of the new god is called. The gardener is given riches and the title of Promoter of the King's Happiness, or The Pro for short. The Grand Vizier is loyal to the King and takes to Gowf right away, but the priesthood, especially the influential High Priest of Hec, resist the new religion.

The King's half-brother, Ascobaruch, wants the King's position for himself and plots against him with the High Priest. According to their plan, the High Priest will assassinate the King while Ascobaruch is away on a trip, and Ascobaruch will become the new monarch when he returns. The High Priest goes to the Linx, but before he can do anything, the King gives him a stick and tells him to play. A month later, Ascobaruch returns from his trip and finds that golf is now widespread. After seeing the King and Vizier playing a foursome against the Pro and the Highest Priest of Hec, Ascobaruch gives up and leaves. One day, the beautiful Princess of the Outer Isles visits the King. She did not send him a message before because she was busy, her subjects having recently converted to the religion of Gowf. The King says that the same thing has happened in Oom. They bond over their love of golf and walk hand in hand into the palace.

Ultimately, the editor accepts the story. He tells his majordomo to give the man a purse of gold and then throw him out.

== Publication history ==
The book has a long dedication beginning with: "To the Immortal Memory of John Henrie and Pat Rogie". There is also a preface by Wodehouse, titled Fore!.

In The Strand Magazine (UK), E. H. Shepard illustrated "Sundered Hearts", "A Mixed Threesome", "The Rough Stuff", and "The Salvation of George Mackintosh". Wilmot Lunt illustrated "The Unexpected Clicking of Cuthbert". "Popini" illustrated "A Woman is Only a Woman". A. T. Smith illustrated "A Kink in His Character" ("Ordeal by Golf"). A. Wallis Mills illustrated "The Long Hole". Alfred Leete illustrated "The Heel of Achilles". G. Morrow illustrated "The Coming of Gowf".

In McClure's (US), May Wilson Preston illustrated "A Mixed Threesome" and "Sundered Hearts", Tony Sarg illustrated "The Long Hole" and "The Coming of Gowf", and Lee Conrey illustrated "The Salvation of George Mackintosh". "Cuthbert Unexpectedly Clicks" was illustrated by Ray Rohn in Elk's Magazine. "Ordeal by Golf" was illustrated by Wallace Morgan in Collier's. "A Woman is Only a Woman" was illustrated by M. L. Blumenthal in The Saturday Evening Post. The fifth part of A Damsel in Distress was published in the same issue.

All the stories were reprinted in The Golf Omnibus, a collection of Wodehouse's golf stories published in 1973. "The Salvation of George Mackintosh" was reprinted in P. G. Wodehouse (Methuen's Library of Humour), published in 1934. That story and "The Clicking of Cuthbert" were included in the 1939 collection Week-End Wodehouse (UK edition). "The Clicking of Cuthbert", "The Heel of Achilles", and "The Coming of Gowf" were featured in the 1960 collection The Most of P. G. Wodehouse. "The Clicking of Cuthbert" was included in Vintage Wodehouse, published in 1978. The 1983 collection Fore!, subtitled The Best of Wodehouse on Golf, was edited by D. R. Bensen and included "A Mixed Threesome", "The Salvation of George Mackintosh", "The Long Hole", "The Heel of Achilles", and "The Coming of Gowf". The 1983 Wodehouse collection Short Stories, published by the Folio Society, included "The Clicking of Cuthbert" and "The Coming of Gowf".

The 1964 anthology Par for the Course: A Golfer's Anthology, edited by Robert Cromie, included "Ordeal by Golf". "The Clicking of Cuthbert" was printed in the 1954 anthology The Complete Golfer (edited by Herbert Warren Wind), the 1958 anthology Great Stories from the World of Sport (edited by Peter Schwed and Herbert Warren Wind), the 1965 anthology Read with Me (edited by Thomas B. Costain), and the 1966 anthology Rex Lardner Selects the Best of Sports Fiction.

"The Clicking of Cuthbert" was published as a short book by Redpath Press in 1986 with illustrations by Étienne Delessert.

== Adaptations ==
Three stories in the collection—"The Clicking of Cuthbert," "Ordeal by Golf," and "The Long Hole"—were filmed in 1924 as part of a series of six films of Wodehouse golf stories, titled The Clicking of Cuthbert. Peter Haddon played Cuthbert.

A radio series titled The Oldest Member was adapted from some of Wodehouse's golf stories. Episodes included "The Clicking of Cuthbert", "A Woman is Only a Woman", "A Mixed Threesome", "Sundered Hearts", "The Salvation of George Mackintosh", "Ordeal by Golf", "The Long Hole", and "The Rough Stuff". The series aired between 1994 and 1999.

The 2018 play Love on the Links was adapted from multiple golf stories by Wodehouse.

== See also ==
- Complete list of Wodehouse's golf stories
