= P. G. Wodehouse short stories bibliography =

== Blandings Castle ==
The following 10 short stories feature Blandings Castle, its owner Lord Emsworth or members of his family. There are also 11 Blandings novels including an unfinished novel.

The short story "Life with Freddie" is not set in Blandings Castle but contains Lord Emsworth's son, Freddie Threepwood. "The Crime Wave at Blandings" was rewritten from an earlier non-Blandings story.

Title	Short story collection	UK magazine publication month	UK magazine	US magazine publication month	US magazine	Collection publication order	Original publication order
"The Custody of the Pumpkin"	Blandings Castle and Elsewhere (1935)	December 1924	The Strand Magazine	November 1924	The Saturday Evening Post	1	1
"Lord Emsworth Acts for the Best"	Blandings Castle and Elsewhere (1935)	June 1926	The Strand Magazine	June 1926	Liberty	2	2
"Pig-hoo-o-o-o-ey"	Blandings Castle and Elsewhere (1935)	August 1927	The Strand Magazine	July 1927	Liberty	3	3
"Company for Gertrude"	Blandings Castle and Elsewhere (1935)	September 1928	The Strand Magazine	October 1928	Cosmopolitan	4	4
"The Go-Getter" ("Sales Resistance")	Blandings Castle and Elsewhere (1935)	August 1931	The Strand Magazine	March 1931	Cosmopolitan	5	6
"Lord Emsworth and the Girl Friend"	Blandings Castle and Elsewhere (1935)	November 1928	The Strand Magazine	October 1928	Liberty	6	5
"The Crime Wave at Blandings"	Lord Emsworth and Others (1937)	January 1937	The Strand Magazine	October 1936	The Saturday Evening Post	7	7
"Birth of a Salesman"	Nothing Serious (1950)	–	–	March 1950	This Week	8	8
"Sticky Wicket at Blandings" ("First Aid for Freddie")	Plum Pie (1966)	April 1967	Argosy	October 1966	Playboy	9	10
"Life with Freddie"	Plum Pie (1966)	–	–	–	–	10	9

== Drones Club ==
There are 21 short stories in the Drones Club series, many of which star either Bingo Little or Freddie Widgeon. Most of the stories are told at the club amongst the members, who are referred to as Eggs, Beans and Crumpets. The stories are generally told by a Crumpet to an Egg or Bean, though four of the stories have no identified narrator: "The Fat of the Land", "Leave it to Algy", "Bingo Bans the Bomb", and "Stylish Stouts".

The US magazine version of "The Masked Troubadour" is a rewritten version titled "Reggie and the Greasy Bird". "Oofy, Freddie and the Beef Trust" was first published (as "Freddie, Oofy and the Beef Trust") in the 1949 omnibus The Best of Wodehouse.

Title	Short story collection	UK magazine publication month	UK magazine	US magazine publication month	US magazine	Collection publication order	Original publication order
"Fate" ("Compromised!")	Young Men in Spats (1936)	May 1931	The Strand Magazine	May 1931	Cosmopolitan	1	1
"Tried in the Furnace"	Young Men in Spats (1936)	September 1935	The Strand Magazine	March 1937	Cosmopolitan	2	8
"Trouble Down at Tudsleigh"	Young Men in Spats (1936)	May 1935	The Strand Magazine	May 1939	Cosmopolitan	3	6
"The Amazing Hat Mystery"	Young Men in Spats (1936)	June 1934	The Strand Magazine	August 1933	Cosmopolitan	4	2
"Goodbye to All Cats"	Young Men in Spats (1936)	December 1934	The Strand Magazine	November 1934	Cosmopolitan	5	5
"The Luck of the Stiffhams"	Young Men in Spats (1936)	March 1934	The Strand Magazine	November 1933	Cosmopolitan	6	3
"Noblesse Oblige"	Young Men in Spats (1936)	November 1934	The Strand Magazine	September 1934	Cosmopolitan	7	4
"Uncle Fred Flits By"	Young Men in Spats (1936)	December 1935	The Strand Magazine	July 1935	Redbook	8	7
"The Masked Troubadour" ("Reggie and the Greasy Bird")	Lord Emsworth and Others (1937)	December 1936	The Strand Magazine	November 1936	The Saturday Evening Post	9	9
"All's Well with Bingo"	Eggs, Beans and Crumpets (1940)	April 1937	The Strand Magazine	January 1937	The Saturday Evening Post	10	10
"Bingo and the Peke Crisis"	Eggs, Beans and Crumpets (1940)	June 1937	The Strand Magazine	May 1937	The Saturday Evening Post	11	11
"The Editor Regrets"	Eggs, Beans and Crumpets (1940)	September 1939	The Strand Magazine	July 1939	The Saturday Evening Post	12	12
"Sonny Boy"	Eggs, Beans and Crumpets (1940)	December 1939	The Strand Magazine	September 1939	The Saturday Evening Post	13	13
"The Shadow Passes"	Nothing Serious (1950)	–	–	–	–	14	17
"Bramley Is So Bracing"	Nothing Serious (1950)	December 1940	The Strand Magazine	October 1939	The Saturday Evening Post	15	14
"The Fat of the Land"	A Few Quick Ones (1959)	–	–	November 1958	This Week	16	19
"The Word in Season"	A Few Quick Ones (1959)	August 1940	Punch	September 1940	Harper's Bazaar	17	15
"Leave it to Algy" ("The Ordeal of Bingo Little")	A Few Quick Ones (1959)	May 1959	John Bull	May 1954	Bluebook	18	18
"Oofy, Freddie and the Beef Trust" ("Freddie, Oofy and the Beef Trust")	A Few Quick Ones (1959)	–	–	–	–	19	16
"Bingo Bans the Bomb"	Plum Pie (1966)	August 1965	Argosy	January 1965	Playboy	20	20
"Stylish Stouts" ("The Great Fat Uncle Contest")	Plum Pie (1966)	December 1965	London Evening Standard	April 1965	Playboy	21	21

== Golf stories ==
Featuring 31 short stories, most narrated by a golf club's Oldest Member, usually from his seat on the terrace overlooking part of the golf course. One of the golf stories, "Those in Peril on the Tee", is also a Mr Mulliner story.

The UK magazine version of "Archibald's Benefit" is a cricket story titled "Reginald's Record Knock". "Rodney Has a Relapse" was first published (as "Rupert Has a Relapse") in the Canadian magazine National Home Monthly in 1949.

Title	Short story collection	UK magazine publication month	UK magazine	US magazine publication month	US magazine	Collection publication order	Original publication order
"Archibald's Benefit" ("Reginald's Record Knock")	The Man Upstairs (1914)	July 1909	Pearson's Magazine	March 1910	Collier's	1	1
"The Clicking of Cuthbert" ("The Unexpected Clicking of Cuthbert") ("Cuthbert Unexpectedly Clicks")	The Clicking of Cuthbert (1922)	October 1921	The Strand Magazine	July 1922	Elks Magazine	2	10
"A Woman is Only a Woman"	The Clicking of Cuthbert (1922)	October 1919	The Strand Magazine	June 1919	The Saturday Evening Post	3	2
"A Mixed Threesome"	The Clicking of Cuthbert (1922)	March 1921	The Strand Magazine	June 1920	McClure's	4	4
"Sundered Hearts"	The Clicking of Cuthbert (1922)	December 1920	The Strand Magazine	December 1920	McClure's	5	6
"The Salvation of George Mackintosh"	The Clicking of Cuthbert (1922)	June 1921	The Strand Magazine	September 1921	McClure's	6	8
"Ordeal by Golf" ("A Kink in His Character")	The Clicking of Cuthbert (1922)	February 1920	The Strand Magazine	December 1919	Collier's	7	3
"The Long Hole"	The Clicking of Cuthbert (1922)	August 1921	The Strand Magazine	March 1922	McClure's	8	9
"The Heel of Achilles"	The Clicking of Cuthbert (1922)	November 1921	The Strand Magazine	June 1922	Chicago Tribune	9	11
"The Rough Stuff"	The Clicking of Cuthbert (1922)	April 1921	The Strand Magazine	October 1920	Chicago Tribune	10	5
"The Coming of Gowf"	The Clicking of Cuthbert (1922)	May 1921	The Strand Magazine	June 1921	McClure's	11	7
"The Heart of a Goof"	The Heart of a Goof (1926)	April 1924	The Strand Magazine	September 1923	Red Book	12	15
"High Stakes"	The Heart of a Goof (1926)	October 1925	The Strand Magazine	September 1925	The Saturday Evening Post	13	19
"Keeping in with Vosper"	The Heart of a Goof (1926)	March 1926	The Strand Magazine	March 1926	Liberty	14	20
"Chester Forgets Himself"	The Heart of a Goof (1926)	May 1924	The Strand Magazine	July 1923	The Saturday Evening Post	15	14
"The Magic Plus Fours" ("The Plus Fours")	The Heart of a Goof (1926)	December 1922	The Strand Magazine	January 1923	Red Book	16	12
"The Awakening of Rollo Podmarsh" ("Rollo Podmarsh Comes To")	The Heart of a Goof (1926)	January 1923	The Strand Magazine	March 1923	Red Book	17	13
"Rodney Fails to Qualify"	The Heart of a Goof (1926)	March 1924	The Strand Magazine	February 1924	The Saturday Evening Post	18	16
"Jane Gets off the Fairway"	The Heart of a Goof (1926)	November 1924	The Strand Magazine	October 1924	The Saturday Evening Post	19	17
"The Purification of Rodney Spelvin"	The Heart of a Goof (1926)	September 1925	The Strand Magazine	August 1925	The Saturday Evening Post	20	18
"Those in Peril on the Tee"	Mr Mulliner Speaking (1929)	June 1927	The Strand Magazine	May 1927	Liberty	21	21
"The Letter of the Law" ("Not Out of Distance")	Lord Emsworth and Others (1937)	April 1936	The Strand Magazine	April 1936	Redbook	22	24
"Farewell to Legs"	Lord Emsworth and Others (1937)	May 1936	The Strand Magazine	July 1935	This Week	23	22
"There's Always Golf" ("A Triple Threat Man")	Lord Emsworth and Others (1937)	March 1936	The Strand Magazine	February 1936	Redbook	24	23
"Up from the Depths"	Nothing Serious (1950)	–	–	–	–	25	30
"Feet of Clay" ("A Slightly Broken Romance")	Nothing Serious (1950)	–	–	June 1950	This Week	26	29
"Excelsior" ("The Hazards of Horace Bewstridge")	Nothing Serious (1950)	–	–	July 1948	Argosy	27	26
"Rodney Has a Relapse" ("Rupert Has a Relapse")	Nothing Serious (1950)	–	–	–	–	28	28
"Tangled Hearts" ("I'll Give You Some Advice")	Nothing Serious (1950)	–	–	September 1948	Cosmopolitan	29	27
"Scratch Man" ("Tee for Two")	A Few Quick Ones (1959)	September 1940	The Strand Magazine	January 1940	The Saturday Evening Post	30	25
"Sleepy Time" ("The Battle of Squashy Hollow")	Plum Pie (1966)	October 1965	Argosy	June 1965	The Saturday Evening Post	31	31

== Jeeves ==
The following 35 short stories feature Drones Club member Bertie Wooster and his valet, Jeeves. There are also 11 Jeeves novels. Fourteen of the chapters in The Inimitable Jeeves were derived by splitting seven previously published short stories.

Four of the stories in Carry On, Jeeves (1925) are slightly revised versions of Jeeves stories originally published in the UK-only collection My Man Jeeves (1919). "Fixing it for Freddie" and "Jeeves Makes an Omelette" are rewritten versions of Reggie Pepper stories published in My Man Jeeves.

Title	Short story collection	UK magazine publication month	UK magazine	US magazine publication month	US magazine	Collection publication order	Original publication order
"Extricating Young Gussie"	The Man with Two Left Feet (1917)	January 1916	The Strand Magazine	September 1915	The Saturday Evening Post	1	1
"The Artistic Career of Corky" ("Leave it to Jeeves")	My Man Jeeves (1919); Carry On, Jeeves (1925)	June 1916	The Strand Magazine	February 1916	The Saturday Evening Post	2	2
"Jeeves and the Unbidden Guest"	My Man Jeeves (1919); Carry On, Jeeves (1925)	March 1917	The Strand Magazine	December 1916	The Saturday Evening Post	3	5
"Jeeves and the Hard-boiled Egg"	My Man Jeeves (1919); Carry On, Jeeves (1925)	August 1917	The Strand Magazine	March 1917	The Saturday Evening Post	4	6
"The Aunt and the Sluggard"	My Man Jeeves (1919); Carry On, Jeeves (1925)	August 1916	The Strand Magazine	April 1916	The Saturday Evening Post	5	3
"Jeeves in the Springtime"	The Inimitable Jeeves (1923)	December 1921	The Strand Magazine	December 1921	Cosmopolitan	6	8
"Aunt Agatha Takes the Count" ("Aunt Agatha Makes a Bloomer")	The Inimitable Jeeves (1923)	April 1922	The Strand Magazine	October 1922	Cosmopolitan	7	11
"Scoring off Jeeves" ("Bertie Gets Even")	The Inimitable Jeeves (1923)	February 1922	The Strand Magazine	March 1922	Cosmopolitan	8	9
"Sir Roderick Comes to Lunch" ("Jeeves the Blighter")	The Inimitable Jeeves (1923)	March 1922	The Strand Magazine	April 1922	Cosmopolitan	9	10
"Jeeves and the Chump Cyril"	The Inimitable Jeeves (1923)	August 1918	The Strand Magazine	June 1918	The Saturday Evening Post	10	7
"Comrade Bingo"	The Inimitable Jeeves (1923)	May 1922	The Strand Magazine	May 1922	Cosmopolitan	11	12
"The Great Sermon Handicap"	The Inimitable Jeeves (1923)	June 1922	The Strand Magazine	June 1922	Cosmopolitan	12	13
"The Purity of the Turf"	The Inimitable Jeeves (1923)	July 1922	The Strand Magazine	July 1922	Cosmopolitan	13	14
"The Metropolitan Touch"	The Inimitable Jeeves (1923)	September 1922	The Strand Magazine	September 1922	Cosmopolitan	14	16
"The Delayed Exit of Claude and Eustace"	The Inimitable Jeeves (1923)	October 1922	The Strand Magazine	November 1922	Cosmopolitan	15	17
"Bingo and the Little Woman"	The Inimitable Jeeves (1923)	November 1922	The Strand Magazine	December 1922	Cosmopolitan	16	18
"Jeeves Takes Charge"	Carry On, Jeeves (1925)	April 1923	The Strand Magazine	November 1916	The Saturday Evening Post	17	4
"The Rummy Affair of Old Biffy"	Carry On, Jeeves (1925)	October 1924	The Strand Magazine	September 1924	The Saturday Evening Post	18	19
"Without the Option"	Carry On, Jeeves (1925)	July 1925	The Strand Magazine	June 1925	The Saturday Evening Post	19	21
"Fixing it for Freddie"	Carry On, Jeeves (1925)	–	–	–	–	20	22
"Clustering Round Young Bingo"	Carry On, Jeeves (1925)	April 1925	The Strand Magazine	February 1925	The Saturday Evening Post	21	20
"Bertie Changes His Mind"	Carry On, Jeeves (1925)	August 1922	The Strand Magazine	August 1922	Cosmopolitan	22	15
"Jeeves and the Impending Doom"	Very Good, Jeeves (1930)	December 1926	The Strand Magazine	January 1927	Liberty	23	24
"The Inferiority Complex of Old Sippy"	Very Good, Jeeves (1930)	April 1926	The Strand Magazine	April 1926	Liberty	24	23
"Jeeves and the Yule-tide Spirit"	Very Good, Jeeves (1930)	December 1927	The Strand Magazine	December 1927	Liberty	25	25
"Jeeves and the Song of Songs" ("The Song of Songs")	Very Good, Jeeves (1930)	September 1929	The Strand Magazine	September 1929	Cosmopolitan	26	26
"Episode of the Dog McIntosh" ("Jeeves and the Dog McIntosh") ("The Borrowed Dog")	Very Good, Jeeves (1930)	October 1929	The Strand Magazine	October 1929	Cosmopolitan	27	27
"The Spot of Art" ("Jeeves and the Spot of Art")	Very Good, Jeeves (1930)	December 1929	The Strand Magazine	December 1929	Cosmopolitan	28	29
"Jeeves and the Kid Clementina"	Very Good, Jeeves (1930)	January 1930	The Strand Magazine	January 1930	Cosmopolitan	29	30
"The Love That Purifies" ("Jeeves and the Love That Purifies")	Very Good, Jeeves (1930)	November 1929	The Strand Magazine	November 1929	Cosmopolitan	30	28
"Jeeves and the Old School Chum"	Very Good, Jeeves (1930)	February 1930	The Strand Magazine	February 1930	Cosmopolitan	31	31
"Indian Summer of an Uncle"	Very Good, Jeeves (1930)	March 1930	The Strand Magazine	March 1930	Cosmopolitan	32	32
"The Ordeal of Young Tuppy" ("Tuppy Changes His Mind")	Very Good, Jeeves (1930)	April 1930	The Strand Magazine	April 1930	Cosmopolitan	33	33
"Jeeves Makes an Omelette" ("Jeeves and the Stolen Venus")	A Few Quick Ones (1959)	February 1959	Lilliput	August 1959	Ellery Queen's Mystery Magazine	34	34
"Jeeves and the Greasy Bird"	Plum Pie (1966)	January 1967	Argosy	December 1965	Playboy	35	35

== Mr. Mulliner ==
The following 40 short stories are narrated by raconteur Mr. Mulliner, a fisherman who tells all the stories at a pub called the Angler's Rest. One of the stories, "Those in Peril on the Tee", is also a golf story. "George and Alfred" was rewritten from an earlier Reggie Pepper story. Multiple stories in this list were originally not told by Mr. Mulliner in their magazine versions, but were revised to have a Mr. Mulliner frame when published in a short story collection.

Title	Short story collection	UK magazine publication month	UK magazine	US magazine publication month	US magazine	Collection publication order	Original publication order
"The Truth About George"	Meet Mr. Mulliner (1927)	July 1926	The Strand Magazine	July 1926	Liberty	1	4
"A Slice of Life"	Meet Mr. Mulliner (1927)	August 1926	The Strand Magazine	August 1926	Liberty	2	5
"Mulliner's Buck-U-Uppo"	Meet Mr. Mulliner (1927)	November 1926	The Strand Magazine	September 1926	Liberty	3	6
"The Bishop's Move"	Meet Mr. Mulliner (1927)	September 1927	The Strand Magazine	August 1927	Liberty	4	11
"Came the Dawn"	Meet Mr. Mulliner (1927)	July 1927	The Strand Magazine	June 1927	Liberty	5	10
"The Story of William" ("It Was Only a Fire")	Meet Mr. Mulliner (1927)	May 1927	The Strand Magazine	April 1927	Liberty	6	8
"Portrait of a Disciplinarian"	Meet Mr. Mulliner (1927)	October 1927	The Strand Magazine	September 1927	Liberty	7	12
"The Romance of a Bulb-Squeezer"	Meet Mr. Mulliner (1927)	March 1927	The Strand Magazine	March 1927	Liberty	8	7
"Honeysuckle Cottage"	Meet Mr. Mulliner (1927)	February 1925	The Strand Magazine	January 1925	The Saturday Evening Post	9	2
"The Reverent Wooing of Archibald"	Mr. Mulliner Speaking (1929)	August 1928	The Strand Magazine	September 1928	Cosmopolitan	10	14
"The Man Who Gave Up Smoking"	Mr. Mulliner Speaking (1929)	March 1929	The Strand Magazine	March 1929	Liberty	11	17
"The Story of Cedric"	Mr. Mulliner Speaking (1929)	May 1929	The Strand Magazine	May 1929	Liberty	12	18
"The Ordeal of Osbert Mulliner"	Mr. Mulliner Speaking (1929)	December 1928	The Strand Magazine	November 1928	Liberty	13	15
"Unpleasantness at Bludleigh Court"	Mr. Mulliner Speaking (1929)	February 1929	The Strand Magazine	February 1929	Liberty	14	16
"Those in Peril on the Tee"	Mr. Mulliner Speaking (1929)	June 1927	The Strand Magazine	May 1927	Liberty	15	9
"Something Squishy"	Mr. Mulliner Speaking (1929)	January 1925	The Strand Magazine	December 1924	The Saturday Evening Post	16	1
"The Awful Gladness of the Mater"	Mr. Mulliner Speaking (1929)	May 1925	The Strand Magazine	March 1925	The Saturday Evening Post	17	3
"The Passing of Ambrose"	Mr. Mulliner Speaking (1929)	July 1928	The Strand Magazine	August 1928	Cosmopolitan	18	13
"The Smile That Wins"	Mulliner Nights (1933)	February 1932	The Strand Magazine	October 1931	The American Magazine	19	22
"The Story of Webster" ("The Bishop's Cat")	Mulliner Nights (1933)	May 1932	The Strand Magazine	February 1932	The American Magazine	20	25
"Cats will be Cats" ("The Bishop's Folly")	Mulliner Nights (1933)	June 1932	The Strand Magazine	March 1932	The American Magazine	21	26
"The Knightly Quest of Mervyn" ("Quest")	Mulliner Nights (1933)	July 1931	The Strand Magazine	April 1931	Cosmopolitan	22	21
"The Voice from the Past"	Mulliner Nights (1933)	December 1931	The Strand Magazine	November 1931	The American Magazine	23	23
"Open House"	Mulliner Nights (1933)	April 1932	The Strand Magazine	April 1932	The American Magazine	24	27
"Best Seller"	Mulliner Nights (1933)	July 1930	The Strand Magazine	June 1930	Cosmopolitan	25	20
"Strychnine in the Soup" ("The Missing Mystery")	Mulliner Nights (1933)	March 1932	The Strand Magazine	December 1931	The American Magazine	26	24
"Gala Night"	Mulliner Nights (1933)	June 1930	The Strand Magazine	May 1930	Cosmopolitan	27	19
"Monkey Business" ("A Cagey Gorilla")	Blandings Castle and Elsewhere (1935)	December 1932	The Strand Magazine	December 1932	The American Magazine	28	28
"The Nodder" ("Love Birds")	Blandings Castle and Elsewhere (1935)	January 1933	The Strand Magazine	January 1933	The American Magazine	29	29
"The Juice of an Orange" ("Love on a Diet")	Blandings Castle and Elsewhere (1935)	February 1933	The Strand Magazine	February 1933	The American Magazine	30	30
"The Rise of Minna Nordstrom" ("A Star is Born")	Blandings Castle and Elsewhere (1935)	April 1933	The Strand Magazine	March 1933	The American Magazine	31	31
"The Castaways"	Blandings Castle and Elsewhere (1935)	June 1933	The Strand Magazine	–	–	32	32
"Archibald and the Masses"	Young Men in Spats (1936)	February 1936	The Strand Magazine	August 1935	Cosmopolitan	33	35
"The Code of the Mulliners"	Young Men in Spats (1936)	April 1935	The Strand Magazine	February 1935	Cosmopolitan	34	34
"The Fiery Wooing of Mordred"	Young Men in Spats (1936)	February 1935	The Strand Magazine	December 1934	Cosmopolitan	35	33
"Buried Treasure" ("Hidden Treasure")	Lord Emsworth and Others (1937)	September 1936	The Strand Magazine	September 1936	This Week	36	36
"Anselm Gets His Chance"	Eggs, Beans and Crumpets (1940)	July 1937	The Strand Magazine	July 1937	The Saturday Evening Post	37	37
"The Right Approach"	A Few Quick Ones (1959)	September 1958	Lilliput	January 1959	Playboy	38	39
"Big Business"	A Few Quick Ones (1959)	March 1953	Lilliput	December 1952	Collier's	39	38
"George and Alfred"	Plum Pie (1966)	–	–	January 1967	Playboy	40	40

== School stories ==
The following list includes 37 school stories written by Wodehouse. Most of the stories were not published in US periodicals. The fictional school at which each story takes place is noted. Some stories seem to have been rewritten with a different location for later republication. Several of Wodehouse's early novels are also set at schools, and multiple characters in the short stories also appear in one or two of the novels. The Pothunters is set at St Austin's, A Prefect's Uncle at Beckford, The Gold Bat and The White Feather at Wrykyn, The Head of Kay's at Eckleton, and Mike at Wrykyn and Sedleigh.

Each of the stories was published either in Tales of St. Austin's (1903) or later in the book Tales of Wrykyn and Elsewhere (1997). Some of the short stories in Tales of Wrykyn and Elsewhere had previously been published in The Uncollected Wodehouse (US, 1976), The Swoop! and Other Stories (US, 1979), or Plum Stones (UK, 1993).

Title	Short story collection	UK magazine publication month	UK magazine	School	Collection publication order	Original publication order
"How Pillingshot Scored"	Tales of St. Austin's (1903)	May 1903	The Captain	St. Austin's	1	13
"The Odd Trick"	Tales of St. Austin's (1903)	August 1902	The Captain	St. Austin's	2	9
"L'Affaire Uncle John"	Tales of St. Austin's (1903)	August 1901	Public School Magazine	St. Austin's	3	2
"Harrison's Slight Error"	Tales of St. Austin's (1903)	January 1903	The Captain	St. Austin's	4	12
"Bradshaw's Little Story"	Tales of St. Austin's (1903)	July 1902	The Captain	St. Austin's	5	8
"A Shocking Affair"	Tales of St. Austin's (1903)	–	–	St. Austin's	6	15
"The Babe and the Dragon"	Tales of St. Austin's (1903)	February 1902	The Captain	St. Austin's	7	5
"The Manoeuvres of Charteris"	Tales of St. Austin's (1903)	August 1903	The Captain	St. Austin's	8	14
"How Payne Bucked Up"	Tales of St. Austin's (1903)	October 1902	The Captain	St. Austin's	9	10
"Author!"	Tales of St. Austin's (1903)	October 1901	Public School Magazine	St. Austin's	10	3
"The Tabby Terror"	Tales of St. Austin's (1903)	February 1902	Public School Magazine	St. Austin's	11	6
"The Prize Poem"	Tales of St. Austin's (1903)	July 1901	Public School Magazine	St. Austin's	12	1
"Jackson's Extra"	Tales of Wrykyn and Elsewhere (1997)	June 1904	The Royal Magazine	Wrykyn	13	16
"Homœopathic Treatment"	Tales of Wrykyn and Elsewhere (1997)	August 1904	The Royal Magazine	Wrykyn	14	17
"The Reformation of Study Sixteen"	Tales of Wrykyn and Elsewhere (1997)	November 1904	The Royal Magazine	Wrykyn	15	20
"Ruthless Reginald"	Tales of Wrykyn and Elsewhere (1997)	April 1905	The Captain	Wrykyn	16	23
"The Politeness of Princes"	Tales of Wrykyn and Elsewhere (1997)	May 1905	The Captain	Wrykyn	17	24
"Shields' and the Cricket Cup"	Tales of Wrykyn and Elsewhere (1997)	June 1905	The Captain	Wrykyn	18	25
"An Affair of Boats"	Tales of Wrykyn and Elsewhere (1997)	July 1905	The Captain	Wrykyn	19	26
"The Last Place"	Tales of Wrykyn and Elsewhere (1997)	August 1905	The Captain	Wrykyn	20	27
"An International Affair"	Tales of Wrykyn and Elsewhere (1997)	September 1905	The Captain	Wrykyn	21	29
"The Deserter"	Tales of Wrykyn and Elsewhere (1997)	August 1905	The Royal Magazine	Wrykyn	22	28
"A Division of Spoil"	Tales of Wrykyn and Elsewhere (1997)	September 1906	The Captain	Wrykyn	23	31
"Educating Aubrey"	Tales of Wrykyn and Elsewhere (1997)	May 1911	The London Magazine	Wrykyn	24	37
"The Strange Disappearance of Mr Buxton-Smythe"	Tales of Wrykyn and Elsewhere (1997)	December 1901	Public School Magazine	St. Asterisk's	25	4
"The Adventure of the Split Infinitive"	Tales of Wrykyn and Elsewhere (1997)	March 1902	Public School Magazine	St. Asterisk's	26	7
"Welch's Mile Record"	Tales of Wrykyn and Elsewhere (1997)	November 1902	The Captain	St. Austin's	27	11
"Pillingshot, Detective"	Tales of Wrykyn and Elsewhere (1997)	September 1910	The Captain	St. Austin's	28	35
"Pillingshot's Paper"	Tales of Wrykyn and Elsewhere (1997)	February 1911	The Captain	St. Austin's	29	36
"An Afternoon Dip"	Tales of Wrykyn and Elsewhere (1997)	September 1904	Pearson's Magazine	Locksley	30	19
"A Corner in Lines"	Tales of Wrykyn and Elsewhere (1997)	January 1905	Pearson's Magazine	Locksley	31	21
"The Autograph Hunters"	Tales of Wrykyn and Elsewhere (1997)	February 1905	Pearson's Magazine	St. Austin's/Locksley	32	22
"Playing the Game"	Tales of Wrykyn and Elsewhere (1997)	May 1906	Pearson's Magazine	Locksley	33	30
"Blenkinsop's Benefit"	Tales of Wrykyn and Elsewhere (1997)	August 1904	The Captain	Beckford/Locksley	34	18
"Personally Conducted"	Tales of Wrykyn and Elsewhere (1997)	July 1907	Cassell's Magazine	Beckford/Locksley	35	32
"The Guardian"	Tales of Wrykyn and Elsewhere (1997)	September 1908	The Windsor Magazine	Eckleton	36	33
"Stone and the Weed"	Tales of Wrykyn and Elsewhere (1997)	May 1910	The Captain	Sedleigh	37	34

== Ukridge ==
In addition to the following 19 short stories, Stanley Featherstonehaugh Ukridge also appears in a single full-length novel, Love Among the Chickens (1906).

Title	Short story collection	UK magazine publication month	UK magazine	US magazine publication month	US magazine	Collection publication order	Original publication order
"Ukridge's Dog College"	Ukridge (1924)	May 1923	The Strand Magazine	April 1923	Cosmopolitan	1	1
"Ukridge's Accident Syndicate" ("Ukridge, Teddy Weeks and the Tomato")	Ukridge (1924)	June 1923	The Strand Magazine	May 1923	Cosmopolitan	2	2
"The Debut of Battling Billson"	Ukridge (1924)	July 1923	The Strand Magazine	June 1923	Cosmopolitan	3	3
"First Aid for Dora"	Ukridge (1924)	August 1923	The Strand Magazine	July 1923	Cosmopolitan	4	4
"The Return of Battling Billson"	Ukridge (1924)	September 1923	The Strand Magazine	August 1923	Cosmopolitan	5	5
"Ukridge Sees Her Through"	Ukridge (1924)	October 1923	The Strand Magazine	September 1923	Cosmopolitan	6	6
"No Wedding Bells for Him"	Ukridge (1924)	November 1923	The Strand Magazine	October 1923	Cosmopolitan	7	7
"The Long Arm of Looney Coote"	Ukridge (1924)	December 1923	The Strand Magazine	November 1923	Cosmopolitan	8	8
"The Exit of Battling Billson"	Ukridge (1924)	January 1924	The Strand Magazine	December 1923	Cosmopolitan	9	9
"Ukridge Rounds a Nasty Corner"	Ukridge (1924)	February 1924	The Strand Magazine	January 1924	Cosmopolitan	10	10
"Ukridge and the Home from Home"	Lord Emsworth and Others (1937)	June 1931	The Strand Magazine	February 1931	Cosmopolitan	11	15
"The Come-back of Battling Billson"	Lord Emsworth and Others (1937)	July 1935	The Strand Magazine	June 1935	Cosmopolitan	12	16
"The Level Business Head"	Lord Emsworth and Others (1937)	May 1926	The Strand Magazine	May 1926	Liberty	13	13
"A Bit of Luck for Mabel"	Eggs, Beans and Crumpets (1940)	January 1926	The Strand Magazine	December 1925	The Saturday Evening Post	14	12
"Buttercup Day"	Eggs, Beans and Crumpets (1940)	December 1925	The Strand Magazine	November 1925	The Saturday Evening Post	15	11
"Ukridge and the Old Stepper"	Eggs, Beans and Crumpets (1940)	June 1928	The Strand Magazine	June 1928	Liberty	16	14
"Success Story" ("Ukie Invests in Human Nature")	Nothing Serious (1950)	–	–	March 1947	Argosy	17	17
"A Tithe for Charity"	A Few Quick Ones (1959)	–	–	April 1955	Playboy	18	18
"Ukridge Starts a Bank Account"	Plum Pie (1966)	–	–	July 1967	Playboy	19	19

== Miscellaneous stories ==
The following is a list of short stories by Wodehouse that are not part of one of the main series but were published in a collection of short stories by Wodehouse. Several of these stories were to some extent rewritten from or into other Wodehouse stories, as noted in the list. Wodehouse also wrote other stories that were only published in magazines.

Some of the books listed below, such as The Man Upstairs and A Man of Means, were originally only published in the UK, while others such as The Uncollected Wodehouse and The Eighteen-Carat Kid and Other Stories were originally only published in the US. Some stories were published in more than one of these collections. The stories are listed below with the first short story collection they were published in.

The six stories collected in A Man of Means were written in collaboration by Wodehouse and C. H. Bovill.

Title	Earliest story collection	UK magazine publication month	UK magazine	US magazine publication month	US magazine	Series	Collection publication order	Original publication order
"The Man Upstairs"	The Man Upstairs (1914)	March 1910	The Strand Magazine	March 1910	Cosmopolitan	–	1	18
"Something to Worry About"	The Man Upstairs (1914)	February 1913	The Strand Magazine	March 1913	Metropolitan Magazine	–	2	39
"Deep Waters"	The Man Upstairs (1914)	June 1910	The Strand Magazine	May 1910	Collier's	–	3	20
"When Doctors Disagree"	The Man Upstairs (1914)	December 1910	The Strand Magazine	March 1911	Success	–	4	26
"By Advice of Counsel"	The Man Upstairs (1914)	July 1910	The Strand Magazine	September 1910	Pictorial Review	–	5	22
"Rough-Hew Them How We Will"	The Man Upstairs (1914)	April 1910	The Strand Magazine	August 1910	Cosmopolitan	–	6	19
"The Man Who Disliked Cats" ("The Fatal Kink in Algernon")	The Man Upstairs (1914)	May 1912	The Strand Magazine	January 1916	Ladies' Home Journal	–	7	33
"Ruth in Exile"	The Man Upstairs (1914)	July 1912	The Strand Magazine	August 1912	Ainslee's Magazine	–	8	35
"The Man, the Maid and the Miasma"	The Man Upstairs (1914)	February 1910	The Grand Magazine	June 1910	Cosmopolitan	–	9	16
"The Good Angel" ("The Matrimonial Sweepstakes")	The Man Upstairs (1914)	February 1910	The Strand Magazine	February 1910	Cosmopolitan	Keggs	10	17
"Pots o' Money"	The Man Upstairs (1914)	December 1911	The Strand Magazine	February 1912	Metropolitan Magazine	–	11	31
"Out of School"	The Man Upstairs (1914)	October 1910	The Strand Magazine	September 1909	Ainslee's Magazine	–	12	14
"Three From Dunsterville"	The Man Upstairs (1914)	August 1911	The Strand Magazine	August 1912	Pictorial Review	–	13	29
"The Tuppenny Millionaire"	The Man Upstairs (1914)	October 1912	The Strand Magazine	–	–	–	14	36
"Ahead of Schedule"	The Man Upstairs (1914)	November 1910	The Grand Magazine	January 1911	Collier's	–	15	25
"Sir Agravaine"	The Man Upstairs (1914)	December 1912	Pearson's Magazine	June 1912	Collier's	–	16	34
"The Goal-Keeper and the Plutocrat" ("The Pitcher and the Plutocrat")	The Man Upstairs (1914)	January 1912	The Strand Magazine	September 1910	Collier's	–	17	24
"In Alcala"	The Man Upstairs (1914)	December 1911	The London Magazine	November 1909	People's Magazine	–	18	15
"Bill the Bloodhound"	The Man with Two Left Feet (1917)	April 1915	The Strand Magazine	February 1915	The Century Magazine	–	19	53
"Wilton's Holiday" ("Wilton's Vacation")	The Man with Two Left Feet (1917)	July 1915	The Strand Magazine	March 1916	Illustrated Sunday Magazine	–	20	58
"The Mixer: He Meets a Shy Gentleman" ("A Very Shy Gentleman")	The Man with Two Left Feet (1917)	November 1915	The Strand Magazine	June 1916	The Red Book Magazine	–	21	60
"The Mixer: He Moves in Society" ("Breaking into Society")	The Man with Two Left Feet (1917)	December 1915	The Strand Magazine	July 1916	The Red Book Magazine	–	22	61
"Crowned Heads"	The Man with Two Left Feet (1917)	April 1915	Pearson's Magazine	June 1914	The Argosy	–	23	43
"At Geisenheimer's" ("The Love-r-ly Silver Cup")	The Man with Two Left Feet (1917)	October 1915	The Strand Magazine	August 1915	The Saturday Evening Post	–	24	59
"The Making of Mac's" ("The Romance of 'Mac's'")	The Man with Two Left Feet (1917)	May 1915	The Strand Magazine	May 1916	The Red Book Magazine	–	25	56
"One Touch of Nature" ("Brother Fans")	The Man with Two Left Feet (1917)	–	–	August 1914	McClure's	–	26	46
"Black for Luck" ("A Black Cat for Luck")	The Man with Two Left Feet (1917)	June 1915	The Strand Magazine	July 1915	The Red Book Magazine	–	27	57
"The Romance of an Ugly Policeman"	The Man with Two Left Feet (1917)	January 1915	The Strand Magazine	April 1915	Ainslee's Magazine	–	28	52
"A Sea of Troubles"	The Man with Two Left Feet (1917)	June 1915	Pearson's Magazine	September 1914	McClure's	–	29	48
"The Man with Two Left Feet"	The Man with Two Left Feet (1917)	May 1916	The Strand Magazine	March 1916	The Saturday Evening Post	–	30	63
"Absent Treatment"	My Man Jeeves (1919)	March 1911	The Strand Magazine	August 1911	Collier's	Reggie Pepper	31	27
"Helping Freddie" ("Lines and Business") (rewritten as "Fixing it for Freddie")	My Man Jeeves (1919)	September 1911	The Strand Magazine	March 1912	Pictorial Review	Reggie Pepper	32	30
"Rallying Round Old George" ("Brother Alfred") (rewritten as "George and Alfred")	My Man Jeeves (1919)	December 1912	The Strand Magazine	September 1913	Collier's	Reggie Pepper	33	37
"Doing Clarence a Bit of Good" ("Rallying Round Clarence") (rewritten as "Jeeves Makes an Omelette")	My Man Jeeves (1919)	May 1913	The Strand Magazine	April 1914	Pictorial Review	Reggie Pepper	34	40
"The Man Who Married an Hotel"	Indiscretions of Archie (1921)	March 1920	The Strand Magazine	May 1920	Cosmopolitan	Archie Moffam	35	64
"Archie and the Sausage Chappie"	Indiscretions of Archie (1921)	April 1920	The Strand Magazine	June 1920	Cosmopolitan	Archie Moffam	36	66
"Dear Old Squiffy"	Indiscretions of Archie (1921)	May 1920	The Strand Magazine	July 1920	Cosmopolitan	Archie Moffam	37	67
"Doing Father a Bit of Good"	Indiscretions of Archie (1921)	June 1920	The Strand Magazine	August 1920	Cosmopolitan	Archie Moffam	38	68
"Paving the Way for Mabel"	Indiscretions of Archie (1921)	July 1920	The Strand Magazine	September 1920	Cosmopolitan	Archie Moffam	39	69
"Washy Makes His Presence Felt"	Indiscretions of Archie (1921)	August 1920	The Strand Magazine	October 1920	Cosmopolitan	Archie Moffam	40	70
"A Room at the Hermitage" ("A Bit of All Right")	Indiscretions of Archie (1921)	September 1920	The Strand Magazine	November 1920	Cosmopolitan	Archie Moffam	41	71
"First Aid For Looney Biddle"	Indiscretions of Archie (1921)	October 1920	The Strand Magazine	December 1920	Cosmopolitan	Archie Moffam	42	72
"Mother's Knee"	Indiscretions of Archie (1921)	November 1920	The Strand Magazine	January 1921	Cosmopolitan	Archie Moffam	43	73
"Strange Experience of an Artist's Model"	Indiscretions of Archie (1921)	January 1921	The Strand Magazine	–	–	Archie Moffam	44	74
"The Wigmore Venus" (rewrite of "Doing Clarence a Bit of Good")	Indiscretions of Archie (1921)	February 1921	The Strand Magazine	February 1921	Cosmopolitan	Archie Moffam	45	75
"Mr Potter Takes a Rest Cure" ("The Rest Cure")	Blandings Castle and Elsewhere (1935)	February 1926	The Strand Magazine	January 1926	Liberty	Bobbie Wickham	46	76
"Romance at Droitgate Spa"	Eggs, Beans and Crumpets (1940)	August 1937	The Strand Magazine	February 1937	The Saturday Evening Post	–	47	78
"How's That, Umpire?"	Nothing Serious (1950)	–	–	–	–	–	48	81
"Joy Bells for Walter" ("Keep Your Temper, Walter") (rewrite of "Excelsior")	A Few Quick Ones (1959)	February 1957	John Bull	October 1956	This Week	–	49	83
"Unpleasantness at Kozy Kot" (rewrite of "Fixing it for Freddie")	A Few Quick Ones (US, 1959)	–	–	–	–	–	50	85
"A Good Cigar Is a Smoke"	Plum Pie (1966)	–	–	December 1967	Playboy	–	51	87
"Another Christmas Carol"	The World of Mr Mulliner (1972)	–	–	December 1970	Playboy	–	52	88
"From a Detective's Notebook"	The World of Mr Mulliner (1972)	May 1959	Punch	February 1960	Escapade	–	53	86
"When Papa Swore in Hindustani"	The Uncollected Wodehouse (1976)	August 1901	Answers	–	–	–	54	1
"Tom, Dick–and Harry"	The Uncollected Wodehouse (1976)	June 1905	The Grand Magazine	–	–	–	55	2
"Misunderstood"	The Uncollected Wodehouse (1976)	May 1910	Nash's Magazine	May 1910	Burr McIntosh Monthly	–	56	21
"The Best Sauce" ("The Dinner of Herbs")	The Uncollected Wodehouse (1976)	July 1911	The Strand Magazine	February 1913	Pictorial Review	–	57	28
"Death at the Excelsior" ("The Education of Detective Oakes") ("The Harmonica Mystery")	The Uncollected Wodehouse (1976)	December 1914	Pearson's Magazine	March 1915	All-Story Cavalier Weekly	–	58	51
"The Test Case"	The Uncollected Wodehouse (1976)	December 1915	Pearson's Magazine	December 1915	Illustrated Sunday Magazine	Reggie Pepper	59	62
"The Wire-Pullers"	The Eighteen-Carat Kid and Other Stories (1980)	July 1905	The Strand Magazine	August 1905	The Strand Magazine (US)	Joan Romney	60	3
"The Episode of the Landlady's Daughter"	A Man of Means (1991)	April 1914	The Strand Magazine	May 1916	Pictorial Review	Roland Bleke	61	41
"The Episode of the Financial Napoleon" ("The Bolt From the Blue")	A Man of Means (1991)	May 1914	The Strand Magazine	June 1916	Pictorial Review	Roland Bleke	62	42
"The Episode of the Theatrical Venture"	A Man of Means (1991)	June 1914	The Strand Magazine	July 1916	Pictorial Review	Roland Bleke	63	44
"The Episode of the Live Weekly"	A Man of Means (1991)	July 1914	The Strand Magazine	August 1916	Pictorial Review	Roland Bleke	64	45
"The Episode of the Exiled Monarch"	A Man of Means (1991)	August 1914	The Strand Magazine	September 1916	Pictorial Review	Roland Bleke	65	47
"The Episode of the Hired Past"	A Man of Means (1991)	September 1914	The Strand Magazine	October 1916	Pictorial Review	Roland Bleke	66	49
"Mr McGee's Big Day"	Plum Stones (1993)	–	–	November 1950	Ellery Queen's Mystery Magazine	–	67	82
"Disentangling Old Percy" ("Disentangling Old Duggie")	Plum Stones (1993)	August 1912	The Strand Magazine	March 1912	Collier's	Reggie Pepper	68	32
"Concealed Art"	Plum Stones (1993)	February 1915	The Strand Magazine	July 1915	Pictorial Review	Reggie Pepper	69	54
"The Colour Line" ("The Golden Flaw")	Plum Stones (1993)	March 1920	The Grand Magazine	April 1920	McClure's	–	70	65
"Back to the Garage" ("Franklin's Favorite Daughter")	Plum Stones (1993)	July 1929	The Strand Magazine	July 1929	Cosmopolitan	–	71	77
"Love Me, Love My Dog" ("The Watch Dog")	Plum Stones (1993)	August 1910	The Strand Magazine	July 1920	Hampton's	Keggs	72	23
"A Job of Work"	Plum Stones (1993)	January 1913	The Strand Magazine	September 1913	Collier's	–	73	38
"Ways to Get a Gal" (rewrite of "Ahead of Schedule")	Plum Stones (1993)	–	–	February 1957	Dream World	–	74	84
"Creatures of Impulse" (rewritten as "The Crime Wave at Blandings")	Plum Stones (1993)	October 1914	The Strand Magazine	October 1914	McClure's	–	75	50
"Joy Bells for Barmy" ("A Wedding Has Been Arranged") (rewritten as "The Right Approach")	Plum Stones (1993)	November 1946	Carnival	October 1947	Cosmopolitan	–	76	80
"Dudley is Back to Normal" (rewritten as "Joy Bells for Barmy")	Plum Stones (1993)	July 1940	The Strand Magazine	–	–	Bobbie Wickham	77	79
"A Prisoner of War"	Plum Stones (1993)	March 1915	The Strand Magazine	February 1916	Illustrated Sunday Magazine	–	78	55
"The Pro" (rewritten as "The Goal-Keeper and the Plutocrat")	Plum Stones (1993)	August 1906	The Strand Magazine	–	–	–	79	11
"Ladies and Gentlemen v. Players"	Wodehouse at the Wicket (1997)	August 1908	The Windsor Magazine	–	–	Joan Romney	80	13
"Between the Innings"	Wodehouse at the Wicket (1997)	July 1905	The Novel Magazine	–	–	–	81	4
"Kid Brady, Light-Weight"	Kid Brady Stories and A Man of Means (2013)	–	–	September 1905	Pearson's (US)	Kid Brady	82	5
"How Kid Brady Broke Training"	Kid Brady Stories and A Man of Means (2013)	–	–	November 1905	Pearson's (US)	Kid Brady	83	6
"How Kid Brady Won the Championship"	Kid Brady Stories and A Man of Means (2013)	–	–	January 1906	Pearson's (US)	Kid Brady	84	7
"How Kid Brady Assisted a Damsel in Distress"	Kid Brady Stories and A Man of Means (2013)	–	–	March 1906	Pearson's (US)	Kid Brady	85	8
"How Kid Brady Joined the Press"	Kid Brady Stories and A Man of Means (2013)	–	–	May 1906	Pearson's (US)	Kid Brady	86	9
"How Kid Brady Fought for His Eyes"	Kid Brady Stories and A Man of Means (2013)	–	–	July 1906	Pearson's (US)	Kid Brady	87	10
"How Kid Brady Took a Sea Voyage"	Kid Brady Stories and A Man of Means (2013)	–	–	March 1907	Pearson's (US)	Kid Brady	88	12
