= Test case =

Test case may refer to:

- Test case (law), a case brought to set a legal precedent
- Test case (software), a set of conditions and variables used to test a software application
- "The Test Case", a 1915 short story by P. G. Wodehouse
- The Test Case (web series), a 2017 Hindi web series
