= The Man with Two Left Feet =

1917 short story collection by P. G. Wodehouse

1922 edition

The Man with Two Left Feet, and Other Stories is a collection of short stories by British author P. G. Wodehouse, first published in the UK on 8 March 1917 by Methuen & Co., London, and in the US on 1 February 1933 by A. L. Burt and Co., New York. All the stories had previously appeared in periodicals, usually The Strand Magazine in the United Kingdom and The Red Book Magazine or The Saturday Evening Post in the United States.

It is a miscellaneous collection and includes several stories that are more serious than Wodehouse's more well-known comic fiction. Wodehouse biographer Richard Usborne stated that the collection was "mostly sentimental apprentice work", though one light-hearted story, "Extricating Young Gussie", is notable for the first appearance in print of two of Wodehouse's best-known characters, Jeeves and his master Bertie Wooster (although Bertie's surname is not given and Jeeves's role is very small), and Bertie's fearsome Aunt Agatha.

In the US version of the book, "Wilton's Holiday", "Crowned Heads", and the two-part "The Mixer" were omitted, and replaced with three Reggie Pepper stories that had appeared in the UK collection My Man Jeeves (1919). These stories were "Absent Treatment", "Rallying Round Old George" (later rewritten as the Mulliner story "George and Alfred"), and "Doing Clarence a Bit of Good" (later rewritten as the Jeeves story "Jeeves Makes an Omelette").

== Contents ==
=== "Bill the Bloodhound" ===
- US: The Century Magazine, February 1915 (as "Bill, the Bloodhound", US setting)
- UK: The Strand Magazine, April 1915 (UK setting, source for this book)

Plot

Henry Pitfield Rice, a young man employed in a detective bureau, falls in love with chorus girl Alice Weston and proposes to her, but she refuses. She is fond of him but wants to marry someone in her profession. Henry tries to get a job on the stage but fails since he cannot sing or dance. Henry is sent by his employer to follow the touring company performing The Girl from Brighton, which Alice is part of, since a woman wants her husband shadowed and he is an actor in the show. Henry follows the company from town to town, using different disguises. Though it bothers Henry not to be able to talk to Alice, he enjoys travel and admires the company's performers, including Sidney Crane, who plays the hero, and the company's star actor, amiable comedian Walter Jelliffe. Henry chats with Jelliffe in multiple towns in different disguises.

Eventually, Jelliffe asks Henry who he is following. The company realized that Henry is a detective and call him Bill the Bloodhound. They are holding a sweepstake on who he is investigating. The show has been successful, so Jelliffe thinks Henry is lucky and asks him to join them as a mascot. Henry agrees, but refuses to reveal who he is following. During the next show, Henry proposes to Alice just before she goes on stage. He tries to follow her and trips onto the stage, delighting the crowd and interrupting a song by Clarice Weaver, who is unpopular in the company. Later, Jelliffe assures Henry that the company is glad about Henry's interruption, because it compelled Clarice Weaver to quit and Sidney Crane's wife will replace her as the show's heroine. Henry will soon have to go back to London (US version: New York), because he was hired by Mrs Crane. Jelliffe, who is glad he won the sweepstake, urges him to join the troupe. Jelliffe is certain that Henry will be a successful actor and mascot for the company because he is lucky. Henry gladly joins the company, and is now in the same profession as Alice.

=== "Extricating Young Gussie" ===
- US: The Saturday Evening Post, 18 September 1915
- UK: The Strand Magazine, January 1916 (source for this book)

See "Extricating Young Gussie".

=== "Wilton's Holiday" ===
- UK: The Strand Magazine, July 1915 (source for this book, UK setting: Marvis Bay)
- US: Illustrated Sunday Magazine and Minneapolis Tribune Sunday Magazine, 19 March 1916 (as "Wilton's Vacation", US setting: Rockport)

Plot

The story is narrated by a man from London (a man from New York in the US edition). Jack Wilton comes to Marois Bay to spend his holiday. There he invents a story about his fiancée, Amy, dying on their wedding day to prevent local people from confiding in him and from bothering him with their sad stories and problems. Then he falls in love with another holiday maker, Mary Campbell, and he proposes to her but is refused by her on the grounds that memories of Amy will always be between them. When he tells her that he invented Amy, she decides to break with him for good.

Upset about Mary, Jack goes for a walk on the seashore and ends up falling asleep against a rock in a secluded cove. When he wakes up, he finds that Mary is there, since she happened to do the same thing. When the tide rises, they are trapped and Mary fears they will drown. She confesses her love for Jack, but he tells her the tide won't get high enough to drown them, and she gets annoyed that he didn't tell her earlier. They sit apart from each other for a while waiting for the tide to recede. Eventually, Mary forgives him and they reconcile.

=== "The Mixer: He Meets a Shy Gentleman" ===
- UK: The Strand Magazine, November 1915 (as "The Mixer", source for this book, UK setting)
- US: The Red Book Magazine, June 1916 (as "A Very Shy Gentleman", US setting)

Plot

The narrator, the Mixer, is a dog with the face of a bulldog and the body of a terrier. He lives in an East End pub with his mother and calls himself a Mixer because is sociable. He is not a pretty dog but does look fierce, so he is bought by a man looking for a guard dog. The restless dog is eager to see life and barks goodbye to his mother and others at the pub, including the friendly barman Fred. The furtive man who bought the dog keeps to himself, so the dog thinks he is shy and calls him the Shy Man. The man is only talkative on one occasion, when he tells an associate that the dog will help him enter unnoticed into a house that always keeps a guard dog. He is stern and hits the narrator when he barks, but rewards him when he learns not to bark. The dog thinks the man is too shy to stand being spoken to. Despite the times the man hit him, the dog grows attached to him and is sorry he is so shy.

Some time later, the Shy Man brings the dog to a vacated country house being looked after by a caretaker. The caretaker's old guard dog died earlier that day because it was poisoned. The Shy Man sells the narrator to the caretaker to be the new guard dog. The dog is pleased to see Fred, who visits the caretaker, his father. That night, the Shy Man breaks into the house, and the dog, trained not to bark, keeps quiet. However, he pities the man's shyness, and wakes Fred up so Fred can see him and help him not be shy. Fred hears the intruder's footsteps and, armed with a gun, has the intruder arrested. The dog is confused about why the Shy Man is taken away, but Fred and his father treat him very well after the incident, so he decides not to worry about it.

=== "The Mixer: He Moves in Society" ===
- UK: The Strand Magazine, December 1915 (as "The Mixer", source for this book, UK setting)
- US: The Red Book Magazine, July 1916 (as "Breaking into Society", US setting)

Plot

The narrator, the sociable dog who calls himself the Mixer, runs across the street and is hit by a car, though the car was going slowly and he is not seriously hurt. The chauffeur, a boy named Peter, and the boy's nurse get out of the car to check on the dog. Peter wants to keep the dog and names him Fido. Fido does not like his new name much but he likes Peter. At Peter's large country house, his parents disapprove of Fido because they keep award-winning pedigree dogs, but they do not deny Peter anything and he gets to keep Fido. The other dogs act snobbish towards Fido. He is relieved to find a friendly terrier named Jack belonging to one of the servants. Jack used to belong to Peter, but Peter tired of him. Jack warns that Peter will tire of Fido, and suggests he do something to please the family so he can stay. Fido gets along well with Peter but worries Jack is right after Peter tires of a toy aeroplane.

Fido sees a rat in the drawing room and tries to help by attacking it. He only realizes it is actually a small toy dog named Toto after Toto barks at him. Fido apologizes, but Toto only barks that he could have beaten Fido. Peter's mother says Fido is dangerous and must be shot. Fido is brought to the stables and resigned to his fate, but then he is secretly rescued by Peter. Peter runs away with Fido into the woods. They walk for a long time and fall asleep. Eventually, a search party comes. Peter tells his father that he was kidnapped by brigands and rescued by Fido. His father says that from now on Fido shall be an honoured guest. Fido does not understand why Peter insists he was kidnapped by brigands, but once again he is treated well and decides not to worry.

=== "Crowned Heads" ===
- US: The Argosy, June 1914
- UK: Pearson's Magazine, April 1915 (source for this book)

Plot

A young but unattractive girl, Katie Bennett, who runs a small secondhand bookshop in New York, meets a young and attractive man, Ted Brady, who is a famous and respected athlete. Ted falls in love with her and proposes to her. Katie wants to marry him and initially accepts. However, her grandfather, Matthew Bennett, lives under the illusion that he is the King of England and objects to their marriage, claiming that Katie cannot marry a commoner. Katie is her grandfather's caretaker and is unwilling to upset him by marrying Ted.

Ted's friend, a boxer, offers to pretend to threaten Mr. Bennett so Ted can defend Mr. Bennett and win his favour. Ted approves of this plan but Katie rejects it, fearing it would be too much for her grandfather's nervous system. She forces herself to tell Ted that they should not see each other again for some time. Ted reluctantly goes and a few months pass. One day, Ted returns and asks to speak to Katie's grandfather. They talk, and Mr. Bennett excitedly calls Katie into the room. Mr. Bennett now approves of Ted marrying Katie, since Ted was elected King of Coney Island for Mardi Gras.

=== "At Geisenheimer's" ===
- US: The Saturday Evening Post, 21 August 1915
- UK: The Strand Magazine, October 1915 (as "The Love-r-ly Silver Cup", source for this book)

Plot

Miss Roxborough (the story's narrator) meets Charlie Ferris at a New York club called Geisenheimer's, where she is employed as a professional dancer. Charlie and his wife Mary are from Maine, and Charlie loves New York though Mary doesn't. Charlie thinks Mary is not a good enough dancer for New York and dances with others while Mary meekly sits to the side. In Maine, Mary knew a man named John Tyson, whose wife left him because she was captivated by New York, and she fears she will similarly lose Charlie to New York. Miss Roxborough feels sorry for Mary and wants to help. The club holds a dancing contest, which is actually arranged so that Miss Roxborough's ticket number will be announced the winner, so that the management do not really have to give away the prize, the Love-r-ly Silver Cup.

Miss Roxborough convinces Mary to enter the contest with a dance partner and gives Mary a ticket. Miss Roxborough dances with Charlie, who is focused on dancing and does not realize Mary is competing until the contest ends. Miss Roxborough's original number is announced the winner, but she gave her ticket to Mary, so Mary and her partner win. Charlie is stunned that Mary won. Miss Roxborough convinces him that Mary may become captivated by New York and leave him if they stay much longer, so he now wants to go back with Mary to Maine. The management is upset about Miss Roxborough giving her ticket to Mary. Miss Roxborough has decided to quit her job anyway and return to Maine, to reunite with her husband John Tyson.

=== "The Making of Mac's" ===
- UK: The Strand Magazine, May 1915 (source for this book, UK setting)
- US: The Red Book Magazine, May 1916 (as 'The Romance of "Mac's"', US setting)

Plot

The first narrator asks Henry Woodward, an experienced waiter at Mac's Restaurant, how the restaurant came to be successful. Henry tells the following story. Mr MacFarland is a widower with a reticent son named Andy. MacFarland also adopts Katie, the amiable daughter of a deceased friend. MacFarland started the restaurant (then called MacFarland's), which got off to a good start thanks to Henry and the skilled French cook Jules. Katie becomes cashier at the restaurant, while secretly taking dancing classes. Andy attends college but quits and takes over the restaurant after Mr MacFarland dies.

At some point, Katie and Andy start dating, but Andy disapproves of her decision to go on the stage and ends things between them. She is successful, and brings friends from the theatre to MacFarland's. This leads to the restaurant becoming popular, though Andy is not grateful and still distant to Katie. The restaurant's employees work hard to maintain the restaurant's quality and popularity. Henry concludes that this is how Mac's became successful, but the original narrator wants to know what happened to Katie and Andy.

Henry is like an uncle to Katie and sympathetic to her, and he is disappointed with Andy for being cold and ungrateful to her. On one occasion she starts dancing at the restaurant but Andy tells her to stop, and she stops coming to the restaurant. One evening, Henry finds a letter under his door from Katie, who has decided to kill herself by filling her room with gas. Henry is shocked and quickly goes to save her. He talks with her and she tells him she broke her ankle and will never be able to dance again. This was too much for her on top of losing Andy. Henry gets her to promise not to kill herself, and then brings her letter to Andy. Andy rushes to her side. Henry leaves them with Andy finally showing his affection and embracing her.

=== "One Touch of Nature" ===
- US: McClure's Magazine, August 1914 (as "Brother Fans")

Plot

A businessman from New York, J. Wilmot Birdsey, moved to England five years ago because his wife wanted them to be near their daughter Mae, who married an English earl. Mr Birdsey is a great fan of baseball games and misses them. He hears that the White Sox and the Giants are going to give an exhibition in London at the Chelsea Football Ground, and eagerly attends the event. He greatly enjoys it, especially because the two men seated next to him who are also passionate fans of the sport. Birdsey thinks of them as "brother-fans" and asks them to dinner to discuss the game. The first man, Mr Waterall, happily agrees. The second, Mr Johnson, is more reluctant, but is persuaded by Birdsey.

At dinner, Waterall, who is from New York, believes that Johnson looks familiar, though Johnson denies knowing Waterall. Johnson used to live in New York, but has lived in Algiers for five years. Waterall mentions that he is the London correspondent of the New York Chronicle. Birdsey explains that his daughter married an earl, and he sneaked out of a big dinner party to attend the baseball game. Johnson says little about himself. Waterall realizes that Johnson is actually Mr. Benyon, who robbed the New Asiatic Bank, jumped his bail, and fled five years ago. Waterall reported on his trial. Benyon admits he risked recognition to see the baseball game because he missed baseball and New York.

Waterall telephones Scotland Yard to report Benyon's whereabouts, but Birdsey is moved by Benyon's love of baseball. He tackles Waterall so Benyon can escape. Waterall is furious with Birdsey and does not know what he will tell the police when they arrive. Birdsey assures Waterall he can come up with a story for the police, but Birdsey faces a more difficult job: explaining his absence from the dinner party to his wife.

The exhibition game in London between the White Sox and the Giants that all three main characters attend was not an invention of Wodehouse—the game really happened on February 26, 1914. The "Mr. Daly" who hit a home run was White Sox catcher Tom Daly, who ended the game in the 11th inning with a walk-off homer.

=== "Black for Luck" ===
- UK: The Strand Magazine, June 1915
- US: The Red Book Magazine, July 1915 (as "A Black Cat for Luck", main source for this book)

Plot

A writer, Elizabeth Herrold, takes in a stray black cat. The janitor of her apartment building remarks that black cats bring good luck. Elizabeth hopes so, since she is having trouble selling stories to magazines. She names the cat Joseph and values his company, especially because she has no friends. One day Joseph goes into the nearby flat belonging to James Renshaw Boyd. Elizabeth asks for her cat back. James pretends the cat is his, but she questions him further and he admits the cat is hers. He is superstitious and believes if he gives up the cat, the upcoming play he wrote, his first play, will fail. Elizabeth appreciates this and allows him to keep the cat. When she says she has no friends, James says she should take Joseph back, but Elizabeth insists James keep Joseph.

Elizabeth grows close to James. She tells him about how a rich and unexpected aunt sent her to college, though James is reluctant to discuss his past. Elizabeth gets a job as an advice columnist. James is drained by difficult rehearsals, and in despair, he suddenly embraces Elizabeth. This shocks and upsets Elizabeth. She quickly returns to her own flat, and ignores the doorbell ringing. Two weeks later, the play opens, and receives very negative criticism. Elizabeth forgets her resentment. She loves James and is concerned for him. He is initially crushed, but Elizabeth comforts him. They agree to get married. Though James wanted to try being a playwright, his father is the rich owner of a pork company and James has a job waiting in Chicago. Elizabeth says she will go to Chicago with him. The cat goes into the flat of Paul Axworthy Briggs, and James advises Briggs to hold onto the cat, who brings luck in unexpected ways.

The Strand version is significantly different. There is no mention of Elizabeth being a writer, and she has no friends in New York because she is from Canada. James apologizes to Elizabeth shortly after suddenly embracing her, and she realizes she loves him then.

=== "The Romance of an Ugly Policeman" ===
- UK: The Strand Magazine, January 1915 (main source for this book)
- US: Ainslee's Magazine, April 1915, reprinted September 1926

Plot

Constable Edward Plimmer patrols his beat, Battersea Park Road. The road is too peaceful and gives him little opportunity to earn a promotion. However, he likes the road more when he falls in love with a girl who lives there, Ellen Brown. However, she is dating the handsome milkman, Alf Brooks. Plimmer, a big, red-faced man with a broken nose, is jealous of Brooks. Plimmer argues with Ellen when he sees her posting a letter to Brooks. In a sporting spirit, she retorts that he is jealous. She is stunned when Plimmer admits that he is. He looks her in the eyes and then leaves, restraining his emotions.

Later, an elderly woman calls for Constable Plimmer. The woman, named Jane, tells Plimmer that her cook has stolen a brooch and some money. Jane's husband Henry admits he took the money since his wife controls his spending, but the cook, who turns out to be Ellen, admits to taking the brooch. She only wished to borrow it. Jane does not believe her, and Plimmer reluctantly escorts Ellen to the police station. While walking, they see Alf, who is waiting for Ellen. Since she is being arrested, Alf pretends not to recognize her.

This devastates Ellen. Plimmer, seeing the look on her face, tells her to run after Alf and tell him it was all a joke. Plimmer will let her go, even if he is dismissed or sent to prison as a result. Ellen refuses to go to Alf after the way he ignored her, but is touched that Plimmer would have let her go and asks him why. He replies that he does not think she stole anything, and admits he loves her. Though Plimmer again tells her to go, she does not want him to get in trouble and insists that he take her to the station. Ellen expects to be in prison for thirty days. She tells Plimmer that she hopes he will be there waiting for her when she comes out, and he assures her he will be there if he has to sit up all night.

The Ainslee's version of the story is significantly different. Some money is stolen but there is no mention of a brooch. Plimmer still says he will be there for Ellen when she comes out of prison, but Ellen is shown at the end to be innocent and does not go to prison. Plimmer asks her to marry him.

=== "A Sea of Troubles" ===
- US: McClure's Magazine, September 1914 (US setting)
- UK: Pearson's Magazine, June 1915 (source for this book, UK setting)

The story is titled "A Sea of Trouble" in the US edition of The Man with Two Left Feet.

Plot

Mr Meggs is fifty-six and rich. He was once a clerk in a shipping firm, but twenty years ago he received a large inheritance and retired to his native village. He has lived an idle, sedentary life and has indulged in rich food. One day he finds that he has chronic pains from indigestion. Patent medicines fail to help. The pain is bad enough that Meggs eventually decides to end his own life, but first, he plans to send money to his heirs. Though he would deny it, he enjoys choosing his heirs and writing them letters. Meggs is resolved not to leave a will and to send all his money directly to the beneficiaries. He prepares envelopes to send to six friends he worked with as a clerk. Each envelope contains a letter and money.

He summons his secretary, Miss Jane Pillenger, an austere older woman who has worked for Meggs for six years. He has set aside a legacy of five hundred pounds for her. Meggs gives her the six letters to post, and then hands her the five hundred pounds. He tries to explain that he holds her in high regard and kisses her on the forehead. Pillenger thinks he is flirting with her and hits him. He tries to explain the misunderstanding, but she does not believe him. She resigns from her post and leaves the room. Meggs, indignant, feels people are ungrateful and that it would be absurd to kill himself and leave them money. Now determined not to commit suicide, he realizes Pillenger left with the six envelopes. He runs after her telling her to stop but she thinks he is dangerous and flees shouting for help. Several men come and grab Meggs. A policeman questions him. Meggs, who is winded from running, manages to explain that he only wanted the letters. The constable lets him go. Pillenger haughtily gives him the letters and departs. The next morning, Meggs feels unusually well. He realizes the exercise of running helped him, and plans to seek a fitness trainer in London.

=== "The Man with Two Left Feet" ===
- US: The Saturday Evening Post, 18 March 1916
- UK: The Strand Magazine, May 1916 (source for this book)

Plot

Henry Wallace Mills is a bank teller in New York. Henry spends his vacation at Ye Bonnie Briar-Bush Farm, where he meets Minnie Mill. She looks tired, and explains she has been dancing in the city. Henry is not a dancer and prefers to spend his free time reading the Encyclopaedia Britannica, but he is able to impress Minnie with his knowledge. They fall in love and get married. Their first year together is very happy, with Minnie often listening to him reading the Encyclopaedia aloud.

The anniversary of their wedding comes, and they have supper at Geisenheimer's. Henry notices his former colleague Sidney Mercer there. Sidney is now a professional dancer at Geisenheimer's. Sidney notices Henry and Minnie aren't dancing. Henry admits he doesn't dance, and encourages Minnie to dance with Sidney. Henry thinks Minnie must find life with him dull, and resolves to learn to dance. He keeps this secret from her in order to surprise her on her birthday. He takes private dancing lessons, instructed by Madame Gavarni and her niece. Minnie seems to grow distant. Henry thinks she is bored, and looks forward to surprising her with dancing.

On Minnie's birthday, he brings her to Geisenheimer's. Sidney asks Minnie to dance, but Henry declares he will dance with her. They dance, and Henry, unused to dancing in a crowd, ends up hitting other dancers and embarrassing himself. Henry and Minnie return to their flat, and he apologizes to her. He explains that he took dancing lessons secretly to make things less dull for her. She is thrilled to hear this, because she had seen Henry with Madame Gavarni's niece and had misunderstood. She assures Henry she does not find their life dull. In fact, she was tired when she met Henry because she was a dancing instructor and hated it. She truly enjoys listening to him read, and asks him to read her something out of the Encyclopaedia, which he gladly does.

== Publication history ==
In the Strand (UK), Alfred Leete illustrated "Bill the Bloodhound", "The Making of Mac's", "Black for Luck", and "The Romance of an Ugly Policeman". Lewis Baumer illustrated Wilton's Holiday" and "The Man with Two Left Feet". Both parts of "The Mixer" were illustrated by J. A. Shepard in the Strand. "The Love-r-ly Silver Cup" was illustrated by Treyer Evans. In Pearson's, "Crowned Heads" was illustrated by Leslie Hunter, and "A Sea of Troubles" was illustrated by "Esmond".

In The Saturday Evening Post (US), Arthur William Brown illustrated "At Geisenheimer's" and "The Man with Two Left Feet". Brown also illustrated "Bill, the Bloodhound" in Century. In Red Book, "A Very Shy Gentleman", "Breaking into Society", and 'The Romance of "Mac's"' were illustrated by Richard Culter. "A Black Cat for Luck" was illustrated by Gayle Porter Hoskins. In McClure's, "One Touch of Nature" was illustrated by Lucius Wolcott Hitchcock, and "A Sea of Troubles" was illustrated by Alexander Popini. "Wilton's Vacation" was illustrated by Frank Godwin in the Illustrated Sunday Magazine.

"A Sea of Troubles" was included in the collection P. G. Wodehouse (Methuen's Library of Humour), published in 1934 by Methuen, London, and edited by E. V. Knox. "Bill the Bloodhound" was included in the anthology The Faber Book of Stories, published by Faber and Faber, London, in 1960 and edited by Kathleen Lines. An excerpt of "The Romance of an Ugly Policeman" was included in the 1982 anthology A Way with Words: Favorite Pieces Chosen by Famous People, edited by Christina Shewell and Virginia Dean, and published by Sinclair Browne, London; it was chosen by Robert Bolt. "The Mixer" was included in the 1985 US collection A Wodehouse Bestiary, edited by D. R. Bensen.

Under the title "Very Shy Gentleman", the first part of "The Mixer" was included in the 1926 US anthology Real Dogs, An Anthology of Short Stories, published by Holt and edited by Charles Wright Gray, and in the 1955 US anthology Great Dog Stories, published by Ballantine Books. "The Mixer—I and II" was included in the anthology Stories by Modern Masters, published by Methuen, London, in 1936 and edited by Peter Wait. "The Mixer" was also included in the anthology Stories for Boys, published by Faber, London, in 1957, and in the anthology Stories for Tens & Over, edited by Sara and Stephen Corrin and published by Faber and Faber, London, in 1976.

== Adaptations ==
Maplewood Barn Radio (Missouri, US) has adapted some early Wodehouse stories for radio, including the two-part story "The Mixer" in 2015, as well as two other stories collected in The Man with Two Left Feet, "At Geisenheimer's" and "Extricating Young Gussie".

== See also ==
- List of short stories by P. G. Wodehouse
