= Jeeves Makes an Omelette =

- Short story by P. G. Wodehouse
- Illustrator: James Simpkins
- Country: United Kingdom
- Language: English
- Genre: Comedy

Publication
- Publisher: Star Weekly
- Media type: Print (Magazine)
- Publication date: May 1913 (Reggie Pepper version); August 1958 (Jeeves version)
- Series: Reggie Pepper (1913 version); Jeeves (1958 version)

"Jeeves Makes an Omelette" is a short story by P. G. Wodehouse, and features the young gentleman Bertie Wooster and his valet Jeeves. The story was published in the Star Weekly in Canada in August 1958. The story was also included in the 1959 collection A Few Quick Ones.

This Jeeves story is a rewritten version of the Reggie Pepper story, "Doing Clarence a Bit of Good". The Reggie Pepper version was published in the UK in The Strand Magazine in May 1913, and in the US in Pictorial Review in April 1914 under the title "Rallying Round Clarence".

In the story "Jeeves Makes an Omelette", Bertie is tasked by his Aunt Dahlia with stealing and destroying a painting.

== Plot ==
Bertie gets a call from his Aunt Dahlia. She is at Marsham Manor, where she is trying to convince the romance novelist Cornelia Fothergill into selling her new novel to Aunt Dahlia's weekly paper, Milady's Boudoir, as a serial. Aunt Dahlia asks Bertie to come help charm Cornelia into lower price, and also do another job. Bertie agrees, not wishing to be barred from the cooking of Aunt Dahlia's superb chef Anatole. With Jeeves, Bertie arrives and meets Cornelia, her husband Everard, and his father Edward. Aunt Dahlia explains to Bertie that Edward, an amateur artist, painted Venus and gave the painting for Everard as a wedding present, but Everard, a professional artist, cannot stand the painting.

Aunt Dahlia shows Bertie one of Everard's paintings, which she claims is better, though Bertie does not see much difference. Cornelia has agreed to lower her price if Edward's painting is removed. Aunt Dahlia wants Bertie to steal and destroy the painting, leaving the window open so that thieves will be blamed. Bertie consults Jeeves, who advises using treacle and brown paper to silently break the window instead. At night, Jeeves breaks the window, and Bertie cuts out the painting with a knife. Bertie brings it to his room.

With the three of us sparing no effort, we soon completed the work in hand. I had scarcely got through my first whisky and s. and was beginning on another, when all that was left of the Venus, not counting the ashes, was the little bit at the south-east end which Jeeves was holding. He was regarding it with what seemed to me a rather thoughtful eye.

— Jeeves notices the painting's signature

Following Jeeves's advice, Bertie starts cutting the large painting up and burning it piece by piece. Aunt Dahlia comes to help. All three cut up and burn the painting; Bertie using the knife, Aunt Dahlia scissors, and Jeeves garden shears. When they are nearly finished, Jeeves notices one of the pieces bears the signature "Everard Fothergill".

Bertie thinks the signature says "Edward" but Aunt Dahlia agrees it is "Everard". Bertie goes to check if he got the wrong painting, and bumps into Edward, who regrets giving Everard his painting and is stealing it back. Now Edward's painting is gone, but they have destroyed Everard's painting, which will upset Cornelia. Jeeves suggests that Bertie should be found lying stunned, so that it appears he tried to fend off thieves. Aunt Dahlia proposes hitting Bertie on the head with something, and Jeeves suggests the gong stick. Bertie disapproves and moves to leave, but is knocked out when he turns away. Bertie wakes up in bed with a headache, and is annoyed. Aunt Dahlia tells him that Cornelia was grateful for Bertie's bravery and sold her the serial at a low price. Aunt Dahlia sympathizes with Bertie, but, quoting what Jeeves said after Bertie was knocked out, says that you can't make an omelette without breaking eggs. Bertie tells Jeeves to cut out eggs and lay off omelettes from now on, and Jeeves agrees, adding that he will bear it in mind.

== Differences between editions ==
In the 1913 version of the story featuring Reggie Pepper, Reggie's ex-fiancée Elizabeth Shoolbred, now married to a professional artist name Clarence Yeardsley, tells Reggie to steal and destroy the painting of Venus made by Clarence's father, an amateur painter named Matthew Yeardsley. Reggie is briefly knocked out by his friend and Elizabeth's brother, Bill Yeardsley, who mistakes Reggie for a burglar. With Bill's help, Reggie destroys a painting, but he accidentally chooses Clarence's painting. Ultimately, Matthew Yeardsley steals his own painting anyway, and Reggie and Bill flee to London to avoid Elizabeth and Clarence since they destroyed Clarence's painting.

In the American edition of the Reggie Pepper story, Reggie lives in New York rather than London.

== Style ==
Wodehouse's stories make frequent references to the Sherlock Holmes stories, and Bertie often introduces a story with language imitating that of Dr. Watson. For example, in the beginning of this story, Bertie says that if anyone should ever start a society for keeping aunts in check and ask him to join, he would do so instantly, "And my mind would flit to the sinister episode of my Aunt Dahlia and the Fothergill Venus".

== Publication history ==
"Doing Clarence a Bit of Good" was illustrated by Charles Crombie in the Strand. "Rallying Round Clarence" was illustrated by James Montgomery Flagg in Pictorial Review. "Jeeves Makes an Omelette" appeared with illustrations by James Simpkins in the Star Weekly. In February 1959, this story was published in the British magazine Lilliput, illustrated by John Cooper. In August 1959, the story was printed in the American magazine Ellery Queen's Mystery Magazine, under the title "Jeeves and the Stolen Venus". It was published in Argosy (UK) in July 1972. The Jeeves story was included in P. G. Wodehouse Short Stories, a 1983 collection of Wodehouse stories illustrated by George Adamson and published by The Folio Society.

The Reggie Pepper story "Doing Clarence a Bit of Good" was included in the 1919 UK collection My Man Jeeves, and the American version, "Rallying Round Clarence", was included in the American edition of the collection The Man with Two Left Feet, published in 1933. The British version of the story was included, under the story's American title, in Enter Jeeves by Dover Publications, a 1997 collection featuring all the Reggie Pepper stories and several early Jeeves stories.

Wodehouse used some plot elements of the Reggie Pepper story in the 1921 story "The Wigmore Venus", one of the stories collected in Indiscretions of Archie.

The Jeeves version of the story was written well after 1931, so it was not included in the first edition of the Jeeves Omnibus, a 1931 collection of all the Jeeves short stories from the three earlier collections The Inimitable Jeeves, Carry On, Jeeves and Very Good, Jeeves. "Jeeves Makes an Omelette" was later included, along with "Jeeves and the Greasy Bird", in the second edition of the omnibus, which was titled The World of Jeeves and published in 1967.

== Adaptations ==
The Jeeves story was adapted into part of the Jeeves and Wooster episode "Aunt Dahlia, Cornelia and Madeline", the sixth episode of the third series, which first aired in the UK on 3 May 1992. There are some differences in plot, including:

- In the episode, Everard is painting Roderick Spode, to celebrate his recent elevation to Earl of Sidcup. It is Spode, not Edward, who steals Edward's painting, because the model for the painting was his mother. While Jeeves and Aunt Dahlia do come up with the plan to have Bertie found stunned, it is Spode who knocks out Bertie. It is also Spode who smashes the glass.
- Unlike in the original story, in the episode it is not mentioned that there have recently been heists in the area by a local group of thieves.
- In the episode, it is Bertie who uses the treacle and brown paper; he does not succeed in using it. Edward also enters the room while Bertie is in the middle of his heist, and Edward, startled, faints.
- In the episode, only Aunt Dahlia cuts up the painting, though Bertie holds it for her.
- In the episode, Edward hates his painting and has Jeeves burn it.
