= A Man of Means =

1991 short story collection by P. G. Wodehouse and C.H. Bovill

- First edition
- Author: P. G. Wodehouse; C. H. Bovill
- Language: English
- Published: 1991
- Publisher: Porpoise Books
- Publication date: 1914
- Publication place: United Kingdom

A Man of Means is a collection of six short stories written in collaboration by P. G. Wodehouse and C. H. Bovill. The stories first appeared in the United Kingdom in The Strand Magazine in 1914, and in the United States in Pictorial Review in 1916. They were later published in book form in the UK by Porpoise Books in 1991. The collection was released on Project Gutenberg in 2003.

The stories all star Roland Bleke, a young man for whom financial success is always a mixed blessing. The plots follow on from each other, sometimes directly, and occasionally refer back to past events in Bleke's meteoric career.

== Contents ==
=== "The Episode of the Landlady's Daughter" ===
- UK: Strand, April 1914 (as "A Man of Means No. I: Landlady's Daughter")
- US: Pictorial Review, May 1916 (as "A Man of Means: The Episode of the Landlady's Daughter")

Plot

Roland Bleke, an ordinary young man, is a clerk in a seed-merchant’s office in the town of Bury St. Edwards. Roland inadvertently got engaged to his landlady's daughter, Muriel Coppin, and does not want to marry her. He is supposed to marry her when his salary is large enough, so he asks his boss Mr. Fineberg to reduce his salary, which surprises Mr. Fineberg. Roland is disliked by Albert Potter, a strong and silent mechanic who loves Muriel.

Roland tells Muriel's family that his salary was reduced, which disappoints her parents and also her two lazy brothers, who hope to live off Roland's money. Roland learns that he won five hundred pounds in a sweepstake and will receive the cheque shortly. He keeps this secret. However, a week later, a newspaper article announces that Roland won 40,000 pounds. The Coppins all expect Roland to buy them gifts and make it difficult for him to leave.

Muriel insists Roland buy him a car, and with her brothers and Albert, they go to the nearby town of Lexingham to see French pilot Etienne Feriaud perform loops with his aeroplane. Feriaud offers to take a passenger for five pounds, but the spectators are worried it is too dangerous. Albert says that he would do it if he had five pounds, impressing Muriel. Roland offers Albert five pounds, but Albert refuses and tells Roland to do it. Roland agrees and gets into the plane with Feriaud. To the group's surprise, the plane simply flies away.

=== "The Episode of the Financial Napoleon" ===
- UK: Strand, May 1914 (as "A Man of Means No. II: The Bolt From the Blue")
- US: Pictorial Review, June 1916 (as "A Man of Means: The Episode of the Financial Napoleon")

Plot

The aeroplane which flew Roland Bleke to freedom at the end of "The Episode of the Landlady's Daughter" lands in the garden of the Sussex home of one Geoffrey Windlebird, financier of somewhat dubious standing. A perpetual juggler of near-bankrupt companies, Windelbird is on the edge of bankruptcy and scandal as a mining claim he has heavily oversold is about to be exposed. Bleke knows him by reputation, and he, having been shown Bleke's picture in the newspaper by his wife, knows of Bleke's recent windfall.

Bleke, sick after his cold flight, is taken in by the Windlebirds. Worried that his fiancee may object to his disappearance, he arranges with Windelbird to have her paid off, a deal on which Windelbird takes a handsome profit. Windelbird then talks Bleke into investing much of his fortune in his Wild-Cat Reef mining venture, selling him shares he says are owned by a friend.

Next day, Bleke finds Mrs Windlebird in a state of anxiety. The Wild-Cat Reef, she says, has dropped sharply in value, and her husband feels terrible for having persuaded Bleke to throw away his money. She will, she offers, buy back his shares with her small savings, that he may not be left totally penniless. Bleke, touched by her kindness, generously refuses the offer.

The newspapers arrive, and Bleke sees that Wild-Cat has become a huge success, being compared to Klondike. His shares have quadrupled in value overnight; he feels sorry, he says, for Mr Windelbird's friend, who had so recently sold his stock...

=== "The Episode of the Theatrical Venture" ===
- UK: Strand, June 1914 (as "a Man of Means No. III: The Episode of the Theatrical Venture")
- US: Pictorial Review, July 1916 (as "A Man of Means: The Episode of the Theatrical Venture")

Plot

Roland Bleke, a very wealthy man after the events of "The Episode of the Financial Napoleon", finds himself wowed by Miss Billy Verepoint, an attractive and domineering actress. He soon ends up the owner of a notoriously unsuccessful theatre, the Windsor, bought from its unscrupulous former owner, who found his insurance agent's attitude to keeping the place safe from fire a little too strict for his liking.

As her friends start working on a revue to be performed at the theatre and starring Miss Verepoint, Bleke proposes to her, mostly out of fear, and is accepted pending her making a success of her theatrical career. At rehearsals, Bleke is horrified by Miss Verepoint's behaviour and, in dread of having to spend his life married to her, goes away to Norfolk for a quiet week's rest.

Returning to London, he finds the theatre has been burnt to the ground – suffragettes having left their literature around the place. Miss Verepoint and her writer friends demand he rebuild it, but he demurs, explaining that he had not insured the building and was penniless. The theatrical types all leave in disgust, Miss Verepoint calling off the engagement on her way out. Bleke opens his desk and fondly caresses the insurance policies passed on to him by the theatre's previous owner...

=== "The Episode of the Live Weekly" ===
- UK: Strand, July 1914 (as "a Man of Means No. IV: The Episode of the Live Weekly")
- US: Pictorial Review, August 1916 (as "A Man of Means: The Episode of the Live Weekly")

Plot

Roland Bleke, his wealth further increased following the outcome of "The Episode of the Theatrical Venture", sees a pretty young girl crying in the park. Trying to comfort her, he learns she has lost her job as editor of the Woman's Page of Squibs magazine. His chivalry stirred, Bleke tells her he plans to buy the paper.

Visiting the offices, he meets the vibrant young chief editor, and learns the condition of the paper - financially crippled following a competition run by early staff, the prize for which was £5 a week for life. The winner of the prize continues to drain the income of the paper, bringing it to the verge of ruin. Bleke buys it anyway, restoring the girl to her position, but he soon finds his attraction to her drained by her clear affection for her boss.

Frustrated by yet another problematic venture, Bleke repairs to Paris for a month. Returning to London, he finds the place overrun with bizarre advertising stunts for the paper. Confronting the editor, he finds the sales are up, thanks to the campaigns and a new scandal page, which shocks Bleke. The editor explains the stories are all fake, except for one, about a notorious bookie named Percy Pook, who he assures Bleke will never sue.

Next day Bleke finds the editor has been hospitalised following a severe beating, presumably at the hands of the bookie's representatives - he has told the girl to continue his work and to "slip it to" Pook some more. While she prepares the rest of the paper, Bleke volunteers to write the scandal page, to prevent any further insult being meted out. He finds writing difficult, but on seeing a piece about Mr Windelbird, who he had encountered in "The Episode of the Financial Napoleon" and who he assumes is above suspicion, he is inspired to write a provocative piece on the financier's morals.

A week later he is approached with an offer to buy the paper. Happy to be rid of it, he nevertheless names a high price, which he is surprised to find accepted without quibble. He learns that the buyer is none other than his old friend, Mr Geoffrey Windelbird.

=== "The Episode of the Exiled Monarch" ===
- UK: Strand, August 1914 (as "A Man of Means No. V: The Episode of the Exiled Monarch")
- US: Pictorial Review, September 1916 (as "A Man of Means: The Diverting Episode of the Exiled Monarch")

Plot

A new dance craze, the caoutchouc, has hit town, and Roland Bleke quickly falls for the potent charms of its principal proponent, Maraquita. Finally meeting her, however, he soon realises that he has bitten off more than he can chew. She drags him to her house, which he finds filled with the former aristocracy of Paranoya, a small country reeling from a recent revolution. Bleke discovers that he is expected to fund the liberation of the country from it oppressors.

Plans for a bloody counter-revolution commence, and Bleke finds himself threatened by advocates of the new regime. Maraquita suggests they scupper the enemy by writing a will leaving all Bleke's money to her cause. Bleke finds himself beset with mysterious messages bearing only the word "Beware". Soon, he is brought before the exiled King himself, who reveals that he has no desire to be restored to power and is much happier in exile in England.

Baffled at how to talk his new friends out of their plans, he avoids them for a few days; when he finally visits once more, he finds the mood very different. Bombito, Maraquita's largest and most threatening co-conspirator, takes him aside and reveals all. There has been a political change in Paranoya, and Bombito himself has been made president, negating the need for a revolution. Maraquita, Bombito's wife, will be returning home with him forthwith. A relieved Bleke shakes the man's hand.

=== "The Episode of the Hired Past" ===
- UK: Strand, September 1914 (as "A Man of Means No. VI: The Episode of the Hired Past")
- US: Pictorial Review, October 1916 (as "A Man of Means: The Episode of the Hired Past")

Plot

Roland Bleke is once again engaged to be married, this time to Lady Eva Blyton, daughter of an Earl. Feeling utterly out of place in such exalted company, he cannot think of a way to break off the engagement honourably, until Teal, her father's butler, overhearing Bleke's despair, offers a suggestion.

Bleke pays £100 for the butler's niece Maud, a plebeian barmaid, to pose as a jilted former lover; he writes some compromising letters to the girl, and she appears at the house, creating a scene and satisfactorily, though painfully, bringing an end to Bleke's engagement.

Later, Bleke is in a happy reverie as he opens his post; one of the letters is from a solicitor, saying that Maud has several letters in her possession, as well as witnesses in the shape of Miss Blyton's family, proving that he had promised to marry her. To avoid the scandal of a breach-of-promise case, she will accept £10,000.

== Publication history ==
In The Strand Magazine (UK), the stories were attributed to "C. H. Bovill and P. G. Wodehouse", and were illustrated by Alfred Leete. In Pictorial Review (US), the stories were attributed to "Pelham Grenville Wodehouse and C. H. Bovill", and were illustrated by John R. Neill.

== See also ==
- List of short stories by P. G. Wodehouse
