= George and Alfred =

- Short story by P. G. Wodehouse
- Country: United Kingdom
- Language: English
- Genre: Comedy

Publication
- Publisher: The Strand Magazine
- Media type: Print (Magazine)
- Publication date: December 1912 (Reggie Pepper version); September 1966 (Mr. Mulliner version)
- Series: Reggie Pepper (1912 version); Mr. Mulliner (1966 version)

"George and Alfred" is a short story by P. G. Wodehouse and a Mr. Mulliner story. It was published in Playboy magazine in the US in January 1967. The story was also included in the 1966 collection Plum Pie.

An earlier version of the story featured Reggie Pepper and was published as "Rallying Round Old George" in The Strand Magazine in December 1912. An American edition of this story was published in Collier's Weekly on 27 September 1913, titled "Brother Alfred".

In "George and Alfred", Mr. Mulliner goes to Monte Carlo, along with his nephew George, who gets into trouble after getting drunk. To help George, Mr. Mulliner comes up with an idea that takes advantage of the fact that George has a twin brother, Alfred.

== Plot ==
At The Angler's Rest pub, the topic of twins arises, and Mr. Mulliner recounts the following story involving his nephews, the identical twins George and Alfred. Alfred is a magician in London professionally known as "The Great Alfredo", while George is a low-ranking scriptwriter in Hollywood, being essentially a yes-man to his boss Jacob Schnellenhamer. Mr. Mulliner befriends Schnellenhamer and sees George on Schnellenhamer's yacht heading to Monte Carlo. George is eager to collect an inheritance left to him by his godmother from his trustee, P. P. Bassinger, in Monaco.

At Monte Carlo, Mr. Mulliner is surprised to see Alfred, who is performing at the Casino. Mr. Mulliner tells Alfred that he is with the filmmaker Schnellenhamer. Alfred leaves for rehearsal before Mr. Mulliner can tell him that George has also come. Later, Schnellenhamer says that Sam Glutz, whom Schnellenhamer came to Monte Carlo to do business with, was mugged and knocked out near the Casino. He was found by a passer-by and taken to a hospital. Sergeant Brichoux of the Monaco police arrives, looking for George Mulliner. George's wallet was found near where Glutz was mugged. Concerned, Mr. Mulliner looks for George.

"No fortune, a headache, and to top it all off the guillotine or whatever they have in these parts. That's Life, I repeat. Just a bowl of cherries. You can't win."
Twin! I uttered a cry, electrified.

— George gives Mr. Mulliner an idea

He finds George, who had been drinking because Bassinger gambled George's inheritance away and ran off to South America. George remarks that he dreamed he had brawled with someone. Mr. Mulliner concludes that George must have mugged Sam Glutz when drunk. He tells George to flee, but George's passport is on the yacht. George cannot get it while the police are around, and he says his uncle would never find it. George resigns himself to his fate, saying of life, "You can't win". Mr. Mulliner, hearing "twin", gets an idea: George will retrieve his passport pretending to be Alfred.

On the yacht, a man claiming to be Alfred shows up and pitches an idea to Schnellenhamer to include a magician in his next film. Mr. Mulliner realizes this is actually Alfred. Alfred goes further into the yacht to get materials to demonstrate his tricks, and then George appears, pretending to be Alfred. Sergeant Brichoux is about to arrest George when a bandaged man, Sam Glutz, approaches. Schnellenhamer tells him that they have the mugger, George, and that he has fired George. However, Sam reveals that George actually saved his life by fending off the mugger. Sam hires George and promises him a large salary. Sam, George and Mr. Mulliner leave to have lunch. Meanwhile, Alfred returns to demonstrate his tricks to Schnellenhamer.

== Differences between editions ==
There are many differences between the Mr. Mulliner and Reggie Pepper versions of the story. In the Reggie Pepper story, Reggie's friend George Lattaker kisses the maid Emma Pilbeam out of sheer joy when he gets engaged to Stella Vanderley, but Stella sees this and ends their engagement. (Voules, Reggie's valet, also ended his engagement to Emma after seeing George kiss her.) This induces George to drink, and he vaguely remembers getting into a brawl. Also, George is due to receive a legacy from his trustee, his uncle Augustus Arbutt, but is told that he must wait because a man is claiming to be George's long-lost twin brother Alfred.

The Prince of Saxburg-Liegnitz gets mugged near the Casino, and George is suspected. Reggie suggests that George pretend to be Alfred to avoid arrest. George discovers later that the uncle invented the twin brother to buy time to flee after gambling away George's money. Voules finds out about George pretending to be Alfred, and Reggie bribes him to remain silent. Count Fritz von Cöslin, the Prince's equerry, reveals that George saved the Prince's life. Voules suddenly appears, now wealthy and outspoken after a winning streak at the casino; seeking revenge on George for kissing Emma, he betrays George's identity, and is surprised when the Count wants to reward George. Voules reconciles with Emma. Reggie fires him, but Voules was planning to quit anyway.

The plots of the British and American editions of the Reggie Pepper story are essentially the same, though in the latter edition, Reggie Pepper and his friends are American rather than British. Reggie's valet Voules is still English; Reggie introduces him as "an Englishman who had spent most of his time valeting earls, and looked it".

== Background ==
The references to Hollywood in the Mulliner story "George and Alfred" were inspired by Wodehouse's experience as a scriptwriter in Hollywood in the 1930s.

== Publication history ==
The Reggie Pepper story "Rallying Round Old George", published in 1912 in the Strand, credited both Wodehouse and Herbert Westbrook (who would collaborate with Wodehouse on the stage adaptation of the story) as authors. This story was illustrated by Charles Crombie. The American edition titled "Brother Alfred", which only credited Wodehouse as the author, was illustrated by Wallace Morgan in Collier's. The Mulliner story "George and Alfred" was illustrated by Bill Charmatz in Playboy.

"Rallying Round Old George" was collected in the American edition of The Man with Two Left Feet in 1917, and in the UK collection My Man Jeeves in 1919. "George and Alfred" was featured in the 1972 collection The World of Mr. Mulliner, and in the 1985 collection of Hollywood-related Wodehouse stories, The Hollywood Omnibus.

The British edition of the Reggie Pepper story was featured, under the American edition title "Brother Alfred", in the collection Enter Jeeves, published in 1997 by Dover Publications. This collection includes all the Reggie Pepper stories and several early Jeeves stories.

== Adaptations ==
The Reggie Pepper version of the story was adapted into a play titled Brother Alfred, co-written by Wodehouse and Herbert Westbrook. The play, produced by and starring Lawrence Grossmith, was performed in April 1913 at the Savoy Theatre in London. The 1932 comedy film Brother Alfred was based on the play.
