= Reggie Pepper =

Fictional character in P. G. Wodehouse stories

- Reggie Pepper (right) in "Concealed Art", illustrated by Alfred Leete (The Strand Magazine, 1915)
- First appearance: "Absent Treatment" (1911)
- Last appearance: "The Test Case" (1915)
- Created by: P. G. Wodehouse
- Portrayed by: Lawrence Grossmith

In-universe information
- Full name: Reginald Pepper
- Nickname: Reggie
- Gender: Male
- Relatives: Edward Pepper (uncle; deceased)
- Nationality: British

Reginald "Reggie" Pepper is a fictional character who appears in seven short stories by English author P. G. Wodehouse. Reggie is a young man-about-town who gets drawn into trouble by trying to help his pals. He is considered to be an early prototype for Bertie Wooster, who, along with his valet Jeeves, is one of Wodehouse's most famous creations.

The Reggie Pepper stories were originally published in magazines. Four were included in My Man Jeeves (1919), and the other stories appeared in later miscellaneous collections. The stories were not all collected in one short story collection until they were featured, along with several early Jeeves stories, in the 1997 collection Enter Jeeves.

Two of the four Reggie Pepper stories published in My Man, Jeeves were later rewritten by Wodehouse as Jeeves stories, and one was rewritten as a Mr. Mulliner story.

== Inspiration ==
Reggie Pepper was inspired by the English "dude" roles that Wodehouse saw on the New York stage, and by the stock Edwardian aristocrat parts that Wodehouse had seen played by comedian George Grossmith Jr.

== Life and character ==
Reggie Pepper is a young gentleman who does not do any work, having inherited a great deal of wealth from his uncle Edward Pepper of Pepper, Wells, & Co., the colliery people. He went to Oxford with Freddie Meadowes and Bill Shoolbred. In "Rallying Round Old George", he has a valet named Harold Voules, though he fires Voules by the end of the story. Later, in "Concealed Art", he employs a valet named Wilberforce. Reggie sometimes meets his friends at his club, which is unnamed. (The stories in which he appears were written before Wodehouse had invented the Drones Club). Reggie is not ambitious and is content simply to watch traffic from the window of his club, though he is also curious about the affairs of his friends, as he states in "Concealed Art". Not interested in working himself, he respects others who work.

In the stories, Reggie tries to help his friends with their problems. Despite being considered not very intelligent by his friends, he occasionally experiences a flash of inspiration, which he sometimes refers to as getting a "brain-wave". However, his well-intentioned interference generally backfires somehow. Reggie himself notes this, stating "Doesn't some poet or philosopher fellow say that it’s when our intentions are best that we always make the most poisonous bloomers? I can’t put my hand on the passage, but you’ll find it in Shakespeare or somewhere, I’m pretty certain. Anyhow, it’s always that way with me."

Continually unlucky in love, Reggie states in "Rallying Round Old George" that he has been turned down dozens of times. He was once in love with Elizabeth Shoolbred and was engaged to her for about a week, but she married the artist Clarence Yeardsley instead. He also came close to marrying Ann Selby in "The Test Case". Reggie is not engaged or married at the end of the stories, though he does not seem troubled by this. He is ultimately thankful that he did not marry Elizabeth Yeardsley, who proves to be rather manipulative, or Ann Selby, since she is a strong-minded girl who would have tried to change him.

The American editions of the Reggie Pepper stories differ slightly from the British editions. In the American editions, Reggie Pepper appears to be American and lives in New York instead of London. Another difference is that the money he inherits from his uncle came from a safety razor company rather than a coal company.

== Prototype for Bertie Wooster ==
Reggie Pepper served as a prototype for Wodehouse's later character Bertie Wooster. In a letter to a fan also named Wooster who asked Wodehouse about the origin of Bertie Wooster's name, Wodehouse wrote, "I can't remember how I got the name Wooster. I think it may have been from a serial in the old Captain, where one of the characters was called Worcester. The odd thing is that the Bertie W. character started out as Reggie Pepper, and I don't know why I changed the name."

Notably, it is Bertie's valet Jeeves who would eventually be named "Reggie" like Reggie Pepper, and Bertie Wooster received the middle name "Wilberforce", which is the name of Reggie Pepper's valet.

== The Reggie Pepper stories ==
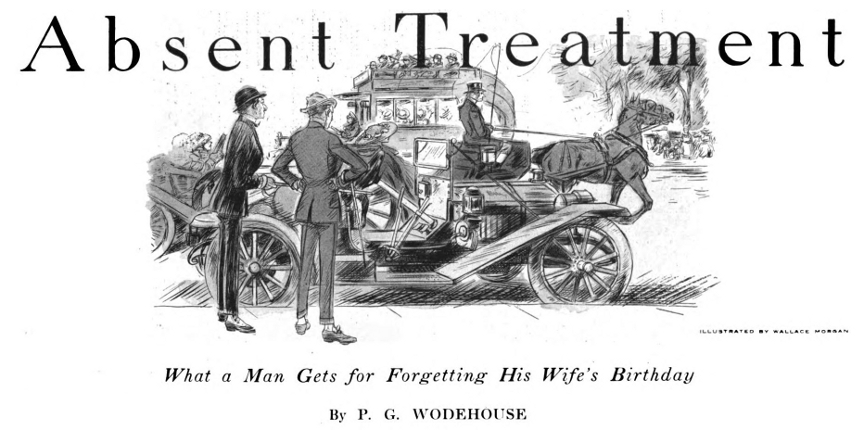
"Absent Treatment" title illustration by Wallace Morgan (Collier's, 1911)

Reggie Pepper appears in the following stories:

=== "Absent Treatment" ===
- UK: Strand Magazine, March 1911
- US: Collier's Weekly, 26 August 1911

Plot

Reggie Pepper's friend Bobbie Cardew, who was very forgetful at the time when the story takes place, invites Reggie to his home for dinner. Reggie sees that Bobbie's wife Mary is very well dressed. Her manner is strained. The following day, Bobbie sullenly tells Reggie that the previous day was his and Mary's first wedding anniversary. Bobbie's forgetfulness continues to create problems between him and Mary, though he does remember to give Reggie money he owes him, feeling it is important to pay a debt. Reggie says Bobbie should try to remember dates for his wife, but Bobbie does not think dates really matter.

For months, Bobbie continues to forget things despite warnings from Reggie. One day in their club, a distressed Bobbie tells Reggie that Mary has left him. She wrote him a letter saying that she will only return when Bobbie cares enough to remember her birthday, which Bobbie has forgotten. After Reggie and Bobbie discuss other ideas for determining her birthday, Bobbie suggests they search through astrology books that describe the character of people born in certain months to find a description that matches Mary. This plan is unsuccessful, as each character description is applicable to Mary.

Bobbie thinks hard about the problem for weeks, and Reggie observes that Bobbie is becoming more mindful as a result of his efforts. Eventually, Bobbie remembers the show he and Mary saw on her last birthday at the Coliseum, narrowing the search down to six days in May. In the middle of the night, Bobbie calls Reggie, waking him up, and says they saw a matinée, which means the show was on Wednesday or Saturday. Reggie reminds him that there are daily matinées at the Coliseum, which disappoints Bobbie.

Reggie remembers that he had lunch with Bobbie that day, which Bobbie paid for. Bobbie looks in his cheque-book and happily discovers their lunch was on the eighth. Reggie then calls a hotel, and asks to speak to Mrs. Cardew. He tells her that Bobbie has remembered her birthday. Initially excited, she asks if Bobbie has been worried. Proud of their scheme, Reggie replies that Bobbie has been very worried, and is surprised when Mary berates him for letting Bobbie become so concerned. In the end, Reggie notes that he is still Bobbie's friend but is scorned by Mary, despite having acted with the best intentions.

The British edition of the story takes place in London while the American edition takes place in New York. In both versions, Reggie's wealth was inherited from his uncle, though in the British edition, the money came from the coal industry, whereas in the American version, it came from the safety razor industry. The American version is slightly longer.

=== "Helping Freddie" ===
- UK: Strand Magazine, September 1911
- US: Pictorial Review, March 1912 (as "Lines and Business")

The story was later rewritten as a Jeeves story. (See "Fixing it for Freddie".)

=== "Disentangling Old Percy" ===
Reggie Pepper and Florence Craye in "Disentangling Old Percy", illustrated by Alfred Leete (Strand, 1912)

- UK: Strand Magazine, August 1912
- US: Collier's Weekly, 30 March 1912 (as "Disentangling Old Duggie")

Plot

The well-meaning young gentleman Reggie Pepper advises his friend Percy Craye to consult a palmist named Dorothea. Though initially reluctant, Percy is ultimately happy after meeting Dorothea, who is really a widow named Mrs. Dorothy Darrell. Percy makes money after being encouraged by her optimistic reading and thinks she is wonderful. Three weeks later, Florence Craye, Percy's older sister, tells Reggie that Percy is engaged to the palmist. Florence is class-conscious and strongly disapproves of the match.

Hoping to help Percy, Reggie suggests that if Florence acts as if she approves the match and invites Percy and Dorothea to the family's country house, Percy will realize that he does not belong with Dorothy and will end the engagement. Florence likes the idea and tells Reggie to come to the house with Percy and Dorothy. Reggie informs Percy about the plan; Percy is confident that his love for Dorothy will prevail.

At the Crayes' country house, Percy really does change his mind about the engagement under Florence's influence, and Dorothy leaves for London. Back in London, Reggie sees Percy's older brother Edwin, Lord Weeting, who is unusually happy. Florence is upset after learning that Edwin has been spending time with Dorothy, and orders Reggie to talk to Dorothy. Reggie learns from Dorothy that she is becoming close to Edwin to get revenge on Florence, though she is also genuinely helping Edwin learn to enjoy life after being oppressed by Florence. Dorothy does not deny that she is engaged to Edwin. Florence commands Reggie to tell her widowed father, Mr. Craye, Lord Worplesdon, that Edwin is engaged to a palm reader.

Reggie goes to Worplesdon's club and tells him that Edwin is engaged to a palmist, but Worplesdon does not seem to disapprove. Edwin arrives, and Worplesdon sees that Edwin is happier than before. Worplesdon and Edwin have fun in London. To avoid Florence, Reggie goes to Nice in France. He is surprised to find Edwin there, enjoying himself. He also sees Dorothy, who became friends with Lord Worplesdon after helping Edwin enjoy life. Dorothy says that she hopes someday to win Florence over because she wants all her children to love her. This confuses Reggie. Dorothy explains that she considers Lord Worplesdon's children her own since she married Lord Worplesdon.

The British version of the story, "Disentangling Old Percy", takes place in London, while the American version of the story, "Disentangling Old Duggie", is set in New York. Reggie Pepper's friend is named Percy Craye in the English version and Douglas or "Duggie" Craye in the American version. In the British version, the elder Craye has the title "Lord Worplesdon" and Edwin is "Lord Weeting", while in the American version, the family lives near Philadelphia and is not part of the British peerage.

=== "Rallying Round Old George" ===
- UK: Strand Magazine, December 1912
- US: Collier's Weekly, 27 September 1913 (as "Brother Alfred")

The story was later rewritten as a Mr. Mulliner story. (See "George and Alfred".)

=== "Doing Clarence A Bit of Good" ===
- UK: Strand Magazine, May 1913
- US: Pictorial Review, April 1914 (as "Rallying Round Clarence")

The story was later rewritten as a Jeeves story. (See "Jeeves Makes an Omelette".)

=== "Concealed Art" ===
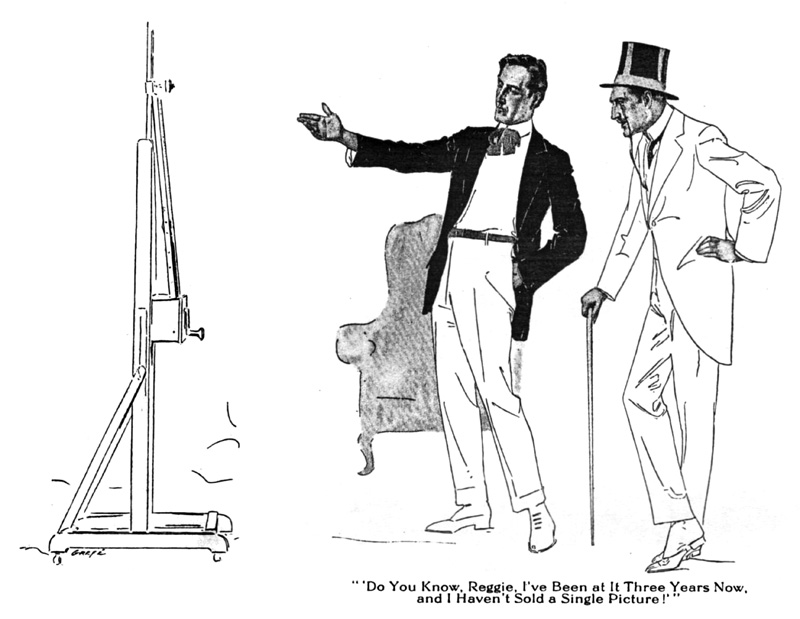
Archie and Reggie Pepper in "Concealed Art", illustrated by Will Grefé (Pictorial Review, 1915)

- UK: Strand Magazine, February 1915
- US: Pictorial Review, July 1915

Plot

Reggie has a friend named Archibald "Archie" Ferguson, an artist whose abstract works are ahead of his time, though Reggie finds them ugly. Archie has not sold any paintings. He confesses to Reggie that to earn a living, he illustrates slapstick cartoons about the "Doughnut" family in a magazine called Funny Slices. Reggie enjoys the cartoons and congratulates Archie, but Archie is afraid of telling his fiancée, the spiritual poet Eunice Nugent, that he draws cartoons.

Meeting Eunice, Reggie quickly perceives that she is indeed serious and spiritual. He thinks Archie should not tell her about the cartoons and suggests that Archie claim his money comes from B. and O. P. Rails, a company that Archie really has invested in. Archie follows this advice and soon Archie and Eunice get married. Around seven months later, Archie comes to Reggie in distress. The value of B. O. and P. stock has plummeted, and Archie has lost his savings, but his true problem is that he cannot explain his continuing income to Eunice. Archie is unwilling to tell her about the money he makes from cartoons, so the couple lives off Eunice's small private means and moves to a less expensive residence.

Reggie thinks hard about the problem, his manner becoming so distrait as a result that he inadvertently hurts the feelings of his valet Wilberforce, which Reggie makes up for by tipping him two pounds. Eventually, Reggie comes up with an idea. He calls Archie and tells him to claim he obtained his money by selling his painting "The Coming of Summer" to the American millionaire J. Bellingwood Brackett, who lives in London and often buys artwork. Archie follows through on this plan and decides to tell Eunice he was paid two thousand pounds, a remarkably large sum.

A newspaper reports that Brackett paid two thousand pounds for Archie's painting. Eunice had told the papers about the story. Renshaw Liggett, Brackett's representative, visits the Ferguson home to tell Archie to publicly deny the story. Liggett leaves after Archie agrees. He reveals to Eunice that his money comes from the Doughnut cartoons, which he shows to her. Surprising Reggie and Archie, Eunice finds the cartoon hilarious. She admits that she lied about her private means and is in fact an advertisement copywriter. Archie and Eunice share a heartfelt embrace, and Reggie sidles out.

In the American edition, the story takes place in New York instead of London and Archie's painting is reportedly sold for ten thousand dollars rather than two thousand pounds.

=== "The Test Case" ===
"The Test Case" illustration by Lewis Baumer (Pearson's, 1915)

- UK: Pearson's Magazine, December 1915
- US: Illustrated Sunday Magazine, 12 December 1915

Plot

Reggie states that he was once in love with Ann Selby. Though he is now glad that she refused him, he feels that she did not treat him fairly. He then recounts the following story. Not for the first time, Reggie proposes to Ann Selby. Instead of refusing him as usual, she says that Reggie seems brainless but might have potential. However, she is hesitant about marriage because of what is happening between her sister Hilda and Hilda's husband, Reggie's friend Harold Bodkin. Harold often praises his deceased first wife Amelia, and every evening he goes into the studio room at the top of their house to meditate on Amelia's memory and lay flowers in front of her portrait. Hilda feels unappreciated, but pretends not to mind. Reggie assures Ann that he is not like Harold. Ann agrees to marry Reggie if Reggie does something to prove his intelligence.

To prove himself and to help a friend, Reggie decides to address the situation with Harold and Hilda. He plans to make Harold overdo his meditations on Amelia so that Harold will get tired of it. Reggie talks to Harold, who is oblivious that Hilda is upset, and persuades Harold to postpone dinner in order to spend more time with Amelia's portrait each evening. This displeases Harold's butler Ponsonby since he needs to work longer. Reggie also gets Harold to invite Amelia's ill-mannered brother Percy to the house. Lastly, Reggie intends to use a wedge to jam the studio room door and trap Harold there for a few hours.

After hearing someone enter the studio room, Reggie jams the door shut with a wedge and then dines out, returning a few hours later. He sees Ann, who says that Hilda, fed up with Harold's latest actions, announced she would leave Harold. Reggie explains that he suggested Harold lengthen his meditations and invite Percy as part of a larger plan. Ann disapproves, but notes that Hilda's actions prompted Harold to change. Earlier that day, Harold called Ponsonby and told him to take down Amelia's portrait. Harold then appears and says that he cannot find Ponsonby. Reggie, realizing where Ponsonby is, is struck speechless.

Harold finds the studio door locked and hears Ponsonby's voice. Harold lets him out, and Ponsonby gives notice before heading to the pantry to eat. Admitting that he shut Ponsonby in the room, Reggie explains that he was trying to trap Harold. Ann thinks that Reggie is a practical joker and denounces him. Reggie tries to defend himself to Ann, but is unsuccessful.

In the British edition, the story is set in England, and Harold and Hilda live in Hertfordshire. In the American edition, the story takes place in America, and Harold and Hilda live in Long Island.

== Publication history ==
In the magazine publications, "Absent Treatment" was illustrated by Joseph Simpson (UK) and Wallace Morgan (US). "Helping Freddie" was illustrated by H. M. Brock (UK) and Phillipps Ward (US). "Disentangling Old Duggie" was illustrated by Alfred Leete (UK) and Wallace Morgan (US). "Rallying Round Old George" was illustrated by Charles Crombie (UK) and Wallace Morgan (US). "Doing Clarence a Bit of Good" was illustrated by Charles Crombie (UK) and James Montgomery Flagg (US). "Concealed Art" was illustrated by Alfred Leete (UK) and Will Grefé (US). "The Test Case" was illustrated by Lewis Baumer (UK) and F. Foster Lincoln (US).

"Disentangling Old Duggie" was reprinted with Leete's illustrations in the UK periodical Newnes Summer Annual in 1915. "Disentangling Old Percy" was collected in the 1929 anthology The Legion Book, published by Cassell, and was published in The Golden Book Magazine (US) in October 1934. The story was included in the 1959 anthology A Cavalcade of Collier's.

The British versions of "Absent Treatment", "Helping Freddie", "Rallying Round Old George" and "Doing Clarence A Bit of Good" were collected along with four early Jeeves stories in My Man Jeeves, published in May 1919. The American versions of "Absent Treatment", "Brother Alfred" and "Rallying Round Clarence" were collected in the American edition of The Man with Two Left Feet, published in 1933.

The plots of three of these early stories were re-worked to feature other Wodehouse characters. "Helping Freddie" was rewritten as the Jeeves story "Fixing it for Freddie" (1925), "Doing Clarence a Bit of Good" was rewritten as the Jeeves story "Jeeves Makes an Omelette" (1958), and "Rallying Round Old George" was rewritten as the Mr Mulliner story "George and Alfred" (1966).

"The Test Case" was included in The Uncollected Wodehouse (1976). The British versions of "Disentangling Old Percy", "Concealed Art" and "The Test Case" were published in the second volume of Plum Stones in 1993 by Galahad Books, a specialist Wodehouse publisher. All the Reggie Pepper stories, along with some early Jeeves stories, were published in the collection Enter Jeeves by Dover Publications in 1997. With the exception of "Disentangling Old Duggie", all the Reggie Pepper stories featured in this collection are actually the British editions with the American titles, despite the collection's bibliographic note stating that some of the stories are from their original American publications.

== Adaptations ==
The Reggie Pepper story "Rallying Round Old George" was adapted into the play Brother Alfred by Wodehouse and Herbert Westbrook, and presented at the Savoy Theatre in April 1913. This play starred and was produced by Lawrence Grossmith. The British comedy film Brother Alfred, based on the play, was released in 1932.

Two silent short comedy films, "Making Good with Mother" and "Cutting Out Venus", released in the US in 1919, were inspired by the Reggie Pepper stories. The short films were directed by Lawrence C. Windom. Reggie Pepper was given a manservant named "Jeeves", inspired by the Wodehouse character Jeeves. In the films, Jeeves was a reformed burglar. Lawrence Grossmith portrayed Reggie Pepper and Charles Coleman portrayed Jeeves.

Five of the Reggie Pepper stories were read by Martin Jarvis on BBC Radio 4 in a series titled The Reggie Pepper Stories. The episodes, broadcast from 8 to 12 August 2015, included "Absent Treatment", "Lines and Business", "Disentangling Old Percy", "The Test Case", and "Concealed Art".
