= Bill Charmatz =

Bill Charmatz (1925–2005) was an American illustrator.

== Biography ==
Born Adolph Charmatz in East New York, Brooklyn, to Russian immigrant parents, he adopted the name Bill during his education at the High School of Art and Design in New York.

Charmatz served in the U.S. Navy during World War II in a graphics unit, focusing on chart renderings. He later studied at the École des Beaux-Arts and the Grande Chaumière in Paris in the late 1940s and early 1950s.

Under the mentorship of Alexey Brodovitch, Harper's Bazaar's art director, Charmatz created numerous drawings and watercolors depicting everyday life in France.

His works were featured in publications such as Esquire, TV Guide, Time, Life, and The New York Times. Notably, he was a regular illustrator for The New York Times Book Review's Crime column from 1996 to 2004. He also contributed to advertising campaigns for WCBS-AM and American Express.

In addition to his commercial work, Charmatz wrote and illustrated children's books and published a collection of cartoons titled Endeerments (1971), which included pun-based line drawings. His artistic style showed influences from European cartoonists such as André François, Raymond Savignac, and Georg Grosz.

Charmatz's work in Sports Illustrated during the 1960s and 1970s, particularly his pictorial essays on sporting events, was a significant aspect of his career. He also produced a series of paintings for The Lamp, a magazine published by ExxonMobil.

== Personal life ==
Charmatz's marriage to Marianne Flender ended in divorce, and he was survived by his daughter, Katrina, a television producer. He died in 2005 at his home in Manhattan.

== Bibliography ==
- The Little Duster (1967)
- The Cat's Whiskers (1969)
- Endeerments (1971)
- The Troy St. Bus (1977)
