= Indiscretions of Archie =

1921 short story collection by P. G. Wodehouse

First edition (UK)

Indiscretions of Archie is a novel by P. G. Wodehouse, first published in the United Kingdom on 14 February 1921 by Herbert Jenkins, London, and in the United States on 15 July 1921 by George H. Doran, New York.

The book was adapted from a series of short stories, originally serialised in the Strand in the United Kingdom between March 1920 and February 1921, and, all except one, in Cosmopolitan in the United States between May 1920 and February 1921. The stories were rewritten and reorganised to create a more flowing novel form.

The novel tells the story of impoverished, embarrassment-prone Archibald "Archie" Moffam (pronounced "Moom") and his difficult relationship with his art-collecting, hotel-owning, millionaire father-in-law Daniel Brewster, who is the father of Archie's new bride Lucille. Archie's attempts to ingratiate himself with Brewster only get him further into trouble. The story takes place in New York City.

== Contents ==
The original story titles and publication dates were as follows:

- "The Man Who Married an Hotel"
  - UK: Strand, March 1920
  - US: Cosmopolitan, May 1920 (as "The Man Who Married a Hotel")
- "Archie and the Sausage Chappie"
  - UK: Strand, April 1920
  - US: Cosmopolitan, June 1920 (as "The Sausage Chappie")
- "Dear Old Squiffy"
  - UK: Strand, May 1920
  - US: Cosmopolitan, July 1920
- "Doing Father a Bit of Good"
  - UK: Strand, June 1920
  - US: Cosmopolitan, August 1920
- "Paving the Way for Mabel"
  - UK: Strand, July 1920
  - US: Cosmopolitan, September 1920
- "Washy Makes His Presence Felt"
  - UK: Strand, August 1920
  - US: Cosmopolitan, October 1920
- "A Room at the Hermitage"
  - UK: Strand, September 1920
  - US: Cosmopolitan, November 1920 (as "A Bit of All Right")
- "First Aid For Looney Biddle"
  - UK: Strand, October 1920
  - US: Cosmopolitan, December 1920
- "Mother's Knee"
  - UK: Strand, November 1920
  - US: Cosmopolitan, January 1921
- "Strange Experience of an Artist's Model"
  - UK: Strand, January 1921
- "The Wigmore Venus"
  - UK: Strand, February 1921
  - US: Cosmopolitan, February 1921

== Plot ==
Illustration by A. Wallis Mills for "The Man Who Married an Hotel", Strand Magazine, 1920

Archie Moffam is an Englishman in New York. Like Bertie Wooster he's kind hearted but mentally limited, if not negligible. Unlike Bertie he has no private income. He's a veteran of the First World War.

During a stay in New York he bitterly criticises the service at the Cosmopolis Hotel, thus making an enemy of its owner, Daniel Brewster. On a subsequent trip to Miami he meets, falls in love with and marries Brewster's daughter Lucille. Brewster is not delighted. Archie's attempts to make amends by finding employment and by purchasing a valuable objet d’art for Brewster end in disaster. Further indiscretions follow for Archie: he upsets Lucille by apparently paying too much attention to an actress; he bets $1000 on the Giants (then a New York baseball team), but gets into a fight with their star pitcher and injures his arm. He advises Lucille's brother, Bill, who has a habit of getting into relationships with girls of whom his father disapproves, and lends a hand to an old comrade from the war, “The Sausage Chappie”, who's lost his memory and forgotten his own name. He upsets Mrs Cora Bates McCall, a vegetarian and healthy food campaigner, by persuading her son to take part in a pie-eating contest. Then there's an incident with a painting which further upsets Brewster. Eventually he pacifies the old curmudgeon by telling him he's about to become a grandfather.

== Publication history ==
Title illustration by T. D. Skidmore for "The Sausage Chappie", Cosmopolitan, 1920

The Archie short stories published in the Strand between March 1920 and February 1921 were all illustrated by A. Wallis Mills. The stories published in Cosmopolitan between May 1920 and February 1921 were illustrated by T. D. Skidmore. In the Strand, none of the Archie stories were published in December 1920. A different Wodehouse story, "Sundered Hearts" (later collected in The Clicking of Cuthbert), was published in that issue.

"Dear Old Squiffy" was also published in The Golden Book Magazine (US), illustrated by H. M. Bateman, in January 1933.

The one story that was not published in Cosmopolitan, "Strange Experience of an Artist's Model", was collected in Wodehouse on Crime under the title "Indiscretions of Archie". Wodehouse on Crime was published on 14 September 1981 by Ticknor & Fields, New York, edited by D. R. Bensen with a foreword by Isaac Asimov.

The novel has a long dedication to "B. W. King-Hall". Baldwin King-Hall was a friend of Wodehouse who ran a school called Emsworth House in Emsworth.

== Adaptations ==
A BBC radio play titled "An Indiscretion of Archie" was broadcast in June 1931. It was performed by Pauline Bedford, Reg Palmer, Ernest Sefton, and Peter Haddon.

The book was adapted under the title The Indiscretions of Archie for BBC radio by Douglas Hoare in 1935, and again featured Peter Haddon. It was produced by John Watt and aired in six parts from April to June in 1935.
