= Fixing it for Freddie =

- Short story by P. G. Wodehouse
- Country: United Kingdom
- Language: English
- Genre: Comedy

Publication
- Publisher: The Strand Magazine
- Media type: Print (Magazine)
- Publication date: September 1911 (Reggie Pepper version); October 1925 (Jeeves version)

Chronology
- Series: Reggie Pepper (1911 version); Jeeves (1925 version)
Without the Option	Clustering Round Young Bingo

"Fixing it for Freddie" is a short story by P. G. Wodehouse, and features the young gentleman Bertie Wooster and his valet Jeeves. Originally starring Reggie Pepper, the story was published in The Strand Magazine as "Helping Freddie" in the United Kingdom in September 1911, and in Pictorial Review as "Lines and Business" in the United States in March 1912. The story was later changed to feature Bertie Wooster and Jeeves when it was included in the 1925 collection Carry On, Jeeves.

In the story "Fixing it for Freddie", Bertie tries to reunite his friend Freddie Bullivant with Freddie's ex-fiancée, Elizabeth Vickers. To accomplish this, Bertie comes up with a scheme involving a child he saw Elizabeth playing with, though this scheme does not go as planned.

== Plot ==
Freddie Bullivant, a friend of Bertie's, is upset after Freddie's fiancée, Elizabeth Vickers, broke off their engagement. Bertie is taking a cottage by the sea at Marvis Bay, Dorsetshire, and brings Freddie along to cheer him up. Meanwhile, Jeeves promises to consider Freddie's problem. At Marvis Bay, Freddie is still dejected. One day he sees Elizabeth, who is at Marvis Bay, too. She is cold to him. While walking on the beach, Bertie sees her playing with a young child. Bertie deduces that the child is Elizabeth's cousin. Bertie gets an idea: if he kidnaps the child, then Freddie can return the child to Elizabeth, telling her he found the lost child and essentially saved his life, and Elizabeth will be so grateful that she will renew their engagement.

Bertie brings the kid back to his cottage and explains his scheme to Freddie. Freddie brings the child to Elizabeth, but returns and reports bitterly that Elizabeth doesn't know the child. After asking a sweet-stall man who sees the child often, Bertie learns that the child is from the Kegworthy family living at Ocean Rest. Bertie goes there, and Mr. Kegworthy recognizes his son, calling him Tootles. Kegworthy says the household has the mumps, and they did not know where to put Tootles. He trusts Bertie since he knows Bertie's Aunt Agatha, and asks him to look after Tootles for a few days. Annoyed, Bertie walks away with Tootles. They meet Elizabeth, and she mistakenly thinks Bertie is the child's father. Bertie and Freddie take care of the child, but they struggle. Bertie pays a nurse to help.

Jeeves tells Bertie about a movie he saw. At first Bertie is upset that Jeeves is forgetting his promise, but apologizes after Jeeves explains that the movie gave him an idea: Tootles will say "Kiss Freddie!" to Elizabeth and then Freddie will say something bashful; thus, Elizabeth will be moved to reconcile with him. Jeeves and Bertie train Tootles by giving him sweets when he says "Kiss Freddie!".

And then she began to laugh. I never heard a girl laugh so much. She leaned against the side of the veranda and shrieked. And all the while Freddie, the World's Champion Dumb Brick, standing there, saying nothing.

— Elizabeth laughs and Freddie is speechless

However, Elizabeth, on her way to the beach, spots the child and approaches. She offers him sweets, and the child shouts, "Kiss Fweddie!". Freddie comes out and, not knowing Bertie's scheme, fails to say anything. The child continues to shout, until Bertie, defeated, tells Elizabeth she must give the child the sweets. Bertie confesses the plan, and Elizabeth laughs. Bertie sidles away and meets Jeeves, who is just returning from a walk. He tells Jeeves that the plan is over, but is startled when he sees a crowd gathering in front of the cottage. On the porch, Freddie and Elizabeth are embracing. Jeeves observes that things have ended well after all.

== Differences between editions ==
The story originally featured Reggie Pepper instead of Bertie Wooster. In the Reggie Pepper version of the story, Reggie helps his friend Freddie Meadowes reunite with a girl named Angela West. The playwright Jimmy Pinkerton, a friend of Reggie and Freddie who joins them in Marvis Bay, comes up with the plan to train Tootles (whose surname is Medwin) to say "Kiss Freddie". Jimmy is inspired to come up with this plan by his experience in theatre, whereas in the later version of the story, Jeeves suggests this plan after being inspired by a silent film. Otherwise, the plot of the story is largely the same as the later version with Bertie Wooster and Jeeves.

The American edition of the Reggie Pepper story takes place in America (in New York and Pine Beach) rather than England (in London and Marvis Bay).

== Publication history ==
Originally published as a Reggie Pepper story, the story was changed to include Bertie and Jeeves and titled "Fixing it for Freddie" when included in Carry On, Jeeves. The first magazine appearance of this version was in the Canadian Home Journal in September 1928. Later, the story was rewritten again with new characters when included in the 1959 American publication of the collection A Few Quick Ones. This version was a Drones Club story titled "Unpleasantness at Kozy Kot".

"Helping Freddie", featuring Reggie Pepper, was illustrated by H. M. Brock in the Strand. "Lines and Business" was illustrated by Phillipps Ward in Pictorial Review. The later version of the story with Bertie and Jeeves, "Fixing it for Freddie", was illustrated by J. E. Dinsmore in the Canadian Home Journal. This story was included in the 1983 collection P. G. Wodehouse Short Stories, published by The Folio Society with drawings by George Adamson. The version titled "Unpleasantness at Kozy Kot" was illustrated by Jack Bush in the Canadian magazine Star Weekly in 1959.

The British version of the Reggie Pepper story was included, albeit under the American title "Lines and Business", in Enter Jeeves by Dover Publications, a 1997 collection featuring all the Reggie Pepper stories and several early Jeeves stories.

== Adaptations ==
The Jeeves version of the story, "Fixing it for Freddie", was adapted as an episode of the BBC television series The World of Wooster. The episode, originally broadcast on 17 November 1967, was titled "Jeeves and the Fixing of Freddie".

"Fixing it for Freddie" was adapted into the Jeeves and Wooster episode "Return to New York", the first episode of the fourth series, which first aired on 16 May 1993. There are some differences in plot, including:

- Freddie Bullivant does not appear in the episode, and is replaced by another friend of Bertie's, Hildebrand "Tuppy" Glossop.
- The episode takes place in Bay Shore, New York rather than in England.
- Bertie is with Jeeves when he kidnaps the child in the episode, though Jeeves does not approve of the plan.
- In the episode, Bertie and Jeeves, hiding behind bushes, wave sweets to prompt the child to say his line while Tuppy and Elizabeth are arguing.
