= The Golden Book Magazine =

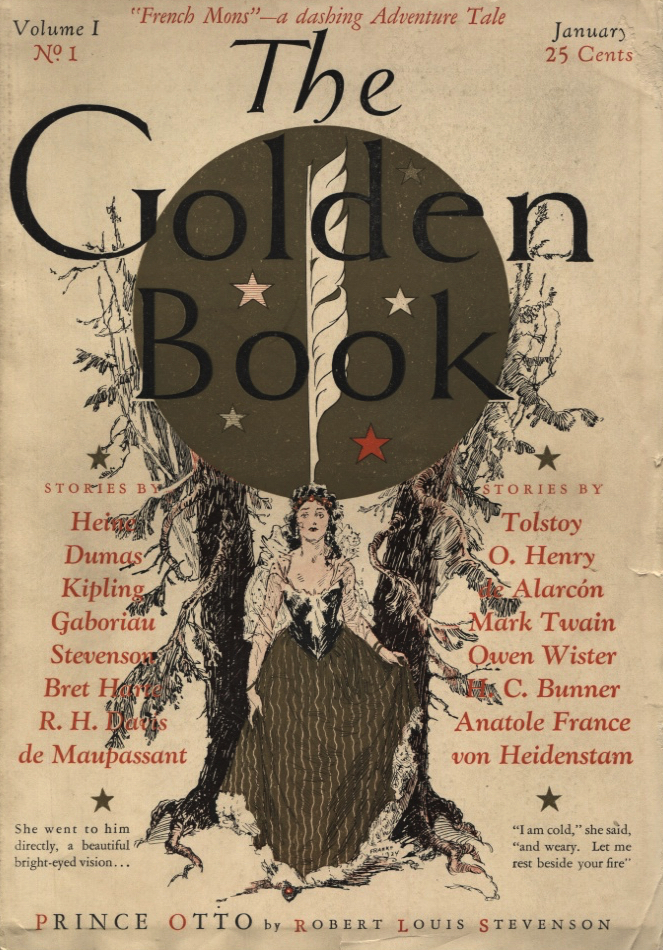
- First issue
- Categories: Fiction
- Frequency: Monthly
- First issue: 1925
- Final issue: 1935
- Company: Review of Reviews Corporation
- Country: United States
- Based in: New York City
- Language: English
- OCLC: 8337628

The Golden Book Magazine, was an American magazine publishing short fiction that ran from January 1925 to 1935. Based in New York City, the magazine was published monthly. The publisher was Review of Reviews Corporation. In October 1935 the magazine merged with Fiction Parade; Fiction Parade and Golden Book ceased publication in 1938.
