= Midwood Books =

American publishing house

- Parent company: Tower Publications
- Status: Defunct 1968; 58 years ago
- Founded: 1957; 69 years ago
- Founder: Harry Shorten
- Defunct: 1962
- Country of origin: United States
- Headquarters location: 505 Eighth Avenue; New York City, New York, United States
- Key people: Paul Rader, Lawrence Block, Donald E. Westlake, Robert Silverberg, Richard E. Geis
- Publication types: Paperback books, pulp fiction
- Fiction genres: Romance, erotic literature
- Official website: Midwood Books

Midwood Books was an American publishing house active from 1957 to 1968. Its strategy focused on the male readers' market, competing with other publishers such as Beacon Books. The covers of many Midwood Books featured works by prolific illustrators of the era, including Paul Rader.

Novels from Midwood Books were written by many well-known authors, most writing under pseudonyms. Among these were Lawrence Block, Donald E. Westlake, Robert Silverberg, and Richard E. Geis.

== History ==
Harry Shorten was a writer and editor who had worked for MLJ Comics, publisher of Archie, for most of the 1940s and 1950s. He had made his fortune by creating, with comics artist Al Fagaly, a syndicated gag cartoon called There Oughta Be a Law!.

Looking for an investment in the financial results of his comics, Shorten decided to become an editor of paperbacks. He wanted to follow the example of publishers Beacon Books and Universal Distributing, which specialized in publishing cheap, lightweight books telling dramatic or erotic romances, with suggestive covers, for a male audience. Thus he created in 1957 the publishing house Midwood Books, named after his neighborhood in Brooklyn. At the time, the publishing house address was 505 Eighth Avenue in Manhattan.

Unlike other New York publishers such as Bennett Cerf at Random House, Shorten did not have extensive knowledge of quality literature. But he knew what would entice the average American reader. His books were bright, colorful, and eye-catching. Midwood's first publications were paperback collections of the There Oughta Be a Law! strips and an unnumbered book series in the same style as Beacon Books. With the 1958 release of Midwood 007 — Love Nest, by Robert Silverberg, writing as "Loren Beauchamp" — began the emergence of authors and artists recognized later as appurtenant to Midwood. Shorten quickly began soliciting manuscripts from the Scott Meredith Literary Agency (which also provided manuscripts for fellow pulp publisher Nightstand Books).

Only five people wrote most of the first 40 issues of the Midwood numbered series: Lawrence Block ("Sheldon Lord"), Robert Silverberg ("Loren Beauchamp"), Donald E. Westlake ("Alan Marshall""), Orrie Hitt, and Hal Dresner ("Don Holliday"). This group stabilized Midwood until Shorten was able to put together a stable of recurring writers, such as Sally Singer, Gilbert Fox, Julie Ellis, John Plunkett, and Elaine Williams. Although nobody at Midwood knew it at the time, several writers were providing books for both Midwood and Nightstand, but under different pen names. For example, "Loren Beauchamp" (Robert Silverberg) become "Don Elliott" a year later at Nightstand, "Sheldon Lord" (Lawrence Block) became "Andrew Shaw." Some writers wrote under the same name for both publishers.

Shorten obtained his cover illustrations from the Art Balcourt Service, the same agency that provided covers for Beacon. Artists such as Nappi, Rader, and Robert Maguire were significant to the company's success. The covers sold the books: Midwood's novels were not great literature, but were generally very entertaining. Many pages contained sex scenes, described as pornographic, full of insinuations and veiled references. Although romances and melodramas were of more interest to women, the target audience of companies like Midwood and Beacon was men. This was apparent from their covers.

In 1964, Midwood merged with Tower Publications to form two subsidiaries: Midwood-Tower and Tower Comics. Shorten went on to be editor-in-chief of Tower Comics. By 1965, Midwood's headquarters were at 185 Madison Avenue (alongside fellow pulp publisher Lancer Books).

== Popularity among lesbians ==
Pulp titles with strong connotations of lesbians were very popular; the authors were frequently men using female pen names, such as "Barbara Brooks," "Jill Emerson," and "Kimberly Kemp;" while the target audience was male readers, an unexpected second small audience base was lesbians themselves, with these books often reviewed in early lesbian and gay publications such as One Magazine and The Ladder by Barbara Grier, under her pseudonym "Gene Damon." Julie Ellis, though not lesbian herself (unlike Singer and Williams), bucked her bosses by insisting on putting happy endings for the lesbian lovers in her lesbian pulp fiction, a brave act for which she received much appreciative fan mail from emerging lesbian social and activist groups during Ellis's Midwood-Tower authorship period (1962-1968).

== Authors ==
- Lawrence Block, writing as "Sheldon Lord"
- Hal Dresner, writing as "Don Holliday"
- Julie Ellis, writing as "Joan Ellis," "Susan Richards," and similar pseudonyms
- Gilbert Fox, writing as "Dallas Mayo" and "Kimberly Kemp" for his lesbian novels and "Paul Russo" for his heterosexual books
- Richard E. Geis, writing as "Peggy Swenson"
- Jay Greene
- Orrie Hitt
- Al James
- Stuart James
- William Johnston
- William Knoles, writing as "Clyde Allison"
- Barry N. Malzberg, writing as "Mel Johnson".
- Pat Perdue, writing as "Randy Salem"
- John Plunkett, writing as "Jason Sloane Hytes"
- Robert Silverberg, writing as "Loren Beauchamp"
- Sally Singer, writing as "March Hastings"
- Donald E. Westlake, writing as "Alan Marshall"
- Elaine Williams, writing as "Sloane Britain" and similar pseudonyms. Some have stated she committed suicide in 1963 as a result of the social stigma she suffered as a lesbian. Other sources indicate that the car she was in skidded on snow and hit a tree head-on, killing Williams and gravely injuring her husband at the time.

== Pricing Codes ==
Beginning with book 395, Midwood introduced a pricing code as the prefix to the book series number. Midwood books codes were the 32, 33, 34, 35, 37, and 38. Tower books codes were the 42, 43, 44, 45, 46, and 47.

- 32 = $.50
- 33 = $.60
- 34 = $.75
- 35 = $.95
- 37 = $1.25
- 38 = $1.75
- 42 = $.50
- 43 = $.60
- 44 = $.75
- 45 = $.95
- 46 = $.45
- 47 = $1.25

After Midwood 37-339 the publisher divides into 3 new price series:

M-125-x ($1.25), M-175-x ($1.75) and M-195-x ($1.95).

== Popularity Among Collectors ==
Many Midwood covers are collectible due to the artists that produced the artwork. Artwork by Paul Rader can add significant value to a paperback. Other popular artists who produced covers for Midwood include Ron Lesser, Randy Nappi, Jerome Podwill, and Robert E. Schultz.

== Selected titles ==
=== Series 1-394 ===
- Midwood 1: There Oughta Be A Law! by Harry Shorten & Al Fagaly
- Midwood 2: [NOT ISSUED]
- Midwood 3: [NOT ISSUED]
- Midwood 4: There Oughta Be A Law! by Harry Shorten & Al Fagaly
- Midwood 5: I Take What I Want by Hal Ellson
- Midwood 6: Call Me Mistress by Tomlin Rede
- 1958 Midwood 7: Love Nest, by Loren Beauchamp — the first numbered titled in the Midwood series
- 1958 Midwood 8: Carla, by Sheldon Lord
- 1959 Midwood 9: A Strange Kind of Love, by Sheldon Lord
- Midwood 10: Affair With Lucy by Orrie Hitt
- Midwood 11: Immoral Wife by Gordon Mitchell
- Midwood 12: Girl Of The Streets by Orrie Hitt
- Midwood 13: Hired Lover by Fred Martin
- 1959 Midwood 14: Born to Be Bad, by Sheldon Lord
- 1959 Midwood 15: All My Lovers, by Alan Marshall — later reprinted as Midwood 129 (1960)
- Midwood 16: Summer Romance by Orrie Hitt
- 1959 Midwood 17: Backstage Love (Vol. I of the Phil Crawford trilogy), by Alan Marshall — later reprinted as Midwood 149: Apprentice Virgin (1962)
- Midwood 18: Connie by Loren Beauchamp
- Midwood 19: Only The Bed by Don Holiday
- 1959 Midwood 20: Man Hungry, by Alan Marshall — later reprinted as Midwood 147 (1961)
- Midwood 21: Unwilling Sinner by Loren Beauchamp
- 1959 Midwood 22: Sally, by Alan Marshall — later reprinted as Midwood 062 (1960)
- Midwood 23: As Bad As They Come by Orrie Hitt
- 1959 Midwood 24: 69 Barrow Street, by Sheldon Lord
- Midwood 25: Sin School by Don Holliday
- Midwood 26: Just Ask For Margaret by W.B. Tasker
- 1960 Midwood 27: Another Night, Another Love by Loren Beauchamp by although numbered as 29 is assumed to be 27
- 1960 Midwood 28: All the Girls Were Willing (Vol. II of the Phil Crawford trilogy), by Alan Marshall — later reprinted as Midwood 166: What Girls Will Do (1962)
- 1960 Midwood 29: Another Night, Another Love: An Original Novel, by Loren Beauchamp
- Midwood 29: Of Shame And Joy by Sheldon Lord
- 1960 Midwood 30: Meg, by Loren Beauchamp
- 1960 Midwood 31: The Wife Next Door, by Alan Marshall
- 1960 Midwood 33: A Woman Must Love, by Sheldon Lord
- Midwood 34: The Cheaters by Orrie Hitt
- 1960 Midwood 35: Kept, by Sheldon Lord
- 1960 Midwood 36: Virgin's Summer, by Alan Marshall
- Midwood 37: Anybody's Girl by March Hastings
- Midwood 38: A Doctor And His Mistress by Orrie Hitt
- Midwood 39: The Sins Of Martha Leslie by Don Holliday
- 1960 Midwood 40: Candy, by Sheldon Lord
- 1960 Midwood 41: A Girl Called Honey, by Sheldon Lord & Alan Marshall — dedication: "This is for Don Westlake and Larry Block, who introduced us"
- Midwood 42: Stag Model by James Harvey
- Midwood 43: Chita by Max Gareth
- Midwood 44: Strange Breed by Aldo Lucchesi
- Midwood 45: Two Of A Kind by Orrie Hitt
- Midwood 46: Glad To Be Bad by Adam Roberts
- Midwood 47: Unnatural by Sloan Britton
- 1960 Midwood 48: So Willing, by Sheldon Lord & Alan Marshall — dedication: "to Nedra & Loretta" [Nedra Westlake and Loretta Block]
- Midwood 49: Farm Girl by George Cassidy
- Midwood 50: Ladies' Masseur by James Harvey
- 1960 Midwood 51: All About Annette, by Alan Marshall
- Midwood 52: Meet Marilyn by Sloane Britain
- Midwood 53: The Unashamed by March Hastings
- Midwood 54: Lana by Joan Ellis
- 1960 Midwood 55: 21 Gay Street: An Original Novel, by Sheldon Lord — later reprinted as Midwood Y159
- 1960 Midwood 56: The Blonde: An Original Novel, by Peggy Swenson
- Midwood 56: The Blonde by Peggy Swenson
- Midwood 57: Insatiable by Sloane Britain
- Midwood 58: Sabrina And The Senator by Nick Vendor
- Midwood 59: A Twilight Affair by James Harvey
- Midwood 60: All The Way by Mike Avallone
- Midwood 61: Flame by Joan Ellis
- Midwood 62: Sally by Alan Marshall
- Midwood 63: The Unfortunate Flesh by Randy Salem
- Midwood 64: Million Dollar Mistress by Clyde Allison
- 1960 Midwood 65: Nurse Carolyn, by Loren Beauchamp
- Midwood 66: Sin School by Don Holliday
- Midwood 67: A Touch Of Depravity by Paul V. Russo
- 1961 Midwood 68: There Oughta Be a Law! by Harry Shorten and Al Fagaly
- Midwood 69: Liza's Apartment by Joan Ellis
- Midwood 70: Sin On Wheels by Loren Beauchamp
- Midwood 71: A Woman by Bruce Elliott
- Midwood 72: The Path Between by Jay Warren
- Midwood 73: The Sex Peddlers by Clyde Allison
- 1960 Midwood 74: Connie: An Original Novel, by Loren Beauchamp
- Midwood 74: Connie by Loren Beauchamp
- Midwood 75: Common-Law Wife by Karl Kramer
- Midwood 76: Pleasure Girl by Joan Ellis
- Midwood 77: Bucks County Report by Stuart James
- Midwood 78: Restless Virgin by Paul V. Russo
- Midwood 79: Your Sins And Mine by George Parksmith
- Midwood 80: The Jealous And The Free by March Hastings
- Midwood 81: School For Sex by Arnold English
- Midwood 82: These Curious Pleasures by Sloane Britain
- Midwood 83: One Flesh by Paul V. Russo
- Midwood 84: Lament For A Virgin by Art Serra
- Midwood 85: Silky by Dallas Mayo
- Midwood 86: The Fires Within by Loren Beauchamp
- Midwood 87: Drive-In Girl by R.C. Gold
- Midwood 88: Stag Starlet by Paul V. Russo
- Midwood 89: Middle Of Time by James Wyckoff
- Midwood 90: Step Down To Darkness by David Highsmith
- Midwood 91: Sex Behavior Of The American Housewife by W.D. Sprague
- Midwood 92: The Weekend by Thomas Cox
- Midwood 93: A Moment's Pleasure by Clyde Merrick
- Midwood 94: This Yielding Flesh by Paul V. Russo
- Midwood 95: Gay Interlude by Carol Clanton
- Midwood 96: Jews Without Money by Michael Gold
- Midwood 97: Desire Under The Sun by George McGhee
- Midwood 98: Kitten by Dallas Mayo
- Midwood 99: Redhead by Joan Ellis
- Midwood 100: A Need For Love by Dallas Mayo
- Midwood 101: Morals Charge by Paul Hunter
- Midwood 102: And When She Was Bad by Loren Beauchamp
- Midwood 103: 69 Barrow Street by Sheldon Lord
- Midwood 104: Judge Not My Sins by Stuart James
- Midwood 105: All My Pretty Ones by Roger Hall
- Midwood 106: Child Bride by Al James
- Midwood 107: The Hunger And The Hate by Joan Ellis
- Midwood 108: Without Shame [aka 'The Awakening'] by Paul V. Russo
- Midwood 109: Torment by Don Holliday
- 1961 Midwood F110: The Unloved: An Original Novel, by Peggy Swenson
- Midwood 111: The Lover by Al James
- Midwood 112: A Girl Like That by John Plunkett
- Midwood 113: Mulatto by Joan Ellis
- Midwood 114: Corrupt Woman by Paul V. Russo
- Midwood 115: Married Mistress by Orrie Hitt
- Midwood 116: So Wild by Mike Skinner
- Midwood 117: For Value Received by Will Laurence
- Midwood 118: This Girl by Jason Hytes
- Midwood 119: That Other Hunger by Sloane Britain
- Midwood 120: Women In Prison by Mike Avallone
- 1961 Midwood 121: Of Shame and Joy: An Original Novel, by Sheldon Lord
- Midwood 122: House Of Sin by Dallas Mayo
- Midwood 123: Numbers Girl by Linda Michaels
- Midwood 124: Motel Hostess by Rick Richards
- Midwood 125: The Lowest Sins by Joe Castro
- Midwood 126: Pound Of Flesh by Jason Hytes
- Midwood 127: Weak And Wicked by Al James
- Midwood 128: Intimate by Martha Marsden
- Midwood 129: All My Lovers by Alan Marshall
- Midwood 130: Norma by George Glennon
- Midwood 131: Carla by Sheldon Lord
- Midwood 132: Stag Stripper by Mike Avallone
- Midwood 133: The Halfbreed by Al James
- Midwood 134: The Outcasts by March Hastings
- Midwood 135: The Little Black Book by Mike Avallone
- Midwood 136: The Snows Of Summer by Alice Brennan
- Midwood 137: Henry's Wife by Gordon Mitchell
- Midwood 138: Stag Model by James Harvey
- Midwood 139: In The Shadows by Joan Ellis
- Midwood 140: August Heat by Roger Allen
- Midwood 141: Love Like A Shadow by Kimberly Kemp
- Midwood 142: Woman Doctor by Sloane Britain
- Midwood 143: Con Girl by Unknown
- Midwood 144: I Know The Score by Ort Louis
- 1962 Midwood 145: Strange Delights, by Loren Beauchamp
- Midwood 146: Sinners In White by Mike Avallone
- Midwood 147: Man Hungry by Alan Marshall
- Midwood 148: Sin A La Carte by Loren Beauchamp
- Midwood 149: Apprentice Virgin [aka 'Backstage Love'] by Alan Marshall
- Midwood 150: Mail Order Sex by Orrie Hitt
- Midwood 151: Jill Harvey by Paul V. Russo
- Midwood 152: Office Tramp by Sidney Porcelain
- Midwood 153: Skin Deep by Walter Dyer
- Midwood 154: The Lesbian In Our Society by W.D. Sprague
- Midwood 155: Rita by Jason Hytes
- Midwood 156: The Flesh Is Willing by Dorcas Knight
- Midwood 157: The Strange Compulsion Of Laura M. by Joan Ellis
- Midwood 158: Scandal by Dallas Mayo
- Midwood 159: 21 Gay Street by Sheldon Lord
- Midwood 160: The Blonde by Peggy Swenson
- Midwood 161: Girls In Trouble by Linda Michaels
- Midwood 162: Perfume And Pain by Kemberly Kemp
- Midwood 163: The Drifter by March Hastings
- Midwood 164: Ripe by Rick Richards
- Midwood 165: Puta [aka 'Born To Be Bad'] by Sheldon Lord
- Midwood 166: What Girls Will Do [aka 'All the Girls Were Willing'] by Alan Marshall
- Midwood 167: Sex Before Six by Jason Hytes
- Midwood 168: Flight Hostess Rogers by Mike Avallone
- Midwood 169: Gay Scene [aka 'No Men Allowed'] by Joan Ellis
- 1962 Midwood 170: The Passer by Sam Merwin Jr.
- Midwood 171: The Undoing Of Jenny by Mike Skinner
- Midwood 172: Tender Torment by Randy Salem
- Midwood 173: Sex With A Twist by Joan Ellis
- Midwood 174: Seduction By Appointment by Rick Richards
- Midwood 175: Forever Amy by Amy Harris
- Midwood 176: The Doctor & The Dike [aka 'Secret Session'] by Jason Hytes
- Midwood 177: Ladder Of Flesh by Sloane Britain
- Midwood 178: A Man In Her House by William Johnston
- Midwood 179: Chico's Women by March Hastings
- Midwood 180: Prisoner Of My Past by Edie Fisher
- Midwood 181: Operation - Sex by Kimberly Kemp
- Midwood 182: Campus Jungle by Joan Ellis
- Midwood 183: A Twilight Affair by James Harvey
- Midwood 184: All The Way by Mike Avallone
- Midwood 185: Passionately Yours, Eve by Paul Gregory
- Midwood 186: TV Tramps by Walter Dyer
- Midwood 187: Abnormal by Rick Richards
- Midwood 188: Twice With Julie by Jason Hytes
- Midwood 189: Sex Kitten by Mike Avallone
- Midwood 190: The Craving by Dallas Mayo
- Midwood 191: Unnatural by Sloan Britton
- Midwood 192: The Sex Game by Mike Skinner
- Midwood 193: Lady Wrestler by James Harvey
- Midwood 194: Daughter Of Shame by Joan Ellis
- Midwood 195: One Way Ticket by Jason Hytes
- Midwood 196: The Soft Sin by Randy Salem
- Midwood 197: Come One-Come All by Jason Hytes
- Midwood 198: Voluptuous Voyage by Dallas Mayo
- Midwood 199: Thorn Of Evil by Max Collier
- Midwood 200: Easy by Peggy Swenson
- Midwood 201: Savage Surrender by March Hastings
- Midwood 202: The Platinum Trap by Mike Avallone
- Midwood 203: Birth Of A Tramp by Amy Harris
- Midwood 204: Web Of Flesh by Mal Chance
- Midwood 205: Never Love A Call Girl by Mike Avallone
- Midwood 206: Campus Sex Club by Loren Beauchamp
- Midwood 207: Over-Exposed by Jason Hytes
- Midwood 208: By Flesh Alone by March Hastings
- Midwood 209: Carrie Corrupted by Rock Logano
- Midwood 210: Intimate Nurse by Kimberly Kemp
- Midwood 211: Island Of Sin by Dallas Mayo
- Midwood 212: Touch Me Gently by Amy Harris
- Midwood 213: Sleep-In Maid [aka 'Cindy'] by Linda Michaels
- Midwood 214: Lap Of Luxury by Kimberly Kemp
- Midwood 215: Counter Girl by Amy Harris
- Midwood 216: Wait Your Turn by Jason Hytes
- Midwood 217: Appointment For Sin by Paul V. Russo
- Midwood 218: Gay Girl by Joan Ellis
- Midwood 219: The Sex Between by Randy Salem
- Midwood 220: Flight Into Sin by Mike Skinner
- Midwood 221: Yesterday's Virgin by Jason Hytes
- Midwood 222: Degraded Women by James Harvey
- Midwood 223: Pleasure Lodge by Peggy Swenson
- Midwood 224: Whip Of Desire by March Hastings
- Midwood 225: Unnatural Urge by Joe Black & Orrie Hitt
- 1962 Midwood 226: Wayward Widow by Loren Beauchamp — later reprinted as Midwood F226: Wayward Widow: Free Sample (1968)
- Midwood 227: Resort Secretary by Arnold English
- Midwood 228: The Girl Downstairs by Rock Anthony
- Midwood 229: This Is Elaine by Jason Hytes
- Midwood 230: Take Me by John B. Thompson
- Midwood 231: The Wild Week by Jason Hytes + Imitation Lovers by March Hastings
- Midwood 232: The Payoff by Max Collier
- Midwood 233: Immoral Lady by Russell Gage
- Midwood 234: Forbidden Sex by Joan Ellis
- Midwood 235: The Passionate Virgin by Mike Skinner
- Midwood 236: Wild Honey by Don Karl
- Midwood 237: Never Enough by Jason Hytes
- Midwood 238: The Hot Canary by Joan Ellis
- Midwood 239: Sudden Hunger by Paul Dodge
- Midwood 240: The Soft Way by March Hastings
- Midwood 241: The Pleasure And The Pain by Ort Louis
- Midwood 242: Don't Bet On Blondes by Walter Dyer
- Midwood 243: Illicit Interlude by Kimberly Kemp
- Midwood 244: By Her Body Betrayed by Rock Anthony
- Midwood 245: The Sex Plan by Philip Elder
- Midwood 246: Swing Low Sweet Sinner by Jason Hytes
- Midwood 247: Sea Nymph by Peggy Swenson
- Midwood 248: Horizontal Secretary [aka 'I'll Be Good - Tomorrow'] by Amy Harris
- Midwood 249: None But The Wicked by D.W. Craig
- Midwood 250: A Rage Within by March Hastings
- Midwood 251: Pagan by Paul V. Russo
- Midwood 252: Strange Breed by Aldo Lucchesi
- Midwood 253: Camera Club Model by James Harvey
- Midwood 254: Without Shame [aka 'The Awakening'] by Jason Hytes
- Midwood 255: Again And Again by March Hastings
- Midwood 256: A Bit Of Fluff by Kimberly Kemp
- Midwood 257: Once Too Often by Joan Ellis
- Midwood 258: Something Special by Richard Donalds
- 1963 Midwood 259: The Cruel Touch, by Alan Marshall
- Midwood 260: The Path Between by Jay Warren
- Midwood 261: One Step More by Jess Draper
- Midwood 262: Girl In The Middle by John Burton Thompson
- Midwood 263: The Mark Of A Man by Max Collier
- Midwood 264: Erica by James Harvey
- Midwood 265: All Of Me by Amy Harris
- Midwood 266: Restless by Greg Hamilton
- Midwood 267: Everybody Welcome [aka 'The Girl Next Door'] by Dallas Mayo
- Midwood 268: The Unashamed by March Hastings
- Midwood 269: The Teaser by Jason Hytes
- Midwood 270: Sign Here For Sin by Richard Donalds
- Midwood 271: Her Private Hell by March Hastings
- Midwood 272: Rusty by Jess Draper
- Midwood 273: Any Man Will Do by Greg Hamilton
- 1963 Midwood F274: Pajama Party, by Peggy Swenson
- Midwood 275: Irma La Douce by Wilder Billy & I.A.L. Diamond
- Midwood 276: Sin On Wheels by Loren Beauchamp
- Midwood 277: Perfumed by Jason Hytes + Pampered by Kimberly Kemp
- Midwood 278: Fringe Benefits by Rock Anthony
- Midwood 279: Hold Me Tight by Joan Ellis
- Midwood 280: Take Care Of Me by John Turner
- Midwood 281: Say When by Max Collier
- Midwood 282: Party Girls by Paul V. Russo
- Midwood 283: Honeysuckle by Randy Salem
- Midwood 284: Meet Marilyn by Sloane Britain
- Midwood 285: Whatever She Wanted by Jess Draper
- Midwood 286: One Of The Girls by Richard Mezatesta
- Midwood 287: Soft In The Shadows by John Turner
- Midwood 288: Night After Night by Will Saxon
- Midwood 289: Nine To Five by Joseph Commings
- Midwood 290: The Intruder by Judd Powell
- Midwood 291: Lesbianism Around The World by R. Leighton Hasselrodt
- Midwood 292: Nurse Carolyn [aka 'Maternity Ward'] by Loren Beauchamp
- Midwood 293: Too Young To Marry by Joan Ellis
- Midwood 294: Above And Beyond by Richard Mullins
- Midwood 295: The Spy by Paul Thomas
- Midwood 296: The Heat Of Day by March Hastings
- Midwood 297: The Captive by John Turner
- Midwood 298: Made To Order by Greg Hamilton
- Midwood 299: Nothing To Lose by Kimberly Kemp
- Midwood 300: Shadow Dance by Barbara Brooks + After Hours by Robbie McAndrews
- Midwood 301: Devil's Workshop by Stuart James
- Midwood 302: A Time Of Torment by Jason Hytes
- Midwood 303: Sure Thing by Max Collier
- Midwood 304: Shameless by John B. Thompson
- Midwood 305: The Come On by Vin Fields
- Midwood 306: Man Handled by E.L. Scobie
- Midwood 307: No Way Back by Russell Trainer
- Midwood 308: Carole Came Back by John Turner
- Midwood 309: With Eyes Wide Open by Rock Anthony
- Midwood 310: The Delicate Vice by Sloan Britton
- 1963 Midwood F311: Unlike Others, by Valerie Taylor
- Midwood 312: Tear Gas And Hungry Dogs by William Sloan
- Midwood 313: Man Trap by Brad Curtis
- Midwood 314: Monica by Greg Hamilton
- Midwood 315: When Lights Are Low by Dallas Mayo
- Midwood 316: The French Way by John Lamoureux
- Midwood 317: Not Since Eve by Richard Donalds
- Midwood 318: Stronger Than Love by Jess Draper
- Midwood 319: Diane by Max Collier
- Midwood 320: Insatiable by Sloane Britain
- Midwood 321: Harlot In Heels by Greg Hamilton + Lady Love by Jason Hytes
- Midwood 322: No Sense Of Shame by Dan Brennan
- Midwood 323: Just The Two Of Us by Barbara Brooks by William Coons
- Midwood 324: So Eager To Please by Greg Hamilton
- Midwood 325: The Sinners by John Turner
- Midwood 326: The Honeymoon Habit by Grant Corgan
- Midwood 327: Spring Fever by Ludwell Hughes
- Midwood 328: Image Of Evil by Paul V. Russo
- Midwood 329: Return To Lesbos by Valerie Taylor
- Midwood 330: Two Must Die by Henry Kane
- Midwood 331: Different by Kimberly Kemp
- Midwood 332: Day In, Day Out by Joan Ellis
- Midwood 333: Teacher's Pet by Mark Clements
- Midwood 334: The Vice Dolls by John Stark
- Midwood 335: Anatomy Of A Mistress by Brad Curtis
- Midwood 336: Nude In A Red Chair by Amanda Moore
- Midwood 337: Have Heels, Will Travel by Andrew Wynne
- Midwood 338: Immoral by Jason Hytes + Forbidden by Kimberly Kemp
- Midwood 339: Old Enough by David Martell
- 1963 Midwood F340: Nikki, by Don Rico
- Midwood 341: Portrait In Flesh by Greg Hamilton
- Midwood 342: The Baby-Sitter by Vin Fields
- Midwood 343: Girl's Dormitory by Joan Ellis
- Midwood 344: Switch Partners by Shelia Faye
- Midwood 345: Marriage On The Rocks by John Nemec
- 1963 Midwood F346: A World Without Men, by Valerie Taylor
- Midwood 347: Friends & Lovers by Oscar Pinkus
- Midwood 348: The Pagan Empress by Kevin Matthews
- Midwood 349: High School Hellion by Joan Ellis + Campus Cat Pack by Barbara Brooks
- Midwood 350: The Spice Of Life by Grant Corgan
- Midwood 351: Another Kind Of Love [aka 'Raped Virgin'] by Greg Hamilton
- Midwood 352: A World All Their Own by Kimberly Kemp
- Midwood 353: Never Say No by J.L. Bouma
- Midwood 354: Love Or Lust by Mark Clements
- Midwood 355: Anything Under The Sun by Michael Spaulding
- Midwood 356: For Services Rendered by Brad Curtis
- Midwood 357: Where There's Smoke by Michael Burgess
- Midwood 358: Kitten by Dallas Mayo
- Midwood 359: Duet by Laura Du Champ
- Midwood 360: After Class by Joan Ellis
- Midwood 361: Love Starved by Russell Trainer
- Midwood 362: Woman On Fire by Brian O'Bannon
- Midwood 363: So Strange A Love by Danni Sherwood
- Midwood 364: Early To Bed by Mark Clements
- Midwood 365: The Yes Girl by Amanda Moore
- Midwood 366: Tall, Blonde And Evil by Greg Hamilton
- Midwood 367: His For The Taking by Jess Draper
- Midwood 368: One Last Fling by Jason Hytes
- Midwood 369:
- Midwood 370: Cry Into The Wind by Eugenie Gaffney
- Midwood 371: Pretty Puppet by Dallas Mayo
- Midwood 372: That Kind Of Wife by Greg Hamilton
- Midwood 373: We Two by Ann Brady Clay
- Midwood 374: Impatient by David Lawrence
- Midwood 375: The Street Walker by Jason Hytes
- Midwood 376: Only In Secret by D.W. Craig
- Midwood 377: The Teenage Trap by R.C. Gold
- Midwood 378: His Daughter's Friend by Russell Trainer
- Midwood 379: Corrupt Woman by Paul V. Russo
- Midwood 380: Love Toy by Frank G. Harris
- Midwood 381: The House Guest by Kimberly Kemp
- Midwood 382: Afternoons At Three by Greg Hamilton
- Midwood 383: A Lesson In Love by Marjorie Price
- Midwood 384: Swing Shift by Grant Corgan
- Midwood 385: Man Tamer by Brad Curtis
- Midwood 386: The Third Street by Joan Ellis
- Midwood 387: Home Before Six by Alix York
- Midwood 388: Playgirl by Michael Burgess
- Midwood 389: Dance Of Desire by Paul V. Russo
- Midwood 390: Remember Me? by Eugenie Gaffney
- Midwood 391: Goodbye, Darling by Laura Duchamp
- Midwood 392: Chains Of Silk by John Balmer
- Midwood 393: The Adulteress by James Harvey
- Midwood 394: The Unloved by Peggy Swenson

=== Tower Series 394-339 ===
- Midwood 34-395: The Dangerous Age by Joan Ellis + Bad By Choice by Jason Hytes
- Midwood 32-396: Talk Of The Town by Joan Ellis
- Midwood 32-397: Joy by David Lawrence
- Midwood 32-398: Encore by Laura Duchamp
- Midwood 32-399: Good Time Girl by Alix York
- Midwood 32-400: Too Late For Tears by D.W. Craig
- Midwood 32-401: Divorcee by Joan Vincent
- Midwood 32-402: Warm And Willing by Jill Emerson
- Midwood 32-403: Male Call by Max Collier
- Midwood 32-404: Overtime Affair by Jason Hytes
- Midwood 42-405: Love A La Carte by George St. George
- Midwood 42-406: The Organization by Ovid Demaris
- Midwood 42-407: Before I Die by Lionel White
- Midwood 42-408: Cry Into The Wind by Eugine Gaffney
- Midwood 34-409: Trick Or Treat by Marjorie Price + Split Level Sin by Jason Hytes
- Midwood 32-410: Hellcat by Barbara Brooks
- Midwood 32-411: A Labor Of Love by Kimberly Kemp
- Midwood 32-412: Hold That Pose by Sheila Faye
- Midwood 32-413: Thank You, Call Again by Laura Duchamp
- Midwood 32-414: The Roommates by Mark Clements
- Midwood 32-415: One After Another by Vin Fields
- Midwood 32-416: His To Command by Max Collier
- Midwood 32-417: Campus Kittens by Joan Ellis
- Midwood 32-418: Silky by Dallas Mayo
- Midwood 32-419: The Other Extreme by Laura Duchamp
- Midwood 32-420: Just This Once by Michael Burgess
- Midwood 32-421: The Easy Way by Dallas Mayo
- Midwood 32-422: Pleasure Island by Alix York
- Midwood 32-423: Follow The Leader by Greg Hamilton
- Midwood 32-424: Gang Girl by Joan Ellis
- Midwood 32-425: Private Property by Brad Curtis
- Midwood 32-426: Party Time by Kimberly Kemp
- 1964 Midwood 32-427: Journey To Fulfillment by Valerie Taylor
- Midwood 32-428: Sex Before Six by Jason Hytes
- Midwood 44-429: The Hard Sell by Lee Costigan
- Midwood 43-430: Catherine The Great by Kevin Mathews
- Midwood 42-431: The Killing (movie tie-in title of the novel Clean Break) by Lionel White
- Midwood 42-432: Trail's End by John S. Daniels
- Midwood 32-433: The Time And Place by Laura Duchamp
- Midwood 32-434: Holiday Weekend by Mark Clements
- Midwood 32-435: Into The Fire by Paul V. Russo
- Midwood 32-436: Three Of A Kind by Joan Ellis
- Midwood 32-437: Miss Dream Girl by Jay Hart
- Midwood 32-438: Woman Aflame by Connie Nelson
- Midwood 32-439: Love Thief by Michael Burgess
- Midwood 32-440: For Want Of Love by Amanda Moore
- Midwood 32-441: Night Shift by Brad Curtis
- Midwood 32-442: The Drifter by March Hastings
- Midwood 43-443: A Summer In Spain by Richard Lortz
- Midwood 43-444: Hemingway's Paris by Morrill Cody
- Midwood 43-445: He Ran All the Way by Sam Ross
- Midwood 42-446: Apache Landing by Robert J. Hogan
- Midwood 34-447: And When She Was Bad by Barbra Brooks + Strangers For Lovers by Jay Hart
- Midwood 32-448: Coming Out Party by Kimberly Kemp
- Midwood 32-449: Little Girl Lost by Greg Hamilton
- Midwood 32-450: Daytime In Suburbia by Susannah West
- Midwood 32-451: A Shameless Need by Barbara Brooks
- Midwood 32-452: Out Of Control by Mark Clements
- Midwood 32-453: Tourist Trap by Will Newbury
- Midwood 32-454: Master Pieces by Howard Kandel & Don Satram
- Midwood 32-455: The Love Pirate by Alix York
- Midwood 32-456: No Men Allowed [aka 'Gay Scene'] by Joan Ellis
- Midwood 34-457: Executive Sweet by Joan Ellis + The Soft Sell by Connie Nelson
- Midwood 43-458: Why Are You Single? by Hilda Holland
- Midwood 43-459: Unclouded Summer by Alec Waugh
- Midwood 43-460: Can A Mermaid Kill? by Thomas B. Dewey
- Midwood 43-461: Time To Come by August Derleth
- Midwood 34-462: Forbidden Interlude by Toni Stevens + Just You, Just Me by Barbara Brooks
- Midwood 32-463: Sexual Behavior Of The American Housewife by W.D. Sprague
- Midwood 32-464: Open House by Joan Ellis
- Midwood 32-465: Pagan Summer by Dallas Mayo
- Midwood 32-466: Wayward Wife by Mark Clements
- Midwood 32-467: Penthouse Party by Gerald Kramer
- Midwood 32-468: The Highest Bidder by Vin Fields
- Midwood 32-469: Never Too Young by D.W. Craig
- Midwood 32-470: Punish Lessons by Amanda Moore
- Midwood 32-471: One For The Road by Jason Hytes
- Midwood 43-472: The Bird's Nest by Shirley Jackson
- Midwood 43-473: The Buccaneers by P.K. Kemp & Christopher Lloyd
- Midwood 42-474: Objsect Of Jealousy by Arthur Rutledge
- Midwood 43-475: Helen Of Troy by Kevin Mathews
- Midwood 34-476: Two Timer by Connie Nelson + The Mate Exchange by Frank Harris
- Midwood 34-477: Small Town Sinner by Merry Woods + Thrill Hungry by Brian O'Bannon
- Midwood 32-478: The Swap Set by Max Collier
- Midwood 32-479: Private Party [aka 'The Waitress'] by Kimberly Kemp
- Midwood 32-480: Trouble Maker by Russell Trainer
- Midwood 32-481: Room Service by Laura Duchamp
- Midwood 32-482: Ask Me No Questions by Carter McCord
- Midwood 32-483: Overnight Guest by Ludwell Hughes
- Midwood 32-484: Finders Keepers by Sloan Britain
- Midwood 32-485: Jailbait by Jason Hytes
- Midwood 43-486: The Billboard Madonna by Elleston Trevor
- Midwood 42-487: Teen-Ager's Guide To Living by Judson T. Landis
- Midwood 43-488: The Tired Spy by David Stone
- Midwood 42-489: The Hunted by John S. Daniels
- Midwood 34-490: Problem Child by Vin Fields + The Switch by Joan Ellis
- Midwood 34-491: The Wrong Kind by Gerald Kramer + Never Ask Why by Amanda Moore
- Midwood 32-492: Handy Man by Mark Clements
- Midwood 32-493: Christine by John Turner
- Midwood 32-494: The Beauty Game by Emory Paine
- Midwood 32-495: Down And Out by Les Masters
- Midwood 32-496: The Cool Coeds by Joan Ellis
- Midwood 32-497: The Sleek And Sensual by Max Collier
- Midwood 32-498: The Nymphomaniac by Jeffery Williams
- Midwood 32-499: Satan In Silk by Paul V. Russo
- Midwood 44-500: The Wandering Husband by Hyman Spotnitz & Lucy Freeman
- Midwood 42-501: History Was Made In Bed by Paul Croville
- Midwood 42-502: Five Day Nightmare by Fredric Brown
- Midwood 43-503: The Mind Cage by A.E. Van Vogt
- Midwood 34-504: Bedtime Story by Laura Duchamp + The Softest Sin by Ludwell Hughes
- Midwood 34-505: The Voluptuary by Connie Nelson + One For All by Merry Woods
- Midwood 32-506: Kid Sister by Mark Clements
- Midwood 32-507: Exotic Escapade by Paul V. Russo
- Midwood 32-508: Queen Bee by Will Newbury
- Midwood 32-509: Pretty Please by Joan Ellis
- Midwood 32-510: Obsession by Emory Paine
- Midwood 32-511: Mainly For Wives by Robert Chartham
- Midwood 32-512: The Lady Awaits by Greg Hamilton
- Midwood 32-513: One Night Stand [aka 'Scandal'] by Dallas Mayo
- Midwood 43-514: The Innocents by Edward D. Radin
- Midwood 43-515: Gemini by Theodora Keogh
- Midwood 43-516: The Tight Corner by Sam Ross
- Midwood 43-517: Affair At Quala by Thomas Helmore
- Midwood 34-518: On Call by Connie Nelson + The Pick-Up by Brad Curtis
- Midwood 34-519: None The Wiser by Clement Haney + Change Partners by Grant Corgan
- Midwood 32-520: Sooner Or Later by Joan Ellis
- Midwood 32-521: The Rebel by Emory Paine
- Midwood 32-522: Winner Take All by Mark Clements
- Midwood 32-523: Alone At Last by Paul V. Russo
- Midwood 32-524: The Moonlighters by Gil Herbert
- Midwood 32-525: Taboo by Barbara Brooks
- Midwood 32-526: Anything Goes by Marjorie Price
- Midwood 32-527: Secret Session [aka 'The Doctor & The Dike'] by Jason Hytes
- Midwood 43-528: Once Upon A Friday by Phillips Moore
- Midwood 43-529: Sex And So What by Virginia Sweet Purdom
- Midwood 43-530: Flight Into Terror by Lionel White
- Midwood 43-531: Dragon's Island by Jack Williams
- Midwood 34-532: Coming Of Age by Gerald Kramer + Handle With Care by Barbara Brooks
- Midwood 34-533: Runaway by Connie Nelson + Now Or Never by Clement Haney
- Midwood 32-534: The Boss's Daughter by Mark Clements
- Midwood 32-535: Temporary Secretary by Joan Ellis
- Midwood 32-536: The Love Goddess by Brad Curtis
- Midwood 32-537: Mock Marriage by Kenneth Shaw
- Midwood 32-538: Model Mistress by Laura Duchamp
- Midwood 32-539: Honey Child by Greg Hamilton
- Midwood 32-540: The Unfaithful Wife by Jeffery Williams
- Midwood 32-541: Twice With Julie by Jason Hytes
- Midwood 44-542: The Deep Six by Martin Dibner
- Midwood 43-543: Rebels In The Streets by Kitty Hanson
- Midwood 43-544: A Fire In His Hand by Michael Grieg
- Midwood 43-545: Escapade by Jerry Weil
- Midwood 34-546: Wandering Wives by Simon Lansing + Suburban Affair by Connie Nelson
- Midwood 34-547: Only In Shadows by Merry Woods + The Velvet Trap by Toni Stevens
- Midwood 34-548: The Swinger by Barbara Brooks + Not So Nice by Clement Haney
- Midwood 32-549: Wild And Wicked by Laura Duchamp
- Midwood 32-550: Enough Of Sorrow by Jill Emerson
- Midwood 32-551: Queen Of Hearts by Carter McCord
- Midwood 32-552: Surprise Party by Ludwell Hughes
- Midwood 32-553: Late At Night by Merry Woods
- Midwood 32-554: Campus Jungle by Joan Ellis
- Midwood 32-555: Over-Exposed by Jason Hytes
- Midwood 44-556: Bogey - The Man, The Actor, The Legend by Jonah Ruddy & Jonathan Hill
- Midwood 43-557: The Major by David Hughes
- Midwood 42-558: More Bitter Than Death by Kate Wilhelm
- Midwood 42-559: Hanging Fever by Robert J. Hogan
- Midwood 34-560: Force Of Habit by Barbra Brooks + A Twilight Sin by Rhoda Peterson
- Midwood 34-561: Lady Of Leisure by Connie Nelson + Never Let Me Go by Toni Stevens
- Midwood 34-562: Not So Innocent by William Moore + Sugar And Spice by Joan Ellis
- Midwood 32-563: Boss Lady by Ursula Grant
- Midwood 32-564: The Strange One by Greg Hamilton
- Midwood 32-565: Three Women by Harry Gibbs
- Midwood 32-566: Don't Tell Anyone by Joan Ellis
- Midwood 32-567: Strictly Business by Eunice Brandon
- Midwood 32-568: Man Crazy by Max Collier
- Midwood 32-569: Rich And Reckless by Toni Stevens
- Midwood 43-570: One More Time by Casey Scott
- Midwood 43-571: The Project by Andrew Sinclair
- Midwood 43-572: The Cave Of The Chinese Skeletons by Jack Seward
- Midwood 42-573: Shadow At Dunster Hall by Eugenia Desmond
- Midwood 42-574: Try To Forget by Arlene Corliss
- Midwood 34-575: Sorority Sisters by Connie Nelson + Campus Affair by Amanda Moore
- Midwood 34-576: Girl About Town by Ursula Grant + Do Unto Others by Toni Stevens
- Midwood 34-577: Only After Dark by Peter Conrad + Accent On Passion by William Moore
- Midwood 32-578: All Together Now by Dallas Mayo
- Midwood 32-579: Country Girl by Joan Ellis
- Midwood 32-580: The Golden Greed by Brad Curtis
- Midwood 34-581: Angel Face by Barbara Brooks + House Pet by John Balmer
- Midwood 34-582: Sin-Suburban Style by Grant Corgan + The Games Wives Play by Rhoda Peterson
- Midwood 34-583: Easy Come, Easy Go by Connie Nelson + From Bed To Worse by Joseph Tell
- Midwood 32-584: The Last Resort [aka 'Secret Cravings'] by Kimberly Kemp
- Midwood 32-585: Back Seat Bunny by Greg Hamilton
- Midwood 32-586: Sweet Revenge by Merry Woods
- Midwood 32-587: Heat Spell by William Moore
- Midwood 32-588: Faculty Wife by Joan-Ellis
- Midwood 32-589: The Body Beautiful by Carl DeMarco
- Midwood 44-590: Venus In Furs - The Black Czarina [aka 'The Long-Suppressed Erotic Tales'] by Leopold von Sacher-Masoch
- Midwood 43-591: The River by Jeff Sutton
- Midwood 43-592: Lost Island by Graham McInnis
- Midwood 42-593: Mistress Of Farrondale by Dorethea Nile
- Midwood 42-594: Don't Ever Leave Me by Lois Kleihauer
- Midwood 34-595: Party, Party by C.P. West + Dutch Treat by Jeffrey Williams
- Midwood 34-596: Wanton Widow by Connie Nelson + Two Times Two by Barbara Brooks
- Midwood 34-597: Pretty Playmate by Will Newbury + Every So Often by Gus Stevens
- Midwood 32-598: Live And Let Live by Brad Curtis
- Midwood 32-599: Free And Easy by Greg Hamilton
- Midwood 32-600: Switch Time by Merry Woods
- Midwood 32-601: Come And Be My Slave by Gerald Kramer
- Midwood 32-602: No Last Names by Joan Ellis
- Midwood 32-603: So Dark A Desire by William Moore
- Midwood 32-604: Give And Take by Cynthia Sydney
- Midwood 44-605: The Mariage Bed by Albert Ellis & Robert Harper
- Midwood 42-606: The Mists Of Mourning by Suzanne Somers
- Midwood 42-607: Spellbound by Claire Vincent
- Midwood 42-608: Consequences Of Love by Alice Brennan
- Midwood 34-609: Season Of Sin by Charles Castleman + Daytime Lovers by Connie Nelson
- Midwood 34-610: Naughty But Nice by Joan Ellis + From Me To You by John Hayes
- Midwood 34-611: Lost And Found by Cynthia Sydney + The Go-Go Girls by Leslie Roote
- Midwood 34-612: Perfumed by Jason Hytes + The Wild Week by Jason Hytes
- Midwood 32-613: Man Hunt by Mark Clements
- Midwood 32-614: Girl On The Run by Jean Holbrook
- Midwood 32-615: Sweet But Sinful by Emory Paine
- Midwood 32-616: The Speed Set by S.R. Fontaine
- Midwood 32-617: Hide And Seek by Norman A. King
- Midwood 32-618: Snow Bunnies by Joan Ellis
- Midwood 43-619: The Summer Ghosts by Alexis Lykiard
- Midwood 43-620: Jadoo by Joel Keel
- Midwood 42-621: The Doomsday Planet by Harl Vincent
- Midwood 42-622: Deadline by Dan J. Stevens
- Midwood 34-623: Hip Chick by Joan Ellis + Darers Go First by Randy Baker
- Midwood 34-624: Bold And Brazen by Leslie Roote + Private Secretary by Merry Woods
- Midwood 34-625: Search For Sin by Charles Castleman + Night Shift Nurse by Sidney Wilson
- Midwood 34-626: Honky-Tonk Girl by Jean Holbrook + The Boiling Point by Connie Nelson
- Midwood 32-627: Too Young, Too Wild by Brad Curtis
- Midwood 32-628: Norma Born For Trouble by George Glennon
- Midwood 32-629: The Face Of Evil by Robert Bruce
- Midwood 32-630: The Impatient Age by Carter McCord
- Midwood 32-631: The Discontented by Max Collier
- Midwood 32-632: Label Her Shameless by John B. Thompson
- Midwood 34-633: High School Hellion by Joan Ellis + The Dangerous Age by Gerald Kramer
- Midwood 34-634: All About A Tease by Terry Shaffer + Babe In The Woods by J.C. Comstock
- Midwood 34-635: Goodbye Innocence by Norman A. King + Big City Campus by Linda Micheals
- Midwood 34-636: Midnight Mistress by John Hayes + Private Pleasures by Toni Stevens
- Midwood 34-637: Call Me Kitten by Cory Mallord + Fair Exchange by Leslie Roote
- Midwood 33-638: Never The Same Again by Merry Woods
- Midwood 33-639: The Girl Next Door [aka 'Everybody Welcome'] by Roy Peterson
- Midwood 33-640: The Love Business by Cynthia Sydney
- Midwood 33-641: Sure Thing by Max Collier
- Midwood 33-642: The Pleasure Game by Brad Curtis
- Midwood 43-643: Three Beds In Manhattan by Simenon
- Midwood 42-644: The Defector by Paul Thomas
- Midwood 42-645: Terror At Deepcliff by Dorethea Nile
- Midwood 42-646: Renegade Guns by Robert J. Hogan
- Midwood 34-647: One Long Weekend by Jim Lansing + Free For All by Jean Holbrook
- Midwood 34-648: Nymph In Nylons by Amanda Moore + A Willing Worker by Leslie Roote
- Midwood 34-649: One Too Many by John Balmer + Stay Until Morning by Cynthia Sydney
- Midwood 34-650: Teenage Tornado by Joan Ellis + Apprentice Sinner by Connie Nelson
- Midwood 34-651: Young And Restless by Terry Shaffer + Three Easy Lessons by Gus Stevens
- Midwood 33-652: Paint Her Scarlet by Ursula Grant
- Midwood 33-653: So Cold So Cruel by Norman A. King
- Midwood 33-654: Prize Pupil by Amy Harris
- Midwood 32-655: No Sense Of Shame by Daniel Brennan
- Midwood 33-656: The Honeymoon Habit by Grant Corgan
- Midwood 43-657: The Breaking Point by Richard Mullins
- Midwood 42-658: The Evil Men Do by Dorothea Nile
- Midwood 43-659: The Subject Of Harry Egypt by Daniel Broun
- Midwood 42-660: Dynamo, Man Of High Camp by Unknown
- Midwood 34-661: Campus Rebel by Joan Ellis + Quick Change by Mike Henry
- Midwood 34-662: For Want Of Love by Terry Shaffer + Woman In Torment by Merry Woods
- Midwood 34-663: Bundle Of Joy by Norman A. King + Girls On The Loose by Linda Michaels
- Midwood 34-664: Get-Acquainted Party by Toni Stevens + The Higher The Price by Cynthia Sydney
- Midwood 34-665: First Came Kathy by Max Collier
- Midwood 34-666: No Price Too High by Russell Gage
- Midwood 33-667: All In The Game by R.C. Gold
- Midwood 33-668: Town Tease by Greg Hamilton
- Midwood 33-669: So Eager To Please by Greg Hamilton
- Midwood 33-670: A Female Female by Brad Curtis
- Midwood 42-671: There Oughta Be A Law by Harry Shorten
- Midwood 42-672: NoMan, The Invisible THUNDER Agent by Unknown
- Midwood 42-673: The Awakening [aka 'Without Shame'] by Jason Hytes
- Midwood 42-674: Menthor, The T.H.U.N.D.E.R. Agent with The Super Helmet by Unknown
- Midwood 42-675:
- Midwood 44-676: The High Cost Of Living by Lewis J. Barker
- Midwood 34-677: Doll Baby by Jack Townsend +Beach Party by Connie Nelson
- Midwood 34-678: Summer Set by Gil Herbert + Available by Toni Stevens
- Midwood 34-679: Girl In The Middle by John Burton Thompson
- Midwood 34-680: I'll Be Good - Tomorrow [aka 'Horizontal Secretary'] by Amy Harris
- Midwood 34-681: Already Taken by Joan Ellis + First Try by Dorothy Worden
- Midwood 33-682: Campus Queen by Ursula Grant
- Midwood 33-683: Test Of Love by Max Collier
- Midwood 33-684: Reckless Wife by Connie Nelson
- Midwood 33-685: Another Man's Wife by John Turner
- Midwood 33-686: Old Enough by David Martell
- Midwood 42-687: The Terrific Trio by Unknown
- Midwood 44-688: The Frightened Women by N.J. Gelinas
- Midwood 43-689: The Courtesan by Kevin Mathews
- Midwood 43-690: Bucks County Report by Irwin Wallach
- Midwood 42-691: Sex And The Single Bat by Bat Babe & Rosie
- Midwood 43-692: Fatal Mistake by Ovid Demaris
- Midwood ??-693:
- Midwood 34-694: Brandy Jones by John B. Thompson
- Midwood 34-695: Campus Party by Joan Ellis + Tempting Teen by J.C, Comstock
- Midwood 34-696: The Other Woman by Grant Corgan + The Quiet Type by Mike Henry
- Midwood 34-697: Alone Too Long by Norman Anderson King + Rich Man's Wife by Cynthis Sydney
- Midwood 34-698: Pleasant Company by Kimberly Kemp
- Midwood 33-699: Night Spot by Jackson Harmon
- Midwood 33-700: Why Play Games by Gus Stevens
- Midwood 33-701: The Come On by Vin Fields
- Midwood 33-702: One Of The Girls by Richard Mezatesta
- Midwood 33-703: The Girl Downstairs by Rock Anthony
- Midwood 44-704: One Of Our Bombers Is Missing by Dan Brennan
- Midwood 43-705: The Gentle Kiss Of Death by Ann Barron
- Midwood 43-706: Who, Me Fly? by Robert Scharff
- Midwood 43-707: Sexual Gratification In Marriage by Jeffery Williams
- Midwood 34-708: Kitty Breaks Loose by Jackson Harmon
- Midwood 34-709: Co-Ed With Class by Dirk Malloy + Out For Kicks by Connie Nelson
- Midwood 34-710: These Warm Nights by John Balmer + All The Trimmings by Steve Gregory
- Midwood 34-711: The Sunday Lovers by Laura Duchamp + Marriage On The Side by Mike Henry
- Midwood 34-712: Fiery Redhead by Joe Weiss
- Midwood 33-713: Protect My Reputation by J.C. Comstock
- Midwood 33-714: Mercedes by Carl Demarco
- Midwood 33-715: Next Stop, Shame by Bart Matty
- Midwood 33-716: Thrill Crazy by Brad Curtis
- Midwood 33-717: A Taste Of Longing by aka 'Web Of Flesh'] by Mal Chance
- Midwood 46-718: Brand Of Hate by Frank Castle
- Midwood 42-719: Outpost Of Eternity by Helen Arvonen
- Midwood 44-720: Blood In The Sky by Dan Brennan
- Midwood 44-721: Daughter, Oh My Daughter by Milfred Mesurac Jeffrey
- Midwood 34-722: Teen-Age Hideaway by Joan Ellis + Running Wild by Tom Roberts
- Midwood 34-723: Wives Play Too by Dirk Malloy + New Woman Around by Lucas J. Cassel
- Midwood 34-724: After Hours by Chad Denby + Working Girl by Dana Pitman
- Midwood 34-725: Test In Temptation by Laura Duchamp + Cool And Collected by Blake Randall
- Midwood 34-726: Call Me Anytime by Mel Howard
- Midwood 34-727: Everybody Welcome [aka 'The Girl Next Door'] by Dallas Mayo
- Midwood 33-728: A Woman's Touch by Vin Fields
- Midwood 33-729: Jody by Brad Curtis
- Midwood 33-730: On Company Time by Daniel A. Morton
- Midwood 33-731: The Fourth Woman by John B. Thompson
- Midwood 42-732: Bitter Legacy by Ruth MacLeod
- Midwood 46-733: The Oath by Riley Ryan
- Midwood 43-734: The Psycho by Phillips Moore
- Midwood 43-735: Operation - Sky Drop by Dan Brennan
- Midwood 34-736: Break The Rules by Joan Ellis + Campus Affair by Mike Henry
- Midwood 34-737: Draw The Blinds by Kimberly Kemp + Surprise, Surprise by Frank Graham
- Midwood 34-738: A Passion For Wealth by Bruce Elliot + Too Rich To Care by Laura Duchamp
- Midwood 34-739: Southern Belle by J.C. Comstock + Teen-Age Mischief by Terry Shaffer
- Midwood 34-740: Suburban Fling by Jim Conroy + Sophisticated Party by Chad Denby
- Midwood 33-741: The Sexually Maladjusted Female by A. Joseph Burstein
- Midwood 32-742: Apartment Party by Gerald Kramer
- Midwood 33-743: Teen Model by Lucas J. Cassell
- Midwood 33-744: Pictures Of Marcia by Robert Bruce
- Midwood 33-745: Warm Summer's Shame by Ken Blackwell
- Midwood 44-746: If This Be Sexual Heresy by Albert Ellis
- Midwood 43-747: Jacqueminot by Kathleen Rich
- Midwood 43-748: Cathy's Way by Dan Brennan
- Midwood 43-749: The Captive by John Turner
- Midwood 33-750: Barbie by March Hastings
- Midwood 33-751: Office Favorite by Dirk Malloy
- Midwood 33-752: Earning Her Keep by J.C. Comstock
- Midwood 33-753: Teen Temptress by R.C. Gold
- Midwood 34-754: Hotel Hostess by Brad Curtis
- Midwood 34-755: For Love Or Money by Chynthia Sydney + Hard To Handle by Dana Pitman
- Midwood 34-756: That Blond Girl by Mike Henry + Campus Knockout by Frank Graham
- Midwood 34-757: A Weakness For Men by Laura Duchamp + Dark Rooms, Dark Nights by Donna May
- Midwood 34-758: One Hot Afternoon by John Hayes + AWOL Wife by Jackson Harmon
- Midwood 34-759: Teen-Age Fling by Joan Ellis + Something New by Barbra Dean
- Midwood 42-760: Fleur Macabre by Isabel Stewart Way
- Midwood 43-761: Child Of Communism by Edie Pfeiffer
- Midwood 43-762: Beyond Belief by Stefan Elg
- Midwood 43-763: Code Name - Rubble by Paul Thomas
- Midwood 46-764: Guns Up by Ernest Haycox
- Midwood 34-765: Tormented by John Burton Thompson
- Midwood 33-766: Fever by Jim Conroy
- Midwood 33-767: Camera Action by Dirk Malloy
- Midwood 33-768: Suzanne by Carl Demarco
- Midwood 33-769: Professional Favors by Jackson Harmon
- Midwood 34-770: Swinging Secretary by Mike Henry + Office Party by Connie Nelson
- Midwood 34-771: Part-Time Wife by Art Rawley + Play For Keeps by Tom Roberts
- Midwood 34-772: The Added Attraction by Jack Stanton + Caught In The Act by Eric Hamland
- Midwood 34-773: High School Rebel by Joan Ellis + Coolest Girl by Gerald Kramer
- Midwood 34-774: Head Over Heels by Frank Graham + Teen With Talent by J.C. Comstock
- Midwood 44-775: The Bird's Nest by Shirley Jackson
- Midwood 43-776: The Mind Cage by A.E. Van Vogt
- Midwood 46-777: Wipe Out The Brierlys [aka 'Brand Fires On The Ridge!'] by Ernest Haycox
- Midwood 42-778: Murder Las Vegas Style by W.T. Ballard
- Midwood 43-779: A Rage Within by March Hastings
- Midwood 33-780: This Is Elaine by Jason Hytes
- Midwood 34-781: Fascination by Laura Deschamp + Topless by Mark Reading
- Midwood 34-782: Seductress by John Balmer + Sudden Affair by Lawrence Black
- Midwood 34-783: Apartment To Share by Joan Ellis + Change Of Pace by Eric Hamland
- Midwood 34-784: French Leave by Norman Anderson King + Night Games by Dana Pitman
- Midwood 33-785: The Nylon Trap by Lin Evans
- Midwood 33-786: Night School by Jeremy August
- Midwood 33-787: Secrets Of Success by Lucas J. Cassel
- Midwood 33-788: Soft Shoulders by Paul V. Russo
- Midwood 33-789: Career Girl by Joe Weiss
- Midwood 42-790: The Lucifer Mask by Kathleen Rich
- Midwood 46-791: Guns Of Fury by Ernest Haycox
- Midwood 42-792: Why Are They Watching Us? by Alex Louis Erskine
- Midwood 43-793: A Time Of Torment by Jason Hytes
- Midwood 32-794: Two For The Road by Gerald Kramer
- Midwood 32-795: A Taste Of Shame by Jackson Harmon
- Midwood 33-796: Adult Education by Vin Fields
- Midwood 33-797: Two Women by Kimberly Kemp
- Midwood 33-798: Enraptured by March Hastings
- Midwood 34-799: Her First Mistake by Joan Ellis
- Midwood 34-800: Bad Penny by Dirk Malloy + Naughty Teen by Tom Roberts
- Midwood 34-801: Company Girl by Chad Denby + Take Me Home by Donna May
- Midwood 34-802: A Big Girl Now by Laura Duchamp + Up For Sale by John Jameson
- Midwood 34-803: Plaything by Jim Conroy + Fondly by Stuart Rand
- Midwood 43-804: The Lady From L.U.S.T. #1 [aka 'Lust, Be A Lady Tonight'] by Rod Gray
- Midwood 32-805: Ginny by Gil Hebert
- Midwood 32-806: Pleasure Play by Brad Curtis
- Midwood 32-807: The Janitor's Daughter by Amy Harris
- Midwood 33-808: Woman On A String by Carl Demarco
- Midwood 33-809: Three Can Play by Robert Wayne
- Midwood 34-810: Perfumed And Powered by Joe Weiss
- Midwood 34-811: Keep Me by Dana Pitman + Corrupt by Tammy James
- Midwood 34-812: Teen-Age Tramp by Jason Hytes + Born Bad [aka 'Puta' or 'Born To Be Bad'] by Lawrence Block
- Midwood 34-813: College Girl by Stephen Kane + Daring Coed by Frank Graham
- Midwood 34-814: Always Say Yes by Monty Brian + A Sure Thing by Vin Fields
- Midwood 43-815: One-Way Ticket by Jason Hytes
- Midwood 43-816: The Two Mrs. Carrolls by Helen Arvonen
- Midwood 43-817: They Knew Too Much by Gray Barker
- Midwood 42-818: Blood And Gold by Todhunter Ballard
- Midwood 43-819: Mission Incredible by Lawrence Cortesi
- Midwood 42-820: Abortion by William Lawrence
- Midwood 43-821: The Deceivers by Lee Costigan
- Midwood 42-822: Fight Or Die by Todhunter Ballard
- Midwood 43-823: The Two Mrs. Carrolls by Helen Arvonen
- Midwood 42-824: The Spy Who Came Home To Die by Jerry Well
- Midwood 32-825: Under The Skin by Laura Duchamp
- Midwood 32-826: Everything Nice by Joan Ellis
- Midwood 33-827: The Sexually Neurotic Male by A. Joseph Bursteln
- Midwood 32-828: One By One by Gus Stevens
- Midwood 33-829: Baby Sister by Greg Hamilton
- Midwood 34-830: Never Enough by Jason Hytes
- Midwood 34-831: Blanket Party by Dirk Malloy + Sultry Summer by Lon Albert
- Midwood 34-832: Bitter Choice by John Travis + Shadow Love by Nick Masters
- Midwood 34-833: On The Rebound by Ursula Grant + Executive Wife by Cynthia Sydney
- Midwood 34-834: Peeping Tom by Virginia West + Temptation by Tammy Jones
- Midwood 32-835: Pleasure Takers by John Balmer
- Midwood 32-836: Let's Play House by Joan Ellis
- Midwood 32-837: The Bisexual Woman by David Lynne
- Midwood 32-838: Teach Me by Amanda Moore
- Midwood 32-839: If A Man Answers by Grant Corgan
- Midwood 34-840: Too Much Woman by Jason Hytes
- Midwood 34-841: The Switch Set by Laura Duchamp + Delicate Tramp by Lawrence Black
- Midwood 34-842: Just For Kicks by Jim Conroy + Anxious To Please by Terry Shaffer
- Midwood 34-843: Out For Thrills by Mark Reading + The Perfumed Trap by Dean Merrick
- Midwood 34-844: Penthouse Tramp by Mason Lein + Off Limits by C.F. Denby
- Midwood 44-845: The Romance Of Violette by Unknown
- Midwood 46-846: Bushwhacked by Jeff Jeffries
- Midwood 43-847: The Dungeon by Mary Lee Falcon
- Midwood 43-848: The Terror Above Us by Malcom Kent
- Midwood 43-849: Grotesque Sex Crimes by William Ruben
- Midwood 33-850: Stag Starlet by Paul V. Russo
- Midwood 33-851: Sexual Behavior Of The American Housewife by W.D. Sprague
- Midwood 33-852: Born To Be Bad [aka 'Puta'] by Sheldon Lord
- Midwood 33-853: Sin School by Don Holliday
- Midwood 33-854: 21 Gay Street by Sheldon Lord
- Midwood 33-855: All My Lovers by Alan Marshall
- Midwood 33-856: The Blonde by Peggy Swenson
- Midwood 33-857: 69 Barrow Street by Sheldon Lord
- Midwood 34-858: No Men Wanted by Dallas Mayo + Switcher by Allan Horn
- Midwood 34-859: Summer Of Sin by Sloan Brittain + Campus Tramp by Edward McCallin
- Midwood 43-860: The Lady From L.U.S.T. #2 Lay Me Odds by Rob Gray
- Midwood 45-861: The Couch by D. Royal
- Midwood 43-862: Mistress Of The Shadows by Ruth MacLeod
- Midwood 43-863: Your Sins And Mine by George Parksmith
- Midwood 44-864: Winged Victory by Dan Brennan
- Midwood 42-865: The Violent Men by John S. Daniels
- Midwood 32-866: Adultery In Suburbia by Robert Brooks
- Midwood 32-867: Sin Now, Pay Later by Allan Horn
- Midwood 33-868: One At A Time by Lou Craig
- Midwood 34-869: Love Like A Shadow by Kimberly Kemp
- Midwood 33-870: Anybody's Girl by March Hastings
- Midwood 34-871: The Loving Couples by Jim Conroy
- Midwood 34-872: Any Way You Want It by Laura Duchamp + Room At The Bottom by Edward Moore
- Midwood 34-873: Action Girl by Dallas Mayo + Payment On Demand by Lucas J. Cassell
- Midwood 34-874: Go-Go Girl by Bruce Dale + A Special Talent by Eric Hamland
- Midwood 34-875: Almost A Virgin by Sloan Brittain + Pick-Up by Paul V. Russo
- Midwood 45-876: Fleshpots Of Antiquity by Henry Frichet
- Midwood 43-877: Sex Is Big Business by John Austin
- Midwood 43-878: The President's Right Hand by Dan Brennan
- Midwood 43-879: Rita by Jason Hytes
- Midwood 32-880: Sex And The Divorcee by David Lynne
- Midwood 33-881: Name Your Pleasure by Brad Curtis
- Midwood 33-882: The Seduction Game by Vin Fields
- Midwood 33-883: Always Available by Jim Conroy
- Midwood 33-884: Man Hungry by Alan Marshall
- Midwood 33-885: A Strange Kind Of Love by Sheldon Lord
- Midwood 34-886: Diagnosis: Adultery by S.R. Fontaine + Private Nurse by Lon Albert
- Midwood 34-887: No Time For Virgins by John Balmer + For Stags Only by Robert Bruce
- Midwood 34-888: Wet, Wild And Wonderful by Lucas J. Cassell + Anything For Kicks by Gene Norton
- Midwood 34-889: Warm Bodies by Joan Ellis + Gang Up by Tammy James
- Midwood 45-890: Woman In The Sexual Relation by H.H. Ploss and Max and Paul Bartels
- Midwood 43-891: The Summer Ghosts by Alexis Lykiard
- Midwood 43-892: Are The Invaders Coming? by Steven Tyler
- Midwood 42-893: The Pistoleros by E.E. Halloran
- Midwood 43-894: Mission Incredible: Battle Of The Bismark Sea by Lawrence Cortesi
- Midwood 34-895: Runaway Girls by Fred Shannon
- Midwood 34-896: Sleep-In Girl by Dick Kamp
- Midwood 34-897: Girls In Trouble by Amy Harris
- Midwood 34-898: The Sex Tests by Amanda Moore
- Midwood 34-899: Stag Show by Dallas Mayo
- Midwood 34-900: Insatiable by Sloan Brittain
- Midwood 34-901: Take Me by Mark Reading + What Price Incest by Don Haring
- Midwood 34-902: Kept by Laura Duchamp + Topless And Tempting by Max Nortic
- Midwood 34-903: Sin Sorority by Edward McCallin + The Waitress [aka 'Private Party'] by Chris Harrison
- Midwood 34-904: Daisy Chain by Greg Hamilton + Wild For Kicks by Terry Cash
- Midwood 45-905: Femina Libido Sexualis by H.H. Ploss and Max and Paul Bartels
- Midwood 43-906: The Human Zero by Various Authors
- Midwood 45-907: The Hindu Art Of Love by Edward Windsor
- Midwood 43-908: The Killer Breed by Various Authors
- Midwood 34-909: Connie by Loren Beauchamp
- Midwood 45-910: Autobiography Of A Louse by Unknown
- Midwood 44-911: Svetlana Alllluyeva: Flight To Freedom by James Hudson
- Midwood 43-912: The Lady From L.U.S.T. #3 The 69 Pleasures by Rob Gray
- Midwood 34-913: Double Your Pleasure by Gus Stevens
- Midwood 34-914: Nympho by Max Collier
- Midwood 34-915: Lover Boy by Max Nortic
- Midwood 34-916: Gigolo by Chris Harrison
- Midwood 34-917: Perfume And Pain by Kimberly Kemp
- Midwood 34-918: Any Man Will Do by Greg Hamilton
- Midwood 35-919: Crazy For Love by Dirk Malloy + One Hot Night by Cory Mallord
- Midwood 35-920: Twilight Sex by March Hastings + Unnatural by Luther Lee
- Midwood 35-921: Reluctant Virgin by Lucas J. Cassel + Very Private Secretary by Gil Herbert
- Midwood 35-922: Teen Swinger by Terry Cash + Girls Camp by Edward McCallin
- Midwood 45-923: The Hostage by D. Royal
- Midwood 42-924: The Hunted by John S. Daniels
- Midwood 43-925: Before I Die by Lionel White
- Midwood 45-926: The Sexual History Of France by Henry L. Marchand
- Midwood 34-927: Pagan by Paul V. Russo
- Midwood 34-928: Baby Doll by Edward McCallin
- Midwood 34-929: The Sex Zone by Sloan Brittain
- Midwood 34-930: Anything Goes by Peter McCurtin
- Midwood 45-931: The Turkish Art Of Love by Pinhas Ben-Nahum
- Midwood 42-932: Dead Reckoning by Kenneth Fowler
- Midwood 43-933: Yesterday's Virgin by Jason Hytes
- Midwood 35-934: The Sex Between by Jason Hytes + When Ladies Love by Jason Hytes
- Midwood 34-935: The Farmer's Wife by Chris Harrison
- Midwood 34-936: Pushover by Max Nortic
- Midwood 34-937: Sex In The Shadows by Greg Hamilton
- Midwood 34-938: Easy by Peggy Swanson
- Midwood 34-939: Voyeur by Jim Conroy
- Midwood 34-940: Her First Time by Joan Ellis
- Midwood 35-941: For Love Or Money by Gus Stevens + Office Tease by Vin Fields
- Midwood 34-942: Group Sex by Max Collier
- Midwood 34-943: I, Lesbian by M.L. Johnson
- Midwood 43-944: The Lady From L.U.S.T. #4 5 Beds To Mecca by Rod Gray
- Midwood 42-945: Day Of The Gun by William Cox
- Midwood 43-946: Sex Before Six by Jason Hytes
- Midwood 42-947: The Doomsday Planet by Harl Vincent
- Midwood 44-948: Jacqueline, Daughter Of Marquis de Sade by Jean-Paul Denard
- Midwood 44-949: Memoirs Of A Harem Girl by Aisha
- Midwood 34-950: No Holds Barred by Luther Lee
- Midwood 34-951: Sex Club by John Borden
- Midwood 35-952: Almost Like Rape by Lucas J. Cassel + One Hot Weekend by J.C. Comstock
- Midwood 35-953: Runaway Teen by Amy Harris + The Marriage Wrecker by Terry Shaffer
- Midwood 34-954: Meet Me At The Motel by Gus Stevens
- Midwood 34-955: The Trip by Palmer Lane
- Midwood 34-956: Fraternity Pet by Edward McCallin
- Midwood 43-957: The Not-Men by Jack Williamson
- Midwood 42-958: The Day The Killers Came by John S. Daniels
- Midwood 43-959: That Moment Of Passion by Richard Lortz
- Midwood 43-960: The Cave Of Chinese Skeltons by Jack Seward
- Midwood 34-961: School Tease by Robert Hadley
- Midwood 34-962: Ladder Of Flesh by Sloan Brittain
- Midwood 34-963: The Unashamed by March Hastings
- Midwood 34-964: The Outrage by Greg Hamilton
- Midwood 34-965: Sex Ranch by Chris Harrison
- Midwood 35-966: The Sex Game by Arjay Scott + Young And Hot by Ary Phillips
- Midwood 35-967: School For Seduction by Dirk Malloy + Campus Hotshot by Terry Cash
- Midwood 42-968: Lassiter by Jack Slade
- Midwood ??-969:
- Midwood 43-970: Dracula's Curse by Bram Stoker
- Midwood 43-971: Rebels In The Streets by Kitty Hanson
- Midwood 43-972: The Fires Within by Jack David
- Midwood 44-973: Her Secret Life by Xman Ranier
- Midwood 34-974: A Choice Of Sexes by Carol Caine
- Midwood 34-975: Miss Round Heels by Gerald Kramer
- Midwood 34-976: Odd Girl On Campus by Joan Ellis
- Midwood 34-977: Jailbait by Edward McCallin
- Midwood 34-978: Again And Again by March Hastings
- Midwood 34-979: Pretty Puppet by Dallas Mayo
- Midwood 34-980: To Sex, With Love by Lucas J. Cassel
- Midwood 34-981: Tony's Room by Jay Greene
- Midwood 35-982: Sin Time by Terry Shaffer + Office Pet by Allan Horn
- Midwood 35-983: Playgirl by Lou Craig + Just Ask by Mel Johnson
- Midwood 42-984: Winter Kill by William Harrison
- Midwood 45-985: The Asbestos Diary by Casimir Dukahz
- Midwood 43-986: The Time Curve by Various Authors
- Midwood 43-987: Intimate Strangers by Harry Robbins
- Midwood 44-988: Spirit World by Houdini + Psychic Revelations by Dunninger
- Midwood 44-989: The Lady From L.U.S.T. #5 The Hot Mahatma by Rod Gray
- Midwood 34-990: Sex On Arrival by Alan Marshall
- Midwood 34-991: Thank Me Later by Carol Caine
- Midwood 34-992: Married Tramp by Max Nortic
- Midwood 34-993: Campus Pet by Joan Ellis
- Midwood 34-994: Instant Sex by Mel Johnson
- Midwood 34-995: Three by Dallas Mayo
- Midwood 34-996: Party Time by Kimberly Kemp
- Midwood 34-997: Image Of Evil by Paul V. Russo
- Midwood 35-998: Try Me by Dirk Makkoy + Come And Get It by Bertrand Lord
- Midwood 35-999: Hot Hands by Don Haring + Wild Teen by Vin Fields
- Midwood 42-100: The Professional by Joseph Chadwick
- Midwood 42-101: Lassiter #2 - Bandido by Jack Slade
- Midwood 34-102: Weekend Of Sex by Max Collier
- Midwood 34-103: Wild Angel by Edward McCallin
- Midwood 34-104: The Odd Man by Leon Sorell
- Midwood 34-105: The Baby Sitter by Vin Fields
- Midwood 34-106: Swinging Secretary by Alan Marshall
- Midwood 34-107: A Woman Like Me by Carol Caine
- 1968 Midwood 34-108: Pleasure Machine by Sheldon Lord
- Midwood 34-109: Reluctant Nympho by Joan Ellis
- Midwood 35-110: Beach Stud by Terry Cash + Sex In The Sun by Jack Holt
- Midwood 35-111: Teen Tease by Bertrand Lord + Never Too Young by Dana Pitman
- Midwood 43-112: Why Did They Kill Charley? by Carter Travis Young
- Midwood 44-113: The Dillinger Story by Ovid Demaris
- Midwood 43-114: Strangers In The Night by Harry Robbins
- Midwood 44-115: Psychogeist by L.P. Davies
- Midwood 34-116: Eighteen And Legal by Marck Reading
- Midwood 34-117: Obsessed by Max Nortic
- Midwood 34-118: Fun Girl by Grant Corgan
- Midwood 34-119: The Boss's Couch by Jim Conroy
- Midwood 34-120: Teen Hippie by Peggy Swenson
- Midwood 34-121: World Of Women by Carol Caine
- Midwood 34-122: Taboo by Sloan Brittain
- Midwood 35-123: Bedside Manners by Dirk Malloy + Student Nurse by Shawana Dennis
- Midwood 35-124: Swinging Sorority (Edward McCallin
- Midwood 37-125: Hot Co-ed by Joan Ellis + Office Pushover by Jason Hytes + Gay Interlude by Sloan Brittain
- Midwood 44-126: The Lady From L.U.S.T. #6 To Russia With L.U.S.T. by Rod Gray
- Midwood 43-127: This Girl by Jason Hytes
- Midwood 42-128: The Wolfer by James B. Chaffin
- Midwood 44-129: The Dutch Schultz Story by Ted Addy
- Midwood 44-130: The Magnificent Bastards Of Vietnam by Lawrence Cortesi
- Midwood 35-131: Sorority Sinners by Brian North + Under The Covers by Greg Hamilton
- Midwood 35-132: Teach Me Tonight by Chales Castleman + Put Out Or Else by Albert Powell
- Midwood 35-133: Peep Show by Sloan Brittain + Thrill Me by Don Harvey
- Midwood 35-134: Campus Nympho by Carol Caine + Ex-Virgin by Stephanie Chrisman
- Midwood 43-135: The Quiet Man by L.L. Foreman
- Midwood 42-136: Lassiter #3 The Man From Yuma by W.T. Ballard
- Midwood 44-137: Legs Diamond by Sam Curzon
- Midwood 43-138: The Bargain by John Turner
- Midwood 35-139: Sex Slave by Paul V. Russo + Keyhole Thrills by Lucas J. Cassel
- Midwood 37-140: Ermine by Kimberly Kemp + Gay Harem by Greg Hamilton + Campus Roundheels by Robert Hadley
- Midwood 37-141: Teen-Age Sex Party by Joan Ellis + Office Playmate by Jill Hammond + Experiment In Adultery by March Hastings
- Midwood 35-142: Sorority Scandal by Dallas Mayo + The Secret Flesh by Carol Caine
- Midwood 35-143: Teen-Age Rebel by Dana Pitman + Red Hot Virgin by Brian North
- Midwood 35-144: High School Thrill Club by Edward McCallin + Virgin Territory by Frank Sawyer
- Midwood 35-145: How Strange My Love by Chris Harrison
- Midwood 35-146: I Want A Man by John Balmer + I Can't Wait by Leon Sorell
- Midwood 35-147: Candy by Sheldon Lord
- Midwood 34-148: Behind These Walls by Jay Greene
- Midwood 35-149: Pretty Boy by Jay Greene
- Midwood 35-150: Prescription For Sex by Vin Fields + Night Nurse by Max Nortic
- Midwood 35-151: Teacher's Pet by Edward McCallin + Private Lessons by Frank Sawyer
- Midwood 35-152: Lipstick And Leather by Chris Harrison + Wicked Woman by Arnold Evans
- Midwood 37-153: Two Of A Kind by Kimberly Kemp + Virgin Wanted by Max Nortic + Invitation To Rape by Joan Ellis
- Midwood 35-154: Do It Again by Greg Hamilton + The Sex Seekers by Robert Hadley
- Midwood ??-155:
- Midwood 35-156: Born A Tramp by Terry Cash + Seduce Me by Jackson Harmon
- Midwood 37-157: Master Of Women by March Hastings + Chained by Mel Johnson + Love Captive by Dallas Mayo
- Midwood 44-158: The Lucky Luciano Story by Ovid Demaris
- Midwood 43-159: The Eurasian Virgins by Jack Seward
- Midwood 44-160: The Lady From L.U.S.T. #7 Kiss My Assassin by Rod Gray
- Midwood 43-161: The Frogman Assassination by Jack Seward
- Midwood 43-162: The Shaming Of Broken Horn by Bill Gulick
- Midwood 34-163: Blonde On A Blanket by Edward McCallin
- Midwood 35-164: The Cadets by Jay Greene
- Midwood 35-165: She Couldn't Stop by Joan Ellis + Attacked! by Erica Dewitt
- Midwood 42-166: Proudly They Die by Lewis B. Patten
- Midwood 43-167: Felony Tank by Malcolm Braly
- Midwood 45-168: Rough Trade by Jay Greene
- Midwood 42-169: Lassiter #4 The Man From Cheyenne by Jack Slade
- Midwood ??-170:
- Midwood 44-171: The Lady From L.U.S.T. #8 South Of The Bordello by Rod Gray
- Midwood ??-172:
- Midwood 35-173: Little Girl by Terry Shaffer + Born For Passion by Walter Davidson
- Midwood 35-174: Forbidden Love by Paul V. Russo + Strange Desires by Gerald Kramer
- Midwood 35-175: Wild Waitress by Jack Holt + Thrill Hungry by Bertrand Lord
- Midwood 35-176: Odd Couple by Peggy Swenson + Teen Butch by Carol Caine
- Midwood 34-177: Stud by Sheldon Lord
- Midwood 34-178: Sex Unlimited by Sloan Brittain
- Midwood 37-179: Kiss And Run by Mel Johnson
- Midwood 37-180: Virgin No More by Sloan Brittain
- Midwood 45-181: Affairs by John London
- Midwood 45-182: The Boys And Bringham Dee by March Hastings
- Midwood 34-183: Free Sample [aka 'Wayward Widow'] by Loren Beauchamp
- Midwood 44-184: The Blunderers by James A. Hudson
- Midwood 42-185: Galaxy 666 by Pel Torro
- Midwood ??-186:
- Midwood 43-187: Bones Of The Buffalo by Lewis B. Patten
- Midwood 35-188: Bedtime Lessons by Lee Harman + Anxious To Please by Lee Harman
- Midwood 35-189: The Sin Generation by Joan Ellis + Teen In Trouble by Greg Hamilton
- Midwood 37-190: Gay Girls by Carol Caine + Switch-Hitter by March Hastings + Unnatural Love by Greg Hamilton
- Midwood 37-191: Sex Incorporated by Sloan Brittain + Swinging Stewardess by Dirk Malloy + Married Nympho by Grant Corgan
- Midwood 35-192: Bitter Wine by Jay Greene
- Midwood 34-193: The Peeper by Sheldon Lord
- Midwood 35-194: Strange by Dallas Mayo + Twilight Women by Lee Harmon
- Midwood 35-195: Running Wild by Peggy Swenson + Love-In by Greg Hamilton
- Midwood 35-196: The Other Way by Robert Hadley + Strange Fascination by Greg Hamilton
- Midwood 35-197: College Tease by Joan Ellis + Town Tramp by Walter Davidson
- Midwood 37-198: Campus Swinger by Dirk Malloy + Virgins Are Best by Jack Holt
- Midwood 37-199: Young And Eager by Jim Conroy + Quickie by Gene Evans + Nympho Nurse by Mel Johnson
- Midwood 35-200: Flesh by Max Collier + The Sadist by Mel Johnston
- Midwood 43-201: The Dark Side Of Love by John O'Mara
- Midwood 42-202: Brand of Hate by Frank Castle
- Midwood 43-203: The Trap by Lewis B. Patten
- Midwood 35-204: Nino by Jay Greene
- Midwood 34-205: Strange Triangle by Chris Harrison
- Midwood 37-206: Diary Of A Parisian Chambermaid by Claudine Dumas
- Midwood 37-207: My Wicked Pleasures by Molly X
- Midwood 42-208: Guns Of Fury by Ernest Haycox
- Midwood 43-209: The Chinese Pleasure Girl by Jack Seward
- Midwood 45-210: The Harem Of Ain Sebaa by Ary Caldwell Phillip
- Midwood 45-211: The Strasburg Collection by Ellen McGinnis
- Midwood 45-212: The Lady From L.U.S.T. #9 The Poisoned Pussy [aka 'Sock It to Me'] by Rod Gray
- Midwood 35-213: Single Swingers by Joan Ellis + Torrid by Dan Harvey
- Midwood 35-214: Sex Service by Peter McCurtin + Games by Greg Hamilton
- Midwood 35-215: Black Satin by Max Nortic + White Thighs by Jim Conroy
- Midwood 35-216: High School Nympho by John Balmer + Cradle Robber by Gus Stevens
- Midwood 37-217: Mini-Tramp by Joan Ellis + In Heat by Lee Harmon + Jet Set Sex by Robert Hadley
- Midwood 37-218: Just Whistle by Greg Hamilton + Wide Open by Dirk Malloy + Stripped by Terry Shaffer
- Midwood 43-219: Lassiter #5 A Hell Of A Way To Die by Jack Slade
- Midwood 45-220: Seductions by John London
- Midwood 43-221: Carmody by Joseph Chadwick
- Midwood 43-222: Bondage by John Turner
- Midwood 34-223: Sea Of Thighs by Sloan Britain
- Midwood 37-224: Come One, Come All by Greg Hamilton + Three-Way Scene by Joan Ellis + Change Partners by Gerald Kramer
- Midwood 35-225: Bunk Buddies by Sky James
- Midwood 35-226: Depraved by Max Nortic + A.C.-D.C. by Lee Harmon
- Midwood 35-227: Do It To Me by Mel Johnson + Hot Blonde by Jim Conroy
- Midwood 35-228: On The Make by Jack Holt + Layaway Plan by Gene Evans
- Midwood 35-229: The Sweetest Vice by Greg Hamilton + Gently My Love by Greg Hamilton
- Midwood 35-230: A Girl A Night by Mark Reading + Sex And Me by Lee Harmon
- Midwood 37-231: Breaking Loose by Julie Ellis + Once a Tramp by Walter Davidson + Sisters In Sin by Leon Sorell
- Midwood 37-232: Born To Give by Mel Johnson
- Midwood 34-233: Pagan Summer by Dallas Mayo
- Midwood 34-234: The Whispered Love by Dallas Mayo
- Midwood 43-235: Bushwhacked by Jeff Jeffries
- Midwood 35-236: Why Be A Virgin by Joan Ellis + Young And Ready by Terry Shaffer
- Midwood 35-237: Girl On Fire by Max Nortic + Teach Me How by Robert Hadley
- Midwood 35-238: End Of Innocence by Mark Reading + Reckless Virgin by Loraine Sutton
- Midwood 35-239: Strange Worlds by Greg Hamilton + Gay Roommates by Lee Harmon
- Midwood 35-240: School For Sin by Max Nortic + Let Me Watch by Terry Cash
- Midwood 35-241: High School Stud by Robert Hadley + Campus Doll by Mel Jonson
- Midwood 37-242: Motel by Max Nortic
- Midwood 37-243: Lulie; Recollections Of A Slave Girl by Unknown
- Midwood 35-244: Line-Up by Lin Evans
- Midwood 37-245: Hot Hostess by Joan Ellis + Once Is Never Enough by Gus Stevens + Time On Her Hands by Gene Evans
- Midwood 43-246: Bloch And Bradbury by Robert Bloch & Ray Bradbury
- Midwood 43-247: The Last Astronaut by Pel Torro
- Midwood 43-248: Escape From Yuma by Frank Castle
- Midwood 47-249: The Trial by Linda DuBreuil
- Midwood 43-250: Lassiter #6 High Lonesome by Jack Slade
- Midwood 43-251: The Three Faces Of Time by Frank Belknap Long
- Midwood 34-252: Nymph by Peggy Swensen
- Midwood 35-253: Girl Games by Veronica King + Twisted by Dorothy Wilde
- Midwood 37-254: The Honey Trap by Jon Wolfe
- Midwood 37-255: Season for Sin by J. O'Mara + Seminar In Sex by Alvin Marvell + Country Club Stud by Jack Holt
- Midwood 37-256: Let's Do It by Clay Grant + High Score Girl by Erica DeWitt + Stolen Goods by Lin Evans
- Midwood 37-257:
- Midwood 34-258: Soft And Easy by Dallas Mayo
- Midwood ??-259:
- Midwood ??-260:
- Midwood ??-261:
- Midwood 37-262: Flesh Games - Memoirs Of A Scoundrel by Unknown
- Midwood 47-263: The Enormous Bed by Mike Carroll
- Midwood 43-264: Lassiter #7 Sidewinder by Frank Castle
- Midwood 43-265: The White Apache by L.L. Foreman
- Midwood 44-266: Black Harvest by William S. Tyrone
- Midwood 43-267: Assignment Find Cherry by Jack Seward
- Midwood 43-268: Beyond The Barrier Of Space by Pel Torro
- Midwood 34-269: Play With Me by Kimberly Kemp
- Midwood 35-270: Sweet Sickness by Mark Reading + Ladies' Choice by Gil Johns
- Midwood 35-271: Split-Shift Sex by Peggy Aldrich + Crazy For It by Dick Scott
- Midwood 37-272: Reckless Wife by Connie Nelson + Catch Me-Keep Me by John Balmer + Soiled by Jim Conroy
- Midwood 37-273: Virgin Offering by James Miller
- Midwood 37-274: Soul Orgy by Aldo Lucchesi
- Midwood 43-275: Star Giant by Dorothy Skinkle
- Midwood 45-276: The Lady From L.U.S.T. #10 The Big Snatch by Rod Gray
- Midwood 34-277: Secret Cravings [aka 'The Last Resort'] by Kimberly Kemp
- Midwood 35-278: Shack-Up by Frank Reeves + Quick To Learn by Terry Shaffer
- Midwood 37-279: Night After Night by Robert Hadley + Cindy by Harry McLane + Games Virgins Play by Tracy Cook
- Midwood 37-280: Sinful Sarah by Unknown
- Midwood 37-281: The Young Stallions by Beaverly Beaumont
- Midwood 37-282: Devil In The Flesh by Gloria Steinway
- Midwood 37-283: The Pleasure Thing by Mike Carroll
- Midwood 43-284: Feud Valley by Walt Coburn
- Midwood 43-285: Only The Brave by Paul Evan Lehman
- Midwood 37-286: Possessed by Max Nortic
- Midwood 37-287: The Hostage by D. Royal
- Midwood 37-288: Stud For Hire by Alf Obolensky
- Midwood 35-289: Gang Girl by Walter Davidson + Time For One More by Peggy Swenson
- Midwood 34-290: Teen On Call by Greg Hamilton
- Midwood 37-291: Musical Beds by Gil Johns
- Midwood 37-292: Initiation by Philip Halden + Casino Butch by Kimberly Kemp
- Midwood 37-293: Victims by Bradley Hall
- Midwood 37-294: The Couch by D. Royal
- Midwood 37-295: Spasm by Daryl McCauley
- Midwood 37-296: The Climax by Malcolm Corris
- Midwood 38-297: Flesh Festival by Aldo Lucchesi
- Midwood 38-298: Babychick by Odda De Lazzo
- Midwood 45-299: The Lady From L.U.S.T. #11 Lady In Heat by Rod Gray
- Midwood ??-300:
- Midwood 43-301: Lode by Greg Hamilton
- Midwood 43-302: Ramrod by Merle Clark
- Midwood 43-303: Hell Branded by Chuck Mason
- Midwood 43-304: The Unending Night by George H. Smith
- Midwood 37-305: Stud Power by Veronica King
- Midwood 37-306: Sex Fire by Cynthia
- Midwood 37-307: Silky by Dallas Mayo
- Midwood 37-308: Jacqueline, Daughter Of The Marquis De Sade by Jean Paul Denard
- Midwood 37-309: Soul Mate by Claudine Cia + Three On A Bed by Terry Shaffer
- Midwood 37-310: Sweet Sin by J. Elis
- Midwood 37-311: I Am The Lie by Susanna Scherr
- Midwood 37-312: Brandenburg Heights by John Seberg
- Midwood 37-313: Starlet by Dick Scott
- Midwood 37-314: Slow Burn by Marcus Pendanter
- Midwood 37-315: Her Wicked, Wicked Ways by Brian Barue
- Midwood 38-316: The Inheritors by Odda Delazzo
- Midwood 37-317: Lady Finger by Malcolm Corris
- Midwood 37-318: Screwed Up by Doral Scott
- Midwood 38-319: Andromedia Lain by Mitchell Criterion
- Midwood 37-320: The Moth And The Flame by Anonymous
- Midwood 43-321: Tower At The Edge Of Time by Lin Carter
- Midwood 43-322: The Trouble Grabber by Frank C. Robertson
- Midwood 43-323: Strawberry Roan by Nelson Nye
- Midwood ??-324:
- Midwood ??-325:
- Midwood ??-326:
- Midwood ??-327:
- Midwood 38-328: Sex Magus by Aldo Lucchesi
- Midwood 37-329: One Man's Meat by James Miller + Pajama Pickup by Vin Fields
- Midwood 37-330: You've Come A Long Way, Baby by Veronica King
- Midwood 38-331: Swapped by Lin Evans + Love Clinic by Jack Holt
- Midwood 37-332: The Sybarites by Odda DeLazzo
- Midwood 37-333: Lay The Devil by Adrian Cross
- Midwood 38-334: Up And Coming by Bruce Elliot
- Midwood 38-335: An Intimate Life by Robert Hadley + Coed In Distress by Margaret Penn
- Midwood 37-336: The Flake by Odda DeLazzo
- Midwood 38-337: Total Awareness by Max Nortic
- Midwood 37-338: Sex-In by Ignatius Stone
- Midwood 37-339: The Sex Underground by Kermit Klitch

=== Collector's Classics Series ===
- Midwood 125-1: Alexandra by Roderick Pullman
- Midwood 125-2: The Girl Hunter by Veronica King + Lust Game by Walter Davidson
- Midwood 125-3: The Jock by Douglas Kennedy + The Sins In Her Eyes by Mary Singleton
- Midwood 125-4: Oral Orbit by Norman Jackson
- Midwood 125-5: Love Commune by Robert Hadley
- Midwood 125-6: The 900 Ways by James Hillman
- Midwood 125-7: Muscle by Aldo Lucchesi
- Midwood 125-8: Where The Bee Sucks by Manny Gihan
- Midwood 125-9: Sadie Maize by Gay Whipple
- Midwood 125-10: The Big Ball by Marcus Pendanter
- Midwood 125-11: How They Do It In Rio by J.C. Thomas
- Midwood 125-12: Baby Jade by Cynthia
- Midwood 125-13: The Bedmobile by Honey Potimkin
- Midwood 125-14: Games Grownups Play by Mitchell Criterion
- Midwood 125-15: Sugar And Spice And Everything Twice by Kermitt Klitch
- Midwood 125-16: The Marriage Raper by Elizabeth West
- Midwood 125-17: Down On Me by Alyss Poplin
- Midwood 125-18: Doctor Fingerlove by Wallace Arthur
- Midwood 125-19: Juicy Lucy by Mason Southern
- Midwood 125-20: The Perfect Oh by Samantha Rider
- Midwood 125-21: The Sensualists by Odda DeLazzo
- Midwood 125-22: Sex Incorporated by Serena Wilson
- Midwood 125-23: Lesbian Interlude by Dallas Mayo
- Midwood 125-24: Felicia by Tod Parker
- Midwood 125-25: Moonbabies by Eric Jay
- Midwood 125-26: A Long Time Coming by Jon Thomas
- Midwood 125-27: Pandora Descending by Linda DuBreuil
- Midwood 125-28: Masques Of Eros by John Holt
- Midwood 125-29: A Very Pretty Story by Cynthia
- Midwood 125-30: Nightrider by Charles DeGallamania
- Midwood 125-31: The Bride In The Bed With The Mirrors 'Round Her Head by Veronica King
- Midwood 125-32: Call Me Calamity by John Cleve
- Midwood 125-33: Neversleep by Francine Janssen
- Midwood 125-34: Oh! The Trailer Park Parties! by Bruce Elliot
- Midwood 125-35: Synthetic Madonna by Lin Evans
- Midwood 125-36: The Girl Who Did It by Robert Davis
- Midwood 125-37: The Woman Zapper by Gus Stevens
- Midwood 125-38: I Am Curious by Montgomery Popoff
- Midwood 125-39: Different Strokes For Different Folks by Kermit Klitch
- Midwood 125-40: Naked Came The Skater by J.J. Madison
- Midwood 125-41: Astrosex by George Shaw
- Midwood 125-42: Freeze by Manfred Asher
- Midwood 125-43: A Pocket Full by Imo Yashima
- Midwood 125-44: Warm, Very Warm by Liam Mcdonald Downs
- Midwood 125-45: Guts by J. Pinetree
- Midwood 125-46: The Four-Letter Word by Mitchell Criterion
- Midwood 125-47: Suoer Jock by D. Royal
- Midwood 125-48: The Doll Game by Odda deLazzo
- Midwood 125-49: Nymphs-Horses-Men by Walter F. Levereaux
- Midwood 125-50: Circuit-Breaker by Veronica King
- Midwood 125-51: Busted by Dirk Ramport
- Midwood 125-52: Speak No Evil by Virgo
- Midwood 125-53: The Mating Game by Tim Lang
- Midwood 125-54: Once Upon A Hayloft by A. D. Ryan
- Midwood 125-55: The Love Gun by Alexander Keith
- Midwood 125-56: Nashville Rebel by Carter Cash
- Midwood 125-57: Bill & Carol & Tom & Ellie by J.J. Madison
- Midwood 125-58: School For Scandal by Vince Deluca
- Midwood 125-59: The Cheapest Thrill by Abbie Kaufman
- Midwood 125-60: In Their Cups by Honey Potimkin
- Midwood 125-61: Any Way You Want It by Kermit Klitch
- Midwood 125-62: How They Do It In China by Mei-en Lu
- Midwood 125-63: Friction by Cynthia
- Midwood 125-64: Do It, Do It, Do It, Ba--Aby by Harry Robertson
- Midwood 125-65: Swallow The Leader by John Cleve
- Midwood 125-66: Point Red by Veronica
- Midwood 125-67: The Big Spread by Percy Stevenson
- Midwood 125-68: Connie by Loren Beauchamp
- Midwood 125-69: So Tight by I.A. Grenville
- Midwood 125-70: Pulling Taffy by Tompkins Parke
- Midwood 125-71: Balls by Samantha Rider
- Midwood 125-72: Viva Sex by Sasha Sibacca
- Midwood 125-73: Fresh Tail by Gerald Kramer
- Midwood 125-74: Bang! by George Shaw
- Midwood 125-75: The Mating by Eric Jay
- Midwood 125-76: The Intimates by Dirk Ramport
- Midwood 125-77: How Nice Of You To Come by Scott Smith
- Midwood 125-78: Track Tramp by Carl Driver
- Midwood 125-79: Voyeur's Delight by Alan Bell
- Midwood 125-80: Member's Rise by Marc Stone
- Midwood 125-81: Girls In A Thousand Windows by Kermit Klitch
- Midwood 125-82: Autobiography Of A Louse, Vol. III by Unknown
- Midwood 125-83: The Hottest Tip by Vince DeLuca
- Midwood 125-84: Exposed by Burt Silver
- Midwood 125-85: A Very Private Nurse by Jack Gunther
- Midwood 125-86: Black Satin Sheets by Mike Winston
- Midwood 125-87: Freeze... And Respond by Gil Johns
- Midwood 125-88: The Passion Workers by Florence
- Midwood 125-89: Roll Me Over by Israel Krupp
- Midwood 125-90: Open All Night by John London
- Midwood 125-91: Soul Touch by Linda DuBreuil
- Midwood 125-92: Made With Love by Colin Harrington
- Midwood 125-93: My, How You've Grown! by Richard Lupino
- Midwood 125-94: On Her Back Again by Werner Hillenbrand
- Midwood 125-95: Bare Strangers by George Myers
- Midwood 125-96: Lie Down So We Can Talk by Werner Hillenbrand
- Midwood 125-97: R.S.V.P. by If You Come by Jim Conway
- Midwood 125-98: Call Me Woman by Gloria Stamen
- Midwood 125-99: Satan's Touch by Michael Packard

=== Private Library Editions ===
- Midwood 175-1: Rock-A-Bye, Baby by George Shaw
- Midwood 175-2: Blowout by Aldo Lucchesi
- Midwood 175-3: The American Coed Scandal by Donna Sanford
- Midwood 175-4: Vice And Consent by Marcus Pendanter
- Midwood 175-5: Saint Of Lust by N
- Midwood 175-6: Membranes by Gil Johns
- Midwood 175-7: The Circle Device by Honey Potimkin
- Midwood 175-8: Hoagie McAllisters Topless Airlines by Arjay Scott
- Midwood 175-9: Confessions Of A Captive Sibyl by Pamela Kaye
- Midwood 175-10: I Will Return And Claim My Bed by Max Nortic
- Midwood 175-11: Rock Revel by Roderick Pullman
- Midwood 175-12: This Book Rated "X" by Linda DuBreuil
- Midwood 175-13: Shadow Of A Man by Jay Greene
- Midwood 175-14: The Fire Island Dirty Dozen Minus 2 by Norman Jackson
- Midwood 175-15: Daddy And Me, And Brother Makes Three by Serena Wilson
- Midwood 175-16: The Diabolists by Wallace Arthur
- Midwood 175-17: I, A Sensualist by Steven Barry
- Midwood 175-18: Incest by R. Lambert
- Midwood 175-19: Inferno Of Women by Ania Palmer
- Midwood 175-20: The Carnals by Stan Mitchell
- Midwood 175-21: Satyricon 70 by Roberto
- Midwood 175-22: Sliding In by Guy Martin
- Midwood 175-23: Seed by John Cleve
- Midwood 175-24: The Nurse Came Naked by Justine Haynes
- Midwood 175-25: Island Of Desire by Max Nortic
- Midwood 175-26: The Man Who Gathered Cherries by Peter Quinn
- Midwood 175-27: Mardi Gras Madam by Emmett X. Reed
- Midwood 175-28: Deeper And Deeper by J. Pinetree
- Midwood 175-29: Juice Of Love by John Cleve
- Midwood 175-30: Fanny Hell Blows Madison Avenue by Norman Jackson
- Midwood 175-31: On Campus by Peter Kanto
- Midwood 175-32: Midnight Trash by J.J. Madison
- Midwood 175-33: Getting Hard by Gus Stevens
- Midwood 175-34: House Of Pain by Virgo
- Midwood 175-35: Shadow Of A Man by Jay Greene
- Midwood 175-36: And Where She Stops Nobody Knows by Cynthia
- Midwood 175-37: Exotic Experiments by Robert Evelyn
- Midwood 175-38: Playing Dirty by Gloria Wilcox
- Midwood 175-39: Crescendo by Stan Mitchell
- Midwood 175-40: The Girl Who Couldn't Say No by Robert Lambert
- Midwood 175-41: Senor Rogue by Unknown
- Midwood 175-42: Mafia Mistress by Guy Martin
- Midwood 175-43: The Grind by Duke Morrison
- Midwood 175-44: Finger Man by Raphael deSantiago
- Midwood 175-45: Stud Ranch by Gus Stevens
- Midwood 175-46: The Throb by Vic Puccini
- Midwood 175-47: The Ultimate Sin by Walter Levereaux
- Midwood 175-48: Hot Flash by Robb Stanley
- Midwood 175-49: Honey by Max Nortic
- Midwood 175-50: Angel Of The Morning by James Miller
- Midwood 175-51: Miss American Queen by Rosemary Bell
- Midwood 175-52: Dedicated To Rape by Alexander Keith
- Midwood 175-53: Stud by Guy Martin
- Midwood 175-54: The Sinner by Robert Eli
- Midwood 175-55: The Source Of All Needs by James Wilson
- Midwood 175-56: The Second Coming by John Cleve

=== Peacock and Cameo Editions ===
- Midwood 195-1: House Of Illusion by Mitchell Criterion
- Midwood 195-2: Poker Power by Robert Hadley
- Midwood 195-3: Here, Pussy, Pussy by Israel Krupp
- Midwood 195-4: Rest In Piece by Linda Dubreuil
- Midwood 195-5: Gettin' It Together by Linda DuBreuil
- Midwood 195-6: Man Hole by Chris Harrison
- Midwood 195-7: Vegas Virgins by Gus Stevens
- Midwood 195-8: Tycoon by Delmas Abbott
- Midwood 195-8: Between Joy's Legs by Baron Wells
- Midwood 195-9: Captives In The Chateau De Sade by John Cleve
- Midwood 195-10: Cruising by Jay Greene
- Midwood 195-11: Skin Flick Stud by Robert Hadley
- Midwood 195-12: Beautiful Bitch by Guy Martin
- Midwood 195-13: The Knickerbocker Report by Tom Knickerbocker
- Midwood 195-14: Boys in The Bed by Niko Stavros
- Midwood 195-15: Night Stick by D. Royal
- Midwood 195-16: Entry by Linda DuBreuil
- Midwood 195-17: Obsession by H.M.
- Midwood 195-18: The Body Shop by J.J. Madison
- Midwood 195-19: Syndicate Sex by Michael Criterion
- Midwood 195-20: The Real Thing by Max Nortic
- Midwood 195-21: Erotica Satanica by Morgana Trehune
- Midwood 195-22: The Godson by Jay Greene
- Midwood 195-23: Black Man's Harem by John Cleve
- Midwood 195-24: Obedience by Mason Campbell
- Midwood 195-25: Measurements by Unknown
- Midwood 195-26: The Act Of Acts by Wade Graham
- Midwood 195-27: And Then Came... by John Bailey
- Midwood 195-28: Gamecock by Guy Martin
- Midwood 195-29: The Devoured by John Cleve
- Midwood 195-30: The Dirtiest Dozen by Derek Miles
- Midwood 195-31: Ohhhhh, It Feels Like Dying by J.J. Madison
- Midwood 195-32: Possession by Frederick Bailey
- Midwood 195-33: Feel Me, Smell Me, Taste Me by Esme Glasse
- Midwood 195-34: An Itch In Time by Kermit Klitch
- Midwood 195-35: Men's Room by Jay Greene
- Midwood 195-36: When Virtue Fails by Hardy Peters
- Midwood 195-37: Come Together by Angus McClintock
- Midwood 195-38: Blow Gently by Dallas Kovar
- Midwood 195-39: Too Much Is Not Enough by Peter McCurtin
- Midwood 195-40: Gypsy Virgin [aka 'Code Name Gypsy Virgin'] by Max Nortic
- Midwood 195-41: Wicked Bodies by R. Hadley
- Midwood 195-42: Easy Come by Cliff David
- Midwood 195-43: What's Up? by Chuck Watts
- Midwood 195-44: French Job by Florence King
- Midwood 195-45: Pussy Island by John Cleve
- Midwood 195-46: Bare It by Peter Quinn
- Midwood 195-47: Seduction Service by Armand Coutot
- Midwood 195-48: Body To Body by Jory Sherman
- Midwood 195-49: Now I Lay Me by Mason Campbell
- Midwood 195-50: Lay-Away by George Myers
- Midwood 195-51: Out Of The Closet - Six Stories For Males by Michael Douglass
- Midwood 195-52: Straight In by P.D. Arthaz
- Midwood 195-53: The Way She Moves by Robert Evelyn
- Midwood 195-54: A Good Licking by J.J. Madison
- Midwood 195-55: Nookie by Jim Conaway
- Midwood 195-56: Lay-Over Stewardess by Anita Palmer
- Midwood 195-57: Full-Blown by Chris Harrison
- Midwood 195-58: Lust Trail by Craig Morris
- Midwood 195-59: Blue Nymph by Nancy Taggart
- Midwood 195-60: Thunderballs by Michael Packard
- Midwood 195-61: Pleasure Thrust by Bart Roscoe
- Midwood 195-62: Sex For Sale by Linda & Henry Commings
- Midwood 195-63: Hard-Core Love by J.J. Madison
- Midwood 195-64: Name Your Pleasure by Joyce Y.
- Midwood 195-65: Take It As It Comes by Michael Douglass
- Midwood 195-66: Lust Explosion by Molly McGuire
- Midwood 195-67: Skin Stroke by Samantha Ride
- Midwood 195-68: Teach Me by Shana Rae
- Midwood 195-69: Sheila's Sins by Gil Johns
- Midwood 195-70: Sex Shack by Delmas Abbott
- Midwood 195-71: Love Spurt by Linda DuBreuil
- Midwood 195-72: Bedtime Babysitter by Odda deLazzo
- Midwood 195-73: Mama's Little Girl by Mitchell Criterion
- Midwood 195-74: Family Circle by Robert Viktor
- Midwood 195-75: Sexual Fetishism by Dirk Malloy
- Midwood 195-76: Manhandled by Chris Harrison
- Midwood 195-77: Teacher's Pets by Matt Dorrance
- Midwood 195-78: Sweet Sensation by Jackie Ryan
- Midwood 195-79: Depraved Angel by Rosemary Santini
- Midwood 195-80: Private Performance by Micheal Enright
- Midwood 195-81: Willing Flesh by R. Lambert
- Midwood 195-82: A Mother's Lust by Brian West
- Midwood 195-83: Naked Ecstasy by Erica Black
- Midwood 195-84: Back-Door Lover by Kenneth Payne
- Midwood 195-85: Sisters In Sin by Gerald Kramer
- Midwood 195-86: A Lesbian's Lesson by Unknown
- Midwood 195-87: Cockeye by Onyx D'or
- Midwood 195-88: Farm Stud by Jackson Marsh
- Midwood 195-89: Brenda's Last Fling by Veronica King
- Midwood 195-90: Dirty Secrets by Max Nortic
- Midwood 195-91: Twisted Flesh by George Myers
- Midwood 195-92: The Professor's Naughty Wife by Robert Viktor
- Midwood 195-93: Woman Scent by Christopher Hunt
- Midwood 195-94: Pink Lips by Israel Krupp
- Midwood 195-95: A Beautiful Piece by James Miller
- Midwood 195-96: Deep And Warm by Jacque Etienne
- Midwood 195-97: A Little Lower... by Aldo Lucchesi
- Midwood 195-98: House Of Leather by Jim Conway
- Midwood 195-99: Hot Co-Ed by Leslie Hunter
- Midwood 195-100: Mommy's Sick Friends by Bobby Redding
- Midwood 195-101: Rita's Tongue by Jackson Marsh
- Midwood 195-102: My Strange Companion by Frederick W. Hammond
- Midwood 195-103: Hot Pants by Stan Lambert
- Midwood 195-104: Snatch by Israel Krupp
- Midwood 195-105: Oliver's Orgies by Emerald Evans
- Midwood 195-106: Campus Stud Lust by Tony McBride
- Midwood 195-107: Every Inch A Man by Michael Adrian
- Midwood 195-108: Flesh Session by Robin Townsend
- Midwood 195-109: Cheap Blonde by Don Elord
- Midwood 195-110: Thick And Throbbing by Cliff David
- Midwood 195-111: Lust's Diary by Ross Kennedy
- Midwood 195-112: Champion Stud by Michael Criterion
- Midwood 195-113: Flesh And Leather [aka 'Let's Go Lust'] by Simeon Morris
- Midwood 195-114: Between Joy's Legs by Baron Wells
- Midwood 195-115: Love Lips by Emerald Evans
- Midwood 195-116: Young Stuff by Gene Evans
- Midwood 195-117: Hot Gobs by Kenneth Payne
- Midwood 195-118: Shove It by Jud Marsh
- Midwood 195-119: Hard Rider by Conrad Grimes
- Midwood 195-120: Vicky Is Coming by Cheryl Wood
- Midwood 195-121: Big Blonde Swede by Jorge Valentine
- Midwood 195-122: The Size Of It by Jay Greene
- Midwood 195-123: From A Lesbian's Lips by Dallas Mayo
- Midwood 195-124: Summer-Camp Slut by Beth Harris
- Midwood 195-125: Every Last Drop by Alan Crawford
- Midwood 195-126: Family Fun [aka 'Sins Of Our Father'] by Kenneth Payne
- Midwood 195-127: A Brother's Lust by Emerald Evans
- Midwood 195-128: Teen-Age Tramps by Robert Evelyn
- Midwood 195-129: Hot And Raw by Jud Marsh
- Midwood 195-130: Sticky Pants by Arnold Pennington
- Midwood 195-131: Do Me Good by Stan Lambert
- Midwood 195-132: A Juicy Piece by Jon Mason
- Midwood 195-133: Hungry Women by James Oxford
- Midwood 195-134: A Clean And Decent Girl by China White
- Midwood 195-135: Vicky's Nasty Act by Dirk Malloy
- Midwood 195-136: The Boss' Wife by Ben Doughty
- Midwood 195-137: Just A Slut by Gerald Kramer
- Midwood 195-138: Hanging Low by Jay Ericson
- Midwood 195-139: Wayward Nymph by Gil Johns
- Midwood 195-140: Sweet Come by Guy Martin
- Midwood 195-141: Aunt Vera's Nephew by Israel Krupp
- Midwood 195-142: Spurt By Spurt by Jackie Powell
- Midwood 195-143: Filthy Paradise by Stan Lambert
- Midwood 195-144: Cherry Pink by Brian Summers
- Midwood 195-145: Pussy's Brother by Erik Hampden
- Midwood 195-146: Caged by Roger St. Clair
- Midwood 195-147: A Real Hot Number by Chris Simon
- Midwood 195-148: Squeeze Play by Jack Parker
- Midwood 195-149: Ruby's Tasty Pie by Michael Packard
- Midwood 195-150: Teen Bride by Don Elcord
- Midwood 195-151: Joy Ride by Lee Blase
- Midwood 195-152: Sweet Torture by Bud Cavalieri
- Midwood 195-153: Bonnie's Photo Sessions by Robert Evelyn
- Midwood 195-154: Straddle Me by J.J. Madison
- Midwood 195-155: Cheryl's Honeymoon by Guy Martin
- Midwood 195-156: Hot And Hard by Brian Summers

=== 60000 Series ===
- Midwood 60101: Ship Mates by Michael Adrian
- Midwood 60102: Nympho Beach by Ronnie Di Peitro
- Midwood 60103: Linda's Favorite Subject by Paul Rivers
- Midwood 60104: Debbie's Master by Mason Campbell
- Midwood 60105: Karen Goes Wild by Angela Scott
- Midwood 60106: Teacher Taught Us by Jon Vernon
- Midwood 60107: All Juiced Up by Veronica King
- Midwood 60108: Blue Love by Thomas Conrad
- Midwood 60109: Wanton Wife by Carolyn Shelby
- Midwood 60110: Runaway Teen Tramps by J. J. Madison
- Midwood 60111: Coed Slut Party by Bonnie Eaton
- Midwood 60112: Hitchhike "69" by Norm Philips
- Midwood 60113: Cruise Ship by Jay Greene
- Midwood 60114: Depraved Hippies by Mike Fisher
- Midwood 60115: Sleeping Around by Michael Adrian
- Midwood 60116: Silk Panties by George Simon
- Midwood 60117: Wet Lips by Robert Evelyn
- Midwood 60118: Sweet And Innocent by Debbie Wilcox
- Midwood 60119: Hard Rock Sex by Gary Jameson
- Midwood 60120: Hot Tongue Honey by Harvey Birch
- Midwood 60121: Wild Summer Sin by Dan Marks
- Midwood 60122: A Taste Of Pain by Jim Curry
- Midwood 60123: Skin Flick Chick by Tony McBride
- Midwood 60124: Hot Little Bitch by Veronica King
- Midwood 60125:
- Midwood 60126: Lesbian Obsession by Kimberly Kemp
- Midwood 60127: Patty's One Pleasure by Erik Hampden
- Midwood 60128: Degraded by Ricardo Santagata
- Midwood 60129: Jeff's Trade by Roger St. Clair
- Midwood 60130: Slut Ship by Michael Adrian
- Midwood 60131: Action Girl by Dallas Mayo
- Midwood 60132: Thrill Hungry by Norm Philips
- Midwood 60133: Dial Sex by Gil Johns
- Midwood 60134: A Coed Confession by Darlene Cassidy
- Midwood 60135: Nicole by Mark Lamont
- Midwood 60136: Ready And Willing by Raphael Sabato
- Midwood 60137: Sorority Sinners by Simeon Morris
- Midwood 60138: Bike Girl by Robert Moore
- Midwood 60138: Flesh Ritual by Christopher Laine
- Midwood 60139: Lori's Lesson by Sherry Berger
- Midwood 60140: Teacher's Pets by Matt Dorrance
- Midwood 60141: The Man Inside Me by Jay Greene
- Midwood 60142: Daddy's Playmates by Brad Duffield
- Midwood 60143: Coed! by June Curtiss
- Midwood 60144: Handy Man by Stan Myers
- Midwood 60145: Anxious To Please by Rob Morreale
- Midwood 60146: Pick-Up by Michael Adrian
- Midwood 60147: Down On The Farm by Brian Clemens
- Midwood 60148: The Insatiables by Guy Martin
- Midwood 60149: Blow By Blow by Jay Greene
- Midwood 60150: A Nest Of Lesbians by Dallas Mayo
- Midwood 60151: Swap Motel by Gerald Kramer
- Midwood 60152: Flesh Trade by Ricardo Santagata
- Midwood 60153: Summer Of '69 by Christopher Finley
- Midwood 60154: Nymph by Gil Johns
- Midwood 60155: Any Man Any Time by Michael Packard
- Midwood 60156: Voyeur's Delight by Alan Bell
- Midwood 60157: Naughty Rider by Max Vanallen
- Midwood 60158: Meet Marilyn by Thomas Cassidy
- Midwood 60159: Carnal Cousins by Jack Vaste
- Midwood 60160: Peggy Gets Hers by Stephen Morrison
- Midwood 60161: Kevin's Big Number by John Dell
- Midwood 60162: Reckless Flesh by Ben Doughty
- Midwood 60163: Flesh And Leather by Simeon Morris
- Midwood 60164: I Confess by Chris Harrison
- Midwood 60165: When She Was Bad… by Emerald Evans
- Midwood 60166: Miss Stuck-Up by Rob O'Neal
- Midwood 60167: Sheila's Sins by Gail Johns
- Midwood 60168: A Degrading Affair by Bert Phelan
- Midwood 60169: Come Again by Frederick Starr
- Midwood 60170: Sweet Lips by Fletcher Hill
- Midwood 60171: Hot And Tight by John C. Douglas
- Midwood 60172: After-School Swinger by Wesley Locke
- Midwood 60173: The Colonel's Boy by Jay Greene
- Midwood 60174: Syndicate Girl by Austin Barr
- Midwood 60175: Any Man's Daughter by Robert Wahl
- Midwood 60176: Camera Cuties by Ephram Lord
- Midwood 60177: Initiation To Sin by Ian Lederer
- Midwood 60178: Neighborhood Swap by Don Elcord
- Midwood 60179: Family Thrills by ?
- Midwood 60180: Sex-Circus Sisters by Jackie Vaste
- Midwood 60181: Bonnie's Dilemma by Don Elcord
- Midwood 60182: The Boss' Wife by Ben Doughty
- Midwood 60183: Squeeze Play by Jack Parker
- Midwood 60184: A Real Hot Number by Chris Simon
- Midwood 60185: My Brother, My Lover by Jay Greene
- Midwood 60186: Sensuous Showgirl by Preston Harriman
- Midwood 60187: Devoted Secretary by Duane Perkins
- Midwood 60188: Donna's Delight by Randy Hale
- Midwood 60189: Doctor Plays Dirty by Roy Battle
- Midwood 60190: Undercover Agent by Noland Lake
- Midwood 60191: Chico by Jay Greene
- Midwood 60192: Point Red by Veronica
- Midwood 60193: Midnight Trash by J.J. Madison
- Midwood 60194: Obedience by Mason Campbell
- Midwood 60195: Pucker Power by Robert Hadley
- Midwood 60196: Hot Flash by Robb Stanley
- Midwood 60197: Locker-Room Lovers by Vito Della Strada
- Midwood 60198: Sinful Sisters by Ricardo Santagata
- Midwood 60199: Captive Virgin by Hank Watson
- Midwood 60200: Lana Learns Fast by John Hoffer
- Midwood 60201: Kathy's Fling by Sherry Berger
- Midwood 60202: Party Doll by Stan Myers
- Midwood 60203: Girl in Heat by George Devlin
- Midwood 60204: Lust Trail by Craig Morris
- Midwood 60205: Lay-Away by George Myers
- Midwood 60206:
- Midwood 60207: Captives In the Chateau De Sade by John Cleve
- Midwood 60208:
- Midwood 60209:
- Midwood 60210: When Virtue Fails by Hardy Peters
- Midwood 60211: I Feel It Coming by Jay Greene
- Midwood 60212: Photo Orgy by Jack Parker
- Midwood 60213: Degraded Teenager by Vincent Church
- Midwood 60214:
- Midwood 60215: Paula's One Passion by Ralph Burgess
- Midwood 60216: Mafia Nympho by Johnnie Dio
- Midwood 60217:
- Midwood 60218: Man Hole by Chris Harrison
- Midwood 60219: Stud Ranch by Gus Stevens
- Midwood 60220: Mafia Mistress by Guy Martin
- Midwood 60221: Inferno Of Women by Ania Palmer
- Midwood 60222:
- Midwood 60223: French Job by Florence King
- Midwood 60224:
- Midwood 60225: Pretty Boys Must Die by Steven Zady
- Midwood 60226: My Secret Lesbian Life Volume I by Kimberly Kemp
- Midwood 60227:
- Midwood 60228:
- Midwood 60229: Sex School Mistress by Emerald Evans
- Midwood 60230: Baby Sister by Michael Packard
- Midwood 60231: Jocko's Kicks by Seth Bates
- Midwood 60232: Bare It [aka 'Bare It, Charity'] by Peter Quinn
- Midwood 60233: Lay-Over Stewardess by Anita Palmer
- Midwood 60234: Nookie by Jim Conaway
- Midwood 60235: Exotic Experiments by Robert Evelyn
- Midwood 60236: The Sinner by Robert Eli
- Midwood 60237: My Secret Lesbian Life Volume II by Kimberly Kemp
- Midwood 60238: Lust's Revenge by John Dell
- Midwood 60239: Honeymoon For Three by Seth Bates
- Midwood 60240: Weekend Swap by Todd Edmond
- Midwood 60241: Cheapest Girl In Town by Christopher Finley
- Midwood 60242: Call It Sin by Austin Barr
- Midwood 60243: Summer Of Shame by Vincent Church
- Midwood 60244: Strange Sisters by Peter Stanley
- Midwood 60245: Black Satin Sheets by Mike Winston
- Midwood 60246: Saint Of Lust - Memoirs Of A Delicate Woman by N.
- Midwood 60247: Sweet Seduction by Bret Steele
- Midwood 60248: Hot Line by Terry Fisher
- Midwood 60249: Silken Idol by Robert Moore
- Midwood 60250: Abby Opens Up by Andrew Laird
- Midwood 60251: Sugar by Emerald Evans
- Midwood 60252: Hot Pursuit by C.C. Banyon
- Midwood 60253: Doing Daddy by Samuel Sutton
- Midwood 60254: Wild by Vincent Church
- Midwood 60255: Willing Wanton by Gerald Kramer
- Midwood 60256: Vice Is Nice by Rob O'Neal
- Midwood 60257: White Goddess by Chris Harrison
- Midwood 60258: No Stopping Nancy by Edwin Mozler
- Midwood 60259: Learning From Lovers by Max Nortic
- Midwood 60260: Strong In The Saddle by Bret Steele
- Midwood 60261: High School Sinners by Geoffrey Ramdaggar
- Midwood 60262: Love Means Never Saying No by Brian Hartley
- Midwood 60263: Free And Easy by Robert Wahl
- Midwood 60264: Lesbians Unlimited by Dallas Mayo
- Midwood 60265: Hot Trail by Bret Steele
- Midwood 60266: Love Thy Brother by Ginger Craft
- Midwood 60267: Once In Love With Amy by Seth Bates
- Midwood 60268: Wild Cherry by John C. Douglas
- Midwood 60269: Doing It With Doctor [aka 'Doing It With Doc'] by Edwin Mozler
- Midwood 60270: Heat by Stan Shafer
- Midwood 60271: Teach Me, Teacher by Jackie Dalton
- Midwood 60272: Teen Tramp by Ricardo Santagata
- Midwood 60273: First One In by Robert Wahl
- Midwood 60274: Inside Eve by Todd Edmund
- Midwood 60275: Hot Wife by Roy Battle
- Midwood 60276: What Lana Learned by Geoffrey Ramdaggar
- Midwood 60277: Taking A Chance On Lust by Charles Hayes
- Midwood 60278: Special Services by Emerald Evans
- Midwood 60279: S As In Sensuous by John Denis
- Midwood 60280:
- Midwood 60281:
- Midwood 60282: Stolen Women by John Johnson
- Midwood 60283: Teaching Teacher by C.C. Banyon
- Midwood 60284: Virgin Territory by Seymour Harris
- Midwood 60285: Bush Country by Robert McAfee
- Midwood 60286: Affair by A.K. Devries
- Midwood 60287: Stolen Women by John Johnson
- Midwood 60288: The Mattress Game by Paul London
- Midwood 60289: Never Enough by John Denis
- Midwood 60290: Once Upon A Bed by Stan Shafer
- Midwood 60291: Lesbian On A Leash by Kimberly Kemp
- Midwood 60292: Sticky Fingers by Ricardo Santagata
- Midwood 60293: Plaything by Andrew Laird
- Midwood 60294: Everybody's Girl by Marc Antoine
- Midwood 60295: Sex Resort by Gerald Kramer
- Midwood 60296: Summer Heat by Chris Harrison
- Midwood 60297:
- Midwood 60298: Love Spurt by Linda Dubreuil
- Midwood 60299: Sheila by Preston Harriman
- Midwood 60300: The Pleasure Plan by Marc Antoine
- Midwood 60301: Brotherly Love by Annette Devin
- Midwood 60302: Lost Innocence by Amanda King
- Midwood 60303: Joy Journey by William Branch
- Midwood 60304: Three Way Love by Bronc Calloway
- Midwood 60305: Family Fun by Ginger Craft
- Midwood 60306: Tight Fit by John Denis
- Midwood 60307: Give Till It Hurts by Larry Hopkins
- Midwood 60308: Big Blonde Swede by Jorge Valentine
- Midwood 60309: Come One-Come All by Gerald Kramer
- Midwood 60310: Piece Meal by Dorsey Lang
- Midwood 60311: Sex Tool by Chris Harrison
- Midwood 60312: Wheel Of Lust by Justin George
- Midwood 60313: Lesbian Dollhouse by Dallas Mayo
- Midwood 60314: Mr. Stud by Michael Taber
- Midwood 60315: Sex Doctor by John Denis
- Midwood 60316: The Harem by Guy Le Duke
- Midwood 60317: Hot Sister by Brian Denny
- Midwood 60318: Tanya's Secret by Randy Ronson
- Midwood 60319: Code Name Gypsy Virgin [aka 'Gypsy Virgin'] by Max Nortic
- Midwood 60320: House Of Illusion by Mitchell Criterion
- Midwood 60321: Shared Beds by Marc Antoine
- Midwood 60322: The Dominators by Robert Moore
- Midwood 60323: Torrid by Norton McVickers
- Midwood 60324: French Trip by Robert Wahl
- Midwood 60325: Coming Alive by Collis Barker
- Midwood 60326: Sexualis 1984 by Geoffrey Ramdagger
- Midwood 60327: Captive Katie by A.K. Devries
- Midwood 60328: A Cunning Among Lesbians by Kimberly Kemp
- Midwood 60329: Family Nymph by ?
- Midwood 60330: Impatient Virgin by Andrew Laird
- Midwood 60331: The Professor's Naughty Wife by Robert Viktor
- Midwood 60332: Exposed by Burt Silver
- Midwood 60333: Lip Service by Roy Battle
- Midwood 60334: The Love Toy by Kieth Basso
- Midwood 60335: 5 Finger Exercise by Frank D. Reeve
- Midwood 60336: The Score by Collis Barker
- Midwood 60337: Beth's Private Lessons by Annette Devin
- Midwood 60338:
- Midwood 60339: Naked Caller by Randy Hale
- Midwood 60340: His Sister Taught Him by Robert McAfee
- Midwood 60341: Luscious by Paul Grant
- Midwood 60342: Ericka's Magic Touch by Jason Hytes
- Midwood 60343: Vicky Is Coming by Cheryl Wood
- Midwood 60344: Brenda's Last Fling by Veronica King
- Midwood 60345: Stephanie's Awakening by Carlton Lake
- Midwood 60346: Bitter Hunger by A.K. DeVries
- Midwood 60347: Society Tramp by Collis Barker
- Midwood 60348: Swappers Unlimited by George Devlin
- Midwood 60349: Savage Sinners by John Ellis
- Midwood 60350: Cherry Pink by Brian Summers
- Midwood 60351: Four Of A Kind by Jason Hytes
- Midwood 60352: Private Sessions by March Hastings
- Midwood 60353: White Thighs by Keith Basso
- Midwood 60354: The Flesh Is Willing by Frank D. Reeve
- Midwood 60355: Tempting Daddy by I. Smithson
- Midwood 60356: Twisted Flesh by George Myers
- Midwood 60357: Lessons In Lesbian Love by Dallas Mayo
- Midwood 60358: Greta by Jason Hytes
- Midwood 60359: Flesh Session by Robin Townsend
- Midwood 60360: NightWatch by Keith Basso
- Midwood 60361: The Mistress by Gerald Kramer
- Midwood 60362: Prisoner Of Pleasure by Brenda Piersall
- Midwood 60363: Two-Way Stretch by Claudia Cole
- Midwood 60364: Sweet Sinner by Frank D. Reeve
- Midwood 60365: The Outsiders by Robert Conrad
- Midwood 60366: The Hustler by Sloan Britain
- Midwood 60367: The Group by John Turner
- Midwood 60368: Her Secret Wife by Gerald Kramer
- Midwood 60369: Bad Girl In Town by George Devlin
- Midwood 60370: Rest In Piece by Linda Dubrueil
- Midwood 60371: Open House by Sloan Britain
- Midwood 60372: The Farmers Daughter by Dora Carl
- Midwood 60373: Honey by Max Nortic
- Midwood 60374: The Boss' Wife by Ben Doughty
- Midwood 60375: In Their Cups by Honey Potimkin
- Midwood 60376: Over-Developed by Jason Hytes
- Midwood 60377: Candylegs by Chris Harrison
- Midwood 60378: The Fluffy Girl by Dallas Mayo
- Midwood 60379: Carol by Dorsey Lang
- Midwood 60380: Waters Of Desire by Brad Curtiss
- Midwood 60381: Sister Nymphs by Dora Carl
- Midwood 60382: Vegas Virgins by Gus Stevens
- Midwood 60383: Heat Of Passion by Scott Morris
- Midwood 60384: Everybody's Darling by James Bennett
- Midwood 60385: Dark Desires by Jason Hytes
- Midwood 60386: Forced To Love by Robin Townsend
- Midwood 60387: The Hungry Years by George Devlin
- Midwood 60388: Voodoo Nights by Russell Smith
- Midwood 60389: The Horizontal Hours by Keith Basso
- Midwood 60390: A Pocketfull by Imo Yashima
- Midwood 60391: All He Wanted by Frank D. Reeve
- Midwood 60392: Silk Stockings by Carlton Lake
- Midwood 60393: The Yes Girl by Jerri Dugan
- Midwood 60394: Secrets by Dora Carl
- Midwood 60395: Girls School by Chris Harrison
- Midwood 60396: The Way We Are by Jason Hytes
- Midwood 60397: Girls In A Thousand Windows
- Midwood 60398: Trapped by Roy L. Couch
- Midwood 60399: Wild Child by Frank D. Reeve
- Midwood 60400: The Velvet Touch by Robert Hadley
- Midwood 60401: Kitten by Robert Moore
- Midwood 60402: The Arrangement by Robert Conrad
- Midwood 60403: Interlude by Frank D. Reeve
- Midwood 60404: R.S.V.P. by Jim Conway
- Midwood 60405:
- Midwood 60406: Play By Play by Collis Baker
- Midwood 60407: Just Whistle by Joseph Arrowsmith
- Midwood 60408: Miyoko's World by Imo Yashima
- Midwood 60409: Office Playmates by Dorsey Lang
- Midwood 60410: Begging To Love by A. K. Devries
- Midwood 60411: Coming Loose by Gerald Kramer
- Midwood 60412: Touch Of Venus by Kieth Basso
- Midwood 60413: Bedeviled by Russell Smith
- Midwood 60414: The Making Of Marianne by Frank D. Reeve
- Midwood 60415: Blue Nymph by Nancy Taggart
- Midwood 60416: Felicia by Tod Parker
- Midwood 60417: Reckless by Chris Harrison
- Midwood 60418: Love Doctor by Ralph Blasi
- Midwood 60419: Pool Of Loneliness by Dallas Mayo
- Midwood 60420: Sweet Lips by Joseph Arrowsmith
- Midwood 60421: Lovely Rogue by Thomas Morley
- Midwood 60422: Night & Day by Chris Harrison
- Midwood 60423: Hot Summer by Annette Devlin
- Midwood 60424:
- Midwood 60425: Shadows by Frank D. Reeve
- Midwood 60426: The Second Time Around by Keith Basso
- Midwood 60427: The Real Thing by Max Nortic
- Midwood 60428: Nashville Rebel by Carter Cash
- Midwood 60429: On The Road by Joseph Arrowsmith
- Midwood 60430: Golden Mermaid by Guy Martin
- Midwood 60431: Wife Next Door by George Devlin
- Midwood 60432: The Love Seekers by Gerald Kramer
- Midwood 60433: Her Magic Spell [aka 'On My Throbbing Engine'] by Jason Hytes
- Midwood 60434: Naked Stranger by Keith Basso
- Midwood 60435: Speak No Evil by Virgo
- Midwood 60436: Affair by A.K. Devries
- Midwood 60437: Suzy's Secret by Kirby Fuentes
- Midwood 60438: Southern Hospitality by Ray L. Couch
- Midwood 60439: Love Thy Neighbor by Jack Walker
- Midwood 60440: I Am Curious by Montgomery Popoff
- Midwood 60441: Touching by Robert Conrad
- Midwood 60442: Confidentially Yours Joanne by Keith Basso
- Midwood 60443: Moonglow [aka 'Night Of The Wolf'] by T.J. Flowers
- Midwood 60444: That Wonderful Need by Geoffrey Ramdagger
- Midwood 60445: Pretty Baby by Sloan Britain
- Midwood 60446: The Cheapest Thrill by Abbie Kaufmann
- Midwood 60447: Happy Hips by Dorsey Lang
- Midwood 60448: Girlstown by Dallas Mayo
- Midwood 60449: Teen Bride Adult by Don Elcord
- Midwood 60450: Isle Of Love by Dora Carl
- Midwood 60451: Try Me! by Dorsey Lang
- Midwood 60452: Pale Throat by Carlton Lake
- Midwood 60453: Soft Shoulders by John Denis
- Midwood 60454: Cloud Nine by Roy L. Couch
- Midwood 60455: Rosa's Way by Joseph Arrowsmith
- Midwood 60456: Route 69 by Chris Harrison
- Midwood 60457: Body Heat by Gerald Kramer
- Midwood 60458: So Bad by T.J. Flowers
- Midwood 60459: Pink Lips by Robert Conrad
- Midwood 60460: Indoor Sports by Jack Walker
- Midwood 60461: Busted by Dirk Rampart
- Midwood 60462: Tycoon by Delmas Abbott
- Midwood 60463: School For Scandal by Vince De Luca
- Midwood 60464: Obsession by H.M.
- Midwood 60465: Making Mary by Dora Carl
- Midwood 60466: Games by Jason Hytes
- Midwood 60467: Twisted by Chris Harrison
- Midwood 60468: Getting To Gloria by Gus Stevens
- Midwood 60469: Dial Me For Love by Bud Drake
- Midwood 60470: Danger - Soft Curve by Ted Kittering
- Midwood 60471: Angela by Russell Smith
- Midwood 60472: The Devil Made Me Do It by Guy Martin
- Midwood 60473: The Secret by Dallas Mayo
- Midwood 60474: Pillow Talk by Sloan Britain
- Midwood 60475: Moon Babies by Eric Jay
- Midwood 60476: Hard Rider by Conrad Grimes
- Midwood 60477: Open Kiss by Ivan Zummo
- Midwood 60478: Pick-Up by Joseph Arrowsmith
- Midwood 60479: Velvet Lips by Chris Harrison
- Midwood 60480: Three Ways To Love by Guy Martin
- Midwood 60481: So Soft by Ed Shaugnessy
- Midwood 60482: Another Day, Another Man by Chris Harrison
- Midwood 60483: Rock-A-Bye, Baby by George Shaw
- Midwood 60484: The Insatiables by Guy Martin
- Midwood 60485: The Big Ball by Marcus Pendanter
- Midwood 60486: Angel Of The Morning by James Miller
- Midwood 60487: Up And Coming by Bruce Elliot
- Midwood 60488: The Act Of Acts by Wade Graham
- Midwood 60489: Second-Hand Girl by Rona West
- Midwood 60490: Wild Honey by Dora Carl
- Midwood 60491: Part-Time Virgin by Jason Hytes
- Midwood 60492: Hanging Loose by Sloan Britain
- Midwood 60493: While The Cat's Away by Jack Walker
- Midwood 60494: Breakfast For Four by Chris Harrison
- Midwood 60495: The Action Girls by Rick Raymond
- Midwood 60496: Nymph by Dorsey Lang
- Midwood 60497: Juice Of Love by John Cleve
- Midwood 60498: The Mating by Eric Jay
- Midwood 60499: Sweet Lips by Fletcher Hill
- Midwood 60500: Any Man, Any Time by Michael Packard
- Midwood 60501: The Hit Man by Rafe Blasi
- Midwood 60502: Vibrations by Michael Doren
- Midwood 60503: She Loves It In The Country by Dorsey Lang
- Midwood 60504: Sables And Trash by Kirby Fuentes
- Midwood 60505: Delicious Nightmare by Dallas Mayo
- Midwood 60506: Golden Thighs by Carlton Lake
- Midwood 60507: Bad Sister by Roy Battle
- Midwood 60508: Pain & Pleasure by Chris Harrison
- Midwood 60509: Doctor's Girl by Ted Kittering
- Midwood 60510: The Hurry-Up Girl by Dora Carl
- Midwood 60511: Wild Summer by Dan Marks
- Midwood 60512:
- Midwood 60513: Shame by Guy Martin
- Midwood 60514: Prescription - Sex by James Dobbins
- Midwood 60515: Melissa by Dorsey Lang
- Midwood 60516: X-Rated Nurse by Keith Basso
- Midwood 60517: Family Secrets by Chris Harrison
- Midwood 60518: Night Game Girls by Kirby Fuentes
- Midwood 60519: Company Girls by Kirby Fuentes
- Midwood 60520: The Hungry Mouth by Russell Smith
- Midwood 60521: Quartette by Jonathon Quist
- Midwood 60522: Naughty Rider by Max Vanallen
- Midwood 60523: When She Was Bad by Emerald Evans
- Midwood 60524: Pucker Power by Robert Handley
- Midwood 60525: The Hello Kiss by Mason Tibbs
- Midwood 60526: Girl From Everywhere by Dora Carl
- Midwood 60527: The Jumpers by Joseph Arrowsmith
- Midwood 60528: Tarnished by Gus Stevens
- Midwood 60529: The Swingers by Ted Kittering
- Midwood 60530: Street People by Bud Drake
- Midwood 60531: Fly Me, I'm Eve by Chris Harrison
- Midwood 60532: Flesh And Leather [aka 'Let's Go Lust'] by Simeon Morris
- Midwood 60533: A Little Lower by Aldo Lucchesi
- Midwood 60534:
- Midwood 60535: Dirty Secrets by Max Nortic
- Midwood 60536: Cheap Blonde by Don Elord
- Midwood 60537: Careless Karen by Lloyd Veech
- Midwood 60538: His Sister, Nicole by Kirby Fuentes
- Midwood 60539: Hay Girl by Frank Henderson
- Midwood 60540: Never Too Much by Jack Walker
- Midwood 60541: Girl-Crazy Girl by Dallas Mayo
- Midwood 60542: Neighborly Affairs by Don Elcord
- Midwood 60543: Trapped by Stan Shafer
- Midwood 60544: Peggy Gets Hers by Stephen Morrison
- Midwood 60545: The Size Of It by Jay Greene
- Midwood 60546: Devil In The Flesh by Gloria Steinway
- Midwood 60547: Hot Pants by Stan Lambert
- Midwood 60548: Finger Man by Raphael de Santiago
- Midwood 60549: My Son, My Lover by Mason Tibbs
- Midwood 60550: Busy Beds by Scott Morris
- Midwood 60551: Open House by Guy Martin
- Midwood 60552: Love Wagon by Joseph Arrowsmith
- Midwood 60553: Delicious Tramp by Kirby Fuentes
- Midwood 60554: The Gay Girls by Carlton Lake
- Midwood 60555: Tender Flesh by Ted Kittering
- Midwood 60556: Playmates by Chris Harrison
- Midwood 60557: Blow Gently by Dallas Kovar
- Midwood 60558: Family Circle by Robert Victor
- Midwood 60559: Swap Motel by Gerald Kramer
- Midwood 60560: Private Performance by Michael Enright
- Midwood 60561: Silky by Dallas Mayo
- Midwood 60562: Come And Get It by Morgan Sears
- Midwood 60563: Runaway by Ted Kittering
- Midwood 60564: Never Enough by Sloan Britton
- Midwood 60565: Girl In The Red Bikini [aka 'Bikini Girl'] by George Devlin
- Midwood 60566: Private Boy [aka 'Nothing To It' or 'Her Private Boy'] by Raphael Blasi
- Midwood 60567: Teach Me by Chris Harrison
- Midwood 60568: Around The World by Bud Drake
- Midwood 60569: Locker-Room Lovers by Vito Della Strada
- Midwood 60570: Lust's Diary by Ross Kennedy
- Midwood 60571: Shove It by Jud Marsh
- Midwood 60572: Skin Flick Stud by Robert Hadley
- Midwood 60573: Darling Daughter by Joseph Arrowsmith
- Midwood 60574: Joy Ride by Will Rudd
- Midwood 60575: Executive Sweet by Jack Walker
- Midwood 60576: Hot Girl by ?
- Midwood 60577: Summer Love by Don Elcord
- Midwood 60578: Pick-Up by Dorsey Lang
- Midwood 60579: G-String Girl by Kirby Fuentes
- Midwood 60580: The Real Thing by James Charles
- Midwood 60581: Cockeye by Onyx D'Or
- Midwood 60582: Blue Nymph by Nancy Taggart
- Midwood 60583:
- Midwood 60584:
- Midwood 60585: Hot Pants Steno by Michael Jones
- Midwood 60586: The Kissing Whip by Dallas Mayo
- Midwood 60587: Water Sports by Joseph Arrowsmith
- Midwood 60588: Ladies In Heat by Roy Battle
- Midwood 60589: Tiger Girl by Guy Martin
- Midwood 60590: Pretty Boys by Steven Zady
- Midwood 60591: Incest Game by Ted Kittering
- Midwood 60592: Kinky Tramp by Chris Harrison
- Midwood 60593: Obedience by Mason Campbell
- Midwood 60594: Sex-Circus Sisters by Jack Vaste
- Midwood 60595: Hitchhike '69' by Norm Philips
- Midwood 60596: Farm Stud by Jackson Marsh
- Midwood 60597: Gang Bang by Joseph Arrowsmith
- Midwood 60598: Dr. Feelgood by Chris Harrison
- Midwood 60599: Flaky by Kirby Fluentes
- Midwood 60600: Young And Hot by Ginger Craft
- Midwood 60601: Mouth To Mouth by Jason Hyte
- Midwood 60602: French Ways by Bud Drake
- Midwood 60603: The Ultimate Sin by Walter Levereaux
- Midwood 60604: Hot-Tongue Honey by Harvey Birch
- Midwood 60605: Abby Opens Up by Andrew Laird
- Midwood 60606: Silken Idol by Robert Moore
- Midwood 60607: Boys In The Bed by Nick Stavros
- Midwood 60608: Lesbian Interlude by Dallas Mayo
- Midwood 60609: Go Down, Angel by Jeff Curry
- Midwood 60610: Sin Seminar by Michael Jones
- Midwood 60611: Taxi Tramps by Chris Harrison
- Midwood 60612: The Husband Taster by Don Elcord
- Midwood 60613: Chico by Jay Greene
- Midwood 60614: Hot And Tight by John C. Douglas
- Midwood 60615: A Degrading Affair by Bert Phelan
- Midwood 60616: Camera Cuties by Ephram Lord
- Midwood 60617: Lust Trail by Craig Morris
- Midwood 60618: Girl In Heat by George Devlin
- Midwood 60619: Squeeze Play by Jack Parker
- Midwood 60620: Carnal Cousins by Jack Vaste
- Midwood 60621: Pleasure Street by Joseph Arrowsmith
- Midwood 60622: Free Samples by Jack Walker
- Midwood 60623: Overripe by Ginger Craft
- Midwood 60624: Sex Kitten by Jason Hyte
- Midwood 60625: French Job by Florence King
- Midwood 60626: Flesh Trade by Ricardo Santagata
- Midwood 60627: Donna's Delight by Randy Hale
- Midwood 60628: Come Again by Frederick Starr
- Midwood 60629: Sorority Sinners by Simeon Morris
- Midwood 60630: Meet Marilyn by Thomas Cassidy
- Midwood 60631: Young Stuff by Gene Evans
- Midwood 60632: Hot And Raw by Jud Marsh
- Midwood 60633: Mail Order Sex by Del Marks
- Midwood 60634: Go-Go Boys by ?
- Midwood 60635: The Leather Game by Dora Carl
- Midwood 60636: Everybody's Girl by Joseph Arrowsmith
- Midwood 60637: Pussy's Brother by Erik Hampton
- Midwood 60638: A Good Licking by J.J. Madison
- Midwood 60639: After-School Swinger by Wesley Locke
- Midwood 60640: Hot Little Bitch by Veronica King
- Midwood 60641: Skin Flick Chick by Tony McBride
- Midwood 60642: Keyhole Kicks by Susan Ashley
- Midwood 60643: Three For Pain by Jack O. Stange
- Midwood 60644: Kiss Of The Lash by Kirby Fuentes
- Midwood 60645: Odd Girl by Terry Fisher
- Midwood 60646: For Women Only by Dallas Mayo
- Midwood 60647: Gay Exorcist by Michael Scott
- Midwood 60648: Nino by Jay Greene
- Midwood 60649: Sin Time by Kirby Fuentes
- Midwood 60650: Ride Me by Guy Martin
- Midwood 60651: Hospital Hustlers by Joseph Arrowsmith
- Midwood 60652: The Bisexuals by Jim Curry
- Midwood 60653: Kathy's Fling by Sherry Berger
- Midwood 60654: Down On The Farm by Brian Clemens
- Midwood 60655: Summer Of '69 by Christopher Finley
- Midwood 60656: A Real Hot Number by Chris Simon
- Midwood 60657: Daddy's Playmates by Brad Duffield
- Midwood 60658: Reckless Flesh by Ben Doughty
- Midwood 60659: Bondage by Geoffrey Reynolds
- Midwood 60660: The Leather Lovers by Chris Harrison
- Midwood 60661: Different - The Girls Of Summer by Arnold Evans
- Midwood 60662: Enraptured Lovers by March Hastings
- Midwood 60663: Gay Cruise by Michael Scott
- Midwood 60664: Black Hustler by Butch Temple
- Midwood 60665: Swinging by Jim Curry
- Midwood 60666: Slaves To Pain by Jack O. Strange
- Midwood 60667: The Virgin Game by Kirby Fuentes
- Midwood 60668: The Fetish Girls by Pat Aldrich
- Midwood 60669: Summer Sex by Jay Wood
- Midwood 60670: Shampoo Girl by Michael Jones
- Midwood 60671: Love Thy Brother by Ginger Craft
- Midwood 60672: Handy Man by Stan Myers
- Midwood 60673: Shared Beds by Marc Antoine
- Midwood 60674: Honeymoon For Three by Seth Bates
- Midwood 60675: Nymph by Gil Johns
- Midwood 60676: Virgin Territory by Seymour Harris
- Midwood 60677: Gay Bikers by Michael Scott
- Midwood 60678: More by Jay Greene
- Midwood 60679: So Strange A Love by I.D. Sherwood
- Midwood 60680: Women by Terry Fisher
- Midwood 60681: Princess Of Pain by Bill Harris
- Midwood 60682:
- Midwood 60683: Lessons In Lust by Jay Wood
- Midwood 60684: Super-Stud by Geoffrey Reynolds
- Midwood 60685: Massage Sensation by Roy Tilman
- Midwood 60686: Practice Does It by John Clayton
- Midwood 60687: Free And Easy by Ephram Lord
- Midwood 60688: Three Way Love by Bronc Calloway
- Midwood 60689: Hot Trail by Bret Steele
- Midwood 60690: Tanya's Secret by Randy Ronson
- Midwood 60691: Doing Daddy by Samuel Sutton
- Midwood 60692: Bike Girl by Robert Moore
- Midwood 60693: Her Woman's World by Terry Fisher
- Midwood 60694: Two Wives' Pleasure by Maria Amore
- Midwood 60695: Gay Street Twins by Beau Jeffries
- Midwood 60696: Private Passions by Michael Scott
- Midwood 60697: X-Rated Virgin by Stan Shafer
- Midwood 60698: Sex Before Six by Michael Doren
- Midwood 60699: Willing Thighs by Bill Harris
- Midwood 60700: The Peepers by Dennis Roberts
- Midwood 60701: Hungry Wives by Guy Sanders
- Midwood 60702: Honey Bear by Jack Adams
- Midwood 60703: Call It Sin by Austin Barr
- Midwood 60704: Cherry Pink by Brian Summers
- Midwood 60705: Weekend Swap by Todd Edmund
- Midwood 60706: Summer Of Shame by Vincent Church
- Midwood 60707: Teen Tramp by Ricardo Santagata
- Midwood 60708: Willing Wanton by Gerald Kramer
- Midwood 60709: Slaves & Masters [aka 'Slaves And Masters'] by Tom Hartman
- Midwood 60710: Leather Fist by Hal Halstead
- Midwood 60711: Lesbian Slave by Lee Garimond
- Midwood 60712: Hot Line by Terry Fisher
- Midwood 60713:
- Midwood 60714: Hotel Lust by Lee Server
- Midwood 60715: Gay Psycho by Michael Scott
- Midwood 60716: Sleep-In Women by Kirby Fuentes
- Midwood 60717: Leather Cycle by Jack Walker
- Midwood 60718: Gay Women by Maria Amore
- Midwood 60719: Willing Flesh by R. Lambert
- Midwood 60720: Voyeur's Delight by Alan Bell
- Midwood 60721: Ski-Lodge Weekend by Bob Schreiber
- Midwood 60722: Ripe by Nelson Bayne
- Midwood 60723:
- Midwood 60724: Sex Tool by Chris Harrison
- Midwood 60725: Neighborhood Swap by Don Elcord
- Midwood 60726: Lip Service by Roy Battle
- Midwood 60727: Bare It, Charity [aka 'Bare It'] by Peter Quinn
- Midwood 60728: Shame On Charlotte by Preston Harriman
- Midwood 60729: Girl Cop by Kirby Fuentes
- Midwood 60730: Secrets Of Olympic Village by Susan Ashley
- Midwood 60731: Woman On Top by I. D. Sherwood
- Midwood 60732: Panty Thief by Will Rudd
- Midwood 60733: The Gay Kidnappers by Butch Temple
- Midwood 60734: Funland by Robert V. Woodward
- Midwood 60735: Wild Cherry by John C. Douglas
- Midwood 60736: Torrid by Norton McVickers
- Midwood 60737: Strange Sisters by Peter Stanley
- Midwood 60738: Doing It With Doc [aka 'Doing It With Doctor'] by Edwin Mozler
- Midwood 60739: Love Spurt by Linda Dubreuil
- Midwood 60740: Tight Fit by John Denis
- Midwood 60741: Hot Pursuit by C.C. Banyon
- Midwood 60742: Joy Journey by William Branch
- Midwood 60743: Piece Meal by Dorsey Lang
- Midwood 60744: Cheapest Girl In Town by Christopher Finley
- Midwood 60745: Body Shop by Butch Temple
- Midwood 60746: Soft Touch by Dallas Mayo
- Midwood 60747: Centerfold Girl by Jim Curry
- Midwood 60748: Teach Me Gang-Bang Girl by Chris Harrison
- Midwood 60749:
- Midwood 60750: High School Hustlers by Jay Greene
- Midwood 60751: Heat by Stan Shafer
- Midwood 60752: Paula's Passion by Ralph Burgess
- Midwood 60753: Wheel Of Lust by Justin George
- Midwood 60754: Sensuous Showgirl by Preston Harriman
- Midwood 60755: Pick-Up: Call Him Anytime by Michael Adrian
- Midwood 60756: Prisoner Of Pleasure by Brenda Piersall
- Midwood 60757: Search For Brutality by Jason Hytes
- Midwood 60758: Daddy's Darling by Todd Edmund
- Midwood 60759: Naked Caller by Randy Hale
- Midwood 60760: Exposed by Burt Silver
- Midwood 60761: Lady Sings The Hots by Dorsey Lang
- Midwood 60762: Raunchy Rio by Jim Curry
- Midwood 60763: Contract For Lust by Michael Doren
- Midwood 60764: Lights Out by Lee Server
- Midwood 60765: Behind These Walls by Jay Greene
- Midwood 60766: Lollipop Girl by Chris Harrison
- Midwood 60767: Sweet And Innocent by Debbie Wilcox
- Midwood 60768: His Sister Taught Him by Robert Mcafee
- Midwood 60769: The Harem by Guy Le Duke
- Midwood 60770: Once Upon A Bed by Stan Shafer
- Midwood 60771: Erica's Magic Touch by Jason Hytes
- Midwood 60772: Strong In The Saddle by Bret Steele
- Midwood 60773: Pussy Island by John Cleve
- Midwood 60774: Silk Panties by George Simon
- Midwood 60775: Vice Is Nice by Rob O'Neal
- Midwood 60776: Unlike Others by Valerie Taylor
- Midwood 60777: Swinging Cop by Bud Drake
- Midwood 60778: Swing Gypsy - When the Chorus Line Drops Their G-Strings by Jim Curry
- Midwood 60779: Pain For Profit by Jack O. Stange
- Midwood 60780: Sweet Cream by Dallas Mayo
- Midwood 60781: Dark Horse Stud by Bud Drake
- Midwood 60782: The Flasher by Kirby Fuentes
- Midwood 60783: French Trip by Robert Wahl
- Midwood 60784: The Mattress Game by Paul London
- Midwood 60785: Photo Orgy by Jack Parker
- Midwood 60786: Losing It by John Denis
- Midwood 60787: I Confess by Chris Harrison
- Midwood 60788:
- Midwood 60789: Plaything by Andrew Laird
- Midwood 60790: Syndicate Girl by Austin Barr
- Midwood 60791: Sweet Seduction by Bret Steele
- Midwood 60792: Learning From Lovers by Max Nortic
- Midwood 60793: Travelin' Stud by Lee Server
- Midwood 60794: Funland by Robert V. Woodward
- Midwood 60795: The Roman Way by Rose Kaplin
- Midwood 60796: Country Hustler by Jim Curry
- Midwood 60797: Peeping Tom by Jason Hytes
- Midwood 60798: Caged by Roger St. Clair
- Midwood 60799: Soft And Warm by Terry Fisher
- Midwood 60800: Wild by Vincent Church
- Midwood 60801: Captive Katie by A.K. Devries
- Midwood 60802: No Stopping Nancy by Edwin Mozzler
- Midwood 60803: Wet Lips by Robert Evelyn
- Midwood 60804: Impatient Virgin by Andrew Laird
- Midwood 60805: Hot Sister by Brian Denny
- Midwood 60806: High School Sinners by Godfrey Ramdagger
- Midwood 60807: Lost Innocence by Amanda King
- Midwood 60808: The Dominators by Robert Moore
- Midwood 60809: Blue Movie Girl by Jim Curry
- Midwood 60810: Honky-Tonk Girl by J. Holbrook
- Midwood 60811: Snow Bunny by Kirby Fuentes
- Midwood 60812: Groupies by Michael Scott
- Midwood 60813: The Casting Couch by Butch Temple
- Midwood 60814: Disco Lust by Bud Drake
- Midwood 60815: Inside Eve by Todd Edmund
- Midwood 60816:
- Midwood 60817: Degraded Teenager by Vincent Church
- Midwood 60818:
- Midwood 60819: Deep And Warm by Jacques Etienne
- Midwood 60820: Captive Virgin by Hank Watson
- Midwood 60821:
- Midwood 60822: Bonnie's Dilemma by Don Elcord
- Midwood 60823: Party Doll by Stan Myers
- Midwood 60824: Lay-Away by George Myers
- Midwood 60825: Live-In Lover by Lee Server
- Midwood 60826: The Girl From Capitol Hill by Jim Curry
- Midwood 60827: Easy Entry by Joseph Arrowsmith
- Midwood 60828:
- Midwood 60829: Grabbing It by Del Marks
- Midwood 60830: Women's Ecstasy by Dallas Mayo
- Midwood 60831: Too Hot To Care by Roy Battle
- Midwood 60832: Eager Nympho by Kirby Fuentes
- Midwood 60833: Sticky Pants by Arnold Pennington
- Midwood 60834: Coed Slut Party by Bonnie Eaton
- Midwood 60835: Waters Of Desire by Brad Curtis
- Midwood 60836: Blue Love by Thomas Conrad
- Midwood 60837: Filthy Paradise by Stan Lambert
- Midwood 60838: Bonnie's Photo Sessions by Robert Evelyn
- Midwood 60839: Spurt By Spurt by Jackie Powell
- Midwood 60840: Anxious To Please by Rob Morreale
- Midwood 60841: Hot Legs by Tanya Sweet
- Midwood 60842: Stacked by Will Rudd
- Midwood 60843: Sweet Betsy by Stan Shafer
- Midwood 60844: Turned On Nympho by Joseph Arrowsmith
- Midwood 60845: Singles' Bar by Jim Curry
- Midwood 60846: Willing Housewives by Del Marks
- Midwood 60847: Coming On Hard by Steven Zady
- Midwood 60848: Massage Girl by Jay Wood
- Midwood 60849: Private Sessions by March Hastings
- Midwood 60850: Four Of A Kind by Jason Hytes
- Midwood 60851:
- Midwood 60852: Once In Love With Amy by Seth Bates
- Midwood 60853:
- Midwood 60854: Swappers Unlimited by George Devlin
- Midwood 60855: Two-Way Stretch by Claudia Cole
- Midwood 60856: Flesh Ritual by Christopher Laine
- Midwood 60857: Girl On The Loose by Lee Server
- Midwood 60858: Head Fever by Jay Wood
- Midwood 60859: Swedish Sinners by Micael Scott
- Midwood 60860: Pleasure Buyers by Joseph Arrowsmith
- Midwood 60861: Kid Sister Makes Out by Roy Battle
- Midwood 60862: Pleasing Jessica by Jack Walker
- Midwood 60863: The Outsiders by Robert Conrad
- Midwood 60864: Give Till It Hurts by Larry Hopkins
- Midwood 60865:
- Midwood 60866: The Hustler by Sloan Britain
- Midwood 60867: Greta by Jason Hytes
- Midwood 60868: Luscious by Paul Grant
- Midwood 60869: Beth's Private Lessons by Annette Devlin
- Midwood 60870: The Group by John Turner
- Midwood 60871:
- Midwood 60872: Mr. Stud by Michael Taber
- Midwood 60873: Summer Camp by Jason Hyte
- Midwood 60874:
- Midwood 60875: Wildcat by Dora Carl
- Midwood 60876:
- Midwood 60877:
- Midwood 60878: Housewife Hooker by Michael Scott
- Midwood 60879: Love Doctor by Ralph Blasi
- Midwood 60880: Every Inch A Man by Michael Adrian
- Midwood 60881: Party Doll by Stan Myers
- Midwood 60882: Carol by Dorsey Lang
- Midwood 60883: Silky by Joseph Arrowsmith
- Midwood 60884: Sinful Sisters by Richard Santagata
- Midwood 60885: Bush Country by Robert McAfee
- Midwood 60886: Hot Wife by Roy Battle
- Midwood 60887: A Beautiful Piece by James Miller
- Midwood 60888: Undercover Agent by Noland Lake
- Midwood 60889: Stroking by Lee Server
- Midwood 60890: Love-In by Michael Scott
- Midwood 60891: Sex On Credit by Don Starr
- Midwood 60892: Hot Twins by Max Richards
- Midwood 60893: Family Bride by Stan Shafer
- Midwood 60894: Massage Parlor by Del Marks
- Midwood 60895: Over-Developed by Jason Hytes
- Midwood 60896: Bad Girl In Town by George Devlin
- Midwood 60897: Bike Girl by Robert Moore
- Midwood 60898: Route 69 by Chris Harrison
- Midwood 60899: What's Up? by Chuck Watts
- Midwood 60900: Coed by June Curtiss
- Midwood 60901: Jocko's Kicks by Seth Bates
- Midwood 60902: Lesbian Dollhouse by Dallas Mayo
- Midwood 60903: Gina Gives In by Todd Edmund
- Midwood 60904: The Farmer's Daughter by Dora Carl
- Midwood 60905: Small Town Secrets by Del Marks
- Midwood 60906: Night Rider by Jim Curry
- Midwood 60907: Summer Sex by Jack O. Stange
- Midwood 60908: Out Of Control by Jay Wood
- Midwood 60909: We Two by Dallas Mayo
- Midwood 60910: The Private Life Of A Beauty Queen by Lee Server
- Midwood 60911: Rosa's Way by Joseph Arrowsmith
- Midwood 60912: Silk Stockings by Carlton Lake
- Midwood 60913: Sister Nymphs by Dora Carl
- Midwood 60914: The Arrangement by Robert Conrad
- Midwood 60915: Sticky Fingers by Richard Santagata
- Midwood 60916: Heat Of Passion by Scott Morris
- Midwood 60917: Trapped by Roy L. Couch
- Midwood 60918: Mikoyo's World by Imo Yashima
- Midwood 60919: Joy Ride by Lee Blase
- Midwood 60920: The Way We Are by Jason Hytes
- Midwood 60921: Snap Me, I'm Yours by Rose Darling
- Midwood 60922: Superstar Sex by Don Starr
- Midwood 60923: Sex - Southern Style by Roy Battle
- Midwood 60924: French Love by Dora Carl
- Midwood 60925: Play With Me by Jane Ross
- Midwood 60926: File Under 'Passion' by Michael Doren
- Midwood 60927: Southern Hospitality by Ray L. Couch
- Midwood 60928: Suzy's Secrets by Kirby Fuentes
- Midwood 60929: Love Thy Neighbor by Jack Walker
- Midwood 60930: Pool Of Loneliness by Dallas Mayo
- Midwood 60931: Golden Mermaid by Guy Martin
- Midwood 60932: Ripoff by Robert Conrad
- Midwood 60933: On The Road by Joseph Arrowsmith
- Midwood 60934: Wife Next Door by George Devlin
- Midwood 60935: That Wonderful Need [aka 'Seductive Reasoning'] by Geoffrey Ramdagger
- Midwood 60936: Happy Hips by Dorsey Lang
- Midwood 60937: Hot Co-Ed by Roy Battle
- Midwood 60938: Hungry Wife by Steven Zady
- Midwood 60939: The Mistress by Lee Server
- Midwood 60940: Campus Love-In by Margo Peters
- Midwood 60941: Flying by Jim Curry
- Midwood 60942: Deep Thrust by Del Marks
- Midwood 60943: Never Say "No" by Jay Wood
- Midwood 60944: Pale Throat by Carlton Lake
- Midwood 60945: Office Playmates by Dorsey Lang
- Midwood 60946: Just Whistle by Joseph Arrowsmith
- Midwood 60947:
- Midwood 60948: Begging To Love by A. K. DeVries
- Midwood 60949: Turning On by Ray L. Couch
- Midwood 60950: The Fluffy Girl by Dallas Mayo
- Midwood 60951: The Love Seekers by Gerald Kramer
- Midwood 60952: Lovely Rogue by Thomas Morely
- Midwood 60953: Teenage Beach Bunny by Del Marks
- Midwood 60954: Bed Fun - Country Style by Dora Carl
- Midwood 60955: Jezebels by Robert Wahl
- Midwood 60956: Country Club Capers by Jim Curry
- Midwood 60957: Fetish Paradise by Lee Server
- Midwood 60958: Topless Virgin by Michael Doren
- Midwood 60959: Dial Me For Love by Bud Drake
- Midwood 60960: Pink Lips by Robert Conrad
- Midwood 60961: Cloud Nine by Roy L. Couch
- Midwood 60962: Touching by Robert Conrad
- Midwood 60963: Soft Shoulders by John Denis
- Midwood 60964: Getting To Gloria by Gus Stevens
- Midwood 60965: The Devil Made Me Do It by Guy Martin
- Midwood 60966: Indoor Sports by Jack Walker
- Midwood 60967: Nude Beauty by Merry Wood
- Midwood 60968: Try Me by Dorsey Lang
- Midwood 60969: Disco Heat by Jim Curry
- Midwood 60970: The Sex Spa by Del Marks
- Midwood 60971: Schoolmates by Dallas Mayo
- Midwood 60972: Sharing by Jay Wood
- Midwood 60973: Hot Shampoo by Joseph Arrowsmith
- Midwood 60974: Patty's One Pleasure by Erik Hampden
- Midwood 60975: Naked Ecstasy by Erica Black
- Midwood 60976: Breaking Loose by Guy Martin
- Midwood 60977: Call Girls' Doctor by Erik Hampden
- Midwood 60978: Sleeping Around by Marshall Jacks
- Midwood 60979: Campus Lust by Tony McBride
- Midwood 60980: Open Kiss by Ivan Zummo
- Midwood 60981: Joy's Orgy Team by B. Wells
- Midwood 60982: Bad Sister by Roy Battle
- Midwood 60983: So Tight by Jason Hytes
- Midwood 60984: The Hot Hostage by Dora Carl
- Midwood 60985: Point Red by Veronica
- Midwood 60986: Mommy's Sick Friends by B. Redding
- Midwood 60987: Shared Beds by Marc Antoine
- Midwood 60988: Possession by Frederick Bailey
- Midwood 60989: Making Mary by Dora Carl
- Midwood 60990: Three Ways To Love by Guy Martin
- Midwood 60991: Aunt Vera's Nephew by I. Krupp
- Midwood 60992:
- Midwood 60993: Girlstown by Dallas Mayo
- Midwood 60994: Body Heat by Gerald Kramer
- Midwood 60995: Pleasure's Their Business by March Hastings
- Midwood 60996: Numpho On The Run by Brenda Curtiss
- Midwood 60997: Senor Rogue by Ramon
- Midwood 60998: Action Girls by Floyd Smith
- Midwood 60999: Special Tastes by Jim Curry
- Midwood 61000: Wife Swappers' Paradise by Ivan Zummo
- Midwood 61001: Coming Loose by Gerald Kramer
- Midwood 61002: Shame by Guy Martin
- Midwood 61003: The Secret by Dallas Mayo
- Midwood 61004: Quartette by Jonathon Quist
- Midwood 61005: Rock-A-Bye, Baby by George Shaw
- Midwood 61006: Slow Burn by Marcus Pendanter
- Midwood 61007: Pretty Baby by Sloan Britain
- Midwood 61008: Sables & Trash by Kirby Fuentes
- Midwood 61009: Vibrations by Michael Doren
- Midwood 61010: Dark Desires by Jason Hytes
- Midwood 61011: Teacher's Pets by Matt Dorrance
- Midwood 61012: So Soft by Ed Shaugnessy
- Midwood 61013: Pillow Talk by Sloan Brittain
- Midwood 61014: Wild Honey by Dora Carl
- Midwood 61015:
- Midwood 61016: Savage Sinners by John Ellis
- Midwood 61017: Tuned Up by Roy Battle
- Midwood 61018: Ski Lodge Nymphet by Joseph Arrowsmith
- Midwood 61019: Live-In Teacher by Jack O. Stange
- Midwood 61020:
- Midwood 61021: Scoring by Michael Kaye
- Midwood 61022: CB Lust by Stan Shafer
- Midwood 61023: Delicious Nightmare by Dallas Mayo
- Midwood 61024: Doctor's Girl by Ted Kittering
- Midwood 61025: Prescription: Sex by James W. Dobbins
- Midwood 61026: The Hit Man Target: Women by Rafe Blasi
- Midwood 61027: Melissa by Dorsey Lang
- Midwood 61028: Company Girls by Kirby Fuentes
- Midwood 61029: Play By Play by Collis Barker
- Midwood 61030: The Hurry-Up Girl by Dora Carl
- Midwood 61031:
- Midwood 61032: While The Cat's Away by Jack Walker
- Midwood 61033: The Hostage Mistress by Lee Server
- Midwood 61034: Playgirl by Michael Scott
- Midwood 61035: Rich Bitch by Dora Carl
- Midwood 61036: Dyana's Love Cult by Doris Holliday
- Midwood 61037: Married Nympho by Robert Wahl
- Midwood 61038: Country Fever by Jim Curry
- Midwood 61039: Love Lessons by Del Marks
- Midwood 61040: Cherry Busters by Jack Walker
- Midwood 61041: Golden Thighs by Carlton Lake
- Midwood 61042: Street People by Bud Drake
- Midwood 61043: A Nest Of Lesbians by Dallas Mayo
- Midwood 61044: Nymph by Dorsey Lang
- Midwood 61045: Night Game Girls [aka 'The Rookie's Wife'] by Ted Kittering
- Midwood 61046: Tempting Daddy by I. Smithson
- Midwood 61047: Sheila by Preston Harriman
- Midwood 61048: Pleasure Plan by Marc Antoine
- Midwood 61049: Housewife Tramps by Del Marks
- Midwood 61050: Woman Bait by Michael Doren
- Midwood 61051: Hot Vibes by Dora Carl
- Midwood 61052: Casting Couch by Doris Holliday
- Midwood 61053: Search For Passion by Roy Battle
- Midwood 61054: Teenage Lust by Jay Wood
- Midwood 61055: Swinging Nurse by Max Richards
- Midwood 61056: Lesbians In Hard Hats by Michael Scott
- Midwood 61057:
- Midwood 61058: Neighborly Affairs by Don Elcord
- Midwood 61059: Tarnished by Gus Stevens
- Midwood 61060: Careless Karen by Lloyd Veech
- Midwood 61061: The Jumpers by Joseph Arrowsmith
- Midwood 61062: His Sister Nicole by Kirby Fuentes
- Midwood 61063: Miss Stuck-Up by Rob O'Neal
- Midwood 61064: Never Too Much by Jack Walker
- Midwood 61065: Special Service by Jim Curry
- Midwood 61066: Suburban Sin by Jack O. Strange
- Midwood 61067: The Mexican Way by Jay Wood
- Midwood 61068:
- Midwood 61069: The X-Rated Teacher by Dorsey Lang
- Midwood 61070: Hot Swede by Lee Server
- Midwood 61071: Honey Pot by Tommie Reed
- Midwood 61072: My Son My Lover by Mason Tibbs
- Midwood 61073: Forced To Love by Robin Townsend
- Midwood 61074: Affair by A.K. DeVries
- Midwood 61075: Everybody's Darling by James Bennett
- Midwood 61076: Pick-Up by Joseph Arrowsmith
- Midwood 61077: Heat Of Passion by Scott Morris
- Midwood 61078:
- Midwood 61079: Cheap Blonde by Don Elcord
- Midwood 61080: Come Again by Frederick Starr
- Midwood 61081: Cherry Hunter by Jim Curry
- Midwood 61082: Hot To Trot by Rose Darling
- Midwood 61083: Busy Beds by Scott Morris
- Midwood 61084: Fetish Girl by Doris Holliday
- Midwood 61085: Ava's Box by Jay Wood
- Midwood 61086: Hot Server by Michael Doren
- Midwood 61087: Family Circle by Robert Victor
- Midwood 61088: Sex Injection by Roy Battle
- Midwood 61089:
- Midwood 61090: Open House by Guy Martin
- Midwood 61091:
- Midwood 61092: The Gay Girls by Carlton Lake
- Midwood 61093: Tender Flesh by Ted Kittering
- Midwood 61094: Love Wagon by Joseph Arrowsmith
- Midwood 61095: Hay Girl by Frank Henderson
- Midwood 61096: In Their Cups by Honey Potimkin
- Midwood 61097: Sex Toys by Lee Server
- Midwood 61098: Love Bud by Michael Scott
- Midwood 61099: Lust Encounter by Jay Wood
- Midwood 61100: Jet Set by Doris Holliday
- Midwood 61101: Highway Hustlers by Robert Wahl
- Midwood 61102: Loose Lady by Del Marks
- Midwood 61103: Flesh Explosion by Reg Bryant
- Midwood 61104: The Virgin Game by Kirby Fuentes
- Midwood 61105: Slut Ship by Michael Adrian
- Midwood 61106: Wild Summer by Dan Marks
- Midwood 61107: Runaway by Ted Kittering
- Midwood 61108: Nashville Rebel by Carter Cash
- Midwood 61109:
- Midwood 61110: Come And Get It by Morgan Sears
- Midwood 61111: Girl-Crazy Girl by Dallas Mayo
- Midwood 61112: Bikini Girl [aka 'Girl in the Red Bikini'] by George Devlin
- Midwood 61113: Eager Virgin by Micael Doren
- Midwood 61114: Anything Goes by Curt Peterson
- Midwood 61115: Three's Company by Joseph Arrowsmith
- Midwood 61116: Laverne's Fire Island 'Party' by Doris Holliday
- Midwood 61117: Cheaters by Rose Darling
- Midwood 61118: Hot Stewardess by Roy Battle
- Midwood 61119: Flesh Carnival by Jim Curry
- Midwood 61120: Housewife Hustlers by Jay Wood
- Midwood 61121: Around The World by Bud Drake
- Midwood 61122:
- Midwood 61123: Joy Ride by Will Rudd
- Midwood 61124: Devil In The Flesh by Gloria Steinway
- Midwood 61125: Executive Sweet by Jack Walker
- Midwood 61126: Brenda's Summer Love by Don Elcord
- Midwood 61127: Any Man's Daughter by Robert Wahl
- Midwood 61128: Hot Little Bitch by Veronica King
- Midwood 61129: Joanie by Michael Doren
- Midwood 61130: Sex Kitten by Jack O. Stange
- Midwood 61131: One Girl's Lust by Michael Dean
- Midwood 61132: Christine's Savage Passion by Doris Holliday
- Midwood 61133: Pleasure Thrust by Reg Bryant
- Midwood 61134: Beach Baby by Joseph Arrowsmith
- Midwood 61135: Blonde Vixen by George Devlin
- Midwood 61136: Carol's Sex Fever by Jay Wood
- Midwood 61137: Sin Time by Kirby Fuentes
- Midwood 61138: Darling Daughter by Joseph Arrowsmith
- Midwood 61139: The Real Thing by James Charles
- Midwood 61140: For Women Only by Dallas Mayo
- Midwood 61141:
- Midwood 61142: Hot Pants Steno by Michael Jones
- Midwood 61143: Family Secrets by Chris Harrison
- Midwood 61144: Tiger Girl by Guy Martin
- Midwood 61145: Strange Trio by Michael Doren
- Midwood 61146: Kinky Secrets by Michael Scott
- Midwood 61147: Everybody's Virgin by Debbie Ray
- Midwood 61148: First Time Swingers by Roy Battle
- Midwood 61149: High Flier by Jay Wood
- Midwood 61150: Cathy's Passion by Robert Wahl
- Midwood 61151: Bedroom Business by Reg Bryant
- Midwood 61152: Route 69 by Harry Logan
- Midwood 61153: Go Down, Angel by Jim Curry
- Midwood 61154: The Husband Taster by Don Elcord
- Midwood 61155: Taxi Tramps by Chris Harrison
- Midwood 61156: Pleasure Street by Joseph Arrowsmith
- Midwood 61157: I Will Return And Claim My Bed by Max Nortic
- Midwood 61158: Overripe by Ginger Craft
- Midwood 61159: Sex Kitten by Jason Hyte
- Midwood 61160: G-String Girl by Kirby Fuentes
- Midwood 61161: Love Feast by Michael Doren
- Midwood 61162: Give It To Me by Del Marks
- Midwood 61163: Bustin' Out by Lee Server
- Midwood 61164: Leona's Lust by Doris Holliday
- Midwood 61165:
- Midwood 61166: Sex Ranch by Richard Lane
- Midwood 61167: Sweet And Innocent by Reg Bryant
- Midwood 61168:
- Midwood 61169: French Ways by Bud Drake
- Midwood 61170: Ladies In Heat by Roy Battle
- Midwood 61171: Mouth To Mouth by Jason Hyte
- Midwood 61172: Kinky Tramp by Chris Harrison
- Midwood 61173: Lessons In Lesbian Love by Dallas Mayo
- Midwood 61174: Young & Hot by Ginger Craft
- Midwood 61175: Teach Me by Chris Harrison
- Midwood 61176: Water Sports by Joseph Arrowsmith
- Midwood 61177: Lust by Michael Doren
- Midwood 61178:
- Midwood 61179: Teenage Love by Jack O. Stange
- Midwood 61180: Touching! Never Enough by Doris Holliday
- Midwood 61181: Sex A La Carte by Rose Darling
- Midwood 61182: Wet Lips by Jason Hytes
- Midwood 61183: Your Bed Or Mine by Jim Curry
- Midwood 61184: Ride Me by Guy Martin
- Midwood 61185:
- Midwood 61186: Mail Order Sex by Del Marks
- Midwood 61187: A Real Hot Number by Chris Simon
- Midwood 61188:
- Midwood 61189: Down On The Farm by Brian Clemens
- Midwood 61190: Dr. Feelgood by Chris Harrison
- Midwood 61191: Keyhole Kicks by Susan Ashley
- Midwood 61192: Honeymoon For Three by Seth Bates
- Midwood 61193: Hot Margarita by Michael Dorn
- Midwood 61194:
- Midwood 61195: Out Of Bounds by Robert Wahl
- Midwood 61196: Retail Romeo by Del Marks
- Midwood 61197: Confessions Of A Country School Teacher by Susan Eaton
- Midwood 61198: Susan's Big Bust by Michael Scott
- Midwood 61199: Weekend Swap by Todd Edmund
- Midwood 61200: Playmates by Chris Harrison
- Midwood 61201: Jet-Set Bisexuals by Jim Curry
- Midwood 61202: The Leather Game by Dora Carl
- Midwood 61203: A Degrading Affair by Bert Phelan
- Midwood 61204: The Hello Kiss by Mason Tibbs
- Midwood 61205: Betty's Gang Bang by Joseph Arrowsmith
- Midwood 61206: The Girls Of Summer by Arnold Evans
- Midwood 61207: Girl In Heat by George Devlin
- Midwood 61208: Farm Stud by Jackson March
- Midwood 61209: Jennifer Goes Wild by Lee Server
- Midwood 61210: Lusty Lady by Michael Doren
- Midwood 61211: Staying On Top by Robert Wahl
- Midwood 61212: Teacher Of Desire by Peter Caine
- Midwood 61213: Mountain Maid by Jack O. Stange
- Midwood 61214: Insatiable by George Devlin
- Midwood 61215: Summer Of Shame by Vincent Church
- Midwood 61216: Massage Sensation by Roy Tilman
- Midwood 61217: Odd Girl by Terry Fisher
- Midwood 61218:
- Midwood 61219: Everybody's Girl by Joseph Arrowsmith
- Midwood 61220: Sorority Sinners by Simeon Morris
- Midwood 61221: Reckless Flesh by Ben Doughty
- Midwood 61222: Kiss Of The Lash by Kirgy Fuentes
- Midwood 61223: Virgin Territory by Seymour Harris
- Midwood 61224: Fly Me, I'm Eve by Chris Harrison
- Midwood 61225: Red And Hot by Del Marks
- Midwood 61226: French Kiss by Joseph Arrowsmith
- Midwood 61227: Susie Turns On by Margot Peters
- Midwood 61228: No Price Too High by Doris Holliday
- Midwood 61229: Body Games by Michael Scott
- Midwood 61230: Deeper And Deeper by Roy Battle
- Midwood 61231: Stealing Daddy's Girl by Jack O. Stange
- Midwood 61232: Mind Over Mattress by Margot Peters
- Midwood 61233: Lady Jock by Jay Wood
- Midwood 61234: Teenage Bait by Jason Hyte
- Midwood 61235: Breakfast For Four by Chris Harrison
- Midwood 61236: Twisted Flesh by George Myers
- Midwood 61237:
- Midwood 61238: Shampoo Girl by Michael Jones
- Midwood 61239: Enraptured Lovers by March Hastings
- Midwood 61240: The Fetish Girls by Pat Aldrich
- Midwood 61241: Honeymoon Hotel by ?
- Midwood 61242: Peep Show by Del Marks
- Midwood 61243: Cruise Girl by Rose Darling
- Midwood 61244: Topless by Robert Wahl
- Midwood 61245: Val's Private Lessons by Lee Server
- Midwood 61246: Naked And Ready by T.S. Hanley
- Midwood 61247: Locker-Room Hussy by Joseph Arrowsmith
- Midwood 61248: CB Nymph by Jonathan Quist
- Midwood 61249: Pleasure Island by Don Starr
- Midwood 61250: Three Way Love by Bronc Calloway
- Midwood 61251: Handy Man by Stan Myers
- Midwood 61252: Hayloft Capers by Jack Fleischer
- Midwood 61253: Three For Pain by Jack O. Stange
- Midwood 61254: Lessons In Lust by Jay Wood
- Midwood 61255: Practice Dolls by ?
- Midwood 61256: Super-Stud by Geoffrey Reynolds
- Midwood 61257: Sex Teacher by Michael Scott
- Midwood 61258: Hot & Hotter by Michael Doren
- Midwood 61259: Available Susie by Roy Battle
- Midwood 61260: Sugar Baby by Joseph Arrowsmith
- Midwood 61261: Sex Spa by T. S. Hanley
- Midwood 61262: Thrust by Terry Fisher
- Midwood 61263: Girl Heat by Lee Server
- Midwood 61264: Five On A Honeymoon by ?
- Midwood 61265: Tarnished Angel by Don Starr
- Midwood 61266:
- Midwood 61267:
- Midwood 61268: Love Thy Brother by Ginger Craft
- Midwood 61269: Nymph by Gil Johns
- Midwood 61270: Bike Girl by Robert Moore
- Midwood 61271: Hot Trail by Bret Steele
- Midwood 61272: Summer Sex by Jay Wood
- Midwood 61273: Peeper by Jason Hyte
- Midwood 61274: Willing by Roy Battle
- Midwood 61275:
- Midwood 61276: Virgin by Robert Wahl
- Midwood 61277: Service by ?
- Midwood 61278: Swingers by Jack O. Stange
- Midwood 61279: Double Trouble by Stan Shafer
- Midwood 61280: Floating Orgy by Jay Wood
- Midwood 61281: Trailer Park Tramps by Pepper Starling
- Midwood 61282: Girl Cop by Kirby Fuentes
- Midwood 61283: Sex Before Six by Jason Hytes
- Midwood 61284: Hotel Lust by Lee Server
- Midwood 61285: Neighborhood Swap by Don Elcord
- Midwood 61286: Hungry Wives by Guy Sanders
- Midwood 61287: Honey Bear by Jack Adams
- Midwood 61288: Pleasure Quest by Don Starr
- Midwood 61289: Hot Playmates by ?
- Midwood 61290: Passion Arrangement by Michael Doren
- Midwood 61291: Nympho Nurse by Mel Johnson
- Midwood 61292: Miss Galaxy's Thrills by Roy Battle
- Midwood 61293: Housewives' Secrets by Doris Holliday
- Midwood 61294: Sinners Unlimited by Jonathan Swift
- Midwood 61295: Swinging Swappers by Margot Peters
- Midwood 61296: Wild For Thrills by ?
- Midwood 61297: Network Nymphs by L.L. Goode
- Midwood 61298: Voyeur's Delight by Alan Bell
- Midwood 61299: Centerfold Girl by Jim Curry
- Midwood 61300: Strange Sisters by Peter Stanley
- Midwood 61301: Ski-Lodge Weekend by Bob Schreiber
- Midwood 61302: Funland by Robert V. Woodward
- Midwood 61303: Doing It With Doc [aka 'Doing It With Doctor'] by Edwin Mozler
- Midwood 61304: Sleep-In Women by Kirby Fuentes
- Midwood 61305: Making Mary by Dora Carl + Lady Sings The Hots by Dorsey Lang
- Midwood 61306: Call Me Kitten by Cory Mallord + Fair Exchange by Leslie Roote
- Midwood 61307: Mountain Hussies by Michael Doren
- Midwood 61308: Lust Boat by Margot Peters
- Midwood 61309: Made For Sex by Don Starr
- Midwood 61310: Joint Action by Jay Wood
- Midwood 61311: Willing Thighs by Bill Harris
- Midwood 61312: Panty Thief by Will Rudd
- Midwood 61313: X-Rated Virgin by Stan Shafer
- Midwood 61314: Love Spurt by Linda DuBreuil
- Midwood 61315: Sex Tool by Chris Harrison
- Midwood 61316: Prisoner Of Pleasure by Brenda Piersall
- Midwood 61317: Paula's Passion by Ralph Burgess
- Midwood 61318: French Trip by Robert Wahl
- Midwood 61319: Lights Out by Lee Server
- Midwood 61320: Teach Me, Teacher by Jackie Dalton
- Midwood 61321: Wild Honey by Dora Carl + Nymph by Dorsey Lang
- Midwood 61322: Summer Of Sin by Don Starr + Campus Tramp by Lawrence Block
- Midwood 61323: I Want It All by Doris Holliday
- Midwood 61324: Hot Teacher by Roy Battle
- Midwood 61325: Ski-Lodge Lovers by Michael Scott
- Midwood 61326: Bluegrass Groupies by Jack O. Stange
- Midwood 61327: Bare It, Charity [aka 'Bare It'] by Peter Quinn
- Midwood 61328: Wild Cherry by John C. Douglas
- Midwood 61329: Torrid by Norton McVickers
- Midwood 61330: Pick-Up by Michael Adrian
- Midwood 61331: Contract For Lust by Michael Doren
- Midwood 61332: Swinging Cop by Bud Drake
- Midwood 61333: Lollipop Girl by Chris Harrison
- Midwood 61334: Secrets Of Olympic Village by Susan Ashley
- Midwood 61335: The Peepers by Dennis Roberts
- Midwood 61336: Silk Panties by George Simon
- Midwood 61337: Daytime Affairs by Michael Scott + Side Street Sex by Michael Scott
- Midwood 61338: Isle Of Love by Dora Carl + Happy Hips by Dorsey Lang
- Midwood 61339: X-Rated Wife by Michael Scott
- Midwood 61340: Sex Power by Jay Wood
- Midwood 61341: Twisted Love by Jackson Crain
- Midwood 61342: Making Cheerleader by Roy Battle
- Midwood 61343: Ripe by Nelson Bayne
- Midwood 61344: Hungry Wives by Guy Sanders
- Midwood 61345: Camera Cuties by Ephram Lord
- Midwood 61346: Games For Three by Jason Hytes
- Midwood 61347: Teach Me by Chris Harrison
- Midwood 61348: Once Upon A Bed by Stan Shafer
- Midwood 61349: Neighborhood Swap by Don Elcord
- Midwood 61350: The Outsiders by Robert Conrad
- Midwood 61351: Vice Is Nice by Rob O'Neal
- Midwood 61352: His Sister Taught Him by Robert McAfee
- Midwood 61353: Swinging Housewife by Jack Marsh + Reckless Redhead by Jack Marsh
- Midwood 61354: Strange Hungers by Don Starr + Any Man's Woman by Don Starr
- Midwood 61355: Wicked Bodies by Doris Holliday
- Midwood 61356: Sheila Makes Out by Rose Darling
- Midwood 61357: Jenny's Switch Game by Michael Doren
- Midwood 61358: Liz's Needs by Roy Battle
- Midwood 61359: Raunchy Rio by Jim Curry
- Midwood 61360: Heat by Stan Shafer
- Midwood 61361: Naked Caller by Randy Hale
- Midwood 61362: The Professor's Naughty Wife by Jason Hyte
- Midwood 61363: Sensuous Showgirl by Preston Harriman
- Midwood 61364:
- Midwood 61365: The Mattress Game by Paul London
- Midwood 61366:
- Midwood 61367: Photo Orgy by Jack Parker
- Midwood 61368: Sweet Cream by Dallas Mayo
- Midwood 61369: Prisoner Of Lust by Michael Scott + Sex Library by Michael Scott
- Midwood 61370: Wild Teens by Jack Marsh + Hot Hands by Jack Marsh
- Midwood 61371:
- Midwood 61372: Switching Party by Jay Wood
- Midwood 61373: On The Make by Doris Holliday
- Midwood 61374: Nude Beach by Michael Scott
- Midwood 61375: Soft And Warm by Terry Fisher
- Midwood 61376: Learning From Lovers by Max Nortic
- Midwood 61377: Silken Idol by Robert Moore
- Midwood 61378:
- Midwood 61379: Sweet Seduction by Bret Steele
- Midwood 61380: Virgin's Flight Plan by Del Marks
- Midwood 61381:
- Midwood 61382: Impatient Virgin by Andrew Laird
- Midwood 61383: High School Sinners by Geoffrey Ramdagger
- Midwood 61384: Wet Lips by Robert Evelyn
- Midwood 61385: Scandalous Teacher by Don Starr + Hot Pants Steno by Michael Jones
- Midwood 61386: Piece Meal by Dorsey Lang + Juicy Hotel by Dora Carl
- Midwood 61387: Do It! by Michael Doren
- Midwood 61388: One Hot Night by Lee Server
- Midwood 61389: Love Shop by Janis Pearl
- Midwood 61390: Office Sex Games by Dick Marx
- Midwood 61391: Hot Line by Terry Fisher
- Midwood 61392: Meet Marilyn by Thomas Cassidy
- Midwood 61393: Flaky by Kirby Fuentes
- Midwood 61394: Honky-Tonk Girl by J. Holbrook
- Midwood 61395: Hot Sister by Brian Denny
- Midwood 61396: Inside Eve by Todd Edmund
- Midwood 61397: Strong In The Saddle by Bret Steele
- Midwood 61398: Shame On Charlotte by Preston Harriman
- Midwood 61399: I Confess by Chris Harrison
- Midwood 61400: Country Hustler by Jim Curry
- Midwood 61401: Sister Nymphs by Dora Carl + Good-Bad Girl by Don Starr
- Midwood 61402: Office Playmates by Dorsey Lang + Hustler by Don Starr
- Midwood 61403: Taking A Chance On Lust by Charles E. Bates
- Midwood 61404: Naked Skater by Doris Holiday
- Midwood 61405: Possessed By Passion by Dick Marx
- Midwood 61406: Campus Heat by Margot Peters
- Midwood 61407: Caught In The Act by Jason Hytes
- Midwood 61408: Swinging Co-ed by Jack O. Stange
- Midwood 61409: Free Samples by Jack Walker
- Midwood 61410: Disco Lust by Bud Drake
- Midwood 61411: Groupies by Michael Scott
- Midwood 61412: Snow Bunny by Kirby Fuentes
- Midwood 61413: Blue Movie Girl by Jim Curry
- Midwood 61414: Plaything by Andrew Laird
- Midwood 61415: Wild by Vincent Church
- Midwood 61416: Love Means Never Saying No by Brian Hartley
- Midwood 61417: The Farmer's Daughter by Merry Woods + Young And Tempting by Don Starr
- Midwood 61418: Secrets by Dora Carl + Carol by Dorsey Lang
- Midwood 61419: Unashamed by Doris Holliday
- Midwood 61420: Games For Three by Micahel Doren
- Midwood 61421:
- Midwood 61422: Secretary's Tricks by Robert Wahl
- Midwood 61423: Woman Aflame by Dick Marx
- Midwood 61424: Four Of A Kind by Jason Hytes
- Midwood 61425: Gay Women by Maria Amore
- Midwood 61426: Peeping Tom by Jason Hytes
- Midwood 61427: No Stopping Nancy by Edwin Mozler
- Midwood 61428: Grabbing It by Del Marks
- Midwood 61429: Captive Katie by A. K. Devries
- Midwood 61430: Lost Innocence by Amanda King
- Midwood 61431: Party Doll by Stan Myers
- Midwood 61432: Lay-Away by George Myers
- Midwood 61433: Out For Thrills by Don Starr + Sin Seminar by Michael Jones
- Midwood 61434: Perfumed Trap by Don Starr + Hot Hostage by Dora Carl
- Midwood 61435: Manhunter by Michael Doren
- Midwood 61436:
- Midwood 61437: Special Services by Dick Marx
- Midwood 61438: Virgin No More by Jack O. Strange
- Midwood 61439: Passion Lovers by Chris Harriso
- Midwood 61440: Easy Entry by Joseph Arrowsmith
- Midwood 61441:
- Midwood 61442: Deep And Warm by Jacque Etienne
- Midwood 61443:
- Midwood 61444: Doctor Plays Dirty by Roy Battle
- Midwood 61445: Erica's Magic Touch by Jason Hytes
- Midwood 61446:
- Midwood 61447: Woman's Ecstasy by Dallas Mayo
- Midwood 61448: Degraded Teenager by Vincent Church
- Midwood 61449: The Harder She Tried by Don Starr + Wildcat by Dora Carl
- Midwood 61450:
- Midwood 61451: Sliding In by Jason Hyte
- Midwood 61452: Sex In The Afternoon by Jack O. Strange
- Midwood 61453: Your Bath Or Mine by Janis Pearl
- Midwood 61454:
- Midwood 61455: Anything For Thrills by Dick Marx
- Midwood 61456: Turned On Nympho by Joseph Arrowsmith
- Midwood 61457: Summer Camp by Dixie Laine
- Midwood 61458: Massage Girl by Jay Wood
- Midwood 61459:
- Midwood 61460:
- Midwood 61461: Sweet Betsy by Stan Shafer
- Midwood 61462:
- Midwood 61463: Stephanie's Awakening by Carlton Lake
- Midwood 61464: Flesh Ritual by Christopher Laine
- Midwood 61465: Society Tramp by Don Starr + The Casting Couch by Butch Temple
- Midwood 61466: Naked Spotlight by Don Starr + Singles Bar by Jim Curry
- Midwood 61467: Sheila's Heat by Michael Doren
- Midwood 61468: Up For Grabs by Doris Holliday
- Midwood 61469:
- Midwood 61470: School For Seduction by Robert Wahl
- Midwood 61471: Sex Games by Dick Marx
- Midwood 61472: Sticky Pants by Arnold Pennington
- Midwood 61473: Once In Love With Amy by Seth Bates
- Midwood 61474: Bedtime Babysitter by Odda deLazzo
- Midwood 61475: Housewife Hooker by Michael Scott
- Midwood 61476: Bonnie's Dilemma by Don Elcord
- Midwood 61477: Luscious by Paul Grant
- Midwood 61478: Two-Way Stretch by Claudia Cole
- Midwood 61479: Private Sessions by March Hastings
- Midwood 61480: Willing Housewives by Del Marks
- Midwood 61481: On The Make by Don Starr + The Ultimate Sin by Walter Leveraux
- Midwood 61482:
- Midwood 61483: Love Feast by Michael Doren
- Midwood 61484: Strangers In Bed by Dick Marx
- Midwood 61485: Crazy For Love by Dirk Malloy
- Midwood 61486: Doll Baby by James Leo
- Midwood 61487: The Rancher's Daughter by Jason Hyte
- Midwood 61488: Bush Country by Robert McAfee
- Midwood 61489: Love Doctor by Ralph Blasi
- Midwood 61490: Hot Wife by Roy Battle
- Midwood 61491: Sinful Sisters by ?
- Midwood 61492: A Beautiful Piece by James Miller
- Midwood 61493: Stroking by Lee Server
- Midwood 61494: Mother Trucker by Del Marks
- Midwood 61495: Fly Girls by Margot Peters
- Midwood 61496: Born Different by Terry Fisher
- Midwood 61497: Coed by June Curtiss + Jocko's Kicks by Seth Bates
- Midwood 61498: Trapped by Roy L. Couch + Gina Gives In by Todd Edmund
- Midwood 61499: Rich Bitch by Michael Doren
- Midwood 61500: Pleasure Takers by Doris Holliday
- Midwood 61501: Campus Tramp by Robert Wahl
- Midwood 61502: All Her Lovers by Dick Marx
- Midwood 61503: Swappers Unlimited by George Devlin
- Midwood 61504: Bad Girl In Town by George Devlin
- Midwood 61505: Love-In by Michael Scott
- Midwood 61506: Bike Girl by Robert Moore
- Midwood 61507: Hot Twins by Max Richards
- Midwood 61508: Family Bride by Stan Shafer
- Midwood 61509: Massage Parlor by Del Marks
- Midwood 61510: Lesbian Dollhouse by Dallas Mayo
- Midwood 61511: Over-Developed by Jason Hytes
- Midwood 61512: Route 69 by Chris Harrison
- Midwood 61513: Eager To Learn by ? + Begging To Love by A. K. DeVries
- Midwood 61514: Cherry Pink by Brian Summers + Reckless Flesh by John Deli
- Midwood 61515: No Scruples by Doris Holliday
- Midwood 61516: One More Time by Robert Wahl
- Midwood 61517: Split-Level Swap by Dick Marx
- Midwood 61518: Hot Secretary by Earl Arno
- Midwood 61519: Festival Of Sex by Jason Hytes
- Midwood 61520: Girl In The Red Bikini [aka 'Bikini Girl'] by George Devlin
- Midwood 61521: Small Town Secrets by Del Marks
- Midwood 61522: Night Rider by Jim Curry
- Midwood 61523: Summer Sex by Jack O. Stange
- Midwood 61524: Out Of Control by Jay Wood
- Midwood 61525: We Two by Dallas Mayo
- Midwood 61526: The Private Life Of A Beauty Queen by Lee Server
- Midwood 61527: Joy Ride by Lee Blase
- Midwood 61528: Heat Of Passion by Scott Morris
- Midwood 61529: Lusty Nashville by Michael Doren
- Midwood 61530: Runaway Tramps by Don Starr
- Midwood 61531: Sinful Wives by Doris Holliday
- Midwood 61532: Stay Until Morning by Cynthia Sydney
- Midwood 61533: Night School Hussy by Dixie Laine
- Midwood 61534: Sex Ship by Jack O. Strange
- Midwood 61535: Wild Nymphos by Dick Marx
- Midwood 61536: Good Time Girl by Earl Arno
- Midwood 61537: French Love by ?
- Midwood 61538: That Wonderful Need [aka 'Seductive Reasoning'] by Geoffrey Ramdagger
- Midwood 61539: The Way We Are by Jason Hytes
- Midwood 61540: Silk Stockings by Carlton Lake
- Midwood 61541: Snap Me, I'm Yours by Rose Darling
- Midwood 61542: Sex - Southern Style by Roy Battle
- Midwood 61543: Pool Of Loneliness by Dallas Mayo
- Midwood 61544: Golden Mermaid by Guy Martin
- Midwood 61545:
- Midwood 61546: Blonde Fever by Don Starr
- Midwood 61547: Dude Ranch Bitch by Jay Wood
- Midwood 61548: Teen Model by Robert Wahl
- Midwood 61549: Sin School by Dick Marx
- Midwood 61550: Too Hot To Handle by Jamie Edwards
- Midwood 61551: Suburbia's Swap Set by Earl Arno
- Midwood 61552: Impatient Age by Jock O. Stange
- Midwood 61553:
- Midwood 61554:
- Midwood 61555: Wife Swapping Arrangement by Robert Conrad
- Midwood 61556: Wife Next Door by George Devlin
- Midwood 61557: Suzy's Secrets by Kirby Fuentes
- Midwood 61558:
- Midwood 61559: Silky by Joseph Arrowsmith
- Midwood 61560: Sticky Fingers by Ricardo Santagata
- Midwood 61561: The Hard Way by Michael Doren
- Midwood 61562: Julia's One Night Stands by Anthony Dunne
- Midwood 61562: Pleasure Addict by Jack O'Strange
- Midwood 61563: Miss Stuck-Up by Rob O'Neal
- Midwood 61564: Wild Waitress by Jamie Edwards
- Midwood 61565: Girl Next Door by Earl Arno
- Midwood 61566: Sex Ranch by Dick Marx
- Midwood 61567: Games Women Play by Robert Wahl
- Midwood 61568: Play For Keeps by Jay Wood
- Midwood 61569: Deep Thrust by Del Marks
- Midwood 61570: Campus Love-In by Margot Peters
- Midwood 61571: Begging For Love by A. K. Devries
- Midwood 61572: File Under 'Passion' by Michael Doren
- Midwood 61573: The Fluffy Girl by Dallas Mayo
- Midwood 61574: Office Playmates by Dorsey Lang
- Midwood 61575: Pale Throat by Carlton Lake
- Midwood 61576: On The Road by Joseph Arrowsmith
- Midwood 61577: Swapping Pool by Leo Grant
- Midwood 61578: Daddy's Girl by Don Starr
- Midwood 61579: Erotic Festival by Robert Wahl
- Midwood 61580:
- Midwood 61581: No Sense Of Shame by Earl Arno
- Midwood 61582: Nympho Nurse by Jamie Edwards
- Midwood 61583: Wild Fling by Jason Hytes
- Midwood 61584: The Mistress by Lee Server
- Midwood 61585: Flying by Jim Curry
- Midwood 61586: Hot Co-Ed by Roy Battle
- Midwood 61587: Never Say No by Jay Wood
- Midwood 61588:
- Midwood 61589: The Love Seekers by Gerald Kramer
- Midwood 61590: Kitten by Robert Moore
- Midwood 61591: Rosa's Way by Joseph Arrowsmith
- Midwood 61592: Turning On by Ray L. Couch
- Midwood 61593:
- Midwood 61594: Hot Honey by Anthony Dunne
- Midwood 61595: Wanton Wife by Don Starr
- Midwood 61596: Free And Easy by Robert Wahl
- Midwood 61597:
- Midwood 61598:
- Midwood 61599:
- Midwood 61600: Sleeping Around by Marshall Jacks
- Midwood 61601: Family Affair by Margot Peters
- Midwood 61602: Patty's One Pleasure by Erik Hampden
- Midwood 61603: Hot Shampoo by Joseph Arrowsmith
- Midwood 61604:
- Midwood 61605: Mate Sharing by Jay Wood
- Midwood 61606: Campus Lust by Tony McBride
- Midwood 61607: Schoolmates by ?
- Midwood 61608:
- Midwood 61609: Vixen by Antony Dunn
- Midwood 61610:
- Midwood 61611: Hot Repair Girl by Dick Marx
- Midwood 61612: Overheated by Earl Arno
- Midwood 61613:
- Midwood 61614:
- Midwood 61615: Games Wives Play by Don Starr
- Midwood 61616: Three In A Bed by Jack O. Strange
- Midwood 61617: Nympho On The Run by Brenda Curtis
- Midwood 61618: The Sex Spa by Del Marks
- Midwood 61619:
- Midwood 61620: Bad Sister by Roy Battle
- Midwood 61621:
- Midwood 61622: Naked Ecstasy by Erica Black
- Midwood 61623:
- Midwood 61624: Girlstown by Dallas Mayo
- Midwood 61625:
- Midwood 61626: Five O'Clock Kicks by Roger Biggers
- Midwood 61627: Sex School by Don Starr
- Midwood 61628: Neighborhood Playmates by Roy Battle
- Midwood 61629: Double Pleasure by Robert Wahl
- Midwood 61630: Sign Here For Sin by Jamie Edwards
- Midwood 61631:
- Midwood 61632: Never Too Hot by Leo Grant
- Midwood 61633: 3 Ways To Love by Guy Martin
- Midwood 61634: Body Heat by Gerald Kramer
- Midwood 61635: Special Tastes by Jim Curry
- Midwood 61636: Senor Rogue: A Latin Lover's Adventures by Ramon
- Midwood 61637: Carol by Dorsey Lang
- Midwood 61638: Pleasure's Their Business by March Hastings
- Midwood 61639:
- Midwood 61640: Mommy's Sick Friends by B. Redding
- Midwood 61641: The Body Shop by J.J. Madison
- Midwood 61642: Teasin' Redhead by Don Starr
- Midwood 61643: One Hot Weekend by J.C. Comstock
- Midwood 61644: Cool Lips - Hot Hips by ?
- Midwood 61645: Too Many Men by Jason Hytes
- Midwood 61646: Teen Swinger by Terry Cash
- Midwood 61647: Always Available by Jim Conroy
- Midwood 61648: Laid Back Lady by Robert Wahl
- Midwood 61649: Point Red by Veronica
- Midwood 61650: Shared Beds by Marc Antoine
- Midwood 61651: Just Whistle by Joseph Arrowsmith
- Midwood 61652: The Devil Made Me Do It by Guy Martin
- Midwood 61653: Superstar Sex by Don Starr
- Midwood 61654: Possession by Frederick Bailey
- Midwood 61655: Open Kiss by Ivan Zummo
- Midwood 61656: Lovely Rogue by Thomas Morley
- Midwood 61657: Daddy's Darling by Don Starr
- Midwood 61658: Magda's Lust by Dixie Laine
- Midwood 61659: She Wanted Everything by Dick Marx
- Midwood 61660: Wide Open by Roger Biggers
- Midwood 61661: Family Affair by Margo Peters
- Midwood 61662: Pleasure Addict by Jack O. Strange
- Midwood 61663: Fetish Paradise by Lee Server
- Midwood 61664: Topless Virgin by Michael Doren
- Midwood 61665: Indoor Sports by Jack Walker
- Midwood 61666: Bed Fun - Country Style by Dora Carl
- Midwood 61667: Laundromat Jezebels by ?
- Midwood 61668: Touching by Robert Conrad
- Midwood 61669: Nude Beauty by Merry Wood
- Midwood 61670: Getting Gloria by Gus Stevens
- Midwood 61671: Cloud Nine by Roy L. Couch
- Midwood 61672: Teach Me by Chris Harrison
- Midwood 61673: Swap Party by Don Starr
- Midwood 61674: Rough Sex by Lee Server
- Midwood 61675: Nympho On The Run by Brenda Curtis
- Midwood 61676: Campus Virgin by Jason Hytes
- Midwood 61677: One Night Stand [aka 'Scandal'] by Dallas Mayo
- Midwood 61678: Sin Time by Terry Shaffer
- Midwood 61679: Make Me! by Robert Wahl
- Midwood 61680: Teenage Tease by Pepper Starling
- Midwood 61681: Try Me by Dorsey Lang
- Midwood 61682: Country Club Capers by Jim Curry
- Midwood 61683: Dial Me For Love by Bud Drake
- Midwood 61684: Pink Lips by Robert Conrad
- Midwood 61685: Teenage Beach Bunny by Del Marks
- Midwood 61686: The Secret by Dallas Mayo
- Midwood 61687: Coming Loose by Gerald Kramer
- Midwood 61688: Quartette by Jonathon Quist
- Midwood 61689: Roll Over Easy by Don Starr
- Midwood 61690: Lisa's Hot Summer by Michael Doren
- Midwood 61691: Night Action by Dick Marx
- Midwood 61692: Loving It Hard by Roger Biggers
- Midwood 61693: Hot Trail by Bret Steele
- Midwood 61694: Teasin' Bitch by Martin Peters
- Midwood 61695: Over-Exposed by Jason Hytes
- Midwood 61696: Delicious Nightmare by Dallas Mayo
- Midwood 61697: Vibrations by Michael Doren
- Midwood 61698: Sables And Trash by Kirby Fuentes
- Midwood 61699: Teacher's Pet by Edward McCallin
- Midwood 61700: She Loves It In The Country by Dorsey Lang
- Midwood 61701: Pillow Talk by Sloan Britain
- Midwood 61702: Slow Burn by Marcus Pendanter
- Midwood 61703: Shame by Guy Martin
- Midwood 61704: Call Girls' Doctor by Erik Hampden
- Midwood 61705: Ripe And Ready by Don Starr
- Midwood 61706: Strange Triangle by Chris Harrison
- Midwood 61707: Orgy Club by ?
- Midwood 61708: Wild Honey by Dora Carl
- Midwood 61709: Hotel Hostess by Dick Marx
- Midwood 61710: Wives On The Loose by ?
- Midwood 61711: Vixens by Jason Hytes
- Midwood 61712: Sexy Kitten by Jack O' Strange
- Midwood 61713: Christine's Savage Passions by ?
- Midwood 61714: Pleasure Thrust by Bart Roscoe
- Midwood 61715: Joanie by Michael Doren
- Midwood 61716: Carol's Sex Fever by Jay Wood
- Midwood 61717: Darling Daughter by Joseph Arrowsmith
- Midwood 61718: Family Secrets by Chris Harrison
- Midwood 61719: One Girl's Lust by Michael Doren
- Midwood 61720: Tiger Girl by Guy Martin
- Midwood 61721: Bad Sister by Roy Battle + Shared Beds by Marc Antoine
- Midwood 61722: Go Down, Angel [aka 'Trapped Into Passion' or 'Submitting to Passion' or 'Sex For Everyone'] by Jim Curry + The Husband Taster by Don Elcord
- Midwood 61723:
- Midwood 61724: Girl-Crazy Girl by Dallas Mayo + For Women Only by Dallas Mayo
- Midwood 61725: Flesh Session by Robin Townsend + Joy Journey by William Branch
- Midwood 61726: High School Sinners by Geoffrey Ramdagger + The Mating Game by Tim Lang
- Midwood 61727: Stroke Me Different by Roger Biggers
- Midwood 61728: Overripe by Ginger Craft
- Midwood 61729: Beach Party by Joseph Arrowsmith
- Midwood 61730:
- Midwood 61731: Route 69 by Harry Logan
- Midwood 61732: Bedroom Business by Reg Bryant
- Midwood 61733:
- Midwood 61734: Her Private Boy [aka 'Nothing To It'] by Raphael Blasi
- Midwood 61735: Cathy's Passion by Robert Wahl
- Midwood 61736:
- Midwood 61737: Voyeur's Delight by Alan Bell + Carnal Cousins by Jack Vaste
- Midwood 61738: Play By Play by Collis Barker + Sheila's Sins by Gail Johns
- Midwood 61739: Flesh And Leather by Simeon Morris + The Boss' Wife by Ben Doughty
- Midwood 61740: Wild Cherry by John C. Douglas + Brenda's Last Fling by Veronica King
- Midwood 61741: Doing Daddy by Samuel Sutton + Trapped by Roy L. Couch
- Midwood 61742: Strange Sisters by Peter Stanley + Soft Shoulders by John Denis
- Midwood 61743: Housewife Call Girl by Jack O. Stange
- Midwood 61744: Lessons In Lesbian Love by Dallas Mayo
- Midwood 61745: Velvet Thighs by Stan Shafer
- Midwood 61746: Teach Me by Chris Harrison
- Midwood 61747:
- Midwood 61748: High Fliers by Jay Wood
- Midwood 61749: Pleasure Street by Joseph Arrowsmith
- Midwood 61750: Mouth To Mouth by Jason Hyte
- Midwood 61751:
- Midwood 61752: The Real Thing by James Charles
- Midwood 61753:
- Midwood 61754: Young & Hot by Ginger Craft + Rock-A-Bye Baby by George Shaw
- Midwood 61755: Pretty Baby by Sloan Brittain + Hanging Loose by Sloan Brittain
- Midwood 61756: Strange Trio by Michael Doren + Summer Heat by Chris Harrison
- Midwood 61757: Sex Circus Sisters by Jack Vaste + Call It Sin by Austin Barr
- Midwood 61758: Kinky Tramp by Chris Harrison + Give It To Me by Del Marks
- Midwood 61759:
- Midwood 61760: Free Samples by Jack Walker
- Midwood 61761: Teen Tramp by Ricardo Santagata
- Midwood 61762:
- Midwood 61763: Young Stuff by Gene Evans
- Midwood 61764: Girl Heat by Girl Heat
- Midwood 61765: Blonde Vixen by George Devlin
- Midwood 61766: Hot Sister by Brian Denny
- Midwood 61767: Your Bed Or Mine by Jim Curry
- Midwood 61768: Love Thy Brother by Ginger Craft
- Midwood 61769: Tempting Daddy by I. Smithson + Society Tramp by Collis Barker
- Midwood 61770: So Soft by Ed Shaughnessy + Girls School by Chris Harrison
- Midwood 61771: Down On The Farm by Brian Clemens + Keyhole Kicks by Susan Ashley
- Midwood 61772:
- Midwood 61773: Teenage Love by Jack O. Stange + Dr. Feelgood by Chris Harrison
- Midwood 61774: Flesh Trade by Ricardo Santagata + Touching - Never Enough by Doris Holliday
- Midwood 61775:
- Midwood 61776: Sex Unlimited by Dick Marx
- Midwood 61777: Brutal Lovers by Jason Hytes
- Midwood 61778: Red-Hot Redhead by Robert Wahl
- Midwood 61779: Hot Summer by Annette Devlin
- Midwood 61780:
- Midwood 61781: Sorority Sinners by Simeon Morris
- Midwood 61782:
- Midwood 61783: A Real Hot Number by Chris Simon
- Midwood 61784: French Job by Florence King
- Midwood 61785: Farm Stud by Jackson Marsh + After School Swingers by Wesley Locke
- Midwood 61786: Turning On by Ray Couch + Lip Service by Roy Battle
- Midwood 61787: Breakfast For Four by ? The Action Girls by ?
- Midwood 61788: The Incest Game by Ted Kittering + Donna's Delight by Randy Hale
- Midwood 61789: Weekend Swap by Todd Edmund + The Hello Kiss by Mason Tibbs
- Midwood 61790: Lust by Michael Doren + The Wild Countess by Harry Logan
- Midwood 61791:
- Midwood 61792: Teenage Bride by Earl Arno
- Midwood 61793: Obsessed by Robert Wahl
- Midwood 61794: Restless Virgin by Jason Hyte
- Midwood 61795: Betty's Gang Bang by Joseph Arrowsmith
- Midwood 61796:
- Midwood 61797: A Degrading Affair by Bert Phelan
- Midwood 61798: Meet Marilyn by Thomas Cassidy
- Midwood 61799: No Price Too High by Doris Holliday
- Midwood 61800: Massage Sensation by Roy Tilman
- Midwood 61801:
- Midwood 61802: Confessions Of A County School Teacher by ? + Retail Romeo by ?
- Midwood 61803:
- Midwood 61804: Pussy's Brother by Erik Hampton + Insatiable by George Devlin
- Midwood 61805: Mail Order Sex by Dek Marks + Wet Lips by Robert Evelyn
- Midwood 61806: Finger Man by Raphael De Santiago + Honeymoon For Three by Seth Bates
- Midwood 61807: Teenage Nympho by Jason Hyte
- Midwood 61808: Sex Club by Dick Marx
- Midwood 61809: Family Fun [aka 'Sins Of Our Father'] by Margot Peters
- Midwood 61810: Whatever She Wanted by Earl Arno
- Midwood 61811:
- Midwood 61812: Kathy's Fling by Sherry Berger
- Midwood 61813: Body Games by Michael Scott
- Midwood 61814: Three For Pain by Jack O. Stange
- Midwood 61815: Mind Over Mattress by Margot Peters
- Midwood 61816: Teach Me Teacher by Jackie Dalton
- Midwood 61817: Carnival Of Lust by Marlin Cruse
- Midwood 61818:
- Midwood 61819: Twisted Flesh by George Myers + Kiss Of The Lash by Kirgy Fuentes
- Midwood 61820: The Willing Captive by Antony Dunne

== See also ==
- Pulp magazine
- Lesbian pulp fiction
