= Battling Billson =

Battling Billson is a 1923 short stories character by P. G. Wodehouse. He is featured in the following short stories:

- The Debut of Battling Billson
- The Return of Battling Billson
- The Exit of Battling Billson
- The Come-back of Battling Billson

Billson is a semi-professional pugilist. He is very large, very strong, usually friendly and obliging, and very stupid. He is devoted to his fiancée Flossie. He has flaming red hair.

All four stories feature Stanley Featherstonehaugh Ukridge, the charismatic but unlucky man-about-town who always has a get-rich-quick scheme. In these stories, the schemes involve betting on, or rigging, Battling Billson's fights.

Billson is mentioned in Wodehouse's 1957 novel Something Fishy. He is now married to Flossie, whose brother Augustus Keggs is one of the main characters in the novel.

== See also ==
- Battling (disambiguation)
- Billson (disambiguation)
