= Ukridge Rounds a Nasty Corner =

1924 short story by P. G. Wodehouse

- Short story by P. G. Wodehouse
- Language: English
- Genre: Comedy

Publication
- Publisher: Cosmopolitan (US); Strand (UK)
- Media type: Print (Magazine)
- Publication date: January 1924 (US); February 1924 (UK)

"Ukridge Rounds a Nasty Corner" is a short story by British author P. G. Wodehouse, which first appeared in the United States in the January 1924 issue of Cosmopolitan, and in the United Kingdom in the February 1924 Strand. It features the irrepressible Stanley Featherstonehaugh Ukridge, and was included in the collection Ukridge, published in 1924.

== Plot ==
When James Corcoran is hired to help prepare the memoirs of a deceased colonial, he is amazed to see his friend Ukridge visiting the house, pretending not to know him. He had, earlier that day, received a bottle of patent medicine and a parrot, delivered by Ukridge, so he is even more amazed when Ukridge brings up parrots to his employer, Lady Elizabeth Lakenheath.

Ukridge later reveals that he has fallen in love with and wooed Millie, Lady Elizabeth's niece and ward, and together they have kidnapped the parrot in order to help obtain the aunt's consent to their marriage. Ukridge is also involved in the sale of "Peppo", the patent medicine.

The parrot scheme is successful, but Millie's aunt wishes to meet Ukridge's Aunt Julia. Knowing that any such meeting will result in the revealing of Ukridge's past, they must stop the two from coming into contact until Aunt Julia, currently working in rural seclusion, leaves for a tour of America.

When Lady Elizabeth is invited to a meeting of the Pen and Ink Club, Corky goes to Aunt Julia's house to intercept a speech she is due to make at the meeting, hoping that the lack of a speech will prevent her from attending. Julia has returned early, however, and is highly suspicious of Corky's presence. Next day at the Lakenheath's he expects to find Ukridge's name turned to mud, but all is well; Lady Elizabeth was unable to attend the meeting, as her precious parrot was sick.

Ukridge reveals that the plucky Millie had plied the parrot with Peppo, rendering it dangerously inebriated.

Millie and Ukridge would later marry, and on occasion rely on Lady Elizabeth to pull them out of hot water, as in Love Among the Chickens (1906).

== Main characters ==
- Stanley Featherstonehaugh Ukridge, the irrepressible entrepreneur
  - Julia Ukridge, his haughty writer aunt
- Millie, a girl Ukridge falls for
  - Lady Elizabeth Lakenheath, Millie's parrot-loving aunt
- James Corcoran, Ukridge's writer friend
- George Tupper, an old schoolfriend of Ukridge and Corcoran

== Publication history ==
The story was illustrated by T. D. Skidmore in Cosmopolitan, and by Reginald Cleaver in The Strand Magazine.

It was included in Nothing But Wodehouse, a Wodehouse short story collection edited by Ogden Nash and published by Doubleday, Doran & Company in July 1932. It was also collected in The World of Ukridge, published in October 1975 by Barrie & Jenkins.

== Adaptations ==
The story was adapted by Helmar Fernback for radio in 1956, with Michael Shepley as Ukridge, Hubert Gregg as Corcoran, Margot Lister as Aunt Julia, Martin Lewis as Bowles, Bryan Powley as Leonard the parrot, and Belle Chrystall as Millie.

It was adapted as an episode in the television series The World of Wodehouse. The episode, titled "The Nasty Corner", aired in 1968.

The sixth episode of the 1992–1993 Ukridge radio series was adapted from the story. The episode, "Ukridge Rounds a Nasty Corner", first aired on 25 January 1993, with Griff Rhys Jones as Ukridge, Robert Bathurst as Corky, Adam Godley as Tupper, Simon Godley as Beamish, Rebecca Front as Millie and Mabel, Dougal Lee as Mr Price, and Julian Dutton as Hank Philbrick (from "Ukridge Sees Her Through"). The story was adapted by Julian Dutton.

== See also ==
- List of Wodehouse's Ukridge stories
