= Young Men in Spats =

1936 short story collection by P. G. Wodehouse

First UK edition

Young Men in Spats is a collection of short stories by P. G. Wodehouse, first published in the United Kingdom on 3 April 1936 by Herbert Jenkins, London, then in the United States with a slightly different selection of stories on 24 July 1936 by Doubleday, Doran, New York.

The collection, recounting the adventures of various members of the Drones Club (except for the last one), features many familiar characters from Wodehouse's other writings, including Freddie Widgeon and the irrepressible Mr Mulliner. One story, "Uncle Fred Flits By", features the first appearance of Pongo Twistleton and his Uncle Fred, who featured in four novels, including two appearances at Blandings Castle.

The US edition contains a slightly different selection of stories from the UK version. "Tried in the Furnace" and "Trouble Down At Tudsleigh" had not previously appeared in the US, and were held back so they could garner greater income from magazine sales. (Both stories eventually appeared in Cosmopolitan.) These two stories were accordingly replaced by three Oldest Member golf stories, "There's Always Golf", "The Letter of the Law", and "Farewell to Legs". These three Oldest Member stories had all appeared in US magazines in 1935 and early 1936; they all later appeared in the UK in Lord Emsworth and Others (1937). After their Cosmopolitan appearances, "Tried in the Furnace" was included in the US-only collection The Crime Wave at Blandings (1937), and "Trouble Down at Tudsleigh" was included in the US edition of Eggs, Beans and Crumpets (1940).

== Contents ==
=== "Fate" ===
- United Kingdom: Strand, May 1931
- United States: Cosmopolitan, May 1931 (as "Compromised!")

The story is the first in the main Drones Club canon, and stars Freddie Widgeon, who would become one of the two most prominent characters in the Drones Club series, the other being Bingo Little.

The story takes place in New York, and was written and published while Prohibition was in effect in the United States. While it is not directly referenced in the story, it is hinted at when Freddie Widgeon drinks from a flask hidden in his hip pocket, and when Mrs. Silvers drinks liquor that her husband made in a still.

Freddie Widgeon tries to woo Mavis Peasemarch again in the 1939 short story "Bramley Is So Bracing".

Plot

At the Drones Club, a Crumpet (a nondescript club member) says that Freddie Widgeon has returned from New York, where he lost the girl he loved. Freddie told the Crumpet that everything happened because of Fate, so there is no reason to worry about it. The Crumpet tells a Bean the following story about what happened.

In New York, Freddie is happily engaged to Mavis Peasemarch, an upstanding church-going girl and daughter of Lord Bodsham. One day, Freddie reads (and believes) scandal stories in a tabloid, and later sees a plain-looking girl struggling with a heavy suitcase. Freddie offers to help, and they go to her flat. Fatigued after carrying the suitcase, Freddie rests on a chair and talks to the girl, who is named Myra Jennings. Suddenly, the door bursts open, and three men enter. They remark that their case is open and shut now that they have discovered Mrs. Silvers with a man, and Freddie infers that they are private detectives. When Myra points out they are in the wrong flat, the detectives pay for the door and leave.

Freddie tells Mavis and her father what happened, and they become suspicious about Freddie seeing another girl. To clear himself of suspicion, Freddie plans to show Mavis that the girl he helped is plain-looking. He goes to Myra Jennings's flat, but she is out. Myra's neighbour, a beautiful woman wearing a negligee, complains that her room is too hot and persuades Freddie to help her open her window, which is stuck. Mrs. Silvers, as she turns out to be, tells Freddie how she is unhappy with her jealous husband. Freddie holds her hand sympathetically. At that moment, the door flies open, and the detectives appear again.

The detectives think Freddie is romantically involved with Mrs. Silvers, and say that Mrs. Silvers should be ashamed. Freddie, offended that they are aspersing a woman's name, injudiciously hits the head detective. He ends up in a prison cell. In the morning, he pays the court fifty dollars, and discovers the scandal of his being discovered with Mrs. Silvers in a newspaper. Deciding he could not convince Mavis or her father of the truth, he returns to England. As his boat docks at Southampton, he sees a very pretty girl drop her vanity bag. He ignores this, having given up on helping damsels in distress.

=== "Tried in the Furnace" ===
- UK: Strand, September 1935
- US: Cosmopolitan, March 1937

The story introduces the recurring character Barmy Fotheringay-Phipps and features Pongo Twistleton. The character Angelica Briscoe would later appear in the Jeeves novel Aunts Aren't Gentlemen (1974).

The titular phrase "tried in the furnace" means being purified or improved by an ordeal. With comedic exaggeration, the title refers to Barmy and Pongo emerging as purer and better after undergoing a difficult experience.

Plot

After the annual smoking-concert at the Drones Club, the members praise the knockabout cross-talk act (a comedic slapstick double act) performed by Cyril "Barmy" Fotheringay-Phipps and Reginald "Pongo" Twistleton-Twistleton. A Crumpet remarks that Barmy and Pongo underwent an ordeal that nearly ended their friendship. The Crumpet, having heard about what happened from Barmy, narrates the following story.

Barmy and Pongo go to the seaside resort Bridmouth-on-Sea to practice their cross-talk act. They see Angelica Briscoe, daughter of the Rev. P. P. Briscoe. She lives in Maiden Eggesford, a nearby town. Both young men become smitten with her. Pongo tells Barmy that he is going to London for a day or two, and Barmy tells him not to hurry, planning to take the opportunity to go see Angelica. The next day, Saturday, Barmy books a room in a pub in Maiden Eggesford, and finds Pongo there. Pongo had lied and also wants to see Angelica. Barmy meets a man a few years older than him called Mr. Briscoe and concludes he is Angelica's brother. Mr. Briscoe introduces Barmy to Angelica, and Barmy agrees to help her run the annual village School Treat on Monday. Pongo learns about this and resents Barmy for coming between him and the girl he loves.

Sympathetic to Pongo, Barmy sends a note to Angelica saying Pongo will go in his stead. Pongo is surprised and grateful. However, Angelica asks Barmy to instead accompany the village mothers on their annual outing. Barmy thinks this is proof that she loves him. On Monday, Barmy joins the sixteen mature women in a bus. He is overwhelmed when the women let loose, singing ribald songs and throwing tomatoes at passers-by. They stir up trouble at an amusement park, and Barmy later has to row their sailing boat.

After a long day, Barmy returns to the pub. Pongo blames him for sending him to the School Treat, where he was smeared with chocolate and whacked with newspapers by children. They argue, until the barmaid tells them Angelica Briscoe is already engaged to Mr. Briscoe, who is actually her second cousin. Mr. Briscoe had kept this secret because he wanted to get someone else to chaperone the school fair. Barmy and Pongo decide that a girl who would inflict school fairs or troublemaking mothers on someone is not worth bothering about anyway. They clasp hands, their friendship restored.

=== "Trouble Down at Tudsleigh" ===
- UK: Strand, May 1935
- US: Cosmopolitan, May 1939

Wodehouse's earlier story The Girl on the Boat (1922) features a character named Sam Marlowe who studies Tennyson's works to impress a girl. Wodehouse reused this plot point in "Trouble Down at Tudsleigh", in which Freddie Widgeon reads Tennyson's works to impress April.

Plot

At the Drones Club, a Crumpet tries to sell a book of Alfred, Lord Tennyson's poems, but nobody is interested. The book belongs to Freddie Widgeon, whom the Crumpet is trying to sell the book for. The other Drones are shocked that Freddie would buy such a book. Saying that Freddie bought it to impress a girl, the Crumpet narrates the following story.

Freddie goes to a town called Tudsleigh in Worcestershire to fish. He falls in love with April Carroway, the daughter of a family friend residing at Tudsleigh Court. April reads a book titled Collected Works of Alfred, Lord Tennyson to her kid sister Prudence. Freddie acquires a copy. He meets Captain Bradbury, an intimidating man of the British Indian Army and a jealous rival for April's love. Freddie reads Tennyson's "Lady of Shalott", and impresses April by discussing the poet with her. She agrees to go rowing and then picnic with him. Bradbury threatens Freddie, but Freddie is undeterred.

Waiting in the boat the next day, Freddie sees Prudence, who tells him that April cannot come. April wants Freddie to take Prudence instead, and April will try to come later. Freddie and Prudence set off. Prudence feels that Tennyson's heroines are soppy, but Freddie disagrees and says she would do well to behave like any one of them. After lunch, Prudence mentions that she was expelled from school for playing William Tell and trying to shoot an apple off the head of a pig, and she had also set her dormitory on fire playing Florence Nightingale ("The Lady with the Lamp"). Freddie takes a nap, then finds Prudence gone. He thinks he sees her in the river so he swims in, but it is only her frock.

Looking for dry clothes, Freddie enters a nearby unoccupied house. He is changing when he sees Bradbury, clearly the owner of the house, coming to the front door. Alarmed, Freddie bolts the door shut. Bradbury glares at him through the window and goes around the house. Freddie exits through the front door, and realizes he has no trousers on. Driving off in Bradbury's car, Freddie covers his lap with a rug. He sees April Carroway, who found Prudence. Prudence stays in a bush since she lost some of her clothes in the river. Following Freddie's advice, she had tried to imitate Lady Godiva (as described in Tennyson's poem "Godiva"). April tells Freddie to let Prudence use the rug. Freddie remorsefully must refuse, and he drives off. To hide from Bradbury, he is now growing a beard. A letter from April has proven that the book of Tennyson's works is no longer of any use to him.

=== "The Amazing Hat Mystery" ===
- US: Cosmopolitan, August 1933
- UK: Strand, June 1934

Along with the other Drones Club story "Uncle Fred Flits By", this story was based on ideas given to Wodehouse by his friend Bill Townend.

Unlike most of the protagonists of Wodehouse's Drones Club short stories, neither Percy Wimbolt nor Nelson Cork appear in any other stories. Nelson Cork is mentioned in one other story, the Drones Club short story "The Fat of the Land" (1958), and a club member with a name similar to Percy Wimbolt, Percy Wimbush, is also mentioned in that story.

Plot

A Bean (a nondescript Drones Club member) is recuperating from an injury in a nursing home. He is playing halma with a nurse when a Crumpet comes to visit and says that everyone is trying figure out "the great Hat mystery" involving Percy Wimbolt and Nelson Cork. The Crumpet explains by recounting the following story.

Percy, who is large, and Nelson, who is small, each want to buy a bespoke top hat from Bodmin, a hatter renowned for always making hats that fit. The two Drones meet at Bodmin's door. Percy is in love with a petite girl named Elizabeth Bottsworth, and wants a new top hat to impress her. Similarly, Nelson wants a new top hat to impress a tall girl named Diana Punter.

At home a few days later, Percy sees Bodmin's delivery boy and another boy playing with hats from the delivery boy's boxes. Percy shouts at them, and the boys run off, leaving a hat-box on Percy's steps. Percy takes the hat and goes to see Elizabeth. She claims his hat is too small, but Percy has faith in Bodmin's hats and is certain she is wrong. Appalled by her criticism of Bodmin's hat, Percy leaves. Elsewhere, Diana says Nelson's hat is too large. Nelson thinks it is impossible for any hat from Bodmin not to fit and questions Diana's eyesight. They argue, and Nelson bitterly goes to the Drones Club, where he finds Percy. They agree that girls do not understand hats, though Nelson tries to defend Elizabeth, whom he has always admired, and Percy defends Diana, whom he has always thought highly of. They leave the club, each taking his hat from the cloak-room.

Nelson tries talking with Elizabeth to help her reconcile with Percy, but he becomes romantically interested in her. She praises his hat, which she says fits him well. The same occurs with Percy and Diana. Eventually, Elizabeth becomes engaged to Nelson, and Diana gets engaged to Percy. The Crumpet and Bean are happy for the couples but cannot understand why Elizabeth and Diana perceived Percy and Nelson's hats differently. The Bean's nurse suggests that the delivery boy got the hats mixed, and then each man got the correct hat from the club cloak-room; the Crumpet finds this idea ingenious but unlikely, and instead believes it was somehow due to the incomprehensible Fourth Dimension, which the Bean agrees with.

=== "Goodbye to All Cats" ===
- US: Cosmopolitan, November 1934 (as "Good-by to All Cats")
- UK: Strand, December 1934 (as "Good-bye to All Cats")

The title of the story is a pun on the title of Robert Graves's 1929 book Good-Bye to All That.

Plot

At the Drones Club, a kitten wanders into the smoking-room, upsetting Freddie Widgeon. A knowledgeable Crumpet tells an Egg and a Bean that Freddie cannot stand cats. The Crumpet explains by narrating the following story.

Freddie is courting Dahlia Prenderby and hopes to marry her. He goes with Dahlia to the Prenderby country house, Matcham Scratchings, to meet her parents, Sir Mortimer Prenderby and Lady Prenderby. They have many cats and dogs. A tortoiseshell cat stands on and kneads a shirt Freddie left on his bed, annoying Freddie. He flings the cat off the balcony, and the cat ends up hitting Sir Mortimer. Freddie apologizes but Sir Mortimer is not pleased about being hit.

At dinner with Dahlia, her parents, and various aunts, Freddie tries to make conversation by talking enthusiastically about hunting to Lady Prenderby, but she strongly disapproves. He later accidentally runs into a cat, steps on another cat, and sits on a third cat. Dahlia acts coldly towards Freddie, claiming he dislikes animals. In his bedroom, Freddie looks under the furniture to check for cats. He finds none but is surprised by an unfriendly Alsatian dog (a German Shepherd) on his bed. The dog growls and jumps at Freddie, who flees onto a wardrobe. Freddie is saved by a Pekingese puppy that scares off the Alsatian, and rewards it with his tie. Chewing it and shaking it, the puppy hits its head on the leg of the bed and makes a series of shrieks. The dog quickly recovers, but there is a knock at Freddie's door. It is Biggleswade, the butler, who was told to rescue the puppy from Freddie. Biggleswade has been instructed to strike Freddie with a poker if Freddie resists. Freddie opens the door and sees Lady Prenderby, Dahlia, some aunts, and Biggleswade, with poker.

Though Freddie tries to explain, nobody listens. Biggleswade is told to stay in the hall with his poker to make sure Freddie does not harm anyone. Returning to his room, Freddie is alarmed to find a dead cat in his bed. Freddie thinks of sneaking it to the drawing-room where it would be found later, but this proves impossible as Biggleswade remains at his post. Left with no other options, Freddie throws it off the balcony, again inadvertently hitting Sir Mortimer. Freddie is ejected from the house and has no hope of reconciling with Dahlia. He is through with cats.

=== "The Luck of the Stiffhams" ===
- US: Cosmopolitan, November 1933
- UK: Strand, March 1934

Plot

At the Drones, Pongo Twistleton buys drinks for everyone after winning a bet against Oofy Prosser. Oofy had bet that Adolphus "Stiffy" Stiffham would never marry Geraldine Spettisbury. Stiffy was employed as secretary by Geraldine's father, the Earl of Wivelscombe, and Lord Wivelscombe did not want his daughter to marry a secretary. Wivelscombe, upon finding the couple in his garden in a close embrace, kicked Stiffy and fired him. A Crumpet tells two Eggs that Stiffy went to American to make his fortune there, and recounts the rest of the story.

In New York, Stiffy agrees to bet "ten" in a game of craps, thinking he is betting ten dollars though the other man really meant ten thousand. Stiffy's luck prevails, and he ultimately wins the equivalent of thirty thousand pounds. He deposits the money in a bank. After celebrating with friends, he wakes up disoriented, and goes to his bank. The bank has closed its doors. Without the money, Stiffy has no hope of marrying Geraldine. Feeling he has nothing to lose, he sends an insulting letter to Wivelscombe. Stiffy then learns from the manager of his hotel that the bank is closed only because it is Sunday. Stiffy did not realize this, since he slept through Saturday. Stiffy returns to England intending to take his letter from Wivelscombe's table before Wivelscombe can read it.

Outside Wivelscombe's house, Stiffy throws gravel at Geraldine's window to get her attention, but misses and hits the Earl's window instead. Wivelscombe spots Stiffy. Wivelscombe, who is in an overwrought state (he has a hangover), believes he has seen the ghost of Stiffy. Wivelscombe tells this to Geraldine. Annoyed, she replies that if anything did happen to Stiffy, it is Wivelscombe's fault. Later, Stiffy grabs his letter from Wivelscombe's table, and hides under the table when he hears footsteps. Gascoigne and Wivelscombe enter. Gascoigne reproaches Wivelscombe for having drunk champagne, and does not believe him when Wivelscombe, seeing Stiffy, says that there is a ghost under the table. When Gascoigne looks under the table, Stiffy surreptitiously bribes him. Gascoigne reports that there is nothing there.

Stiffy meets with Geraldine in her room, and hides in the cupboard when Wivelscombe enters. Wivelscombe says he saw the ghost go into the cupboard, but Geraldine denies seeing anyone there. She convinces her father that the vision is not a ghost but a warning that something will happen to Stiffy if he is not allowed to return and marry her. To get rid of the ghost, Wivelscombe approves the marriage. The couple is now married. The Crumpet notes that Pongo Twistleton's faith in the Luck of the Sitffhams has been rewarded at Oofy Prosser's expense.

=== "Noblesse Oblige" ===
- US: Cosmopolitan, September 1934
- UK: Strand, November 1934

Plot

At the Drones, Freddie Widgeon is in a bad mood. A Crumpet says that Freddie lost the girl he loved, which often happens to Freddie, and Freddie's allowance was cut in half. The Crumpet explains by narrating the following story.

Freddie accompanies his uncle, Lord Blicester, who pays Freddie his allowance, to Cannes. Freddie is in love with a girl named Drusilla, who is also at Cannes. She opposes gambling, so Freddie tells her that he never gambles. Having taken a gold and lavender tie from his uncle's effects, Freddie is dressed impressively, and a stranger offers him five hundred francs to judge a Peasant Mothers Baby Competition. Freddie is flattered but declines.

A shabby-looking man claims to recognize Freddie from school. Freddie does not recognize him, but is moved when the man says that Freddie was his hero. The man asks him for a meal. Freddie misunderstands, thinking the man is asking for a mille, meaning a thousand francs, about equivalent to ten pounds (a lot of money at the time). Freddie remembers that he is about to receive ten pounds from a friend, and feels compelled by his sense of noblesse oblige to give this to the man. Freddie arranges to meet him later.

Freddie's ten-pound cheque arrives. He runs into a bookmaker to whom he owes money, and pays him four-fifty francs. To make up the loss, Freddie agrees to judge the baby competition. He selects a winner, and is then told he is actually expected to pay five hundred francs for judging the competition. Freddie is now left with fifty francs. He tries to get money from his uncle, who is playing chemin-de-fer at the Casino, but Blicester refuses. Blicester takes the role of "banker" in the game and stakes a thousand francs, called the "bank"; Freddie says "Banco", meaning he will match the "bank". Freddie scores a nine (the highest possible score) and wins the thousand francs. Blicester is displeased, and Freddie is scorned by Drusilla, who has seen him gambling.

Freddie redeems his counters, and gives the money to the shabby-looking man, who is surprised, as he only expected around fifty francs. Freddie realizes his mistake, but his honour keeps him from trying to get any money back. When the man addresses him as Postlethwaite, Freddie states his name is Widgeon. The man says he thought Freddie was Postlethwaite, as he is wearing their old school tie. The man laughs at the mix-up and then hurries off. Freddie uses his remaining fifty francs to drink cocktails at the Casino before he has to face his uncle.

=== "Uncle Fred Flits By" ===
- US: Redbook, July 1935
- UK: Strand, December 1935

See "Uncle Fred Flits By". (Drones Club story with Pongo Twistleton and Uncle Fred.)

=== "Archibald and the Masses" ===
- US: Cosmopolitan, August 1935
- UK: Strand, February 1936

The characters Archibald Mulliner, Aurelia Cammarleigh, and Meadowes previously appeared in "The Reverent Wooing of Archibald".

Plot

After the topic of socialism comes up at the Angler's Rest, Mr Mulliner tells the following story about his nephew, Drones Club member Archibald Mulliner.

Archibald Mulliner, who can imitate a hen laying an egg, is engaged to Aurelia Cammarleigh. Archibald is rich and lives in a fashionable part of London. One day, he is stopped by a seedy-looking stranger who asks for money to buy bread, though he actually wants to buy alcohol. Archibald gives him five pounds and starts thinking seriously about life. Later, he tells his valet Meadowes that there are people who don't have bread. Meadowes, a member of a revolutionary group, tells Archibald that there is indeed poverty in parts of London like Bottleton East, and gives Archibald some pamphlets. Within two weeks, Archibald is converted to socialist views. While with Aurelia, he broods on the situation in Bottleton East. Aurelia is upset that Archibald has become so serious and has stopped doing his entertaining hen-imitation. Archibald talks about politics and plans to visit Bottleton East the following evening. Aurelia is annoyed and says she will end their engagement if he does not come see her the next day instead.

Archibald visits Bottleton East to sympathize with the masses. He is disappointed to find it bright and jovial. Children are playing hop-scotch, not asking for bread. Archibald is determined to give bread to a child and buys a loaf for a small boy. The boy is vexed, since he had hoped for sweets, and throws the loaf at Archibald. Next, Archibald goes into a pub and tells the shirt-sleeved man behind the counter that he will buy a round for everyone. Archibald becomes very popular, until he is unable to pay because his wallet is gone. He believes he left it at the baker's shop. Archibald gets thrown out and then runs away. He now hates the masses and wants to return to Mayfair, but does not know the way. After wandering around, he is hungry and finds a pub where he can eat. He exchanges his locket for a meal. After he eats, a drunk man gets angry at him for wearing a collar and not eating his fat. The shirt-sleeved man comes and is surprised to see Archibald again. Archibald had travelled in a circle and come to the same pub. Crashing resounds through the room and Archibald escapes again. Around three in the morning in Mayfair, Archibald imitates a hen beneath Aurelia's window. This irritates the neighbours and a constable grabs Archibald's shoulder. Archibald punches the policeman and repeats his imitation to get Aurelia's attention. She notices him and is delighted. The policeman grabs him again and assures him he will get fourteen days without the option of a fine. Aurelia promises she will be waiting for Archibald when he comes out.

=== "The Code of the Mulliners" ===
- US: Cosmopolitan, February 1935
- UK: Strand, April 1935

Plot

A discussion about a breach of promise case leads to Mr Mulliner talking about the code of the Mulliners, which states that en engagement cannot be broken off by the male contracting party. He tells the following story about his nephew Archibald.

Archibald Mulliner is happily engaged to Aurelia Cammarleigh. However, her manner becomes cold. Archibald's mother, Lady Wilhelmina Mulliner, is friends with Aurelia, so Archibald goes to ask her about it. He is about to approach Lady Mulliner when he sees her stick her tongue out and repeat "QX" over and over again. Archibald believes Aurelia must have seen his mother having one of these spells and thought she was loony. Archibald feels he cannot marry Aurelia if there is insanity in his family. The code of the Mulliners prevents him from breaking their engagement himself. He plans to make Aurelia want to break their engagement by insulting her father, Sir Rackstraw Cammarleigh, to whom Archibald has always been deferential. Archibald has dinner with Aurelia and her parents. Sir Rackstraw, who often tells the same stories, begins telling one and asks Archibald casually to stop him if he's told it before. He is surprised when Archibald does stop him, saying that he has heard the story six times and that it is a rotten story. Lady Cammerleigh thanks Archibald, since she has put up with her husband's stories for a long time but not been brave enough to say anything. Aurelia and the butler Bagshot feel the same way and thank Archibald. Sir Rackstraw realizes he has become a bore, and also thanks Archibald. Aurelia was cold before because Archibald was so meek towards her father. She is now happy and wants to dine with him at the Savoy the next day.

Archibald's next idea for getting Aurelia to break the engagement is to find an actress to pretend to be a wronged ex-fiancée of his. On his way to a theatrical agent, he bumps into Yvonne Maltravers, an affable and stout young actress. Archibald tells her about his situation, and she helps come up with the plan. She will appear at the Savoy as an ex-fiancée bringing a breach of promise case against Archibald. Archibald goes to meet Aurelia at the Savoy, nervous about the scene about to unfold because his friends and many gossip columnists are dining there. Archibald sees his mother at the restaurant, and Aurelia remarks that she looks better since she started her "QX" exercises, which make the chin and neck thinner. Lady Cammerleigh learned about the exercise from Aurelia. Now that he knows this, Archibald talks to Yvonne before she can approach him and Aurelia. She speaks in a hush, having lost her voice from doing "QX" exercises. Archibald tells her the plan is off anyway and he will send her a cheque. Archibald tells Aurelia that he wants a spare bishop for their wedding, in case the first one strains his voice doing this popular neck exercise.

=== "The Fiery Wooing of Mordred" ===
- US: Cosmopolitan, December 1934
- UK: Strand, February 1935

Plot

After someone complains about a young man who started a fire at the Angler's Rest by throwing his cigarette into a wastepaper basket, Mr Mulliner tells the following story about his nephew, Mordred.

Mordred Mulliner, a poet, goes to the dentist. In the waiting room, he meets Annabelle Sprockett-Sprockett, daughter of Sir Murgatroyd and Lady Aurelia Sprockett-Sprockett of Smattering Hall, Worcestershire. Mordred falls in love with her immediately. Annabelle rarely gets to visit London and wants more time for window-shopping, so Mordred gives her his earlier appointment. When she is done and returns to the waiting room, he throws his cigarette into the wastepaper basket. This startles Annabelle and he retrieves the cigarette, explaining that he is absent-minded and often throws cigarettes into wastepaper baskets. He has burned two flats already this year. The next day, Mordred receives a letter from Lady Sprockett-Sprockett. She is grateful for Mordred's kindness towards Annabelle and invites him to visit. Mordred happily sends a telegram accepting the invitation. At Smattering Hall, Mordred is discouraged when he sees that there are six other young unmarried men there, all impressive and handsome. The Sprockett-Sprockett family is genial towards Mordred and provide him with plenty of cigarettes, but he is too concerned about his rivals to be cheerful.

At night, Sir Murgatroyd accompanies him to his room and makes sure he has enough cigarettes, as well as other things he might need like paper and a wastepaper basket. Mordred smokes a cigarette and writes a poem about Annabelle. This takes many attempts and the wastepaper basket fills with discarded sheets. He takes a stroll outside, then notices that his bedroom curtains are on fire. He shouts, and the other young men efficiently put out the fire. Mordred fumbles with buckets of water and only gets in the way. He explains how the fire started and fears that he is no longer welcome. He tells Sir Murgatroyd he will leave on the next train. Since his bed is ruined, he tries to sleep on a couch in the library. Annabelle and her parents enter the library. Mordred, who is not wearing slippers, is too modest to reveal his presence in front of Annabelle with bare feet. He hears their conversation and learns that they wanted him to burn the house down. They hoped to stop losing money on it and collect insurance money. Sir Murgatroyd hates the six young men for putting the fire out. Annabelle confesses that she fell in love with Mordred in the dentist's waiting room and will not marry anyone else. This is too much for Mordred and he suddenly reveals his presence, surprising them. He gets engaged to Annabelle, and suggests that they use paraffin to start another fire. They will claim that the previous fire had not been extinguished completely. Annabelle proposes using paper and shavings too. Mordred finds his slippers and they go hand-in-hand to get the materials.

== Style ==
Wodehouse's stories use vivid imagery which involves similes and metaphors that draw from a wide range of literary and cultural sources. These comparisons seem to be highly incongruous at first glance, yet are appropriate to the particular situation. For example, the Crumpet describes the beautiful but stern Drusilla in "Noblesse Oblige": "I received the impression of a sort of blend of Tallulah Bankhead and a policewoman". Also, in "The Amazing Hat Mystery", the Crumpet states the following: "Talking to Elizabeth Bottsworth had always been like bellowing down a well in the hope of attracting the attention of one of the lesser infusoria at the bottom". A third example can be seen in "The Luck of the Stiffhams", when Lord Wivelscombe is experiencing a hangover: "He was in an overwrought state when a fly treading a little too heavily on the carpet is enough to make a man think he's one of the extras in All Quiet On The Western Front".

In Wodehouse's stories, syntactic and lexical ambiguities often result in misunderstandings between characters that lead to comic interactions. This occurs in "The Amazing Hat Mystery", when Percy interprets Nelson's use of the word "abroad" as meaning "in foreign parts", rather than "in the land":

"There is lawlessness and licence abroad."
"And here in England too."
"Well, naturally, you silly ass," said Nelson, with some asperity. "When I said abroad, I didn't mean abroad, I meant abroad".

Parallel constructions are sometimes used in Wodehouse's stories, resulting in comic incongruous contradictions. An example of this occurs in "The Luck of the Stiffhams" (when Wivelscombe tells Geraldine he has seen a ghost):

"You look as if you had seen a ghost."
"I have seen a ghost."
"The White Lady of Wivelscombe?"
"No, the Pink Secretary of Wivelscombe."

One of the stylistic devices used in Wodehouse's stories to create humour is the pun. A pun plays a large role in "Noblesse Oblige", as the story depends on the similarity in pronunciation between the French mille and the English meal, as shown in the following quote from the story:

"But you said you had to have a mille."
"And a meal is just what I am going to have," replied the chap, enthusiastically.

Some of Wodehouse's characters have names that give humorous effects in pronunciation, one example being Freddie Widgeon's uncle Lord Blicester (pronounced "blister"), who first appears in "Noblesse Oblige".

== Publication history ==
In the Strand (UK), Gilbert Wilkinson illustrated "Tried in the Furnace", "Trouble Down at Tudsleigh", "The Amazing Hat Mystery", "Goodbye to All Cats", "The Luck of the Stiffhams", "Noblesse Oblige", "Archibald and the Masses", "The Code of the Mulliners", and "The Fiery Wooing of Mordred". Treyer Evans illustrated "Fate".

In Cosmopolitan (US), Mario Cooper illustrated "Tried in the Furnace", "The Amazing Hat Mystery", "The Luck of the Stiffhams", "Noblesse Oblige", and "Archibald and the Masses". James Montgomery Flagg illustrated "Fate", "Trouble Down at Tudsleigh", "Goodbye to All Cats", and "The Code of the Mulliners". "The Fiery Wooing of Mordred" was illustrated by Robert O. Reed.

"Goodbye to All Cats" and "The Fiery Wooing of Mordred" were included in the 1939 collection Week-End Wodehouse (UK edition), "Tried in the Furnace" and "Archibald and the Masses" were featured in the 1939 collection The Week-End Wodehouse (US edition). "Tried in the Furnace" and "Trouble Down at Tudsleigh" were part of the 1949 collection The Best of Wodehouse, edited by Scott Meredith. "Tried in the Furnace", "The Amazing Hat Mystery", "Goodbye to All Cats", and "Noblesse Oblige" were collected in The Most of P. G. Wodehouse, published in 1960.

"The Fiery Wooing of Mordred" was included in the 1981 collection Wodehouse on Crime. "Tried in the Furnace" and "The Amazing Hat Mystery" were included in the 1978 collection Vintage Wodehouse, a collection edited by Richard Usborne. A collection of clergy-related Wodehouse stories titled The World of Wodehouse Clergy, published in 1984, featured "Tried in the Furnace". "The Amazing Hat Mystery", "Goodbye to All Cats", and "Archibald and the Masses" were featured in P. G. Wodehouse Short Stories, published in 1985 by The Folio Society and illustrated by George Adamson.

The first eight stories in the collection were included in the 1982 omnibus Tales from the Drones Club. The last three stories were included in the 1972 collection The World of Mr. Mulliner.

"Tried in the Furnace" was published in the periodical Book of the Week Club, a supplement to the Syracuse Herald, on 19 September 1937, along with another Wodehouse story, The Medicine Girl. "The Fiery Wooing of Mordred" was included in the anthology Modern Short Stories, published by J. M. Dent in 1939. "The Amazing Hat Mystery" was featured in the 1939 anthology Jackdaw's Nest: A Fivefold Anthology, edited by Gerald William Bullett. "Tried in the Furnace" was included in the 1942 anthology A Treasury of British Humor, edited by Morris Bishop and published by Coward-McCann. The book The Week-End Book of Humor, with stories selected by Wodehouse and Scott Meredith, included "Trouble Down at Tudsleigh", which was the only Wodehouse story featured in the book. This collection was published in 1952 in the US and 1954 in the UK, and was reissued with the alternate title P. G. Wodehouse Selects the Best of Humor in the US in 1965, and as P. G. Wodehouse Selects the Best of Humour in the UK in 1966.

== Adaptations ==
Richard Usborne adapted "The Amazing Hat Mystery" into a radio drama, which was broadcast on the BBC Home Service on 25 April 1962. Produced by Rayner Heppenstall, "The Amazing Hat Mystery" featured Ronald Baddiley as Percy Wimbolt, David Enders as Nelson Cork, Denise Bryer as Elizabeth Bottsworth, and Mary Wimbush as Diana Punter.

"Trouble Down at Tudsleigh", "The Luck of the Stiffhams", and "The Code of the Mulliners" were adapted as episodes of the television series Wodehouse Playhouse (1974–1978).

"Goodbye to All Cats" was read by John Alderton for an episode of BBC One's five-episode Welcome to Wodehouse series. The episode was broadcast on 5 February 1982.

== See also ==
- List of short stories by P. G. Wodehouse, categorised by series

== References and sources ==
Sources

- McIlvaine, Eileen; Sherby, Louise S.; Heineman, James H. (1990). P. G. Wodehouse: A Comprehensive Bibliography and Checklist. New York: James H. Heineman Inc. ISBN 978-0-87008-125-5.
- Midkiff, Neil. "The Wodehouse short stories". P. G. Wodehouse pages.
- Wodehouse, P. G. (2009) [1936]. Young Men in Spats (Reprinted ed.). London: Arrow Books. ISBN 9780099514039.
