= Lord Emsworth and Others =

1937 short story collection by P. G. Wodehouse

- First edition
- Author: P. G. Wodehouse
- Language: English
- Publisher: Herbert Jenkins
- Publication date: 19 March 1937
- Publication place: United Kingdom

Lord Emsworth and Others is a collection of nine short stories by P. G. Wodehouse, first published in the United Kingdom on 19 March 1937 by Herbert Jenkins, London; it was not published in the United States. The Crime Wave at Blandings, which was published on 25 June 1937 by Doubleday, Doran, New York, is a very different collection, sharing only three of its seven titles with the UK book. Penguin Books published a UK edition of The Crime Wave at Blandings in 1966. The stories in both books had all previously appeared in both British and American magazines.

Lord Emsworth and Others contains one story set at Blandings Castle, three golf stories narrated by the Oldest Member, one story featuring Drones Club member Freddie Widgeon, one tale narrated by Mr Mulliner, and three Ukridge stories.

The Crime Wave at Blandings contains the Blandings, Mulliner and Freddie Widgeon stories, to which were added two more Drones stories, a Bingo Little story, and a novella, "The Medicine Girl", which had been published separately in the UK as Doctor Sally (1932).

== Contents ==
=== "The Crime Wave at Blandings" ===
- US: Saturday Evening Post, 10 & 17 October 1936
- UK: Strand, January 1937 (as "Crime Wave at Blandings")

See "The Crime Wave at Blandings". (Blandings Castle story.)

=== "Buried Treasure" ===
- UK: Strand, September 1936
- US: This Week, 27 September 1936 (as "Hidden Treasure")

Mr Mulliner's nephew Brancepeth wants to marry his beloved Muriel, but hasn't a sou to do it on, so her father Lord Bromborough is forcing her to marry the boob of the first water Edwin Potter (heir of Potter's Potted Meats). Bromborough has a weakness, though: his great moustache Joyeuse, which he compares favorably to Love in Idleness, the facial decoration of Potter's father Sir Preston. Having been invited to Rumpling Hall to paint a portrait of Lord Bromborough, Brancepeth realizes that if he can turn a moustachless Bromborough into an animated cartoon in Hollywood, fame, fortune, and Muriel are his.

=== "The Letter of the Law" ===
- UK: Strand, April 1936
- US: Red Book, April 1936 (as "Not Out of Distance")

The President's Cup and the love of Gwendoline Poskitt occasion the only time the Oldest Member ever saw profit from driving into anyone. Young Wilmot Byng loves Gwendoline, but has recently smitten her father (a member of the Wrecking Crew) a juicy one on the leg for holding up play. To win her hand, the Oldest Member recommends that Wilmot appease Poskitt, and he does so—up to the day of the President's Cup match. In that match, Poskitt plays well above form, but ends up in match play against Wadsworth Hemmingway, an ex-lawyer-turned-golfer who carries the Book of Rules in his bag and makes it his best club. With one swing, Wilmot ensures that Poskitt gets the Cup and Wilmot gets his bride.

=== "Farewell to Legs" ===
- US: This Week, 14 July 1935 (omitting Oldest Member introduction)
- UK: Strand, May 1936

The title is a play on Ernest Hemingway's 1929 novel, A Farewell to Arms.

The betrothal of Evangeline Brackett to Angus McTavish is built, in large part, on the way she bites her lip and rolls her eyes when she tops her drive, says the Oldest Member. But when Legs Mortimer takes up residence in the Clubhouse, Evangeline's mind wanders from her golf, and Angus worries that she is losing her form for the Ladies' Medal. But the scales fall from Evangeline's eyes when Legs does the unthinkable on the links.

=== "There's Always Golf" ===
- US: Red Book, February 1936 (as "A Triple Threat Man")
- UK: Strand, March 1936

Clarice Fitch was a force to be reckoned with, recalls the Oldest Member, and weedy, bespectacled accountant Ernest Plinlimmon is powerfully affected by the impact of her personality. But like hundreds of others, he escapes her notice, until he encounters her on the eighteenth fairway, needing a four to win the Medals Competition. But she is not playing—she is tying her shoelace. When a forceful woman comes between a man and a coveted tournament medal, she sees the true depths of his soul.

=== "The Masked Troubadour" ===
- US: Saturday Evening Post, 28 November 1936 (as "Reggie and the Greasy Bird", with different setting & characters)
- UK: Strand, December 1936

"Reggie and the Greasy Bird" is a rewritten version of the story with different characters, created because Wodehouse needed the money for his taxes.

At the Drones Club, two Beans see Freddie Widgeon handing money to a greasy-looking man. A Crumpet explains that the man, Jos. Waterbury, is a professional pianist, and Freddie feels obliged to give him money occasionally. The Crumpet tells the following story.

Freddie has lunch with his uncle, Lord Blicester (pronounced "blister"). Blicester has invited his friend Lady Pinfold and her daughter Dora to lunch. He wants Freddie to marry Dora. Freddie falls in love with Dora. She volunteers at a sort of Mission where they are putting on an entertainment. Freddie sings for the event, accompanied by Dora on the piano. He is a hit and invites the audience to return in a week for buns and cocoa. However, he does not have enough money to pay for the food. His uncle gives him ten pounds, but Freddie thinks he needs more. At the Drones, Freddie sees a kid, Barmy Fotheringay-Phipps's cousin Egbert. Fellow Drone Catsmeat Potter-Pirbright says that Egbert can hit anything with a Brazil nut fired from a catapult. Freddie bets Catsmeat five pounds that Egbert cannot shoot the hat off an old gentleman leaving a cab. Freddie loses the bet, and sees that it was Blicester whose hat was knocked off. Incidentally, Blicester came to get two pounds ten shillings back.

Freddie decides to sing in an East End music hall's Amateur Night to win the five-pound prize. He pays Waterbury five shillings to be his accompanist. Blicester is nearby, so Freddie disguises himself with a mask and calls himself The Masked Troubadour. Freddie sings well, but a red-headed man in the audience, "Ginger" Murphy, recognizes Waterbury. He throws an egg at Waterbury, which misses. They argue and a food fight breaks out. Waterbury flees to a pub, where Freddie and Murphy follow. A bar-room brawl ensues. Outside, Blicester sees Freddie get thrown out. When he grabs Freddie's arm, Freddie mistakes him for a brawler and hits him in the midriff before rejoining the brawl. The next day, Blicester decides to send Freddie away to the country for a few weeks. Freddie calls Dora and tells her everything; she hangs up on him. Waterbury thanks Freddie for saving him in the brawl, and plays on Freddie's sympathy to get some money from him.

The version titled "Reggie and the Greasy Bird" features Reggie Mumford and is very similar to the Freddie Widgeon version. Reggie is a member of the Junior Rotters Club instead of the Drones, where his fellow member is Beano Bagshot rather than Catsmeat. His uncle is Lord Uppingham, and the girl he falls for is Constance Rackstraw. At the Amateur Night competition, he is accompanied by the greasy-looking pianist Sid Montrose. Ginger Murphy's name is not changed.

=== "Ukridge and the Home from Home" ===
- US: Cosmopolitan, February 1931
- UK: Strand, June 1931

Ukridge arrives at his friend James Corcoran's house at 3 a.m., dressed in his pyjamas and mackintosh. He relates to his friend how he had been left in charge of his Aunt Julia's house, and had come up with the ingenious idea of renting out rooms to an exclusive clientele of boarders while she was away.

For a time the plan goes smoothly. With the staff bribed to help, he fills the house with paying guests, and rakes in their money while playing the gracious host. However, meeting an old friend of his Aunt's, he hears she is returning sooner than expected, and tries to think of a way to get rid of the guests before their contracted stays are up.

After a plot to imply the drainage in the house is faulty fails, Ukridge decides to claim the house is infected with Scarlet fever, but receiving a telegram from his aunt saying she will arrive in Paris the following week, and knowing a trip there always takes his aunt a few weeks, decides to delay shutting down his plan to grab a few more weeks rent.

Soon after, the house is aroused by shooting. One of guests, the retired Lieutenant-Colonel B. B. Bagnew, convinced he has seen a burglar, opened fire with his service revolver. Ukridge calms the house, but on retiring to bed, finds Aunt Julia hiding in the cupboard, convinced the butler has gone insane. Ukridge attempts to smuggle her out of the house, but she insists on getting some things from her bedroom. Entering the room, she disturbs the guest staying there, who screams; the Colonel rushes in and opens fire once more. Ukridge, taking advantage of the confusion, grabs his coat and slips away, ending up at his friend's bedside in the small hours of the night.

=== "The Come-back of Battling Billson" ===
- US: Cosmopolitan, June 1935
- UK: Strand, July 1935

Corky, having had a story idea turned down by Hollywood, attacks the talking picture, but his friend Ukridge comes to its defence. He has, he says, always had a special affection for the talkies. He tells his friend why...

About to be left alone once more at his Aunt Julia's house, Ukridge realises he can make some quick cash by renting out the lawns to a party of folk dancers. Of course, Aunt Julia's trip is unexpectedly cancelled, and Ukridge needs some cash to pay back the dancers, who are upset at having their party cancelled at the last minute.

Ukridge sets up a bout for "Battling" Billson, using the man's desire to wed his girl Flossie to persuade him to take part. Finding Billson's training methods (mostly involving ale and cigars) somewhat lacking, Ukridge inveigles the big boxer into his Aunt's house as an odd-job man, allowing him to personally supervise the training regime. His aunt is a little nonplussed, but is soon persuaded everything is alright.

The training continues apace, but Billson seems to be benefitting little. His waist expands and his wind does not. The butler Oakshott, it emerges, having wowed Billson with his dignified manner, is now plying the boxer with an excess of food, cigars and port. Ukridge has just discovered that the conniving butler has money on Billson's opponent in the upcoming bout, when Aunt Julia learns of Ukridge's dance scheme, and throws him out of the house. He tries to persuade Billson to leave with him, but the big man resolutely refuses.

Ukridge, seeing disaster loom, fetches Flossie to the house to talk some sense into Billson. They find he has gone to the movie theatre with the butler, and hasten down there, but Flossie is as weak before the butler's fatherly gaze as Billson himself. All four of them end up in the cinema, at a screening of The Jazz Singer. When the talking starts up, Billson is enraged, calling loudly for quiet in the cinema. The audience reacts strongly, fighting ensues, and Billson is hauled off to jail for two weeks. He emerges trim and in top form, easily besting his opponent in the ring.

=== "The Level Business Head" ===
- UK: Strand, May 1926
- US: Liberty 8 May 1926

Corky is surprised to find himself dining at Ukridge's Aunt Julia's house, where he is not usually welcome; Ukridge explains that he has recently acquired a certain degree of power over his aunt, thanks to his having pawned her brooch. He explains...

Ukridge runs into Joe the Lawyer, a notorious bookmaker, and is offered the chance to buy a half-share in a dog with excellent prospects. Ukridge can't afford the stake £50, of course, so at first refuses, but later that day Aunt Julia, about to depart on yet another tour, tasks him with collecting her brooch from a jeweller's and locking it safely in her desk. He pawns the brooch, and hands the cash over to Joe the Lawyer. The next day, Joe informs him that the dog has died and offers to reimburse him £5, leaving Ukridge considerably short of the money he needs to buy back the brooch.

Angelica Vining, a friend of Aunt Julia's, arrives having been told she can borrow the brooch and lent the key to the drawer, but Ukridge pockets the key and sends the woman away. He heads to Lewes races to rake back some money, and there meets Joe the Lawyer once more. He tries to borrow money from him, but is refused, and learns that Joe has raffled the dead dog for a considerable sum. He gets a lift with Joe to the next race meet at Sandown Park Racecourse, as a favour.

On the way, the car overheats and breaks down. Visiting a nearby house to fetch water, they find it guarded by a fearsome dog; Joe, afraid of dogs, drops his bag full of money in the garden as he flees. Ukridge sees that the dog is harmless, and tells Joe he will retrieve the bag for £50, an offer which Joe accepts, but while Ukridge is playing merrily with the dog, Joe grabs the bag himself, and refuses to pay.

When Joe goes off to find water elsewhere, Ukridge meets the owner of the house, and buys his dog from him for 5 shillings. He puts the dog in the car, and when Joe returns and finds he cannot get into his car, Ukridge offers to sell him the dog, for £100. He then charges a further £50 to remove the dog from the car, returns it to its previous owner, and returns home with his pockets full.

Aunt Julia, returning in a rage at hearing her friend has been refused the loan of her brooch, tells Ukridge she is sure he has pawned it; she makes him force open the drawer, and is deflated to find it sitting there, having been returned just in time, giving Ukridge an advantage over his distrustful aunt.

== Publication history ==
The Blandings, Mulliner and Freddie Widgeon stories in Lord Emsworth and Others (UK) also appeared in the US collection The Crime Wave at Blandings. The three Oldest Member stories had already appeared in the US edition of Young Men in Spats (1936), and the three Ukridge stories were included in the US edition of Eggs, Beans and Crumpets (1940). The three short stories which replaced them in The Crime Wave at Blandings were "Tried in the Furnace" (from the UK edition of Young Men in Spats), and "All's Well with Bingo" and "Romance at Droitgate Spa" (both of which appeared in the UK edition of Eggs, Beans and Crumpets).

In The Strand Magazine (UK), Gilbert Wilkinson illustrated "Buried Treasure", "The Letter of the Law", "Farewell to Legs", "There's Always Golf", "The Masked Troubadour", and "The Come-back of Battling Billson". Also in the Strand, "Ukridge and the Home from Home" was illustrated by Treyer Evans, and "The Level Business Head" was illustrated by Reginald Cleaver.

In Red Book (US), "The Letter of the Law" and "There's Always Golf" were illustrated by James Montgomery Flagg, and Flagg illustrated "Ukridge and the Home from Home" in Cosmopolitan. "The Come-back of Battling Billson" was illustrated by Robert O. Reid in Cosmopolitan. In This Week, C. C. Beall illustrated "Buried Treasure". "Farewell to Legs" was illustrated by Harry Beckhoff in This Week. "Reggie and the Greasy Bird" was illustrated by H. R. Ballinger in the Saturday Evening Post. "The Level Business Head" was published in Liberty with illustrations by Wallace Morgan.

"The Level Business Head" was published in the Family Herald and Weekly Star (Montreal, Canada) on 22 May 1935. It was also published in the Toronto Star Weekly on 25 May 1935, with illustrations by James H. Hammon.

"The Masked Troubadour" was included in the American edition of the 1939 collection The Week-End Wodehouse. "Buried Treasure" was included in Week-End Wodehouse (UK edition), published in 1939. "The Letter of the Law" and "There's Always Golf" (as "There's Always Golf!") were included in the 1940 collection Wodehouse on Golf, published by Doubleday, Doran & Company, New York. The 1949 collection The Best of Wodehouse (US) featured stories selected by Scott Meredith, including "The Level Business Head" and "The Letter of the Law".

"Buried Treasure" was included in the 1972 collection The World of Mr. Mulliner, published by Barrie & Jenkins, London. The collection was first issued in the US in 1974 by the Taplinger Publishing Company. "The Letter of the Law", "Farewell to Legs", and "There's Always Golf", were included in The Golf Omnibus, a collection of Wodehouse's golf stories, published in the UK on 12 April 1973 by Barrie & Jenkins, and in the US on the same date by Simon and Schuster. "Ukridge and the Home from Home", "The Come-back of Battling Billson", and "The Level Business Head" were included in The World of Ukridge, published in 1975 by Barrie & Jenkins.

"The Masked Troubadour" was included in the 1982 collection Tales from the Drones Club. "Ukridge and the Home from Home" appeared in Short Stories (1983), a collection of short stories by Wodehouse selected by Christopher Falkus with illustrations by George Adamson, published by the Folio Society, London. There is one other Ukridge story in the book, "Ukridge's Accident Syndicate". The version of "The Masked Troubadour" titled "Reggie and the Greasy Bird" was featured in Plum Stones (1993).

"Farewell to Legs" was included in the anthology Modern Short Stories, edited by Emma Reppert and published in the US by McGraw in 1939. "The Level Business Head" was printed in the 1953 anthology The Book of Wit & Humor (US).

== Adaptations ==
"Ukridge and the Home from Home" and "The Come-back of Battling Billson" were adapted as episodes of the Ukridge television series in 1968. Ukridge was the second series of the television series The World of Wodehouse.

"The Letter of the Law", "Farewell to Legs", and "There's Always Golf" were adapted for radio by Edward Taylor and Michael Poynton as part of the radio series The Oldest Member. The series was first broadcast on BBC Radio 4 between 1994 and 1999. Maurice Denham starred as the eponymous Oldest Member and narrator.

== See also ==
- List of short stories by P. G. Wodehouse, categorised by series

== References and sources ==
Sources

- Midkiff, Neil. "The Wodehouse short stories".
