= The Exit of Battling Billson =

1923 short story by P. G. Wodehouse

- Short story by P. G. Wodehouse
- Language: English
- Genre: Comedy

Publication
- Publisher: Cosmopolitan (US); Strand (UK)
- Media type: Print (Magazine)
- Publication date: December 1923 (US); January 1924 (UK)

"The Exit of Battling Billson" is a short story by British author P. G. Wodehouse, which first appeared in the United States in the December 1923 issue of Cosmopolitan, and in the United Kingdom in the January 1924 Strand. It features the irrepressible Stanley Featherstonehaugh Ukridge, and was included in the collection Ukridge, published in 1924.

== Plot ==
Corky is in the Welsh town of "Llunindnno" to report on the emergence of a popular revivalist speaker, and is amazed to run into Ukridge outside a theatre - he has been ejected for attacking a man who had stolen his seat, attempting to lift him out by the ears. Ukridge is in town to promote a boxing match between a local man and "Battling" Billson, this time as manager of the affair, sharing the ticket sales with his partner from his failed bookmaking enterprise.

Corky attends the stirring revivalist meeting, and later meets Billson, who was also at the meeting. Billson, swayed by the speaker, has become an advocate of teetotalism and non-violence, and has been disputing drinkers in local pubs. Ukridge, dismayed that Billson refuses to fight, intends to take his place, having made an agreement with the other boxer that he will treat Ukridge gently. When they meet, however, Ukridge recognises the boxer as the man whose ears he pulled.

Sure the other man will break his word, Ukridge is petrified, but when the fight seems to be going well, he assumes the other is merely a poor fighter. When Ukridge hits the other man's nose, breaking the central clause of their deal, the Welshman lets loose, and is on the verge of destroying Ukridge when Billson steps into the ring, determined to end the violence. Ukridge runs off as Billson, enraged by the booing crowd and a few punches from the Welshman, launches into a spectacular fight.

The Welshman's agent arrives at Ukridge's house to collect the money owed, but Ukridge's partner has fled with the takings. When all looks black, Billson arrives, confirming the partner has fled, but carrying the bag of money, which he took from the fleeing man. He hands it over to Ukridge, and strolls off to spread the light.

== Main characters ==
- Stanley Featherstonehaugh Ukridge, the irrepressible entrepreneur
- James Corcoran, Ukridge's writer friend
- "Battling" Billson, a boxer sometimes managed by Ukridge
- Lloyd Thomas, a famous Welsh boxer
- Izzy Previn, aka Isaac O'Brien, Ukridge's untrustworthy business partner

== Publication history ==
The story was illustrated by T. D. Skidmore in Cosmpopolitan. It was illustrated by Reginald Cleaver in The Strand Magazine.

"The Exit of Battling Billson" was the only Wodehouse story included in A Century of Humour, an anthology edited by Wodehouse and published by Hutchinson & Co. in September 1934. It was also collected in The World of Ukridge, published in October 1975 by Barrie & Jenkins.

The 1926 anthology Twenty-Seven Humorous Tales included the story. The anthology was edited by Catherine Amy Dawson Scott and Ernest Rhys, and was published by Hutchinson.

== Adaptations ==
The story was incorporated into the Ukridge radio episode "The Return Of Battling Billson", adapted from the short story "The Return of Battling Billson". It first aired on 18 January 1993.

== See also ==
- List of Wodehouse's Ukridge stories
