= Eggs, Beans and Crumpets =

1940 short story collection by P. G. Wodehouse

First UK edition cover

Eggs, Beans and Crumpets is a collection of short stories by P. G. Wodehouse, first published in the United Kingdom on April 26, 1940, by Herbert Jenkins, London, then with a slightly different content in the United States on May 10, 1940, by Doubleday, Doran, New York.

Most of the stories feature regular characters: Drones Club member Bingo Little, Mr Mulliner, Ukridge and, in the US edition, Freddie Widgeon and the Oldest Member.

The US edition of the book also included "Ukridge and the Home from Home", "The Come-back of Battling Billson", and "The Level Business Head" (three more Ukridge stories), which in the UK had already been included in Lord Emsworth and Others (1937). It also included three more Drones Club stories: "Trouble Down at Tudsleigh", which was in the UK version of Young Men in Spats (1936), "Bramley Is So Bracing", which would appear to UK readers in Nothing Serious (1950), and "Scratch Man", which would not appear in the UK until A Few Quick Ones (1959). Missing from the US edition were "Romance at Droitgate Spa" and "All's Well with Bingo", which had been included in The Crime Wave at Blandings (1937).

== Contents ==
=== "All's Well with Bingo" ===
- US: Saturday Evening Post, January 30, 1937
- UK: Strand, April 1937

Plot

At the Drones Club, an Egg (a nondescript member of the club) complains to a Crumpet and a Bean about Bingo Little singing with joy. The Crumpet tells the following story, explaining that Bingo is happy because he narrowly escaped getting into trouble with his wife Rosie.

Rosie asks Bingo to go to Monte Carlo to take notes she can use in her next novel. Bingo wants to gamble there, but Rosie, the household breadwinner, does not want him to gamble. Instead of giving him money, she has his travel bills sent to her so he is not tempted. Disappointed, Bingo goes to Monte Carlo, and discovers that the wealthy Drone Oofy Prosser is nearby. He gives Oofy lunch, and Oofy is grateful, though he refuses to lend Bingo money. Instead, he gives Bingo a tip to bet on the horse Spotted Dog. Bingo bets ten pounds on credit. The horse loses, and Bingo now owes ten pounds to a bookmaker who threatens that a nasty accident will befall Bingo if he does not pay.

Rosie's friend Dora Spurgeon returns Rosie's brooch, a birthday gift from Bingo that Dora had borrowed, to Bingo. He pawns it for five pounds and bets it, intending to use his supposedly unbeatable system (doubling his bet when he wins), yet he loses repeatedly. Playing roulette, he puts his last one hundred francs on Black. Up comes Zero, and his money is swept away by the croupier. Dejected, Bingo is suddenly greeted by Rosie, who was able to come because her luncheon was postponed. She expects to get her brooch back soon, which worries Bingo.

Bingo notices a pile of chips on Black worth no less than three thousand, two hundred francs, or about forty pounds. He had forgotten that when Zero comes up, even-odds bets are put "in prison", or kept on to await the result of the next spin. Distracted by Rosie, he had not taken out his winnings after Black turned up, so it all stayed on Black. Black came up seven more times. Bingo cannot take out his winnings, or else Rosie will see he has been gambling. He tries to make a face at the croupier to signal that he wants his money pushed aside, but the croupier misinterprets him and lets it all ride (meaning Bingo's money will continue to be bet double-or-nothing on Black).

Though Bingo is nervous, Black keeps coming up. Some of his winnings are finally pushed aside when his stake reaches the limit for even-odds bets. Rosie leaves at last, and Bingo happily claims forty-eight thousand francs. He buys back Rosie's brooch and goes to her. Rosie confesses that she was tempted to gamble and lost two hundred pounds in ten minutes. She is concerned this will upset Bingo. Bingo assures her that he understands, though he claims not to experience such impulses himself.

=== "Bingo and the Peke Crisis" ===
- US: Saturday Evening Post, May 29, 1937
- UK: Strand, June 1937

Plot

At the Drones Club, a Bean is upset that Bingo Little tried to give him a Peke which bit the Bean in the leg. A Crumpet tells the Bean that Bingo is more to be pitied than censured, and recounts the following story.

Bingo's wife Rosie, the household breadwinner, disapproves of Bingo's gambling habit and keeps him on a tight budget. Bingo wants to bet on a horse but has no capital. Rosie has asked Mr. Purkiss, the proprietor of a children's magazine called Wee Tots, to consider hiring Bingo as editor. Pleased at the prospect of having a salary, Bingo happily agrees to meet Purkiss at Charing Cross. Rosie leaves town, trusting Bingo to look after her six Pekes. She gives Bingo ten pounds to pay a bill for a dog harness.

Bingo uses the money to bet on the horse, then meets with Purkiss. A man to whom Bingo owes money walks by, so Bingo flees. The horse loses, Purkiss tells Bingo he will not be hired in a letter (which Bingo tears up), and worst of all, one of Rosie's Pekes is missing. Seeing a butler walking a Peke, Bingo decides to steal the dog to replace the lost one, and follows the pair to a house. He hides until none other than Mr. Purkiss walks outside with the Peke. Bitter about Purkiss's letter, Bingo's ethical qualms about stealing the dog vanish. He sneaks the Peke away using cheese as bait.

Later, Bingo's butler Bagshaw tells him one of the Pekes is out having its portrait painted. Bingo now has one too many dogs, but he cannot remember how to return to Purkiss's house, nor can he remember Purkiss's name, and therefore cannot look up his address. Bingo tries to give the Peke to the Bean, but the dog bites the Bean on his leg. (Bingo has agreed to pay for medical expenses.) Bagshaw helps Bingo remember the name of the grocer who sold Bingo cheese, and Bingo finds Purkiss's house from there. Bingo quietly returns the Peke, but it follows him back home.

Bagshaw informs Bingo that Purkiss paid a visit. Fearing Purkiss knows all, Bingo decides to ask for mercy. He visits Purkiss formally. Purkiss surprisingly confesses to stealing Bingo's dog; Purkiss, who had been looking after his wife's Peke, let the dog outside without a leash, and the dog vanished. Purkiss visited Bingo's house hoping to buy one of Rosie's dogs, but one of the dogs jumped on his leg. It looked just like the one he lost, so he took the dog. Bingo agrees to let Purkiss keep the dog in exchange for becoming editor. Bingo also asks for a small advance to pay Rosie's bill.

=== "The Editor Regrets" ===
- US: Saturday Evening Post, July 1, 1939
- UK: Strand, September 1939

Plot

Members of the Drones Club try to sell articles to Bingo Little, editor of the children's magazine Wee Tots, but Bingo rejects them. A Crumpet believes that Bingo enjoys rejecting their articles because he is drunk with power, and that this will get Bingo into trouble. The Crumpet remarks that this nearly happened not long ago, and recounts the following story.

Bella Mae Jobson, an American author of children's books, comes to London. Purkiss, Bingo's boss, wants her to contribute to Wee Tots and asks her to see his editor, Bingo. Bingo is not informed about this, and when told by telephone that Jobson has arrived, he feels too important to see someone without an appointment, and refuses to see her. Bingo later tells Purkiss that he sent her away. Purkiss angrily explains Jobson's importance. He then insults and fires Bingo.

Bingo does not look forward to telling this to his wife Rosie, who secured him the job, and goes to a party to distract himself. He meets the beautiful Bella Mae Jobson there. Hoping to ingratiate himself with her to impress Purkiss and get his job back, Bingo treats her to meals and gives her gifts, including a signed photograph of himself. She invites him to a lunch party at her hotel suite. Rosie returns from a trip early, and has been invited to Jobson's lunch party, complicating matters. Bingo has not told Jobson he is married and foresees embarrassment if this is discovered, so he writes a telegram to Jobson saying that he cannot attend. He decides to steal the signed photograph to keep Rosie from seeing it.

After bribing the maid to access Jobson's suite while she is out walking her dog, Bingo takes the photograph, but is met by Purkiss, who also bribes the maid to enter. Purkiss tries to talk to him but Bingo hurries out. Outside, he sees Rosie. She is on her way to comfort Mrs. Purkiss, who lost her dog. Rosie asks Bingo to tell Jobson that she and Mrs. Purkiss cannot make it to the party. Bingo readily consents, and Rosie leaves. Purkiss asks Bingo for help. To curry Jobson's favour, Purkiss took his wife's Pekingese and gave the dog to Jobson, so he does not want his wife to go to the party and see her dog there. He asks Bingo to prevent his wife from coming to the party. Bingo agrees in exchange for being reinstated as editor.

=== "Sonny Boy" ===
- US: Saturday Evening Post, September 2, 1939
- UK: Strand, December 1939

Plot

Bingo Little treats his baby, Algernon Aubrey Little, to milk at the Drones Club. A Crumpet tells a Bean, Egg and Pieface the following story about Bingo, his wife, the novelist Rosie M. Banks, and their baby.

Like Bingo at the same age, his baby is ugly and resembles a gargoyle. Bingo, an avid gambler always on the lookout for omens, takes this as a sign to bet on a horse named Gargoyle, but the horse loses and Bingo is down ten pounds, leaving him no money for luxuries. To make up the loss, he decides to get money from Oofy Prosser. Oofy is in love, but nonetheless in no mood to lend money. Bingo horns his way into dinner with Oofy and the girl. Oofy resents Bingo's presence and refuses to give him money. Rosie sends Bingo ten pounds to start a bank account for their baby Algy.

Bingo walks Algy in a baby carriage in Wimbledon Common. Bingo's bookmaker, Charlie Pikelet, is also walking an ugly baby with a baby carriage. Each man believes his baby is uglier, and Pikelet proposes a wager. Bingo bets ten pounds that Algy is the ugliest baby in Wimbledon, using Algy's ten pounds in the belief that Algy would not object. Pikelet asks a passing policeman to judge the babies. The policeman says that his own baby at home is even uglier, but declares Arabella the winner. Bingo loses the ten pounds.

Rosie calls Bingo and says she will be returning from her trip with her mother the next day. She asks Bingo to correct the galley proofs for her Christmas story and send them to her publisher. The story, "Tiny Fingers", concerns a hard-hearted godfather who disapproves of his goddaughter marrying a young artist, but is moved when their child sits on his knee and writes them a cheque. Bingo, remembering Oofy Prosser is Algy's godfather, is inspired by the story and goes to Oofy's flat with Algy. Oofy's valet, Corker, tells Bingo that Oofy is asleep after a late night. Bingo leaves Algy there and goes to greet Rosie and her mother at Paddington. Upon returning, Bingo finds Oofy alarmed by the baby. Oofy says that Bingo, by ruining his dinner with the girl, saved him from marriage and babies, and thanks Bingo by giving him fifty pounds.

=== "Anselm Gets His Chance" ===
- UK: Strand, July 1937
- US: Saturday Evening Post, July 3, 1937

Plot

Mr Mulliner remarks that vicars in rural England always preach the sermons on summer evenings, when the congregation is particularly receptive, preventing their curates from having the opportunity. He tells the following story about his cousin Rupert's younger son, Anselm, curate of the parish of Rising Mattock in Hampshire.

Anselm is engaged to Myrtle Jellaby, niece of Sir Leopold Jellaby, OBE. Their engagement is secret from Sir Leopold because Anselm only has his modest stipend to marry on. One day, Anselm unexpectedly inherits a stamp album from his late godfather. The album is insured for five thousand pounds. Myrtle warns Anselm to keep the album safe from Joe Beamish, a local man who used to be a burglar. Anselm shows the stamps to Sir Leopold, who collects stamps, hoping to sell it to him for five thousand pounds. Sir Leopold examines the collection and says they are not valuable. He offers ten pounds for the lot and tells him to think it over. Disappointed, Anselm leaves and returns to Myrtle. She suggests they let Joe Beamish know where the stamps are, then collect the insurance money after he steals them. Anselm thinks this plan is unethical, so Myrtle secretly carries it out on her own. She visits Joe and, pretending to be concerned about the security of the stamps, describes the album and where it is kept in the vicarage. At night in the vicarage, Anselm is awoken by sounds. His vicar, the Rev. Sidney Gooch, has a black eye after being punched by a burglar who stole the stamp album. Gooch cannot give sermons the next day because of his black eye, so Anselm will finally get a chance to preach a summer evening sermon.

Anselm has been saving a special sermon on Brotherly Love, and preaches it the following evening. It is extremely moving and well received. Later, Anselm tells Myrtle that he is concerned it would be unethical to send a claim to the insurance company when they know the stamp album is nearly worthless. Myrtle convinces him to send in the claim anyway. Joe appears and thanks Anselm for his touching sermon. He was so moved that he has come to return the stamp album he stole. Anselm tries to let Joe keep the album, but Joe insists that it belongs to Anselm. He withdraws, leaving Anselm and Myrtle to discuss their predicament. They hear someone sobbing. It is Sir Leopold, who was also deeply moved by Anselm's sermon. Sir Leopold asks for a pen and ink so he can write Anselm a cheque for ten thousand pounds for his stamp collection. He had recognized that the collection was worth five thousand pounds before but had lied, and now wants to pay Anselm ten thousand for it after hearing his sermon. He is also approving when they tell him of their engagement. Myrtle decides to drive to London immediately and deposit the cheque at the bank, in case Sir Leopold changes his mind.

=== "Romance at Droitgate Spa" ===
- US: Saturday Evening Post, February 20, 1937
- UK: Strand, August 1937

Plot

Frederick "Freddie" Fitch-Fitch goes to Droitgate Spa to ask his uncle and trustee, Major-General Sir Aylmer Bastable, to release his capital, so that he can marry Annabel Purvis. Sir Aylmer is in a bad mood because at Droitgate, he is not treated the way he has come to expect because of his aristocratic background and distinguished military record. He merely has a touch of gout, and only those with more serious maladies enjoy high social standing at the spa. Sir Aylmer is also annoyed because his nurse left. Freddie tells him he wants to marry a magician's assistant, but Sir Aylmer won't hear of it.

Freddie comes up with a plan: Annabel will become his uncle's new nurse and gain his favour, so when Freddie comes down and appears to fall in love with her, he will consent to Freddie marrying her. Annabel, who has experience nursing her Uncle Joe, agrees to the plan. In three weeks, she ingratiates herself with Sir Aylmer. Freddie comes and Sir Aylmer says Freddie ought to be in love with a girl like Annabel, since she is a good nurse and her late father was a colonel. Just ten minutes later, Freddie says she has accepted his proposal of marriage. Sir Aylmer is surprised but congratulates Freddie nonetheless. Freddie returns to London to get the papers for Sir Aylmer to sign to release his capital. A magician named Mortimer Rackstraw, known as The Great Boloni, comes to see Freddie at his club. Mortimer, while mechanically doing magic tricks out of anxiety, tells Freddie he was engaged to his assistant Annabel, but she ended their engagement to marry Freddie. Mortimer warns he will take revenge on Freddie for stealing the girl he loved.

Freddie gets a telegram from Annabel telling him to return to Droitgate Spa at once, though he has to put up with a talkative, unfashionable man on the train. At Droitgate, Annabel tells him that Mortimer has come. She locked him in the cellar, but he will be able to escape soon. He intends to introduce Sir Aylmer to Annabel's unsophisticated Uncle Joe, so that Sir Aylmer will not allow Freddie to marry Annabel. Annabel's uncle Joe is the man Freddie met on the train. Freddie rushes to the Pump Room to have Sir Aylmer sign his legal papers before Mortimer can reach him. However, Sir Aylmer is busy listening to a band playing. The music ends, but then Sir Aylmer is distracted by the distinguished, snobbish Lord Rumbelow. Lord Rumbelow has a complicated case of telangiectasis and acts superior towards the minor gout patient Sir Aylmer.

Mortimer arrives, despite Annabel's attempts to stop him, and tells Sir Aylmer that he must not allow his nephew to marry Annabel. Her late father had actually been a colonel in the Salvation Army, after being a Silver Ring bookmaker. Further, Mortimer introduces Uncle Joe, but Sir Aylmer is actually proud to meet him, since Joseph Boffin is famous for his ailments. Lord Rumbelow and his peers are also delighted to meet Joe. They congratulate Sir Aylmer on his nephew marrying the great Joseph Boffin's niece, and invite Sir Aylmer into their exclusive social club. Sir Aylmer signs Freddie's papers, and Freddie embraces Annabel. Mortimer, who has been absently doing magic tricks in the background, finally gives up and strides off.

=== "A Bit of Luck for Mabel" ===
- US: Saturday Evening Post, December 26, 1925
- UK: Strand, January 1926

Plot

Ukridge and his pal James Corcoran are taking a break in the country, and one night Ukridge decides to tell the story of Mabel and the top hat. Ukridge had met Mabel at a dinner party at his Aunt Julia's house, and had fallen for her hard; she was the daughter of a wealthy colonial type who was busy out in Singapore, and Ukridge began frequenting their house.

He has a rival for Mabel's love, who is a Baronet, which worries Ukridge somewhat, but he is given confidence by his dress, which, as he is at the time staying with his aunt, is rather dapper, top hat, spats and all. Ascot is approaching, and Ukridge agrees to attend with Mabel and her family.

Aunt Julia discovers that Ukridge has pawned a clock from the spare room, to pay for gifts for Mabel, and kicks him out once more; Ukridge takes lodgings, but one day his hat is blown off and crushed in the street. Needing one for Ascot, he approaches George Tupper for a loan, but Tupper, annoyed at Ukridge for touching him twice in a week, proposes to find Ukridge a job, and fixes up a meeting with a friend of his who is after a secretary. Ukridge agrees, but on the way out picks up Tupper's topper.

The day of the races arrives, and Ukridge gives his coat and hat to his landlady to clean up ready for the big event. She holds them to ransom, refusing to return them unless he pays the back-rent he owes. Desperate for apparel to attend the meet, he has a visitor, who he takes to be Tupper's friend come to interview him for the job; he tricks the man out of his coat and hat, which fit like a charm, and heads off to Ascot.

Arriving, he meets Tupper, who tells him the friend had to cancel their appointment and had left for Paris the previous evening. Ukridge is bemused, until Mabel asks where her father is - he had, apparently, returned early from Singapore, and had been sent to collect Ukridge and bring him along to Ascot. Having thus embarrassed himself in front of her father, Ukridge gives Mabel up, and hears she later married the Bart.

Ukridge suggests a weighty, moving title for the tale, something about fate and destiny, but Corky has something more fitting in mind.

=== "Buttercup Day" ===
- US: Saturday Evening Post, November 21, 1925
- UK: Strand, December 1925

Plot

Ukridge, impoverished as ever, complains to his friend Corky of his lack of funds, and also of the way charity collectors take a heavy toll on what money he does get hold of. His Aunt Julia is holding a fete in the grounds of her house while she is away, and he asks Corky to help him guard the place from the revelers.

Arriving at the Heath House, Corky is made to buy a paper flower from a pretty girl who informs him it is "Buttercup Day". Inside, Ukridge tells him it is all a plan of his - he has hired the girl, going in halves with her for the money she collects. Corky is shocked, but Ukridge explains that at no point is any real charity mentioned. With the money, suitably increased by some astute gambling, he plans to found a cat ranch in America.

A stuttering curate enters, and complains about the Buttercup girl; Corky is heading off to warn her when he runs into Aunt Julia, returned early. He tries to shake her off, and returns to Ukridge, whom he finds sleeping soundly; he meets Aunt Julia again, and a detective from Scotland Yard tells them that a dangerous crook is at the fete, a burglar known for his stuttering. He asks where Julia keeps her jewelry, and rushes off to check on it.

Julia and Corky find they are locked in. Their shouts eventually bring Ukridge, who releases them, and it emerges that Ukridge had been drugged by the curate, while the butler had been locked in the cellar at gunpoint by the fake detective. Aunt Julia's jewels and collection of precious snuff boxes are missing.

Ukridge is once again thrown out of his aunt's house, and is distraught to learn that his friend the Buttercup girl, having met a stuttering curate at the fete, had let him talk her into donating all her ill-gotten money to his church fund.

=== "Ukridge and the Old Stepper" ===
- UK: Strand, June 1928
- US: Liberty, June 9, 1928

Plot

Ukridge and his friend Corky, the latter angry that Ukridge has stolen his best new suit, run into the titular Old Stepper in the street one day, and Corky is astounded to see Ukridge blank the fellow, despite his friendly greeting and offer of a free lunch. Ukridge explains how the chill fell on their relationship...

Ukridge is sent by his Aunt Julia to her cottage in the country, mainly because her neighbour there is a successful man in the jute trade, and she hopes he may give Ukridge a job. Ukridge is sceptical, until he sees the man's daughter over his hedge and falls in love with her.

Later, a stranger calls at the house, and introduces himself as Ukridge's "Uncle Percy" - having married Ukridge's stepmother's stepsister (hence the nickname "The Old Stepper") - freshly arrived from Australia. Ukridge takes him in, and is delighted to find him a generous fellow, filling the house with comfortable furniture and providing a summer house for the garden.

The girl next door's birthday approaches, and Ukridge is in need of funds and ideas for her gift, until the Old Stepper suggests a sundial, which Ukridge agrees is a romantic thought. The man then goes and provides one, perfect for the job. With Ukridge well in the good books of his neighbours, he finally gets them to agree to come to tea one day, and his houseguest promises to fill the place with roses.

The girl and her father arrive, and all is going swimmingly until a stranger calls at the house, claims that the furniture was paid for with a bad cheque, and begins to repossess it. Ukridge has just managed to calm his guests when another stranger, the girl's uncle and Ukridge's neighbour on the other side, appears. He has returned home to find his sundial at his brother's house, his roses all removed to Ukridge's parlour and his summer house in Ukridge's garden. The guests all leave in disgust.

When the Old Stepper comes home, Ukridge berates him for his thieving ways. The old man tries to defend himself, claiming he has always "scrounged" things that were not in use, but ever since Ukridge has not trusted him, and has avoided him where possible, even at the cost of turning down a free meal.

== Background ==
Wodehouse explained the inspiration for the short story "All's Well with Bingo" in a letter written on 12 August 1947 to a fan asking about the inspiration for his writing. Wodehouse responded that when planning a story, he usually decided on which character to incorporate first and then determined the plot, but one exception to this rule was "All's Well with Bingo", a story based on an experience of his own. As Wodehouse wrote in his letter:

I was in the Casino at Le Touquet one night, wandering about and occasionally risking a small sum at one of the tables, and zero came up when I was backing Black, and at the same moment I happened to get into conversation with someone, and it was only some time later that I observed a pile of counters on Black and realized that they were mine. My gratification at scooping in the stuff was heightened by the immediate realization that I had got the core of a story.

Wodehouse also explained in the letter that he eventually chose Bingo Little and Mrs. Little for the story, and later incorporated the threatening bookmaker to make winning the money more important for Bingo.

In the 1920s, Wodehouse visited the real English spa towns Harrogate and later Droitwich. He used background information from these visits when writing several short stories, most notably the short story "Romance at Droitgate Spa".

== Publication history ==
In the Strand (UK), Gilbert Wilkinson illustrated "All's Well with Bingo", "Bingo and the Peke Crisis", "The Editor Regrets", "Sonny Boy", "Anselm Gets His Chance", and "Romance at Droitgate Spa". Reginald Cleaver illustrated "A Bit of Luck for Mabel", "Buttercup Day", and "Ukridge and the Old Stepper".

In the Saturday Evening Post (US), May Wilson Preston illustrated "Bingo and the Peke Crisis", "Anselm Gets His Chance", and "Buttercup Day", James Williamson illustrated "The Editor Regrets" and "Sonny Boy", Earl Blossom illustrated "All's Well with Bingo", James Schucker illustrated "Romance at Droitgate Spa", and Henry Raleigh illustrated "A Bit of Luck for Mabel". "Ukridge and the Old Stepper" was illustrated by C. A. Voight in Liberty.

"A Bit of Luck for Mabel" was reprinted, with Raleigh's illustrations, in the Post in March 1977. "All's Well with Bingo" was included in the US edition of The Week-End Wodehouse, published in 1939. "All's Well with Bingo" and the Ukridge stories "A Bit of Luck for Mabel", "Buttercup Day", and "Ukridge and the Old Stepper" were featured in the 1960 collection The Most of P. G. Wodehouse. "All's Well with Bingo" and the other Drones Club stories were included in the 1982 collection Tales from the Drones Club. The Ukridge stories in Eggs, Beans and Crumpets were included in The World of Ukridge, published in 1975 by Barrie & Jenkins.

The Best of Wodehouse, a 1949 collection of short stories, featured "Sonny Boy". The 1951 anthology The Best of Modern Humor, edited by P. G. Wodehouse and Scott Meredith, included "Sonny Boy", which was the only story by Wodehouse included in the anthology. The story was the only Wodehouse story included in the 1967 anthology A Carnival of Modern Humour, also edited by P. G. Wodehouse and Scott Meredith.

"Anselm Gets His Chance" was included in The World of Mr. Mulliner (1972). "Anselm Gets His Chance" and "Romance at Droitgate Spa" were collected in Vintage Wodehouse (1978). "Anselm Gets His Chance" and "Buttercup Day" were included in The World of Wodehouse Clergy (1984).

"Romance at Droitgate Spa" was translated into Swedish by Vilgot Hammarling and published in the Swedish magazine Vårt Hem in July 1937. The Swedish translation was also included in the Wodehouse short story collection Bland lorder och drönare, published in 2011. An introduction with Mr Mulliner was added to the version of "Romance at Droitgate Spa" in the US collection The Crime Wave at Blandings. This version of the story was not included in any other collection, including the 1972 Mulliner omnibus The World of Mulliner.

During World War II, while imprisoned in an internment camp in the town of Tost as a British civilian arrested in German-occupied France, Wodehouse contributed an abridged story based on "All's Well with Bingo" to the internee's newspaper, the Tost Times. As a light-hearted story, it was meant to make his fellow internees laugh. The story appeared in an edition of the Tost Times dated 1 June 1941.

== Adaptations ==
"Buttercup Day" was adapted into an episode of the television series The World of Wodehouse in 1968.

"The Editor Regrets", "Anselm Gets His Chance", and "Romance at Droitgate Spa" were adapted as episodes of the television series Wodehouse Playhouse (1974–1978).

== See also ==
- List of short stories by P. G. Wodehouse, categorised by series

== References and sources ==
Sources

- McIlvaine, Eileen; Sherby, Louise S.; Heineman, James H. (1990). P. G. Wodehouse: A Comprehensive Bibliography and Checklist. New York: James H. Heineman Inc. ISBN 978-0-87008-125-5.
- Midkiff, Neil. "The Wodehouse short stories". P. G. Wodehouse pages.
- Reggie (2007-03-16). "Eggs, Beans and Crumpets". Blandings, a Companion to the Works of P. G. Wodehouse. Archived from the original on 2007-09-27.
- Wodehouse, P. G. (1981) [1951]. Eggs, Beans and Crumpets (Reprinted ed.). Middlesex: Penguin Books. ISBN 0140033513.
- Wodehouse, P. G. (2013). Ratcliffe, Sophie (ed.). P. G. Wodehouse: A Life in Letters. London: W. W. Norton & Company. ISBN 978-0786422883.
