= Wedding Bells =

Wedding Bells may refer to:

- Wedding Bells (play), a 1919 American play
- Wedding Bells (1921 film), an American silent film based on the 1919 play
- Wedding Bells (1933 film), a short animated film
- Wedding Bells (1954 film), a 1954 West German drama film
- Royal Wedding, a 1951 musical released as Wedding Bells in the UK
- The Wedding Bells, a 2007 comedy-drama series cancelled after a few episodes aired
- "Wedding Bells" (Happy Hollidays), a 2009 television episode
- "Wedding Bells", an episode of Are You Being Served?
- "Wedding Bells", an episode of Walker, Texas Ranger
- "Wedding Bells", an episode of the British sitcom Hi-de-Hi!
- "Wedding Bells" (Godley & Creme song), 1981
- "Wedding Bells" (Jonas Brothers song), 2013
- "Wedding Bells" (Hank Williams song)

== See also ==
- No Wedding Bells, a 1923 film starring Oliver Hardy
- "No Wedding Bells for Him", a 1923 short story by P. G. Wodehouse
- "Wedding Bells Are Breaking Up That Old Gang of Mine", a 1929 barbershop song
- Wedding Bell, a song by the trio Sugar
- Wedding Belles, 2007 Scottish film
