= First Aid for Dora =

1923 short story by P. G. Wodehouse

- Short story by P. G. Wodehouse
- 1923 Cosmopolitan illustration by T. D. Skidmore
- Country: United States
- Language: English
- Genre: Comedy

Publication
- Publisher: Cosmopolitan (US); Strand (UK)
- Media type: Print (Magazine)
- Publication date: July 1923 (US); August 1923 (UK)

"First Aid for Dora" is a short story by P. G. Wodehouse, which first appeared in the United States in the July 1923 issue of Cosmopolitan and in the United Kingdom in the August 1923 Strand. It features the irrepressible Stanley Featherstonehaugh Ukridge, and was included in the collection Ukridge, published in 1924.

== Plot ==
Our narrator James Corcoran spots Ukridge helping an attractive young girl onto a bus; intrigued, he finds the girl is one Dora Mason, secretary to Ukridge's Aunt Julia, a novelist.

Later, having won some money on the Derby, Corcoran promises his friends a night out, but returning home to dress, he finds Bowles has let Ukridge borrow his evening suit. Dismayed, Corcoran must in turn borrow an ancient outfit from Bowles, which in addition to being rather snug, smells rather strongly of moth-balls, rendering his evening less than pleasant.

Seeing Ukridge enjoying himself in his fine clothes, Corcoran upbraids him strongly, but hears that Ukridge is entertaining the pretty Dora. The next day, Ukridge arrives with the news that, attempting to smuggle the girl back into his aunt's house, they were caught by a police officer, who woke the aunt, who in turn sacked Dora. Corcoran suggests asking their respectable friend George Tupper to put in a good word for the girl.

Later Ukridge returns with the news that Tupper's appeal has failed, and further upsets Corcoran by informing him that Aunt Julia now expects a visit from the writer, posing as a journalist from her favourite magazine, Women's Sphere, sent to interview her. Arriving at the house, he meets Aunt Julia in the company of another woman, introduced to him as a Miss Watterson, and finds her far less intimidating than expected. However, she soon reveals that Ukridge's thin plot has been see through, and that Miss Watterson is in fact the editor of Women's Sphere, sending Corcoran away in shame and embarrassment.

Arriving home, he finds Ukridge on his couch, and hears that Dora has found work elsewhere and the scheme need not go ahead. Ukridge had known this the previous day, but had forgotten to inform his friend and spare him his ordeal.

== Characters ==
- Stanley Featherstonehaugh Ukridge, the irrepressible entrepreneur
  - Julia Ukridge, his haughty writer aunt
    - Dora Mason, Julia's secretary and companion
- James Corcoran, Ukridge's writer friend
  - Bowles, Corky's landlord, an ex-butler
- George Tupper, an old schoolfriend of Ukridge and Corcoran
- Muriel Watterson, a friend of Julia's, editor of Women's Sphere

== Publication history ==
The story was illustrated by T. D. Skidmore in Cosmopolitan. It was illustrated by Reginald Cleaver in the Strand.

"First Aid for Dora" was included in the 1932 collection Nothing But Wodehouse, edited by Ogden Nash and published by Doubleday, Doran & Company, New York. The collection The World of Ukridge, published in October 1975 by Barrie & Jenkins, included the story.

== Adaptations ==
"First Aid for Dora" was adapted for radio and broadcast on the BBC Home Service in 1940, as the fourth and last episode of a Ukridge series. The episode featured Malcolm Graeme as Stanley Ukridge, Noel Dryden as Corcoran, Charles Mason as George Tupper, William Trent as Bowles, Alan Wheatley as Victor Beamish, Harold Scott as Bertram Fox, Valentine Dyall as Robert Dunhill, Philip Cunningham as Freddie Lunt, Mary O'Farrell as Miss Julia Ukridge, Dora Gregory as Miss Watterson, and Edgar Norfolk as a butler.

The story was adapted into the second of six episodes in the 1956 BBC Light Programme radio series of Ukridge stories, which starred Michael Shepley as Ukridge and Hubert Gregg as Corcoran. The cast also included Martin Lewis as Bowles, Margot Lister as Aunt Julia, Belle Chrystall as Miss Watterson, Brewster Mason as Tupper, Charles Hodgson as Bertram Fox, Rolf Lefebvre as Robert Dunhill, Manning Wilson as Victor Beamish, and Geoffrey Hodson as Freddie Lunt.

== See also ==
- List of Wodehouse's Ukridge stories
