= The Return of Battling Billson =

1923 short story by P. G. Wodehouse

- Short story by P. G. Wodehouse
- 1923 Cosmopolitan illustration by T. D. Skidmore
- Country: United States
- Language: English
- Genre: Comedy

Publication
- Publisher: Cosmopolitan (US); Strand (UK)
- Media type: Print (Magazine)
- Publication date: August 1923 (US); September 1923 (UK)

"The Return of Battling Billson" is a short story by P. G. Wodehouse, which first appeared in the United States in the August 1923 issue of Cosmopolitan and in the United Kingdom in the September 1923 Strand. It features the irrepressible Stanley Featherstonehaugh Ukridge, and was included in the collection Ukridge, published in 1924.

== Plot ==
Our plucky narrator Corky, researching for an article in the East End, has his pocket picked and finds himself unable to pay a bill at an inn. Kicked out by the landlord, he is rescued and avenged by a huge, red-headed man - none other than "Battling" Billson. He gives Billson Ukridge's address, and next day is landed with looking after Flossie's ghastly mother and ghoulish brother Cecil, despite having no recollection of who Flossie may be.

He beards Ukridge later, and is reminded of Billson's girl, who, it seems, is preventing the huge sailor from returning to the ring, for fear of him damaging his face. Ukridge wants Billson to fight, in a deal which would net them £200, and dealing with the mother, who Flossie can't stand, is Ukridge's way of bringing her on side.

Billson enters the ring and starts strongly, but soon fades, and looks certain to lose. At the last moment, he rallies spectacularly, and destroys his opponent. Corcoran goes home happy for his friend's success, but Ukridge arrives later bewailing cruel fate. The £200, it seems, was a bribe to throw the fight, which Billson had been on the verge of doing when his opponent stepped on his ingrowing toenail, enraging the big man and making him win the fight - which netted a mere £20.

Billson was introduced in "The Debut of Battling Billson", and would return in several other Ukridge stories.

== Main characters ==
- Stanley Featherstonehaugh Ukridge, the irrepressible entrepreneur
- James Corcoran, Ukridge's writer friend
- "Battling" Billson, a boxer sometimes managed by Ukridge
  - Flossie, Billson's girl, a barmaid
    - Flossie's mother, an awful woman from the North
    - Cecil, Flossie's brother, a ghoulish child

== Publication history ==
"The Return of Battling Billson" was illustrated by T. D. Skidmore in Cosmopolitan. It was illustrated by Reginald Cleaver in The Strand Magazine.

The story was included in the collection The World of Ukridge, published in October 1975 by Barrie & Jenkins.

== Adaptations ==
Characters from the story appeared in an episode of The World of Wodehouse, "The Debut Of Battling Billson", which aired in July 1968. The cast included Anton Rodgers as Ukridge, Julian Holloway as Corky, Dickie Owen as Battling Billson, Pamela Cundell as Flossie Burns, Julie May as Mrs Burns, and Roland Pickering as Cecil.

The story was adapted into the fifth episode of the 1992–1993 Ukridge radio series. Adapted by Julian Dutton, the episode was also titled "The Return Of Battling Billson". It starred Griff Rhys Jones as Ukridge and Robert Bathurst as Corky, with Adam Godley as Tupper and Cecil, Simon Godley as Beamish, and Dougal Lee as Bowles and Billson. Other roles were voiced by Rebecca Front and Julian Dutton.

== See also ==
- List of Wodehouse's Ukridge stories
