= Ukridge's Dog College =

Short story by P. G. Wodehouse

- Short story by P. G. Wodehouse
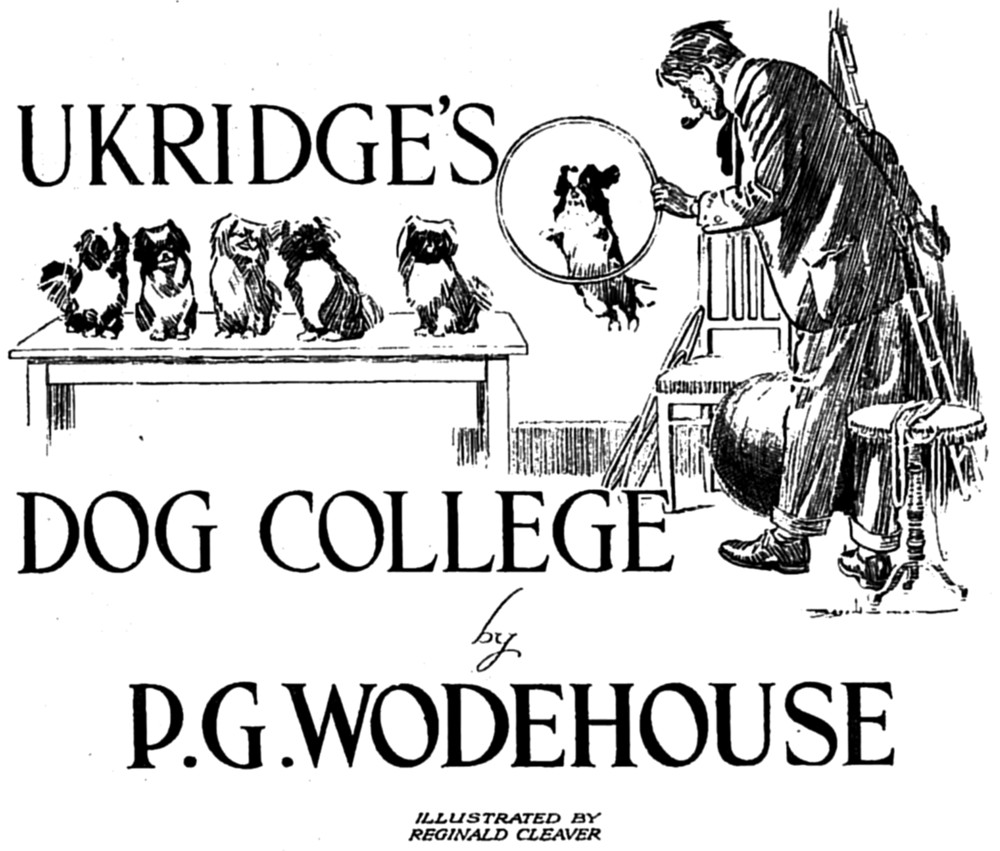
- 1923 Strand illustration by Reginald Cleaver
- Country: United Kingdom
- Language: English
- Genre: Comedy

Publication
- Publisher: Cosmopolitan (US); Strand (UK)
- Media type: Print (Magazine)
- Publication date: April 1923 (US); May 1923 (UK)

"Ukridge's Dog College" is a short story by P. G. Wodehouse, which first appeared in the United States in the April 1923 issue of Cosmopolitan, and in the United Kingdom in the May 1923 Strand. It features the irrepressible Stanley Featherstonehaugh Ukridge and was included in the collection Ukridge, published in 1924.

== Plot ==
Ukridge is introduced to the reader as a childhood friend of the narrator, later revealed to be James "Corky" Corcoran, who having been expelled from school for sneaking out of the school grounds to attend a fair has travelled the world undertaking all manner of enterprises. He is now, much to Corky's surprise, living with his wealthy aunt near Wimbledon Common and dressing smartly. All this soon ends, however, when Ukridge appears in Corky's London apartment, dressed after the old manner and accompanied by half-a-dozen Pekingese dogs. He announces to Corky that he plans to run a school for dogs, training them up as performers for the music hall, and promptly departs for Sheep's Cray in Kent.

Some weeks later, Corky receives an urgent telegram from Ukridge, and travels to Kent. There he finds Ukridge in his usual state of financial embarrassment and returns to London to ask a mutual friend George Tupper for the necessary funds. Tupper coughs up happily and forms a plan to approach Ukridge's Aunt Julia in order to gain capital to fund Ukridge's scheme. Corky returns to Kent, where he finds Ukrdige enraged that his landlord, angered at not being paid, has kidnapped Ukridge's dogs. They visit the landlord, and pay him the money, but he finds the dogs have escaped, and in his contrition at having ruined Ukridge's business, agrees to refund Ukridge's rent and pay his remaining debts to local tradesmen. Ukridge and Corky return to Ukridge's house, where they find the dogs, Ukridge having secretly retrieved them overnight. They are about to decamp when Corky breaks the news about Tupper's plan, at which Ukridge quivers with shock: the dogs were in fact purloined from Aunt Julia. Upon hearing Aunt Julia's voice inside Ukridge's cottage, Corky slips away and leaves Ukridge to face the music alone.

== Characters ==
- Stanley Featherstonehaugh Ukridge, the irrepressible entrepreneur
- James Corcoran, Ukridge's writer friend
  - Bowles, Corky's landlord, an ex-butler
- George Tupper, an old schoolfriend of Ukridge and Corcoran
- Mr Nickerson, Ukridge's rural landlord

== Publication history ==
In Cosmopolitan, the story was illustrated by T. D. Skidmore. In the Strand, it was illustrated by Reginald Cleaver.

The story was included in the 1932 collection Nothing But Wodehouse, edited by Ogden Nash and published by Doubleday, Doran & Company, New York. It was included in The Most of P. G. Wodehouse, a 1960 collection published by Simon and Schuster, New York. It was featured in the collection The World of Ukridge, published in October 1975 by Barrie & Jenkins, along with the other Ukridge short stories. The story was included in A Wodehouse Bestiary, a 1985 collection edited by D. R. Bensen and published by Ticknor & Fields, New York.

== Adaptations ==
The story was adapted for radio in 1940 and broadcast on the BBC Home Service, as one of four Ukridge episodes produced by Peter Creswell and adapted by Helmar Fernback. The radio drama featured Malcolm Graeme as Ukridge, William Hutchison as Corky, Gladys Young as Aunt Julia, Charles Mason as George Tupper, William Trent as Bowles, and Howard Marion-Crawford as Nickerson.

In 1968, the story was adapted for television as "The Dog College", the second episode of the second series of The World of Wodehouse.

It was adapted for radio as the fourth episode of The Adventures of Ukridge (1992–93), a series of six 30-minute radio dramas based on Ukridge stories. The episode featured Griff Rhys Jones as Ukridge, Robert Bathurst as Corky, Adam Godley as Tupper, Simon Godley as Beamish, Dougal Lee as Bowles, Julian Dutton as The Great Verdini and Nickerson, and Rebecca Front as Aunt Julia and Mrs Steerforth.

== See also ==
- List of Wodehouse's Ukridge stories
