= Ukridge (short story collection) =

1924 short story collection by P. G. Wodehouse

First edition (UK)

Ukridge is a collection of short stories by P. G. Wodehouse, first published in the United Kingdom on 3 June 1924 by Herbert Jenkins, London, and in the United States on 30 July 1925 by George H. Doran, New York, under the title He Rather Enjoyed It.

The stories had previously appeared in Cosmopolitan Magazine in the US and in the Strand Magazine in the UK.

The book contains ten short stories relating the adventures of Stanley Featherstonehaugh Ukridge, narrated by Ukridge's long-suffering friend, the writer "Corky" Corcoran.

== Contents ==
- "Ukridge's Dog College"
  - United States: Cosmopolitan, April 1923
  - United Kingdom: Strand, May 1923
- "Ukridge's Accident Syndicate"
  - US: Cosmopolitan, May 1923
  - UK: Strand, June 1923 (as "Ukridge, Teddy Weeks and the Tomato")
- "The Debut of Battling Billson" (spelled Début in original versions)
  - US: Cosmopolitan, June 1923
  - UK: Strand, July 1923
- "First Aid for Dora"
  - US: Cosmopolitan, July 1923
  - UK: Strand, August 1923
- "The Return of Battling Billson"
  - US: Cosmopolitan, August 1923
  - UK: Strand, September 1923
- "Ukridge Sees Her Through"
  - US: Cosmopolitan, September 1923
  - UK: Strand, October 1923
- "No Wedding Bells for Him"
  - US: Cosmopolitan, October 1923
  - UK: Strand, November 1923
- "The Long Arm of Looney Coote"
  - US: Cosmopolitan, November 1923
  - UK: Strand, December 1923
- "The Exit of Battling Billson"
  - US: Cosmopolitan, December 1923
  - UK: Strand, January 1924
- "Ukridge Rounds a Nasty Corner"
  - US: Cosmopolitan, January 1924
  - UK: Strand, February 1924

Ukridge had previously appeared in Love Among the Chickens (1906), Wodehouse's first novel to be published in the US, and would return in some other shorts. The timeline of his adventures is rather hard to follow—the tales collected here begin with him meeting up with Corky after a long separation, and follow fairly neatly on from each other, via being disowned by his Aunt Julia to meeting Millie, to whom he is married by the time of Love Among the Chickens. In the later shorts, however, he seems to be still single and living sporadically with his aunt.

== Reception ==
Wodehouse biographer Richard Usborne cheered, "These are some of the best stories that Wodehouse ever wrote."

== See also ==
- List of Wodehouse's Ukridge stories

== References and sources ==
Sources

- Midkiff, Neil. "The Wodehouse short stories". "Neil Midkiff's P. G. Wodehouse pages".
