= No Wedding Bells for Him =

1923 short story by P. G. Wodehouse

- Short story by P. G. Wodehouse
- 1923 Cosmopolitan illustration by T. D. Skidmore
- Country: United States
- Language: English
- Genre: Comedy

Publication
- Publisher: Cosmopolitan (US); Strand (UK)
- Media type: Print (Magazine)
- Publication date: October 1923 (US); November 1923 (UK)

"No Wedding Bells for Him" is a short story by British author P. G. Wodehouse, which first appeared in the United States in the October 1923 issue of Cosmopolitan, and in the United Kingdom in the November 1923 Strand. It features the irrepressible Stanley Featherstonehaugh Ukridge, and was included in the collection Ukridge, published in 1924.

== Plot ==
Ukridge and Corky run into a friend of Ukridge's, a chauffeur driving a shiny new Daimler, and he offers to take them for a ride. Along the way they are seen by a creditor of Ukridge's, who they shake off, and almost hit a young girl, who Ukridge insists they drive to her home near Clapham Common. He befriends her family, who are impressed by the car and Ukridge's famous Aunt Julia.

When Corky meets Ukridge a week later in the British Museum, he is accompanied by two children. He reveals he has been visiting the house, mainly for the free food, and promising to take the family out on trips in his friend's car, which they believe to be his, and to introduce them to his aunt, who, he reveals, has disowned him, in a letter which states "from now on, I have no nephew".

Returning from short holiday, Corky hears from George Tupper that Ukridge is engaged. Visiting his friend, he finds him with a black eye, and hears the tale of how Ukridge found himself inadvertently engaged to the girl from Clapham Common, and got punched by a rival suitor named Finch. As they talk on Ukridge's doorstep, the creditor from the car ride arrives, and Ukridge hides. A friendly passer-by soothes the enraged creditor, arguing that he knows where Ukridge lives; Ukridge moves out of his house, remarking on the good fortune that led him to use the pseudonym "Mr. Smallweed" when dealing with the man.

Ukridge and Corky form a plot to get Ukridge out of the engagement by feigning ill-health, but as Corky is delivering his speech to the family, the passer-by arrives. He is George Finch, Ukridge's rival for the girl; he reveals that Ukridge is an impoverished imposter, in fact called Smallweed, and produces the creditor to prove it. He also bears a letter from Ukridge's aunt, claiming that she has no nephew. Once Corky has paid off the debt to the creditor, the two are chased from the house.

== Main characters ==
- Stanley Featherstonehaugh Ukridge, the irrepressible entrepreneur
  - Julia Ukridge, his haughty writer aunt
- James Corcoran, Ukridge's writer friend
- George Tupper, an old schoolfriend of Ukridge and Corcoran
- Frederick, a chauffeur, a friend of Ukridge
- Mabel Price, a girl Ukridge meets on the road
  - Mr Price, her doting father
  - Ernie Finch, her admirer, a resourceful man
- Mr Grindlay, a man Ukridge owes money to, who knows him only as "Mr Smallweed"

== Publication history ==
The story was illustrated by T. D. Skidmore in Cosmopolitan. It was illustrated by Reginald Cleaver in the Strand.

"No Wedding Bells for Him" was included in the 1932 collection Nothing But Wodehouse, edited by Ogden Nash and published by Doubleday, Doran & Company. It was included in Week-End Wodehouse (UK edition), first published by Herbert Jenkins Limited in 1939. It was also collected in The World of Ukridge, published in October 1975 by Barrie & Jenkins.

== Adaptations ==
"No Wedding Bells for Him" was adapted for radio in 1956, with Michael Shepley as Ukridge, Hubert Gregg as Corcoran, Olaf Pooley as Frederick, Jeffrey Segal as Mr Grindley, Mairhi Russell as Mabel Price, and Brewster Mason as Tupper.

It was adapted for the television series The World of Wodehouse. The episode, titled "The Wedding Bells", aired in 1968, and included the character Looney Coote (from "The Long Arm of Looney Coote").

== See also ==
- List of Wodehouse's Ukridge stories
