= Ukridge Sees Her Through =

1923 short story by P. G. Wodehouse

- Short story by P. G. Wodehouse
- 1923 Cosmopolitan illustration by T. D. Skidmore
- Country: United States
- Language: English
- Genre: Comedy

Publication
- Publisher: Cosmopolitan (US); Strand (UK)
- Media type: Print (Magazine)
- Publication date: September 1923 (US); October 1923 (UK)

"Ukridge Sees Her Through" is a short story by P. G. Wodehouse, which first appeared in the United States in the September 1923 issue of Cosmopolitan and in the United Kingdom in the October 1923 Strand. It features the irrepressible Stanley Featherstonehaugh Ukridge, and was included in the collection Ukridge, published in 1924.

== Plot ==
Ukridge's friend James Corcoran is persuaded to hire a typist to speed his writing. He meets Dora Mason, former secretary to Ukridge's Aunt Julia and now partner in a typing firm, and finds she gained her partnership based on a promise from Ukridge that he will provide the £100 she needs to buy the share. Shocked, Corcoran asks his friend how he hopes to find the money.

Ukridge reveals that Hank Philbrick, an old friend from Canada has made it big, and has been persuaded by Ukridge to buy an English country house; Ukridge has contracted with an agent, who will split the hefty commission with Ukridge. Corcoran meets Ukridge late one night, and finds with him the Canadian, who is in a state of severe inebriation. Ukridge tells Corky that he has been drinking heavily since he came into his fortune.

Some days later, Ukridge arrives at his friend's house, distraught. The Canadian, in ill health after his binge, has been advised by a doctor to repair to warmer climes, and plans to leave for Egypt, scuppering Ukridge's scheme.

A magazine editor asks Corky to attend a small dance held by the Pen and Ink Club; he goes, in some trepidation that Julia Ukridge, president of the club, will remember their previous meeting. She does, and confronts him, but on seeing his press invitation is calmed. Another author, Charlton Prout, secretary of the club, takes Corky into a side room to talk; when they emerge, the hall is packed. To the dismay of the Pen and Ink people, a party of 700 revellers has mysteriously bought tickets for the bash, for Warner's Stores company outing.

Ukridge later reveals that he sold the tickets for the party, paying his debt of honour to Dora and netting a further £50 for himself.

== Main characters ==
- Stanley Featherstonehaugh Ukridge, the irrepressible entrepreneur
  - Julia Ukridge, his haughty writer aunt
    - Dora Mason, Julia's secretary and companion
- James Corcoran, Ukridge's writer friend
- Hank Philbrick, a friend of Ukridge, a wealthy Canadian
- Charlton Prout, a writer, secretary of the Pen and Ink Club

== Publication history ==
In Cosmopolitan, the story was illustrated by T. D. Skidmore. It was illustrated by Reginald Cleaver in The Strand.

The story was included in the 1932 collection Nothing But Wodehouse, edited by Ogden Nash and published by Doubleday, Doran & Company, New York. It was collected in The World of Ukridge, published in October 1975 by Barrie & Jenkins.

== Adaptations ==
The story was adapted for radio in 1956, with Michael Shepley as Ukridge, Hubert Gregg as Corcoran, Beth Boyd as Dora Mason, Brian Haines as Hank Philbrick, Martin Lewis as Bowles, Margot Lister as Aunt Julia, Rolf Lefebvre as Charlton Prout, George Merritt as Biggs, and Hamilton Dyce as a guest. The adaptation aired on 8 June 1956 on the BBC Light Programme.

== See also ==
- List of Wodehouse's Ukridge stories
