= Ukridge's Accident Syndicate =

1923 short story by P. G. Wodehouse

- Short story by P. G. Wodehouse
- 1923 Cosmopolitan illustration by T. D. Skidmore
- Country: United Kingdom
- Language: English
- Genre: Comedy

Publication
- Publisher: Cosmopolitan (US); Strand (UK)
- Media type: Print (Magazine)
- Publication date: May 1923 (US); June 1923 (UK)

"Ukridge's Accident Syndicate" is a short story by P. G. Wodehouse, which first appeared in the United States in the May 1923 issue of Cosmopolitan, and in the United Kingdom in The Strand Magazine in June 1923, under the title "Ukridge, Teddy Weeks and the Tomato". It features the irrepressible Stanley Featherstonehaugh Ukridge, and was included in the collection Ukridge, published in 1924.

== Plot ==
The story is told in flashback as Ukridge and his friend James Corcoran stand outside the wedding of one Teddy Weeks, a successful movie star. The tale begins some years earlier, when Weeks was a struggling actor who believed all he needed to get his breakthrough role was a decent wardrobe. Ukridge, Corcoran, Weeks and others are dining at their regular haunt when one of their number reveals he has acquired accident insurance as a bonus for subscribing to a magazine, and has subsequently received five pounds after a minor cycling accident. Ukridge is inspired by this, and persuades his comrades to form a syndicate, subscribing to all magazines offering this free insurance, arranging an "accident" and splitting the insurance monies. Lots are drawn, and Weeks is selected as the one to be insured and to suffer the accident.

Time passes and Weeks shows no sign of taking any damage. Despite much cajoling, pointing out of appropriate taxi cabs and even the placing of dangerous dogs in his rooms, he remains unhurt. Finally, he agrees that he will do the honourable thing, on condition that he is first primed with a fine dinner and champagne. The syndicate scrape together the necessary funds, and watch glumly as Weeks dines and guzzles the pricey drink, abusing his friends roundly as he grows inebriated. After the feast, he laughs at his friends, tells them he had no intention of having his accident despite their generosity, and promptly slips in front of a passing truck.

Visiting Weeks in hospital, he claims to have no memory of events, stymieing any attempt to retrieve the funds. Instead he spends the cash on fine clothes, and kick-starts his career in the movies. Returning to the present, Ukridge bribes a passing vagrant (with a shilling borrowed from Corky) to throw a tomato at Weeks as he leaves the church to face the waiting throng of photographers; the good man's aim is true, and justice is restored.

== Main characters ==
- Stanley Featherstonehaugh Ukridge, the irrepressible entrepreneur
- James Corcoran, Ukridge's writer friend
- Teddy Weeks, a syndicate member, later a movie star
- Victor Beamish, a struggling artist, and syndicate member
- Bertram Fox, a struggling writer of screenplays, and syndicate member
- Robert Dunhill, an employee of the New Asiatic Bank, and syndicate member
- Freddie Lunt, another toiler, a keen cyclist and syndicate member

== Style ==
Christopher Holcomb analyzes "Ukridge's Accident Syndicate" in an article comparing the story to Mark Twain's comedic short story "Journalism in Tennessee". Drawing upon Victor Raskin's script-based theory of humour, Holcomb writes that both authors create humour by using "script oppositions", or concepts that normally have opposing associations. Connected instances of these opposing scripts are seen in different "nodes", or certain passages in different parts of the text.

For example, in "Ukridge's Accident Syndicate", Ukridge comes up with a "plan" to acquire money from an "accident", which creates humour because the idea of a "plan" is normally opposed to the concept of an "accident". Furthermore, the accident in Ukridge's plan involves what Holcomb terms the "gain by injury" script, which is opposed to the "loss by injury" which would be the typical result of an accident. Wodehouse first establishes the ordinary meaning of the opposing concepts, and later links these concepts in unexpected ways. For example, early in the story, Freddie Lunt explains why he has recently been absent from the dinners of Ukridge's group of friends:

"I had an accident ... fell off my bicycle and sprained my ankle."
"Tough luck," was our verdict.
"Oh, I don't know," said Freddie. "It wasn't bad fun getting a rest. And of course there was the fiver."
"What fiver?"
"I got a fiver from the Weekly Cyclist for getting my ankle sprained."
"You–what?" cried Ukridge, profoundly stirred – as ever – by a tale of easy money. "Do you mean to sit there and tell me that some dashed paper paid you five quid simply because you sprained your ankle? Pull yourself together, old horse. Things like that don't happen."
"It's quite true."

This passage initially evokes the idea that an "accident" entails a "loss by injury", since Freddie sprained his ankle. The opposing "gain by injury" is at first weakly introduced with the phrase "It wasn't bad fun getting a rest", and is then more explicitly established by the phrase "I got a fiver ... for getting my ankle sprained". Ukridge is inspired by Lunt's story and later proposes his plan:

"Here's the scheme. We take out subscriptions for all these papers, then we draw lots, and the fellow who gets the fatal card or whatever it is goes out and breaks his leg and draws the loot, and we split it up between us and live on it in luxury."

In this quote, there is a comedic incongruity between the phrase "breaks his leg", which again recalls the connected ideas of "accident" and "loss by injury", and the phrase "draws the loot", which has the opposing meaning of a "gain by injury". Additionally, the phrase "breaks his leg" becomes more significant when it is decided that Teddy Weeks, an aspiring actor, will be the victim. "Break a leg" is a phrase used to wish an actor good luck with a performance, and essentially involves a wish for harm and an opposing wish for success.

According to Holcomb, Wodehouse often uses "pseudo-epigrams", or isolated comedic comments that depend on the context of the story for their humour. For example, after Teddy Weeks remains uninjured for a while, the narrator laments, "In a crippled world, it seemed, Teddy Weeks walked alone, whole and glowing with health." Also, after Beamish and not Weeks is bitten by a dog, the narrator comments, "A dog-bitten Victor Beamish had no market value whatever." These quotes create humour by evoking the opposing scripts already present in the story.

== Publication history ==
In Cosmopolitan, the story was illustrated by T.D. Skidmore. It was illustrated by Reginald Cleaver in the Strand. The original Cosmopolitan publication of the story is slightly shorter than the version in the Strand, omitting a few lines of description and dialogue and most notably ending the story before the incident with the tomato. The longer Strand version with the complete ending is the one collected in all book appearances of "Ukridge's Accident Syndicate".

"Ukridge's Accident Syndicate" was included in the 1932 collection Nothing But Wodehouse, edited by Ogden Nash and published by Doubleday, Doran & Company, New York. It was included in the 1939 collection Week-end Wodehouse (UK edition), published by Herbert Jenkins Limited, London. The 1960 collection The Most of P. G. Wodehouse, published by Simon and Schuster, New York, included the story. Along with the other Ukridge stories, it was collected in the 1975 omnibus The World of Ukridge, published by Barrie & Jenkins.

The story was also included in the 1978 collection Vintage Wodehouse, edited by Richard Usborne and published by Barrie & Jenkins, in Wodehouse on Crime, a 1981 collection edited by D. R. Bensen with a foreword by Isaac Asimov, published by Ticknor & Fields, New York, and in Short Stories, a collection of stories by Wodehouse published by the Folio Society in 1983 with drawings by George Adamson.

It was featured in The Second Century of Humour, an anthology with illustrations by Fougasse published by Hutchinson, London, in 1936. "Ukridge's Accident Syndicate" was also included in the anthology The Best of Humor, edited by Mordecai Richler, published in 1983 by Knopf in 1983 and Penguin in 1984.

== Adaptations ==
The story was adapted for radio in 1940 and broadcast on the BBC Home Service, under the title "Accident Syndicate". It was one of four Ukridge episodes produced by Peter Creswell and adapted by Helmar Fernback. The radio drama featured Malcolm Graeme as Ukridge, William Hutchison as Corky, Alan Wheatley as Teddy Weeks, and Charles Mason as Victor Beamish.

In 1968, the story was adapted for television as "The Accident Syndicate", the fourth episode of the second series of The World of Wodehouse.

The first episode of The Adventures of Ukridge (1992–93), a radio series that first aired on BBC Radio 4, was based on the story. Adapted by Julian Dutton, the episode featured Griff Rhys Jones as Ukridge, Robert Bathurst as Corky, Adam Godley as Tupper, Simon Godley as Beamish, Julian Dutton as Teddy, and Rebecca Front as Madeline.

== See also ==
- List of Wodehouse's Ukridge stories
