= Billson =

Billson may refer to:

== People ==
- Alfred Billson (British politician) (1839–1907), English Liberal Party politician
- Alfred Arthur Billson (1858–1930), Australian politician
- Anne Billson (born 1954), British writer, photographer, and film critic
- Bruce Billson (born 1966), Australian politician
- Charles J. Billson (1858–1932), English translator, lawyer and collector of folklore
- Herbert George Billson (1971–1938), British colonial administrator, scientist, and rugby player
- John Billson (1862–1924), British-born Australian politician
- William W. Billson (1847–1923), American lawyer and politician

== Fictional ==
- Battling Billson, a short stories character by P.G. Wodehouse

== See also ==
- Bilson
