= The Long Arm of Looney Coote =

1923 short story by P. G. Wodehouse

- Short story by P. G. Wodehouse
- 1923 Cosmopolitan illustration by T. D. Skidmore
- Country: United States
- Language: English
- Genre: Comedy

Publication
- Publisher: Cosmopolitan (US); Strand (UK)
- Media type: Print (Magazine)
- Publication date: November 1923 (US); December 1923 (UK)

"The Long Arm of Looney Coote" is a short story by P. G. Wodehouse, which first appeared in the United States in the November 1923 issue of Cosmopolitan, and in the United Kingdom in the December 1923 Strand. It features the irrepressible Stanley Featherstonehaugh Ukridge, and was included in the collection Ukridge, published in 1924.

== Plot ==
Corky runs into Looney Coote at Sandown Park Racecourse, where the latter has had some luck on the horses but lost his wallet; we hear of the impending dinner of Wrykyn Old Boys. There, after heavily endorsing a bookmaking business he has become a silent partner in, Ukridge hears that his old pal Boko Lawlor is standing for Parliament in the forthcoming by-election at Redbridge, and goes down to help. He sends Corky many telegrams detailing the successes of the campaign, and persuades him to pen a song to help the cause.

Corky meets Coote again, and hears that his expensive new car has been stolen. Sending Coote on his way to Scotland Yard to report the theft, Corky heads down to Redbridge to see how his song is going down. Dragged out to canvas, he finds that the situation is not as simple as Ukridge implied - the seat is very close and could go either way. Boko reveals that Ukridge is pivotal to the campaign, and worries that any scandal concerning Ukridge could ruin his chances.

At a large and important meeting, Corky steps out into a corridor for some peace, where he meets a police officer who is clearly antagonistic to Lawlor. Hearing the man plans to arrest Ukridge for stealing a car, Corky tries to stop him, but fails - he announces Ukridge is under arrest to the mob, who turn on Lawlor.

Back in London, Ukridge berates Looney Coote for reporting his car stolen, despite Ukridge leaving a note to say he was borrowing it. Of course, the note is still in the great man's pocket. Looney is happy, however, having been inspired by the incident to bet heavily on a horse named "Stolen Goods". On Ukridge's advice, he used Ukridge's bookmaker friend, who was bankrupted by Looney's large win and is looking for Urkridge to share the loss with.

== Main characters ==
- Stanley Featherstonehaugh Ukridge, the irrepressible entrepreneur
- James Corcoran, Ukridge's writer friend
- George Tupper, an old schoolfriend of Ukridge and Corcoran
- "Looney" Coote, another old schoolfriend, a superstitious chap
- "Boko" Lawlor, a schoolfriend standing for Parliament

== Publication history ==
"The Long Arm of Looney Coote" was illustrated by T. D. Skidmore in Cosmopolitan. It was illustrated by Reginald Cleaver in the Strand.

It was collected in The World of Ukridge, published in October 1975 by Barrie & Jenkins.

== Adaptations ==
The story was adapted for radio in 1956, with Michael Shepley as Ukridge, Hubert Gregg as Corcoran, Rolf Lefebvre as Looney Coote, and Olaf Pooley as Boko Lawlor. Other roles were voiced by Manning Wilson, George Merritt, and Charles Hodgson.

The character Looney Coote appeared in an episode of the television series The World of Wodehouse, "The Wedding Bells", which aired in 1968.

A 1993 radio adaptation of the story featured Griff Rhys Jones as Ukridge, Robert Bathurst as Corky, Adam Godley as Tupper, Simon Godley as Beamish, Dougal Lee as Bowles and Boko Lawlor, and Julian Dutton as Looney Coote. The story was adapted by Julian Dutton.

== See also ==
- List of Wodehouse's Ukridge stories
