= Battling =

Battling may refer to:

- Battle, a combat in warfare
- Battling Billson, a 1923 short stories character by P. G. Wodehouse
- Battling Levinsky, an American world champion light heavyweight boxer
- Battling Nelson, a Danish world champion lightweight champion boxer
- Battling Shaw, a Mexican world champion light welterweight boxer
- Battling Siki, a French light heavyweight boxer
