= Stanley Featherstonehaugh Ukridge =

Fictional character in P. G. Wodehouse stories

- First appearance: Love Among the Chickens (1906)
- Last appearance: Ukridge Starts a Bank Account (1966)
- Created by: P. G. Wodehouse
- Portrayed by: Malcolm Graeme (1940); Michael Shepley (1956); Naunton Wayne (1959); Anton Rodgers (1968); Griff Rhys Jones(1992-1993)

In-universe information
- Gender: Male
- Occupation: Various
- Relatives: Julia Ukridge (aunt)
- Nationality: British
- Education: Wrykyn school (expelled)

Stanley Featherstonehaugh Ukridge (/ˈfænʃɔː ˈjuːkrɪdʒ/ FAN-shaw YOO-krij) is a fictional character in comedic stories by author P. G. Wodehouse. Ukridge appears in one novel and nineteen short stories. Ukridge is a charismatic opportunist who will do anything to increase his capital—except, of course, work. The stories in which he appears generally involve his get-rich-quick schemes. Though Ukridge never achieved the popularity of the same author's Bertie Wooster and Jeeves, Wodehouse retained a certain fondness for him, his last appearance in a Wodehouse story being as late as 1966. With completed new stories appearing over a span of 60 years, he is the longest-running of Wodehouse's characters, topping Jeeves and Wooster (1915–1974, or 59 years) and the denizens of Blandings Castle (1915–1969, or 54 years).

== Inspiration ==
Robert Graves wrote that Wodehouse had based the character of Ukridge on Graves' brother Perceval, who was one of Wodehouse's personal friends. Wodehouse himself, in a letter to Perceval, denies basing Ukridge on him; he says that Ukridge was based on a man named Craxton whom William Townend, Wodehouse's friend of school days, had described to Wodehouse, and, on another man Wodehouse knew, named Westbrook. According to biographer Robert McCrum, Ukridge was inspired partly by Townend's stories about his friend Carrington Craxton, and partly by Herbert Westbrook.

== Fictional biography ==
=== Life ===
Ukridge's early years (as recounted in "Ukridge's Dog College") were not proud times; expelled from school (later revealed to be Wrykyn) for sneaking out at night to attend a local fair (he had the forethought to wear a false beard, but omitted to remove his school cap), he travelled the world in various capacities, visiting a wide number of countries and getting himself in trouble in almost all of them. It is mentioned in "Success Story" that he had once been part of a squad conducting a raid on an illegal gambling establishment in America, and that he had been involved in other raids in other locales "as a patron, as a waiter [and] as a washer of glasses."

At some point in his youth he was a schoolmaster at a private school, along with his friend Jeremy Garnet. His time in England seems to be mostly in a state of penury, although he has a wealthy aunt named Julia, who lives in the Wimbledon Common area and with whom he resides from time to time, generally upsetting by abusing her hospitality in some way.

In Love Among the Chickens, the events of which seem to occur some time after those of the shorts, Ukridge is married to Millie, a small young woman who is often described as looking like a little girl, but who is capable and cheerful despite her husband's frequent financial troubles. The events leading to their engagement are recounted in the short story "Ukridge Rounds a Nasty Corner".

=== Character ===
Standing around 6 feet 2 inches (1.88 m) tall, with large ears and a loud voice, Ukridge makes a striking figure, generally found wearing worn grey flannel trousers and a golf coat with a bright yellow Mackintosh over it; his collar is rarely properly attached to his shirt, and his pince-nez glasses are held in place with wire from a ginger beer bottle. By way of contrast, he looks exceptionally smart in evening dress (generally borrowed without permission from his friend James "Corky" Corcoran, the narrator of most of the stories).

Ukridge has a fondness for whisky and cigars. He tends to address people as "laddie" or "old horse", and his favourite exclamations are "upon my Sam" and "it's a little hard", the latter summing up his view of the treatment life invariably seems to mete out to him, although he remains forever cheerful. He always has some visionary scheme which will win him fame and fortune, but is hampered by lack of capital; in borrowing from friends he exhorts them to have "vision" and to maintain the "big, broad, flexible outlook".

Ukridge is forthright and opinionated, and likes to maintain a casual, informal atmosphere. Though rarely meaning to be rude, he often manages to offend those not used to his manner. People are overwhelmed by his personality and are persuaded to give him credit regularly, but become less civil when they find their bills unpaid. He can more than hold his own in a bar-room scrap.

He does occasionally win people over, the ex-butler Bowles who owns his friend James Corcoran's apartment building being a quite mystifying case-in-point. Ukridge exhibits no snobbery, and is often pally with members of the lower orders, domestic staff, bookies, and chaps he meets in pubs. For a time Ukridge manages the boxer "Battling" Billson, whom he met at sea.

To those who count themselves his friends (foremost among them being Corcoran, who narrates the shorts, and Jeremy Garnet, narrator of Love Among the Chickens), Ukridge is a difficult and often exasperating companion, but one who is tolerated with some affection thanks partly to his entertainment value, but also partly to his occasional bouts of selfless generosity -- on those (rare) occasions when his schemes are operating successfully, Ukridge is happy to give of his plenty. Corcoran has a lot of time for him, despite the ordeals he endures at his friend's hand, and their old schoolfellow George Tupper, a man of some wealth and distinction in the Foreign Office, has some faith in his schemes and is often generous with funds.

He is generally at loggerheads with his fearsomely proper novelist aunt, Julia Ukridge, who lives in a big house off Wimbledon Common, but has occasional periods of reconciliation, which end when he exploits his position in her house to start another scheme.

== Appearances ==
He appears in the following stories:

- Love Among the Chickens (1906), a novel about Ukridge, revised in 1921
- All 10 stories in the omnibus Ukridge (1924) (also published as He Rather Enjoyed It)
  - "Ukridge's Dog College"
  - "Ukridge's Accident Syndicate"
  - "The Debut of Battling Billson"
  - "First Aid for Dora"
  - "The Return of Battling Billson"
  - "Ukridge Sees Her Through"
  - "No Wedding Bells for Him"
  - "The Long Arm of Looney Coote"
  - "The Exit of Battling Billson"
  - "Ukridge Rounds a Nasty Corner"
- "Ukridge and the Home from Home", "The Come-back of Battling Billson", and "The Level Business Head", which all appear in Lord Emsworth and Others (1937)
- "A Bit of Luck for Mabel", "Buttercup Day" and "Ukridge and the Old Stepper", collected in Eggs, Beans and Crumpets (1940)
- "Success Story" from the collection Nothing Serious (1950)
- "A Tithe for Charity" from A Few Quick Ones (1959)
- "Ukridge Starts a Bank Account" from Plum Pie (1966)

== Adaptations ==
Four Ukridge stories were adapted for radio between January and April 1940, and broadcast on the BBC Home Service, with Malcolm Graeme as Ukridge. William Hutchison voiced Corky in the first two episodes, and Noel Dryden voiced Corky in the last two episodes.

In 1956, six Ukridge stories were adapted for radio for the BBC Light Programme, starring Michael Shepley as Stanley Ukridge and Hubert Gregg as Corcoran.

A 1959 BBC Light Programme radio drama titled "Battling Billson's Last Fight" starred Naunton Wayne as Stanley Ukridge, William Fox as Corky, and Trevor Martin as Battling Billson.

In 1968, the BBC made seven 30-minute adaptations of Ukridge's adventures as part of the television series The World of Wodehouse. He was played by Anton Rodgers, with Julian Holloway as Corky.

Six Ukridge stories were adapted for radio and aired on BBC Radio 4 between 1992 and 1993, dramatised by Julian Dutton and produced by Sarah Smith. Ukridge was played by Griff Rhys Jones, Corky by Robert Bathurst, and other members of the cast included Julian Dutton, Simon Godley, Adam Godley and Rebecca Front.

== See also ==
- A complete list of Wodehouse's Ukridge stories
