= Doctor Sally =

1932 novel by P. G. Wodehouse

- First edition
- Author: P. G. Wodehouse
- Language: English
- Genre: Comic novel
- Publisher: Methuen & Co.
- Publication date: 7 April 1932
- Publication place: United Kingdom
- Media type: Print

Doctor Sally is a short novel by P. G. Wodehouse, first published in the United Kingdom on 7 April 1932 by Methuen & Co., London. In the United States, it was serialised in Collier's Weekly from 4 July to 1 August 1931 under the title The Medicine Girl, and was included under that name in the US collection The Crime Wave at Blandings (1937).

The novel was adapted from Wodehouse's play, Good Morning, Bill (1927), which was itself based on a work by the Hungarian playwright Ladislaus Fodor.

The story tells of golf expert Dr. Sally Smith, and of Bill Bannister, who loves her.

== Plot ==
At golfing seaside resort Bingley-on-Sea, nerve specialist Sir Hugo Drake is impressed by the golfing skill of Dr. Sally Smith, an American general practitioner. Sir Hugo tells her he is looking for his nephew William "Bill" Bannister. Bill was seen with a woman of flashy appearance at Bingley. Bill is rich and impulsive, with a habit of falling in love at first sight. Sir Hugo regards himself as a father figure to Bill, and has come to take him back to Bill's country house, Woollam Chersey in Hampshire. Nearby in a hotel, "Squiffy" Bixby, Lord Tidmouth, who has divorced four times, sees his first ex-wife, Charlotte "Lottie" Higginbotham, who has a maid, Marie. Lottie was formerly on the stage but married a rich man. She is now a widow, and sort of engaged to Bill, an old friend of Tidmouth's. Bill does not want to marry Lottie anymore. Tidmouth explains this tactlessly to Lottie and she faints. Bill tells the hotel bell-boy and also Tidmouth to get a doctor. To Bill's surprise, the bell-boy brings Sally, whom Bill has fallen in love with. Bill nervously confesses his feelings for her. Sally says in an unemotional way that if she ever loves a man she will inform him simply as if she were saying good morning, but says she still has not met the right man. Tidmouth brings another doctor, Sir Hugo. Sir Hugo agrees with Sally that Lottie only needs rest and tells Bill to go home.

Around two weeks later, Bill, Sir Hugo, and Tidmouth are all at Bill's country house. Bill is in a bad mood because of his unrequited love for Sally, though Sir Hugo thinks he is pining for Lottie. Sir Hugo invites Lottie to the house, believing that in the old aristocratic manor, she will be clearly out of place and Bill will lose interest in her. Bill confides in Tidmouth that he is in love with Sally and that he telephoned her earlier. Pretending to be his own valet, he told her that Bill was seriously ill and needed a doctor so that she would come. Bill keeps all this secret from his busybody uncle. Sally reflects that she finds Bill agreeable but she does not want to marry an idle person who does not work and lives on inherited money. When Sally arrives at the house, she sees that Bill is healthy and remains aloof when he tries to tell her his feelings again. It is late, and Sally decides to sleep in a room in the house. Lottie arrives, and Tidmouth tries to tell Bill that they have a visitor, but Bill mistakenly thinks Tidmouth is referring to Sally. Sally sees Lottie at the house and thinks she and Bill are still romantically involved.

The next morning, Sir Hugo learns from Bill that a lady arrived the previous night and, thinking Bill is referring to Lottie, is disappointed when Bill says that he loves her. Sir Hugo tells Lottie he does not want Bill to marry her. At first she is insulted, but Sir Hugo convinces her that she would be bored with Bill, who does not like dancing or partying in town like she does. She is much more similar to Tidmouth. Lottie and Tidmouth agree that they suit each other and want to get married again. Tidmouth informs Sally that Lottie is only at the house because she was invited by Sir Hugo. Bill finally makes it clear to Sir Hugo that he loves Sally, which pleases Sir Hugo, who greatly admires Sally's skill at golf. Sally continues to turn down Bill until she sees him do some paperwork for his dairy farm. Seeing that he does in fact work, she now loves him and says good morning to him.

== Publication history ==
The story was serialised in Collier's (US) from 4 July to 1 August 1931 under the title The Medicine Girl, and in the Yorkshire Weekly Post Illustrated (UK) between 2 January and 27 February 1932 with the title Doctor Sally. The serial in Collier's was illustrated by Wallace Morgan.

The Medicine Girl was printed in the Book of the Week Club, a supplement to the Syracuse Herald, on 19 September 1937. It was included in the 1940 collection Wodehouse on Golf, published by Doubleday, Doran and Company, New York.
