= The Debut of Battling Billson =

1923 short story by P. G. Wodehouse

- Short story by P. G. Wodehouse
- 1923 Strand illustration by Reginald Cleaver
- Country: United Kingdom
- Language: English
- Genre: Comedy

Publication
- Publisher: Cosmopolitan (US); Strand (UK)
- Media type: Print (Magazine)
- Publication date: June 1923 (US); July 1923 (UK)

"The Debut of Battling Billson" is a short story by P. G. Wodehouse, which first appeared in the United States in the June 1923 issue of Cosmopolitan and in the United Kingdom in the July 1923 Strand. It features the irrepressible Stanley Featherstonehaugh Ukridge, and was included in the collection Ukridge, published in 1924.

== Plot ==
Ukridge, observing the wealth displayed by a prominent boxing manager, resolves to get in on the game himself, and thus make his fortune. By good fortune, an old acquaintance of his from his world-roaming days, an enormous and powerful sailor named Billson, famed for his ability to mop up stevedores by the dozen in bar fights, has landed in England and is looking for shore work, having fallen for a barmaid named Flossie. Ukridge scoops him up, and the two visit James Corcoran prior to heading to the training ground.

Arriving at his first fight, Billson (now dubbed "Battling Billson") meets his opponent, and is touched by the man's life story. In the ring, this sentimentality affects his performance, until a few strong blows enrage him; he is, however, hesitant, and is knocked out when distracted.

Ukridge hears that the champion, Tod Bingham, is offering substantial prizes to anyone who can go two rounds with him; he puts his man forward. To ensure Billson's fighting instinct is not weakened by the man's reputation for kindness to his mother, Ukridge persuades Ukridge's girl Flossie to write a letter claiming she has been wooed away from him by the other fighter. This entails taking the girl out for dinner, on their friend George Tupper, who is mortified by the girl's plebeian dress and manners.

When the day of the prize bout arrives, Corky and Ukridge stand in the crowd, excitedly awaiting Billson's fight. However, the compere announces that the champ has been hit by a truck and will be unable to fight, to the disgust of all. Outside the hall, they encounter a bystander, who describes the "truck" that hit Bingham as an enormous, red-headed man in full rage - if only he'd thought to save his fighting for the ring, says the man, he could have made a tidy sum.

Billson would return in several other Ukridge stories.

== Main characters ==
- Stanley Featherstonehaugh Ukridge, the irrepressible entrepreneur
- James Corcoran, Ukridge's writer friend
  - Bowles, Corky's landlord, an ex-butler
- George Tupper, an old schoolfriend of Ukridge and Corcoran
- "Battling" Billson, an enormous sailor, friend of Ukridge
  - Flossie, Bilson's girl, a barmaid
- Tod Bingham, middle-weight boxing champion

== Publication history ==
The story was illustrated by T. D. Skidmore in Cosmopolitan, and by Reginald Cleaver in The Strand Magazine.

It was included in The World of Ukridge, a collection of Ukridge stories published in October 1975 by Barrie & Jenkins.

== Adaptations ==
The story was adapted for radio in 1940 and broadcast on the BBC Home Service, with Malcolm Graeme as Ukridge, Noel Dryden as Corky, William Trent as Bowles, Charles Mason as George Tupper, Philip Wade as Wilberforce Billson, Vivienne Chatterton as Florence Burns, and Geoffrey Wincott as Professor Devine.

It was adapted for television in 1968 as the third episode of the second series of The World of Wodehouse.

The second episode of The Adventures of Ukridge (1992–93), a radio series that first aired on BBC Radio 4, was based on the story. The stories were adapted by Julian Dutton. The cast of "The Debut of Battling Billson" included Griff Rhys Jones as Ukridge, Robert Bathurst as Corky, Adam Godley as Tupper, Simon Godley as Beamish, Dougal Lee as Bowles and Billson, Rebecca Front as Millie and Flossie, and Julian Dutton as Professor Devine.

== See also ==
- List of Wodehouse's Ukridge stories
