= Love Among the Chickens =

1906 novel by P. G. Wodehouse

- First edition (UK)
- Author: P. G. Wodehouse
- Language: English
- Series: Ukridge
- Genre: Comic novel
- Publisher: George Newnes
- Publication date: June 1906
- Publication place: United Kingdom

Love Among the Chickens is a novel by P. G. Wodehouse, first published as a book in the United Kingdom in June 1906 by George Newnes, London, and in the United States by Circle Publishing, New York, on 11 May 1909. It had already appeared there as a serial in Circle magazine between September 1908 and March 1909. The English edition was dedicated "to Sir Bargrave and Lady Deane"; the Rt Hon Sir Henry Bargrave Deane QC was a High Court judge and a cousin of Wodehouse's mother.

In 1921, Wodehouse revised the book. In the 1906 version, the first five chapters were narrated in the third person, before shifting to the first person. The new version was narrated entirely in the first person and had a slightly different ending. The new edition was published in May 1921 by Herbert Jenkins and carried an extended dedication to Wodehouse's old school friend, Bill Townend, in which Wodehouse thanked his friend for the original idea for the story and commented that "...I have practically re-written the book. There was some pretty bad work in it..."

This is the only novel to feature the recurring character Stanley Featherstonehaugh Ukridge, whose appearances are otherwise confined to short stories.

== Plot introduction ==
The novel is narrated by Jeremy Garnet, an author and old friend of Ukridge. Seeing Ukridge for the first time in years, with a new wife in tow, Garnet finds himself dragged along on holiday to Ukridge's new chicken farm in Dorset. The novel intertwines Garnet's difficult wooing of a girl living nearby with the struggles of the farm, which are exacerbated by Ukridge's bizarre business ideas and methods.

== Plot summary ==
Jeremy Garnet, hearing that his old friend Ukridge has called while he was out, and fearing that the peace he needs to plan his next book is about to be disturbed, decides to leave London for a time. But he is too late. Ukridge arrives, with his wife Millie in tow and immediately starts explaining his new get-rich-quick scheme, involving producing hen's eggs on a farm in Dorset. Giving in to Ukridge's forceful personality, Garnet agrees to accompany him to the farm; there will, Ukridge assures him, be plenty of golf and sea-bathing available. On the train to Dorset, they are joined in a compartment by a pretty, brown-haired girl named Phyllis and her elderly Irish father. By coincidence, Phyllis is reading a copy of Garnet's new novel, given to her by Molly MacEachern.

They arrive at the house, meet hired man Beale and his wife, and settle in. Next day a consignment of hens arrives, and they spend some busy days putting up fences and building coops; Ukridge buys various supplies on credit, and begins to arrange to supply eggs to various outlets. One day, chasing an escaped hen, Garnet tumbles into a garden where he stumbles upon Phyllis, the girl from the train, her father Professor Derrick, and a friendly young navy lieutenant named Tom Chase, whose familiarity with Phyllis irks Garnet. They recapture the chicken, and Garnet is invited to lunch, stays to play croquet afterwards, and his love for Phyllis is sealed.

Soon the Ukridges invite their new neighbours over for dinner, but the cat gets stuck up the chimney and they are unable to cook. Fed cold food, and upset by Ukridge's small talk, especially on the topic of Irish Home Rule, the Professor storms out, and Garnet finds himself in his beloved's father's bad books.

The chickens become ill, and Garnet, on his way to fetch help, runs into Phyllis, who shows him some friendliness. Later, bathing at the beach, he spies the Professor, fishing from a boat. He hatches a plan, bribes a local, Harry Hawk, to upset the Professor's boat, and saves him from the sea, restoring the man's faith in him. He visits Phyllis, but is interrupted in his wooing by Chase, who hints that he is wise to Garnet's boat plot, and thrashes Garnet at tennis.

With the chicken farm struggling, a local informs Derrick of Garnet's boat plot, and he finds himself once again despised. He buries himself in the farm and his writing, but after a week he comes across Phyillis alone, and explains his actions to her. He declares his love, and she returns it, revealing that Chase is in fact engaged to her sister Norah, but adds that her father, loathing Garnet, would never consent to them marrying. On Ukridge's advice, they beard the man in the sea, and Garnet announces his love for Phyllis, but only makes Derrick angrier.

Garnet finds himself up against the Professor in the final of a local golf tournament, which, he has learned, the Professor has long been desperate to win. He plays a bad game, and wins the Professor round, giving him the match but winning his consent. Returning to the farm, he finds that the Ukridges have disappeared, apparently bolted to London to flee their creditors.

A swarm of said creditors arrive, and begin ransacking the farm; they have turned to the chickens when Ukridge returns, bearing wealth courtesy of Millie's Aunt Elizabeth. He berates the assembled throng, and sends them off with fleas in their ears. Later, Garnet finds Ukridge on the beach, and hears of his plan to start up a duck farm.

== Characters ==
- Stanley Featherstonehaugh Ukridge, the irrepressible entrepreneur
  - Millie, his new wife
    - Beale, their hired man
- Jeremy Garnet, a friend of Ukridge, a novelist
- Professor Derrick, Ukridge's Irish neighbour
  - Phyllis, the professor's daughter
    - Tom Chase, their house-guest
- Harry Hawk, a local man, who hires out his boat to fishermen
- Aunt Elizabeth, a temperamental hen, named after Millie's aunt

== Publication history ==
The first UK edition of the book, published June 1906, featured three illustrations and a frontispiece by H. M. Brock. In the US magazine Circle, the story was serialised from September 1908 to March 1909 and illustrated by Armand Both. The frontispiece and five illustrations in the first US edition book, published 11 May 1909, were by Armand Both.

This was the first book by Wodehouse to be published separately in the U.S. The books that had appeared there before had all been printed from imported plates of the UK edition by Macmillan, New York, between 1902 and 1907. These included The Pothunters, A Prefect's Uncle, Tales of St. Austin's, William Tell Told Again, and The White Feather, the last of which was first published in the UK after Love Among the Chickens.

== See also ==
- List of Wodehouse's Ukridge stories
