= The World of Wodehouse =

British TV comedy series (1967–1968)

- Scene from "Lord Emsworth and the Girl Friend", with McAllister (Radcliffe), Gladys (Jones), and Lord Emsworth (Richardson)
- Genre: Comedy
- Based on: Blandings Castle and Ukridge stories by P. G. Wodehouse
- Written by: John Chapman (Blandings Castle); Richard Waring (Ukridge)
- Starring: Ralph Richardson (Blandings Castle); Anton Rodgers (Ukridge)
- Composers: Ron Grainer (Blandings Castle); Arthur Wilkinson (Ukridge)
- Country of origin: United Kingdom
- Original language: English
- No. of series: 2
- No. of episodes: 13

Production
- Producers: Michael Mills and Frank Muir (Blandings Castle); Joan Kemp-Welch (Ukridge)
- Running time: 30 minutes

Original release
- Network: BBC1
- Release: 24 February 1967 – 26 August 1968

Related
- The World of Wooster

The World of Wodehouse is a comedy television series, based on the Blandings Castle and Ukridge stories written by P. G. Wodehouse.

The series, which followed the television series The World of Wooster, was shown on BBC Television. It consisted of two series, the 1967 Blandings Castle series (six episodes) and the 1968 Ukridge series (seven episodes).

Apart from one or more extracts from one episode of Blandings Castle ("Lord Emsworth and the Girl Friend"), all episodes of both Blandings Castle and Ukridge are lost.

== Cast members ==
=== Blandings Castle ===
- Ralph Richardson as Lord Emsworth (6 episodes)
- Meriel Forbes as Lady Constance Keeble (6 episodes)
- Stanley Holloway as Beach (6 episodes)
- Jack Radcliffe as McAllister (6 episodes)
- Derek Nimmo as Freddie Threepwood (3 episodes)

=== Ukridge ===
Anton Rodgers as Ukridge

- Anton Rodgers as Stanley Ukridge (7 episodes)
- Julian Holloway as Corky (7 episodes)
- Marian Spencer as Aunt Julia (4 episodes)
- Kenneth Thornett as Bowles (3 episodes)
- Noel Davis as Tupper (3 episodes)
- Hugh Latimer as Barter (3 episodes)

== Background and production ==
The World of Wodehouse was created as a result of the success of the BBC television series The World of Wooster, which aired from May 1965 to November 1967. The six episodes of the Blandings Castle series, which aired in early 1967, were screened before the third series of The World of Wooster, which was broadcast later that year.

Michael Mills and Frank Muir produced the episodes based on P. G. Wodehouse's Blandings Castle stories, which were adapted by John Chapman. Joan Kemp-Welch produced the episodes based on Wodehouse's Ukridge stories, which were adapted by Richard Waring. The episodes for both series were each approximately 30 minutes long.

Exterior shots of Blandings Castle were filmed at Penshurst Place.

The music for the Blandings Castle series was composed by Ron Grainer. Arthur Wilkinson composed the music for the Ukridge series.

Penguin Books, which had previously published Jeeves books with covers featuring full-colour promotional images from The World of Wooster, published tie-in Blandings books with covers featuring promotional images from The World of Wodehouse in December 1966.

Derek Nimmo, who played Freddie Threepwood in the Blandings Castle series, also played Bingo Little in several episodes of The World of Wooster. Both Anton Rodgers and Julian Holloway, who played Ukridge and Corky respectively in the Ukridge series, had previously played other roles in the third series of The World of Wooster. Rodgers also portrayed Rupert Baxter in the third episode of the Blandings Castle series, "Lord Emsworth and the Crime Wave at Blandings".

== Episodes ==
=== Series overview ===
Series	Episodes	Originally released	
Series	Episodes	First released	Last released
Blandings Castle	6	24 February 1967	31 March 1967
Ukridge	7	15 July 1968	26 August 1968

=== Blandings Castle (1967) ===
No. overall	No. in series	Title	Adaption of	Original release date
1	1	"Lord Emsworth and the Girl Friend"	"Lord Emsworth and the Girl Friend"	24 February 1967
Guest appearances: Gaynor Jones as Gladys, Freddie Foote as Ern, Cyril Luckham as the vicar
2	2	"The Great Pumpkin Crisis"	"The Custody of the Pumpkin"	3 March 1967
Guest appearances: Derek Nimmo as Freddie Threepwood, Jimmy Edwards as Sir Gregory Parsloe-Parsloe, Alfred Marks as Mr Donaldson, Lynn Rainbow as Aggie
3	3	"Lord Emsworth and the Crime Wave at Blandings"	"The Crime Wave at Blandings"	10 March 1967
Guest appearances: Anton Rodgers as Rupert Baxter, Celia Bannerman as Jane, Peter Jesson as George Abercrombie, Robert Davies as George
4	4	"Lord Emsworth Acts for the Best"	"Lord Emsworth Acts for the Best"	17 March 1967
Guest appearances: Derek Nimmo as Freddie Threepwood, Cyril Luckham as the vicar, Lynn Rainbow as Aggie, Wanda Ventham as Jane
5	5	"Pig Hoo-oo-ey!"	"Pig-hoo-o-o-o-ey"	24 March 1967
Guest appearances: Angela Thorne as Angela, James Hayter as Smithers, Derek Waring as James Belford
6	6	"Lord Emsworth and the Company for Gertrude"	"Company for Gertrude"	31 March 1967
Guest appearances: Derek Nimmo as Freddie Threepwood, Jimmy Edwards as Sir Gregory Parsloe-Parsloe, Richard Klee as Cyril Wellbeloved, Leslie Phillips as the Rev. Esmond Gander, Marilyn Taylerson as Gertrude

=== Ukridge (1968) ===
No. overall	No. in series	Title	Adaption of	Original release date
7	1	"The Home from Home"	"Ukridge and the Home from Home"	15 July 1968
Guest appearances: Marian Spencer as Aunt Julia, David Langton as Col. Bagnew, Tim Barrett as Victor Beamish, Hugh Latimer as Barter, Eric Dodson as Mr. Wapshott, Joan Benham as Lady Bastable
8	2	"The Dog College"	"Ukridge's Dog College"	22 July 1968
Guest appearances: Marian Spencer as Aunt Julia, Hugh Latimer as Barter, John Blythe as Joe, Kenneth Thornett as Bowles, Noel Davis as Tupper, Harry Davis as the Barman, Damaris Hayman as Angelica Vining
9	3	"The Debut of Battling Billson"	"The Debut of Battling Billson"	29 July 1968
Guest appearances: Dickie Owen as Battling Billson, Kenneth Thornett as Bowles, Noel Davis as Tuppf, Harry Davis as the Barman, Robin Wentworth as Billson's second, Pamela Cundell as Flossie Burns
10	4	"The Accident Syndicate"	"Ukridge's Accident Syndicate"	5 August 1968
Guest appearances: Tim Barrett as Victor Beamish, John Fraser as Teddy Weeks, Tony Bateman as Gussy, Arthur Cox as Freddie
11	5	"The Comeback of Battling Billson"	"The Come-back of Battling Billson" and "Buttercup Day"	12 August 1968
Guest appearances: Marian Spencer as Aunt Julia, Hugh Latimer as Barter, Dickie Owen as Battling Billson, Harry Davis as the Barman, Brian Oulton as Stuttering Sam, Debbie Bowen as the Buttercup girl
12	6	"The Nasty Corner"	"Ukridge Rounds a Nasty Corner"	19 August 1968
Guest appearances: Marian Spencer as Aunt Julia, Kenneth Thornett as Bowles, Noel Davis as Tupper, Margaretta Scott as Lady Lakenham, Patrick Waddington as Sir Rupert Lakenham, Janie Booth as Millie Lakenham
13	7	"The Wedding Bells"	"No Wedding Bells for Him"	26 August 1968
Guest appearances: Bernadette Milnes as Mabel Price, Julian Orchard as Looney Coote, Fred Hugh as Mr Grindley

== See also ==
- List of Wodehouse's Ukridge characters
