= Scott Meredith =

American literary agent (1923–1993)

Scott Meredith (born Arthur Scott Feldman; November 24, 1923, New York City, NY – February 11, 1993, Manhasset, NY) was a prominent American literary agent, and founder of the Scott Meredith Literary Agency. His clients included famous and successful writers such as Ed McBain, Evan Hunter, Richard S. Prather, Morris West, Norman Mailer, J. G. Ballard, Arthur C. Clarke, P. G. Wodehouse, Ann Rule, Philip K. Dick and Margaret Truman.

== Early life and career ==
The youngest of three children born to Russian Jewish immigrants Harry and Esther Feldman, Scott attended Thomas Jefferson High School in Brooklyn. While still in his teens, he began working as assistant editorial director under Harry Shorten at MLJ Magazines, for whom—as Scott Feldman—he also wrote a number of short fiction pieces, published in Pep Comics, Zip Comics, Jackpot Comics and Top Notch Laugh Comics. In 1946 he founded the Scott Meredith Literary Agency with his brother, Sidney Meredith. Their first client was P.G. Wodehouse. During Scott Meredith's career, he innovated many of the basic practices of his field. Such innovations included attention to foreign rights, tie-ins with movies, and auctioning rights to publishers.

In the early 1950s, he employed Milton Lesser and then Evan Hunter. Each in turn left in order to become full-time writers. Other employees included Barry N. Malzberg and Lawrence Block.

His book Writing to Sell was praised by Richard S. Prather.
