= Reginald Cleaver =

British cartoonist

Reginald Thomas Cleaver (died 1954) was a British cartoonist notable for his work for Punch and The Daily Graphic.
