= List of art dealers =

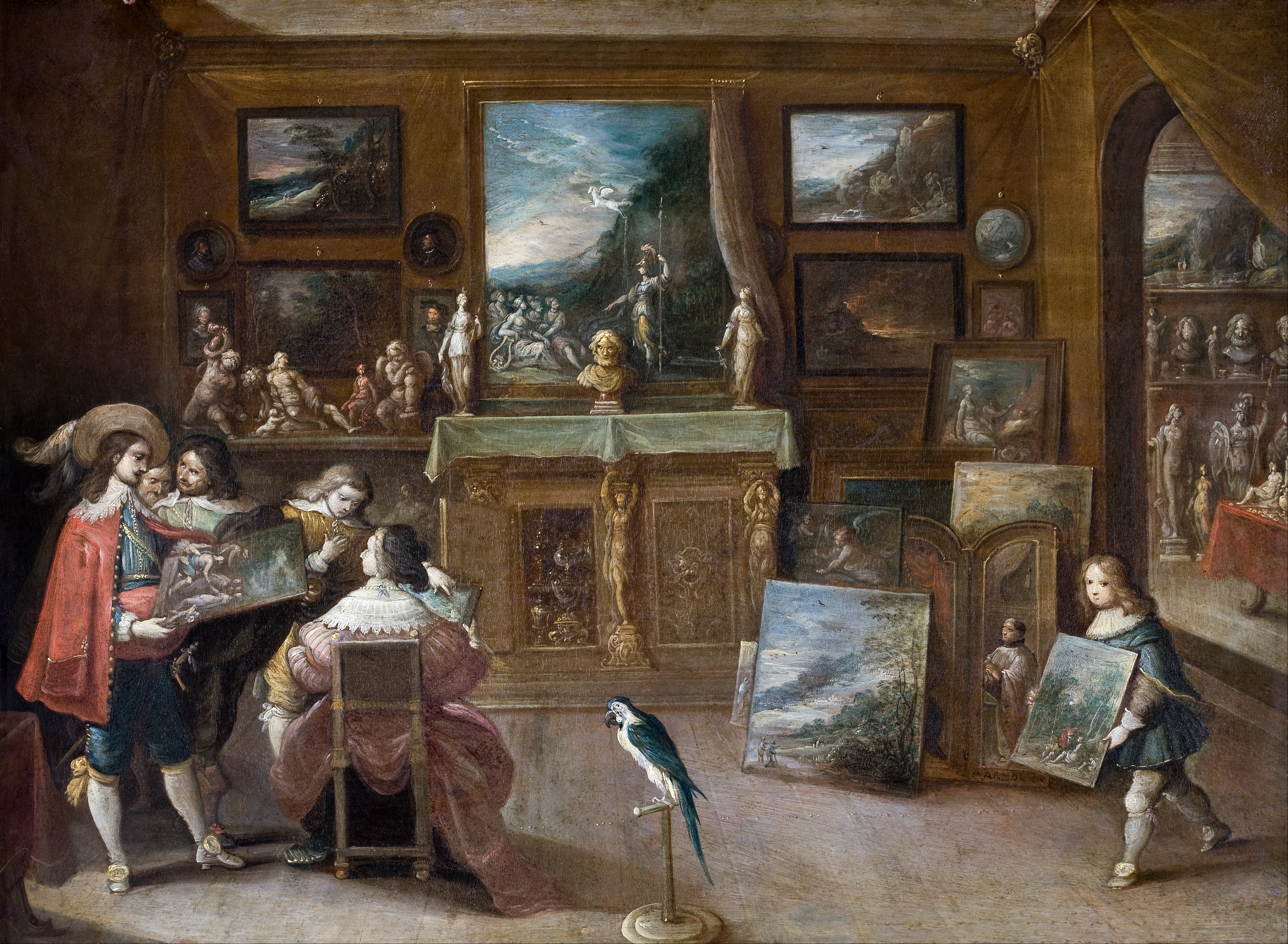
A visit to the Art Dealer by Frans Francken the Younger, early 1600s

This is a list of art dealers.

- Guillam Forchondt the Elder (1608–1678): A 17th-century Flemish Baroque painter and art dealer based in Antwerp. He established an important art dealing business with international connections in Europe maintained by his extended family. He originally trained as a painter and cabinet maker but built a reputation through his international art business. His children became art dealers who settled in various cities in Europe such as Venice, Paris, Vienna, Prague, Linz, Passau and Cádiz where they supplied an elite clientele with a variety of art objects. When in the 1670s Flanders suffered a severe economic downturn due mostly to an invasion by the French, Guillam Forchondt and his brother Melchior the Younger became art entrepreneurs by hiring lesser painters to create group projects such as large commissioned copies of famous works or large decorative objects. At one point, the Brothers Forchondt had 60 painters in service for export to France, Austria, Spain and Portugal.
- Matthijs Musson (Antwerp, 1598–3 November 1678): A painter and art dealer based in Antwerp, who helped popularize artists of the 17th century Antwerp school by marketing them throughout Europe. Many of his correspondences have been published and studies of his business relationships with other dealers across Europe have established ideas about the art trade and its economics.
- Larry Gagosian (born 1945): Head of the multimillion-dollar Gagosian Gallery group.
- Arne Glimcher (born 1938): Glimcher is the founder of The Pace Gallery and is widely known as one of the art world's most powerful dealers. The Pace Gallery represents contemporary artists including Chuck Close, Tara Donovan, David Hockney, Maya Lin and Kiki Smith. It also represents the estates of several artists, including Pablo Picasso, Agnes Martin, Ad Reinhardt, and Alexander Calder. During his career he has worked closely with important artists including Jean Dubuffet, Robert Rauschenberg, Louise Nevelson, and Lucas Samaras. In 2007, Glimcher received the Distinguished Alumni Award from the Massachusetts College of Art and Design.
- Edith Halpert (1900–1970): Halpert was born in 1900 in Odesa, arrived in the U.S. as a penniless Russian Jewish immigrant and grew to become a pioneering New York City art dealer, transforming the landscape of Modern art. Over her forty-year career from 1926 through the 1960s, Halpert brought recognition and market success to many avant-garde American artists. Her establishment The Downtown Gallery, one of the first in Greenwich Village, introduced and showcased many modern art luminaries. Halpert died at age 70 a multimillionaire, with Sotheby's crediting her with having put modernist painting auctions on the map. The posthumous sale of her collection by Sotheby's went for $3.6 million in 1973.
- Klaus Perls: Perls (1912–2008) was born and raised in Berlin. He studied art history in Munich, but was forced to finish his education in Basel, Switzerland, as the Nazis were no longer allowing degrees for Jews. He ran Perls Galleries for over 60 years. His gallery dealt with contemporary American artists, modern works from the School of Paris and Mexican and South American art. Perls also developed an interest in art from Benin and built a sizable collection. He was not only an art dealer, but also a donor as he contributed many significant works of art to the Metropolitan Museum of Art. He died June 2, 2008, in Mount Kisco, N.Y. at age 96.
- Martha Hopkins Struever: Struever was born in 1931 in Milan, Indiana. She attended the Tobé-Coburn School For Fashion Careers in New York City, after obtaining her Bachelor of Science degree from Purdue University in Lafayette, Indiana in 1953. She began collecting and dealing in American Indian art in 1971, and is regarded as a leading scholar on historic and contemporary Pueblo Indian pottery and Pueblo and Navajo Indian jewelry. She has authored books on Charles Loloma, the foremost American Indian jeweler, and Dextra Quotskuyva, the pre-eminent contemporary Hopi potter, as well as exhibition catalogues on Hopi potter Iris Nampeyo and other Hopi art, and has guest curated museum shows in several cities.
- Jacques Seligmann: German-born Seligmann (1858–1923) moved to Paris in 1874 where he set up an antiquarian business in 1880. Benefiting from the interest of clients such as Edmond de Rothschild, he moved to the Place Vendôme in 1900 and in 1904 opened an office in New York. In 1909, he acquired the Hôtel de Monaco in Paris where he was able to impress his more important clients such as the Russian Stroganoff family and the high-flying British politician Sir Philip Sassoon. In New York, he developed an interest in European art attracting collectors such as Benjamin Altman, William Randolph Hearst and J. P. Morgan. On his death, his son Germain Seligman continued to run Jacques Seligmann & Company.
- John Weber (1932–2008): Weber was born in 1932 in Los Angeles. He was a radio corpsman in the Navy during the Korean War before receiving a bachelor's degree from Antioch College in Yellow Springs, Ohio in 1958. As a contemporary art dealer, Weber was ahead of his time as he was one of the early promoters of Conceptual Art, Post-Minimalist sculpture and Italian Arte Povera. He was the director of several galleries throughout his career and helped organize shows that featured big names such as Robert Indiana, Richard Long and Andy Warhol. Weber died May 23, 2008, in Hudson, N.Y. at age 75.

== Other notable art dealers (individuals) ==
=== 16th-century, 17th-century, and 18th-century births ===
- Hendrick van Uylenburgh (c. 1587–1661) and his son Gerrit van Uylenburgh (c. 1625–1679)
- Johannes de Renialme (c. 1600–1657)
- Rembrandt (mid-17th century)
- John Blackwood (1696–1777)
- Joseph Smith, often known as Consul Smith (c. 1682–1770), British consul at Venice, 1744–1760

=== 19th-century births ===
- Paul Durand-Ruel (1831–1922)
- Duveen Brothers (Joseph Joel Duveen (1843–1908) and Henry J. Duveen (1855–1918))
- Georges Petit [1856–1920)
- Theo van Gogh (1857–1891)
- Jacques Seligmann (1858–1923)
- Alfred Stieglitz (1864–1946)
- Charles Carstairs (1865–1928)
- Berthe Weill (1865–1951)
- Ambroise Vollard (1866–1939)
- Joseph Duveen, 1st Baron Duveen (1869–1939)
- Paul Cassirer (1871–1926)
- Wilhelm Uhde (1874–1947)
- Lena Börjeson (1879–1976)
- Léonce Rosenberg (1879–1947)
- Herwarth Walden (1879–1941)
- René Gimpel (1881–1945)
- Kurt Walter Bachstitz (1882–1949)
- Paul Rosenberg (1881–1959)
- Joseph Brummer (1883–1947)
- Goupil & Cie (1850–1884)
- Adolphe Goupil (1827–1884) then Boussod, Valadon & Cie, 1884–1919
- Daniel-Henry Kahnweiler (1884–1979)
- Hugo Perls (1886–1977)
- Carroll Carstairs (1888–1948)
- Léopold Zborowski (1889–1932)
- Paul Guillaume (1891–1934)
- Georges Wildenstein (1892–1963)
- Sam Salz (1894–1981)
- Katia Granoff (1895–1989)
- Sidney Janis (1896–1989)
- Samuel M. Kootz (1898–1982)
- Pierre Matisse (1900–1989)
- Betty Parsons (1900–1982)

=== 20th-century births ===
- René Drouin (1905–1979)
- Leo Castelli (1907–1999)
- Tibor de Nagy (1908–1993)
- Ileana Sonnabend (1914–2007)
- Heinz Berggruen (1914–2007)
- Daniel Wildenstein (1917–2001)
- Jock Truman (1920–2011)
- Sir Jack Baer (1924–2016)
- André Emmerich (1924–2007)
- Gregg Juarez (1925–2018)
- Ivan Karp (1926–2012)
- Richard Bellamy (1927–1998)
- Jan Krugier (1928–2008)
- Virginia Dwan (1931–2022)
- Allan Barry Stone (1932–2006)
- John Gibson (1933–2019)
- Phyllis Kind (1933–2018)
- Daniel Lelong (1933–2025)
- Gui Rochat (born 1933)
- Nicholas Wilder (1937–1989)
- Paula Cooper (born 1938)
- Giuseppe Eskenazi (born 1939)
- Robert Miller (1939–2011)
- David Whitney (1939–2005)
- Klaus Kertess (1940–2016)
- Bruno Bischofberger (born 1940)
- Anthony d'Offay (born 1940)
- Charles Cowles (born 1941)
- Daniel Templon (born 1945)
- Karsten Greve (born 1946)
- Brent Sikkema (1948–2024)
- Ann Freedman (born c. 1949)
- Mary Boone (born 1951)
- Jack Tilton (1951–2017)
- Serge Sorokko (born 1954)
- Paul Kasmin (1960–2020)
- David Zwirner (born 1964)
- Ruth-Ann Thorn (born 1965)
- Georges Bergès
- Hong Gyu Shin (born 1990)

== Companies ==
=== 18th-century establishments ===
- Colnaghi & Co (established c. 1760)

=== 19th-century establishments ===
- M Knoedler & Co (1846–2011)
