= Clifford Street =

Street in the City of Westminster, London

Coordinates: 51°30′39.87″N 0°8′28.68″W

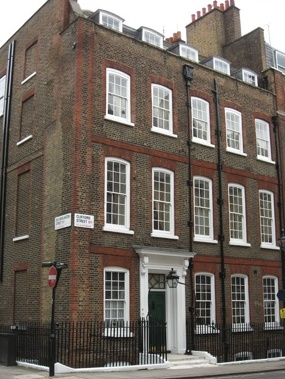
Buck's clubhouse at number 18

Clifford Street is a street in central London, built in the early 18th century, on land that once formed part of the Burlington Estate. It is named after the Clifford family, Earls of Cumberland. The daughter and heiress of the last holder of that title was the mother of the first Lord Burlington.

== Location ==
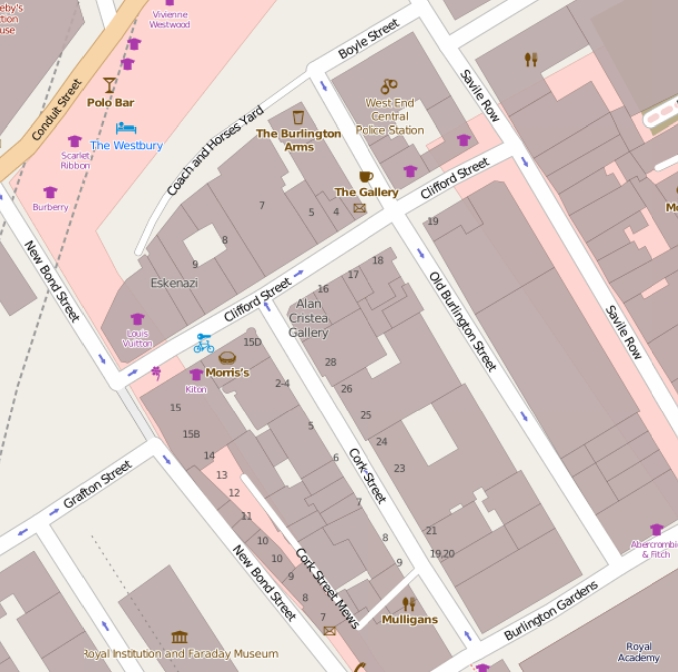
The immediate vicinity of Clifford Street

The street runs east–west from New Bond Street to Savile Row. It is crossed by Old Burlington Street, and Cork Street runs from its south side to Burlington Gardens.

== History ==
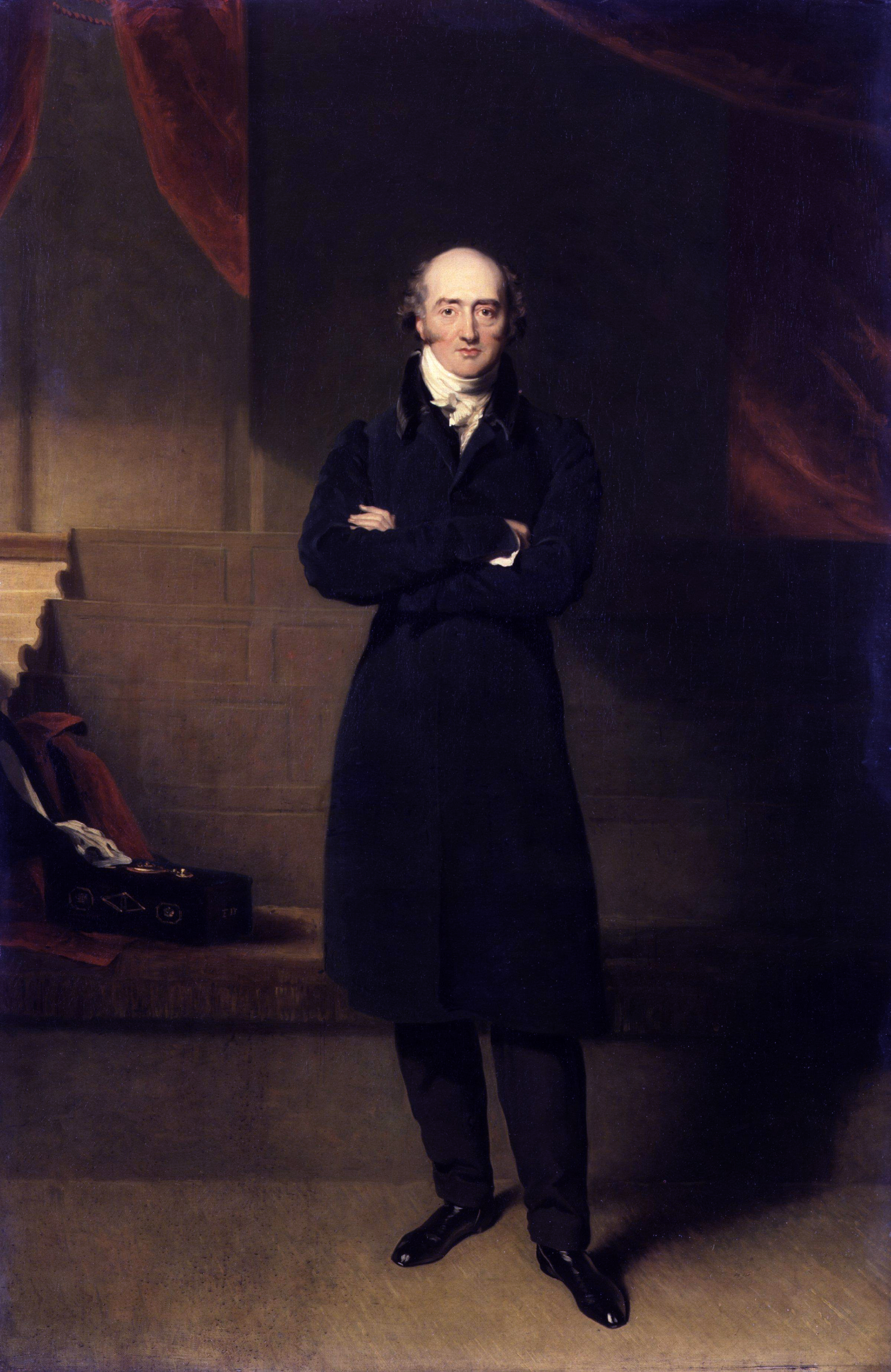
George Canning, British Prime Minister 1827, practiced his debating skills at the Clifford Street Coffee House.

The Clifford Street Club, a debating society sometimes known humorously as the Clifford Street Senate, met at the Clifford Street Coffee House at the corner of Bond Street around 1800. Among the members were Charles Townshend, the future British Prime Minister George Canning, James Mackintosh, Richard Sharp (known as "Conversation" Sharp, doyen of British conversationalists), Ollyett Woodhouse and Charles Moore. The discussion was of a political nature, usually from a Liberal perspective, and the staple drink was large jugs of porter. Topics included the consequences of the French Revolution.

Henry Addington, 1st Viscount Sidmouth, British Prime Minister 1801–04, lived at number 7 (now demolished and replaced) between 1805 and 1808 and 1816–24.

Admiral Sir Eliab Harvey, who had commanded the Téméraire at the Battle of Trafalgar in 1805, lived at number 8 until his death in 1830.

Buck's clubhouse at number 18, the home of Buck's Club established in 1919, was where the cocktail Bucks Fizz, and possibly the Sidecar, were invented. It was one of the models for The Drones Club in the stories of P.G. Wodehouse.

== Listed buildings ==
Clifford Street contains a number of listed buildings. Numbers 4, 5 9, 16 and 17 are all listed with English Heritage.

Number 8 Clifford Street, graded class II*, has a staircase hall panelled and frescoed in monochrome trompe-l'œil that is attributed to Sir James Thornhill.

== Shops ==
3 Clifford Street is home to Drakes, the gentlemen's luxury accessories label, since 2011.

Eskenazi, one of the world's leading dealers in Chinese art and artifacts, run by Giuseppe Eskenazi, has been based at 10 Clifford Street since 1993.

The Maas Gallery, a commercial art gallery, is at 15A.

15B is home to Morris's Cafe, a well established coffee shop and restaurant for well over 35 years. It is well known within the local community, and the likes of Rod Stewart and Bernie Ecclestone have been regulars.

Lutwyche, the gentleman's tailor and shoemaker are at number 15.

W. & H. Gidden, established in 1806, are located at number 16 and hold a Royal Warrant as saddlers to Her Majesty Queen Elizabeth II.

Anderson & Sheppard, the gentlemen's tailor with a Royal Warrant from Prince Charles, have been at number 17 since 2012.
