= Kylie Susan James =

British art-market professional and director

- Occupations: Business executive; Art-market professional
- Known for: Director of the London Art Exchange

Kylie Susan James is a British art-market professional and director of the London Art Exchange. She is also a director of the London Auction Xchange.

== Career ==
James joined London Art Exchange as a director in January 2023.

In a 2026 interview with The Mayfair Musings, James discussed her earlier work in finance, property and luxury assets and her subsequent involvement in the art market. She also spoke about changes in the way people collect and engage with art.

HENI, an international art-services company and publisher, has published material about James's work at London Art Exchange and her views on artist development and the use of technology in the art market.

In September 2026, Luxury London quoted James in an article about insurance for art and other luxury possessions. The article identified her as head of London Art Exchange and LAX.Bid, its digital auction platform.

James has discussed London Art Exchange's plans to use digital ledger technology for payments, artwork verification and ownership records.

In March 2026, James was appointed a director of London Auction Xchange Ltd.

== See also ==
- List of art dealers
- List of people from London
