= The Passing Show (disambiguation) =

The Passing Show was a musical revue from 1894 to 1924. See specifically The Passing Show of 1916 and The Passing Show of 1918 for the revues of those years.

Passing Show or The Passing Show may also refer to:

- The Passing Show (magazine), a British weekly magazine published from 1915 to 1939.
- The Passing Show (TV series), a British TV series broadcast from 1951 to 1953.
