= Bachelors' Club =

London gentlemen's club

Coordinates: 51.5051°N 0.1466°W

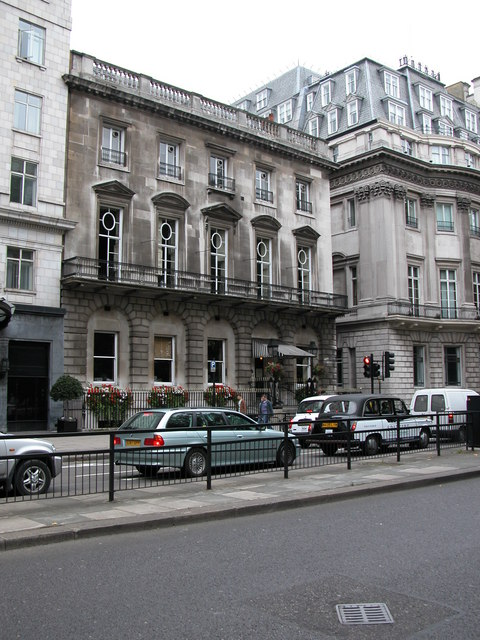
The club's building, 106 Piccadilly, in 2006

The Bachelors' Club was a London gentlemen's club in the late nineteenth and early twentieth century, now defunct. As the name suggests, membership was only open to bachelors. The club had a reputation for having a markedly younger membership than many other Edwardian clubs, and given the high-spirited antics which sometimes ensued on the premises, it was cited (along with Buck's and the Bath Club) as an influence on the fictional Drones Club, in some of P.G. Wodehouse's earlier stories. A persistent rumour circulated throughout its existence, and reached wider circulation in the 1920s, that some of its membership were gay - then both illegal and publicly frowned upon – and it soon became superseded by Buck's as the young man's club in London, being forced to close shortly thereafter.

The club was first situated at 11 Hamilton Place, then at 8 South Audley Street, and finally it amalgamated with the St. James's Club in 1946 at 106 Piccadilly. Famous members included John Buchan, Field Marshal Sir Herbert Kitchener, and Capt. Berkeley Levett, a witness in the Royal Baccarat Scandal.

== See also ==
- List of London's gentlemen's clubs
