= Drones Club =

Fictional club in stories by P. G. Wodehouse

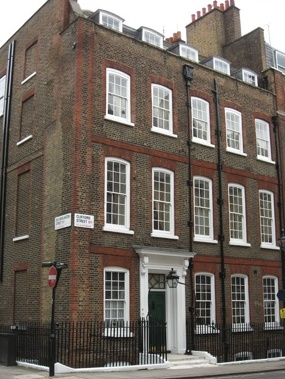
Buck's clubhouse at 18 Clifford Street, London, one of the clubs on which The Drones was based.

The Drones Club is a recurring fictional location in the stories of British humorist P. G. Wodehouse. It is a gentlemen's club in London. Many of Wodehouse's Jeeves and Blandings Castle stories feature the club or its members.

Various members of the club appear in stories included in the "Drones Club series", which contains stories not already included in other series. Most of the Drones Club stories star either Freddie Widgeon or Bingo Little. The club is initially introduced as a minor element in Wodehouse's 1920 novel Jill the Reckless; it subsequently appears with more prominence across many Wodehouse stories and novels. The Drones Club makes its final appearance as a setting in 1972's Pearls, Girls and Monty Bodkin.

The name "Drones" has been used by several real-life clubs and restaurants.

== Overview ==
The Drones Club is in Mayfair, London, located in Dover Street, off Piccadilly. A drone being a male bee that does no work of its own and lives off the labour of others, it aptly describes the late 1920s to early 1930s stereotype of rich, idle young men, though some of the club members have jobs and even careers.

As decided by a vote of the club's members, the Drones Club tie is a striking "rich purple". A Drones Club scarf is also mentioned.

Wodehouse based the Drones Club on a combination of three real London clubs: the Bachelors' Club (which existed around the turn of the century), Buck's Club (established 1919), and a dash of the Bath Club for its swimming pool's ropes and rings. The fictional Drones barman, McGarry, has the same surname as the Buck's first bartender, a Mr McGarry (Buck's barman from 1919 to 1941, credited with creating the Buck's Fizz and Sidecar cocktails). However Evelyn Waugh declared that the Drones did not resemble any real club in 1920s London.

A real club has been based at 40 Dover Street since 1893, The Arts Club. Other gentlemen's clubs which have existed on Dover Street but are now dissolved include the Bath Club, the Junior Naval and Military Club, and the Scottish Club, as well as two mixed-sex clubs, the Albemarle Club and the Empress Club. None of these were considered among London's 'premier' clubs of the kind found on St James's Street and Pall Mall, and so their ambience often had something of the raucous informality of the fictional Drones Club.

About a dozen club members are major or secondary recurring characters in the Wodehouse stories. In addition to Bertie Wooster (Jeeves stories), Pongo Twistleton (Uncle Fred stories), Rupert Psmith (Psmith stories), and Freddie Threepwood (Blandings stories), prominent recurring drones include Bingo Little and Freddie Widgeon, plus Monty Bodkin, Barmy Fotheringay-Phipps, Tuppy Glossop, Catsmeat Potter-Pirbright, Archibald Mulliner, and the club millionaire Oofy Prosser.

== Events ==
- The Drones Club annual Golf tournament: A yearly golf handicap tournament that was held one year at Bingley-on-Sea.
- The Drones Club Squash Handicap: A yearly squash tournament. One year, Bertie Wooster was runner-up.
- The Drones Club Darts Tournament: An annual darts sweepstakes tournament held in February. Instead of taking part themselves, members purchase tickets for 10 shillings and each draw the name of one actual participant. The tournament is then held, and the member holding the name of the champion wins the jackpot.
- The Drones Club Fat Uncles Sweep: An annual sweepstakes contest introduced by Freddie Widgeon. Members enter their uncles in the contest and each draw the name of one uncle at random. Later, on the first day of the Eton v Harrow match, the members bring their uncles to the Drones Club for lunch. McGarry, having the uncanny ability to estimate the weight of anything to an ounce by sight, estimates the weight of each uncle and determines the fattest one. The member holding that name wins the jackpot, which exceeded £100 the first year the contest was run. A later rule change stipulates that £50 of the jackpot money is awarded to the nephew of the winning uncle.

== Stories ==
Among the Wodehouse works, what was later dubbed the "Drones Club series" is a loose set of separate stories told by various narrators about members of the Drones Club. Many of the stories are told at the club or have some events happening at the club.

Main canon

The main canon consists of 21 short stories (nine Bingo Little, eight Freddie Widgeon, and four other Drones, including the one introducing Pongo Twistleton and his Uncle Fred), as eventually collected in the omnibus:

- Tales from the Drones Club (1982) later The Drones Omnibus (1991)

The same set of short stories is also available in their original collections:

- Collected in Young Men in Spats (1936)
  - "Fate" (Freddie Widgeon)
  - "Tried in the Furnace" (Barmy Fotheringay-Phipps and Pongo Twistleton)
  - "Trouble Down at Tudsleigh" (Freddie Widgeon)
  - "The Amazing Hat Mystery" (Percy Wimbolt and Nelson Cork)
  - "Goodbye to All Cats" (Freddie Widgeon)
  - "The Luck of the Stiffhams" (Stiffy Stiffham)
  - "Noblesse Oblige" (Freddie Widgeon)
  - "Uncle Fred Flits By" (Pongo Twistleton with Uncle Fred)
- Collected in Lord Emsworth and Others (1937)
  - "The Masked Troubadour" (Freddie Widgeon)
- Collected in Eggs, Beans and Crumpets (1940)
  - "All's Well with Bingo" (Bingo Little)
  - "Bingo and the Peke Crisis" (Bingo Little)
  - "The Editor Regrets" (Bingo Little)
  - "Sonny Boy" (Bingo Little with Oofy Prosser)
- Collected in Nothing Serious (1950)
  - "The Shadow Passes" (Bingo Little)
  - "Bramley Is So Bracing" (Freddie Widgeon with Bingo Little)
- Collected in A Few Quick Ones (1959)
  - "The Fat of the Land" (Freddie Widgeon with Oofy Prosser)
  - "The Word in Season" (Bingo Little)
  - "Leave it to Algy" (Bingo Little with Oofy Prosser)
  - "Oofy, Freddie and the Beef Trust" (Freddie Widgeon with Oofy Prosser)
- Collected in Plum Pie (1966)
  - "Bingo Bans the Bomb" (Bingo Little with Freddie Widgeon)
  - "Stylish Stouts" (Bingo Little)
    - Neither Drones Club story collected in Plum Pie is narrated by a Crumpet.

Additional novels

Six novels about the adventures of Drones Club Members as main protagonist:

- Money for Nothing (1928) – novel about Hugo Carmody and Ronnie Fish
- The Luck of the Bodkins (1935) – novel about Monty Bodkin with Reggie Tennyson
- Laughing Gas (1936) – novel about Reginald Swithin
- Barmy in Wonderland (1952) – novel about Barmy Fotheringay-Phipps
- Ice in the Bedroom (1961) – novel about Freddie Widgeon with Oofy Prosser
- Pearls, Girls and Monty Bodkin (1972) – novel about Monty Bodkin

Related stories

Related are all stories about those Drones Club members already part of another series (Jeeves and Bertie, Blandings's Freddie Threepwood, Uncle Fred and Pongo, Psmith, Mr Mulliner's nephew Archibald Mulliner), but more especially:

- The Inimitable Jeeves (1923) – Jeeves semi-novel, Bertie and Bingo, some events at the club
- Leave it to Psmith (1923) – Psmith and Blandings novel, also Freddie Threepwood, some events at the club
- Collected in Mr Mulliner Speaking (1929)
  - "The Reverent Wooing of Archibald" (1928) – Archibald Mulliner and Algy Wymondham-Wymondham, starts at the club, told by Mr Mulliner
- Summer Lightning (1929) – Blandings novel with Hugo Carmody and Ronnie Fish
- Heavy Weather (1933) – Blandings novel with Hugo Carmody and Ronnie Fish, also Monty Bodkin, some events at the club
- Collected in Young Men in Spats (1936)
  - "Archibald and the Masses" (1935) – Archibald Mulliner, told by Mr Mulliner
  - "The Code of the Mulliners" (1935) – Archibald Mulliner, told by Mr Mulliner
- Uncle Fred in the Springtime (1939) – Uncle Fred and Blandings novel, action started by Pongo, Horace, and Oofy at the club
- Cocktail Time (1958) – Uncle Fred novel, some events with Pongo at the club
- "Life with Freddie" in Plum Pie (1966) – Freddie Threepwood, some events with the club's barman

Relatable story

Relatable is one story, which features the club and a Drone as a secondary character, and marks the first mention of the Drones Club:

- Jill the Reckless (1921) – novel, Drone Algy Martyn as secondary character, one chapter at the club

Many more stories simply include a Drones member in some scenes, or have mentions of club members.

Not included

Not included are all identical stories published under other titles (in magazines or U.S. versions), or "recycled" stories, especially:

- "Comrade Bingo" and "Bingo and the Little Woman" (Bingo Little) – 1922 magazine stories merged into the semi-novel The Inimitable Jeeves (1923)
- "Quest" (Freddie Widgeon) – 1931 magazine story rewritten as "The Knightly Quest of Mervyn" (Mr Mulliner, non-Drones story, still featuring Oofy Prosser)
- "The Ordeal of Bingo Little" (Bingo Little) – 1954 magazine story rewritten as "Leave It to Algy" (Bingo Little, included above)
- "Unpleasantness at Kozy Kot" (Drone Dudley "Biffy" Wix-Biffen) – 1958 "exclusive" story recycled for the U.S. edition of A Few Quick Ones (1959) from "Fixing it for Freddie" (Jeeves story)
- "The Great Fat Uncle Contest" (Bingo Little) – 1965 magazine rewrite of "Stylish Stouts" (Bingo Little, included above)

== Eggs, Beans, and Crumpets ==
Most of the Drones short stories are also "Eggs, Beans, and Crumpets stories". These stories feature unnamed club members, each referred to as an "Egg", "Bean", or "Crumpet". This is allegedly based on the habit they have of addressing each other as "old egg", "old bean", or "my dear old crumpet", though characters in the stories almost never address other characters by these nicknames. A few later stories introduce a fourth subset of Drones Club members known as "Piefaces".

Many of the Drones Club stories begin with these nondescript members talking about the latest exploits of Freddie Widgeon, Pongo Twistleton, Bingo Little, or another of their number. The story then transitions into a particularly well-informed Crumpet narrating the story as he tells it to an uninformed Egg or Bean:

"Beau Widgeon?" said the Egg, impressed. "What ho!" A Crumpet shook his head. "You won't catch Freddie joining any Foreign Legion, once he gets on to the fact that it means missing his morning cup of tea. [...]" (in "Noblesse Oblige")

"[...] I allude, of course, to the Bella Mae Jobson affair." The Bean asked what the Bella Mae Jobson affair was, and the Crumpet, expressing surprise that he had not heard of it, said that it was the affair of Bella Mae Jobson. (in "The Editor Regrets")

"He can't do that here," said an Egg, [...] "Hoy!" he went on, addressing the Crumpet, who had entered as he spoke. (in "The Word in Season")

"Eggs, Beans, and Crumpets stories" are always told by a Crumpet to an Egg and/or a Bean. There is no indication in the stories if the same Crumpet is always the narrator; each of the stories could theoretically be told by a different Crumpet.

Wodehouse had already used similar storytelling techniques in the tales told by Mr Mulliner, who refers to his anonymous interlocutors by the name of their drink, and in the stories narrated by The Oldest Member who is never named.

== Members ==
The total number of members is not established. At the Drones Club weekend in Le Touquet, France, were "about 87 members", and not all of them crossed the Channel (such as Pongo Twistleton and Horace Pendlebury-Davenport).

Confirmed Drones members include

- Samuel Galahad "Sam" Bagshott
- Charles Edward "Biffy" Biffen
- Montague "Monty" Bodkin
- Godfrey "Biscuit" Brent, Lord Biskerton
- "Tubby", Lord Bridgnorth
- Frederick "Freddie" Bullivant
- Hugo Carmody
- Freddie Chalk-Marshall
- G. D'Arcy "Stilton" Cheesewright
- Nelson Cork
- Dudley Finch
- Ronald Overbury "Ronnie" Fish
- George "Boko" Fittleworth
- Cyril "Barmy" Fotheringay-Phipps
- Hildebrand "Tuppy" Glossop
- Richard "Bingo" Little
- Algernon "Algy" Martyn
- Archibald "Archie" Mulliner

- Horace Pendlebury-Davenport
- Judson Phipps
- Tipton Plimsoll
- Claude Cattermole "Catsmeat" Potter-Pirbright
- Alexander "Oofy" Prosser
- Rupert "Psmith" Smith
- William "Bill" Belfry, 9th Earl of Rowcester
- Adolphus "Stiffy" Stiffham
- Reginald "Reggie" Tennyson
- Frederick "Freddie" Threepwood, likely leaves the Drones after moving to America
- Reginald "Pongo" Twistleton
- Hugo Walderwick
- Frederick "Freddie" Widgeon
- Percy Wimbolt
- Harold "Ginger" Winship
- Bertram "Bertie" Wooster
- Algernon "Algy" Wymondham-Wymondham
- Harold "Stinker" Pinker

Possible Drones members include

- "Chuffy", Lord Chuffnell
- Augustus "Gussie" Fink-Nottle

Club staff includes

- Bates (hall porter)
- McGarry (a barman)
- Robinson (a cloakroom waiter)

Virtual Drones members include

- "Eggs, Beans, and Crumpets" (unknown narrator(s) and various nondescript members)
- Dudley "Biffy" Wix-Biffen (exists only in a non-canon, recycled story)

== Real Drones Clubs ==
Some real "Drones" clubs or restaurants exist or have existed, including:

- The Drones Club, a private club in Point Judith, Rhode Island (USA), was established in the late 1930s.
- A "Drones" restaurant existed in the early 1970s in London at 1 Pont Street off Knightsbridge. Previously a burger-and-fries, in November 2000 it was turned into a gastronomic restaurant by new owner and restaurateur Marco Pierre White. This "Drones Club" moved to 12 St. George Street in Mayfair, and was purchased in 2004 by businessman Ben Goldsmith and turned into a members-only dining club. Membership included pop stars, peers, CEOs and princesses. This club closed in March 2007 due to losing its location to a restaurant.
- Another "Drones" restaurant, aka "Drones Fenwick of Bond Street", exists in London inside the Fenwick department store at 63 New Bond Street. It was linked to "The Drones Club" above.

== References, notes and sources ==
References and notes

Sources (members and stories)

- Hutchinson, Kyle (11 May 2006). "Wodehouse Places: Drones Club". The P. G. Wodehouse Story Index [database]. Archived from the original on 16 January 2009.
- Kuzmenko, Michel (The Russian Wodehouse Society) (22 March 2007). "Wodehouse books". Bibliography.
- Midkiff, Neil (The Wodehouse Society [US]) (31 March 2019). "The Wodehouse short stories". P. G. Wodehouse pages.
- Netherlands, The P. G. Wodehouse Society (1 March 2005). "Short Stories by P. G. Wodehouse". Bibliography. Archived from the original on 1 May 2007.
- Reggie (16 March 2007). "Wodehouse Gazetteer: Drones Club". Blandings, a Companion to the Works of P. G. Wodehouse. Archived from the original on 27 September 2007.
- Ring, Tony (The P. G. Wodehouse Society UK) (June 2000). "Wodehouse 'Series' Short Stories". Wodehouse Information Sheets. Archived from the original on 27 September 2007.
- Wodehouse, P. G. (2008) [1974]. Aunts Aren't Gentlemen (Reprinted ed.). Arrow Books. ISBN 978-0099513971.
