= Chas Grave =

Artist and cartoonist

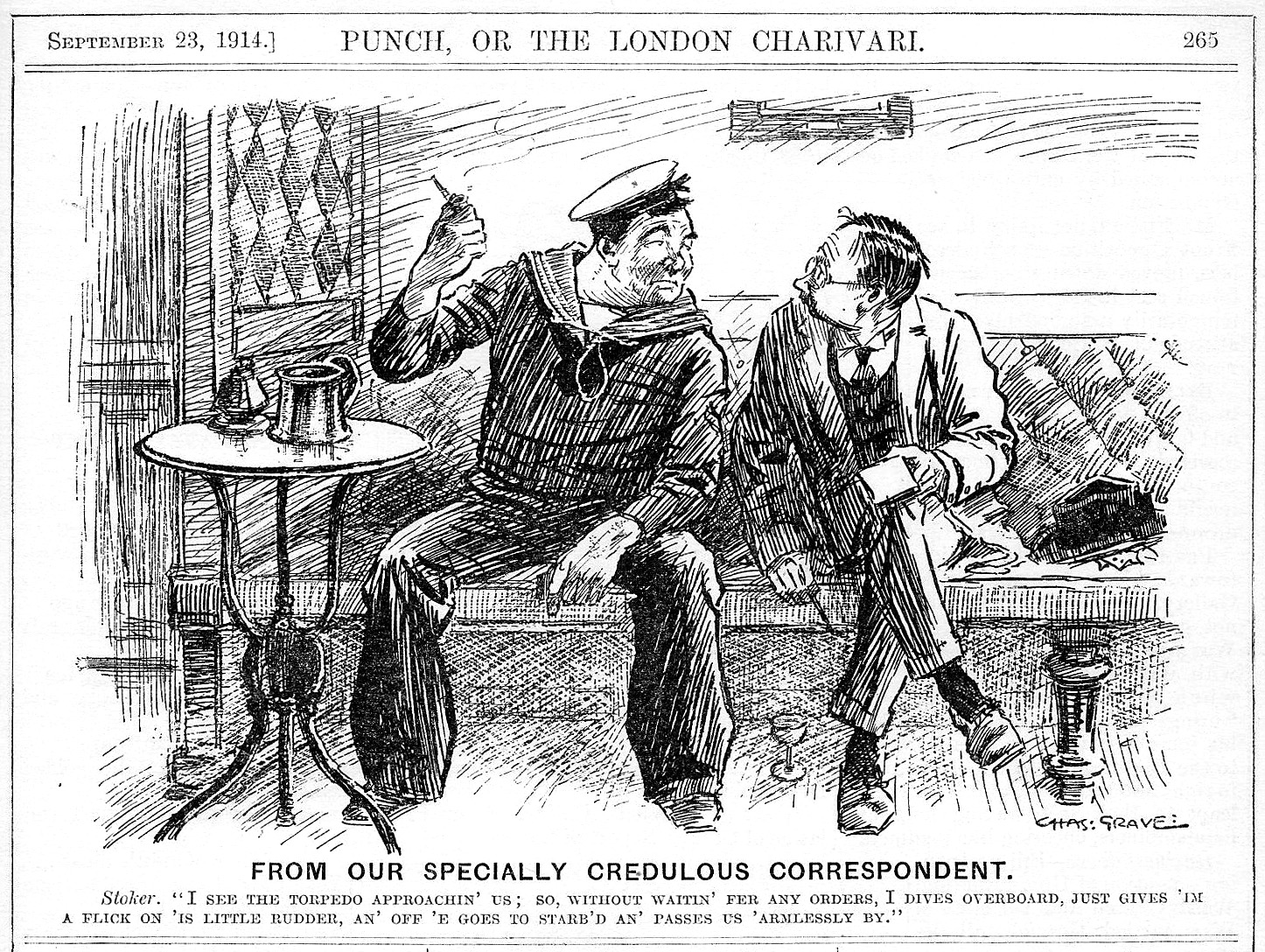

Charles Grave better known as Chas Grave (1886–1944) was an artist and cartoonist, working at various times for Punch Magazine, The Passing Show, Tatler and The Bystander. He concentrated on the marine world, portraying seafaring activities, including sailing, cruising and the lives of merchant seaman.

At this time Chas. Grave was drawing his cartoons of hairy-looking trawlermen and rough-looking tars. His was very much the small ship Navy. Perhaps his most famous cartoon was one of a rear-gunner in a trawler incredulously watching a smoking Heinkel pitching into the sea off the port bow and saying 'Did I do that?' The occasional cartoon had a somewhat dark humour. In April 1941, two fish were talking to each other, with horned mines in the fore- and background. One fish was saying 'My father says these things appear every twenty years'. Norman Mansbridge, who also served in the Navy, assumed Grave's mantle when he died in 1941, and it is interesting to see how many of the post-war Punch contributors began in those wartime days. Brockbank, for instance, made his debut in February 1942 with a drawing of an irate little man in flying kit watching a Hurricane being catapulted off the front end of a merchantman and saying "Don't mind me, I'm only the pilot"

— Naval Review, January 1974
