= Poinsettia (disambiguation) =

Poinsettia, Euphorbia pulcherrima, is a commercially important plant species of the diverse spurge family.

Poinsettia also may refer to:

- Euphorbia subg. Poinsettia, a subgenus of flowering plants
- Poinsettia (cocktail), a mixture of champagne, Cointreau, and cranberry juice
- Poinsettia Bowl, a college football bowl game established in 2005 in San Diego, California
- Poinsettia Bowl (1952–1955), a defunct bowl game that was played between military teams in San Diego, California
