= Simeon Braguin =

American artist & illustrator (1907–1997)

- Born: 1907; Kharkov, Ukraine
- Died: 1997 (aged 89–90)
- Occupations: Artist; illustrator; painter; creative director
- Known for: Member of the New York School; abstract expressionism; illustrator and Creative Director at Vogue
- Notable work: Abstract expressionist paintings; commercial illustration for Vogue
- Spouse: Janet Chatfield Taylor (d. 1983)

Simeon Braguin (1907–1997) was an American artist and illustrator who enjoyed success as both a commercial illustrator and painter. Commercially, he was long associated with Vogue magazine. As an artist he is considered part of the New York School and the abstract expressionist movement.

== Early life ==
Braguin was born in the Karkov, Ukraine in 1907 and emigrated to the United States in 1917 with the outbreak of the Russian Revolution. He studied art at the Art Students League under Boardman Robinson, where he became close with fellow student, Lenna Glackens and ultimately her father, artist William Glackens.

== Commercial career and World War Two service ==
In the early 1930s, Braguin began to see commercial success, first as an illustrator, then ultimately as a painter. In 1932, Braguin joined Vogue magazine, as an illustrator. He eventually would become Creative Director. During his tenure he worked extensively with photographers Cecil Beaton and Edward Steichen. During the Second World War, Braguin joined the OSS as a photographer, serving in Italy, Austria, and Yugoslavia, and retired a decorated veteran. Returning from the war, Braguin rejoined Vogue, again as Creative Director, where he remained for many years. During this period, he repeatedly commissioned illustrations from the then unknown Andy Warhol.

In 1947 Braguin left Vogue for the advertising firm of Spadea, Inc.

== Success as a painter ==
As early as the 1930s, Braguin began exhibiting both in both solo and joint exhibitions. For the last several decades of his life, he intentionally painted in isolation in Essex, Connecticut. His solo show at the Yale art Gallery in 1991 was Braquin's re-introduction to the art world.

=== Notable exhibitions ===
- (1931) Marie Harriman Gallery; New York, NY; solo exhibition
- (1931) Art Students League; New York, NY; group exhibition
- (1932) New School for Social Research; New York, NY; group exhibition
- (1933) Marie Harriman Gallery; New York, NY; solo exhibition
- (1936) Seligmann Galleries; New York, NY; group show of successful artists with successful advertising careers
- (1971) Poindexter Gallery; New York, NY; solo exhibition
- (1975) Poindexter Gallery New York, NY; solo exhibition
- (1991) Yale University Art Gallery; New Haven, CT; solo exhibition
- (2010) Wally Findlay Galleries; New York, NY; posthumous solo exhibition

== Personal life ==
Braguin was married twice. His first marriage, to the daughter of a Wall Street financier ended in divorce. His second wife, Janet Chatfield Taylor, was a fashion editor at Vogue. They remained married until her death in 1983. When Braguin died in 1997, he left an estate of $8 million to the Yale University Art Gallery to establish the Janet and Simeon Braguin Fund for American Art. The terms of the gift stipulated that income from the trust would be used to acquire work from living American artists.
