= Capitol Cider =

Cider house in Seattle, Washington, U.S.

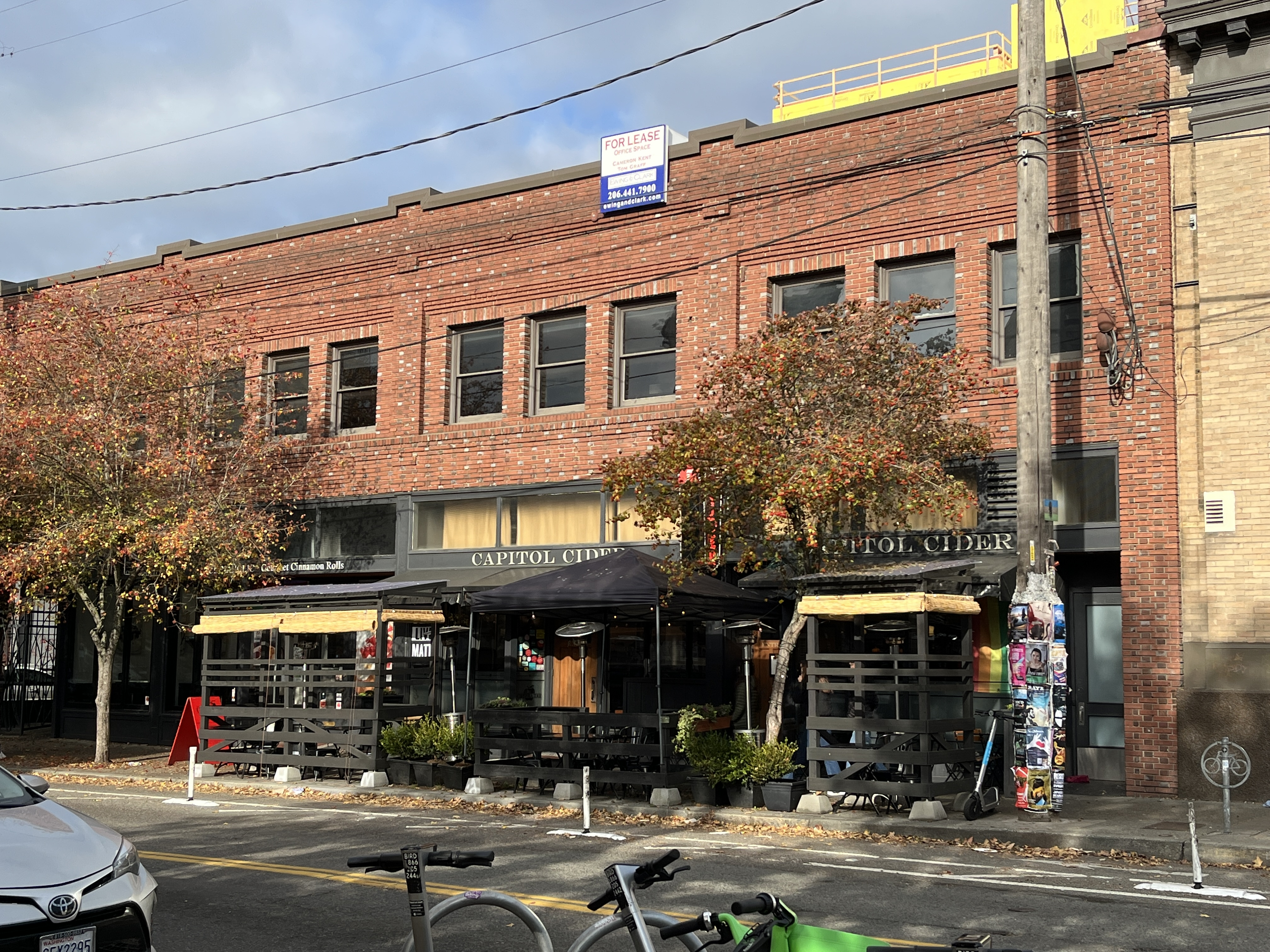
- The cider house's exterior, 2022
- Interactive map of Capitol Cider

Restaurant information
- Location: 818 E Pike Street, Seattle, King, Washington, 98122, United States
- Coordinates: 47.6142°N 122.3211°W
- Website: capitolcider.com

Capitol Cider is a cider house and restaurant in Seattle, in the U.S. state of Washington.

== Description ==
According to Thrillist, Capitol Cider is "Seattle's first cider bar (and the country's second)". Located on Capitol Hill, the cider house has a gluten-free menu and approximately 150 ciders. Food options have included steak, pork chops, burgers, fish and chips, gnocchi, Seattle-style hot dogs, cider-battered cod with French fries, and vegetables.

The brunch menu has included short rib hash, banana bread French toast, and cider mimosas. In addition to cider, the restaurant has served beer, cocktails, mead, and wine.

Capitol Cider's interior features couches, a fireplace, shuffleboard, and a bookcase stocked with board games. Lonely Planet has said, "The best cider pub in Seattle is far more than a taproom for apple-infused alcoholic beverages – although the 20-item cider menu is, of course, a big bonus. There's decent food, live music, game nights, craft beer, cocktails and a wonderful 'pub' feel set off by its cozy booths and portrait-bedecked walls."

== History ==
Owners Spencer Reilly and Julie Tall took opened the bar in June 2013. Capitol Cider had "the largest selection of cider on tap" in the United States, as of 2013. The business hosted a Seattle Seahawks viewing party in 2015.

Erik Jackson has been a chef at the restaurant.

== Reception ==
In 2013, Eater Seattle called Capitol Cider "a perfect hang out". Dylan Joffe, Maggy Lehmicke, and Sabra Boyd included Capitol Cider in Eater Seattle's 2022 overview of "where to eat fantastic gluten-free food in Seattle".

In 2017, Aimee Rizzo of The Infatuation wrote, "If you think cider houses are dumb, then you clearly haven’t been to Capitol Cider. It feels like being 16 and hanging out with your friends in your basement playing board games, but without any mildew smells, and with alcohol you obtained legally... If you're lucky enough to get a table, break out the Cards Against Humanity and grab a pint of something semi-dry if you're into the classics, or a funky apple mead if you're feeling like a medieval court jester (or just adventurous)." She also included Capitol Cider in a 2022 list of "The 18 Best Bars in Seattle".
