= Louis Kaye =

Australian writer (1901–1981)

Louis Kaye was the pseudonym of Noel Wilson Norman (14 July 1901 – 19 April 1981), an Australian novelist and short story writer. He also published short stories under the names Grant Doyle Cooper and James Linnel.

He was born in Claremont, Tasmania to a well-connected Lindisfarne family but was more interested in an adventurous outback life than one of business and politics. From 1917 he was to make frequent forays into the Western Australian bush to experience first-hand life in the bush and deserts of outback Australia. His experience of aboriginal life was augmented by reading the works of anthropologist Baldwin Spencer.

He was already a successful contributor of short stories to overseas magazines in 1931 when he wrote his first novel, Tybal Men, set in a WA sheep station. He is regarded as giving a realistic depiction of bush life and aboriginal culture, though criticised for emulating the "violent excesses of the American cowboy novel".

His brother Don (Donald Manners Thirkell) Norman (24 April 1909 – 10 March 2001) was a writer (e.g. Errol Flynn : the Tasmanian story W.N. Hurst and E.L. Metcalf, Hobart c1981 ISBN 0-9594146-0-6) and historian.

== Short stories ==
A partial list of Kaye's short stories includes:

- Off the Trail in Everybody's Magazine May 1927
- The Gold Carriers in Everybody's Magazine Nov 1927
- The Tracks of Sonya in The Passing Show Oct 1 1932
- The Lee Rail in The Australian Journal May 1937
- Widow’s Cruise in The Passing Show Sep 25 1937
- Well - Let’s Laugh! in The Passing Show Jan 22 1938
- Strange Ones in The Passing Show Feb 19 1938
- Boomerang in London Evening News Jul 28 1938
- Old Man Kangaroo in Adventure Jun 1940
- Walk to Glory in The Saturday Evening Post Nov 2 1940
- Desert Gold in Blue Book Jan 1941
- The Brumby Car in Collier's Feb 20 1943
- Kangaroo Rifle in Blue Book May 1945
- Mark of Brotherhood in Blue Book Aug 1945
- Back Country Boy in Blue Book Apr 1948
- By the Last Fires in Short Stories May 1950
- The Necklet in Short Stories Oct 1950
- The Storm Strip in Blue Book Feb 1951

== Novels ==
- Tybal Men pub. Wright & Brown, London 1931

also as Tybal Men – A Struggle For Survival in the Outback Angus and Robertson, Sydney 1988 ISBN 0-207-14813-9

- Trail of Plunder pub. Wright & Brown, London 1931
- Desert Herbage pub. Wright & Brown, London 1932
- The End of the Trail pub. Wright & Brown, London 1933
- The Desert Boss pub. Wright & Brown, London 1934
- Tightened Belts pub. Wright & Brown, London 1934
- Pathways of Free Men pub. Wright & Brown, London 1935
- The Dark Gods pub. Wright & Brown, London 1935
- The Lonely Land pub. Wright & Brown, London 1935
- Black Wilderness pub. Wright & Brown, London 1936
- Darkened Camps London : Wright & Brown, 1936
- Vanished Legion pub. Wright & Brown, London 1937
- Tracks of Levask pub. Wright & Brown, London 1938

== Sources ==
- Oxford Companion to Australian Literature ed. W H Wilde, Joy Hooton, Barry Andrews, Oxford University Press 1994
- The Bibliography of Australian Literature John Arnold, John Hay University of Queensland Press

== See also ==
- Australian outback literature of the 20th century
