= The Luck of the Bodkins =

1935 novel by P. G. Wodehouse

- First edition (UK)
- Author: P. G. Wodehouse
- Language: English
- Genre: Comic novel
- Publisher: Herbert Jenkins (UK); Little, Brown and Company (US)
- Publication date: 11 October 1935 (UK); 3 January 1936 (US)
- Publication place: United Kingdom
- Media type: Print

The Luck of the Bodkins is a novel by P. G. Wodehouse, first published in the United Kingdom on 11 October 1935 by Herbert Jenkins, and in the United States on 3 January 1936 by Little, Brown and Company. The two editions are significantly different, though the plot remains the same. The novel was serialised in The Passing Show magazine (UK) from 21 September to 23 November 1935, and this version was published as the UK edition. For its US magazine appearance, in the Red Book between August 1935 and January 1936, Wodehouse re-wrote the story, reducing its length, and this became the US book edition.

The story concerns the complicated love life of amiable young Monty Bodkin, the nephew of Sir Gregory Parsloe-Parsloe, who had previously appeared in Heavy Weather (1933) employed as the latest in the long line of Lord Emsworth's secretaries.

The plot of The Luck of the Bodkins continues in Pearls, Girls and Monty Bodkin (published 37 years later in 1972).

== Plot ==
The story takes place on an ocean liner, the RMS Atlantic, en route to New York. Monty Bodkin hopes to win back his fiancée Gertrude Butterwick, an England international hockey player travelling to a tournament, who has just ended their engagement without explanation. Their fellow-travellers include Gertrude's cousin Ambrose Tennyson who has accepted a job as a writer for the Superba-Llewellyn film corporation, and Ambrose's younger brother Reggie Tennyson who is being forced by his family to take up an office job in Canada. Also on board are Ambrose's fiancée, Lottie Blossom (a film actress for the Superba-Llewellyn), as well as the movie mogul Ivor Llewellyn (the corporation's president) and Llewellyn's sister-in-law Mabel Spence. Numerous comic misunderstandings occur throughout the novel, many inadvertently due to the well-intentioned ship's steward Albert Peasemarch.

Mabel informs Llewellyn that his wife Grayce, currently in Paris, has sent a message telling him that he is to smuggle her new pearl necklace through US customs to avoid paying duty. Too afraid of his wife to refuse, Llewellyn frets about the risks for several days, his concern heightened by the erroneous belief that Monty is a spy working for the customs authorities. He tries to bribe Monty by offering him an acting job, but Monty hates acting and refuses.

Gertrude explains that she broke off her engagement after seeing a photograph of Monty in swimming costume, believing his "Sue" chest tattoo to be recent. After Monty explains that he unwisely got the tattoo more than three years ago during a previous brief entanglement, Gertrude renews the engagement. Monty buys Gertrude a Mickey Mouse toy which opens to reveal chocolates inside. She develops an intense romantic attachment to it.

Llewellyn had hired Ambrose Tennyson as a writer under the mistaken belief that he was the famous poet Alfred, Lord Tennyson. When he is told of his error he immediately fires Ambrose. Now lacking a job, Ambrose no longer feels able to marry Lottie as he does not want to rely on her money. Lottie is desperate and takes Gertrude's Mickey Mouse, threatening to tell Gertrude that Monty gave it to her if Monty does not accept Llewellyn's offer and insist that Ambrose be re-hired. Gertrude, growing increasingly suspicious of Monty's relationship with Lottie, calls off the engagement again. Ambrose convinces Lottie to return the toy to Monty, though Monty believes that he has lost Gertrude for good anyway.

Reggie and Mabel have grown close during the voyage, and become engaged. Reggie decides to ignore the Canadian office job, and to go with Mabel to California. However, like his brother he is unwilling to rely on his fiancée's money, and he needs a job. Llewellyn agrees to hire Reggie in return for him smuggling the necklace through customs.

On arrival in New York, everyone makes it past customs. Reggie privately tells Llewellyn he had hidden the necklace in the Mickey Mouse, but Monty (despite not knowing what it contains) is unwilling to hand it over. Llewellyn agrees to give jobs to both Monty and Ambrose in return for the toy. With Mabel's help, contracts are signed and Llewellyn grabs the toy and leaves.

Lottie confesses to Gertrude her attempted blackmail of Monty, and explains that she never had any romantic interest in him, being engaged herself. Gertrude reconciles with Monty once more. Both Monty and Ambrose now have jobs and are free to resume their respective engagements.

The steward Peasemarch comes to see Monty and explains that he had found and confiscated the necklace, and the Mickey Mouse is actually empty. However, Peasemarch had held onto the necklace as he did not want Monty to get in trouble, and he reveals that he brought it through customs himself, in his pocket. Monty is delighted to learn from Lottie that prohibition has been repealed, and calls his hotel's room service to order champagne.

== Characters ==
- Montague "Monty" Bodkin – Wealthy 28-year-old Drones Club member, engaged to Gertrude
- Gertrude Butterwick – Member of the All English Ladies' Hockey Team, engaged to Monty, cousin of Ambrose and Reggie
- Ivor Llewellyn – President of the Superba-Llewellyn Motion Picture Corporation
- Mabel Spence – Llewellyn's sister-in-law; falls in love with Reggie
- Reginald "Reggie" Tennyson – Drones Club member, Ambrose's younger brother, Gertrude's cousin, Monty's friend, and Mabel's suitor
- Lotus "Lottie" Blossom – Movie star, engaged to Ambrose
- Ambrose Tennyson – Reggie's brother and Gertrude's cousin, engaged to Lottie
- Albert Eustace Peasemarch – Steward on board the RMS Atlantic.

== Style ==
A comic effect is created by the incongruous combination of formal and informal language in Wodehouse's narrative passages, as in the beginning of the novel: "Into the face of the young man who sat on the terrace of the Hotel Magnifique at Cannes there had crept a look of furtive shame, the shifty, hangdog look which announces that an Englishman is about to talk French." Before the first comma, the passage may be the beginning of a serious novel, but the sudden use of two colloquial words, "shifty" and "hangdog", prepares the reader for the semantic incongruity of the last part of the sentence.

The garrulous steward Albert Peasemarch combines a colloquial, informal manner of speaking with long, formal words, such as when he discovers highly "copperising" inscriptions on the wall written in "undeliable" lipstick. Peasemarch uses malapropisms, such as when he says philosophically, "what helpless prawns [pawns] we are in the clutches of a remorseless fate" (ch. 18), and also mis-stresses words, as when he says "intricket" (meaning intricate). Similarly, Peasemarch makes several attempts to use French phrases. For example, he says "see jewness savvay" (si jeunesse savait) and "fam fatarl" (femme fatale).

== Publication history ==
The illustration on the first UK edition dust jacket was by "Abbey", and the illustration on the first US edition was by Alan Foster. The Luck of the Bodkins was published with illustrations by "Illingworth" in The Passing Show magazine (UK). Alan Foster illustrated the story in Red Book (US).

Wodehouse's earlier 1922 novel The Girl on the Boat also involves a journey on the RMS Atlantic, going from New York to Southampton.

== Reception ==
Wodehouse biographer Richard Usborne asserts that this book is "one of the best" in the Wodehouse canon.

== Adaptations ==
The story was adapted for radio in 2000 by Patricia Hooker, with Nicholas Boulton as Monty Bodkin, Jonathan Firth as Reggie, Eleanor Tremain as Gertrude, Lorelei King as Lottie, Peter Woodthorpe as Peasemarch, John Guerrasio as Ivor Llewellyn, Barbara Barnes as Mabel, and Ian Masters as Ambrose. The adaptation was directed by Gordon House and first aired on BBC Radio 4 on 17 June 2000.
