= Australian outback literature of the 20th century =

Overview of 20th century Australian outback literature

Many poets and novelists and specialised writers (missionaries, anthropologists, historians etc.) have written about the Australian outback from first-hand experience. These works frequently address race relations in Australia, often from a personal point of view, with Australian Aboriginal people used as a theme or subject.

In the first part of the 20th century, much of Australia was still being explored by white Australians and their encounters with Aborigines who had had little or no contact or knowledge of the settlers were still taking place well after World War II.

== First contact ==
There has been some little attempt on the part of European writers to speak up on behalf of the Aborigines. One writer in particular, Western Australian Donald Stuart, has made the effort. Contact between Indigenous Australian and settlers and the early experience of native tribesmen and women with the new arrivals involved challenges. Another writer who looked at this period is Brian Penton, whose novel Landtakers recounts a disastrous meeting between Indigenous Australian tribespeople and European settlers.

- Penton, Brian (1935). Landtakers. Melbourne: Cassell and Co. Ltd.
- Stuart, Donald (1971). Ilbarana. Georgian House, Melbourne.
- Stuart, Donald (1976). Malloonkai. Georgian House, Melbourne.

== 1900–1930 ==
The 20th century saw the opening up of northern and western Australia, as well as the far reaches of the established colonies of New South Wales, South Australia and Queensland, and in 1901, the Federation of Australia took place. Outback Australia was still very much accessible only by horse and camel, with the latter faring far better than the former. Yet cattle and sheep were being driven north (and back south to market) in ever increasing numbers, leading to the establishment of the legendary stations of the outback, some of them to be described as "bigger than Texas." In this period, Aborigines came to work on cattle stations in greater and greater numbers. Indigenous Australians were good horsemen and they worked as house servants. Indeed, a recurring theme running through much outback literature of the period is that, "the land could never have been opened up by Europeans without the help of the Aborigines."

Writers referring to this period are necessarily more numerous, and include Mary Durack, Charles Duguid, A. M. Duncan-Kemp, William Hatfield, Tom Cole, Margaret Ford, Michael Terry, Alfred Searcy, R. G. Kimber, Gordon Buchanan, K. Langford Smith, Louis Kaye and Ion Idriess.

- Buchanan, Gordon (1933). Packhorse & Waterhole. Angus & Robertson, Sydney.
- Cole, Tom (1990). Hell West and Crooked. Angus & Robertson, Sydney.
- Duncan-Kemp, A. M. (1961). Our Channel Country. Angus & Robertson, Melbourne.
- Duguid, Charles (1963). No Dying Race. Rigby limited, Melbourne.
- Durack, Mary (1959). Kings in Grass Castles. Constable & Company, London.
- Ford, Margaret (1966). Beyond the Furthest Fences. Hodder and Stoughton, Sydney.
- Gunn, Mrs. Aeneas (1991). We of the Never-Never. Arrow, Milsons Point, N.S.W.
- Hatfield, William (1933). Desert Saga. Angus & Robertson, Sydney.
- Idriess, Ion L. (1931). Lasseter's Last Ride. Angus & Robertson, Sydney.
- Kaye, Louis (1931). Tybal Men. Angus & Robertson, Sydney.
- Kimber, R. G. (1986). Man from Arltunga: Walter Smith, Australian Bushman. Hesperion Press, Carlisle, Western Australia.
- Langford Smith, K. (1935). Sky Pilot in Arnhem Land. Angus & Robertson, Sydney.
- Searcy, Alfred (1912). By Flood and Field. G. Bell & Sons, London.
- Terry, Michael (1925). Across Unknown Australia. Herbert Jenkins, London.

== 1931–1945 ==
In this period, motor transportation was slowly making an impact and the main thing holding it back by the end of the period was the lack of well-made roads. In a sense, these years marked the last real period of exploration by white Australians of areas where Indigenous Australians lived. Many an expedition into the dry lands of Central Australia in particular, was still carried out by camel. This is true of anthropologists like Charles P. Mountford, journalists like Ernestine Hill, patrol officers like Vic Hall, doctors like Clyde Fenton, scientists like Cecil Madigan, writers like Frank Clune and Xavier Herbert, missionaries like Wilbur S. Chaseling, and others like Arthur Groom and Carl Warburton.

- Chaseling, Wilbur S. (1957). Yulengor, Nomads of Arnhem Land. The Epworth Press, London.
- Clune, Frank (1944). The Red Heart. Hawthorn Press, Melbourne.
- Fenton, Clyde (1947). Flying Doctor. Georgian House, Melbourne.
- Groom, Arthur (1950). I Saw a Strange Land. Angus & Robertson, Sydney.
- Hall, Victor C. (1947). Bad Medecine. Robertson & Mullens, Melbourne.
- Herbert, Xavier (1975). Poor Fellow My Country. Collins, Sydney.
- Hill, Ernestine (1943). The Great Australian Loneliness. Robertson & Mullens, Melbourne.
- Madigan, Cecil (1944). Central Australia. Oxford University Press, Melbourne.
- Mountford, Charles Pearcy (1948). Brown Men and Red Sand. Robertson & Mullens, Melbourne.
- Warburton, Carl (1944). Buffaloes. Australian Pocket Library, Sydney.

== 1945–1960 ==
The post-war period saw vastly increased development of white settlements throughout the outback. The war itself had created a need for an efficient north-south axis route for troop movements, and this led to a temporary increase in the number of people living in these remote areas. Writers of this period include W. E. Harney, Colin Simpson, Joe Walker, Syd Kyle-Little, Patsy Adam-Smith, Max Brown, Sidney Downer and George Farwell.

- Adam-Smith, Patsy (1971). No Tribesman. Rigby, Adelaide.
- Brown, Max (1966). The Jimberi Track. Australasian Book Society Australia, Sydney.
- Downer, Sidney (1963). Patrol Indefinite. Angus & Robertson, Sydney.
- Farwell, George (1962). Cape York to the Kimberleys. Rigby, Adelaide.
- Harney, W. E. (1957). Life Among the Aborigines. Hutchinson, London.
- Kyle-Little, Syd (1957). Whispering Wind. Robert Hale & Co., London.
- Lockwood, Douglas (1964). The Fringe Dwellers. Cassell, Melbourne.
- Simpson, Colin (1951). Adam in Ochre. Angus & Robertson, Sydney.
- Sullivan, Jack (1992). It's Still There: A Factual Collection of Bush Yarns.
- Walker, Joe (1960). No Sunlight Singing. Hutchinson, London.

== 1961–2010s ==
Even in the 1960s, there remained some Aboriginal tribespeople who had little or no contact with Europeans. Writers include Hugh Atkinson, Keith Cole, Richard A. Gould, Xavier Herbert and Winifred Hilliard.

- Atkinson, Hugh (1982). Billy Two-Toes' Rainbow. Nelson, Melbourne.
- Cole, Keith (1969). The Aborigines of Arnhem Land. Charles Scribner's & Sons, New York.
- Gould, Richard A. (1969). Yiwarra, Foragers of the Australian Desert. Charles Scribner's & Sons, New York.
- Herbert, Xavier (1975). Poor Fellow My Country. Collins, Fontana Books, Sydney.
- Hilliard, Winifred M. (1968). The People in Between. Funk & Wagnalls, New York.
- King Boyles, Margaret (1977). Patterns of Aboriginal Culture – Then & Now. McGraw Hill.
- Middleton, Hannah (1977). But Now We Want The Land Back. New Era Publishers.
- Peasley, W. J. (1983). The Last of the Nomads. Fremantle Arts Centre Press.

== See also ==
- Indigenous Australian literature
