= Pearls, Girls and Monty Bodkin =

1972 novel by P. G. Wodehouse

- First edition (UK)
- Author: P. G. Wodehouse
- Language: English
- Genre: Comic novel
- Publisher: Barrie & Jenkins (UK); Simon & Schuster (US)
- Publication date: 12 October 1972 (UK); 6 August 1973 (US)
- Publication place: United Kingdom
- Media type: Print

Pearls, Girls and Monty Bodkin is a comic novel by P. G. Wodehouse, first published in the United Kingdom on 12 October 1972 by Barrie & Jenkins, and in the United States on 6 August 1973 by Simon & Schuster, Inc. under the title The Plot That Thickened. Although written towards the end of the Wodehouse's life, and published 37 years after The Luck of the Bodkins (1935), the events of the book follow on directly from those recounted in the earlier novel.

Monty Bodkin returns from Hollywood, with his romantic situation, previously recounted in Heavy Weather (1933) and The Luck of the Bodkins (1935), still as complicated as ever. Other recurring Wodehouse characters also appear, including the film studio president Ivor Llewellyn, the crook Alexander "Chimp" Twist, and Chimp's rivals Soapy and Dolly Molloy. Llewellyn was to return a year later in Bachelors Anonymous (1973).

== Plot ==
Monty Bodkin's fiancée Gertrude Butterwick refuses to marry without the consent of her father J. B. Butterwick. He dislikes Monty and will not agree to the match unless Monty can remain gainfully employed for a full year. Having spent a year working as a production advisor for the Superba-Llewellyn Motion Picture Corporation in Hollywood, Monty now returns to England. However, Butterwick insists that the job did not count because Monty got it (in The Luck of the Bodkins) through dishonest means.

To appease Butterwick, Monty seeks another paid position. Sally Miller (secretly in love with Monty) falsely tells her employer Grayce Llewellyn that Monty comes from an aristocratic family, and Grayce appoints Monty as secretary to her husband, Ivor Llewellyn, who is now in England. Monty is to work at the Llewellyns' newly rented country house, Mellingham Hall in Sussex, where Llewellyn is writing a history of his film studio.

The domineering Grayce watches Llewellyn's spending closely to prevent him from gambling. He had previously acquired secret funds by selling Grayce's valuable pearl necklace without her knowledge and replacing it with a fake. Now he obtains more by borrowing from Monty.

While Grayce is away, Llewellyn goes to an illegal nightclub with Monty and Sally. When the club is raided by the police, Sally helps the party to escape by pulling a dustbin over the head of a plainclothes policeman, Wilfred Chisholm. This valiant action causes Monty to fall in love with Sally. Unknown to them, Chisholm has over the past year become attracted to Gertrude, and would like to marry her. Although attracted to him, she feels she cannot break her engagement with Monty.

Grayce is worried about the security of her valuable necklace, and employs a private detective, J. Sheringham Adair, to watch over it. He agrees to come to the house posing as Llewellyn's new valet. Unknown to Grayce, Adair is an alias of Chimp Twist, a crook. Also visiting the house are the Llewellyns' new acquaintances Soapy and Dolly Molloy, who are actually professional criminals. Grayce's daughter Mavis plans to visit, bringing her new fiancé Jimmy Ponder. This worries Llewellyn, as Ponder is a jewellery expert who will realize that Grayce's necklace is not genuine.

When Monty is mistaken for a burglar, Grayce decides to lodge the pearls at a local bank for safekeeping. To avoid the necklace being exposed as a fake, Llewellyn asks Monty to drive it to the bank, and to pretend that it had been stolen on the way by an unknown robber. Monty agrees to the deception. As Monty is leaving, Dolly asks him for a lift into town and as they near their destination she takes him by surprise, pulling a gun and demanding the necklace. Both are then surprised by Chimp, who has been hiding in the back seat of the car, and who also has a gun. Chimp takes the necklace and drives off, leaving Monty and Dolly to walk back to the Hall. Monty tells Dolly that the necklace is fake, a fact which Chimp will soon discover.

Butterwick is still trying to prevent Monty marrying his daughter. Learning that Grayce had hired Monty only because of his supposed aristocratic connections, he sets her straight, hoping that she will sack Monty. Meanwhile, Chisholm tells Gertrude of Monty's nightclub escapade, and that he had been visiting the club in the company of a girl.

Monty receives a telegram from Gertrude to announce that she is breaking off the engagement. This allows Monty to become engaged to Sally, and Gertrude to become engaged to Chisholm. Grayce announces her intention to get a divorce, an event which Llewellyn – who has already been divorced four times – regards as purely routine.

== Characters ==
- Montrose "Monty" Bodkin – Amiable and rich Drone engaged to Gertrude, employed as a production advisor and then secretary to Ivor Llewellyn
- Alexandra "Sally" Miller – Secretary to Monty in Hollywood and later to Grayce Llewellyn in Sussex; in love with Monty
- Gertrude Butterwick – Monty's fiancée
- J. B. Butterwick – Gertrude's father; an import and export merchant
- Ivor Llewellyn – President of the Superba-Llewellyn Motion Picture Corporation, married to Grayce
- Grayce Llewellyn – Formidable fifth wife of Ivor Llewellyn
- Mavis Mulligan – Daughter of Grayce and step-daughter of Ivor Llewellyn; engaged to Jimmy Ponder
- James "Jimmy" Ponder – Partner in a jewellery firm; engaged to Mavis
- Alexander "Chimp" Twist — Crook operating as a private investigator under the alias J. Sheringham Adair
- Dora "Dolly" Molloy — Skilled thief, married to Soapy
- Thomas "Soapy" Molloy — Crook who sells worthless oil stock
- Wilfred "Cheeser" Chisholm – Plainclothes policeman; loves Gertrude

== Publication history ==
A working title for the book was "The Honor of the Bodkins".

Wodehouse dedicated the UK edition of the novel to his granddaughter Sheran Cazalet: "To Sheran with love". The front panel of the first UK edition dust jacket was illustrated by Osbert Lancaster. The front panel illustration of the first US edition dust jacket was drawn by Paul Bacon, and there is a black and white photograph of Wodehouse by Jill Krementz on the back panel.

A shortened version of the novel was published in the Star Weekly (Toronto, Canada) on 28 April 1973, with illustrations by Doug Fenton.
