= Joe Walker (novelist) =

Australian writer

- Born: 23 September 1910; Harewood, Yorkshire, England
- Died: 19 January 1971 (aged 60)
- Occupations: Novelist, newspaper editor

Joe Walker (23 September 1910 – 19 January 1971) was an Australian novelist, newspaper editor and union leader.

== Early career ==
Joseph Walker was born in Harewood, Yorkshire, England. He emigrated to Australia in 1928, and spent the Depression years in rural Australia, ending in Darwin, Northern Territory at the start of World War II.

== The war years ==
Joe Walker, known as 'Yorky' because of his accent, worked on the Darwin wharves and became chairman of the waterside section of the North Australian Workers' Union (NAWU) and from November 1943 to October 1947, he was NAWU secretary. On 19 February 1942, the Bombing of Darwin by the Japanese took place. Walker survived the attack, and attempted to remain in Darwin as an active union organizer, even though the city was under military control. He was eventually enrolled in the Civil Constructional Corps and spent the rest of this war in this organisation which was under semi-military control.

== Post-war years ==
He edited the weekly union newspaper, The Northern Standard when it resumed publication after the war. It was the Northern Territory's only newspaper at that time. After the war, Aboriginal workers in the Northern Territory began demanding rights taken for granted by other workers, such as the right to money wages. A February 1947 strike by Aboriginal workers in Darwin was supported by the NAWU. During the public debate over this issue, Joe Walker circulated accounts, based on reports from union organisers, of savage mistreatment of Aborigines on cattle stations, similar to some of the brutality he would later depict in his novel, No Sunlight Singing.

== Writing career ==
Joe Walker had had first-hand experience of life on outback cattle stations (notably with Vestey's) and had been deeply affected by what he saw as the ignoble treatment of the aborigines they employed. His novel No Sunlight Singing, written after he left the Territory and was living in Melbourne, Victoria, was an attempt to draw attention to the plight of this people, whom he saw as being exploited by station owners, who were themselves often absentee landlords.

== Works ==
- Walker, Joe (1960). No Sunlight Singing. Hutchinson, London.
- Walker, Joe (1963). Y' Can't Win. unpublished.

== Last days ==
Although Joe Walker did not play a leading role in any political organisation during the 1960s, he joined in many of the campaigns of the period, including the protests against the hanging of Ronald Ryan (the last person executed in Australia) in 1967, the gaoling of union leader Clarrie O'Shea in 1969 and the struggles over the Vietnam War and conscription, from the mid-1960s onwards. Joe Walker died in Melbourne in 1971.

== See also ==
- Australian outback literature of the 20th century
