= Eskenazi (art gallery) =

Gallery of Chinese art in London, England

Coordinates: 51.510887°N 0.142426°W

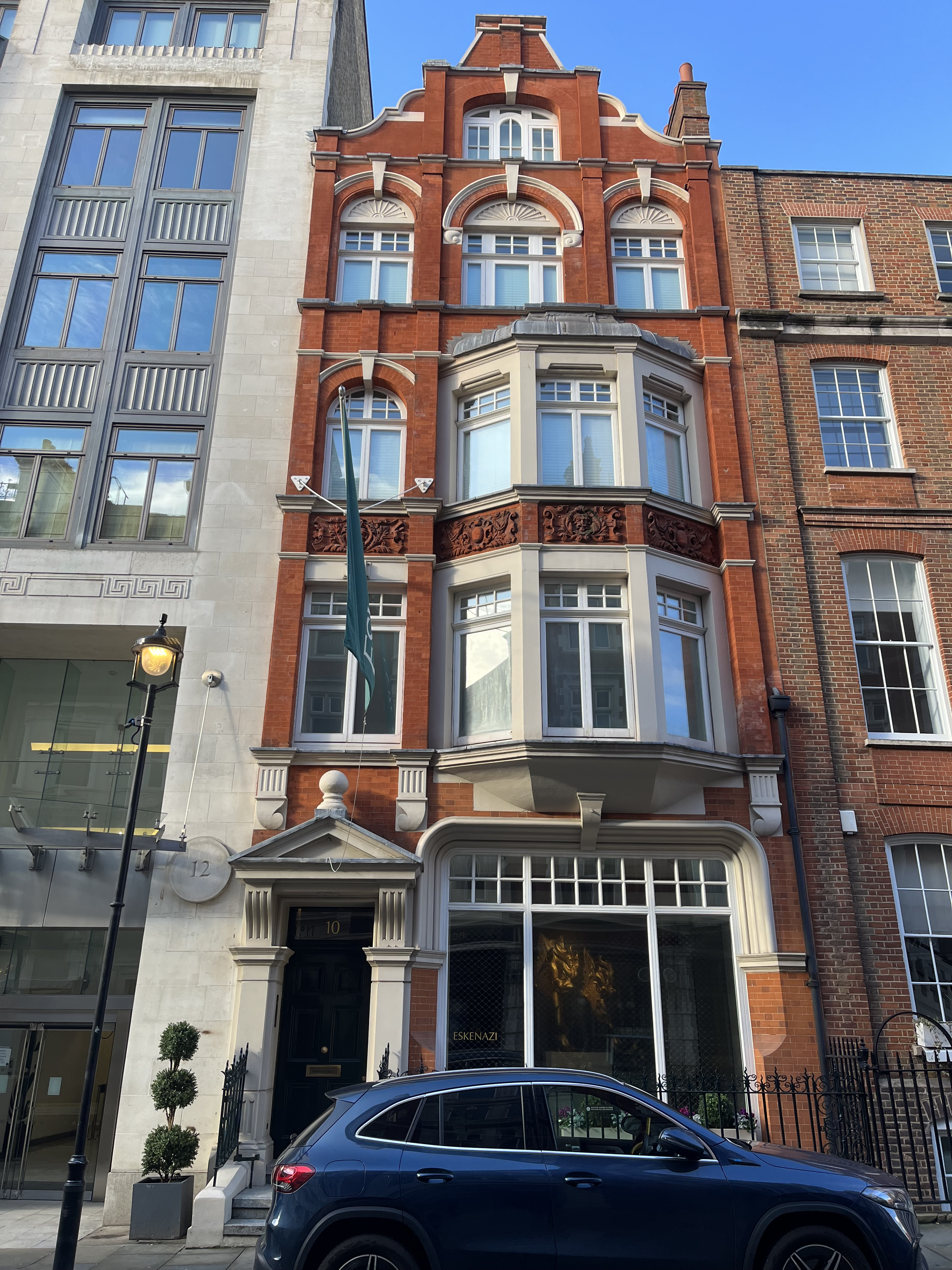
Eskenazi art gallery

Eskenazi is a London dealer in Chinese art and artefacts founded by Giuseppe Eskenazi. It opened in 1960 and moved to its current Mayfair gallery in 1993.

== History ==
In 1960, Giuseppe Eskenazi and his father opened an office in London, to supply the art gallery in Milan which was run by his cousin Vittorio. In 1972, the Eskenazi Museum was redesigned by John Prizeman. In 1973, King Gustaf VI Adolf of Sweden visited the gallery In 1978, British Rail Tang Horse was sold to the British Rail Pension Fund for £3.4 million.

Eskenazi is now managed by Giuseppe's son, Daniel, who joined the business in 1990. It is based in a six-floor gallery in Clifford Street, Mayfair, which includes a library and 25,000 reference books.

In 2022, Eskenazi celebrated 50 years of exhibitions; over this time, they have sold to more than 80 museums.
