= Stowaway to Mars =

1936 novel by John Wyndham

First edition cover (under original name).

Stowaway to Mars is a science fiction novel by British writer John Wyndham. It was first published in 1936 as Planet Plane (George Newnes Ltd, London), then serialised in The Passing Show as Stowaway to Mars and again in 1937 in Modern Wonder magazine as The Space Machine. The novel was written under one of Wyndham's early pen names, John Beynon. It was published by Coronet Books in 1972 as "Stowaway to Mars by John Wyndham".

Groff Conklin reviewed the first American edition, issued in 1954 as Stowaway to Mars as by John Benyon, with no mention that "Benyon" was really much better known as John Wyndham. Conklin criticized several plot elements, and a "faintly distasteful emphasis on British nationalism", but labelled the work as "an interesting adventure story."

The title novella of the collection Sleepers of Mars was a sequel.
