= Sleepers of Mars =

1973 short story collection by John Wyndham

Cover of the first edition by Chris Foss.

Sleepers of Mars is a collection of five early stories (one short story and four novelettes/novellas) by British writer John Wyndham, as by John Beynon Harris, published after his death, in 1973 by Coronet Books.

== Contents ==
- "Sleepers of Mars" (1939), novella, a sequel to the novel Stowaway to Mars
- "Worlds to Barter" (1931), novelette
- "Invisible Monster" (1933), novelette
- "The Man from Earth" (1934), novelette
- "The Third Vibrator" (1933)

== Summaries ==
"Sleepers of Mars"
a Russian expedition finds the remains of Martian civilisation.
"Worlds to Barter"
telling of the descendants of the human race travelling back in time to take over the current Earth.
"Invisible Monster"
an invisible alien on the loose after the return of a space expedition.
"The Man from Earth"
a human sent on a mission to Venus wakes up in the far future as the last human alive.
"The Third Vibrator"
the inventor of a super-weapon has a vision of how it previously destroyed Atlantis and Lemuria.

=== Plot summary of "Sleepers of Mars" ===
At the end of the previous novel, Stowaway to Mars, the British spaceship, the Gloria Mundi departed Mars, expecting the USSR ship to leave at the same time. It did not. In the Stowaway to Mars it is mentioned that while the British reached Earth safely, it was now several years later, and still there had been no sign of the Soviet vessel. This story tells their fate.

While on the planet in the previous story, the Soviet and British crews had explored part of Mars around their landing sites, discovering vegetation plant life, in the form of scrubby bushes growing along the banks of ancient canal works, with sluggish water still in them. The planet also hosted AI robots, hostile to the visitors from Earth. They seemed almost wild, feral machines living without control of organic life. Due to fatal encounters with these robots, and ill planned gunfight with the British crew, the Soviets now number four crewmen. Preparing to depart for Earth they discuss the fate of their mission - originally a race between the nations of Earth to be the first to reach Mars. The British and the Gloria Mundi had won the race, reach Mars before the Soviets and United States (whose rocket had crashed with no survivors upon reaching Mars). The Russians speculate what would be the global reaction if the Gloria Mundi reaches Earth, and then the Soviets return, and claim that they were the first to land on Mars, not the British. They conclude that they would not be believed. However, they reason that if they succeed in racing the British home, then they can claim that the USSR was the first to conquer the Red Planet, and the British will be disbelieved.

Both spaceships prepare to take off, with the Russians planning to boost their engines to achieve greater velocity than the smaller British craft. Upon take off, however, the Soviet ship suffers a malfunction, crash-landing back upon Mars. Although the ship is relatively undamaged and the four crew survive the impact, the ship has landed on its side and they lack the means to right it for take off. Even worse, they have no more fuel for a second attempt.

Stranded on Mars, their wrecked ship surrounded by the hostile robots, the Russians are saved by the arrival of more advanced and powerful robots, commanded by a Martian. Humanoid in appearance, he is one of the same Martians encountered by the British party (but not by the Soviets) in the previous story. His machines drive off the feral AIs, and allows the Russians to leave their ship. Using advanced technology, the Martian is able to modify the mind of one of their crew so that they can communicate.

The Martian offers to provide the Soviet crew safety in one of their enclosed cities while they decide what to do with them. Faced with few options the Russians agree. They are taken by the advanced robots to a nearby Martian city. They find it to be in good working order, fully automated, with dwellings suitable for their needs. There are no people living there however. Given an apartment within the city the Martian communicates with them via video screen from another settlement. Talking via the crew member they modified, the Martian explains to the Soviets how the Martians are a dying race, as is their world. Once fertile and full of life, Mars long ago ran short of water. As its rivers dried up, so its life died with it. There was even an attempt to melt the icecaps in an attempt to provide more water. While this worked for a time, eventually even this water was used up, only holding off the inevitable for a few generations and the planet continued to decline. The Martian tells that his people are now few in number, and expect that they will eventually become extinct. Asked to explain the robots, the Soviets are told how the Martians experimented with forms of artificial intelligence, and consider the robots to be their successors and evolutionary children. The rogue AIs encountered earlier in the novel were early attempts, and they now live beyond control of the Martians. The more advanced robots obey their commands, and perform such tasks as are required in the city.

The Martian is eager for the earthmen to leave his world, and expresses a willingness to aid them. He tells the Russians that they can remain as guests in the city while he will instruct the robots to repair their ship and refuel it for the voyage back to Earth. Due to their earlier encounter with the British, the Martian is confident that the city can produce both atmosphere and food suitable for the humans. While they wait for the repairs to be completed, the Soviets explore the abandoned city. They discover several interesting machines and devices, and their engineer believes that he can take several examples of advanced technology back to Earth that will give their country an advantage over the capitalist nations in the Cold War. The chance to learn of the Martian civilisation far eclipses losing the race back to Earth (the Gloria Mundi will by now have had such a head-start that catching them up will be impossible).

After several days of exploring, two of the crew discover a huge vault deep beneath the city. Inside are countless fluid-filled capsules containing apparently dead Martians. Opening one, they are shocked to discover that the occupant is alive, but the Martian female dies swiftly upon the opening of the container, likely due to trauma caused by incorrect revival. Realising that all the capsules contain living Martians in some form of suspended animation, the ship's doctor attempts to revive a second one. This time the Russians take the precaution of bringing the capsule to their quarters and preparing medical equipment before they try to awaken the second Martian.

Their efforts are successful, and the sleeper awakes, surviving the process. Once recovered he is able to talk with the modified Russian, and discuss his past. It seems that he was once part of a larger Martian population living many hundreds of years ago, at the time when the world was drying up. At the time the best hope for their civilisation was seen as the Project to Melt the Ice Caps. This great work would take many years to achieve, and with the aid of the robot workforce, only need a few Martians to supervise the project. To conserve water and resources, the vast majority of the population agreed to go into suspended animation for the decades it would take. They would be woken years later by the descendants of those who remained to direct the project, once the world was fertile once more. He is shocked to see the world at it is now - far worse and more barren than in his day. It appears that he and the other sleepers have been left to hibernate for far longer than originally envisaged.

The Soviet crew discuss the implications of this, speculating what happened. They conclude that while the early generations of Martians entered into the plan with good intentions, the later generations who had melted the poles, reneged on their ancestors' agreement. They had seen no reason to awaken these sleeping people, when they had done all the work, and could keep all the benefits for themselves. Now the world had dried up once more, and the sleepers would be left forever in the silent cities. The Russians are worried by this revelation, and also by the reaction of the Martian they woke. Angry at the betrayal of him, his wife and all his people he blames the current rulers of Mars. He claims that he can also order the robots, and will have revenge upon those who kept him dormant for so long.

The Earthmen argue about what course of action they should take. They debate warning the current Martians, given that their return to Earth depends on their goodwill, compared to the injustice suffered by the sleepers. Also if it will do any good at all, and if it is not best to pretend nothing happened. Eventually they prevail upon the modified crewman to use the video link to contact the main Martian settlement and warn them. He does so, causing their host to become displeased. The Russian assures his fellows that the ruling Martian was not too concerned, and that the robots have since been modified and that the sleepers can be stopped. Also their ship is now ready for launch, and they can depart the planet.

As they prepare to leave the city, the doctor confronts the modified crewman, revealing that he knows that he lied to them, and did not actually warn the ruling Martians. As they argue they spot more Martian sleepers now awake in the city, some armed, using machines to awaken others. It appears that their Martian friend has awoken other sleepers and is preparing to attack the ruling Martians. Before the four men can react, the sleeper they woke bursts into their quarters, and in an angry rage uses a raygun to kill the doctor. He is shot dead by the remaining Russians. They conclude that he had gone into hibernation beside his wife, and that she must have been the first sleeper they tried to awake and inadvertently killed. While arguing what to do, the Soviets notice from the window that sleepers are attempting to board their spaceship, now fuelled and ready for launch.

As two of the remaining crew race to the landing site to try and stop them, the last Soviet remains behind in the city. He watches as his comrades are unable to prevent several of the sleepers entering their ship and sealing the hatch. They are still on the boarding ladder when the ignition sequence is triggered and the ship blasts off, killing two Russians. The last Russian considers his options, locates the Martian's ray-gun and uses it to kill himself.

The ultimate fate of the Martian civilisation is unknown, nor the final landing site of the Russian ship, which could have carried a crew of Martians to a remote corner of Earth.
