= Laughing Gas (novel) =

1936 novel by P. G. Wodehouse

- First edition (UK)
- Author: P. G. Wodehouse
- Language: English
- Genre: Comic novel
- Publisher: Herbert Jenkins (UK); Doubleday, Doran (US)
- Publication date: 25 September 1936 (UK); 19 November 1936 (US)
- Publication place: United Kingdom
- Media type: Print (hardcover)
- Pages: 303 pp

Laughing Gas is a comic novel by P. G. Wodehouse, first published in the United Kingdom on 25 September 1936 by Herbert Jenkins, London, and in the United States on 19 November 1936 by Doubleday, Doran, New York. Written in first person narrative, the story is set in Hollywood in the early 1930s (the Depression is mentioned twice) and is, compared to, say, Budd Schulberg's What Makes Sammy Run? (1941), a light-hearted and exclusively humorous look at the film industry and in particular at child stars. Both Schulberg and Wodehouse describe the methods of all those would-be screenwriters and actors hunting for jobs, but Wodehouse's depiction is not at all serious or critical.

== Plot summary ==
Drone Reginald ("Reggie") Swithin, narrator of the story, is the third Earl of Havershot. He is 28, unmarried, and has a face like a gorilla. As the new head of his family, he is assigned a delicate task by his Aunt Clara and by Plimsoll, the family lawyer: He is to go to Hollywood and look for Aunt Clara's son, his cousin Eggy, who seems to have got himself into trouble, and bring him back home. In particular, Reggie is to prevent Eggy from getting engaged, let alone married, to some American gold-digger who would undoubtedly be far beneath the titled family.

On the train from Chicago to Los Angeles, Reggie meets the famous film actress April June, and immediately falls head over heels in love with her. Once in Hollywood, he completely forgets to look for Eggy until, one night, he bumps into him at a party that April June is giving. What is more, Eggy is accompanied by Ann Bannister, Reggie's ex-fiancée, who is now engaged to Eggy. According to Eggy, Ann wants to reform him: make him drink less, and get a job as well. As the host of the party, the seemingly wonderful, tender, and caring April June ("Money and fame mean nothing to me, Lord Havershot") is difficult to get hold of. When he finally succeeds in doing so and is just about to propose to her, Reggie's tooth—in the nick of time, as it turns out later—starts hurting so badly that he has to postpone all his plans, hurry home, and make an appointment with a dentist.

On the following afternoon, he is in I. J. Zizzbaum's waiting-room when he gets to know Joey Cooley, the 12-year-old movie star and darling of all American mothers. Joey is also going to have a tooth out, but Joey is going to be operated on by B. K. Burwash, Zizzbaum's rival—they have a common waiting-room—exactly at the same time as Reggie. Presently reporters storm the dentist's practice to take photos of Joey and interview him.

Both Reggie and Joey get laughing gas as anaesthetic. When Reggie regains consciousness he finds himself spoken to by B. K. Burwash, and also in the latter's chair. He concludes that there has been a switch in the fourth dimension: Joey's and his souls have changed bodies. Before he can clear up the situation, he is shoved into a car and brought "home".

Joey's home in Hollywood—originally he is from Chillicothe, Ohio, where his mother lives—is the Brinkmeyer estate, a kind of golden cage for little Joey. He has been informally adopted by T. P. Brinkmeyer, Hollywood film mogul, and his middle-aged sister, Miss Brinkmeyer, who turns out to be particularly nasty. Gradually, Reggie, in Joey's body, gets to know the latter's daily practice, which he finds horrifying: He has been put on a strict diet consisting mainly of dried prunes—but now he has the appetite of a 12-year-old! He must not leave the grounds except on official occasions, and he is not given any pocket money. He finds out very quickly that he can beat Miss Brinkmeyer's strict regime by climbing out of his bedroom window onto the roof of an outbuilding. He finds some confederates among the Brinkmeyers' staff (all of whom are aspiring actors who want to attract Brinkmeyer's attention by playing their servant roles in real life): The gardener readily supplies him with Mexican horned toads and some frogs (to hide in Miss Brinkmeyer's room and clothes); and Chaffinch, the butler, even suggests to him that he may be able to sell Joey's tooth to the press (who in turn might be willing to give it to a souvenir hunter) at the considerable price of $5,000. Desperate for some cash, Reggie agrees but is cheated out of the money by Chaffinch, who takes the money and runs off to New York. Moreover, Reggie is very disturbed when he learns that Ann Bannister has been hired to serve as girl Friday for Joey. For example, her duties include bathing the boy, which Reggie categorically refuses.

In the meantime, Joey, in Reggie's body, embarks on a tour of vengeance: He has sworn to (literally) "poke" all the unpleasant people around him "in the snoot", starting with his press agent and the director of a recent film of his. He also enters the Brinkmeyer estate and pushes Miss Brinkmeyer into the swimming pool. Wherever he goes, eyewitnesses describe him as looking like a gorilla. (Fair-haired Reggie Havershot admits earlier on in the novel that he is not particularly handsome.)

On the other hand, wherever Eggy (whose complexion, especially in the morning, is described as "greenish") meets Reggie in Joey's body, he thinks his drinking habits have got the better of him. He starts to panic and joins the Temple of the New Dawn, a temperance organisation, eventually becoming engaged to one of its promoters, Mabel Prescott. (All this happens in the course of only two days.) One of the meetings between Reggie/Joey and Eggy is when Eggy is hired as the kid's elocution teacher.

Reggie/Joey is also harassed by two other child film stars who live in the neighbourhood, but at least he discovers that he can outrun them. Also, he is kidnapped, but the whole abduction turns out to be a publicity stunt he has not been warned of.

While Reggie's soul is still inside Joey's body Reggie also realises that his beloved April June is a "pill" and a scheming and selfish little beast jealous of everybody else's success. When they are alone at her place, she even kicks him with her foot because by his turning up he has disturbed an interview for some magazine or newspaper. On the next morning his career abruptly comes to an end when it is in all the papers that he drank liquor and smoked.

At more or less the same time, a coincidence ends Reggie's ordeal: Just as he is walking along a street near where he has been held prisoner, Joey/Reggie comes along driving a police motorcycle and hitting the kid. After a brief period of being unconscious, they both come to again, to discover that they have switched bodies again. They both have to flee the city immediately: Joey because he wants to escape the Brinkmeyers' wrath; and Reggie because he does not want to be caught by the police for what Joey did while walking around in his body (poking several people in the nose, stealing a police motorcycle and similar misdemeanours). Ann Bannister has organised a car that will bring Joey back to his mother in Ohio, and Reggie readily agrees to accompany him. He also makes up with Ann, and they are going to be married.

== Publication history ==
Laughing Gas was serialised in This Week magazine (US) in six issues between 24 March and 28 April 1935, illustrated by Wallace Morgan. It was also serialised in Pearson's Magazine (UK), between August and October 1935.

The story was included in The Hollywood Omnibus, a collection of Wodehouse stories published in May 1985 by Hutchinson, London.

== See also ==
- Vice Versa (1882), a novel by F. Anstey
