= Giuseppe Eskenazi =

Turkish art dealer

Guiseppe Eskenazi
- Born: 1939 (age 86–87); Istanbul
- Occupation: Art dealer
- Known for: Chinese works of art

Giuseppe Eskenazi (born 1939, in Istanbul) has been described as the world's most important dealer in Chinese works of art. His company, Eskenazi, has sold to more than eighty of the world's major museums, as well as numerous private collectors.

== Early life and career ==
He spent his youth in Italy, where his great uncle had started a family business in Milan, an art gallery, in 1923. He opened a London office with his late father in 1960, originally buying for the family's antiques business in Milan. Eskenazi was studying medicine, but after the death of his father, decided to instead go into the antiques business and keep the family company going. The family was granted British citizenship in 1963 in Constantinople. He took over the business in his twenties. In 1971, he moved the gallery on Piccadilly to the first floor of the building, where he would showcase a single piece in a display. In 1972 he opened a gallery at Foxglove House, Piccadilly, with an inaugural exhibition of Early Chinese Ceramics and Works of Art. In 1993 he opened a purpose-built 6-floor gallery on Clifford Street in Mayfair, London and also formed part of the steering committee that established Asian Art in London, later acting as chairman for the event in 2002 and 2003. Between 1993 and 2007 he served on the Asia House Executive Committee and between 1998 and 2002 he was on the Council for the Oriental Ceramic Society. He was a Trustee of the Asia House Trust (London), 2000–2007, an advisor to the board of Bard Graduate Center in New York, 2000 to 2015, and an advisor to the Royal Academy of Art for the exhibitions 100 Masterpieces of Imperial Chinese Ceramics from the Au Bak Ling Collection (1998) and Return of the Buddha, The Qingzhou Discoveries (2002).

In 2006 he was appointed a Chevalier of the Légion d'honneur for services to the arts, and in particular for supplying remarkable works of art to the great museums of the world. In 2012, he published A Dealer’s Hand: The Chinese Art World Through the Eyes of Giuseppe Eskenazi. It was published in Chinese in 2015 and a second Chinese edition was released in 2017. He speaks six languages.

== Notable sales ==
He specializes in Chinese art, with a gallery off Bond Street in London. In 1984, the New York Times reported that he had recently sold two netsuke, including a horse by Masanoa of Kyoto to a collector for a total of $400,000. In 2012, he sold £140 million of Impressionist and early modern paintings in New York in one night. In 2013, he purchased a rare Chinese bowl that had garnered attention in the press for around $2.2 million at auction in New York. The bowl was Northern Song dynasty pottery.

== Personal life ==
He and his wife, Laura, are residents of London. His son, Daniel, runs the gallery as of 2022, with Eskenazi still frequenting the dealership.

== See also ==
- List of art dealers
