= Buck's Club =

Gentlemen's club in London

Coordinates: 51°30′39.47″N 0°8′28.77″W

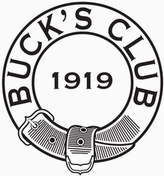

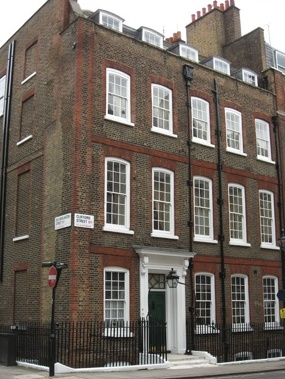
- Company type: Gentlemen's club
- Founded: 1919
- Founder: Herbert John Buckmaster
- Headquarters: 18 Clifford Street, London, United Kingdom, SW1
- Website: bucksclub.co.uk

Buck's Club is a gentlemen's club in London, located at 18 Clifford Street, established in June 1919. P. G. Wodehouse mentions it in some stories and modelled his Drones Club mostly after Buck's. It is probably best known for the Buck's Fizz cocktail, created there in 1921 by its bartender McGarry.

In 1979, Anthony Lejeune wrote in his book The Gentlemen's Clubs of London that "Buck's Club is the only London Club to have been founded since the First World War which ranks, in social prestige and elegance, with the best of St James's Street clubs: and like them, it is named after its founder." In 2019, the club received media attention for its dinners, in which young women are invited to entertain the elderly male members.

== History ==
During the First World War, Captain Herbert John Buckmaster (1881-1966) of the Royal Horse Guards and some of his colleagues agreed that after the war it would be good to establish a gentlemen's club that was somewhat less stuffy than existing clubs. They particularly wanted a club with an American cocktail bar, something then beyond the pale for most traditional gentlemen's clubs.

The club was established in June 1919 and its American Bar was a focal point. American members were welcome although treated separately from a constitutional standpoint. The club for many years kept its tradition of sourcing members from the Household Cavalry regiments although its membership is now drawn from many walks of life and is renowned for its exuberance and the youth of its membership.

The Club is probably best known for seeing the creation of the Buck's Fizz cocktail in 1921 by its first bartender, Mr McGarry (Barman from 1919 to 1941, sometimes "Malachy McGarry" or "Pat McGarry", or spelled "MacGarry", he is also usually credited with creating the Sidecar cocktail).

It receives three mentions in the stories of P. G. Wodehouse; Wodehouse modelled his fictional Drones Club after Buck's Club and the Bachelors' Club, even naming his club's barman "McGarry" too.

== Bond Street Horticultural Society ==
The "Bond Street Horticultural Society", also known as "Nieces' Night", is a dinner held several times a year at Buck's. On this occasion, the members are encouraged to invite young women to come along, who are then rotated between tables with each course. While some women told the Financial Times that they enjoyed the attention by the all-male, mostly elderly members, others described the experience as unpleasant or "vile". The club discussed discontinuing the tradition after the Presidents Club scandal in 2018 exposed sexual misconduct at another all-male high-society dinner, but decided against it.

== See also ==
- List of London's gentlemen's clubs
