= London Art Exchange =

Commercial art gallery in London

Coordinates: 51.52060°N 0.13941°W

- Trade name: LAX
- Type: Private limited company
- Industry: Commercial art gallery
- Headquarters: London, England
- Key people: Kylie Susan James (director)
- Website: www.thelax.art

London Art Exchange (LAX) is a commercial art gallery and art dealer in London, England. It is operated by London Art Exchange Ltd, which was incorporated in September 2020. The gallery holds exhibitions of contemporary art and has taken part in art fairs and other art projects. In 2025, it hosted the first solo art exhibition by actor and artist Nitin Ganatra.

== History and operations ==
London Art Exchange Ltd was incorporated on 11 September 2020 as a company engaged in the retail sale of commercial art. The company's subsequent filings record its development as a registered business, with gallery activity under the London Art Exchange name recorded from 2023.

London Art Exchange operates gallery spaces in central London. In 2026, it began working with Brunswick Art Gallery in Bloomsbury, with the two galleries collaborating on exhibitions and events.

== Exhibitions and projects ==
London Art Exchange took part in the 2025 Fresh Art Fair at Alexandra Palace. Exhibitions held at the gallery during the year included Deborah Jones's Gilded Wilderness in March 2025 and Gabrielle Malak's Rêve d'Été in August 2025.

In September 2025, the gallery hosted Fragments of Belonging, the first solo art exhibition by actor and artist Nitin Ganatra, at 13 Soho Square, London W1D 3QF. The exhibition featured paintings exploring themes of identity, migration and belonging.

Exhibitions held in early 2026 included Alchemy of the Elements and The Grand Masters: 500 Years of Art on Paper.

In September 2026, London Art Exchange worked with La Maison Ani at the Jumeirah Carlton Tower in Knightsbridge on a project featuring the work of Gabrielle Malak. Two of Malak's paintings, Love Letter and Eternal Été, were displayed alongside dishes created in response to the works. The collaboration was also covered by FLO London.

== Community activities ==
In August 2024, London Art Exchange donated artworks to Hammersmith, Fulham, Ealing and Hounslow Mind (HFEH Mind). The works included Bear Club by Jakob The Artist and Since You Came Along by Mr Phantom, and were displayed at The Circle in South Ealing ahead of a planned fundraising auction. The artworks were also taken to local schools as part of workshops connected with the project.

London Art Exchange has also supported Smurfy in Soho, a West London Mind project involving the street artist Smurfy.
