= Germain Seligman =

Modern art dealer

Germain Seligman (25 February 1893, Paris – 27 March 1978, New York) was a successful art dealer, collector, and art historian. From 1924, Seligman headed the Paris and New York offices of Jacques Seligmann & Cie., a prominent art dealership. Originally named Germain Seligmann with two Ns, he dropped one of them in 1943 when he obtained United States citizenship.

== Biography ==
=== Beginnings ===
The son of Jacques Seligmann, a German-born French and American antiquarian and art dealer, Seligman was raised in Paris in the luxurious Hôtel de Monaco. He showed an early interest in art and often visited the company's galleries together with his father who introduced him to the art trade. He frequently joined his father on business trips including a one to St. Petersburg in 1910 in connection with the acquisition of the Swenigorodskoi enamels.

Seligman joined the French army immediately after the outbreak of the First World War in 1914 where he served first in the 132nd Infantry Regiment of Reims and, from 1916, in the 24th Infantry Brigade where he was promoted to captain. In 1917, he acted as liaison officer to the First Division of the American Expeditionary Forces where he served as translator for George C. Marshall.

=== Moving company priorities to modern art ===
In 1920, after being discharged at the end of the war, Seligman became a partner in his father's company. As a result, the name was changed to Jacques Seligmann et Fils. He became president of the New York office where he concentrated fully on art rather than the antiquarian market in which his father had first been interested. In 1923, on the death of his father, he became president of both the Paris and New York interests, changing the name back to Jacques Seligmann & Cie.

Seligman developed a strong interest in modern art for the New York gallery, dealing in works by Pierre Bonnard, Paul Cézanne, Honoré Daumier, Edgar Degas, Henri Rousseau, and Vincent van Gogh but in the face of resistance from other members of the family turned to César Mange de Hauke who had studied art in England and France and arrived in the United States in 1926. For a short period de Hauke worked as a sales representative for Seligman but the two soon decided to set up a subsidiary, de Hauke & Co., Inc., to deal in modern art. Established in 1926, the company purchased art in Paris and London for sales in the United States. Works by Amedeo Modigliani, Odilon Redon, Ker-Xavier Roussel and Édouard Vuillard were exhibited and sold in New York. Soon coverage was extended to Paul Cézanne, Jacques-Louis David, Eugène Delacroix, Jean Ingres, Pierre-Auguste Renoir, and Georges Seurat. Pablo Picasso was featured twice, first in 1936 with paintings from the Blue Period and the Rose Period, and second in the November 1937 exhibition Twenty Years in the Evolution of Picasso showcasing the painting Les Demoiselles d'Avignon which Seligman had acquired from the Jacques Doucet estate. The Museum of Modern Art acquired the painting for $24,000 raising $18,000 toward the purchase price by selling a Degas painting and obtaining the remainder from donations by the co-owners of the gallery Germain Seligman and Cesar de Hauke. As a result of the successful new business strategy, the other family members withdrew their opposition and Jacques Seligmann & Co., Inc. adopted Seligman's evolving preferences. De Hauke's company was dissolved and de Hauke returned to Paris. Seligman was a member of committee coordinating art for the New York World Fair in 1939.

=== Nazi looting ===
In the late 1930s, the Paris office came under increasing pressure as a result of political developments. Many of the assets were taken over by the Vichy government and sold at public auction. The archives were burnt by company staff to prevent confiscation by the Nazis. Seligman moved the company headquarters to New York in 1937.

After the war, Seligman's efforts were concentrated on recovering artworks looted by the Nazis. There was a general family reconciliation with all working towards the interests of the company. In 1951, the Duke of Arenberg commissioned the company to sell an important collection of illuminated manuscripts and other artworks.

=== Marriage ===
On June 6, 1946, Seligman married Ethlyne Jackson (1907-1993) of Kansas City, Missouri. Jackson, a college graduate with a degree in art history, had thirteen years’ experience at the Nelson Gallery in Kansas City: not only had she served as executive secretary to the gallery’s first director, Paul Gardner, she had been curator of the gallery's decorative arts collection as well as their American period rooms. In November 1942 Jackson became acting director of the gallery when Paul Gardner was commissioned as a major in the US Army, to become one of the famed Monuments Men in North Africa and Europe. Jackson was acting director for three years and a month, until Gardner's return in December 1945. After the wedding, she moved to New York City to live with her new husband.

=== Closure of the company ===
On Seligman's death in 1978, the company closed. There was recognition of the leading part he and his father had played in developing interest in art in the United States. Those who benefitted from the company's activities included a number of art collectors as well as art museums and institutions such as the Metropolitan Museum of Art, the Museum of Modern Art in New York and the National Gallery of Art.

== Seligman's written works ==
Seligman began writing in the 1940s, publishing a monograph on Roger de La Fresnaye in 1945 and one on The Drawings of Georges Seurat in 1947. His "Oh! Fickle Taste; or, Objectivity in Art" (1952) he traced the social changes influencing trends in American art collection. His "Merchants of Art, 1880-1960: Eighty Years of Professional Collecting" (1961) described the development of his father's business while "Roger de La Fresnaye" with a Catalogue Raisonné (1969) was included in the New York Times list of the best ten books of the year.

== Awards ==
- Croix de Guerre, 1919
- Legion of Honour, 1938
- Distinguished Service Medal for his service during the First World War
