= A Visit to the Art Dealer =

1600s painting by Frans Francken the Younger

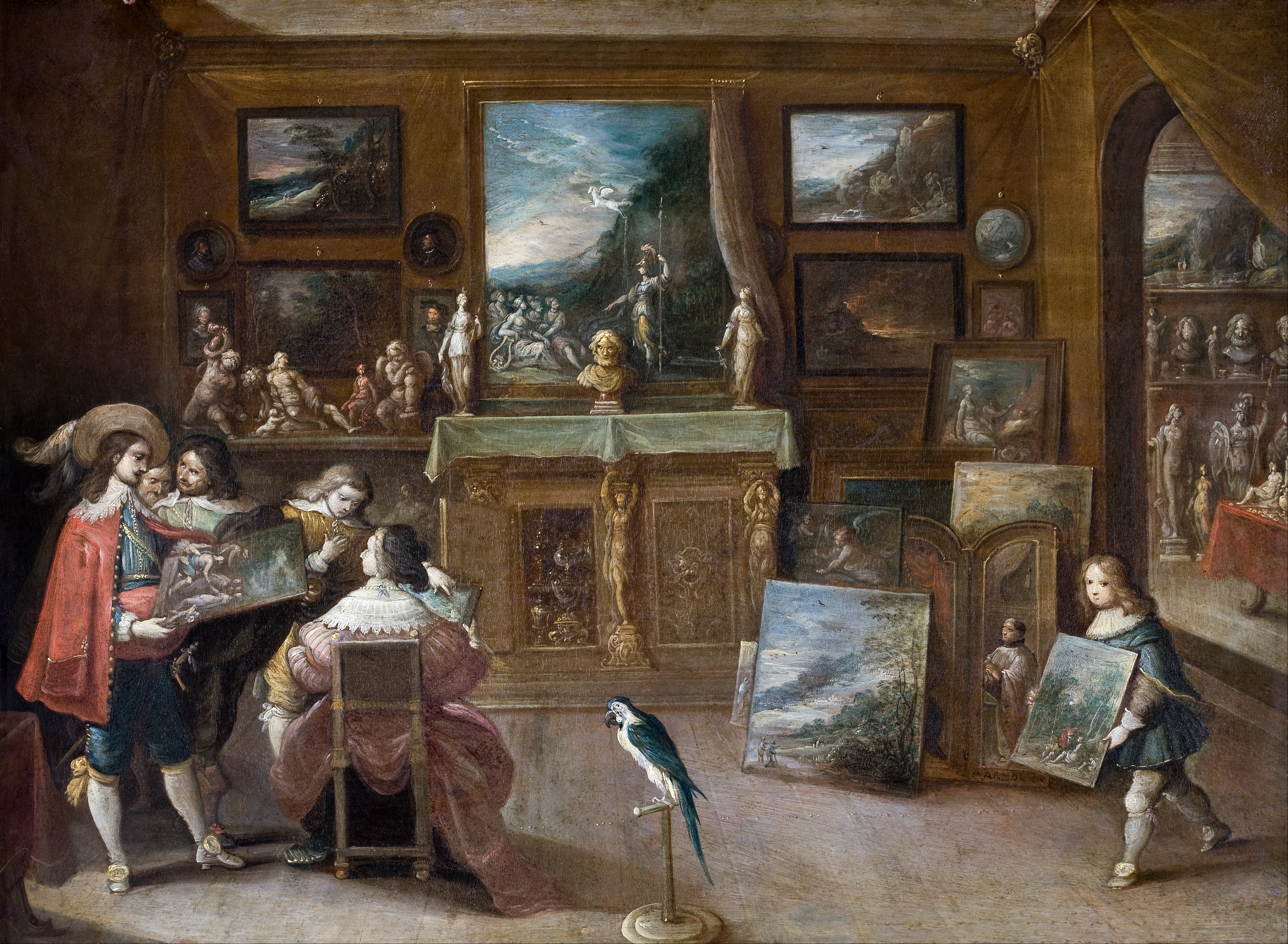
- Artist: Frans Francken the Younger
- Year: 1636
- Medium: Oil on copper
- Movement: Flemish, Antwerp school
- Dimensions: 290 cm × 405 cm (110 in × 159 in)
- Location: Hallwyl Museum, Stockholm

A Visit to the Art Dealer is an oil on copper made by Frans Francken the Younger in 1636. It is kept on Hallwyl Museum, in Stockholm.
