= Jacques Seligmann =

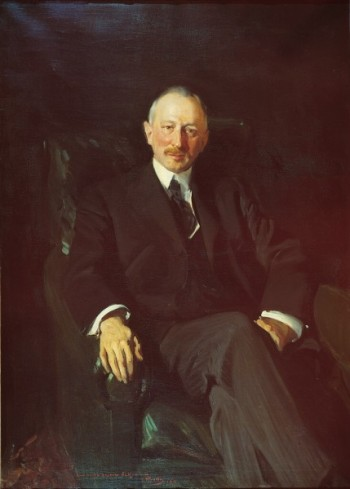
Jacques Seligmann, portrait by Joaquín Sorolla, 1911

Jacques (Jacob) Seligmann (18 September 1858, in Frankfurt-am-Main – 30 October 1923, in Paris) was a highly successful antiquarian and art dealer with businesses in both Paris and New York. He was one of the first to foster American interest in building collections of European art.

== Biography ==
Born in the Free City of Frankfurt, Seligmann moved to Paris in 1874 where he worked for Paul Chevallier, an auctioneer, and Charles Mannheim, an art expert, before opening his own business on the Rue des Mathurins in 1880 with Edmond de Rothschild as one of his early clients. In 1900, together with his brothers Arnold and Simon, he established the firm Jacques Seligmann & Cie. which moved the same year to the Place Vendôme. Seligman opened a New York office in 1904, visiting it once a year. His customers included members of the Russian Stroganoff family, the high-flying British politician Sir Philip Sassoon and American collectors such as Benjamin Altman, William Randolph Hearst, J. P. Morgan, Henry Walters, and Joseph Widener.

Initially Seligmann dealt mainly in antiques including enamels, ivories, sculptures, tapestries and especially 18th century French furniture but paintings became increasingly important at the beginning of the 20th century. After the end of the First World War, interest in European art grew in the United States led by socialites such as Walter Arensberg, Albert C. Barnes, Louisine Havemeyer, Bertha Palmer, Duncan Phillips, and John Quinn.

In 1909, Seligmann bought the prestigious Hôtel de Monaco where he established his headquarters and received his most important clients. After a dispute with his brother Arnold, there was a split in the company: Arnold continued to manage the Place Vendôme site as Arnold Seligmann & Cie. while Seligmann consolidated his activities at the Hôtel de Monaco and, in 1912, opened a new Paris office at 9 Rue de la Paix. In 1914, Seligmann opened a new office and gallery on New York's Fifth Avenue and incorporated his company in the State of New York. The same year, while in Paris, he was successful in buying a large part of Sir Richard Wallace's renowned collection which contained a variety of valuable antiques and art works. In 1920, his son Germain Seligman became a partner and president of the New York office, formally joining Jacques Seligmann & Fils. Seligmann died in Paris in October 1923.

== Honours ==
- Fellow of the New York Metropolitan Museum of Art (1907)

== Family ==
Seligmann's son, Germain Seligman, was born in Paris on 25 February 1893. His mother's maiden name was Blanche Falkenberg.
