= Poinsettia (cocktail) =

Cocktail of champagne, triple sec, and cranberry juice

A poinsettia cocktail is a mixture of champagne, Cointreau (or triple sec), and cranberry juice. It is named after the poinsettia flower, commonly associated with Christmas.

== See also ==
- List of cocktails
