= The Passing Show (magazine) =

Defunct British weekly magazine

- Editor: W. Comyns Beaumont (1915–1919); Augustus Muir (1920–1924); William A. Williamson (1925–1939)
- Frequency: Weekly
- Publisher: Odhams Press
- Country: United Kingdom
- Language: English

The Passing Show was a weekly magazine published in London from 1915 to 1939 by Odhams Press.

== History of publication ==
Named after the musical revue, The Passing Show was first published on 20 March 1915. From 26 March 1926 for eight editions it was renamed The New Passing Show, then reverting to its original title on 21 May 1926.

The Passing Show was noted for its publication of science fiction stories. Edgar Rice Burroughs's science fiction novel Pirates of Venus was published first in serial form in the United States in 1932 in Argosy and the following year in the United Kingdom in The Passing Show. John Wyndham's novel Stowaway to Mars was serialised in The Passing Show in 1936. P. G. Wodehouse's The Luck of the Bodkins was first published in The Passing Show. Bruce Bairnsfather's cartoon strip Old Bill and Bert appeared in The Passing Show from 1933 to 1938. A number of short stories by the Australian novelist and short story writer Louis Kaye were first published in The Passing Show.

== Closure ==
Its last edition was on 25 February 1939, following which it was merged into its Odhams Press stablemate, Weekly Illustrated, which was then renamed Illustrated. In turn, Illustrated was merged into John Bull in 1958.

== Editors ==
There were three editors over the life of the magazine.

- 1915-19: W. Comyns Beaumont.
- 1920-24: Augustus Muir.
- 1925-39: William A. Williamson.

== Legacy ==
A student magazine at Macquarie University in Australia, Passing Show, was named for the British magazine, and was published from 1973 to 2002.
