= Jacques Seligmann & Company =

French and American art dealer

Jacques Seligmann & Co.
- Location: Rue du Sommerard, Paris, France; 7 West 36th St., New York, New York, United States
- Owner: Jacques Seligmann; Germain Seligman
- Type: Art gallery
- Events: Antiquities; Decorative arts

Construction
- Opened: 1880
- Closed: 1978

Jacques Seligmann & Co. was a French and American art dealer and gallery specializing in decorative art and antiques. It is considered one of the foremost dealers and galleries in fostering appreciation for the collecting of contemporary European art. Many pieces purchased through Jacques Seligmann & Co. now reside in the collections of fine art museums and galleries worldwide, donated to those institutions by private purchasers of work from the dealer.

== History ==
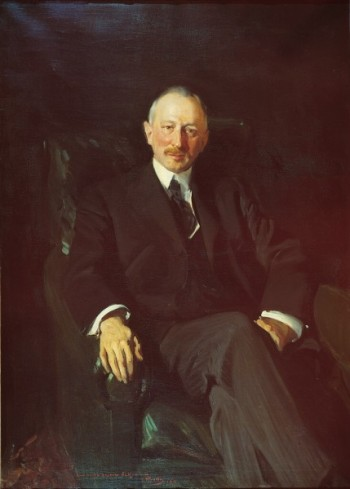
Jacques Seligmann, portrait by Joaquín Sorolla, 1911

=== A family affair ===
Jacques Seligmann & Co. was founded in Paris, France in 1880 by Jacques Seligmann (1858–1923), a German émigré who arrived in France in 1874 and became a French citizen. The small gallery, located on the Rue du Sommerard quickly became successful and in 1900 moved to a better location: Galerie Seligmann, on the Place Vendôme. Jacques' two brothers, Simon and Arnold, joined the gallery during this time, Simon as accountant and Arnold handling correspondence with clients. Jacques remained manager and handled all purchases. The demand of the American market led the gallery to open a New York office at 7 West 36th St in 1904. In 1909 Seligmann bought the Palais de Sagan in Paris, which served as the showcase venue for large exhibitions and client visits. Early notable clientele included Edmond James de Rothschild, the Stroganov family, Philip Sassoon, Benjamin Altman, William Randolph Hearst, J. P. Morgan, Henry Walters, and Joseph Widener.

A family quarrel erupted in 1912 and a lawsuit split the company: Arnold retained the Place Vendôme venue and changed the name to Arnold Seligmann & Co. and Jacques moved his headquarters to the Palais de Sagan and opened a new space at 17 Place Vendôme. Shortly thereafter Jacques' Place Vendôme space moved to 9 Rue de la Paix and the New York office moved to a larger space at 705 Fifth Avenue. As one family member left, another joined Jacques Seligmann & Co., Germain Seligman, Jacques' son (the second n being dropped from his name when he became an American citizen). Germain learned skills in customer service and sales, accompanying his father on purchase trips. In 1910 he went to Saint Petersburg to investigate the selling of the Swenigorodskoi enamels. Germain left the gallery in 1914 to fight for the French army in World War I and returned to rejoin the family company as a partner in 1920. Upon his father's death in 1923, Germain became president of the company.

=== Decorative to modern ===
Les Demoiselles d'Avignon (1907) was featured in the Picasso exhibition Twenty Years in the Evolution of Picasso. Jacques Seligmann & Co. sold the painting to the Museum of Modern Art in 1937.

In the early years Jacques Seligmann & Co. focused on the purchase and sales of decorative art related to Byzantine and Renaissance periods to satisfy the trends of the time. At the turn of the century, as tastes evolved, so did the gallery's inventory. World War I caused a lapse in sales in Europe, but interest in the United States was high specifically in modern art and Impressionism. After the war sales resumed in Europe and Germain started to sell works by Pierre Bonnard, Honoré Daumier, Pablo Picasso, Vincent van Gogh, and other modern masters. Other members of the family disapproved of Germain's modern interests, and he eventually formed a subsidiary, International Contemporary Art Company, Inc., along with business partner César Mange de Hauke. The name changed to de Hauke & Company, as de Hauke was named director, and it focused on contemporary European art. Purchases were made in Paris and London and sales were primarily in the United States.

The sales of these contemporary works were sold as inventory through Jacques Seligmann & Co. or privately by de Hauke's company. A complicated process regarding commission and ownership, a space was provided for de Hauke & Co. in the New York gallery where Jacques Seligmann & Co. was headquartered, now at 3 E. 51st St. During the late 1920s de Hauke exhibited the work of the French School in New York, his favorites leaning towards drawings and watercolors. His exhibitions frequently showed work by Paul Cézanne, Eugène Delacroix, Pierre-Auguste Renoir, Jean Ingres and Georges Seurat. Pablo Picasso was featured twice, first in 1936 with paintings from the Blue Period and the Rose Period, and second in the November 1937 exhibition Twenty Years in the Evolution of Picasso which showcased the painting Les Demoiselles d'Avignon which Seligman had acquired from the Jacques Doucet estate. The Museum of Modern Art acquired the painting for $24,000 raising $18,000 toward the purchase price by selling a Degas painting and obtaining the remainder from donations by the co-owners of the gallery Germain Seligman and Cesar de Hauke.

The success of de Hauke & Co. changed the attitudes of the Seligmann family in regard to their interest in modern art sales and eventually de Hauke & Co. was renamed Modern Paintings, Inc. De Hauke was named director but tensions arose and by 1931 he had resigned and moved back to Paris.

=== World War II ===
In 1934 Modern Paintings, Inc. was dissolved, its assets being absorbed by Jacques Seligmann & Co. and Tessa Corporation, another subsidiary of the company. In 1935 another subsidiary was founded: the Contemporary American Department, which was formed to represent emerging American artists, led by gallery employee Theresa D. Parker. In Paris, the city offered to purchase Palais de Sagan in connection with plans for the Exposition Internationale des Arts et Techniques dans la Vie Moderne in 1937. Jacques Seligmann & Co. focused its Paris business at the Rue de la Paix location, and New York became the international headquarters. Germain's half-brother, Francois-Gérard, ran the Paris office, and Germain continued to travel back and forth across the Atlantic until he made New York his permanent residence in 1939. Germain served on the Exhibition Committee for the 1939 New York World's Fair, coordinating the art area and the French art section.

In June 1940 as the Germans occupied Paris the company's sales plummeted and that summer the Seligmann galleries and family holdings were seized by the Vichy government, including Germain's private art collection. The majority of the Paris firm's stock and the family house and contents were sold at private auction. The family burned their Paris archives in order to prevent their acquisition by the Nazis. The New York office moved from 51st St. to a smaller space at 5 E. 57th St. Arnold Seligmann & Co. was left without a director, and Germain consolidated the two family businesses after a reconciliation between quarreling family members. The financial and administrative interests of the Paris and New York offices were separated, and remained linked only by association.

=== Later years ===
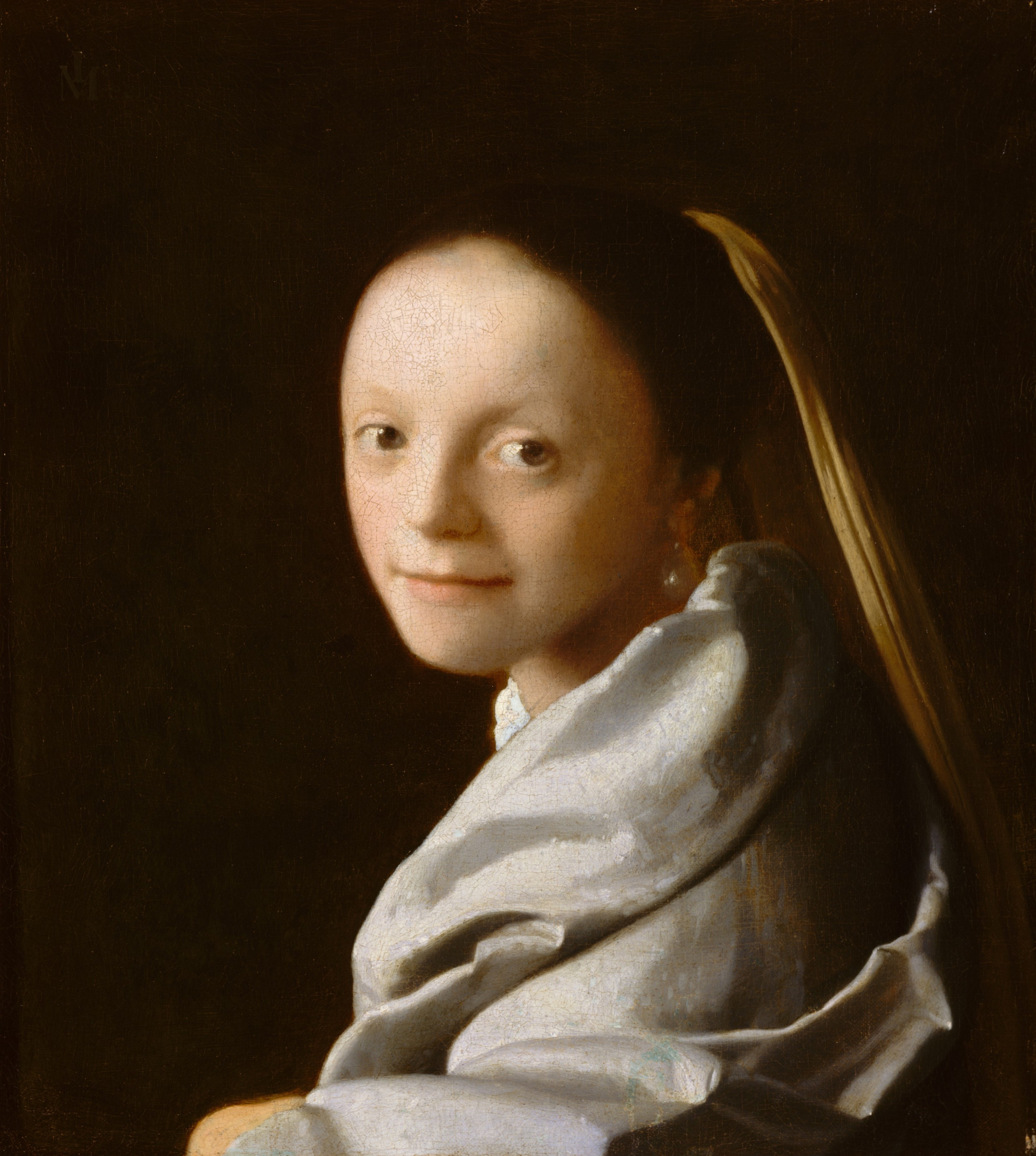
Portrait of a Young Woman by Johannes Vermeer which the company sold for over a quarter million dollars.

After the war, Jacques Seligmann & Co. focused heavily on the recovery of looted art and property, as well as on the organization of business matters. In 1951 Germain sold the House of Arenberg's family collection of illuminated manuscripts, engravings and paintings, including Portrait of a Young Woman by Johannes Vermeer which sold for over a quarter million dollars. In 1953 they sold works from the collection of Franz Joseph II, Prince of Liechtenstein, and purchased seven Italian marble sculptures which were sold to the Kress Foundation in 1954. The firm continued to exhibit works by contemporary artists, only to turn the focus back towards traditional art and drawings, struggling to regain the leading edge they once held in the art market. The firm closed in 1978 after the death, that year, of Germain Seligman.

== Legacy ==
Germain Seligman's numerous publications on fine art are now out of print. His Roger de La Fresnaye, with a Catalogue Raisonné, (1969) was declared one of the "Best Ten Books of the Year" by The New York Times. The company records were donated in 1978 by Ethlyne Seligman, the widow of Germain Seligman, to the Archives of American Art, with an additional being donated in 1994. In 2001 the collection was processed with funding by the Getty Foundation, followed by a $100,000 grant from the Kress Foundation to fully digitize the collection for online public access.

Many institutions maintain works of art that once passed through Jacques Seligmann & Co. These include:

- Contrast of Forms by Fernand Léger, 1913, at the Philadelphia Museum of Art
- Dance at Bougival by Pierre-Auguste Renoir, 1883, at the Museum of Fine Arts, Boston
- The Empress Eugénie by Franz Xaver Winterhalter, 1854, at the Metropolitan Museum of Art
- Man with a Guitar by Pablo Picasso, 1912, at the Philadelphia Museum of Art
- Mitten Gauntlet for the Left Hand, attributed to Anton Peffenhauser, 1563, at the Saint Louis Art Museum
- Washerwomen in a Willow Grove by Camille Corot, 1871, at the Clark Art Institute

== Archives ==
The Department of Image Collections at the National Gallery of Art Library holds photographs if artworks sold by the New York branch of Seligmann's gallery. Related papers are housed at the Archives of American Art in Washington, DC.
