= Buck's fizz =

Cocktail of orange juice and champagne

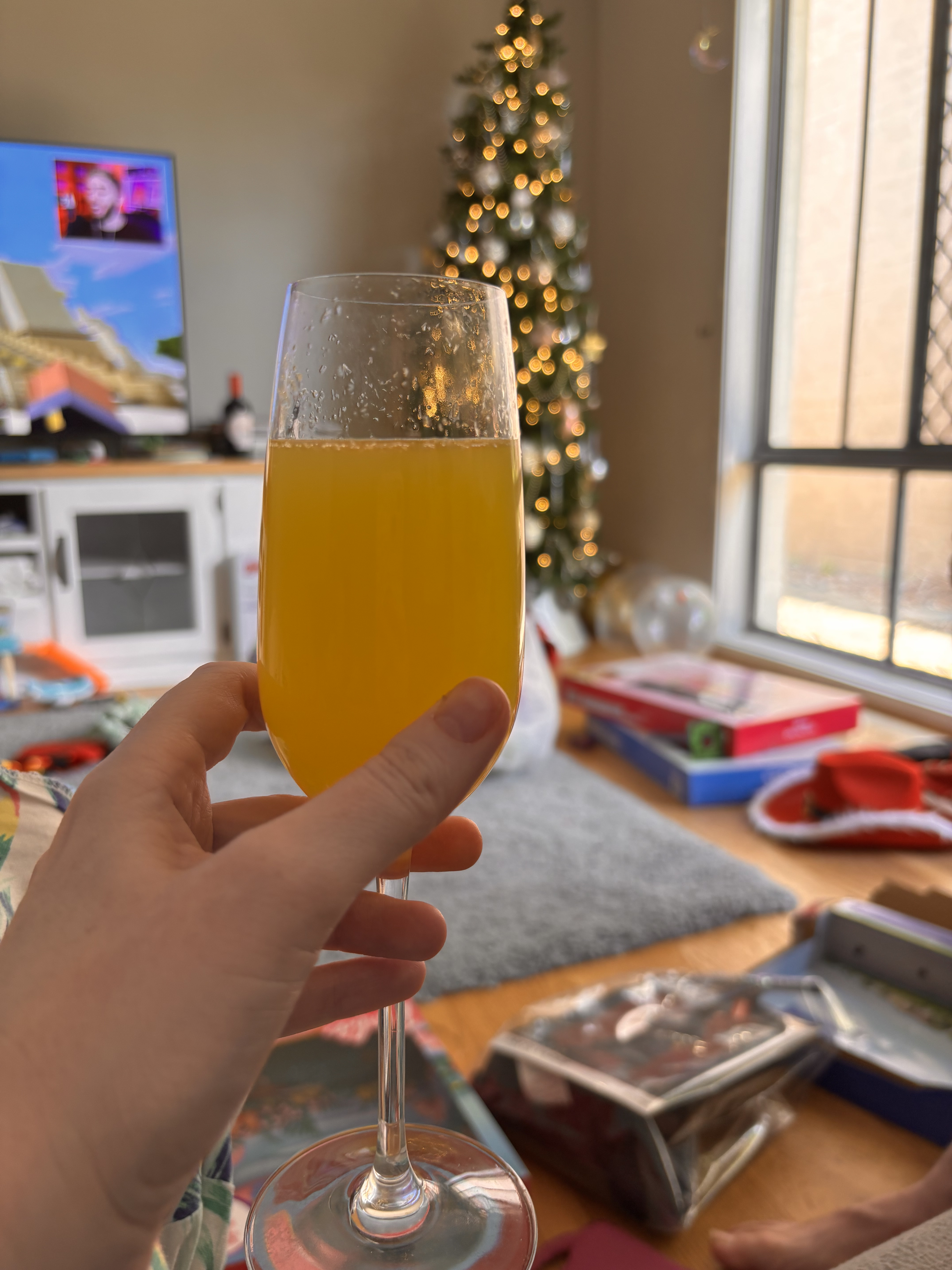
- Type: Wine cocktail
- Ingredients: 5 cl (1 part) orange juice; 10 cl (2 parts) Champagne
- Standard drinkware: Champagne flute
- Standard garnish: orange twist
- Served: chilled
- Preparation: Pour the orange juice into glass and top up Champagne. Stir gently, garnish and serve.

Buck's fizz is an alcoholic cocktail made of about two parts sparkling wine, typically champagne, to one part orange juice. It is essentially the same as the mimosa; the International Bartenders Association considers the two drinks synonymous. Other sparkling wines may also be used.

== Overview ==
The drink is named after London's Buck's Club, where it is said to have first been served in 1921 by a barman named Malachi "Pat" McGarry (who features in the works of P. G. Wodehouse as the barman of Buck's Club and the Drones Club). Traditionally, it is made by mixing two parts champagne and one part orange juice. Some older recipes list grenadine as an additional ingredient. The original Buck's Club recipe is said to contain additional ingredients known only to the club's bartenders.

Buck's fizz is popularly served at weddings as a less alcoholic alternative to champagne. In the United Kingdom, it is a popular part of a Christmas breakfast. Many people also drink it on New Year's Eve.

In 1981, the name was adopted by a British pop group which went on to win a Eurovision title.

More recently, prosecco has been used in the cocktail in the place of champagne as a sparkling wine.

== See also ==
- Fizz (cocktail) family of cocktails
