= Benjamin V. Cohen =

American lawyer

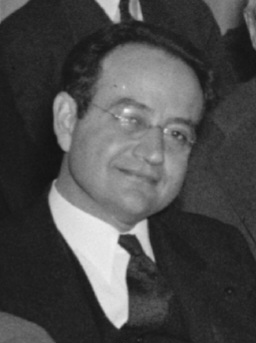
- Benjamin V. Cohen

6th Counselor of the United States Department of State
- In office September 14, 1945 – July 31, 1947
- President: Harry S. Truman
- Preceded by: R. Walton Moore
- Succeeded by: Charles E. Bohlen

Personal details
- Born: September 23, 1894 Muncie, Indiana
- Died: August 15, 1983 (aged 88) Washington, D.C.
- Education: University of Chicago; Harvard Law School
- Occupation: Lawyer
- Known for: Key member of Franklin Roosevelt's brain trust

Benjamin Victor Cohen (September 23, 1894 – August 15, 1983), was an American lawyer and member of the administrations of Franklin D. Roosevelt and Harry S. Truman who had a public service career that spanned from the early New Deal to after the Vietnam War.

== Education ==
Cohen earned Bachelor of Philosophy (1914) and J.D. (1915) degrees from the University of Chicago, and a Doctor of Juridical Science (1916) from Harvard Law School.

== Early career, Brain Trust, New Deal ==
Cohen was a law clerk to Judge Julian Mack. He served as counsel for the American Zionist Movement from 1919 to 1921, during which he acted as Zionist counsel to the 1919 Paris Peace Conference. Cohen practiced law in New York from 1921 to 1933. During this period Cohen worked with the National Consumers League to draft and enact minimum wage, child labor, and worker hours legislation that would survive a challenge in the Supreme Court.

Cohen first appeared on the national scene as a member of President Franklin D. Roosevelt's Brain Trust. Cohen became a part of the Roosevelt administration in 1933 when Felix Frankfurter, then a Harvard Law School professor, brought Cohen, Thomas Corcoran, and James M. Landis together to write what became the Truth In Securities Act. Later that year Cohen was assigned to work on railroad legislation.

Much of Cohen's work during the New Deal was in conjunction with Corcoran. Together they were known as the "Gold Dust Twins" and appeared on the cover of Time magazine's September 12, 1938, edition. By 1940 their friendship was well known enough to be used as a simile in P.G. Wodehouse's novel, Quick Service.

== World War II and postwar ==
In 1941, before the United States entered World War II, Cohen helped write the Lend-Lease plan. Cohen also assisted in the drafting of the 1944 Dumbarton Oaks agreements leading to the establishment of the United Nations. In 1945 Cohen served as the United States' chief draftsman at the Potsdam Conference.

In 1942, The New York Times published a letter by Cohen and the co-author Erwin Griswold decrying the United States Supreme Court's Betts v. Brady ruling that poor criminal defendants had no right to an attorney. Two decades later the issue again came before the Supreme Court in the Gideon v. Wainwright case. The attorneys for Clarence Earl Gideon, the person accused of a crime, concluded their brief to the Supreme Court with a lengthy quotation from the Cohen/Griswold letter. This time, the Supreme Court ruled that the government must appoint attorneys for criminal defendants who cannot afford an attorney.

In 1944, Cohen became one of the drafters of the United Nations Charter at the Dumbarton Oaks Conference, where he worked alongside Charles W. Yost. In 1945, the two once more worked together at the Berlin Conference, on the Potsdam Agreement.

In 1948 Cohen advised both the United States and the new State of Israel with respect to the first official exchange between both countries. Cohen provided crucial advice and counsel to senators working for the passage of the Civil Rights Act of 1957. In 1967 Cohen testified in favor of a proposed United States Senate resolution that would have called upon President Johnson to request the United Nations consider proposals to end the Vietnam War.

Jordan A. Schwarz noted, "Although no government lawyer was as respected as Cohen, he never had a prominent position in government because of his palpable Jewishness."

== Personal life ==
Born in Muncie, Indiana on September 23, 1894, Cohen was considered to be humble and private; he never married.

Cohen was the uncle of Selma Jeanne Cohen, a prominent dance historian.

=== Characterizations ===
- "Cohen was known for his slouching posture, sloppy dress, absentminded table manners – and for a skill at drafting legislation that was generally reckoned the best in the United States."
- He "looked and talked, as a friend wrote, 'like a Dickens portrait of an absent-minded professor.'"

== Works ==
- Report on the Work of the United Nations Disarmament Commission (1953)
- The United Nations: Constitutional Developments, Growth, and Possibilities (Harvard University Press : 1961)
