= Felix Frankfurter =

American jurist (1882–1965)

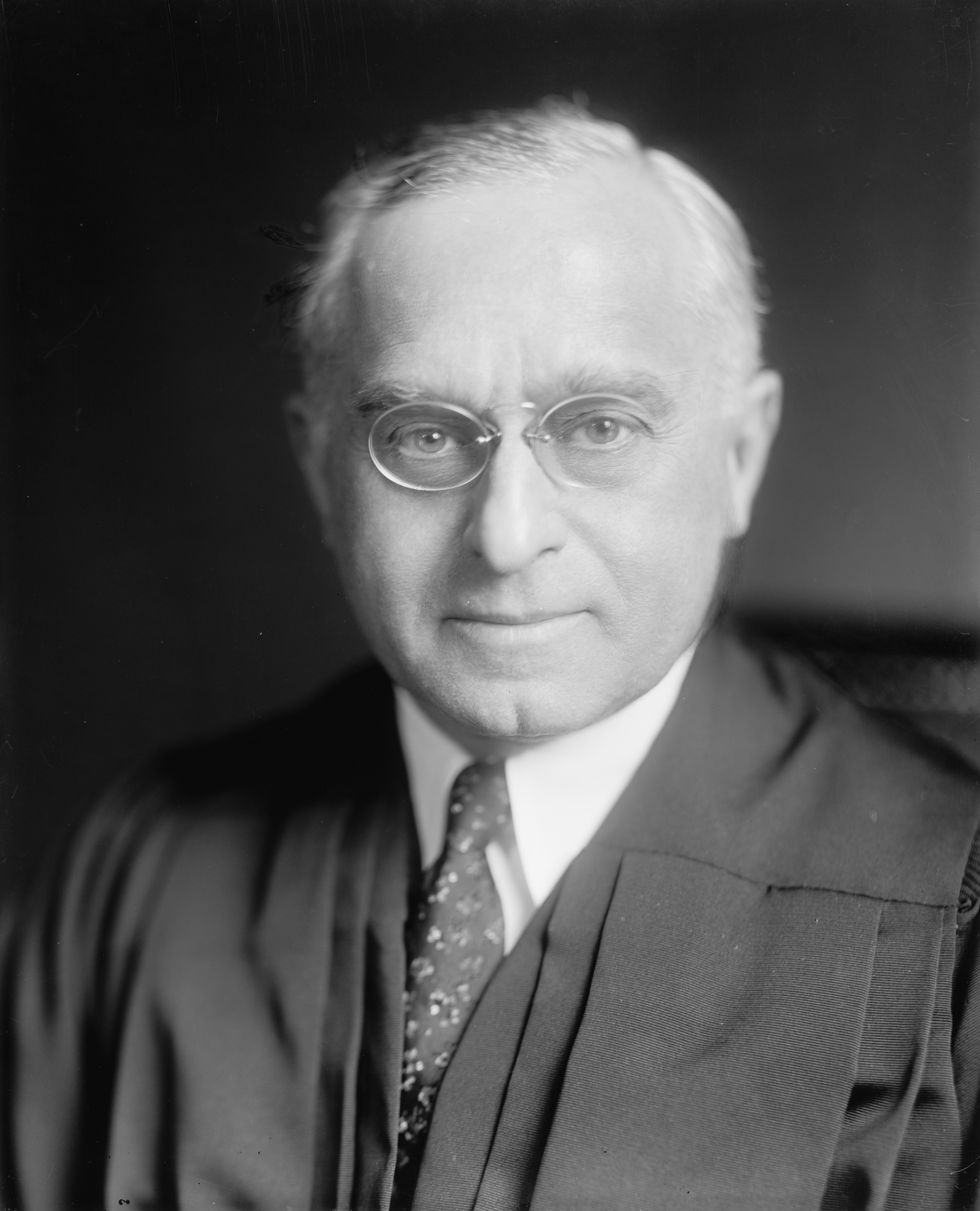
- Official portrait, 1939

Associate Justice of the Supreme Court of the United States
- In office January 30, 1939 – August 28, 1962
- Nominated by: Franklin D. Roosevelt
- Preceded by: Benjamin Cardozo
- Succeeded by: Arthur Goldberg

Personal details
- Born: November 15, 1882 Vienna, Austria-Hungary
- Died: February 22, 1965 (aged 82) Washington, D.C., U.S.
- Resting place: Mount Auburn Cemetery
- Spouse: Marion Denman (m. 1919)
- Education: City College of New York (BA); Harvard University (LLB)
- Awards: Presidential Medal of Freedom (1963)
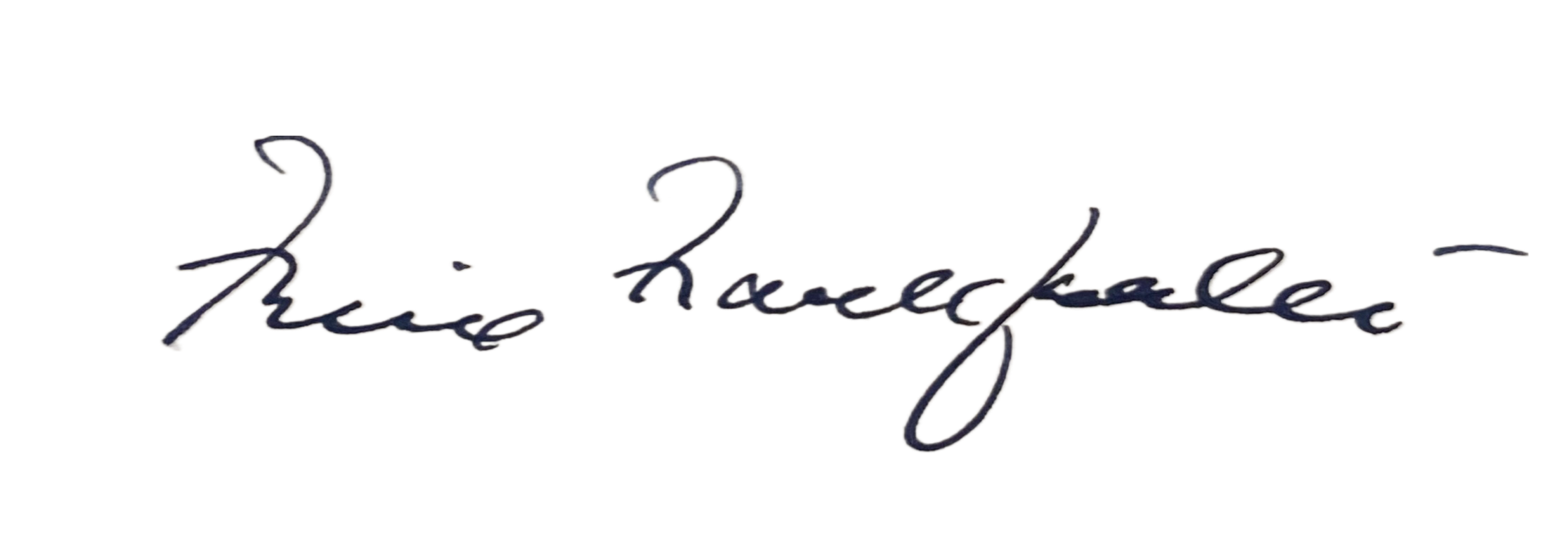
- Signature

Military service
- Allegiance: United States
- Branch/service: United States Army
- Years of service: 1917–1918
- Rank: Major
- Unit: United States Army Judge Advocate General's Corps
- Battles/wars: World War I

Felix Frankfurter (November 15, 1882 – February 22, 1965) was an American jurist who served as an associate justice of the U.S. Supreme Court from 1939 until 1962, advocating judicial restraint.

Born in Vienna, Frankfurter immigrated with his family to New York City at age 12. He graduated from Harvard Law School and worked for Henry L. Stimson, the U.S. Secretary of War. Frankfurter served as Judge Advocate General during World War I. Afterward, he returned to Harvard and helped found the American Civil Liberties Union. He later became a friend and adviser of President Franklin D. Roosevelt. After Benjamin N. Cardozo died in 1938, Roosevelt nominated Frankfurter to the Supreme Court. Given his affiliations and alleged radicalism, the Senate confirmed Frankfurter's appointment only after its Judiciary Committee required him to testify in 1939, a practice that became routine in the 1950s.

His relations with colleagues were strained by ideological and personal differences, likely exacerbated by some antisemitism. His judicial restraint was first seen as relatively liberal, as conservative justices had used the derogation canon and plain meaning rule against Progressive economic legislation during the 1897–1937 Lochner era. It became seen as somewhat conservative in civil liberties dissents as the Court moved left. His dissent in West Virginia State Board of Education v. Barnette (1943) refers to his minority-group background as immaterial and was prompted by the new majority's repudiation of Minersville School District v. Gobitis (1940), in which he had penned the restrained majority opinion.

In 1948, he hired William Thaddeus Coleman Jr., the first black law clerk at the Court, though in 1960 Frankfurter declined to hire Ruth Bader Ginsburg, citing gender roles. In Brown II (1955), he suggested the phrase "all deliberate speed" to endorse gradual racial integration. He held that redistricting was nonjusticiable in Colegrove v. Green (1946) and Baker v. Carr (1962), and his majority opinion in Gomillion v. Lightfoot (1960) only upheld review under the Fifteenth Amendment. Frankfurter's other decisions include the majority opinion in Beauharnais v. Illinois (1952) and dissents in Glasser v. United States (1942) and Trop v. Dulles (1958). He retired after a 1962 stroke, and was replaced with Arthur Goldberg.

== Early life and education ==
Frankfurter was born into an Ashkenazi Jewish family on November 15, 1882, in Vienna (then part of Austria-Hungary). He was the third of six children of Leopold Frankfurter, a merchant, and Emma (Winter) Frankfurter. His father died in 1916. His mother died in January 1928 after a prolonged illness. His uncle, Solomon Frankfurter, was head librarian at the Vienna University Library. Frankfurter's forebears had been rabbis for generations. In 1894, twelve-year-old Frankfurter and his family immigrated to the United States, settling in New York City's Lower East Side, a dense center of immigrants. Frankfurter attended P.S. 25 and Townsend Harris High School, where he excelled at his studies and enjoyed playing chess and shooting craps on the street. He spent many hours reading at The Cooper Union for the Advancement of Science and Art and attending political lectures, usually on subjects such as trade unionism, socialism, and communism.

After graduating in 1902 from City College of New York, where he was inducted into Phi Beta Kappa, Frankfurter worked for the Tenement House Department of New York City to raise money for law school. He applied successfully to Harvard Law School, where he excelled academically and socially. He became lifelong friends with Walter Lippmann and Horace Kallen, became an editor of the Harvard Law Review, and graduated first in his class with one of the best academic records since Louis Brandeis.

== Early career ==
Frankfurter's legal career began when he joined the New York law firm of Hornblower, Byrne, Miller & Potter in 1906. In the same year, he was hired as the assistant to Henry Stimson, the U.S. Attorney for the Southern District of New York. During this period, Frankfurter read Herbert Croly's book The Promise of American Life, and became a supporter of the New Nationalism and of Theodore Roosevelt.

In 1911, President William Howard Taft appointed Stimson as his Secretary of War, and Stimson appointed Frankfurter as law officer of the Bureau of Insular Affairs. Frankfurter worked directly for Stimson as his assistant and confidant. His government position restricted his ability to publicly voice his Progressive views, though he expressed his opinions privately to friends such as Judge Learned Hand. In 1912 Frankfurter supported the Bull Moose campaign to return Roosevelt to the presidency but was bitterly disappointed when Woodrow Wilson was elected. He became increasingly disillusioned with the established parties, and described himself as "politically homeless".

== First World War ==
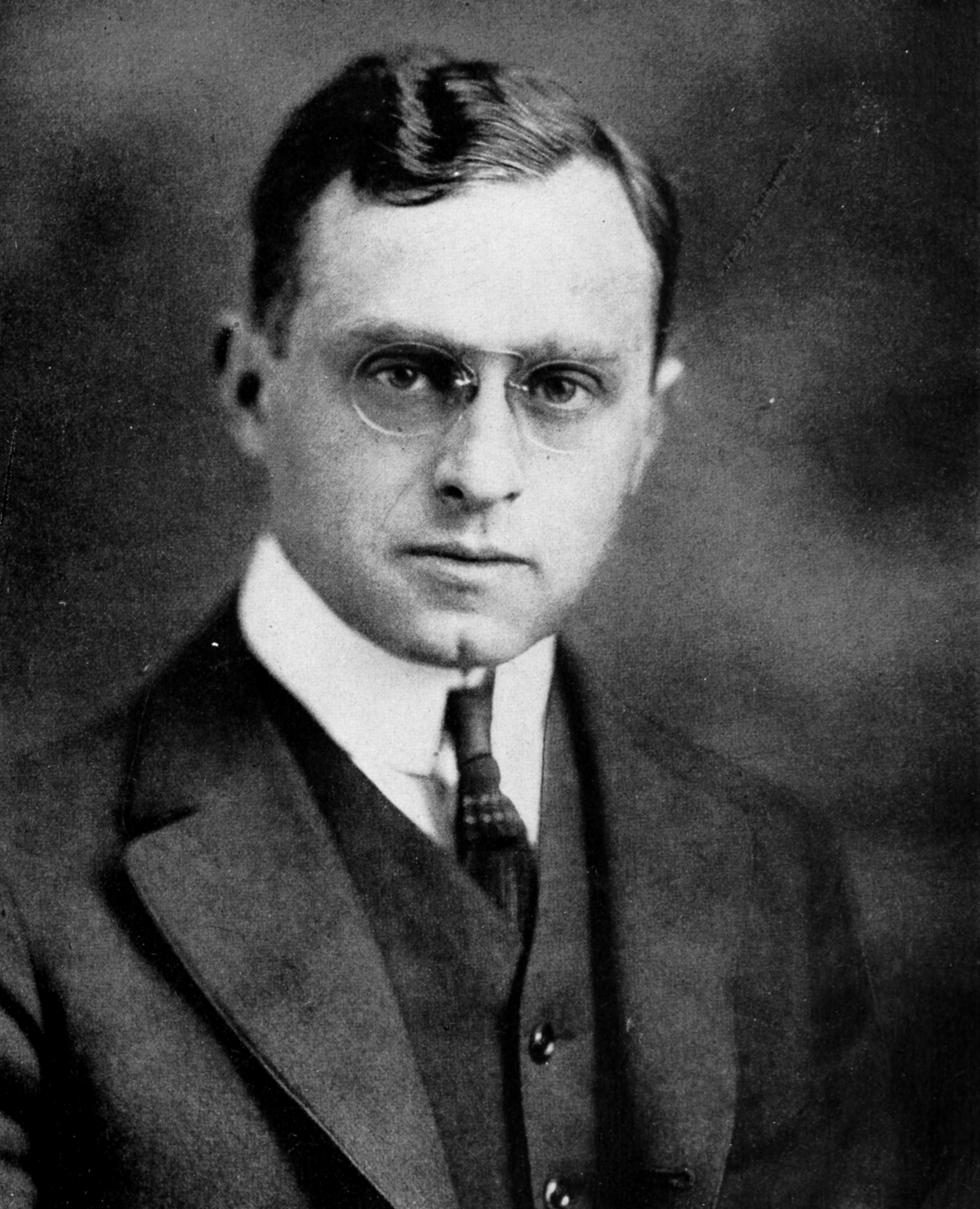
Portrait by Harris & Ewing c. 1918

Frankfurter's work in Washington had impressed the faculty at Harvard Law School, who used a donation from the financier Jacob Schiff to create a position for him there after Louis Brandeis suggested that Schiff do this. He taught mainly administrative law and occasionally criminal law. With fellow professor James M. Landis, he advocated judicial restraint in dealing with government misdeeds, including greater freedom for administrative agencies from judicial oversight. He also served as counsel for the National Consumers League, arguing for Progressive causes such as minimum wage and restricted work hours. He was involved in the early years of The New Republic magazine after its founding by Herbert Croly.

When the United States entered World War I in 1917, Frankfurter took a special leave from Harvard to be commissioned a major in the United States Army Reserve, where he supervised military courts-martial as a Judge Advocate General in 1917 and served as special assistant to the Secretary of War Newton D. Baker until 1918.

In September 1917, he was appointed counsel to a commission, the President's Mediation Committee, established by President Wilson to resolve major strikes threatening war production. Among the disturbances he investigated were the 1916 Preparedness Day Bombing in San Francisco, where he argued strongly that the radical leader Thomas Mooney had been framed and required a new trial. He also represented the Labor Department on the priorities board of the War Industries Board and examined the copper industry in Arizona. There, industry bosses solved industrial relations problems by having more than 1,000 strikers forcibly deported to New Mexico.

Frankfurter thus learned firsthand about labor politics and extremism, including anarchism, communism and revolutionary socialism. He came to sympathize with labor issues, arguing that "unsatisfactory, remediable social conditions, if unattended, give rise to radical movements far transcending the original impulse." His activities led the public to view him as a radical lawyer and supporter of radical principles. Former President Theodore Roosevelt accused him of being "engaged in excusing men precisely like the Bolsheviki in Russia".

== Post First World War ==
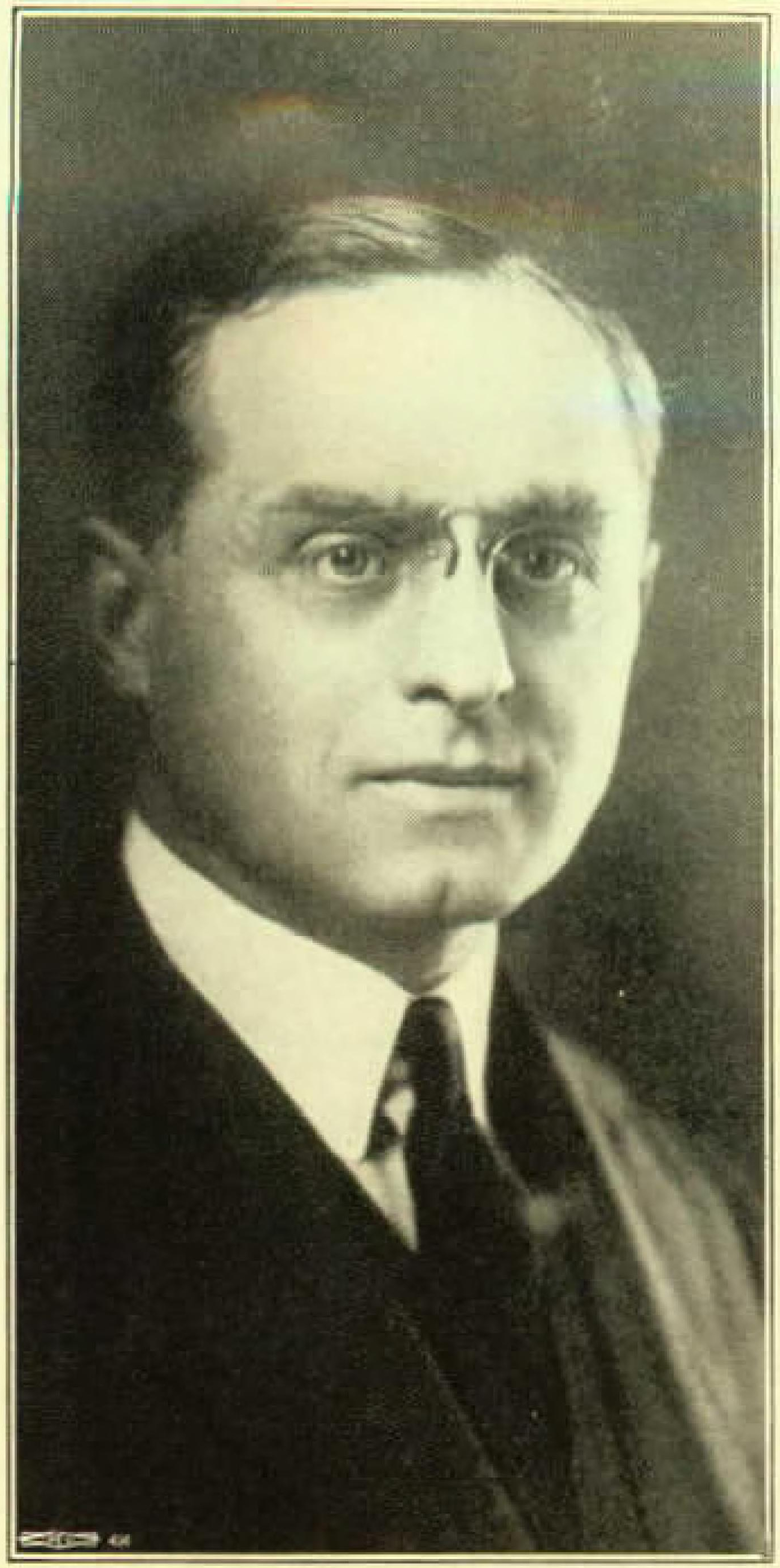
Frankfurter earlier in his career

As the war drew to a close, Frankfurter was among the nearly one hundred intellectuals who signed a statement of principles for the formation of the League of Free Nations Associations, intended to increase United States participation in international affairs.

Frankfurter was encouraged by Supreme Court Justice Louis Brandeis to become more involved in Zionism. With Brandeis, he lobbied President Wilson to support the Balfour Declaration, a British government statement supporting the establishment of a Jewish homeland in Palestine. In 1918, he participated in the founding conference of the American Jewish Congress in Philadelphia, creating a national democratic organization of Jewish leaders from all over the U.S. In 1919, Frankfurter served as a Zionist delegate to the Paris Peace Conference.

=== Marriage and family ===
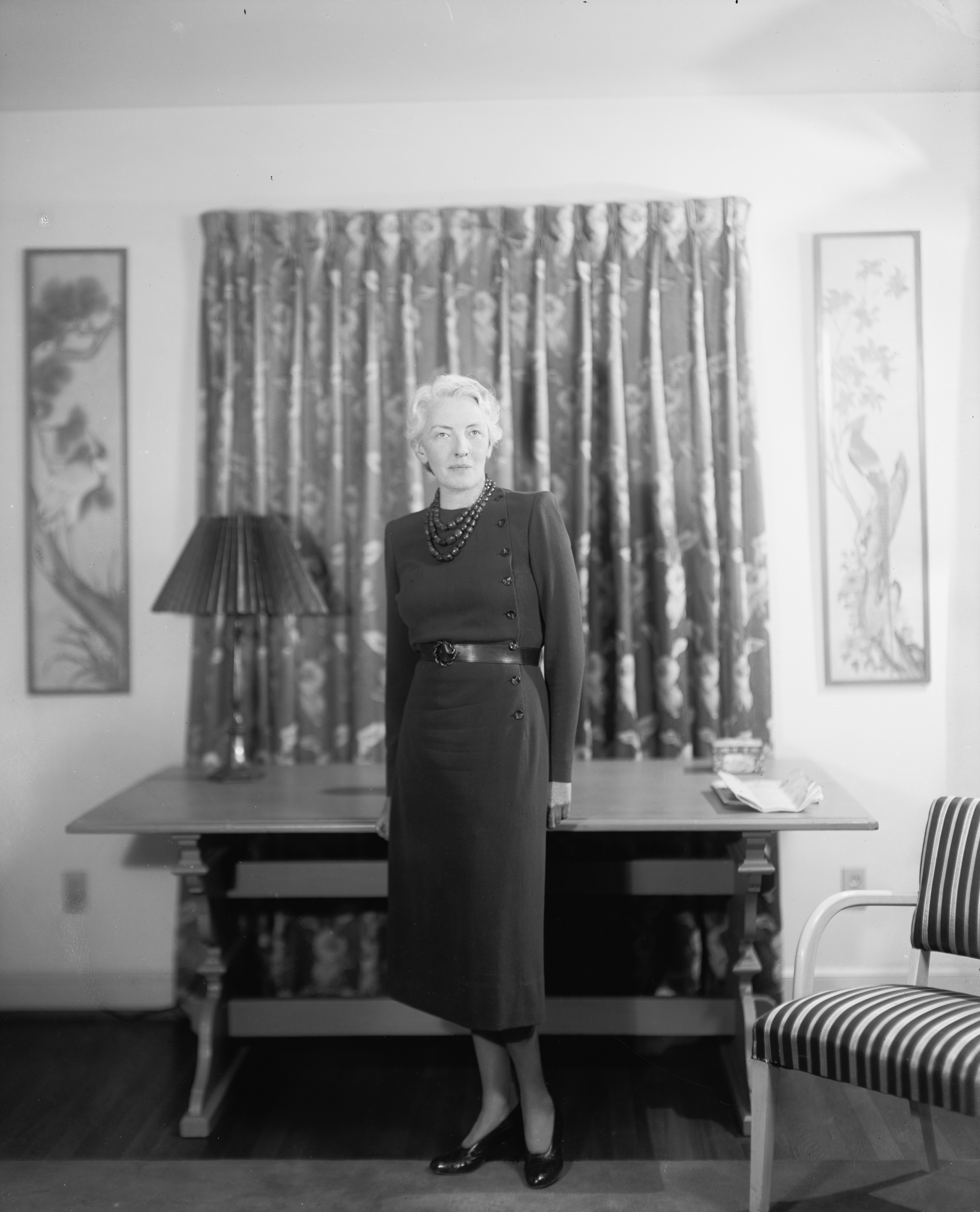
Frankfurter's wife Marion

In 1919, Frankfurter married Marion Denman, a Smith College graduate and the daughter of a Congregational minister. They married after a long and difficult courtship, and against the wishes of his mother, who was disturbed by the prospect of her son marrying outside the Jewish faith. Frankfurter was a non-practicing Jew and regarded religion as "an accident of birth". Frankfurter was a domineering husband and Denman suffered from frail health. She suffered frequent mental breakdowns. The couple had no children.

=== Founding ACLU ===
Frankfurter's activities continued to attract attention for their alleged radicalism. In November 1919, he chaired a meeting in support of American recognition of the newly created Soviet Union. In 1920, Frankfurter helped to found the American Civil Liberties Union. Following the arrest of suspected communist radicals in 1919 and 1920 in the Palmer raids, Frankfurter and other prominent lawyers such as Zechariah Chafee signed an ACLU report which condemned the "utterly illegal acts committed by those charged with the highest duty of enforcing the laws", noting entrapment, police brutality, prolonged incommunicado detention, and due process violations. Frankfurter and Chafee also submitted briefs to a habeas corpus application to the Massachusetts Federal District Court. Judge George W. Anderson ordered the discharge of twenty aliens, and his denunciation of the raids effectively ended them. J. Edgar Hoover began following Frankfurter as "the most dangerous man in the United States", a "disseminator of Bolshevik propaganda".

In 1921, Frankfurter was given a chair at Harvard Law School, where he continued Progressive work on behalf of socialists and labor, as well as minorities. When A. Lawrence Lowell, the President of Harvard University, proposed to limit the enrollment of Jewish students, Frankfurter worked with others to defeat the plan.

In the late 1920s, he attracted public attention when he supported calls for a new trial for Sacco and Vanzetti, two Italian immigrant anarchists who had been sentenced to death on robbery and murder charges. Frankfurter wrote an influential article for The Atlantic Monthly and subsequently a book, The Case of Sacco and Vanzetti: A Critical Analysis for Lawyers and Laymen. He critiqued the prosecution's case and the judge's handling of the trial; he asserted that the convictions were the result of anti-immigrant prejudice and enduring anti-radical hysteria of the Red Scare of 1919–20. His activities further isolated him from his Harvard colleagues and from Boston society.

== Advisor to President Roosevelt ==
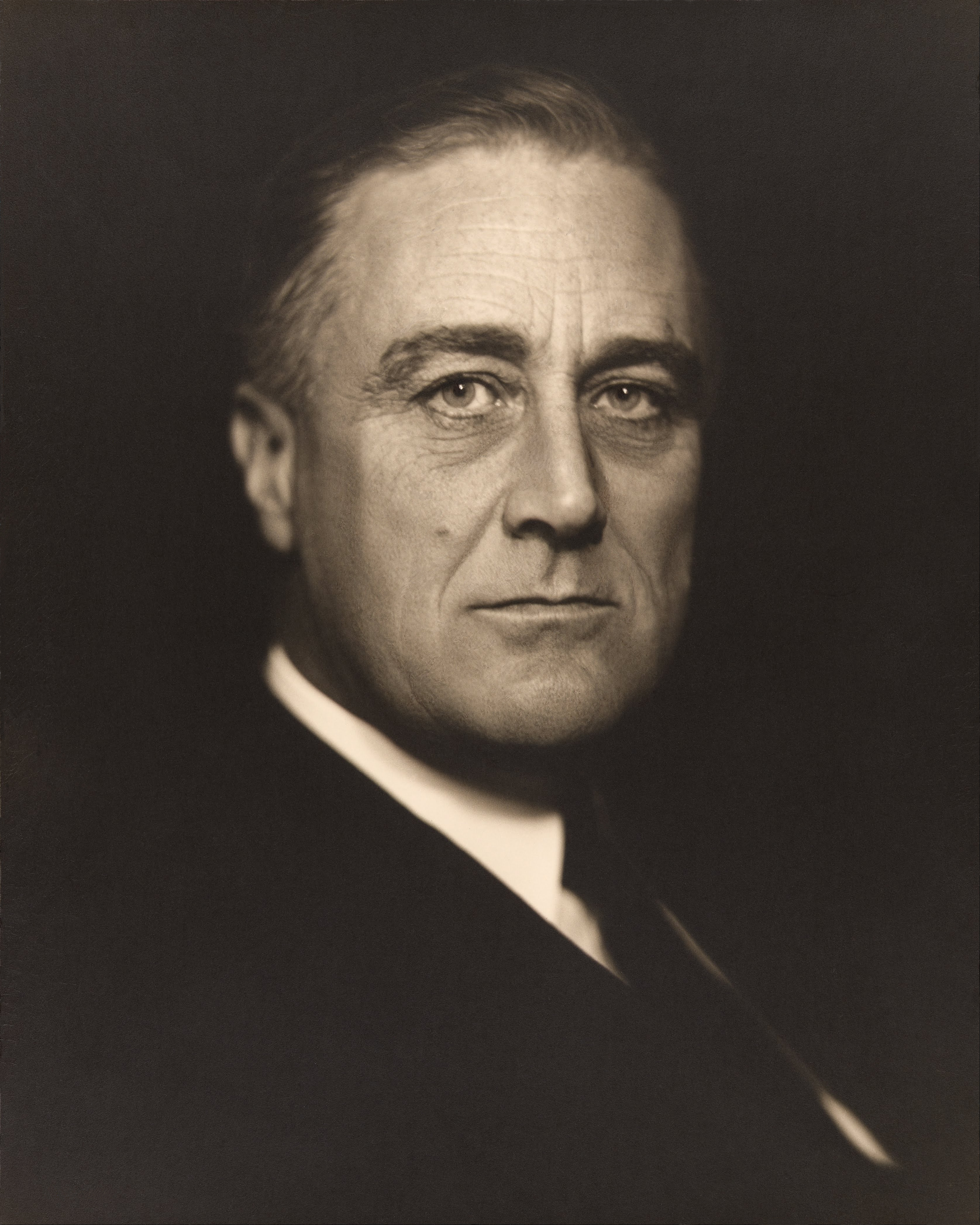
Franklin Roosevelt in the early 1930s

Following the inauguration of Franklin D. Roosevelt in 1933, Frankfurter quickly became a trusted and loyal adviser to the new president. Frankfurter was considered to be liberal and advocated progressive legislation. He argued against the economic plans of Raymond Moley, Adolf Berle and Rexford Tugwell, while recognizing the need for major changes to deal with the Great Depression.

Frankfurter successfully recommended many bright young lawyers toward public service with the New Deal administration; they became known as "Felix's Happy Hot Dogs". Among the most notable of these were Thomas Corcoran, Donald Hiss and Alger Hiss, and Benjamin Cohen. He moved to Washington, D.C., commuting back to Harvard for classes, but felt that he was never fully accepted within government circles. He worked closely with Louis Brandeis, lobbying for political activities suggested by Brandeis. He declined a seat on the Supreme Judicial Court of Massachusetts and, in 1933, the position of Solicitor General of the United States. Long an anglophile, Frankfurter had studied at Oxford University in 1920. In 1933–34, he returned to act as visiting Eastman professor in the faculty of Law.

A 1935 newspaper article describes the Happy Hot Dogs as:

- Dean Acheson, Undersecretary of the Treasury
- Thomas Gardiner Corcoran, legal staff member of the Public Works Administration
- James M. Landis, head of the Securities and Exchange Commission
- Alger Hiss, "right hand man" of Solicitor General Stanley Forman Reed, U.S. Department of Justice
- Paul Freund, also legal staff member of the U.S. Department of Justice

Other "Frankfurter men" in the New Deal included:

- Benjamin V. Cohen, legal staff member of the Public Works Administration
- Jerome Frank, counsel to Reconstruction Finance Corporation, former general counsel of the Agricultural Adjustment Administration
- Charles Wyzanski, solicitor of the U.S. Department of Labor
- Thomas H. Eliot, general counsel for the new social security organization (Social Security Administration)
- Gardner Jackson, formerly assistant consumers' counsel of the Agricultural Adjustment Administration

Even after his appointment to the Supreme Court, Frankfurter remained close to Roosevelt. In July 1943, on behalf of the President, Frankfurter interviewed Jan Karski, a member of the Polish resistance who had been smuggled into the Warsaw ghetto and a camp near the Belzec death camp in 1942, in order to report back on what is now known as the Holocaust. Frankfurter greeted Karski's report with skepticism, later explaining: "I did not say that he was lying, I said that I could not believe him. There is a difference."

== Supreme Court justice ==
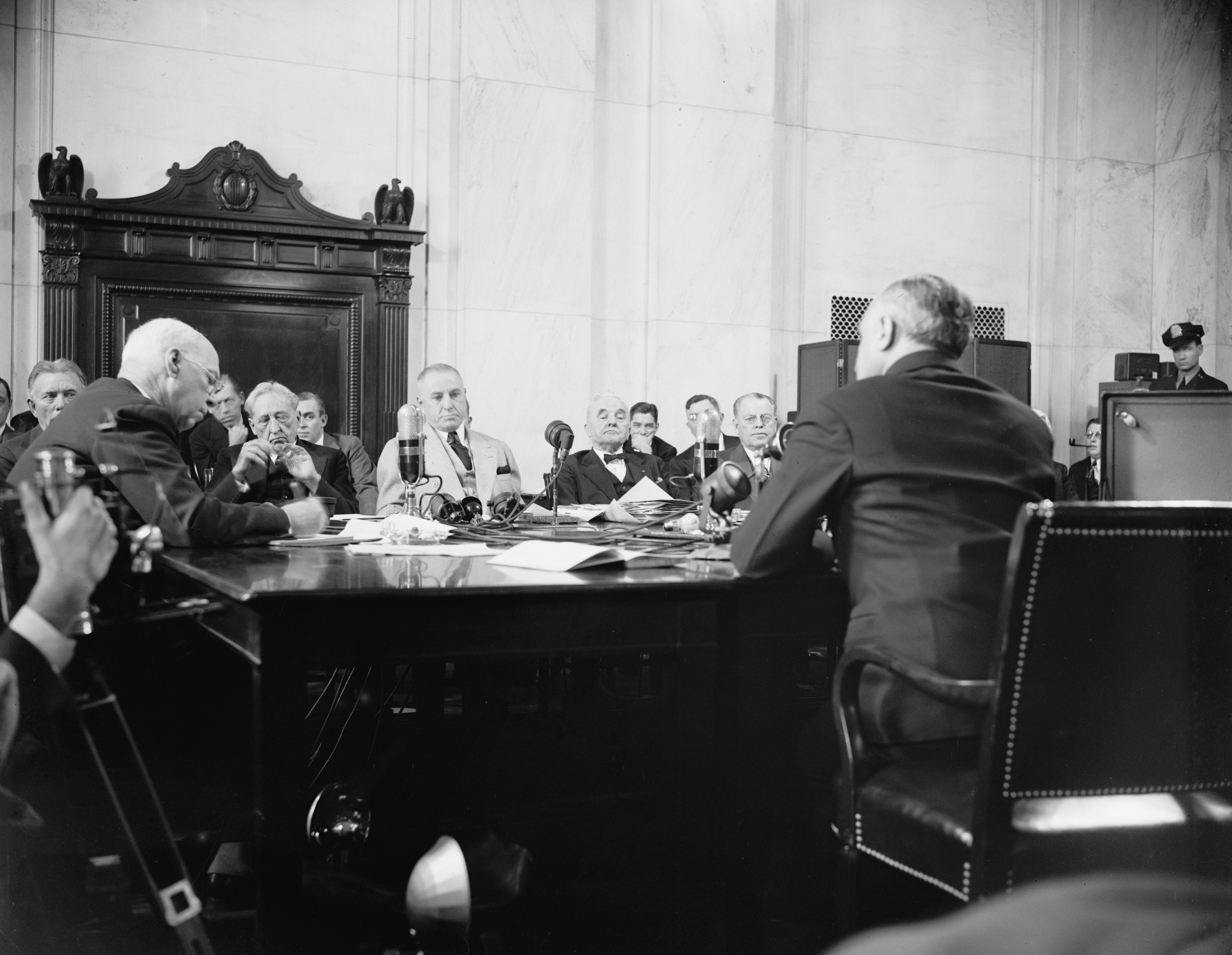
Frankfurter (right, back turned) testifies before the Senate Judiciary Committee during the hearings on his nomination to be an associate Justice of the Supreme Court, January 12, 1939

Following the death of Supreme Court associate justice Benjamin N. Cardozo in July 1938, President Roosevelt turned to Frankfurter for recommendations of prospective candidates to fill the vacancy. Finding none on the list to suit his criteria, Roosevelt nominated Frankfurter. Frankfurter's nomination quickly became highly controversial, and a number of witnesses gave testimony in opposing the nomination during the confirmation hearing before the Senate Judiciary Committee. In addition to the objection that he was considered to be the president's unofficial advisor, that he was affiliated with special interest groups, that there were now no justices from west of the Mississippi, opponents pointed to Frankfurter as foreign-born and deemed to be affiliated with an anti-Christian movement viewed as part of a broader Communist infiltration into the country. As a result, the Judiciary Committee requested that Frankfurter appear before it and answer questions from the committee. He agreed, but only to address what he considered to be slanderous allegations against him. He was only the second Supreme Court nominee ever to testify during hearings on their nomination (the first was Harlan F. Stone in 1924), and the first to be requested to do so. Even so, he was confirmed by the U.S. Senate by voice vote on January 17, 1939.

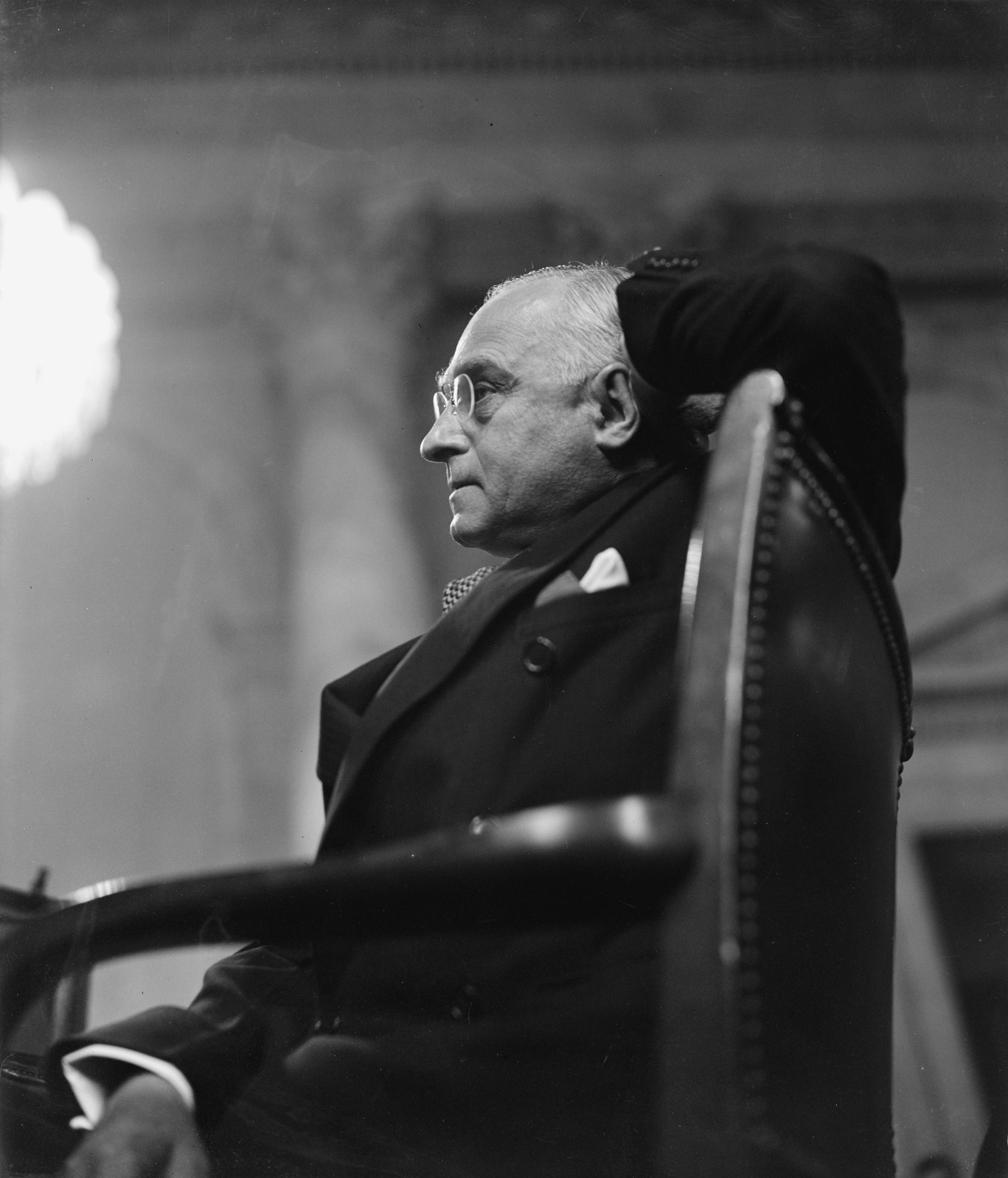
Frankfurter at the Senate Judiciary Committee hearings, January 12, 1939

Frankfurter served from January 30, 1939, to August 28, 1962. He wrote 247 opinions for the Court, 132 concurring opinions, and 251 dissents. He became the court's most outspoken advocate of judicial restraint, the view that courts should not interpret the Constitution in such a way as to impose sharp limits upon the authority of the legislative and executive branches. He also usually refused to apply the federal Constitution to the states. In the case of Irvin v. Dowd, Frankfurter stated what was for him a frequent theme: "The federal judiciary has no power to sit in judgment upon a determination of a state court ... Something that thus goes to the very structure of our federal system in its distribution of power between the United States and the state is not a mere bit of red tape to be cut, on the assumption that this Court has general discretion to see justice done".

In his judicial restraint philosophy, Frankfurter was strongly influenced by his close friend and mentor Oliver Wendell Holmes Jr., who had taken a firm stand during his tenure on the bench against the doctrine of "economic due process". Frankfurter revered Justice Holmes, often citing Holmes in his opinions. In practice, this meant Frankfurter was generally willing to uphold the actions of those branches against constitutional challenges so long as they did not "shock the conscience". Frankfurter was particularly well known as a scholar of civil procedure.

Frankfurter's adherence to the judicial restraint philosophy was shown in the 1940 opinion he wrote for the court in Minersville School District v. Gobitis, a case involving Jehovah's Witnesses students who had been expelled from school due to their refusal to salute the flag and recite the Pledge of Allegiance. He rejected claims that First Amendment rights should be protected by law, and urged deference to the decisions of the elected school board officials. He stated that religious belief "does not relieve the citizen from the discharge of political responsibilities" and that exempting the children from the flag-saluting ceremony "might cast doubts in the minds of other children" and reduce their loyalty to the nation. Justice Harlan Fiske Stone issued a lone dissent.

The court's decision was followed by hundreds of violent attacks on Jehovah's Witnesses throughout the country. It was overturned in March 1943 by the Supreme Court decision in West Virginia Board of Education v. Barnette. A frequent ally, Justice Robert H. Jackson, wrote the majority opinion in this case, which reversed the decision only three years prior in poetic passionate terms as a fundamental constitutional principle, that no government authority has the right to define official dogma and require its affirmation by citizens. Frankfurter's extensive dissent began by raising and then rejecting the notion that as a Jew, he ought "to particularly protect minorities," although he did say that his personal political sympathies were with the majority opinion. He reiterated his view that the role of the Court was not to give an opinion of the "wisdom or evil of a law" but only to determine "whether legislators could in reason have enacted such a law".

In Baker v. Carr, Frankfurter's position was that the federal courts did not have the right to tell sovereign state governments how to apportion their legislatures; he thought the Supreme Court should not get involved in political questions, whether federal or local. Frankfurter's view had won out in the 1946 case preceding Baker, Colegrove v. Green – there, a 4–3 majority decided that the case was non-justiciable, and the federal courts had no right to become involved in state politics, no matter how unequal district populations had become. But, in the Baker case, the majority of justices ruled to settle the matter – saying that the drawing of state legislative districts was within the purview of federal judges, despite Frankfurter's warnings that the Court should avoid entering "the political thicket".

Frankfurter had previously articulated a similar view in a concurring opinion written for Dennis v. United States (1951). The decision affirmed, by a 6–2 margin, the conviction of eleven Communist leaders for conspiring to overthrow the US Government under the Smith Act. In it, he again argued that judges "are not legislators, that direct policy-making is not our province." He recognized that curtailing the free speech of those who advocate the overthrow of government by force also risked stifling criticism by those who did not, writing that "[it] is a sobering fact that in sustaining the convictions before us we can hardly escape restriction on the interchange of ideas."

A pivotal school desegregation case came before the court in Brown v. Board of Education. The case was scheduled for re-argument when Chief Justice Fred M. Vinson, whose crucial vote appeared to be opposed to overruling the pro-segregation precedent in Plessy v. Ferguson, died before the court's decision was made. Frankfurter reportedly remarked that Vinson's death was the first solid piece of evidence he had seen to prove the existence of God, though some believe the story to be "possibly apocryphal".

Frankfurter demanded that the opinion in Brown II (1955) order schools to desegregate with "all deliberate speed". Some school boards used this phrase as an excuse to defy the demands of the first Brown decision. For fifteen years, schools in many states of the South remained segregated; in some cases systems closed their schools, and new private schools were opened by white parents for their children. In Alexander v. Holmes County Board of Education, the Court wrote, "The obligation of every school district is to terminate dual school systems at once and to operate now and hereafter only unitary schools." Frankfurter's "all deliberate speed" formula was intended to constrain the federal judiciary toward a gradualist approach to school integration, but his formula backfired. By divorcing the plaintiff's injury from the remedy afforded, Brown II gave birth to modern Public Law Litigation, which today affords federal courts broad power to reform state institutions.

Frankfurter was hands-off in the area of business. In the 1956 government case against DuPont, started because DuPont seemed to have maneuvered its way into a preferential relationship with GM, Frankfurter refused to find a conspiracy, and said the Court had no right to interfere with the progress of business. Here again, Frankfurter opposed – and lost out to – the views of the court majority made up of Justices Warren, Black, Douglas and Brennan. Later in his career, Frankfurter's judicial restraint philosophy frequently put him on the dissenting side of ground-breaking decisions taken by the Warren Court to end discrimination.

Frankfurter believed that the authority of the Supreme Court would be reduced if it went too strongly against public opinion: he sometimes went to great lengths to avoid unpopular decisions, including fighting to delay court decisions against laws prohibiting racial intermarriage.

For the October 1948 court term, Frankfurter hired William Thaddeus Coleman Jr., the first African American to serve as a Supreme Court law clerk.

In 1960, despite a recommendation from the dean of Harvard Law School, Frankfurter turned down Ruth Bader Ginsburg for a clerkship position because of her gender. She later became an associate justice of the Supreme Court herself, and was the first Jewish woman to do so.

Frankfurter's specific seat later came to be informally known as the "Jewish seat," as between 1932 and 1969 it was occupied by four consecutive Jewish justices: Cardozo, Frankfurter, Goldberg, and Abe Fortas. From 1994 to 2022, the seat was occupied by Stephen G. Breyer, who is also Jewish.

== Relationships with fellow justices ==
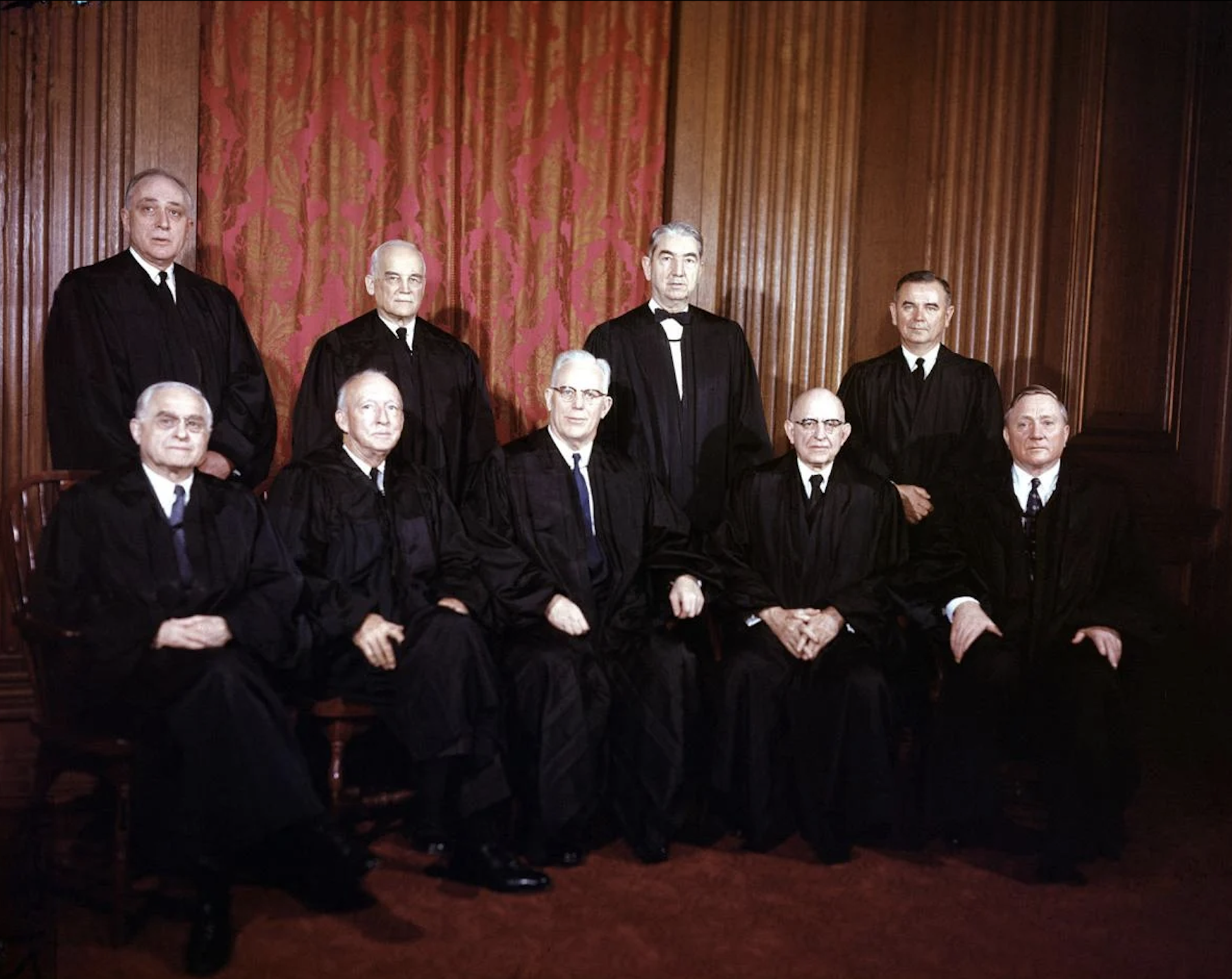
Frankfurter (seated, far left) on the Warren Court, November 5, 1956

Frankfurter generally attempted to influence any new justice and succeeded with many, including Tom C. Clark, Harold Hitz Burton, Charles Evans Whittaker, and Sherman Minton. But William J. Brennan Jr. resisted after some initial ambivalence, and Frankfurter turned against Brennan after Irvin v. Dowd. Other justices who received the Frankfurter treatment of flattery and instruction were Burton, Fred M. Vinson, and John Marshall Harlan II. With Vinson, who became Chief Justice, Frankfurter feigned deference but sought influence. Some (possibly apocryphal) reports have Frankfurter remarking that Vinson's death in 1953 was the first solid piece of evidence he had seen to prove the existence of God.

Feuding with liberal colleagues Hugo Black and William O. Douglas, Frankfurter became seen as a conservative figure. He criticized them for starting "with a result" and producing "shoddy," "result-oriented," and "demagogic" work. He even panned the work of Chief Justice Earl Warren as "dishonest nonsense". Frankfurter increasingly saw colleagues, including Frank Murphy and Wiley Blount Rutledge, as part of a liberal "Axis" opposed to judicial restraint. Led by Black, they agreed that the Fourteenth Amendment entailed Bill of Rights protections, shaping Warren Court decisions. Frankfurter feared this incorporation theory usurped state control of criminal justice, limiting innovation in due process.

Colleagues disliked Frankfurter's argumentative style. "All [he] does is talk, talk, talk," Warren complained. "He drives you crazy." According to Black, "I thought Felix was going to hit me today, he got so mad." In the Court's biweekly conference sessions, traditionally a period for vote-counting, Frankfurter habitually lectured his colleagues for forty-five or more minutes at a time, with his book resting on a podium. In turn, his opponents would read their mail or leave the room.

Frankfurter was close friends with Justice Robert H. Jackson. The two exchanged much correspondence over their mutual dislike for Justice William O. Douglas. Frankfurter also had a strong influence over Jackson's opinions.

Frankfurter was universally praised for his work before coming to the Supreme Court, and was expected to influence it for decades past the death of FDR. However, Frankfurter's influence over other justices was limited by his failure to adapt to new surroundings, his style of personal relations (relying heavily on the use of flattery and ingratiation, which ultimately proved divisive), and his strict adherence to the ideology of judicial restraint. Michael E. Parrish, professor at UCSD, said of Frankfurter: "History has not been kind to [him] ... there is now almost a universal consensus that Frankfurter the justice was a failure, a judge who ... became 'uncoupled from the locomotive of history' during the Second World War, and who thereafter left little in the way of an enduring jurisprudential legacy."

== Retirement and death ==
Frankfurter retired in 1962, after suffering a stroke and was succeeded by Arthur Goldberg. The former justice was awarded the Presidential Medal of Freedom by President John F. Kennedy in 1963. Frankfurter died from congestive heart failure in 1965 at the age of 82. His remains are interred in Mount Auburn Cemetery in Cambridge, Massachusetts.

== Legacy ==
There are two extensive collections of Frankfurter's papers: one at the Manuscript Division of the Library of Congress and the other at Harvard University. Both are fully open for research and have been distributed to other libraries on microfilm. However, in 1972 it was discovered that more than a thousand pages of his archives, including his correspondence with Lyndon B. Johnson and others, had been stolen from the Library of Congress; the crime remains unsolved and the perpetrator and motive are unknown.

Frankfurter was elected to the American Academy of Arts and Sciences in 1932 and the American Philosophical Society in 1939.

== Writings ==
Books

- The Case of Sacco and Vanzetti: A Critical Analysis for Lawyers and Laymen (1927)
- The Business of the Supreme Court: A Study in the Federal Judicial System (1928)
- Mr. Justice Holmes and the Supreme Court (1938)
- Felix Frankfurter Reminisces (1960); memoir (recorded in talks with H.B. Phillips)

Articles

- Frankfurter, Felix, and James M. Landis (1925). "The Compact Clause of the Constitution: A Study in Interstate Adjustments." Yale Law Journal 34, No. 7: 685–758.
- Felix Frankfurter, Nothan Green. 1930. Labor Injunction. Macmillan.
- Frankfurter, Felix (1931). "Mr. Justice Holmes and the Constitution: A Review of His Twenty-five Years on the Supreme Court". Frankfurter, Felix, ed. Mr. Justice Holmes. New York: Coward-McCann, Inc., pp. 46–118.

== See also ==
- Demographics of the Supreme Court of the United States
- List of justices of the Supreme Court of the United States
- List of law clerks for the second seat of the Supreme Court of the United States
- List of United States Supreme Court justices by time in office
- United States Supreme Court cases during the Hughes Court
- United States Supreme Court cases during the Stone Court
- United States Supreme Court cases during the Vinson Court
- United States Supreme Court cases during the Warren Court

Legal offices
Preceded by Benjamin Cardozo	Associate Justice of the Supreme Court of the United States; 1939–1962	Succeeded by Arthur Goldberg
