= The Business of the Supreme Court =

Book about the U.S. Supreme Court

The Business of the Supreme Court: A Study in the Federal Judicial System
- Authors: Felix Frankfurter & James M. Landis
- Language: English
- Subject: Law
- Genre: Non-fiction
- Publisher: Routledge
- Publication date: October 15, 2006
- Publication place: United States
- Media type: Print
- ISBN: 978-1412806121

The Business of the Supreme Court: A Study in the Federal Judicial System (1928) is a book written by Felix Frankfurter (future U.S. Supreme Court justice) and his former student James McCauley Landis.

== Contents ==
The book is a collection of law review articles written by Felix Frankfurter between 1925-26, with the first essay co-written with James M. Landis, who was later to become the Dean of Harvard Law School (see Bibliography below for list of individual articles compiled).

== Bibliography ==
The book was a collection of the following articles from the Harvard Law Review:

- Felix Frankfurter & James M. Landis, The Business of the Supreme Court of the United States—A Study in the Federal Judicial System, 38 Harv. L. Rev. 1005 (1925).
- Felix Frankfurter, The Business of the Supreme Court of the United States—A Study in the Federal Judicial System, 39 Harv. L. Rev. 35 (1925).
- Felix Frankfurter, The Business of the Supreme Court of the United States—A Study in the Federal Judicial System, 39 Harv. L. Rev. 325 (1926).
- Felix Frankfurter, The Business of the Supreme Court of the United States—A Study in the Federal Judicial System, 39 Harv. L. Rev. 587 (1926).
- Felix Frankfurter, The Business of the Supreme Court of the United States—A Study in the Federal Judicial System, 39 Harv. L. Rev. 1046 (1926).
