= Company for Henry =

1967 novel by P. G. Wodehouse

- First edition (US)
- Author: P. G. Wodehouse
- Language: English
- Genre: Comic novel
- Publisher: Simon & Schuster, Inc. (US); Barrie & Jenkins (UK)
- Publication date: 12 May 1967 (US); 26 October 1967 (UK)
- Publication place: United States
- Media type: Print

Company For Henry is a novel by P. G. Wodehouse, first published in the United States on 12 May 1967 by Simon & Schuster, Inc., New York, under the title The Purloined Paperweight, and in the United Kingdom on 26 October 1967 by Barrie & Jenkins, London.

The story is a light-hearted tale of romance and intrigue among impoverished aristocrats, former musical performers, and American millionaires, set at a country house, Ashby Hall.

The heroine Jane Martyn's brother Algy had previously appeared in Jill the Reckless (1920), and her fiancé Lionel Green and his business partner Orlo Tarvin in Money in the Bank (1942). The butler at Ashby Hall, Ferris, appears to be the same Ferris in The Small Bachelor (1927).

== Plot ==
Henry Paradene, a retired musical comedy actor, has inherited a large country house he can hardly afford to maintain, Ashby Hall near the town of Ashby Paradene in Sussex. Henry's niece Jane Martyn, a secretary for the UK office of Newsweek, is spending the summer with him. Jane's brother Algernon “Algy” Martyn does not work and spends his time coming up with money-making schemes. Henry does not allow Algy at Ashby Hall (since Algy is eager to ask Henry for loans), so Algy lives off his friend Thomas “Bill” Hardy in Valley Fields. On her way to see Algy, Jane asks Bill to help a cat out of a tree, and Bill falls in love with her. Later, Jane has lunch with her fiancé Lionel Green, an interior decorator and antique furniture salesman, after six months of being apart, but Lionel is not enthusiastic to see her and annoys her by bringing his business partner Orlo Tarvin to join them.

A wealthy American named J. Wendell Stickney lives in New York with his widowed aunt by marriage, former chorus girl Kelly Stickney. A distant relative of Henry Paradene, Wendell takes pride in being part of the Paradene family. Henry hopes to sell his house to Wendell, and has Wendell and Kelly visit. Algy is visited by a broker's man named Clarence Binstead who works for the firm Duff and Trotter (a company from Quick Service and Money in the Bank). Algy owes the company for alcoholic drinks, and Binstead's presence puts pressure on Algy to pay his debt. Bill goes to Ashby Paradene in the hope of seeing Jane and meets her again; she learns that, under the pen name Adela Bristow, he wrote a thriller novel both she and her uncle enjoyed reading, Deadly Ernest.

Wendell, a collector of French eighteenth-century paperweights, covets one such paperweight kept in Ashby Hall. Henry would like to sell it but legally cannot, since it is an entailed family heirloom (though it seems Henry can legally sell Ashby Hall). Kelly suggests Wendell buy the paperweight from Bill and have Bill pretend it was stolen. She takes the paperweight and gives it to Wendell to mail to New York, but Wendell fears being caught as a thief when he sees Bill, mistakenly believing that Bill is a detective for the trustees ("some legal firm or other", according to Henry) of the entail. Wendell is too nervous to mail the paperweight, but fears Henry will change his mind about selling it, and so will not let anyone else mail it for him. Henry wants to marry Kelly; he eventually tells her that he wishes to sell the house to Wendell in order to have enough money to marry her, and she agrees to marry him anyway. Algy wants money to buy a house in Valley Fields and sell it to a company that desires the land for a block of flats, and decides to seek a loan from Wendell. Bill is disheartened to learn that Jane is engaged; however, this engagement ends, as Jane learns from Orlo Tarvin that Lionel is engaged to a millionaire's daughter and did not have the nerve to tell her.

Jane has discovered the paperweight is missing and believes Wendell stole it; hoping to get near Wendell to ask for a loan, Algy offers to steal the paperweight back for her (though this does not occur, as Henry later admits the scheme to Algy). Algy also tells Jane that Bill loves her. Bill gets a letter from his New York literary agent saying that Deadly Earnest has become successful and suggests Bill go to New York for his career. Wendell decides to put the paperweight in a safe deposit box at his bank, but he sees Bill again and loses his nerve. Like Algy, Henry owes money to Duff and Trotter, and the company's broker's man Binstead is sent to Ashby Hall. An ex-fiancée of Binstead's works at the house, so he agrees, at Algy's suggestion, to have Bill, who wants an excuse to be near Jane, go in his place and pretend to be the broker's man. Wendell finally puts the paperweight in a safe deposit box in his bank, and, still thinking Bill is a detective, pays him a bribe through Algy. Algy now has the money he needs to invest in the Valley Fields house. Wendell plans to buy Ashby Hall, and Bill and Jane get engaged and intend to live in America.

== Publication history ==
A condensed version of the story was published in two parts in the Canadian magazine Star Weekly, a weekend supplement of the Toronto Star, under the title The Purloined Paperweight. The first part was published on 29 April 1967, and the second on 6 May 1967.

Wodehouse dedicated the US edition: "To Peter Schwed, best of publishers". Peter Schwed worked for the book's US publishers, Simon & Schuster.
