= The Small Bachelor (film) =

1927 film directed by William A. Seiter

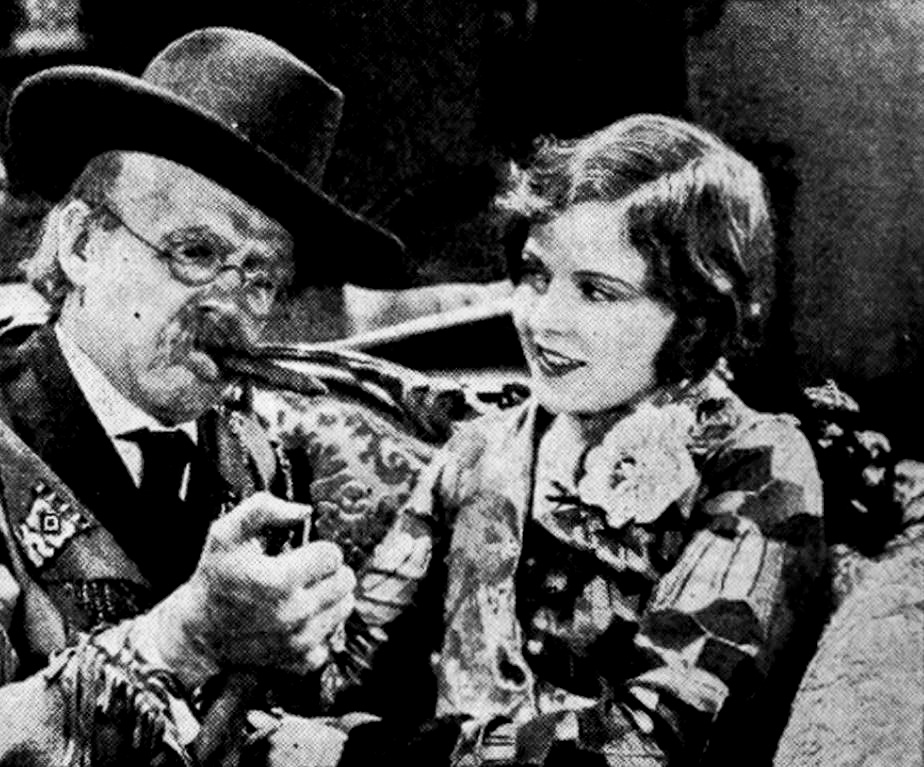
- Still with Littlefield and Kent
- Directed by: William A. Seiter
- Screenplay by: John B. Clymer; Rex Taylor; Walter Anthony
- Based on: The Small Bachelor by P. G. Wodehouse
- Starring: Barbara Kent; George Beranger; William Austin
- Cinematography: Arthur L. Todd
- Production company: Universal Pictures
- Distributed by: Universal Pictures
- Release date: November 6, 1927
- Running time: 7 reels
- Country: United States
- Language: Silent (English intertitles)

The Small Bachelor is a 1927 American silent comedy film directed by William A. Seiter and written by John B. Clymer, Rex Taylor and Walter Anthony. It is based on the 1927 novel The Small Bachelor by P. G. Wodehouse. The film stars Barbara Kent, George Beranger, and William Austin. The film was released on November 6, 1927, by Universal Pictures. Carl Laemmle was the film's presenter.

== Plot ==
As described in a film magazine, Finch, a wealthy but bashful young artist, falls in love with Molly Waddington and follows her around for several days without having the courage to speak to her. One day her Pomeranian dog breaks loose from her and Finch rescues him and is invited to her home. There he sees Molly's mother, a socially ambitious matron, laying down the law to her husband because he insists on reading wild west novels and pretends that he is a death-defying cowboy. Molly's mother ejects Finch from the house because she does not think him a suitable match for her daughter, preferring instead that Molly pay attention to Algernon Chubb, a worthless young peer seeking a rich marriage. Finch prevails upon his good friend J. Hamilton Beamish, an efficiency expert, to smooth the path for him. Beamish impresses upon him the futility of love but goes with him to the Waddington household and explains that Finch is not a fortune hunter. Mrs. Waddington grudging consents to the wedding, but immediately plans with Chubb to break it up. The day of the wedding arrives and, just as the ceremony is about to be performed, a notorious woman named Fanny steps up and claims that Finch is her husband. Molly calls off the wedding and goes to her room in tears. Finch returns to his roof garden bungalow where he finds Fanny, who tells him that she is really engaged to his valet Mullett and had broken up the wedding at the instigation of Mrs. Waddington. Meanwhile, Beamish, who has fallen in love with Molly's friend Eulalia, manages to explain to Molly his suspicion that some type of scheme had occurred, and she goes to the bungalow to get the low down. Mrs. Waddington and Chubb leave for the rooftop in hopes of getting more evidence on Finch. Molly and Finch meet, make up, and prepare to elope, so Molly returns home to pack. Finch goes to a nearby cabaret to get a belated dinner, but the place is raided by the police. Finch his officer Garroway in the eye and then climbs a fire escape to his apartment with the officer behind him. In a number of mix-ups, the officer first finds Mrs. Waddington and Chubb in a compromising situation, then Beamish and Eulalia, and finally Molly and Finch. Old Waddington, hitherto dominated by his wife, holds the compromising situation over her and forces her to keep her mouth shut. Molly makes her own choice and finally marries Finch.

== Cast ==
- Barbara Kent as Molly Waddington
- George Beranger as Finch
- William Austin as Algernon Chubb
- Lucien Littlefield as Mr. Waddington
- Carmelita Geraghty as Eulalia
- Gertrude Astor as Fanny
- George Davis as Garroway
- Tom Dugan as Mullett
- Vera Lewis as Mrs. Waddington
- Ned Sparks as J. Hamilton Beamish

== Preservation ==
A print of The Small Bachelor exists and has been screened in 2025 at the Kennington Bioscope.
