= The Small Bachelor =

1927 novel by P. G. Wodehouse

- First edition (UK)
- Author: P. G. Wodehouse
- Language: English
- Genre: Comic novel
- Publisher: Methuen & Co. (UK); George H. Doran (US)
- Publication date: 28 April 1927 (UK); 17 June 1927 (US)
- Publication place: United Kingdom
- Media type: Print

The Small Bachelor is a novel by P. G. Wodehouse, first published in the United Kingdom on 28 April 1927 by Methuen & Co., London, and in the United States on 17 June 1927 by George H. Doran, New York.

It is based upon Wodehouse and Guy Bolton's book for the 1918 musical Oh, Lady! Lady!!.

Set during Prohibition, the story tells of the romantic troubles of George Finch, a short-statured would-be artist living in New York's Greenwich Village. George falls in love with Molly Waddington but faces opposition from her socially ambitious step-mother, who wants Molly to marry an English lord.

One of the novel's characters, Officer Garroway, returns in Galahad at Blandings (1964). The Waddingtons' butler Ferris appears to be the same Ferris employed as butler at Ashby Hall in Company for Henry (1967).

== Plot ==
On the roof of the Sheridan Apartment House, near Washington Square, New York, is a "small bachelor apartment, penthouse style", and the small bachelor who owns it is amateur artist George Finch, who is rich due to an inheritance. He falls in love with Molly Waddington at first sight, but is too shy to approach her until he retrieves her dog. George's authoritative friend J. Hamilton Beamish, author of self-help books, is helping mild-mannered policeman Garroway become a poet. Garroway recognizes George's valet, Frederick Mullett, an ex-convict who served time for burglary, though Mullett is now reformed. Mullett is engaged to former pickpocket Fanny Welch, who is somewhat less reformed.

George is invited into Molly's home by her father, Sigsbee H. Waddington; Mr Waddington, who has been influenced by Western films and novels, longs to go out West and takes a liking to George, since George is from East Gilead, Idaho. Though once wealthy, Mr Waddington cannot afford to go out West because he is now financially dependent on his rich wife, Molly's step-mother, socially ambitious Mrs Waddington. She dislikes George, believing his morals are suspect because he lives in an unconventional artist neighborhood, and wants Molly to marry the tall and handsome Lord Hunstanton. However, Molly finds Lord Hunstanton stiff and loves George. Hamilton Beamish gets help for George from Madame Eulalie, Mrs Waddington's palmist and fortune teller, who tells Mrs Waddington that disaster will strike if Molly marries Hunstanton. Beamish also falls in love with Madame Eulalie. Molly gets engaged to George, though Mrs Waddington still dislikes him.

Mr Waddington sells a pearl necklace (which is supposed to be given to Molly when she is married) to buy stock in a motion picture company, replacing the necklace with a fake. He tricks Garroway into buying the stock after it drops tremendously in value. George and Beamish learn that George's ex-fiancée from East Gilead, May Stubbs, is coming to George and Molly's wedding, and they fear she might put a stop to the wedding. Her engagement to George gradually faded but was never officially ended. They plan to have a girl pretend to be George's abandoned girlfriend so May will let this girl have George, and Hamilton Beamish enlists Fanny. When May arrives, Beamish recognizes her as Madame Eulalie. She only views George as a friend and returns Beamish's feelings, so he cancels the plan with Fanny. However, George and Molly's wedding is stopped when Fanny appears pretending to be George's abandoned girlfriend, using this ruse to distract the guests while she steals a pearl necklace on display there, not knowing it is fake. Frederick Mullett, now Fanny's husband, later convinces her to return the necklace.

Molly learns that Fanny was lying but Mrs Waddington still doubts George's morals, and searches his apartment for evidence against him, getting Lord Hunstanton to help. She is identified as a burglar by Officer Garroway, who tries to arrest her but is thwarted when she throws pepper at his face. She is ultimately forced to be less critical of George's morals after she is discovered in the embarrassing position of being alone in the apartment with Hunstanton. Mr Waddington, rich once again after buying back his now-valuable stock from Garroway, decides they should go out West and Mrs Waddington consents. She now likes George, since George hit Officer Garroway while escaping a police raid of a restaurant selling alcoholic drinks. Garroway is unwilling to make an arrest because George is Hamilton Beamish's friend. Initially, Garroway is disappointed that he cannot make an arrest after enduring pepper thrown at his face and the restaurant scuffle, but he is uplifted when invited to join George and the others in drinking two large bottles of champagne that George claims mysteriously appeared in his cupboard.

== Publication history ==
The story was published as a serial in Liberty between 18 September and 25 December 1926, with illustrations by James Montgomery Flagg. It was serialised in New magazine (UK) from December 1926 to July 1927.

The first UK edition dust wrapper was illustrated by Frank Marston, and the first US edition dust wrapper was illustrated by G. Hartmann. A new preface by Wodehouse was added in the 1970 UK edition.

== Adaptations ==
The novel was adapted into a silent film, also titled The Small Bachelor, in 1927.

A theatrical adaptation, entitled Over the Moon, was written by American playwright, Steven Dietz. It premiered at the Arizona Theatre Company in 2003, and was subsequently seen at the Seattle Repertory Theatre.
