= Jill the Reckless =

1920 novel by P. G. Wodehouse

- First UK edition
- Author: P. G. Wodehouse
- Cover artist: Edmund Blampied (UK)
- Language: English
- Genre: Comic novel
- Publisher: George H. Doran (US; Herbert Jenkins (UK)
- Publication date: 1920(US), 1921 (UK)
- Publication place: United States
- Media type: Print (Hardback & Paperback) & (Serial)
- Pages: ? pp

Jill The Reckless is a novel by P. G. Wodehouse, first published in the United States on October 8, 1920 by George H. Doran, New York, (under the title The Little Warrior), and in the United Kingdom by Herbert Jenkins, London, on 4 July 1921. It was serialised in Collier's (US) between 10 April and 28 August 1920, in Maclean's (Canada) between 1 August and 15 November 1920, in both cases as The Little Warrior, and, as Jill the Reckless, in the Grand Magazine (UK), from September 1920 to June 1921.

The heroine here, Jill Mariner, is a sweet-natured and wealthy young woman who, at the opening, is engaged to an MP, the baronet Sir Derek Underhill. We follow her through an adventure with a parrot, a policeman and the colourful proletariat; financial disaster; a broken engagement; an awkward stay with some grasping relatives; employment as a chorus girl; and the finding of true love.

Other characters include wealthy, dimwitted clubman Freddie Rooke and ruggedly attractive writer Wally Mason (both childhood friends of Jill's); her financially inept but charming uncle Major Christopher Selby; Sir Derek's domineering mother, Lady Underhill; Jill's unpleasant relatives on Long Island, New York, Elmer, Julia and Tibby Mariner; Drones Club member Algy Martyn; various chorus girls, composers and other theatrical types; and miscellaneous servants.

George Bevan, composer hero of Wodehouse's previous work A Damsel in Distress, receives a passing mention, as does an unspecified member of the Threepwood family. Algy Martyn later appears in Company for Henry.

The dust jacket of the UK first edition published by Herbert Jenkins was designed by Edmund Blampied.
