= Landis Report =

- Media type: Print
- Purpose: Transition team analysis and reexamination of United States federal regulatory commissions and administrative agencies.

The Landis Report was written by James M. Landis as a transition team analysis of the United States' administrative agencies for incoming President John F. Kennedy on December 21, 1960.

A long-time friend of the Kennedy family, Landis served as a legal advisor to Joseph P. Kennedy and was President Kennedy's Special Counsel. At the time of the report, Landis was on the faculty of Harvard Law School. The report recommended greater clarity on the roles and authority of agency chairs. The Kennedy Administration adopted many of the report's recommendations.

== Summary ==
The report reviewed the overall state of United States administrative law and the relationship between the independent agencies and the executive branch. Landis expressed a concern for the backlog in administrative law cases and the cost of participating in administrative hearings. The report expressed concerns about ethic of administrative proceedings, including extensive ex parte communications.

== Administrative Conference of the United States ==
A major recommendation of the Landis Report was the establishment of the Administrative Conference of the United States, which is a permanent agency to study Federal administrative procedures and develop recommendations for improvement. Similar recommendations were made during the Eisenhower and Kennedy administrations. In addition, the Landis Report recommended that legislation be adopted to establish a permanent agency. Such legislation was adopted in 1964 after President Kennedy's death.

== Power of agency chairs ==
Many federal administrative agencies have multiple members and operate as collegial bodies with one member designated as chairman. The report noted that before World War II, the main role of an agency chair was to preside at meetings, and agencies frequently rotated the chair duties among members annually. However, under post-World War II reorganization plans, the President was given the responsibility to designate the chair from among the agency's commissioners, and the chair was given the power to set the internal organization and policy direction of the agency. Landis noted that most chairs did not exercise this added authority, leaving the leadership of the agency to group decision making. Landis recommended that the reorganization plans for the Federal Power Commission and the Interstate Commerce Commission be amended to make the chair of each agency serve at the pleasure of the President. Landis also recommended that the plans for the administrative agencies clarify that the chair sets the budget, allocates funds and appoints the staff.
