= Vienna University Library =

Academic library in Vienna, Austria

- Universitätsbibliothek der Universität Wien
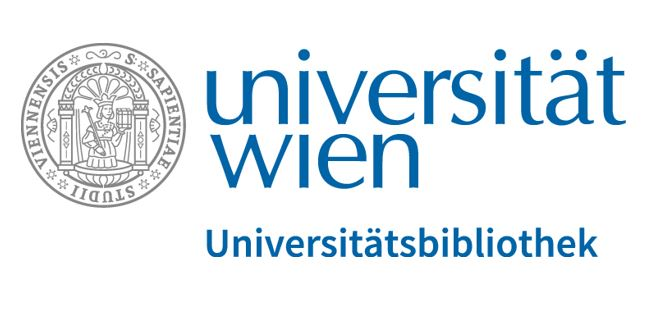
- Location: Vienna, Austria
- Type: Academic library
- Established: 12 March 1365; 661 years ago
- Architect: Heinrich von Ferstel
- Branches: 34

Collection
- Items collected: over 7.8 million

Other information
- Director: Andreas Brandtner
- Affiliation: Vienna University
- Website: https://bibliothek.univie.ac.at/en/

The Vienna University Library was founded in 1365, making it the oldest university library in the German-speaking world. It comprises the Main Library, housed in the Main Building of the University of Vienna on Universitätsring, as well as 33 special libraries located throughout Vienna. It serves the researchers, lecturers and students of the University of Vienna as a central information and service centre for academic research, academic research support and information literacy (e.g. in the form of training courses).

== Functions and services ==
The Vienna University Library primarily supports the members of the University of Vienna by providing high-quality academic resources and up-to-date information to support research, teaching and studies. As a place offering free access to knowledge and information, it is also open to the general public.

Anyone, including persons without a library card, may use the literature in the reading rooms. A library card is required to borrow books and other media. As a 'digital library', the Vienna University Library offers direct access via its website to numerous electronic resources such as e-books and e-journals, online catalogues and databases.

== History ==
The fate of the Vienna University Library has been closely linked to that of the University of Vienna ever since its foundation on 12 March 1365 by Duke [Rudolf IV]. The foundation deed provided for a “publica libraria”, where the books left behind by deceased university members – including numerous valuable [manuscripts] and [incunabula] – were to be collected. Thanks to numerous bequests, this collection subsequently grew considerably and formed the foundation of the old “Libreye”, which was located on the site of today’s Universitätsplatz. The holdings of the individual faculty libraries and the "Herzogskolleg" (Duke's College) were added to the collection.

Due to the Turkish Wars and the plague epidemics, the standing of the University of Vienna – and consequently that of its Library – declined sharply in the 16th and 17th centuries. Eventually, the Jesuit monastery library took over the duties of the university library, whose remaining holdings – 2,787 items – were incorporated into the Court Library in 1756.

The Library was re-established under Maria Theresa. Following the dissolution of the Jesuit Order (1773), the new Academic Library was opened in 1777, drawing on the Order’s book collections and a large number of duplicates from the then Court Library (now the Austrian National Library). The initial collection comprised around 45,000 books and was soon to be considerably expanded during Joseph II’s dissolution of the monasteries. Unlike its predecessors, the new library was now open to the general public.

From 1827 to 1829, the Library was housed in the neoclassical extension (Postgasse 9) to the Akademisches Kolleg (academic college), where it remained until 1884. In that year, the Main Library, with some 300,000 volumes, moved to the new Main Building on Ringstrasse, designed by architect Heinrich von Ferstel, offering storage space for around 500,000 volumes. However, with an annual increase of up to 30,000 volumes, the available space was soon exhausted. The book storage facilities had to be expanded time and again.

=== 20th century ===
During the Second World War, the book collection was moved to bomb-proof rooms in Lower Austria; many books were lost or damaged due to transport, poor storage and other war-related complications. By 1951, the reconstruction of the bomb-damaged university building on Ringstrasse was essentially complete, and a raised floor was installed in the reading room to create space for additional library stacks.

In the 1960s, individual rooms were provided to the Vienna University Library in the New Institute Building (NIG), but this gain in space was actually a setback, since the NIG was originally intended to be a dedicated library building.

When, in 1998, the stacks were so full that there was no longer any space for new books, the University rented the premises of the former Niederösterreichische Landesbibliothek (Lower Austrian Provincial Library) at Teinfaltstrasse 8 and around 300,000 books were moved there.

Over the years, entire collections were incorporated into the library holdings, such as that of the Austrian Central Library for Physics in 2004.

The collection of the Main Library was moved to a new book deposit in the 21st district of Vienna, which has been in operation since February 2025. From January 2025 until presumably 2027, the Main Library is being renovated.

== Directors ==
List of library directors since the Library was re-established by Maria Theresa (terms of office in brackets):

- Franz Stephan Rautenstrauch (1775–1785)
- [Johann Wilhelm Ridler] (1814–1834)
- Franz Lechner (1838–1851)
- Joseph Diemer (1851–1869)
- Johann Wussin (1869–1874)
- Friedrich Leithe (1874–1884)
- Ferdinand Grassauer (1884–1903)
- Wilhelm Haas (1903–1910)
- Isidor Himmelbaur (1910–1919)
- Salomon Frankfurter (1919–1923)
- Gottlieb August Crüwell (1923–1931)
- Heinrich Röttinger (1932–1933)
- Johann Gans (1933–1938)
- Alois Jesinger (1938–1945)
- Johann Gans (1945–1951)
- Rudolf Dettelmaier (1952–1968)
- Friedrich Rennhofer (1969–1980)
- Ferdinand Baumgartner (1981–1993)
- Ilse Dosoudil (1993–2003)
- Maria Seissl (2004–2024; 2003–2004 temporary)
- Andreas Brandtner (since 2024)

== The Library in figures ==
The Vienna University Library is Austria’s largest academic library (figures as of 2025):

	Total	Special libraries	Main Library
Book collection:	7,839,311	4,889,830	2,949,481
E-book collection:	2,228,718		
E-journal collection: Databases licensed:	169,716 663		
Search queries u:search:	11,050,182		
Items borrowed:	2,791,593		
Electronic full-text access:	7,866,580		
Ältestes im Bestand befindliches Buch:	Dorotheerbibel (1392)		

== Institutional structure ==
Since the reign of Maria Theresa, the Vienna University Library and, consequently, its management have been directly subordinate to the Federal Minister. This changed in 2000, when the Vienna University Library has become subject to the supervision of the Rectorate of the University of Vienna rather than the Ministry.

When the 2002 Universities Act entered into force (in January 2004), the Main Library was merged with the University of Vienna Archive and the 33 special libraries (formed from former faculty, subject and department libraries) to become the “Vienna University Library and Archive Services”.

== Bibliography ==
=== General ===
- Cornaro, Leopold a.o.: Universitätsbibliothek Wien. Hauptbibliothek. In: Austrian National Library (Ed.): Handbuch der historischen Buchbestände in Österreich, Edition 1, Hildesheim 1994, P. 177–258 (https://fabian.sub.uni-goettingen.de/fabian?Universitaetsbibliothek_Wien), followed by a further 22 sections on departmental, subject and faculty libraries)
- Fritz, Gerhard: Die Raumnot der Universitätsbibliothek. Published by the Vienna University Library, under the direction of Ilse Dosoudil. Vienna University Library, Vienna 1997
- Neffe, Sieghard (Ed.): Die Universitätsbibliothek Wien. Geschichte, Organisation, Benützung. 7., revised edition. Vienna University Library, Vienna 1987

=== About the history ===
- Alker, Hugo: Das Gebäude der alten Wiener Universitätsbibliothek in der Postgasse. Society of Friends of the Austrian National Library, Vienna 1955
- Pongratz, Walter: Geschichte der Universitätsbibliothek Wien. Böhlau, Vienna (a.o.) 1977, ISBN 3-205-07132-8
- Pongratz, Walter: Die Universitätsbibliothek Wien in der NS-Zeit. In: Mitteilungen der Vereinigung österreichischer Bibliothekare, Nr. 2 (July)/1988 (XLI. Year), ISSN 0042-3793. Association of Austrian Librarians, Vienna 1988, P. 57–75 ( ALO docView - Mitteilungen der Vereinigung Österreichischer Bibliothekare (41_02/1988)) in ALO.
- Leithe, Friedrich: Die k. k. Universitätsbibliothek in Wien. Eine historisch-statistische Skizze. Gerold, Vienna 1877.
- Zwanziger, Ronald (Ed.): Hundert Jahre Universitätsbibliothek Wien im Haus am Ring. 1884–1984. Biblos-Scripts, Edition 126, ZDB-ID 501904-7. Association of Austrian Librarians (VÖB), Vienna 1984
- Alker, Stefan; Köstner, Christina: Identifizierung von Raubgut. Erwerbungspolitik an der Universitätsbibliothek Wien während der NS-Zeit. Bericht der Provenienzforschung. In: NS-Raubgut in Bibliotheken. Suche. Ergebnisse. Perspektiven. Klostermann, Frankfurt am Main 2008, Pp. 97–109
- Malina, Peter: Die Universitätsbibliothek Wien 1938–45. Archiv Verlag, Braunschweig 2012
- Digitised documents on the history of the Vienna University Library: they deal with the creation of new catalogues, order in the reading room and other issues that occupied library directors up until the beginning of the 20th century (https://goobi-viewer.univie.ac.at/viewer/search/-/-/1/-/DC%3Abibliotheksgeschichte/)

=== Special collections and divisions ===
- Alker, Hugo (compiled by), Leopold Cornaro (ed.): Universitätsbibliothek Wien – Katalog der Inkunabeln. 2nd revised and expanded edition. Vienna University Library, Vienna 1996, ISBN 3-901739-00-9.

=== Commemorative publications and honours ===
- Die Universitätsbibliothek Wien. Ein kurzer Überblick über die Geschichte, den gegenwärtigen Stand und einen Ausblick in die Zukunft der Universitätsbibliothek Wien. Commemorative publication marking the 625th anniversary of the University of Vienna. Notitiae Austriacae. A cultural journal promoting the Latin language, general and humanistic education, ZDB-ID 1038665-8. Dr. Hans Kutschera, Vienna 1990
- Seissl, Maria (honouree); Alker-Windbichler, Stefan et al. (eds.), Menschen im Aufbruch: Universitätsbibliothek und Archiv der Universität Wien im Selbstverständnis ihrer Mitarbeiter_innen: Festschrift für Maria Seissl. V&R unipress, Göttingen 2019, ISBN 978-3-8471-1098-9 DOI:10.14220/9783737010986 (online (= Menschen im Aufbruch))
- Winkler, Johann (honouree); ,Christian et al. (eds.); Cornaro, Leopold (illustrator): „Beyond the horizon“. Festgabe in Würdigung von Johann Winkler. Große Formalerschließerinnen und Formalerschließer des 20. und 21. Jahrhunderts., Vienna 2009 (https://phaidra.univie.ac.at/api/object/o:51746/preview)
- Sestis, Elisabeth (honouree); Schmid, Elisabeth et al. (eds.), Cornaro, Leopold (illustrator): Lichtblicke. Festgabe in Würdigung von Elisabeth Sestis. Große Formalerschließerinnen und Formalerschließer des 20. und 21. Jahrhunderts., Vienna 2010 (https://phaidra.univie.ac.at/api/object/o:344761/preview)
