= James M. Landis =

American lawyer, regulator (1899–1964)

James Landis
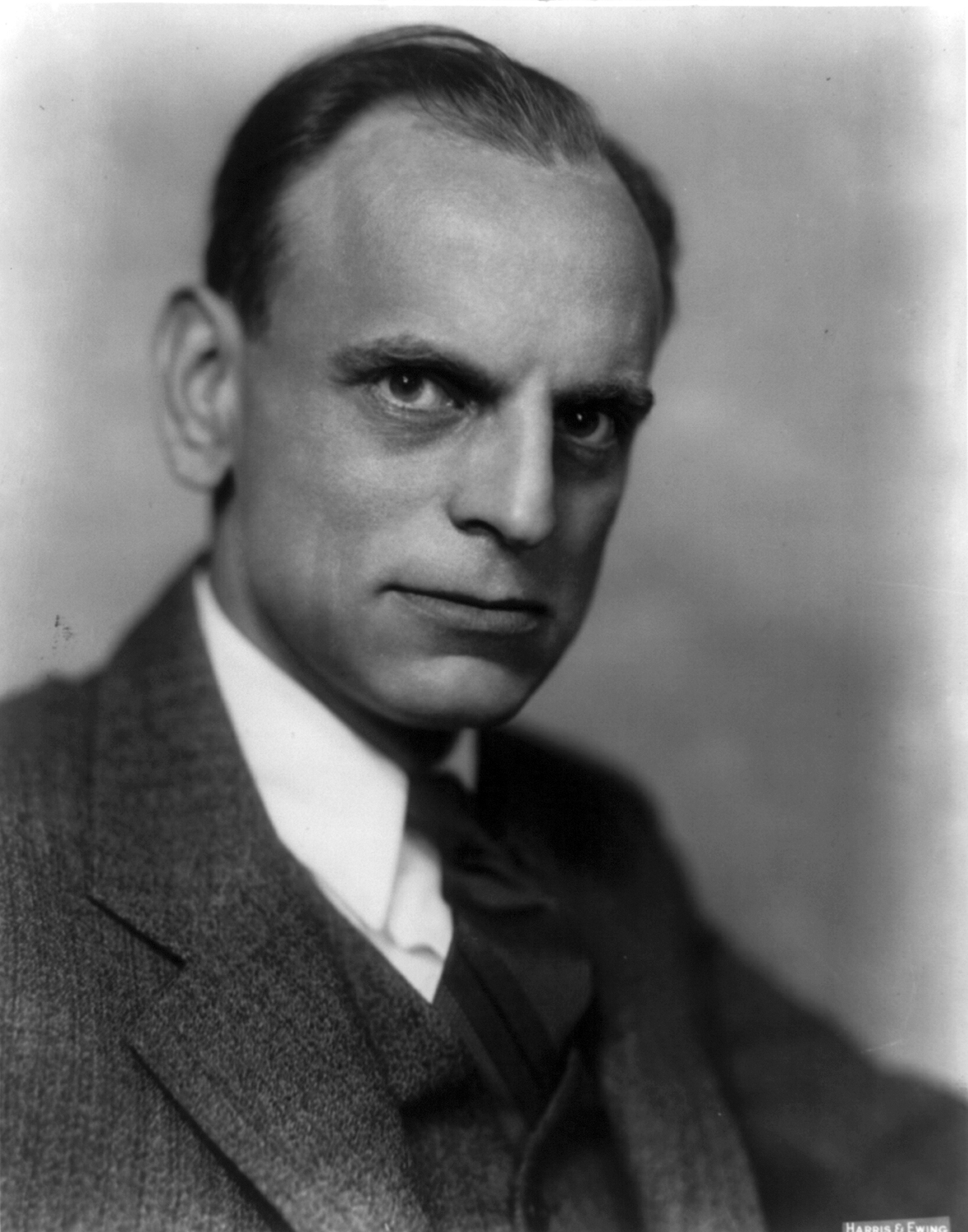
- Landis, c. 1938

Director of the Office of Civilian Defense
- In office February 12, 1942 – September 8, 1943; Acting: February 12, 1942 – April 15, 1942
- President: Franklin D. Roosevelt
- Preceded by: Fiorello La Guardia
- Succeeded by: John Martin (acting)

5th Dean of Harvard Law School
- In office 1937–1946
- Preceded by: Roscoe Pound
- Succeeded by: Erwin Griswold

2nd Chair of the Securities and Exchange Commission
- In office September 23, 1935 – September 15, 1937
- President: Franklin D. Roosevelt
- Preceded by: Joseph P. Kennedy
- Succeeded by: William O. Douglas

Member of the Securities and Exchange Commission
- In office June 30, 1934 – September 15, 1937
- President: Franklin D. Roosevelt
- Preceded by: Position established
- Succeeded by: William O. Douglas

Commissioner of the Federal Trade Commission
- In office October 7, 1933 – June 30, 1934
- President: Franklin D. Roosevelt
- Preceded by: William E. Humphrey
- Succeeded by: William Augustus Ayres

Personal details
- Born: James McCauley Landis; September 25, 1899 Tokyo, Japan
- Died: July 30, 1964 (aged 64) Harrison, New York, U.S.
- Party: Democratic
- Education: Princeton University (BA); Harvard University (LLB)

James McCauley Landis (September 25, 1899 – July 30, 1964) was an American government official and legal adviser. He served as chairman of the Securities and Exchange Commission from 1935 to 1937.

== Biography ==
Landis was born in Tokyo, Japan, where his parents were teachers at a missionary school. After completing his studies at Mercersburg Academy in 1916, he graduated from Princeton University and in 1924 received a LL.B. from Harvard Law School, where he was a student of Felix Frankfurter. In 1925, Landis was a law clerk to Justice Louis Brandeis of the U.S. Supreme Court. He then became a professor at Harvard Law School, until called into government service during the New Deal.

Landis served as a member of the Federal Trade Commission (1933–1934), as a member of the Securities and Exchange Commission (1934–1937), and as chairman of the Securities and Exchange Commission (1935–1937). He was elected to the American Academy of Arts and Sciences in 1938 and the American Philosophical Society in 1942. While dean of the Harvard Law School from 1937 to 1946, Landis served as regional director of the U.S. Office of Civilian Defense (1941–1942) and then as its national director (1942–1943). He was removed from his position of dean following an affair he had with a secretary. President Franklin D. Roosevelt sent him to Egypt as American Director of Economic Operations in the Middle East (1943–1945). In 1946, Roosevelt's successor, Harry S. Truman, later appointed him chairman of the Civil Aeronautics Board, a position he served until the next year. A friend of the Kennedy family for years, he served as a legal advisor to Joseph P. Kennedy and as Special Counsel to President John F. Kennedy. In 1960 he drafted the Landis Report to President-elect Kennedy, reexamining the federal regulatory commissions and recommending such reforms as strengthening the commissions' chairmen and streamlining their procedures, which the Kennedy administration adopted.

Landis failed to pay his income taxes from 1956 to 1960. After this came to light in 1963, he pleaded guilty and was sentenced to one month in jail. Because of illness, he spent the month in hospital facilities. Less than a year after he returned home, he suffered a heart attack and drowned in his swimming pool.

== Works ==
- The Business of the Supreme Court, by James M. Landis and Felix Frankfurter (New York, 1928)
- The Administrative Process, by James M. Landis (New Haven, 1938)

== See also ==
- List of law clerks for the fourth seat of the Supreme Court of the United States

Government offices
Preceded by Joseph P. Kennedy	Chair of the Securities and Exchange Commission; 1935–1937	Succeeded by William O. Douglas
Preceded by Fiorello La Guardia	Director of the Office of Civilian Defense; 1942–1943	Succeeded by John Martin; Acting
Preceded by L. Welch Pogue	Chair of the Civil Aeronautics Board; 1946–1947	Succeeded by Laurence S. Kuter
Academic offices
Preceded by Roscoe Pound	Dean of Harvard Law School; 1937–1946	Succeeded by Erwin Griswold
