= Quick Service =

1940 novel by P. G. Wodehouse

- First edition (UK)
- Author: P. G. Wodehouse
- Cover artist: Fenwick
- Language: English
- Genre: Comic novel
- Publisher: Herbert Jenkins (UK); Doubleday, Doran (US)
- Publication date: 4 October 1940 (UK); 27 December 1940 (US)
- Publication place: United Kingdom
- Media type: Print

Quick Service is a novel by P. G. Wodehouse, first published in the United Kingdom on 4 October 1940 by Herbert Jenkins, London and in the United States on 27 December 1940 by Doubleday, Doran, New York.

In the novel, businessman James Duff wants to obtain a portrait that is in a country house. He makes a deal with young Lord Holbeton and Holbeton's fiancée Sally Fairmile to get them to steal the painting. Joss Weatherby, an advertising artist at Duff's company, falls in love with Sally and soon becomes involved in Duff's plotting.

== Plot ==
Mrs and Mr Steptoe, from Los Angeles, live in Claines Hall, near Loose Chippings, Sussex. Over the fireplace hangs a portrait by artist Jocelyn "Joss" Weatherby of Mrs Beatrice Chavender, widow of Mrs Steptoe's brother, with a haughty expression. The rich, socially ambitious Mrs Steptoe, who gives her poor relation Sally tasks to earn her keep, tells Sally to go to London to find a valet who can make her reluctant husband dress respectably for high society. Mrs Chavendar finds the breakfast ham uneatable. Since it is a Paramount Ham, a product sold by Duff and Trotter, she decides to complain to her former fiancé James Duff, managing director of the firm, because he used to bore her about ham. George, second Baron Holbeton, worries this will upset Duff. Duff is the trustee of his inheritance (since George's father was Duff's business partner) and George wants the money. George's fiancée Sally volunteers to talk to Duff.

Joss Weatherby, advertising artist for Duff and Trotter, sees Mrs Chavendar at Duff's office. Duff has stepped out to avoid her. Mrs Chavender thinks Duff has become a grouch because he is not married and asks if Joss is married. Joss has not married but is eager to marry someday, and tells Mrs Chavender that she will see quick service as soon as the right girl comes along. Later, Duff thinks of using Joss's portrait of Mrs Chavender for a Paramount Ham advertising poster (with her looking at a non-Paramount ham with haughty disapproval), but Mrs Steptoe refuses to sell the painting for fear of offending Mrs Chavender, since she might someday inherit Mrs Chavender's wealth. Duff fires Joss for eating company fruit. Sally appears, and Joss quickly falls in love with her. She needs a valet, and Joss takes the job to be near her. Duff makes a deal with Sally that George can get his money if he steals the portrait, claiming he wants the painting because he still loves Mrs Chavender.

At Claines Hall, Joss befriends the butler Chibnall and blackmails Mr Steptoe, who tried to win money off the cook in a game of craps, into dressing correctly for high society. He gives Mr Steptoe advice on playing craps, and Steptoe confides in Joss that he wants to be an actor in Hollywood but lacks money for transportation. Duff doubts George will steal the painting and offers to buy it from Mr Steptoe, who recruits Joss to steal it. George tries to steal it but fails. Joss also makes a failed attempt, and Chibnall, influenced by his fiancée Vera who reads crime novels, is now suspicious of Joss. Mrs Chavender tells Joss she wants a share of Duff's payment for the painting, since she actually lost her money in a stock crash. She has kept this secret from Mrs Steptoe, who is not generous with her poor relations. She also informs Joss about Sally's engagement to George. Duff tells Sally about Joss's feelings for her.

Both Joss and Sally hope to steal the painting during Mrs Steptoe's garden party, but the party is ruined by rain. Mr Steptoe has lost badly at craps and needs money, so Joss takes a chance and steals the painting. He also tells Sally he wants to marry her and impulsively kisses her. George sees this and ends their engagement, since he no longer wants to marry her anyway. Joss apologizes, but Sally reveals she wants to marry Joss. Mrs Steptoe finds Joss smoking in her room and fires him. Duff changes his mind about George and gives him his money, and inadvertently proposes to Mrs Chavender, who accepts, having heard he still loves her. Joss and Duff plan to retrieve the painting from Joss's room; Vera eavesdrops and warns Chibnall. Chibnall finds the painting, apprehends Joss and Duff, and brings Joss to Mrs Steptoe. Joss tries to take the blame for stealing the painting, and so does Mrs Chavender, who admits she needs the money. Mr Steptoe, impressed with Joss for not revealing his involvement, becomes more assertive and defends Joss. He declares he will sell Duff the painting and convinces Mrs Steptoe to come with him to Hollywood where there is less rain. At Mrs Chavender's insistence, Duff rehires and promotes Joss, and bribes Chibnall to keep quiet about Duff's misadventures, allowing Chibnall and Vera to buy a pub. Duff is uncertain about marrying Mrs Chavender, until he realises they are soulmates when she suggests using her portrait in a ham advertisement.

== Characters ==
- Howard Steptoe, formerly a boxer nicknamed Mugsy, who resolutely resists all attempts at smartening him up by...
- Mabel Steptoe (née Chavender), his wealthy, socially ambitious wife who recently purchased Claines Hall, and has with her, acting as factotum...
- Sally Fairmile, her impoverished distant cousin once removed, who is very lively and is secretly engaged to...
- George, Lord Holbeton (formerly of the name of Trotter), a refined young man and habitual singer of "Trees", whose inheritance is kept in trust and whose trustee is...
- James Duff, of Duff and Trotter, London's leading provision merchants (a firm also mentioned in Company for Henry and Money in the Bank), who was once engaged to...
- Beatrice Chavender, widowed sister-in-law of Mrs Steptoe, apparently very rich, and currently residing in Claines Hall, who has had her imperious self painted by...
- Joss Weatherby, an outgoing advertising artist employed by Duff, who goes to Claines Hall as a valet to be near Sally, whom he loves, and plays bridge in the servants' hall with...
- Sidney Chibnall, the vigilant butler of Claines Hall and a boxer, with a proclivity for romantic novelettes, who is engaged to...
- Vera Pym, who prefers thrillers, and works as a barmaid at an inn called the Rose and Crown, in Loose Chippings, near Claines Hall.

== Publication history ==
The story was serialised in The Saturday Evening Post from 4 May to 22 June 1940, illustrated by Gilbert Bundy. The UK first edition dust jacket was illustrated by Fenwick. The dust jacket of the first US edition was illustrated by Donald McKay.

The complete novel was included in The Most of Wodehouse, a collection of Wodehouse stories published by Simon and Schuster, New York, on 15 October 1960, to celebrate Wodehouse's seventy-ninth birthday.
