= Bobbie Wickham =

Fictional character in P. G. Wodehouse stories

- Jeeves, Mr. Mulliner character
- First appearance: "Something Squishy" (1924)
- Last appearance: Jeeves in the Offing (1960)
- Created by: P. G. Wodehouse
- Portrayed by: Tracy Reed; Pauline Collins and others

In-universe information
- Full name: Roberta Wickham
- Nickname: Bobbie
- Gender: Female
- Family: Lady Wickham (mother); Sir Cuthbert (father) (deceased)
- Relatives: Mr. Mulliner (first cousin, once removed)
- Nationality: British

Roberta "Bobbie" Wickham is a recurring fictional character in the Jeeves and Mr. Mulliner stories of English comic writer P. G. Wodehouse, being a mischievous red-headed girl who is fond of practical jokes. She is a friend and one-time love interest of Jeeves's master Bertie Wooster, and a relative of Mr. Mulliner.

== Life and character ==
Roberta "Bobbie" Wickham is the daughter of Lady Wickham and the late Sir Cuthbert of Skeldings Hall, Herts. She is also the first cousin, once removed, of Mr. Mulliner, Lady Wickham being his cousin. She has bright red hair, which is sometimes styled into a shingle bob. Described as being built along the lines of Clara Bow, she is a slim, boyish-looking girl, who "resembled a particularly good-looking schoolboy who had dressed up in his sister's clothes". Bertie's Aunt Dahlia describes her as "a one-girl beauty chorus". Bobbie was educated at St. Monica's school at Bingley-on-Sea. She enjoys pranks, and generally creates trouble, intentionally and accidentally.

Bertie Wooster is in love with her in one story, "Jeeves and the Yule-tide Spirit", though Bertie's valet Jeeves does not think she would be a suitable partner for Bertie. Jeeves is concerned by her frivolous nature, as well as her vivid red hair, which he considers a dangerous sign. At first, Bertie ignores Jeeves's misgivings but Bertie's feelings about Bobbie change after he discovers that he was a target of Bobbie's latest prank, which involved him, Tuppy Glossop and hot water bottles. Bertie remains friendly towards her and helps her with various tasks in later stories, as he feels that he can still be civil to her even though he is no longer in love. In "Episode of the Dog McIntosh", Bobbie wants Bertie's help to sell a play written by her mother to the American producer, Mr. Blumenfeld. In "Jeeves and the Kid Clementina" she tells Bertie to return her cousin kid Clementina to school. As Clementina is out without permission, Bobbie tells Bertie to use a method involving a flower pot and string to sneak Clementina into school. These three short stories are collected in Very Good, Jeeves.

Bobbie's last appearance is in the novel Jeeves in the Offing, in which Bertie is alarmed by an announcement in The Times stating that he is engaged to Bobbie. Bertie later learns from her that the announcement is fake; Bobbie's plan is that her mother, who does not like Bertie, will be so relieved that Bobbie is not engaged to Bertie that she will readily approve of Bobbie's engagement to Reginald "Kipper" Herring. Her mother might not otherwise approve, since, though Bobbie loves Kipper, she acknowledges that he does not have a title and is not wealthy. Bobbie and Kipper have disputes in the novel but they ultimately reconcile and are engaged at the end of the story.

Aside from Bertie and Kipper, Bobbie was courted by Roland Attwater in "Something Squishy", Dudley Finch in "The Awful Gladness of the Mater", Clifford Gandle in "Mr Potter Takes a Rest Cure", and Ambrose Wiffin in "The Passing of Ambrose". Bobbie also appears in "Dudley Is Back to Normal", though this story was later rewritten to be a Mr. Mulliner story without Bobbie. In the original version of the story, Dudley is charmed by Bobbie and falls for her again. After she tricks him, Dudley no longer has feelings for her and is back to normal. In "Jeeves: A Gentleman's Personal Gentleman", by C Northcote Parkinson (published with permission from the Wodehouse estate) Bertie Wooster finds out that Bobbie and Kipper have broken up. After a chance meeting of Bobbie and Wooster while purchasing "end of engagement" presents, Bertie invites Bobbie for dinner and proposes to Bobbie, they marry.

== Appearances ==
Bobbie Wickham is featured in:

- Mr Mulliner Speaking (1929)
  - "Something Squishy" (1924) – Mr. Mulliner
  - "The Awful Gladness of the Mater" (1925) – Mr. Mulliner
  - "The Passing of Ambrose" (1928) – Mr. Mulliner
- Blandings Castle and Elsewhere (1935)
  - "Mr Potter Takes a Rest Cure" (1926) – Bobbie
- Very Good, Jeeves (1930)
  - "Jeeves and the Yule-tide Spirit" (1927) – Jeeves
  - "Episode of the Dog McIntosh" (1929) – Jeeves
  - "Jeeves and the Kid Clementina" (1930) – Jeeves
- Plum Stones (1993)
  - "Dudley Is Back to Normal" (1940) – Bobbie
- Jeeves in the Offing (1960) – Jeeves
- "Jeeves: A Gentleman's Personal Gentleman" (1979), by C. Northcote Parkinson.

== Adaptations ==
Television

- Tracy Reed portrayed Bobbie in BBC One's black-and-white The World of Wooster (1965–1967).
- Pauline Collins portrayed Bobbie in the 1975–1978 series Wodehouse Playhouse, in the episode "Mr. Potter Takes a Rest Cure".
- In the 1990-1993 television series Jeeves and Wooster, Bobbie was portrayed by Nina Botting in series 1, episode 2 and Niamh Cusack in series 2, episode 6. In the beginning of each of these episodes, Bertie wants to propose to Bobbie, whereas in the original Jeeves canon, Bertie was only romantically interested in her in one story. The first time he wants to propose to her in the television series is still related to the hot water bottle incident; the second time, Bertie considers marrying Bobbie when he becomes interested in raising a daughter. Bobbie did not appear in the canonical story in which Bertie considers parenthood, "Bertie Changes His Mind".

== See also ==
- List of Jeeves characters, an alphabetical list of Jeeves characters
- List of P. G. Wodehouse characters in the Jeeves stories, a categorized outline of Jeeves characters
- List of Jeeves and Wooster characters, a list of characters in the television series
