= The Spot of Art =

Short story by P. G. Wodehouse

- Short story by P. G. Wodehouse
- Country: United Kingdom
- Language: English
- Genre: Comedy

Publication
- Publisher: The Strand Magazine (UK); Cosmopolitan (US)
- Media type: Print (Magazine)
- Publication date: December 1929

Chronology
- Series: Jeeves
Episode of the Dog McIntosh	Jeeves and the Kid Clementina

"The Spot of Art" is a short story by P. G. Wodehouse, and features the young gentleman Bertie Wooster and his valet Jeeves. The story was published in The Strand Magazine in the United Kingdom in December 1929, and in Cosmopolitan in the United States that same month, as "Jeeves and the Spot of Art". The story was also included as the sixth story in the 1930 collection Very Good, Jeeves.

In the story, Bertie has fallen for the artist Gwladys Pendlebury, who painted his portrait, and decides not to go on a yacht cruise in order to be near her. However, Jeeves does not care for Gwladys or the portrait, and wants to go with Bertie on the cruise.

== Plot ==
While lunching with his Aunt Dahlia, Bertie tells her that he will not be able to join her on her upcoming yachting cruise because he has fallen in love with an artist, Gwladys Pendlebury. She painted a portrait of Bertie that he hung in his flat. Bertie must stay in town to head off his rival for Gwladys's affections, Lucius Pim. Aunt Dahlia is confident that Jeeves will stop the match between Bertie and Gwladys, destroy Bertie's portrait, and deliver Bertie to Aunt Dahlia's yacht.

In his flat, Bertie sees Jeeves, who had wanted to go on the yacht cruise, and who also disapproves of Bertie's portrait, due to its hungry look. Jeeves informs Bertie that Gwladys was in a car accident; she ran over a gentleman's leg. The man, Lucius Pim, is now in Bertie's spare bedroom, by Gwladys's request. A doctor stated that Pim should not be moved. Bertie speaks to Pim, who mentions that his sister, the wife of Slingsby of Slingsby's Superb Soups, is coming tomorrow, and will prosecute Gwladys if she finds out that Gwladys injured him. To protect her, Pim asks Bertie not to tell Mrs. Slingsby what happened. Later, Pim tells his sister it was Bertie who ran him over. Now that Mrs. Slingsby is angry with Bertie, Pim suggests that Bertie send her flowers. Bertie reluctantly sends Mrs. Slingsby roses.

Expecting Mrs. Slingsby to arrive, Bertie is surprised when Mr. Slingsby shows up. He is angry that Bertie sent his wife flowers. From within the flat, Mrs. Slingsby appears, and Bertie realizes she left home before the flowers arrived. Mr. Slingsby charges at Bertie, only to trip on a golf ball Bertie had been practicing with. Bertie tells Jeeves to let Mr. Slingsby recuperate in his bedroom. He asks Jeeves to notify him when the flat is empty, then leaves for Paris.

The thing was a bally libel on the Wooster face, and yet it was as unmistakable as if it had had my name under it. I saw now what Jeeves had meant when he said that the portrait had given me a hungry look. In the poster this look had become one of bestial greed.

— Bertie sees himself in a poster for Slingsby's soup

Three weeks later, Jeeves notifies Bertie that the flat is clear. Bertie returns to London and is shocked by a poster for Slingsby's Superb Soups with an image of his portrait. At home, Jeeves says that he gave the portrait to Mr. Slingsby, on the condition that Mr. Slingsby not bring Bertie to court. Pim, having become Gwladys's fiancé, acted as Gwladys's agent for the portrait's copyright deal. Letting Gwladys go, Bertie is more concerned that his face is on soup posters. Jeeves suggests that they join Bertie's Aunt Dahlia on her cruise, which was postponed. Happily, Bertie approves this plan.

== Style ==
While Jeeves's speeches are usually short and designed to convey information to Bertie (or hide it from him), Jeeves occasionally gives speeches that are much longer than necessary, which make his learning and intelligence humorous through exaggeration. The first instance of this occurs in "The Spot of Art", when Jeeves provides Bertie with detailed information about his calculations of Mrs. Slingsby's movements from Paris to Dover or Folkestone and then to London. Bertie, who is worried about his predicament, impatiently interrupts him. A similar interaction also occurs shortly afterward when Jeeves brings up "the poet Scott".

Throughout the Jeeves series, repetition is used in multiple ways to create humour. For example, Bertie occasionally repeats his narration almost verbatim in his dialogue, which he does after Jeeves tells him that Gwladys has become engaged to Lucius Pim:

After the poster nothing seemed to matter.
"After that poster, Jeeves," I said, "nothing seems to matter."

A different kind of repetition is also used when Bertie is visited by the irate Mr Slingsby:

"Have a drink?" I said.
"No!"
"A cigarette?"
"No!
"A chair?"
"No!"
I went into silence once more. These non-drinking, non-smoking, non-sitters are hard birds to handle.

== Publication history ==
The story was illustrated by Charles Crombie in the Strand and by James Montgomery Flagg in Cosmopolitan.

Under the title "Jeeves and the Spot of Art", the story was included in the American edition of the 1939 collection The Week-End Wodehouse.

== Adaptations ==
An episode of The World of Wooster adapted the story. The episode, titled "Jeeves and the Spot of Art", was the third episode of the second series. It was originally broadcast in the UK on 8 January 1966.

This story was adapted into the Jeeves and Wooster episode "Return to New York", the first episode of the fourth series, which first aired on 16 May 1993. There are some changes in plot, including:

- The episode takes place in New York rather than London.
- In the episode, the painting is of Aunt Agatha, not Bertie.
- In the episode, Aunt Dahlia does not appear, and there is no mention of a cruise.
- Lucius Pim is an artist in the original story; in the episode, he is an advertising agent working for Slingsby.
- In the episode, Bertie is not aware that Gwladys spells her name with a "w" until Jeeves expresses concern about this, pointing it out in the signature on the portrait. In the original story, Bertie was always aware of this, and it is Aunt Dahlia who expresses concern about the unusual spelling.
