= Jeeves and the Kid Clementina =

- Short story by P. G. Wodehouse
- Country: United Kingdom
- Language: English
- Genre: Comedy

Publication
- Publisher: The Strand Magazine
- Media type: Print (Magazine)
- Publication date: January 1930

Chronology
- Series: Jeeves
The Spot of Art	The Love That Purifies

"Jeeves and the Kid Clementina" is a short story by P. G. Wodehouse, and features the young gentleman Bertie Wooster and his valet Jeeves. The story was published in The Strand Magazine in the United Kingdom in January 1930, and in Cosmopolitan in the United States that same month. The story was also included as the seventh story in the 1930 collection Very Good, Jeeves.

In the story, Bobbie Wickham tells Bertie to sneak her cousin Clementina back into her boarding school, as Clementina is away from school without permission. Bobbie suggests using a method that involves a flower-pot and string.

== Plot ==
Bertie goes to the annual Drones Club golf tournament at Bingley-on-Sea, where his Aunt Agatha's friend Miss Mapleton runs a girls' school, St. Monica's. Bertie wants to avoid Miss Mapleton. Jeeves disapproves of Bertie's new bright plus-fours and his plan to join Bobbie Wickham's party in Antibes in summer. On the pier, Bertie and Jeeves see Bobbie, who is visiting her cousin Clementina ("Clem"). Bobbie gets Bertie to give her and Clementina dinner and take them to the movies.

Afterwards, before Bertie is to bring Clementina back to school, Bobbie reveals that Clementina goes to St. Monica's, and she is not supposed to be out of school. Bobbie outlines how Bertie must sneak Clementina back into school: Bertie will take flower-pots from the school's conservatory, then climb a nearby tree, tie a string to a pot, balance the pot over a branch overhanging the conservatory ceiling, then move away and jerk the string from a distance. The pot will break the glass, someone will come out to investigate, and while the door is open, Clem will sneak in and go to bed.

I'm never my best at describing things. At school, when we used to do essays and English composition, my report generally read "Has little or no ability, but does his best," or words to that effect. True, in the course of years I have picked up a vocabulary of sorts from Jeeves, but even so I'm not nearly hot enough to draw a word-picture that would do justice to that extraordinarily hefty crash. Try to imagine the Albert Hall falling on the Crystal Palace, and you will have got the rough idea.

— The flower-pot crashes into the ceiling

Bertie tells Jeeves that Clementina is away without leave. Jeeves tries to propose his own solution, but Bertie, wishing to prove himself, shushes Jeeves. Instead, Bertie presents Bobbie's plan as his own, and adds that Jeeves will guide the kid inside after the glass is smashed. As Bertie approaches the school, he regrets ignoring Jeeves, but he proceeds. A policeman catches Bertie up the tree. Jeeves appears and tells the officer that Bertie had come to call on Miss Mapleton, but was pursuing intruders he spotted in the garden. To verify this story, the policeman brings them to Miss Mapleton. To Bertie's astonishment, she confirms Jeeves's story. The flower-pot, which Bertie left balancing on the branch, falls and crashes loudly into the glass ceiling, but Miss Mapleton attributes this to the intruders Jeeves told her about.

Later, Bertie asks Jeeves to explain what happened. Jeeves answers that he entered the school and asked to see Miss Mapleton; while the maid had gone to Miss Mapleton, Jeeves guided Clementina into the house unseen. Then he met Miss Mapleton and told her that Bertie was in the garden pursuing intruders. Bertie cancels his plan to join Bobbie at Antibes, and tells Jeeves that he may give away the plus-fours.

== Style ==
Though Jeeves's speeches are usually short, he sometimes gives long verbose speeches which comically exaggerate his learning, and which he can use to deliberately confuse or impress someone. For example, in "Jeeves and the Kid Clementina", Jeeves gives a long speech to the constable who tries to arrest Bertie:

"I shall be delighted to accompany you, officer, if such is your wish. And I feel sure that in this connexion I may speak for Mr. Wooster also. He too, I am confident, will interpose no obstacle in the way of your plans. If you consider that circumstances have placed Mr. Wooster in a position that might be termed equivocal, or even compromising, it will naturally be his wish to exculpate himself at the earliest possible—"
"Here!" said the policeman, slightly rattled.
"Officer?"
"Less of it."
"Just as you say, officer."
"Switch it off and come along."
"Very good, officer."

According to Kristin Thompson, Jeeves does not always tell Bertie everything he has done to manipulate events by the end of the story, and Wodehouse uses cues to indicate Jeeves's secret manipulations to the reader. For example. In "Jeeves and the Kid Clementina", the policeman confronts Bertie while he is up in a tree trespassing in the school grounds. The only information given about how the policeman got there is his statement that somebody called the police station about an intruder in Miss Mapleton's garden. It is also shown that when Bertie parts from Jeeves and Clementina, he gives Jeeves ten minutes' start before carrying out his part of Bobbie's scheme. The reader can infer that Jeeves used that time to call the police himself or got someone else, like Miss Mapleton, to do it, knowing this would help convince Miss Mapleton that Bertie was pursuing burglars and show Bertie the dangers of Bobbie's schemes, and that he would be able to rescue Bertie from the police.

== Publication history ==
The story was illustrated by Charles Crombie in the Strand and by James Montgomery Flagg in Cosmopolitan.

"Jeeves and the Kid Clementina" was featured in the 1958 collection Selected Stories by P. G. Wodehouse.

The 1938 anthology The Book of Laughter, published by Allied Newspapers, included this story, along with another Wodehouse short story, "Honeysuckle Cottage".

== Adaptations ==
This story was adapted into the Jeeves and Wooster episode "Wooster with a Wife", the sixth episode of the second series, which first aired on 19 May 1991. There are some changes in plot, including:

- In the episode, Bertie does not participate in a golf tournament; instead, Bobbie participates in a tennis tournament.
- Bertie initially tries to propose to Bobbie in the episode, though he changes his mind.
- In the original story, Clementina was sent to bed for putting sherbet in the ink to make it fizz; in the episode, Bobbie merely says Clementina is supposed to be in bed.
- In the episode, Bertie is not trying to assert his ability to handle matters himself by refusing advice from Jeeves; instead, Bertie simply does not have time to hear Jeeves's alternative scheme.
- In the episode, Bertie is startled by a dog and drops the flower-pot over the conservatory roof before he speaks to the policeman. The dog led the policeman to Bertie. Bertie is brought to jail, and is released when Jeeves and Miss Mapleton come to see him.
