= Very Good, Jeeves =

1930 short story collection by P. G. Wodehouse

- First US edition cover
- Author: P. G. Wodehouse
- Cover artist: James Montgomery Flagg
- Language: English
- Series: Jeeves
- Genre: Comedy
- Publisher: Doubleday, Doran
- Publication date: 20 June 1930
- Publication place: United Kingdom
- Preceded by: Carry On, Jeeves
- Followed by: Thank You, Jeeves

Very Good, Jeeves is a collection of eleven short stories by P. G. Wodehouse, all featuring Jeeves and Bertie Wooster. It was first published in the United States on 20 June 1930 by Doubleday, Doran, New York, and in the United Kingdom on 4 July 1930 by Herbert Jenkins, London. The stories had all previously appeared in Strand Magazine in the UK and in Liberty or Cosmopolitan magazines in the US between 1926 and 1930.

As well as Jeeves and his master Bertie Wooster, the stories also feature many regular characters, including Tuppy Glossop, Bingo Little, Bobbie Wickham, Aunt Dahlia, Aunt Agatha and Sir Roderick Glossop.

Bertie says the titular phrase four times in the collection.

== Contents ==
The original story titles and publication dates were as follows:

- "Jeeves and the Impending Doom" — Bertie reluctantly visits his Aunt Agatha, who has recently hired Bertie's friend Bingo Little to tutor her troublesome son Thomas. When Thomas lands Aunt Agatha's esteemed guest in danger, Bertie and Jeeves have to save both the guest and Bingo's job.
  - UK: Strand, December 1926
  - US: Liberty, 8 January 1927
- "The Inferiority Complex of Old Sippy" — Bertie's old friend Sippy, now an editor, is too intimidated to reject his old school head master's boring essays, or to confess his love for the poet Gwendolen Moon. For Sippy, Bertie proposes a plan involving a bag of flour. Meanwhile, Jeeves dislikes Bertie's new vase.
  - UK: Strand, April 1926
  - US: Liberty, 17 April 1926
- "Jeeves and the Yule-tide Spirit" — Jeeves is disappointed when Bertie cancels their trip to Monte Carlo to be with Bobbie Wickham, whom Bertie has fallen in love with, and to get revenge on Tuppy Glossop. Bobbie suggests a scheme for revenge involving a long stick, a darning needle, and a hot water bottle.
  - UK: Strand, December 1927
  - US: Liberty, 24 December 1927
- "Jeeves and the Song of Songs" — When Tuppy Glossop becomes practically engaged to a singer named Cora Bellinger, Aunt Dahlia wants them broken up. Jeeves comes up with a plan involving the song "Sonny Boy".
  - UK: Strand, September 1929
  - US: Cosmopolitan, September 1929 (as "The Song of Songs")
- "Episode of the Dog McIntosh" (US edition: "Jeeves and the Dog McIntosh") — After Bobbie gives away Aunt Agatha's dog McIntosh while trying to sell a play to a familiar American producer, it's up to Jeeves to figure out how to recover McIntosh before Aunt Agatha returns.
  - UK: Strand, October 1929 (as "Jeeves and the Dog McIntosh")
  - US: Cosmopolitan, October 1929 (as "The Borrowed Dog")
- "The Spot of Art" (US edition: "Jeeves and the Spot of Art") – Bertie is in love with the artist Gwladys Pendlebury, who has painted Bertie's portrait. However, Aunt Dahlia is confident that Jeeves will be able to split up Bertie and Gwladys, get rid of the painting, and make Bertie join Aunt Dahlia on her cruise.
  - UK: Strand, December 1929 (as "Jeeves and the Spot of Art")
  - US: Cosmopolitan, December 1929 (as "Jeeves and the Spot of Art")
- "Jeeves and the Kid Clementina" — Clementina, Bobbie Wickham's cousin, is away from school without leave, and Bertie tries to sneak her back into school unnoticed using a flower-pot and string, despite Jeeves's objections.
  - UK: Strand, January 1930
  - US: Cosmopolitan, January 1930
- "The Love That Purifies" (US edition: "Jeeves and the Love That Purifies") — Bertie's Aunt Dahlia bets that her son Bonzo can defeat Aunt Agatha's son Thomas in a Good Conduct contest.
  - UK: Strand, November 1929
  - US: Cosmopolitan, November 1929
- "Jeeves and the Old School Chum" — Bingo Little struggles to carry on after his wife's old school friend, Laura Pyke, starts enforcing her strong opinions about food on Bingo's diet.
  - UK: Strand, February 1930
  - US: Cosmopolitan, February 1930
- "Indian Summer of an Uncle" (US edition: "The Indian Summer of an Uncle") — Bertie is tasked by his Aunt Agatha with breaking up the relationship between his Uncle George and a young waitress.
  - UK: Strand, March 1930
  - US: Cosmopolitan, March 1930
- "The Ordeal of Young Tuppy" (US edition: "Tuppy Changes His Mind") — Tuppy Glossop falls in love with the athletic Miss Dalgleish, and plays rugby football to impress her. Aunt Dahlia wants Bertie and Jeeves to make sure that Tuppy reunites with her daughter, Angela Travers.
  - UK: Strand, April 1930
  - US: Cosmopolitan, April 1930

== Publication history ==
Along with The Inimitable Jeeves and Right Ho, Jeeves, Very Good, Jeeves was included in a collection titled Life With Jeeves, published in 1981 by Penguin Books.

== Bibliography ==
- Wodehouse, P. G. (2008) [1930]. Very Good, Jeeves (Reprinted ed.). Arrow Books. ISBN 978-0099513728.
