= Episode of the Dog McIntosh =

- Short story by P. G. Wodehouse
- Country: United Kingdom
- Language: English
- Genre: Comedy

Publication
- Publisher: The Strand Magazine (UK); Cosmopolitan (US)
- Media type: Print (Magazine)
- Publication date: October 1929

Chronology
- Series: Jeeves
Jeeves and the Song of Songs	The Spot of Art

"Episode of the Dog McIntosh" is a short story by P. G. Wodehouse, and features the young gentleman Bertie Wooster and his valet Jeeves. The story was published in The Strand Magazine as "Jeeves and the Dog McIntosh" in the United Kingdom in October 1929, and in Cosmopolitan as "The Borrowed Dog" in the United States that same month. The story was also included as the fifth story in the 1930 collection Very Good, Jeeves.

In the story, Bertie must look after his Aunt Agatha's dog McIntosh. Meanwhile, Roberta “Bobbie” Wickham wants Bertie's help to sell her mother's play to an American theatrical producer.

== Plot ==
Bertie is looking after his Aunt Agatha's Aberdeen Terrier, McIntosh. She tells him in a letter that she plans to pick up McIntosh in the evening. There is also another letter, from Bobbie Wickham. She wants Bertie to give lunch to her and two friends, and tells him to have plenty of sweets. Bobbie comes, and tells Bertie that an American theatrical manager named Blumenfeld and his young son are coming. The name sounds familiar to Bertie. Bobbie wants to sell Blumenfeld a play written by her mother. She plans to read the play to the Blumenfelds and wants to make the boy happy with sweets so that he will like the play; Blumenfeld takes his son's opinions seriously, since he thinks the child's intelligence is the same as an average audience's. With a yelp, Bertie remembers Blumenfeld and his son.

Bertie tells Jeeves that the Blumenfelds they saw in New York are coming to lunch. Bertie warns that if young Blumenfeld insults him as he did Cyril, Bertie will clump the child's head. On Jeeves's advice, Bertie is not present for lunch. Later, Bertie calls Jeeves from the Drones Club. Jeeves reports that the Blumenfelds have left, and Bobbie wants him to call her. Bertie does so, and she says that the child, buoyed by sweets, approved the play. She and Mr. Blumenfeld will sign a contract. Bobbie also says that the child adored Bertie's Aberdeen terrier, so Bobbie gave him the dog. Stunned, Bertie rushes home and tells Jeeves. Jeeves suggests that Bobbie, who is supposed to meet Blumenfeld in his suite, go to Blumenfeld's suite while he is out and let Bertie in, so Bertie can enter and use aniseed to lure the dog away.

Jeeves apprises Bobbie of the plan. Bertie meets Bobbie at Blumenfeld's hotel. She opens his suite and McIntosh, drawn to the scent of aniseed, follows Bertie home. Bertie praises Jeeves for his plan and rewards him with five pounds. Bertie realizes that Bobbie will be in trouble when the Blumenfelds discover that McIntosh is gone; at the same moment, the door bell rings. Jeeves says it is probably Mr. Blumenfeld, and advises Bertie to hide behind the settee. Bertie does so.

"Except to the eye of love, one Aberdeen terrier looks very much like another Aberdeen terrier, sir. Mr. Blumenfeld, I am happy to say, did not detect the innocent subterfuge."
"Jeeves," I said—and I am not ashamed to confess that there was a spot of chokiness in the voice—"there is none like you, none."

— Jeeves is praised by Bertie

Blumenfeld enters and smells aniseed. Jeeves tells him that Mr. Wooster is an eccentric who sprinkles aniseed on his trousers, and is easily stirred to violence. Afraid, Blumenfeld leaves, and Bertie thanks Jeeves. Jeeves explains that he told Bobbie to tell Blumenfeld that Bertie had taken the dog. Jeeves adds that, before he left, Blumenfeld paid Jeeves five pounds in exchange for the dog, though Jeeves actually gave him another Aberdeen terrier he purchased earlier. McIntosh is in Jeeves's room. Bertie praises Jeeves again and rewards him with another fifteen pounds. When Aunt Agatha calls to make sure McIntosh is all right, Bertie has no worries.

== Publication history ==
The story was illustrated by Charles Crombie in the Strand and by James Montgomery Flagg in Cosmopolitan.

"Episode of the Dog McIntosh" was included in the 1958 collection Selected Stories by P. G. Wodehouse, published by The Modern Library.

== Adaptations ==
The first episode of The World of Wooster was an adaptation of this story. The episode, titled "Jeeves and the Dog McIntosh", was originally broadcast in the UK on 30 May 1965.

This story was adapted into the Jeeves and Wooster episode "Tuppy and the Terrier", the second episode of the first series, which first aired on 29 April 1990. There are some changes in plot, including:

- In the episode, Bertie is initially against giving lunch to Bobbie, since he is still upset about the hot water bottle incident.
- In the original stories, the American theatrical manager's name was Blumenfield in "Jeeves and the Chump Cyril" and Blumenfeld (without an i) in "Episode of the Dog McIntosh". Despite being based on the latter story, this episode uses the earlier name Blumenfield.
- In the episode, Bertie does not know the Blumenfields. Bertie sneaks into Blumenfeld's suite without Bobbie's help.
- In the episode, when Aunt Agatha returns, Bertie does not know that Jeeves has switched the dogs and tries to stop her from reaching the room.
- While McIntosh is identified in the story (and in the episode) as an Aberdeen terrier, he is actually played by a West Highland White Terrier ("Westie").
