= Jeeves and the Old School Chum =

- Short story by P. G. Wodehouse
- Country: United Kingdom
- Language: English
- Genre: Comedy

Publication
- Publisher: The Strand Magazine (UK); Cosmopolitan (US)
- Media type: Print (Magazine)
- Publication date: February 1930

Chronology
- Series: Jeeves
The Love That Purifies	Indian Summer of an Uncle

"Jeeves and the Old School Chum" is a short story by P. G. Wodehouse, and features the young gentleman Bertie Wooster and his valet Jeeves. The story was published in The Strand Magazine in the United Kingdom in February 1930, and in Cosmopolitan in the United States that same month. The story was also included as the ninth story in the 1930 collection Very Good, Jeeves.

Bertie's friend Bingo Little appears in the story. He needs help from Bertie and Jeeves when his wife's old school friend, Laura Pyke, starts enforcing her strict ideas about what people should eat on Bingo's diet.

== Plot ==
"Laura Pyke," said young Bingo with intense bitterness, "is a food crank, curse her. She says we all eat too much and eat it too quickly and, anyway, ought not to be eating it at all but living on parsnips and similar muck. And Rosie, instead of telling the woman not to be a fathead, gazes at her in wide-eyed admiration, taking it in through the pores."

— Bingo resents Rosie's old school chum

Bertie visits Bingo Little, who has inherited a large income and country home. On the day of Bertie's departure, Bingo invites him to return for the Lakenham horse races, where he and his wife Rosie will picnic. Rosie tells Bingo that Laura Pyke, her old school friend whom she admired greatly as a child, plans to visit. Bertie leaves, and when he returns later, he finds Bingo upset. Laura Pyke criticizes how other people eat. Rosie hangs on her friend's every word, and now Bingo cannot get the food he wants. Bertie has dinner with the Littles and Pyke, who criticizes Bingo. Bertie is concerned that Pyke is souring Rosie's view of Bingo. Bertie asks Jeeves to think of a way to help Bingo.

On the day of the Lakenham races, Bertie expects Pyke will choose the picnic's food. He asks Jeeves, who is bringing his own sandwiches, to also bring some for him. Bingo, however, packs plenty of edible food in the luncheon basket. At the races, they realize no one brought the luncheon basket. Pyke says that lunch is better skipped anyway, and Rosie assents. Bertie discovers that Jeeves has brought enough sandwiches for himself, Bertie, and Bingo. The three of them eat in secrecy, then Jeeves says he removed the basket from the car before they started. He believes that missing lunch may make Rosie less sympathetic towards Pyke. Bertie doubts the plan.

As evening approaches, Rosie wants to go home. Bertie drives her and Pyke in the Littles' car. After a while, the car stops. Pyke notices that the car is out of fuel, and insults Bingo for not filling the tank. Rosie defends her husband. Bertie tries to acquire petrol from a nearby house, but the man there is not helpful. Bertie then wanders down the road, and sees his car, driven by Jeeves and containing Bingo. Bingo jumps out, tells Jeeves to wait five minutes, and walks up the road with Bertie, so that they can secretly listen as Rosie and Pyke argue loudly. Then Jeeves drives up, Bingo takes a tin of petrol from the car and hides it nearby, and Bertie and Bingo re-enter the car. They then drive up to Pyke and Rosie. Pyke commands Jeeves to drive her away.

Though Rosie is thankful Bingo came, she points out that Bingo should have filled the tank. Bingo says he did, claiming Pyke was mistaken, and that he will fix the car's real problem in a second. Bingo goes to the nearby house and intimidates the man into giving Rosie tea, impressing Rosie. While she is inside, Bertie and Bingo refuel the car with the hidden petrol. Bingo tells Bertie that he will never again doubt Jeeves, who had earlier let most of the petrol out of the tank.

== Style ==
Throughout the series, Bertie sometimes echoes Jeeves's speech patterns, reflecting the influence that Jeeves has over Bertie. For instance, in "Jeeves and the Old School Chum", Bertie says: "Then gradually, by degrees—little by little, if I may use the expression—disillusionment sets in."

Wodehouse uses a number of stylistic devices to create humour through repetition. One of the more obvious is repetition between Bertie's narration and dialogue. For example, this occurs in "Jeeves and the Old School Chum":

I couldn't follow him. The old egg seemed to be speaking in riddles.
"You seem to me, old egg," I said, "to speak in riddles. Don't you think he speaks in riddles, Jeeves?"

There are 17 instances of such straightforward repetition between narration and dialogue in the Jeeves series, though this particular device is so obvious that it may seem to be more prominent.

== Publication history ==
The story was illustrated by Charles Crombie in the Strand and by James Montgomery Flagg in Cosmopolitan.

"Jeeves and the Old School Chum" was included in the 1932 collection Nothing But Wodehouse and in the 1958 collection Selected Stories by P. G. Wodehouse. It was also featured in the 1985 collection A Wodehouse Bestiary, a collection of animal-related short stories by Wodehouse.

The American edition of the story appears to contain an editing error, since the British term "petrol" was changed to "gas(oline)" in the American edition, but "dickey" was left unchanged. The word appears in the quote: "Bingo and Mrs. Bingo in their car, and the Pyke in mine, with Jeeves sitting behind in the dickey". The word should have been changed to the corresponding American term, "rumble seat".

== Adaptations ==
The story was adapted for an episode of The World of Wooster. The episode, titled "Jeeves and the Old School Chum", was the third episode of the third series. It was originally broadcast in the UK on 20 October 1967.

This story was not adapted into any Jeeves and Wooster episode.
