= Jeeves and Wooster in Perfect Nonsense =

2013 play by David & Robert Goodale

- Written by: David Goodale; Robert Goodale
- Genre: Comedy

Premiere
- Date: 30 October 2013
- Place: Duke of York's Theatre

Jeeves and Wooster in Perfect Nonsense is a play written by David and Robert Goodale based on the 1938 novel The Code of the Woosters by P. G. Wodehouse. After try-out performances at the Richmond Theatre and the Theatre Royal, Brighton in October 2013, the play opened later that month at the West End's Duke of York's Theatre. The production won the Laurence Olivier Award for Best New Comedy in 2014.

== Plot ==
The plot revolves around Bertie Wooster deciding to stage a one-man show revolving around his recent experiences at a country house called Totleigh Towers (the events of The Code of the Woosters), only to discover, as he is starting the show, that he needs help to tell the story. He enlists his valet Jeeves to assist on very short notice, though Jeeves anticipated that Bertie would need help and has prepared some scenery. Jeeves has also asked Seppings, the butler of Bertie's aunt, to help stage the production. Problems arise both in the story Bertie is narrating and the play as it is being performed, and Jeeves intervenes to make sure all ends well.

In addition to narrating, Bertie plays himself in the story. Jeeves and Seppings each play multiple characters. In addition to playing himself, Jeeves plays Sir Watkyn Bassett, an imposing silver-collector who, as a magistrate, once fined Bertie five pounds for stealing a policeman's helmet as a prank; Madeline Bassett, Sir Watkyn's excessively sentimental daughter; Gussie Fink-Nottle, a shy young man who studies newts and is engaged to Madeline; and Stiffy Byng, the scheming ward and niece of Sir Watkyn Bassett. Seppings plays himself as well as Bertie's Aunt Dahlia, the genial, loud-voiced woman who employs Seppings; Roderick Spode, a crony of Bassett and aspiring dictator; Constable Oates, the local policeman who feuds with Stiffy Byng over her dog; Butterfield, the polite butler employed by Bassett; and an unnamed antique-shop proprietor who sells a cow-creamer to Bassett.

In the story recounted by Bertie, Bertie's uncle, a collector of silver and rival to Sir Watkyn Bassett, has arranged to buy a silver cow-creamer, but Bassett acquires the object first by underhanded means. Bertie's Aunt Dahlia tells Bertie to go Bassett's country house, Totleigh Towers, to steal the cow-creamer. She gets Bertie to agree by threatening to withhold her brilliant chef's cooking if he refuses, though Bertie is nervous about Bassett and his intimidating associate Spode, who are both suspicious of Bertie. Meanwhile, a rift occurs between Bertie's friend Gussie and Gussie's fiancée Madeline. This puts Bertie in danger since Madeline incorrectly believes Bertie wants to marry her, and he is expected to marry her if she drops Gussie. Gussie secretly writes insults about Bassett and Spode in a notebook, but loses the notebook and worries about what will happen if they read it. Stiffy Byng schemes to get her uncle's approval to marry a penniless curate whom she loves, and to divest her enemy Constable Oates of his helmet.

Despite various challenges and mishaps, Bertie manages to tell the story of his weekend at Totleigh Towers with the assistance of Jeeves and Seppings. The conflicts in Bertie's narrative are resolved and the story is concluded. Lastly, Bertie, Jeeves, and Seppings perform a comical Charleston dance routine.

== Production history ==
Perfect Nonsense was written by brothers David and Robert Goodale and is based on P. G. Wodehouse's 1938 novel The Code of the Woosters. In June 2013, it was announced the show would be performed for the first time in October that year, with tickets going on sale immediately. The first authorized stage play based on Jeeves and Wooster was directed by Sean Foley, with design by Alice Power, lighting by James Farncombe and sound design by Max and Ben Ringham. The show had pre-West End try-outs at Richmond Theatre (10–19 October) and the Theatre Royal, Brighton (22–26 October) before beginning previews at the Duke of York's Theatre, London on 30 October, with the official opening night on 12 November 2013. The lead roles of Jeeves and Wooster were played by Matthew Macfadyen and Stephen Mangan. Initially booking to 8 March 2014, the production was later extended by six months to 20 September, with Macfadyen and Mangan continuing in their roles until 5 April, before being replaced by Mark Heap and Robert Webb on 7 April 2014.

John Gordon Sinclair and James Lance took over the roles of Jeeves and Wooster from 30 June 2014 and on the subsequent national tour, with the play's co-writer Robert Goodale replacing Mark Hadfield as Seppings. It was announced on 18 August 2014 that the show would close in the West End on 20 September 2014.

On 20 February 2014, it was announced that Perfect Nonsense would tour the UK, beginning at the Yvonne Arnaud Theatre, Guildford on 24 September. It would continue to Cambridge, Newcastle, Norwich, Reading, Salford, Cheltenham, Southampton, Glasgow and Bath, where it would finish in December. The third West End cast would tour the production with John Gordon Sinclair as Jeeves, James Lance as Wooster, and Perfect Nonsense co-writer Robert Goodale as Seppings. The tour would continue in February, with Jason Thorpe taking over as Jeeves and Robert Webb returning to the role of Wooster, with Christopher Ryan taking over as Seppings. It would visit Shrewsbury, Oxford, Sheffield, Harrogate, Chichester, Birmingham, Canterbury, Belfast, Malvern, Milton Keynes, Nottingham, Woking, Truro, Edinburgh, Salisbury, Leeds and Cardiff, where it would finish in June.

The tour continued in September 2015, with co-writer Robert Goodale, returning as Seppings, Joseph Chance as Jeeves, and Matthew Carter as Wooster. The tour would visit Bury St. Edmunds, Aylesbury, Buxton, Crewe, Mold, Worthing, Exeter, Northampton, Ipswich, Southend, Colchester, Inverness, Dundee, Kingston and Derby, finishing in November.

In January 2016, Perfect Nonsense opened at The National Centre For Performing Arts in Mumbai with Robert Goodale as Seppings, Joseph Chance as Jeeves, and Matthew Carter as Wooster.

In June 2016, it was announced that Perfect Nonsense would embark on an international tour with Robert Goodale as Seppings, Joseph Chance as Jeeves and Matthew Carter as Wooster. The tour began at Sydney Opera House, Followed by, Adelaide, Wellington, Hong Kong, Singapore, Chennai and Bangalore, finishing in November 2016.

On 21 March 2019, the first North American production of Perfect Nonsense opened at Hartford Stage (in Hartford, Connecticut), continuing through 20 April 2019. Chandler Williams played Bertie Wooster, Arnie Burton played Jeeves, and Eddie Korbich played Seppings. The production had the same director as the original production, Sean Foley, and the same designer, Alice Power.

A UK tour began on 18 February 2020 and was originally scheduled to run through 31 May 2020, with Matthew Cavendish as Bertie Wooster, Andrew Ashford as Jeeves, and Andrew Cullum as Seppings. On 18 March 2020, it was announced that the rest of the tour was cancelled due to the COVID-19 pandemic. The production was remounted in June and July 2021 with the same cast, though some performances were cancelled because of the pandemic.

In September & October 2023 a production of Jeeves and Wooster A Perfect Nonsense will be co-produced by Salisbury Playhouse and the Octagon Theatre Bolton. Directed by Marieke Audsley and Designed by Olivia du Monceau.

== Roles and original cast ==
Character	Original pre and West End cast	Second West End cast	Third West End and original UK tour cast	2023 Salisbury and Bolton Co-Production cast
Jeeves	Matthew Macfadyen	Mark Heap	John Gordon Sinclair	Patrick Warner
Bertie Wooster	Stephen Mangan	Robert Webb	James Lance	Luke Barton
Seppings	Mark Hadfield	Mark Hadfield	Robert Goodale	Alistair Cope

== Awards and nominations ==
=== London production ===
Year	Award	Category	Nominee	Result	Ref
2014	Whatsonstage.com Awards	Best New Comedy		Nominated	
2014	Laurence Olivier Award	Best New Comedy		Won	
