= The Love That Purifies =

"The Love that Purifies"
- Short story by P. G. Wodehouse
- Country: United Kingdom
- Language: English
- Genre: Comedy

Publication
- Publisher: The Strand Magazine (UK); Cosmopolitan (US)
- Media type: Print (Magazine)
- Publication date: November 1929

Chronology
- Series: Jeeves
Jeeves and the Kid Clementina	Jeeves and the Old School Chum

"The Love that Purifies" is a short story by P. G. Wodehouse, and features the young gentleman Bertie Wooster and his valet Jeeves. The story was published in The Strand Magazine in the United Kingdom in November 1929, and in Cosmopolitan in the United States that same month, as "Jeeves and the Love that Purifies". The story was also included as the eighth story in the 1930 collection Very Good, Jeeves.

The story concerns a Good Conduct contest between Bertie's young cousins, Bonzo Travers, the son of Bertie's Aunt Dahlia, and Thomas Gregson, the son of Bertie's Aunt Agatha.

== Plot ==
Jeeves leaves for his annual holiday to go shrimping in Bognor. Bertie's friend Sippy, who is engaged to Gwendolen Moon, wants Bertie to stay with him to keep Gwendolen's young brother Sebastian occupied. Bertie, who does not like Sebastian, instead visits his Aunt Dahlia at her home, Brinkley Court. Aunt Dahlia's son Bonzo is there, as is Anstruther, a family friend, and Lord and Lady Snettisham. The son of Bertie's Aunt Agatha, Thomas ("Thos"), is also present. Anstruther has offered a Good Conduct prize of five pounds to whichever boy behaves the best. Thos, who is normally troublesome, is behaving very well; this upsets Aunt Dahlia, because she has bet that Bonzo would win the contest, while Lady Snettisham bet on Thos. Aunt Dahlia bet her valuable chef Anatole against the Snettisham's kitchen-maid.

The Snettishams try to bribe Bonzo to misbehave, though they fail because he loves the actress Lillian Gish and wants to be worthy of her. Aunt Dahlia wants to take revenge by sabotaging Thos. She asks Bertie to pose the problem to Jeeves. As Jeeves is away, Bertie proposes to handle the problem himself. Bertie tries to insult Thos, to entice him into misbehaving by exacting revenge on Bertie, but Thos remains well-behaved. Later, Thos earns bonus points in the contest after he performs a good deed. Bertie and Aunt Dahlia are confounded, and Bertie admits that they need Jeeves. He wires for Jeeves to come.

"Jeeves! Don't tell me Thos. is in love with Greta Garbo?"
"Yes, sir. Unfortunately such is the case. He gave me to understand that it had been coming on for some time, and her last picture settled the issue. His voice shook with an emotion which it was impossible to misread. I gathered from his observations, sir, that he proposes to spend the remainder of his life trying to make himself worthy of her."

— Jeeves explains Thos's good behaviour

Without complaint, Jeeves cuts his vacation short and comes. He suggests that Aunt Dahlia invite Sebastian Moon to visit. Sebastian is an outspoken child, and Jeeves feels that Thos will not tolerate insults from a boy younger than him. Bertie writes to his friend Sippy, and Sebastian arrives two days later. However, Thos continues to behave well. Jeeves tells Bertie he has discovered the true reason for Thos's good conduct: Thos loves the actress Greta Garbo. Later, Bertie sees Thos chasing Sebastian with a bucket of water. Thos tries to splash water onto Sebastian but hits Anstruther instead. Anstruther then angrily chases Thos with a stick. Jeeves explains that he told Sebastian to insult Greta Garbo, and Sebastian eagerly obliged, since he finds her inferior to the actress Clara Bow. Bertie, astonished by the passion of the younger generation, is pleased with Jeeves. He tells Jeeves to return to Bognor, and that he can stay there another fortnight.

== Publication history ==
The story was illustrated by Charles Crombie in the Strand and by James Montgomery Flagg in Cosmopolitan.

The 1932 collection Nothing But Wodehouse, published by Doubleday, and the 1958 collection Selected Stories by P. G. Wodehouse, published by The Modern Library, included the story.

== Adaptations ==
An episode of The World of Wooster adapted the story. The episode, titled "Jeeves and the Love That Purifies", was the sixth episode of the third series. It was originally broadcast in the UK on 10 November 1967.

This story was not adapted into any Jeeves and Wooster episode.
