= Jeeves and the Greasy Bird =

- Short story by P. G. Wodehouse
- Country: United Kingdom
- Language: English
- Genre: Comedy

Publication
- Publisher: Playboy (US); Argosy (UK)
- Media type: Print (Magazine)
- Publication date: December 1965 (US); January 1967 (UK)
- Series: Jeeves

"Jeeves and the Greasy Bird" is a short story by English humorist P. G. Wodehouse, and features the young gentleman Bertie Wooster and his valet Jeeves. The story was published in Playboy magazine in the United States in December 1965, and in Argosy magazine in the United Kingdom in January 1967. The story was also included in the 1966 collection Plum Pie.

In the story, Bertie tries to help his new friend Sir Roderick Glossop, and gets into trouble involving the theatrical agent Jas Waterbury and Waterbury's niece Trixie.

== Plot ==
Bertie returns from seeing Sir Roderick Glossop, who once disliked Bertie but is now friendly. Roderick's fiancée Myrtle refuses to marry while Roderick's daughter, Honoria, is unmarried. Dahlia Travers, Bertie's aunt, tells Bertie that Blair Eggleston, who writes for her weekly paper, loves Honoria but is too shy to say it. Aunt Dahlia asks Bertie to play Santa Claus at her Christmas party, but Bertie refuses. Jeeves supports Bertie's decision, which impresses Bertie because he turned down Jeeves's request for them to visit Florida after Christmas, because Bertie does not want to miss the Drones Club Darts Tournament.

Wanting to help Sir Roderick, Bertie kisses Honoria in front of Eggleston, to spur Eggleston to confess his feelings. Bertie tells this to Aunt Dahlia, who then gets a call from Honoria. She was engaged to Eggleston, but he broke the engagement when Bertie kissed her. She will now marry Bertie. Bertie does not want to marry her, but also does not want to hurt her feelings by refusing. Jeeves advises pretending to be engaged to someone else.

Bertie decides to hire an actress through a theatrical agent to pretend to be his fiancée. He chooses the greasy-headed agent Jas Waterbury, who recommends his niece Trixie. At the Drones Club, Bertie is troubled to hear from Catsmeat Potter-Pirbright that Jas cheated two of Bertie's fellow Drones, Oofy Prosser and Freddie Widgeon. While sharing an embrace with Trixie, Bertie is discovered, but by Eggleston, not Honoria. Bertie tells him that he and Trixie are engaged, but it hardly matters, since Eggleston and Honoria reconciled already. Jas tells Bertie to marry Trixie, since Bertie has named her as his fiancée. Bertie refuses, but Jas hints at threatening a breach of promise case. Jas expects Bertie to pay him tomorrow. Aunt Dahlia discusses with Jeeves how to help Bertie.

"I represent Messrs. Alsopp and Wilson, wine merchants, goods supplied to the value of three hundred and four pounds, fifteen shillings and eightpence, a bill which Mr. Wooster finds it far beyond his fiscal means to settle. I am what is technically known as the man in possession."
A hoarse "Gorblimey" burst from Jas's lips. I thought it rather creditable of him that he did not say anything stronger.

— Jeeves pretends to be a broker's man

Before Jas enters Bertie's flat, Jeeves tells Bertie to hide behind the piano. Then Jeeves lies to Jas, claiming to be in Bertie's flat as the man in possession, or broker's man, for a wine company. (This means that Bertie's creditors have a legal right to Bertie's property until his debt is paid; Jeeves is employed to take possession of the property and watch over it until Bertie pays off his debt.) This stuns Jas, who thought Bertie was wealthy. Jeeves adds that Bertie is dependent on his aunt, Mrs. Travers, and that he pretends to be Bertie's valet so that Bertie will not get in trouble with his aunt.

Aunt Dahlia enters, acting shocked to find out that Jeeves is a broker's man, and declares that she will send Bertie off to Canada, with nothing left to pay Jas. Convinced that he can get no money from Bertie, Jas leaves. Bertie thanks Jeeves and Aunt Dahlia, and reluctantly agrees to play Santa Claus for his aunt, but Jeeves suggests that Sir Roderick would make a better Santa Claus. Aunt Dahlia agrees. Grateful to Jeeves, Bertie gives up the Darts Tournament for a trip to Florida.

== Style ==
One of the stylistic devices used by Wodehouse is the transferred epithet, applying an adjective to a noun instead of using the corresponding adverb to modify the verb. An example of this can be seen in this story: "'I take it, Jeeves', I said as I started to pick at a moody fried egg, 'that Aunt Dahlia has told you all."

In contrast to the manner in which an employer would normally be expected to address his valet, Bertie often speaks in a deferential tone to Jeeves when asking for help. This can be seen in "Jeeves and the Greasy Bird":

"Oh, Jeeves," I said, "I hope I'm not interrupting you when you were curled up with Spinoza's Ethics or whatever it is, but I wonder if you could spare me a moment of your valuable time."
"Certainly, sir."

The story presents a rare instance of Jeeves telling an actual joke, which he does while pretending to be a broker's man. Claiming that Bertie is financially dependent on Aunt Dahlia and that she would send Bertie to Canada if she discovered his debts, Jeeves says, "Should she learn of my official status, I do not like to envisage the outcome, though if I may venture on a pleasantry, it would be a case of outgo rather than outcome for Mr. Wooster". The humour of the pun derives not from the joke itself but through Jeeves's restraint in telling the joke.

Throughout the stories, Bertie picks up vocabulary and speech patterns from Jeeves, reflecting the control that Jeeves exerts over Bertie, whereas Jeeves rarely borrows from Bertie's speech. For example, Bertie says the following in "Jeeves and the Greasy Bird", employing language often used by Jeeves: "I am not a disobliging man, Jeeves. If somebody wanted me to play Hamlet, I would do my best to give satisfaction."

== Background ==
Before writing the final version of a story, Wodehouse wrote what he termed a "scenario", a manuscript of preliminary notes for the story. There are two surviving scenarios for "Jeeves and the Greasy Bird". In the earlier scenario, dated 28 November 1965, the story starts with Bertie about to leave for the Drones Club, instead of returning from visiting Sir Roderick Glossop as in the final story. Jeeves still wants to catch a tarpon in the scenario, but Aunt Dahlia asks Bertie to hire a conjuror (magician) for her Christmas party. It is for this reason that Bertie visits Jas Waterbury's theatrical agency, and there is no mention of Jas threatening Bertie with a breach of promise case. Bertie then visits Sir Roderick Glossop, who tells Bertie he cannot marry Lady Chuffnell until Honoria is engaged. Blair Eggleston, who is Glossop's patient, loves Honoria, but she dislikes him. The scenario simply ends with the note, "This ends Act One".

The second scenario, dated just six days later, 4 December 1965, starts with Bertie and Jeeves in New York. Aunt Dahlia asks Bertie by telephone to come play Santa Claus, and wants Bertie to visit Wilfred Cream, the playboy character mentioned in Jeeves in the Offing, who is Sir Roderick Glossop's patient at his clinic in Chuffnell Regis. Bertie then learns that Wilfred has fallen for Honoria and reformed, and endeavours to get her engaged to Wilfred so Sir Roderick can marry Lady Chuffnell. This scenario ends with the note, "The story now proceeds as in the original version". In one draft of the story, Roderick Spode featured prominently in the plot, and was the one who ended up playing Santa Claus.

The final version of the collection Plum Pie sent to its publisher, Herbert Jenkins, shows minor changes made by Wodehouse. The following quote, spoken by Jeeves, shows an example of one of these final changes made by Wodehouse: "If your allusion is to the American poet John Howard Payne, sir, he compared it to its advantage with pleasures and palaces. He [called it sweet and] said there was no place like it" (phrase in brackets added). Another example: "'Should she learn of my official status, I do not like to envisage the outcome. If I may venture on a pleasantry...'" (becomes "...the outcome, though if I may venture..."). Both of these changes make Jeeves's language more elaborate. There is also an example of a change made to Bertie's speech: "'Heaven help the tarpon that tries to pits its feeble cunning against you, Jeeves.' I said. 'It will be a one-sided contest'" (becomes "Its efforts will be bootless").

== Publication history ==
The story was illustrated by Bill Charmatz in Playboy. It was illustrated by Belinda Lyon in Argosy.

Since the story was not written until long after 1931, it was not included in the first edition of the Jeeves Omnibus, a 1931 collection of all the Jeeves short stories from the three earlier collections The Inimitable Jeeves, Carry On, Jeeves and Very Good, Jeeves. "Jeeves and the Greasy Bird" was later included, along with "Jeeves Makes an Omelette", in the second edition of the omnibus, which was titled The World of Jeeves and published in 1967.

== Adaptations ==
An episode of The World of Wooster adapted the story. The episode, titled "Jeeves and the Greasy Bird", was the first episode of the third series. It was originally broadcast in the UK on 6 October 1967.

The story was adapted into part of the Jeeves and Wooster episode "Honoria Glossop Turns Up", the third episode of the fourth series, which first aired in the UK on 30 May 1993. There are minor differences in plot, including:

- The episode takes place in New York rather than London. There is no mention of Christmas or a darts tournament in the episode.
- In the episode, Glossop's previous wife left him for a conductor, whereas in the original story, Glossop was a widower.
- Myrtle is called Mrs. Snap in the episode; she was Lady Chuffnell, aunt of Bertie's friend Chuffy, in the original story.
- In the episode, Aunt Dahlia does not appear; it is Bingo Little who tells Bertie about Eggleston's feelings. Furthermore, in the episode, Eggleston is a doctor rather than a writer, and he punches Bertie when he finds him with Trixie. Trixie is not actually Jas's niece but his girlfriend in the episode.
- The scene where Jeeves pretends to be a broker's man and Aunt Dahlia pretends to be an overbearing aunt is excluded entirely; instead, Bertie and Jeeves escape trouble by jumping off an ocean liner.
