= The World of Wooster =

British TV comedy series (1965–1967)

- Genre: Comedy
- Based on: P. G. Wodehouse's Jeeves stories
- Written by: Richard Waring; Michael Mills
- Starring: Ian Carmichael; Dennis Price
- Country of origin: England
- Original language: English
- No. of series: 3
- No. of episodes: 20

Production
- Producers: Michael Mills; Peter Cotes; Frank Muir

Original release
- Network: BBC1
- Release: 30 May 1965 – 17 November 1967

Related
- The World of Wodehouse

Ian Carmichael (left) as Bertie Wooster and Dennis Price as Jeeves

The World of Wooster is a comedy television series, based on the Jeeves stories by author P. G. Wodehouse. The television series starred Ian Carmichael as English gentleman Bertie Wooster and Dennis Price as Bertie's valet Jeeves.

The series aired on BBC Television from 1965 until 1967 in three series.

Like many other British television series of the time, much of the series was lost as a result of wiping. All but two episodes are now lost. In 2018, the series was included at #51 in a list of the top 100 most wanted missing television programmes by television archivist organisation Kaleidoscope.

== Cast members ==
=== Principal cast ===
- Ian Carmichael as Bertie Wooster
- Dennis Price as Jeeves

=== Recurring cast ===
- Derek Nimmo as Bingo Little (5 episodes)
- Eleanor Summerfield as Aunt Dahlia (5 episodes)
- Fabia Drake as Aunt Agatha (4 episodes)

== Background and production ==
The series was produced by Michael Mills, Peter Cotes, and Frank Muir, with music by Sandy Wilson. The episodes were adapted from the stories of P. G. Wodehouse by Richard Waring and producer Michael Mills.

Twenty episodes, each about 30 minutes long, were made for the series. Minimal, economical sets were used, and Bertie's apartment had a contemporary design, including a central staircase and intricate screen door.

In some ways, the interpretations of Bertie Wooster and Jeeves in the series differ from how the characters are described in Wodehouse's stories. Ian Carmichael portrayed Bertie Wooster with the nervous mannerisms that he had earlier brought to affable, bewildered characters in comedy films such as Lucky Jim, and added a stammer and a monocle, both non-canonical, to the character. He was also significantly older than the canonical Bertie Wooster. Dennis Price portrayed Jeeves as an older, stiff, dignified figure, regarding himself as superior to the proceedings around him, rather than being more involved like the canonical Jeeves. Additionally, changes were made to the dialogue and situations to increase the tension between Jeeves and Aunt Agatha.

The series was successful, but after twenty episodes, Carmichael and others believed that they had adapted all the stories suitable for television. A serial adaptation of the Jeeves novel The Code of the Woosters was considered, though the idea of changing the series from an anthology to serial format was rejected. Instead, another series, The World of Wodehouse, was created to adapt other short stories written by Wodehouse.

== Theme song ==
The theme song, "What Would I Do Without You Jeeves?" was sung (in character) by series lead Ian Carmichael. An extended single version also featuring Dennis Price as Jeeves was released with another in-character song by Carmichael, "Bertie's Lucky Day" on the b-side.

== Episodes ==
=== Series overview ===
Series	Episodes	Originally released	
Series	Episodes	First released	Last released
1	6	30 May 1965	4 July 1965
2	7	4 January 1966	15 February 1966
3	7	6 October 1967	17 November 1967

=== Series 1 (1965) ===
No. overall	No. in series	Title	Adaptation of	Original release date
1	1	"Jeeves and the Dog McIntosh"	"Episode of the Dog McIntosh"	30 May 1965
Guest appearances: Tracy Reed as Bobbie Wickham, Peter Stephens as Mr. Blumenfeld, Addison Fordyce as Master Blumenfeld
2	2	"Jeeves, the Aunt and the Sluggard"	"The Aunt and the Sluggard"	6 June 1965
Guest appearances: Desmond Walter-Ellis as Biffy, Athene Seyler as Aunt Isabel
3	3	"Jeeves and the Great Sermon Handicap"	"The Great Sermon Handicap"	13 June 1965
Guest appearances: Timothy Carlton as Claude, Simon Ward as Eustace, Simon Carter as Steggles, Arthur Ridley as the Rev. Heppenstall
4	4	"Jeeves and the Song of Songs"	"Jeeves and the Song of Songs"	20 June 1965
Guest appearances: Edwin Apps as Tuppy Glossop, Mo Dwyer as Cora Bellinger, Eleanor Summerfield as Aunt Dahlia
5	5	"Jeeves and the Hero's Reward"	"Scoring off Jeeves"	27 June 1965
Guest appearances: Fabia Drake as Aunt Agatha, Derek Nimmo as Bingo Little, Joanna Rigby as Honoria Glossop, Neville Martin as Oswald Glossop, Paul Whitsun-Jones as Sir Roderick Glossop
6	6	"Jeeves and the Inferiority Complex of Old Sippy"	"The Inferiority Complex of Old Sippy"	4 July 1965
Guest appearances: Philip Gilbert as Sippy, Kynaston Reeves as Mr. Waterbury

=== Series 2 (1966) ===
No. overall	No. in series	Title	Adaptation of	Original release date
7	1	"Jeeves and the Delayed Exit of Claude and Eustace"	"Sir Roderick Comes to Lunch" and "The Delayed Exit of Claude and Eustace"	4 January 1966
Guest appearances: Timothy Carlton as Claude, Simon Ward as Eustace, Fabia Drake as Aunt Agatha, Jennie Woodford as Marion Wardour
8	2	"Jeeves and the Change of Mind"	"Bertie Changes His Mind" and "Jeeves and the Kid Clementina"	11 January 1966
Guest appearances: Tracy Reed as Bobbie Wickham, Janet Hannington as Peggy Mainwaring, Kathleen Marsden as Clementina, Mary Hinton as Miss Tomlinson, Barbara French as Mrs. Scholfield
9	3	"Jeeves and the Spot of Art"	"The Spot of Art"	18 January 1966
Guest appearances: Eleanor Summerfield as Aunt Dahlia, Jill Curzon as Gwladys, Ronnie Stevens as Lucius Pim
10	4	"Jeeves Exerts the Old Cerebellum"	"Jeeves in the Springtime"	25 January 1966
Guest appearances: Derek Nimmo as Bingo Little, Willoughby Goddard as Mortimer Little
11	5	"Jeeves and the Purity of the Turf"	"The Purity of the Turf	1 February 1966
Guest appearances: Simon Carter as Steggles, James Wardroper as Harold, Arthur Howard as the Rev. Mr. Heppenstall
12	6	"Jeeves and the Clustering Around Young Bingo"	"Clustering Round Young Bingo"	8 February 1966
Guest appearances: Derek Nimmo as Bingo Little, Eleanor Summerfield as Aunt Dahlia, Deborah Stanford as Mrs. Little
13	7	"Jeeves and the Indian Summer of an Uncle"	"Indian Summer of an Uncle"	15 February 1966
Guest appearances: Max Adrian as Uncle George, Fabia Drake as Aunt Agatha, Beryl Reid as Mrs. Wilberforce, Penny Morrell as Rhoda

=== Series 3 (1967) ===
No. overall	No. in series	Title	Adaptation of	Original release date
14	1	"Jeeves and the Greasy Bird"	"Jeeves and the Greasy Bird"	6 October 1967
Guest appearances: Julian Holloway as Blair Eggleston, Joanna Rigby as Honoria Glossop, Eleanor Summerfield as Aunt Dahlia, Sydney Tafler as Jas Waterbury, Janet Webb as Trixie Waterbury
15	2	"Jeeves and the Stand-in for Sippy"	"Without the Option"	13 October 1967
Guest appearances: Keith Smith as Sippy, Gaye Brown as Heloise Pringle, Paul Whitsun-Jones as Sir Roderick Glossop
16	3	"Jeeves and the Old School Chum"	"Jeeves and the Old School Chum"	20 October 1967
Guest appearances: Deborah Stanford as Mrs. Little, Derek Nimmo as Bingo Little, Joanna Wake as Laura Pyke
17	4	"Jeeves and the Impending Doom"	"Jeeves and the Impending Doom"	27 October 1967
Guest appearances: Fabia Drake as Aunt Agatha, Colin Gordon as the Rt. Hon. A. B. Filmer, Derek Nimmo as Bingo Little, Timothy Horton as Thomas
18	5	"Jeeves and the Hard-Boiled Egg"	"Jeeves and the Hard-boiled Egg"	3 November 1967
Guest appearances: Anton Rodgers as Bicky Bickersteth, Felix Aylmer as the Duke of Chiswick
19	6	"Jeeves and the Love That Purifies"	"The Love That Purifies"	10 November 1967
Guest appearances: Anthony Kemp as Sebastian Moon, Erik Chitty as Mr. Anstruther, Timothy Horton as Thomas Gregson, Eleanor Summerfield as Aunt Dahlia, Gary Smith as Bonzo Travers
20	7	"Jeeves and the Fixing of Freddie"	"Fixing it for Freddie"	17 November 1967
Guest appearances: Julian Holloway as Freddie Bullivant, Gabrielle Drake as Elizabeth Vickers, Lynnette Meredith as Tootles

== Reception ==
The series was distributed worldwide. It won awards for best script and comedy in 1965 from the Guild of Television Producers and Directors.

Wodehouse initially felt that Carmichael would be fine as Bertie Wooster, but later believed that Carmichael overacted; however, Wodehouse was satisfied enough with Carmichael's performance to later ask him to portray Bertie or Jeeves in a musical comedy. Carmichael declined, feeling he was too old to play Bertie again and that public perception prevented him from playing Jeeves. Wodehouse was more positive about Price's portrayal as Jeeves, stating that Price was the best Jeeves he had ever seen.
