= Clustering Round Young Bingo =

- Short story by P. G. Wodehouse
- Country: United Kingdom
- Language: English
- Genre: Comedy

Publication
- Publisher: Saturday Evening Post (US); The Strand Magazine (UK)
- Media type: Print (Magazine)
- Publication date: February 1925 (US); April 1925 (UK)

Chronology
- Series: Jeeves
Fixing it for Freddie	Bertie Changes His Mind

"Clustering Round Young Bingo" is a short story by P. G. Wodehouse, and features the young gentleman Bertie Wooster and his valet Jeeves. The story was published in the Saturday Evening Post in the United States in February 1925, and in The Strand Magazine in the United Kingdom in April 1925. The story was also included in the 1925 collection Carry On, Jeeves.

In the story, the wife of Bertie's friend Bingo Little wants a new housemaid, Bertie's Aunt Dahlia wants a new cook, and Bingo is worried about an embarrassing article his wife is writing about him for Aunt Dahlia's magazine.

== Plot ==
Bertie writes an article called "What the Well-Dressed Man is Wearing" for his Aunt Dahlia's magazine, Milady's Boudoir. Jeeves approves of the article, except he disagrees with Bertie's assertion that silk shirts are worn with evening dress. Bertie, however, has ordered a dozen silk shirts, in spite of Jeeves. Changing the subject, Bertie mentions that his friends Bingo Little and Bingo's wife Rosie are looking for a better housemaid. Bertie then goes to deliver his article to the offices of Milady's Boudoir and sees Mrs. Little there. She asks Bertie to dine with her and Bingo, along with Bertie's aunt and uncle. Bertie eagerly accepts, because the Littles have an exceptional French cook, Anatole. Next, Bertie sees his genial aunt, Dahlia Travers. She has asked Jeeves to find her a better cook for her husband Tom Travers, so that he will fund her paper.

Bingo sighed heavily.
"Oh, all right," he said. "I suppose it's a case of the surgeon's knife. All right, Jeeves, you may carry on. Yes, carry on, Jeeves. Yes, yes, Jeeves, carry on."

— Bingo agrees to give up Anatole

At the Little home next evening, the meal is sublime, and Bertie's uncle enjoys it. When Bertie returns to his flat, Jeeves says that Bertie's uncle, George Travers, plans to go to Harrogate to recover his health and wants Bertie to accompany him, but Bertie declines. Bingo appears the next morning, and tells Bertie and Jeeves that Rosie is writing an embarrassing article about their married life, "How I Keep the Love of My Husband-Baby", for Milady's Boudoir. Jeeves proposes that he persuade Anatole to work for Mrs. Travers; Mrs. Little will never forgive Mrs. Travers for stealing her cook, and she will refuse to contribute the embarrassing article to her paper. Though reluctant to give up Anatole, Bingo consents.

Jeeves reports that Anatole refuses to leave, because he is in love with Mrs. Little's parlourmaid. As a substitute plan, Bingo persuades Bertie to sneak in and steal the cylinder from Rosie's dictating machine. Later, Bertie sneakily enters Bingo's house, but, startled by a Pekingese dog, makes a lot of noise. He meets a policeman and parlourmaid outside, but manages to run away.

Jeeves advises Bertie to join his Uncle George at Harrogate, to avoid more of Bingo's schemes. At Harrogate, Bertie encounters Aunt Dahlia and Uncle Tom. Aunt Dahlia says that Rosie will no longer write for her, but she is happy because she has Anatole. Bertie, confused, returns to London, and asks Jeeves about this. Jeeves had learned that Anatole had once played with the feelings of Aunt Dahlia's housemaid. Knowing this, Jeeves arranged for this housemaid to work for Mrs. Little, and Anatole left to avoid the housemaid. Jeeves has been well rewarded: he received twenty pounds from Bingo, twenty-five from Aunt Dahlia, ten from Rosie, twenty-five from Uncle Tom, and ten from Uncle George. Bertie gives Jeeves five more pounds, and Jeeves thanks him. When Jeeves says he sent the new silk shirts back, Bertie does not object.

== Style ==
Bertie frequently uses two or three alternative words together to describe the same thing, such as in "Clustering Round Young Bingo", when he uses three equivalent terms when describing a maid's clumsiness: "The one now in office apparently runs through the objets d'art like a typhoon, simoom, or sirocco".

"Clustering Round Young Bingo" is one of the stories in which Jeeves keeps some of his actions and motives secret from Bertie, according to Kristin Thompson. At the end of the story, Jeeves tells Bertie about how he solved the various servant problems, and about the money he was rewarded with from the householders involved. He also mentions getting money from Bertie's Uncle George, whom Jeeves had persuaded Bertie to join at Harrogate:

"Don't tell me that Uncle George gave you something, too! What on earth for?"
"Well, really, sir, I do not quite understand myself. But I received a cheque for ten pounds from him. He seemed to be under the impression that I had been in some way responsible for your joining him at Harrogate, sir."

Jeeves was indeed responsible for Bertie going to Harrogate, though he avoids stating this directly. The reader can infer that Uncle George either offered Jeeves ten pounds to persuade Bertie to join him, or that Jeeves at least strongly anticipated a reward due to something George had said. Yet Jeeves cannot tell Bertie this, so he makes an ambiguous comment about Uncle George's reward which Bertie cannot interpret, but the reader can.

== Publication history ==
The story was illustrated by H. J. Mowat in the Saturday Evening Post and by A. Wallis Mills in the Strand.

The American edition of the 1939 collection The Week-End Wodehouse and the 1958 collection Selected Stories by P. G. Wodehouse included this story.

== Adaptations ==
An episode of The World of Wooster adapted the story. The episode, titled "Jeeves and the Clustering Around Young Bingo", was the sixth episode of the second series. It was originally broadcast in the UK on 8 February 1966.

This story was not adapted for any Jeeves and Wooster episode.
