= Indian Summer of an Uncle =

Short story by P. G. Wodehouse

- Short story by P. G. Wodehouse
- Country: United Kingdom
- Language: English
- Genre: Comedy

Publication
- Publisher: The Strand Magazine (UK); Cosmopolitan (US)
- Media type: Print (Magazine)
- Publication date: March 1930

Chronology
- Series: Jeeves
Jeeves and the Old School Chum	The Ordeal of Young Tuppy

"Indian Summer of an Uncle" is a short story by P. G. Wodehouse, and features the young gentleman Bertie Wooster and his valet Jeeves. The story was published in The Strand Magazine in the United Kingdom in March 1930, and in Cosmopolitan in the United States that same month. The story was also included as the tenth story in the 1930 collection Very Good, Jeeves.

In the story, Bertie is instructed by his Aunt Agatha to keep her brother, Bertie's Uncle George, from marrying a young waitress.

== Plot ==
"A Miss Platt, sir. Miss Rhoda Platt. Of Wisteria Lodge, Kitchener Road, East Dulwich."
"Young?"
"Yes, sir."
"The old fathead!"
"Yes, sir. The expression is one which I would, of course, not have ventured to employ myself, but I confess to thinking his lordship somewhat ill-advised."

— Jeeves and Bertie discuss Uncle George and Rhoda

Bertie is visited by his Uncle George, who has the title Lord Yaxley. Uncle George intends to get married. After Uncle George leaves, Bertie tells the news to Jeeves, but Jeeves already knows. Jeeves is acquainted with the young woman Uncle George intends to marry, Rhoda Platt. Bertie and Jeeves disapprove of Uncle George's plan to marry a young woman, though Jeeves allows that Uncle George is experiencing a burst of youth, which Jeeves calls an Indian summer. When Jeeves tells Bertie that Rhoda is a waitress, Bertie is certain his class-conscious Aunt Agatha will disapprove. Just then, Aunt Agatha shows up. She wants the match stopped. Aunt Agatha keeps Bertie from ringing for Jeeves, since she is against involving a servant in a family matter. She says the family must pay the girl to leave Uncle George, as they once did many years ago, when he fell in love with a barmaid. She gives Bertie a cheque for Rhoda.

Bertie goes to the girl's home. He meets the girl's genial aunt, but does not have the nerve to try to pay Rhoda off. He returns to Aunt Agatha, who is unhappy with his failure. Jeeves enters, and Bertie asks for his advice, despite Aunt Agatha's disapproval. Jeeves proposes that Uncle George will have second thoughts if he meets Rhoda's aunt, who will continue to live with Rhoda after Rhoda's marriage. Aunt Agatha dismisses Jeeves and berates Bertie for involving him. Bertie decides to follow Jeeves's plan anyway, and arranges for Rhoda's aunt and his uncle to come to his flat. Bertie asks how Jeeves knows about Rhoda. Jeeves says he knows a valet named Smethurst. Smethurst wants to marry Rhoda, who is torn between her love for Smethurst and her ambition to marry a man with a title.

Jeeves announces Rhoda's aunt, Mrs. Wilberforce. She stuns Bertie by telling him how she used to work as a barmaid, and was once engaged to a George Wooster. Bertie, worried, tries to call lunch off, but Uncle George appears. Mrs. Wilberforce and Uncle George are thrilled to see each other. Bertie flees to the Drones Club, where he gets a call from Aunt Agatha. Aunt Agatha, surprisingly, sounds cheerful; she says that Uncle George has decided to marry Mrs. Wilberforce, a woman closer to his own age. For the time being, Aunt Agatha mistakenly believes Mrs. Wilberforce belongs to a prominent family. Bertie hangs up and confronts Jeeves. Jeeves says Smethurst asked him to break up Rhoda and Uncle George, and that Mrs. Wilberforce and Uncle George are well suited to each other. Jeeves suggests they take a trip to avoid Aunt Agatha. Bertie agrees.

== Publication history ==
The story was illustrated by Charles Crombie in the Strand and by James Montgomery Flagg in Cosmopolitan.

"Indian Summer of an Uncle" was included in the 1932 collection Nothing But Wodehouse.

== Adaptations ==
An episode of The World of Wooster adapted the story. The episode, titled "Jeeves and the Indian Summer of an Uncle", was the seventh episode of the second series. It was originally broadcast in the UK on 15 February 1966.

This story was adapted into the Jeeves and Wooster episode "The Purity of the Turf", the third episode of the first series, which first aired on 6 May 1990. There are some changes in plot, including:

- In the episode, Jeeves does not say that Uncle George is experiencing an Indian summer, or temporarily renewed youth.
- In the episode, Bertie does not ask Jeeves for advice in front of Aunt Agatha.
- In the original story, Aunt Agatha advises Bertie to pay Rhoda one hundred pounds, but gives him a blank cheque and authorizes Bertie to pay a higher sum if necessary; in the episode, she gives him a cheque for a hundred pounds and says it should be ample.
