= Jeeves and the Song of Songs =

- Short story by P. G. Wodehouse
- Country: United Kingdom
- Language: English
- Genre: Comedy

Publication
- Publisher: The Strand Magazine (UK); Cosmopolitan (US)
- Media type: Print (Magazine)
- Publication date: September 1929

Chronology
- Series: Jeeves
Jeeves and the Yule-tide Spirit	Episode of the Dog McIntosh

"Jeeves and the Song of Songs" is a short story by P. G. Wodehouse, and features the young gentleman Bertie Wooster and his valet Jeeves. The story was published in The Strand Magazine in the United Kingdom in September 1929, and in Cosmopolitan in the United States that same month. The story was also included as the fourth story in the 1930 collection Very Good, Jeeves.

In the story, Tuppy Glossop becomes romantically involved with an opera singer named Cora Bellinger. Bertie's Aunt Dahlia wants the pair broken up. To accomplish this, Jeeves devises a plan that involves the song "Sonny Boy".

== Plot ==
Bertie is singing "Sonny Boy" in the bath when Jeeves tells him that Tuppy Glossop has come to see him. Bertie slips on some towels, and greets Tuppy, who says he is practically engaged to an opera singer, Cora Bellinger. She dislikes practical jokes, and heard about the time Tuppy tricked Bertie into falling into the Drones Club swimming pool. Tuppy asks Bertie to tell Cora that the incident never happened, and Bertie reluctantly agrees. Later, Tuppy brings Cora to Bertie's place for lunch. Tuppy fawns over Cora, though Bertie does not care for her.

You see, I held strong views on "Sonny Boy". I considered it a song only to be attempted by a few of the elect in the privacy of the bathroom. And the thought of it being murdered in open Oddfellows' Hall by a man who could treat a pal as young Tuppy had treated me that night at the Drones sickened me.

— Bertie reveres the song "Sonny Boy"

Tuppy tells Bertie that their friend "Beefy" Bingham, a parson, runs a clean recreational establishment in the East End. Tuppy has been volunteering at Beefy's establishment to please Cora. She will sing at Beefy's next entertainment. To impress her, Tuppy will also be there to soulfully sing "Sonny Boy"; this shocks Bertie, who holds strong views on the song. When Jeeves informs Bertie that Bertie's Aunt Dahlia is coming, Tuppy quickly leaves. Aunt Dahlia arrives and says that her daughter Angela has had her heart broken by Tuppy, who left her for Cora. Aunt Dahlia wants Tuppy to go back to Angela. Bertie asks Jeeves to think of a plan. When Aunt Dahlia returns the next day, Jeeves has a plan. He believes Cora will lose interest in Tuppy if he is unpopular with Beefy's audience. Jeeves suggests that Bertie sing "Sonny Boy" first, so that the audience will be tired of the song by the time Tuppy performs. Bertie tries to refuse but eventually agrees.

At the entertainment, Bertie is intimidated by the tough-looking audience. He sees Jeeves, who, to keep Tuppy from realizing Jeeves's plan, has advised Tuppy to remain at the "Jug and Bottle" bar across the road until he appears. Jeeves suggests that Bertie go to another bar, the "Goat and Grapes". After drinking there, Bertie feels more courageous and returns. He sings "Sonny Boy", and afterwards tells Jeeves that the crowd did not seem pleased. Jeeves explains that the song had been performed twice already. Bertie feels betrayed, but then Tuppy sings. The crowd shouts and throws food at Tuppy. Tuppy flees. Then Beefy takes the stage, and says that the next performer, Cora, will be late because her car broke down. She is now coming in a cab.

Bertie clutches at Jeeves, shocked that Cora was not there to see Tuppy's failure. Jeeves agrees that the scheme has gone awry. Upset, Bertie leaves, though Jeeves remains for the rest of the show. Later that night, Bertie is visited at home by Tuppy, who has a black eye. Tuppy says Cora is not right for him. He has Bertie call Aunt Dahlia for him, then goes to see Angela. Jeeves enters, and tells Bertie what happened. Upon Cora's arrival, Jeeves had told Cora that Tuppy wanted her to sing "Sonny Boy". The crowd did not react well, and she, thinking Tuppy had played a joke on her, punched Tuppy in the eye. Impressed, Bertie regards Jeeves reverently.

== Publication history ==
The story was illustrated by Charles Crombie in the Strand and by James Montgomery Flagg in Cosmopolitan, in which it was titled "The Song of Songs".

The 1932 collection Nothing But Wodehouse and the 1958 collection Selected Stories by P. G. Wodehouse included the story. The story was also featured in the 1960 collection The Most of P. G. Wodehouse, and in the 1983 collection P. G. Wodehouse Short Stories, published by The Folio Society with drawings by George Adamson.

"Jeeves and the Song of Songs" appeared in the 1929 anthology Literary Treasures of 1929, published by Hearst's International Cosmopolitan Magazine. The story was included in the 1940 anthology Bedside Book of Famous British Stories, published by Random House. This anthology was reissued with the title An Anthology of Famous British Stories by Modern Library in 1952. The 1960 anthology Fifty Modern Stories, published by Row, Peterson & Company, featured the story.

== Adaptations ==
An episode of The World of Wooster adapted the story. The episode, titled "Jeeves and the Song of Songs", was the fourth episode of the first series. It was originally broadcast in the UK on 20 June 1965.

This story was adapted into the Jeeves and Wooster episode "Tuppy and the Terrier", the second episode of the first series, which first aired on 29 April 1990. There are some changes in plot, including:

- In the episode, Bertie meets Cora at an opera theatre rather than at lunch in his flat.
- There is no mention of the incident at the Drones Club pool in the episode. Tuppy merely asks Bertie to tell Cora he is serious-minded.
- In the episode, Bertie does not go to a pub to drink before performing at Beefy's entertainment. Bertie is also somewhat less stunned when hearing that Cora is not present at the entertainment; he does not clutch at Jeeves.
- In the original story, Cora brings a doll onto the stage to sing to; she does not do this in the episode.
- Tuppy does not talk to Bertie after the entertainment in the episode. Instead, Bertie hears about his reconciliation with Angela from Aunt Dahlia.
