= Aunt Dahlia =

Fictional character in P. G. Wodehouse stories

- Jeeves character
- First appearance: "Clustering Round Young Bingo" (1925)
- Last appearance: Aunts Aren't Gentlemen (1974)
- Created by: P. G. Wodehouse
- Portrayed by: See below

In-universe information
- Full name: Dahlia Travers née Wooster
- Gender: Female
- Occupation: Proprietor of Milady's Boudoir
- Family: Agatha Gregson (sister); George Wooster, Lord Yaxley (brother); Henry Wooster (brother; deceased); Bertie Wooster's father (brother; deceased)
- Spouse: Tom Travers
- Children: Angela Travers; Bonzo Travers
- Relatives: Bertie Wooster (nephew); Many others (see the list of Bertie's relatives)
- Nationality: British

Dahlia Travers (née Wooster) is a recurring fictional character in the Jeeves stories of English comic writer P. G. Wodehouse, being best known as Bertie Wooster's bonhomous, red-faced Aunt Dahlia. She is much beloved by her nephew, in contrast with her sister, Bertie's Aunt Agatha.

Proprietor of the weekly newspaper for women Milady's Boudoir, she is married to Tom Travers, mother of Angela Travers and Bonzo Travers, and employs the supremely gifted French chef Anatole at her country house, Brinkley Court.

Aside from Jeeves and Bertie Wooster, Aunt Dahlia appears in more Jeeves novels, and more Jeeves stories overall, than any other character. She makes an appearance in fourteen Jeeves stories, including seven novels and seven short stories. Only Aunt Agatha and Bingo Little appear in more Jeeves short stories (eight and ten, respectively).

== Inspiration ==
Wodehouse spent much of his youth with his many aunts and uncles, as his parents were generally away in Hong Kong. The character of Aunt Dahlia was inspired by one of Wodehouse's aunts, Louisa Deane. Louisa Deane was the sister of Wodehouse's mother, Eleanor Deane, and Mary Bathurst Deane, who inspired the character of Aunt Agatha.

== Life and character ==
Dahlia Travers lives at Brinkley Court outside Market Snodsbury in Worcestershire. She is married to Tom Travers, and has two children, Angela Travers and Bonzo Travers. She appears to have been married sometime once before, since Bertie says that she "married old Tom Travers en secondes noces, as I believe the expression is, the year Bluebottle won the Cambridgeshire". Bertie enjoys her company, and says of her, "There are few males or females whose society I enjoy more than that of this genial sister of my late father". She is "a large, genial soul", and Bertie praises "her humanity, sporting qualities, and general good-eggishness". Though typically friendly, she is capable, with effort, of going into an authoritative "grande dame act" if the situation calls for it, assuming a serious expression and cold, aristocratic tone. While she generally has reasonable objectives, she has no objection to resorting to methods such as burglary or blackmail in order to achieve those goals.

Described as being built along the lines of Mae West, Aunt Dahlia is short and solid, with a reddish complexion. According to Bertie, her face takes on a purple tinge in moments of strong emotion. She wears tortoiseshell-rimmed spectacles for reading, and appears to style her hair carefully, as her hair is variously described as her "carefully fixed coiffure", "her Marcel-wave", and "her perm".

Her most notable personal characteristic is her loud, carrying voice. Riding in her youth for years with such fox-hunting packs as the Quorn and the Pytchley, she tends to address Bertie, over the phone or indoors, as if "shouting across ploughed fields in a high wind." She sometimes uses hunting cries in regular speech, including "Yoicks!", "Tally ho!", "Gone away!", and "Hark forrard!". She once put her carrying voice to use at a village concert, in which she sang "Every Nice Girl Loves A Sailor" while wearing a sailor suit. Her performance was well received. As she tells Bertie, "I had them rolling in the aisles. Three encores, and so many bows that I got a crick in my back."

Dahlia employs the French chef Anatole, whose cooking is revered by many characters, especially her husband Tom and her nephew Bertie Wooster. Bertie is quick to accept an invitation to Brinkley Court for the chance to enjoy Anatole's cooking, and she uses the promise of his cooking to get Bertie to do various tasks for her. Her butler is Seppings. Before Seppings, Aunt Dahlia employed a butler named Pomeroy, a noble fellow, and before him, Murgatroyd, who turned out to be a thief. Aunt Dahlia has a large, sleepy black cat called Augustus, or "Gus".

In "Clustering Round Young Bingo", Aunt Dahlia hires the incomparable chef Anatole. In "Jeeves and the Song of Songs", she wants Tuppy Glossop, who has broken his engagement to Angela Travers for the opera singer Cora Bellinger, to go back to Angela. In "The Spot of Art", she wants Bertie to accompany her on a cruise. In "The Love That Purifies", her son Bonzo competes against her nephew Thomas ("Thos"), Aunt Agatha's son, in a good conduct contest. In "The Ordeal of Young Tuppy", she again wants Tuppy Glossop, who has fallen for the athletic Miss Dalgleish, to return to Angela.

As a Governor of Market Snodsbury Grammar School, she asks Bertie in Right Ho, Jeeves to award prizes and give a speech at the school, though Bertie pushes this task onto Gussie Fink-Nottle, whom Aunt Dahlia always calls "Spink-Bottle". In the same novel, Dahlia lost the money to pay her magazine's printers at baccarat and has Bertie and Jeeves help her get more money from her husband. In The Code of the Woosters, she asks Bertie to sneer at a silver cow-creamer, and after Sir Watkyn Bassett unfairly obtains the object, she tasks Bertie with stealing the cow-creamer from Sir Watkyn. In Jeeves and the Feudal Spirit, she temporarily pawns her pearl necklace to buy a serial from Daphne Dolores Morehead to help sell the Milady's Boudoir to the newspaper magnate Mr. Trotter. In "Jeeves Makes an Omelette", a story that takes place before the sale of her magazine, she asks Bertie to steal a painting so she can get a story for her magazine.

In Jeeves in the Offing, she hires Sir Roderick Glossop to pretend to be a butler at Brinkley Court so he can investigate the sanity of a man courting her goddaughter Phyllis Mills. In Stiff Upper Lip, Jeeves, she tells Bertie about how Sir Watkyn Bassett bragged about obtaining a black amber statuette. In "Jeeves and the Greasy Bird", a story that takes place before the sale of Milady's Boudoir, the writer Blair Eggleston writes for the magazine, and Aunt Dahlia and Jeeves save Bertie from the underhanded theatrical agent Jas Waterbury. In Much Obliged, Jeeves, she provides her house as a base of operations for the candidacy of Harold "Ginger" Winship, and she wants the businessman L. P. Runkle to pay Tuppy money that she feels Runkle owes him.

She last appears in Aunts Aren't Gentlemen, in which she places a bet on a horse, and intends to ensure that her wager is successful with a plan that involves kidnapping a cat. Though Bertie thinks highly of his Aunt Dahlia, he decides that her moral code is not as strict as his. In any event, she wins her wager.

=== Relationship with Bertie Wooster ===
Bertie refers to Aunt Dahlia as his "good and deserving aunt", in contrast to his unfriendly Aunt Agatha. Unlike Aunt Agatha, she seems to enjoy Bertie's company. Dahlia dandled Bertie on her knee when he was very young, and once saved him from swallowing a rubber comforter. When Bertie had measles as a child, Aunt Dahlia played tiddlywinks with him for hours and let him win, though Bertie maintains that his victories were due to his own skill.

Bertie and Aunt Dahlia often call each other terms that others might find insulting in an endearing way, as when Bertie calls her "aged relative" and "old ancestor", and she calls him "young blot" and "abysmal chump". Dahlia's telegram conversations with Bertie can display some rough love; for instance, in Right Ho, Jeeves, after Bertie dumped his prize-giving duty on an unsuspecting Gussie Fink-Nottle and sent him to Brinkley Court, she sent:

« Am taking legal advice to ascertain whether strangling an idiot nephew counts as murder. If it doesn't look out for yourself. Consider your conduct frozen limit. What do you mean by planting your loathsome friends on me like this? Do you think Brinkley Court is a leper colony or what is it? Who is this Spink-Bottle? Love. Travers. »

And a few telegrams later, she sent:

« Well, all right. Something in what you say, I suppose. Consider you treacherous worm and contemptible, spineless cowardly custard, but have booked Spink-Bottle. Stay where you are, then, and I hope you get run over by an omnibus. Love. Travers. »

Nevertheless, she genuinely cares for Bertie. Bertie acknowledges that her love for him is deep-rooted, and at the end of The Code of the Woosters, she is willing to give up her valuable chef Anatole in order to help Bertie, which profoundly moves him.

Aunt Dahlia is also on good terms with Bertie's valet Jeeves. Though at first she doubts his abilities, she quickly learns to appreciate his skill for solving problems. She thinks that Jeeves has a great deal of influence over Bertie's life, as she is certain that Jeeves will decide Bertie's fate in a number of ways in "The Spot of Art". Notably, she wants Jeeves to vet an article about men's dress trousers for Milady's Boudoir in The Code of the Woosters, she and Jeeves plan together how to extricate Bertie from trouble without discussing it with Bertie in "Jeeves and the Greasy Bird", and Jeeves serves as substitute butler for her at Brinkley Court when Bertie is not there in Stiff Upper Lip, Jeeves.

== Appearances ==
Aunt Dahlia is featured in many Jeeves stories, across much of Wodehouse's writing career:

- Carry on, Jeeves (1925)
  - "Clustering Round Young Bingo" (1925)
- Very Good, Jeeves (1930)
  - "Jeeves and the Song of Songs" (1929)
  - "The Spot of Art" (1929)
  - "The Love That Purifies" (1929)
  - "The Ordeal of Young Tuppy" (1930)
- Right Ho, Jeeves (1934)
- The Code of the Woosters (1938)
- Jeeves and the Feudal Spirit (1954)
- A Few Quick Ones (1959)
  - "Jeeves Makes an Omelette" (1958)
- Jeeves in the Offing (1960)
- Stiff Upper Lip, Jeeves (1963)
- Plum Pie (1967)
  - "Jeeves and the Greasy Bird" (1965)
- Much Obliged, Jeeves (1971)
- Aunts Aren't Gentlemen (1974)

Aunt Dahlia or her Milady's Boudoir are mentioned in several stories, including:

- Mr Mulliner Speaking (1929)
  - "The Awful Gladness of the Mater" (1925) – Mr Mulliner story (mention of Milady's Boudoir)
- Thank You, Jeeves (1934)
- Joy in the Morning (1946)

== Milady's Boudoir ==
Milady's Boudoir is a fictional weekly newspaper for women, of which Aunt Dahlia is the proprietor. According to Bertie, each issue costs sixpence. Milady's Boudoir is probably based on The Lady, Britain's oldest weekly women's magazine. (Note: The Lady was managed by David Freeman-Mitford, the father-in-law of Sir Oswald Mosley who inspired another Wodehouse character, Roderick Spode.) In the story Clustering Round Young Bingo, the office of Milady's Boudoir is described as being located in "one of those rummy streets in the Covent Garden neighbourhood", the same part of London as The Lady, which between 1885 and 2019 was headquartered in Bedford Street, Covent Garden.

Milady's Boudoir (and not "Madame's Nightshirt", as Dahlia's husband Tom Travers insists on calling it) never sold well and only stayed in business because Tom Travers reluctantly paid the bills. Aunt Dahlia ran the paper for three (according to Bertie) or four (according to Dahlia and Bertie) years before selling the magazine to Mr Trotter of Liverpool in Jeeves and the Feudal Spirit. In the following novel Jeeves in the Offing, the magazine "had recently been sold to a mug up Liverpool way", and Dahlia mentions that there was a short story in each issue, adding that "in seventy per cent of those short stories the hero won the heroine's heart by saving her dog or her cat or whatever foul animal she happened to possess."

Contributors

- Bertie Wooster contributed an article, titled "What the Well-Dressed Man is Wearing", in "Clustering Round Young Bingo", and proudly mentions it in other stories.
- Rosie M. Banks wrote an article, "How I Keep the Love of my Husband-Baby", though this article was not published, in "Clustering Round Young Bingo".
- Lady Bablockhythe contributed her Frank Recollections of a Long Life as a serial in "Clustering Round Young Bingo".
- Pomona Grindle was commissioned to contribute a serial in The Code of the Woosters.
- Cornelia Fothergill contributed her latest romance novel as a serial in "Jeeves Makes an Omelette".
- Daphne Dolores Morehead, the famous novelist, was commissioned to write a serial in Jeeves and the Feudal Spirit.
- Blair Eggleston wrote a series of articles on The Modern Girl in "Jeeves and the Greasy Bird".

== Adaptations ==
Television

- Eleanor Summerfield portrayed Aunt Dahlia in BBC One's black-and-white The World of Wooster (1965–1967).
- In the 1990-1993 television series Jeeves and Wooster, Aunt Dahlia was portrayed by a different actress in each series: Brenda Bruce in series 1, episodes 2, 4–5; by Vivian Pickles in series 2, episode 1; by Patricia Lawrence in series 3, episode 6; and by Jean Heywood in series 4, episode 4.

Radio

- Aunt Dahlia was voiced by Jean Stanley in the 1956 BBC BBC Light Programme radio dramatisation of Right Ho, Jeeves.
- In the 1973–1981 radio drama series What Ho! Jeeves, Aunt Dahlia was voiced by Vivian Pickles, who later portrayed her in an episode of the Jeeves and Wooster television series.
- Aunt Dahlia was voiced by Anne Jameson in the 1988 BBC radio adaptation of Right Ho, Jeeves.
- In the 1997 L.A. Theatre Works radio adaptation of The Code of the Woosters, Aunt Dahlia was voiced by Rosalind Ayres.
- In BBC Radio 4's 2006 adaptation of The Code of the Woosters for its Classic Serial series, she was voiced by Carolyn Pickles.
- Joanna Lumley voiced Aunt Dahlia in the 2018 BBC radio adaptation of Stiff Upper Lip, Jeeves.

Stage

- Aunt Dahlia was originally one of the characters in the 1975 musical Jeeves. She was portrayed in early performances by Betty Marsden. The character was cut from the musical before the show's London production.
- She is portrayed by another character in the 2013 play Jeeves and Wooster in Perfect Nonsense. In the play, her butler Seppings helps Bertie and Jeeves reenact the events of The Code of the Woosters. She is portrayed by Seppings.

== See also ==
- List of Jeeves characters, an alphabetical list of Jeeves characters
- List of P. G. Wodehouse characters in the Jeeves stories, a categorized outline of Jeeves characters
- List of Jeeves and Wooster characters, a list of characters in the television series
