= Bertie Wooster =

Fictional character in P. G. Wodehouse humorous stories

- Jeeves character
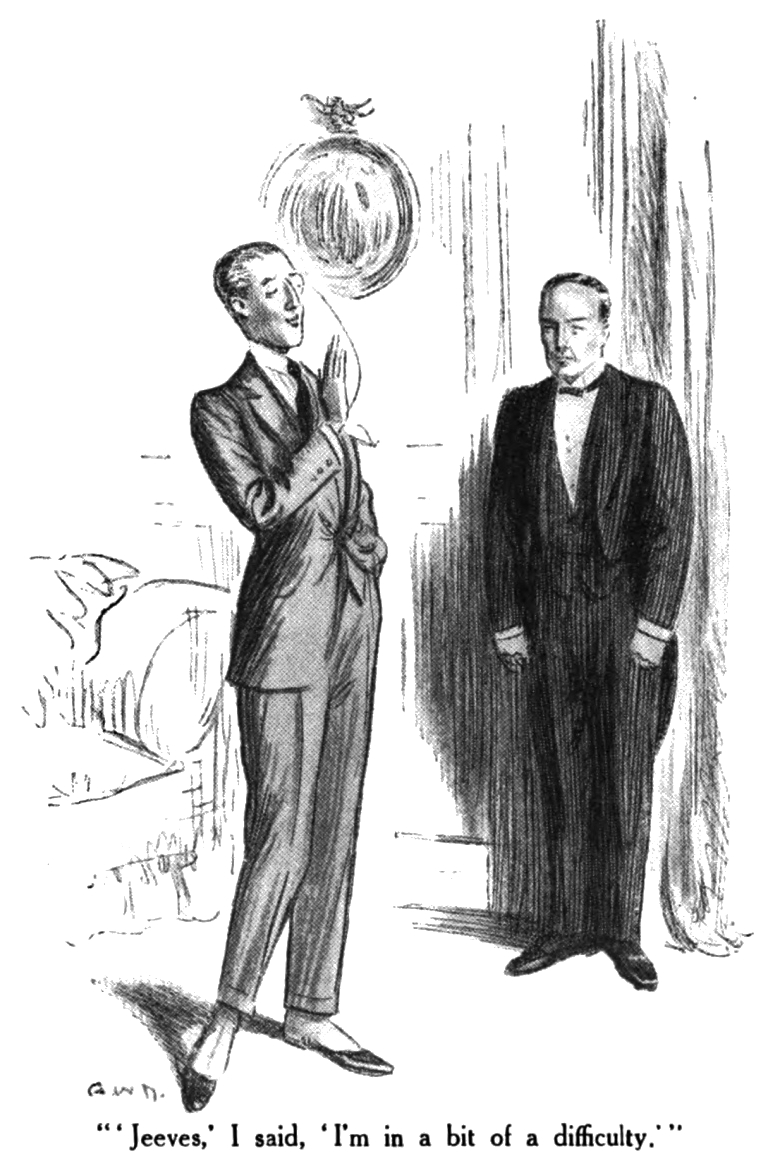
- Bertie Wooster and Jeeves, 1922 illustration by A. Wallis Mills
- First appearance: "Extricating Young Gussie" (1915)
- Last appearance: Aunts Aren't Gentlemen (1974)
- Created by: P. G. Wodehouse
- Portrayed by: See

In-universe information
- Aliases: Eustace H. Plimsoll; Ephraim Gadsby; Alpine Joe
- Nickname: Bertie
- Gender: Male
- Occupation: Socialite, idle rich
- Family: Mrs Scholfield (sister)
- Relatives: George Wooster, Lord Yaxley (uncle); Henry Wooster (uncle); Willoughby Wooster (uncle); Thomas "Thos" Gregson (cousin); Dahlia Travers (aunt); Agatha Gregson (aunt); Claude Wooster (cousin); Eustace Wooster (cousin); Harold Wooster (cousin); Angela Travers (cousin); Bonzo Travers (cousin); Thomas Travers (uncle); Three nieces; A sister he talks about earlier in the stories, but never appears again. (Bertie denies to Lord Chuffnell in Thank You, Jeeves that he ever had a sister.)
- Nationality: English
- Education: Eton College; Magdalen College, Oxford

Bertram Wilberforce Wooster is a fictional character in the comedic Jeeves stories created by British author P. G. Wodehouse. An amiable English gentleman and one of the "idle rich", Bertie appears alongside his valet, Jeeves, whose intelligence manages to save Bertie or one of his friends from numerous awkward situations. Bertie Wooster and Jeeves have been described as "one of the great comic double-acts of all time".

Bertie is the narrator and central figure of most of the Jeeves short stories and novels. The two exceptions are the short story "Bertie Changes His Mind" (1922), which is narrated by Jeeves, and the novel Ring for Jeeves (1953), a third-person narration in which Bertie is mentioned but does not appear. First appearing in "Extricating Young Gussie" in 1915, Bertie is the narrator of ten novels and over 30 short stories, his last appearance being in the novel Aunts Aren't Gentlemen, published in 1974.

== Inspiration ==
The Wodehouse scholar Norman Murphy believes George Grossmith Jr. to have been the inspiration for the character of Bertie Wooster. Others have asserted John Wodehouse, 3rd Earl of Kimberley, was the inspiration. P. G. Wodehouse was a distant cousin of John Wodehouse. He was also the godfather to the 3rd Earl's son, John Wodehouse, 4th Earl of Kimberley.

The Wodehouse character Reggie Pepper was an early prototype of Bertie Wooster.

== Fictional biography ==
=== Early life ===
Bertie Wooster and his friend Bingo Little were born in the same village only a few days apart. Bertie's middle name, "Wilberforce", is the doing of his father, who won money on a horse named Wilberforce in the Grand National the day before Bertie's christening and insisted on his son carrying that name. The only other piece of information given about Bertie's father, aside from the fact that he had numerous relatives, is that he was a great friend of Lord Wickhammersley of Twing Hall. Bertie refers to his father as the "guv'nor", and seems to have had a friendly relationship with him.

When he was around seven years of age, Bertie was sometimes compelled to recite "The Charge of the Light Brigade" for guests by his mother; she proclaimed that he recited nicely, but Bertie disagrees, and says that he and others found the experience unpleasant. Bertie also mentions reciting other poems as a child, including "Ben Battle" and works by Walter Scott. Like Jeeves, Bertie says that his mother thought him intelligent. Bertie makes no other mention of his mother, though he makes a remark about motherhood after being astounded by a friend telling a blatant lie: "And this, mark you, a man who had had a good upbringing and had, no doubt, spent years at his mother's knee being taught to tell the truth."

When Bertie was eight years old, he took dancing lessons (alongside Corky Potter-Pirbright, sister of Bertie's friend Catsmeat Potter-Pirbright). Bertie later becomes very good at dancing, being the favourite to win the Drones Club Dancing Competition in Jeeves and the Feudal Spirit. It is established throughout the series that Bertie is an orphan who inherited a large fortune at some point, although the exact details and timing of his parents' deaths are never made clear.

=== Education ===
Bertie Wooster's early education took place at the semi-fictional Malvern House Preparatory School, headed by Rev. Aubrey Upjohn, whom he meets again in Jeeves in the Offing. (Wodehouse himself attended a school by that name, in Kearsney, Kent, but the Malvern House that appears in the stories is in the fictional town of Bramley-on-Sea.) At Malvern House, Bertie's friends called him "Daredevil Bertie", though Upjohn and others called him "Bungling Wooster".

One detail of Bertie's Malvern House life that comes into several stories is his winning of the prize for scripture knowledge. Bertie speaks with pride of this achievement on several occasions, but in Right Ho, Jeeves, his friend Gussie Fink-Nottle, while intoxicated, publicly accuses Bertie of having won the award by cheating. Bertie stoutly denies this charge, however, and on the same occasion, Gussie makes other completely groundless accusations against other characters. Despite his pride over his accomplishment, Bertie does not remember precisely what the prize was, simply stating that it was "a handsomely bound copy of a devotional work whose name has escaped me".

Bertie once won a prize at private school for the best collection of wildflowers made during the summer holidays. When Bertie was fourteen, he won the Choir Boys' Handicap bicycle race at a local school treat, having received half a lap start.

After Malvern House, Bertie was further educated at the non-fictional Eton and at Magdalen College, Oxford. At Oxford he was a Rackets Blue.

Bertie is a member of the Drones Club, and most of his friends and fellow Drones members depicted in the stories attended one or both of these institutions with him. It was at Oxford that he first began celebrating the night of the annual Boat Race between Oxford and Cambridge. Though ordinarily he drinks in moderation, Bertie says he is "rather apt to let myself go a bit" on Boat Race night, typically drinking more than usual and making mischief with his old school friends. Specifically, Bertie and others tend to celebrate the occasion by stealing a policeman's helmet, though they often get arrested as a result. London magistrates are aware of this tradition and tend to be lenient towards Bertie when he appears in court the morning after the Boat Race, generally only imposing a fine of five pounds; while this would have constituted a significant amount of money for many people at the time, Bertie has no trouble paying it.

=== The stories ===
The Jeeves canon is set in a floating timeline (with each story being set at the time when it was written though the characters do not age), in an idealized world where wars are downplayed or not mentioned. Certain Edwardian era elements, such as traditional gentlemen's clubs like the Drones Club, continue to be prevalent throughout the stories.

With a few exceptions, the short stories were written first, followed by the novels. The saga begins chronologically in the short story "Jeeves Takes Charge", in which Bertie Wooster first hires Jeeves. Bertie and Jeeves usually live at Berkeley Mansions, though they also go to New York and numerous English country houses. Throughout the short stories and novels, Bertie tries to help his friends and relatives, but ends up becoming entangled in trouble himself, and is ultimately rescued by Jeeves. Typically, Bertie has a new piece of clothing or item that Jeeves disapproves of, though Bertie agrees to relinquish it at the end of the story.

Almost always narrating the story, Bertie becomes involved in many complex and absurd situations. He appears in the one short story he does not narrate, "Bertie Changes His Mind", and does not make an appearance in Ring for Jeeves, though he is mentioned. An important story for Bertie is "Clustering Round Young Bingo", in which Bertie writes an article titled "What the Well-Dressed Man is Wearing" for his Aunt Dahlia's weekly magazine, Milady's Boudoir. For his article, Aunt Dahlia paid Bertie a packet of cigarettes. As with his prize for scripture knowledge, Bertie is proud of this article and mentions it many times. Two other events that are particularly significant for Bertie are his short-lived interest in living with his nieces in "Bertie Changes His Mind" and his temporary separation from Jeeves when Bertie refused to stop playing his banjolele in Thank You, Jeeves.

On several occasions, Bertie assumes an alias. After being arrested on Boat Race night, he calls himself Eustace H. Plimsoll when appearing in court (in Thank You, Jeeves and Right Ho, Jeeves). He is also brought to court after tripping a policeman in Jeeves and the Feudal Spirit, and calls himself Ephraim Gadsby. In one scene in Stiff Upper Lip, Jeeves, he is said to be a thief named Alpine Joe, which is mentioned again in Aunts Aren't Gentlemen. He also impersonates three other people in different stories, namely Rosie M. Banks in "Jeeves in the Springtime" and "Bingo and the Little Woman", Oliver "Sippy" Sipperley in "Without the Option", and Gussie Fink-Nottle in The Mating Season.

In Ring for Jeeves, set in post-WWII England, Bertie attends a school that teaches the aristocracy basic skills, including boot-cleaning, sock-darning, bed-making and primary-grade cooking. This school does not allow its students to employ valets, so Jeeves cannot follow Bertie there and instead works as a butler for Lord Rowcester. However, Bertie is eventually expelled for cheating after he pays a woman to do his sock darning, and Jeeves returns to his side.

== Personal characteristics ==
=== Age and appearance ===
Bertie is approximately 24 years old when he first meets Jeeves in "Jeeves Takes Charge", first published in 1916. His age is not stated in any other story. In the reference work Wodehouse in Woostershire by Wodehouse scholars Geoffrey Jaggard and Tony Ring, it is speculated that Bertie's age ranges from approximately 24 to 29 over the course of the stories. Nigel Cawthorne, author of A Brief Guide to Jeeves and Wooster, also suggested that Bertie is approximately 29 at the end of the saga.

Tall and slim, Bertie is elegantly dressed, largely because of Jeeves, who tends to talk Bertie out of the more flamboyant articles of clothing that Bertie sometimes favours. He has blue eyes. Normally clean-shaven, he grows a moustache in two different stories, and ultimately loses the moustache, as Jeeves does not think a moustache suits Bertie. It seems that he has an innocent-looking appearance; when Bertie wants to wear an alpine hat in Stiff Upper Lip, Jeeves, he states, "I was prepared to concede that it would have been more suitable for rural wear, but against this had to be set the fact that it unquestionably lent a diablerie to my appearance, and mine is an appearance that needs all the diablerie it can get." Bertie has an expressive face that Jeeves can read easily.

In illustrations, Bertie Wooster has frequently been depicted wearing a monocle. However, this is probably merely a stereotypical depiction of an upper-class gentleman, as Bertie does not seem to wear a monocle in the original stories. The only evidence of Bertie wearing a monocle occurs in "The Spot of Art", when Bertie sees a portrait of himself, wearing a monocle, in a poster advertising soup. Bertie is revolted by the image, which gives him a look of "bestial greed". The monocle seems to exaggerate this expression, and Bertie makes fun of how large the monocle looks, calling it "about six inches in circumference". Bertie is never described as wearing a monocle elsewhere. It is unlikely that Bertie would wear a monocle that would not be mentioned, since the glasses of other characters, particularly Bertie's friend Gussie Fink-Nottle, are well-described, and another prominent Wodehouse character, Psmith, has a distinctive monocle that is mentioned many times.

=== Personality ===
Bertie is pleasant and amiable, according to Jeeves. A well-intentioned and honorable young gentleman, he has a strong moral code and prides himself on helping his friends. Unlike his Aunt Agatha, he is not snobbish to servants and is not bothered when one of his pals wants to marry someone from a different social class. He gladly spends time with a variety of people, including rich aristocrats and poor artists.

Tending to be unworldly and naive, Bertie is tricked by con artists in "Aunt Agatha Takes the Count" and "Jeeves and the Greasy Bird", though Jeeves could have warned him earlier on during the former occasion and he was driven by desperation in the latter circumstances; in Aunts Aren't Gentlemen, he realises he is being tricked by a man named Graham, but is unable to avoid paying Graham anyway. He is not interested in global affairs or politics, and advises Jeeves to miss as many political debates as possible in order to live a happy and prosperous life. Usually modest about his intelligence, Bertie states, "I know perfectly well that I've got, roughly speaking, half the amount of brain a normal bloke ought to possess", though he occasionally wants to prove his intelligence, for example in "Scoring off Jeeves". He comes up with well-intentioned if ill-advised or unfortunately botched schemes, such as when he decides to kiss Pauline Stoker to spur his friend Chuffy to propose to her in Thank You, Jeeves. Jeeves, in "The Inimitable Jeeves", calls Bertie 'mentally negligible' behind his back, which is harsh but has some truth in it.

Sometimes, Bertie acts diffidently, giving in to the whims of his formidable aunts or fiancées, but there are also times when Bertie displays a strong will, for example when he attempts to defy Jeeves's wishes on clothing, and when he resolves to confront Aunt Agatha at the end of The Mating Season. Nonetheless, Bertie lacks what Jeeves calls "Presence" and has difficulty presenting himself with authority in front of an audience. On two occasions, Bertie mentions reluctantly playing a part in an amateur theatrical production at a country house, once when roped into playing a butler, and another time when compelled to play King Edward III at his Aunt Agatha's house; for Bertie, both times were a trying ordeal.

Bertie likes cats and dogs, and they like him.

By no means an ambitious man, Bertie seeks neither a prestigious job nor a socially advantageous marriage; it is implied throughout the series that his inheritance means he need not pursue either course. In his own words, Bertie is the sort of person who is "content just to exist beautifully". He likes living a leisurely, quiet life and appreciates small things in his day, such as the oolong tea (which he sometimes calls Bohea) that Jeeves brings to him every morning.

Bertie is often underappreciated and abused by his friends and relatives, despite the fact that they always come crawling to him for help. However, Bertie does not seem to hold grudges towards any of his friends, except Tuppy Glossop, who pushed Bertie into the Drones Club Swimming Pool.

=== Hobbies ===
Bertie participates in a number of physical activities. He likes swimming under ordinary circumstances; he is less fond of it when he falls into water unexpectedly while dressed in regular attire, which occurs multiple times in the stories. He plays tennis with Bingo Little in "Jeeves and the Impending Doom". Bertie also plays golf in the same story. His golf handicap is 16, and he plays in the Drones Club golf tournament every year. At Oxford, he obtained a blue for rackets playing with his friend Harold "Beefy" Anstruther, and briefly went in for rowing under the coaching of Stilton Cheesewright. Later, he rows a boat that Jeeves is steering in "Jeeves and the Impending Doom". Bertie plays squash and was runner-up one year in the Drones Club Annual Squash Handicap. There is no doubt in his mind that he will win the Drones Club darts competition in Jeeves and the Feudal Spirit. Claiming that he can "out-Fred the nimblest Astaire" Bertie enjoys dancing and likes fancy dress balls.

Capable of reading sheet music, Bertie has a light baritone voice and sings often, most prominently in "Jeeves and the Song of Songs". He keeps a piano in his flat, and once played "Happy Days Are Here Again" with one finger on the piano at Totleigh Towers when there was no other method of self-expression available. In Thank You, Jeeves, he attempts to play the banjolele, apparently with little success despite his enthusiasm. In an early story, Bertie claims that "bar a weekly wrestle with the 'Pink 'Un' and an occasional dip into the form book I'm not much of a lad for reading", yet Bertie is frequently in the middle of reading a mystery or crime novel in later stories. He states that he is never happier than when curled up with the latest Agatha Christie, and regularly references literary characters in mystery and crime fiction, including Christie's Hercule Poirot and others such as Sherlock Holmes, A. J. Raffles, and Nero Wolfe.

== Relationships ==
=== Jeeves ===
When Bertie Wooster catches his valet Meadowes stealing his silk socks among other things, he sacks him and sends for another from the agency. Jeeves arrives and mixes Bertie a hangover cure. The cure is remarkably effective, and Bertie engages Jeeves immediately. Thereafter, Bertie happily cedes much of the control of his life to the competent Jeeves, despite the occasional clashes that sometimes occur "when two men of iron will live in close association", according to Bertie. These clashes generally occur because Bertie insists on wearing a new jacket, tie, or some other item that Jeeves disapproves of, though Bertie invariably agrees to give up the item after Jeeves saves him from trouble.

=== Family ===
Due to the volume of stories and time span over which Wodehouse wrote them, there are a number of inconsistencies and contradictions in the information given about his relatives. Bertie and several of his relations appear in the early semi-canonical short story "Extricating Young Gussie". In that story the family name is Mannering-Phipps, not Wooster, and the story has been excluded from most collections of Jeeves and Wooster material, even though the incidents in that story are referenced in later stories.

The family members who make an appearance in the most Jeeves stories are Bertie's Aunt Dahlia (7 short stories, 7 novels) and Aunt Agatha (8 short stories). Aunt Dahlia is friendly and good-natured while Aunt Agatha is cold and haughty, though both make demands of Bertie. Bertie feels obliged to follow their whims, often getting in trouble doing so. Aunt Dahlia's husband Tom Travers and children Angela and Bonzo Travers play important roles. Spenser Gregson, Aunt Agatha's first husband, does not play a major role, but their son Thomas "Thos" Gregson and later her second husband Percy Craye, Earl of Worplesdon appear in the stories.

Aside from Aunts Dahlia and Agatha, Bertie Wooster's father had other siblings. In "Extricating Young Gussie", Bertie's Uncle Cuthbert is described as the "late head of the family", but it is said his son Gussie has no title; Cuthbert's widow is Bertie's Aunt Julia. Another uncle is Uncle Willoughby, upon whom Bertie is initially financially dependent. One of Bertie's uncles, the late Henry Wooster, was the husband of Bertie's Aunt Emily; Claude and Eustace are their twin sons and Bertie's cousins. In "The Rummy Affair of Old Biffy", Bertie takes a present for another of Aunt Emily's sons, Harold, who has just turned six, but, embarrassed at the relatively inexpensive gift he had bought, Bertie wrenches his Uncle James's card off a toy aeroplane, replacing it with his own. Bertie's Uncle George is Lord Yaxley, so if he inherited that title he is likely to be Bertie's eldest living uncle, and Bertie's paternal grandfather may have held the title as well. However, the relative ages of Bertie's father and remaining uncles are not delineated, so it is unclear whether Bertie or one of his male cousins is in line to inherit the peerage. It is theoretically possible that the title was a life peerage under the Appellate Jurisdiction Act 1876, but unlikely as Uncle George is described as having devoted his life to food and drink.

In the story "Bertie Changes His Mind", Bertie mentions a sister who has three daughters, referred to by Jeeves as Mrs Scholfield, though his sister and nieces are not mentioned again.

==== List of relatives ====
Bertie Wooster has many relatives who appear or are mentioned in the stories. Three other possible relatives (Cuthbert and Julia Mannering-Phipps and their son Gussie) appear or are mentioned in "Extricating Young Gussie", though in this story Bertie's surname appears to be Mannering-Phipps. It is not shown in later stories if the three relatives are renamed Wooster. In his book Who's Who in Wodehouse, Daniel Garrison suggests that the protagonist of "Extricating Young Gussie", Bertie Mannering-Phipps, is a prototype of the later Bertie Wooster. Richard Usborne writes that Bertie Wooster does appear in "Extricating Young Gussie" though his last name is Mannering-Phipps in the story. In the book Wodehouse in Woostershire, it is suggested that Bertie's grandmother was married twice, first to a Mannering-Phipps and then to a Wooster with the title Lord Yaxley. Due to the uncertainty surrounding the Mannering-Phipps family, they are listed with asterisks below.

Some marriages occur during the course of the stories. Bertie's uncle Lord Yaxley marries Maud Wilberforce as a result of the events of "Indian Summer of an Uncle", and Bertie's aunt Agatha Gregson marries Lord Worplesdon sometime before the events of Joy in the Morning.

Bertie Wooster's relatives include:

- Unnamed parents (deceased)
- Mrs Scholfield (sister; no first name given)
  - Three unnamed nieces
- Dahlia Travers (aunt)
  - Tom Travers (uncle by marriage)
  - In the short story "Clustering Round Young Bingo" (1925) Tom Travers is presented as Bertie's uncle and Dahlia Travers as marrying into the family.
  - Angela Travers (cousin)
  - Bonzo Travers (cousin)
  - George Travers (uncle)
- Agatha Gregson (aunt)
  - Spenser Gregson (uncle by marriage; deceased)
  - Thomas Gregson (cousin)
  - Lord Worplesdon (uncle by marriage)
  - Florence Craye (step-cousin)
  - Edwin Craye (step-cousin)
- George Wooster, Lord Yaxley (uncle)
  - Maud Wilberforce Wooster, Lady Yaxley (aunt by marriage)
- Henry Wooster (uncle; deceased)
  - Emily Wooster (aunt by marriage)
  - Claude and Eustace Wooster (twin cousins)
  - Harold Wooster (cousin)
- Uncle Willoughby (unknown surname)
- Uncle James (unknown surname)
- Cuthbert Mannering-Phipps (uncle; deceased)*
  - Julia Mannering-Phipps (aunt by marriage)*

=== Fiancées ===
Bertie never marries, but frequently finds himself engaged. In an early story, he attempts to become engaged to Gwladys Pendlebury, an artist who paints his portrait. In the early years, he is rather given to impulsive and short-lived infatuations, under the influence of which he proposes to Florence Craye (in "Jeeves Takes Charge", the fourth story in terms of publication and the first in the internal timeline of the books), to Pauline Stoker, and to Bobbie Wickham. In all of these cases, he rethinks the charms of the holy state and a "lovely profile" upon closer understanding of the personalities of the women in question. Having already received a proposal from him, each woman assumes that she has an open invitation to marry Bertie whenever she has a spat with her current fiancé. Madeline Bassett and Honoria Glossop suffer from a similar delusion, though in each of their cases Bertie was attempting to plead the case of a friend (Gussie Fink-Nottle and Bingo Little respectively) but was misinterpreted as confessing his own love. In all of these cases, Bertie, who aims to be an honorable preux chevalier (valiant knight), feels he has to agree to the marriage, and relies on Jeeves to somehow end the engagement. In the later stories and novels, Bertie regards engagement solely as a dire situation from which Jeeves must extricate him. In the last novel, Bertie acknowledges that his infatuations have all been short-lived.

In Thank You, Jeeves, Bertie states that he is glad he did not marry Pauline Stoker because she is "one of those girls who want you to come and swim a mile before breakfast and rout you out when you are trying to snatch a wink of sleep after lunch for a merry five sets of tennis", and adds that his ideal wife should be, in contrast to the dynamic Pauline, "something rather more on the lines of Janet Gaynor". However, later in the same novel, Jeeves tells Pauline that he doubts a union between her and Bertie would have been successful as Bertie is "essentially one of Nature's bachelors".

Though Jeeves frequently rescues Bertie from unwanted engagements, only rarely do they openly discuss the matter, as they both feel it would be unseemly to "bandy a woman's name" in such a way.

Of the women Bertie Wooster becomes engaged to, those who appear in the most Jeeves stories are Madeline Bassett (5 novels), Lady Florence Craye (1 short story, 3 novels), Bobbie Wickham (3 short stories, 1 novel), and Honoria Glossop (4 short stories).

=== Friends ===
Bertie is loyal to his friends, willing to do whatever he can to solve their problems, saying "when there is a chance of helping a pal we Woosters have no thought of self". This has led to problems for him, since he is regularly drawn into troublesome tasks. Though he continues to provide help, Bertie is aware that people do not hesitate to give him unpleasant jobs; as he says, "Whenever something sticky was afoot and action had to be taken the cry was sure to go up, 'Let Wooster do it.'" Bertie's friends are eager to ask for advice from Jeeves, who enjoys helping Bertie's pals. Jeeves essentially runs a "big Mayfair consulting practice" from their home, and Bertie is accustomed to his acquaintances consulting Jeeves directly without talking to him first. Sometimes Bertie tries to assert that he can also solve problems, but truly he thinks of Jeeves as a genius as much as everyone else does.

Among Bertie's friends, those who appear in the most Jeeves stories are Bingo Little (10 short stories), Gussie Fink-Nottle (4 novels), and Tuppy Glossop (3 short stories, 1 novel). Others include Rev. Harold P. "Stinker" Pinker, Claude "Catsmeat" Potter-Pirbright, Oliver "Sippy" Sipperley, and Rockmetteller "Rocky" Todd. Sometimes a friend or acquaintance will become a jealous antagonist, for example G. D'Arcy "Stilton" Cheesewright.

Bertie's circle in the Drones Cub appears to consist of Freddie Widgeon, Cyril "Barmy" Fotheringay-Phipps, Pongo Twistleton and Claude Cattermole "Catsmeat" Potter-Pirbright, who are consistently mentioned consistently in the Jeeves Canon in reference to the Drones. Many Drones Club members appear in the separate Wodehouse Drones Club stories. Bertie is acquainted with Lord Emsworth, another of Wodehouse's best-known characters, who appears in the Blandings Castle stories. Bertie also knows Lord Emsworth's son Freddie Threepwood.

=== Adversaries ===
Bertie encounters a number of adversaries who are suspicious of him or threaten him in some way. These individuals are often quick to misinterpret Bertie's actions, which may seem strange due to the bizarre situations he becomes involved in, and come to the conclusion that Bertie is somehow mentally unsound or that he is a thief.

Among Bertie's various adversaries, those who appear in the most Jeeves stories are the "nerve specialist" or "loony doctor" Sir Roderick Glossop (4 short stories, 2 novels), and the intimidating "amateur dictator" Roderick Spode (4 novels), though Sir Roderick Glossop later becomes Bertie's friend. Other antagonists include Sir Watkyn Bassett and Major Plank.

== Language ==
With two exceptions, the stories are told in the first person by Bertie Wooster. Although Jeeves occasionally describes Bertie as "mentally negligible", Bertie's narrative style reflects notable facility with the English language. He displays what would be considered by today's standards a broad, if not very deep, knowledge of English literature, making allusions from sources including the Bible, Shakespeare, and romantic literature of the 19th century (all of these references typical of the schooling he and his 20th-century audience received), even if he relies on Jeeves to complete quotations for him. Bertie frequently applies these serious references in an over-simplified, farcical manner to the situation he is in, or uses the reference in a way totally contrary to its original context and meaning. In one story, Bertie complains about the constant attentions of a woman in whom he has no interest by referring to her as "young Sticketh-Closer-Than-a-Brother" in an annoyed fashion. The verse (Proverbs 18:24) that Bertie partially quotes actually praises the value of close friendship when it refers to a "friend that sticketh closer than a brother".

Bertie is fond of pre-World War I slang, peppering his speech with words and phrases such as "what ho!", "pipped", "bally" and so on, and he informally abbreviates words and phrases, such as "eggs and b" (eggs and bacon). He uses exaggerated imagery, and throughout the stories, he almost never says the word "walk", instead using terms and phrases like "toddle", "stagger", "ankle", "leg it", "make tracks", "whoosh" and "whizz". His informal language is juxtaposed with advanced vocabulary; Bertie claims that over the years, he has picked up a vocabulary of sorts from Jeeves. As the years pass, he makes references to popular film and literature that would have been well-known to readers when the books were written.

One literary device Bertie employs is the transferred epithet, using an adjective to modify a noun instead of using the corresponding adverb to modify the verb of the sentence. Examples of this include "I balanced a thoughtful lump of sugar on the teaspoon" and "He waved a concerned cigar". He also favours the mixed metaphor, an absurd combination of two incompatible metaphors. For example, after one of Bertie's plans goes awry, he decides not to dwell on his mistake, saying "spilt milk blows nobody any good"; this combines the proverbs "It's no use crying over spilt milk" and "It's an ill wind that blows no good". Bertie also uses running gags, making humorous statements and recalling them later within the same story and in other stories.

== Adaptations ==
Television
Ian Carmichael played the part of Bertie Wooster (opposite Dennis Price as Jeeves) in the BBC television series, The World of Wooster (1965–1967).
Jonathan Cecil (who, like Bertie himself, was an Old Etonian) played him in the BBC tribute film Thank You, P. G. Wodehouse (1981), with Michael Aldridge as Jeeves.
Hugh Laurie (also an Old Etonian) portrayed Bertie Wooster in the early-1990s ITV series Jeeves and Wooster opposite his long-time comedy partner, Stephen Fry, as Jeeves and has been widely acclaimed as "the definitive portrayal of Jeeves & Wooster". While Bertie's character is largely faithful to his character in the canon, Bertie is also depicted as being a capable pianist and singer, making use of actor-musician Hugh Laurie's musical talents. He plays and sings show tunes and popular songs of the 1920s and 1930s, including the songs "Nagasaki", "Forty-Seven Ginger-Headed Sailors", "Puttin' on the Ritz", "Minnie the Moocher" and "You Do Something to Me". In the original stories, Bertie sings often and is said to have a pleasant "light baritone voice", and can read sheet music, though it is unclear to what extent he plays piano. In the episode "The Delayed Arrival", Bertie crossdresses and assumes an alias when he briefly pretends to be a maid named "Beryl" employed in the Travers household, Brinkley Court. This did not occur in the original novel on which the episode was based, Jeeves and the Feudal Spirit.
Film
David Niven was the first, and to date the only actor to play Bertie Wooster in a mainstream theatrical film, in Thank You, Jeeves! (1936). This film bore almost no resemblance to Wodehouse's fiction. Bertie was portrayed as woman-chaser, the opposite of the more common situation in the stories, in which Bertie strives to avoid marriage entanglements. Jeeves (Arthur Treacher) seemed more of a pompous prig than a brilliant helper. Notably, when Bertie grows a moustache that Jeeves disapproves of in Jeeves and the Feudal Spirit, Bertie cites Niven's moustache as a justification. A follow-up film, Step Lively, Jeeves (1937), did not feature Bertie Wooster as a character.
Radio
"Leave It to Jeeves" (1940) was a radio drama broadcast on CBS's Forecast series. Edward Everett Horton portrayed Bertie Wooster and Alan Mowbray portrayed Jeeves.
Naunton Wayne portrayed Bertie Wooster in a 1955 radio drama based on Right Ho, Jeeves broadcast on the BBC Light Programme, with Deryck Guyler as Jeeves.
Terry-Thomas played Bertie Wooster opposite Roger Livesey as Jeeves in a dramatisation of "Indian Summer of an Uncle" and "Jeeves Takes Charge" released as a record album in 1958.
Richard Briers portrayed Bertie Wooster in the BBC Radio 4 series What Ho, Jeeves! opposite Michael Hordern as Jeeves. The series ran occasionally from 1973 to 1981.
Simon Cadell played Bertie Wooster opposite David Suchet as Jeeves in the BBC Saturday Night Theatre radio adaptation of Right Ho, Jeeves in 1988.
Mark Richard portrayed Bertie Wooster with Martin Jarvis as Jeeves in a 1997 L.A. Theatre Works dramatisation of The Code of the Woosters. Simon Templeman played Bertie Wooster with Paxton Whitehead as Jeeves in the same organisation's 1998 recording of an adaptation of Thank You, Jeeves.
Marcus Brigstocke played Bertie Wooster in a BBC Radio 4 adaptation of The Code of the Woosters in 2006, with Andrew Sachs as Jeeves.
James Callis voiced Bertie Wooster in a 2018 BBC adaptation of Stiff Upper Lip, Jeeves, with Martin Jarvis as Jeeves.
Audiobooks
Audiobooks of many of the Jeeves stories and novels in which Bertie Wooster is the narrator have been recorded by British actors, including Simon Callow, Jonathan Cecil, Ian Carmichael, Martin Jarvis, Frederick Davidson, and Dinsdale Landen.
In 2020, Audible released the first volume of their P.G Wodehouse collection. This volume contains the books The Inimitable Jeeves, Carry On Jeeves, Right Ho, Jeeves, The Code of the Woosters and Joy in the Morning. They are narrated by Stephen Fry.
Stage
The 1975 musical Jeeves opened with David Hemmings as Bertie Wooster, and Michael Aldridge as Jeeves.
By Jeeves, the 1996 rewrite of the previous musical, opened with Steven Pacey as Bertie Wooster, and Malcolm Sinclair as Jeeves. In the 2001 recording, John Scherer portrayed Bertie Wooster, with Martin Jarvis as Jeeves.
The play Jeeves and Wooster in Perfect Nonsense opened in 2013 with Stephen Mangan as Bertie Wooster and Matthew Macfadyen as Jeeves.
Literature
In the fictional biography Jeeves: A Gentleman's Personal Gentleman by C. Northcote Parkinson, Bertie Wooster becomes the 9th Earl of Yaxley on the death of his uncle George, marries Bobbie Wickham and makes Jeeves the landlord of the Angler's Rest pub, which is on the Yaxley estate. Jeeves then supplants Mr Mulliner as the resident expert and storyteller of the pub.
In Alan Moore's graphic novel The League of Extraordinary Gentlemen: Black Dossier, Bertie Wooster appears in the segment What Ho, Gods of the Abyss? which comically mixes elements of Wodehouse with H.P. Lovecraft's Cthulhu Mythos. Bertie blithely recounts the arrival of a Mi-go to Brinkley Court and Aunt Dahlia's possession by Cthulhu. The Lovecraftian menaces are driven off by Jeeves with the assistance of Mina Murray, Allan Quatermain, Carnacki and Orlando but not before Gussie Fink-Nottle's brain is surgically removed (a condition that, in the end, causes no real difference in his behaviour). Throughout the events, Bertie remains unaware of the true nature of the goings-on.
Jeeves and the Wedding Bells, a Jeeves novel by Sebastian Faulks narrated by Bertie Wooster, was published in 2013. It was authorized by the Wodehouse estate. The audiobook was narrated by Julian Rhind-Tutt.
The novel Jeeves and the King of Clubs was written by Ben Schott and published in 2018 with the authorization of the Wodehouse estate. The audiobook was narrated by James Lance. Schott wrote a sequel titled Jeeves and the Leap of Faith, which was published in 2020. The audiobook for Jeeves and the Leap of Faith was narrated by Daniel Ings.

== See also ==
- List of Jeeves characters, an alphabetical list of Jeeves characters
- List of P. G. Wodehouse characters § Jeeves and Wooster, a categorized outline of Jeeves characters
