= Please, Jeeves =

Japanese manga series

- Dust jacket of the first volume of Please, Jeeves

プリーズ、ジーヴス (Purīzu, Jīvusu)
- Manga
- Written by: Tamaki Morimura; P. G. Wodehouse
- Illustrated by: Bun Katsuta
- Published by: Hakusensha
- Magazine: Melody
- Original run: 2008 – 2014
- Volumes: 5

Please, Jeeves (Japanese: プリーズ、ジーヴス, Hepburn: Purīzu, Jīvusu) is a Japanese manga series adapted from the comedic Jeeves short stories written by English humourist P. G. Wodehouse. The original stories were translated into Japanese by Tamaki Morimura and illustrated by Bun Katsuta. Please, Jeeves was serialized in Hakusensha's shōjo (girls') manga magazine Melody from 2008 to 2014 and published in five volumes.

The series stars the amiable and naive young gentleman Bertie Wooster and his brilliant valet Jeeves. Each chapter of the manga adapts one or two short stories, giving the series an episodic structure, with each chapter being a complete story.

== Development ==
In the years leading up to the creation of Please, Jeeves, butlers became a popular topic for manga, with one example being the comic character Hayate the Combat Butler. Sometime in 2007, Maki Shiraoka, a senior editor for Hakusensha, conceived of the idea of a manga series featuring Jeeves and Bertie Wooster. She discussed this idea with another Hakusensha editor, Ayaka Tokushige, who found Tamaki Morimura's translation of The Inimitable Jeeves and believed it would be a good basis for a manga. They planned to serialize the stories in the bimonthly shōjo (girls') manga magazine Melody and then release the stories as a single volume at the end of the year. After searching for an artist, they chose Bun Katsuta, who is known for her "retro" style.

Early in 2008, while working on adapting Wodehouse's stories into manga form, Bun Katsuta and Tamaki Morimura realised that they needed to know more details about 1920s–30s London, such as what a ten-pound note looked like. They visited London and the nearby countryside together for research and studied English stately homes, shops, and architecture, guided by Wodehouse experts. Editors Maki Shiraoka and Ayaka Tokushige were also part of the tour. The first Please, Jeeves story was published in the April 2008 issue of Melody and was an immediate hit.

== Publication ==
The short stories adapted for Please, Jeeves were originally published between 1919 and 1930. Authorized by the P. G. Wodehouse estate, Please, Jeeves was serialized in the bimonthly manga magazine Melody, published by Hakusensha, between 2008 and 2014. It was also released in five volumes by the same publisher, under the company's Hana to Yume Comics label. The first three volumes, which are numbered as a set with white dust jackets, were published in March 2009, December 2010, and October 2012, respectively. The fourth and fifth volumes are not explicitly numbered, and have a red dust jacket and blue dust jacket respectively, though both are still stated to be part of the "Please, Jeeves Series". They were published in November 2013 and December 2014.

In the manga, Jeeves is called a butler, because the Japanese are not familiar with the word valet.

== Volumes ==
Each volume contains between four and six stories. All five published volumes include the original magazine publication date for each story. The last volume also includes a text translation of the short story "Jeeves Makes an Omelette" with five illustrations.

Volume	No.	Melody issue date	Original short story	Original collection
1	1	April 2008	"Scoring off Jeeves" and "Sir Roderick Comes to Lunch"	The Inimitable Jeeves
1	2	June 2008	"The Purity of the Turf" and "The Metropolitan Touch"	The Inimitable Jeeves
1	3	October 2008	"Jeeves in the Springtime"	The Inimitable Jeeves
1	4	December 2008	"Comrade Bingo"	The Inimitable Jeeves
1	5	February 2009	"Bingo and the Little Woman"	The Inimitable Jeeves
2	6	August 2009	"Jeeves Takes Charge"	Carry On, Jeeves
2	7	October 2009	"The Rummy Affair of Old Biffy"	Carry On, Jeeves
2	8	April 2010	"Without the Option"	Carry On, Jeeves
2	9	June 2010	"Clustering Round Young Bingo"	Carry On, Jeeves
2	10	August 2010	"Bertie Changes His Mind"	Carry On, Jeeves
3	11	December 2010	"Aunt Agatha Takes the Count"	The Inimitable Jeeves
3	12	February 2011	"The Delayed Exit of Claude and Eustace"	The Inimitable Jeeves
3	13	December 2011	"Jeeves and the Yule-tide Spirit"	Very Good, Jeeves
3	14	February 2012	"Jeeves and the Impending Doom"	Very Good, Jeeves
3	15	April 2012	"The Inferiority Complex of Old Sippy"	Very Good, Jeeves
3	16	June 2012	"The Love That Purifies"	Very Good, Jeeves
4	17	October 2012	"Jeeves and the Chump Cyril"	The Inimitable Jeeves
4	18	December 2012	"Episode of the Dog McIntosh"	Very Good, Jeeves
4	19	February 2013	"The Spot of Art"	Very Good, Jeeves
4	20	October 2013	"The Ordeal of Young Tuppy"	Very Good, Jeeves
5	21	June 2013	"Jeeves and the Old School Chum"	Very Good, Jeeves
5	22	August 2013	"Jeeves and the Kid Clementina"	Very Good, Jeeves
5	23	June 2014	"Jeeves and the Unbidden Guest"	Carry On, Jeeves
5	24	October 2014	"The Aunt and the Sluggard"	Carry On, Jeeves

== See also ==
- List of the Jeeves short stories
