= Percy Jeeves =

English cricketer (1888–1916)

- Percy Jeeves with Warwickshire insignia

Personal information
- Born: 5 March 1888; Earlsheaton, Yorkshire, England
- Died: 22 July 1916 (aged 28); High Wood, Somme, France
- Height: 5 ft 8 in (1.73 m)
- Batting: Right-handed
- Bowling: Right-arm medium-fast

Domestic team information
- Years: Team
- 1912–1914: Warwickshire
- First-class debut: 30 May 1912 Warwickshire v Australia
- Last First-class: 27 August 1914 Warwickshire v Surrey

Career statistics
Competition	First-class
Matches	50
Runs scored	1204
Batting average	16.05
100s/50s	-/4
Top score	86*
Balls bowled	8952
Wickets	199
Bowling average	20.03
5 wickets in innings	12
10 wickets in match	1
Best bowling	7/34
Catches/stumpings	49/-
- Source: Cricket Archive

Percy Jeeves (5 March 1888 – 22 July 1916) was a first-class cricketer from England, playing 50 first-class matches in his career, all but one for Warwickshire County Cricket Club from 1912 to 1914. He played one match for the Players against the Gentlemen in 1914. Jeeves joined the British Army in the First World War and was killed in action in 1916. P. G. Wodehouse named his character Jeeves after Percy, after watching him play in a county match at Cheltenham in 1913.

== Cricket career ==
Percy Jeeves was born on 5 March 1888 in Earlsheaton, near Dewsbury in Yorkshire, England, United Kingdom. He was the son of Edwin Jeeves, a passenger guard for the Lancashire and Yorkshire Railway, and Edwin's wife Nancy Jeeves, née Garforth. Percy Jeeves had two older brothers, Thomas and Alick, and a younger brother, Harold.

Jeeves's family moved to Goole in 1901, when Jeeves's father was transferred there. Jeeves played cricket at Goole Cricket Club, and became a professional player at Hawes Cricket Club. In 1910, he had a trial with the Yorkshire County Cricket Club.

In late summer 1910, Warwickshire County Cricket Club secretary Rowland Ryder saw Jeeves playing at Hawes and was impressed. Later in 1910, Warwickshire CCC's general committee decided to make Jeeves an offer of engagement for 1911. He accepted and moved to Birmingham in 1911. A player was required to live in a county for two years before being eligible to play for that county in the County Championship, so Jeeves spent 1911 playing minor matches and working around Warwickshire's Edgbaston Cricket Ground. In 1912, he was allocated to Moseley Cricket Club as their professional in the Birmingham League.

While still qualifying for the county championship, he played his first two first-class matches in 1912 for Warwickshire against the Australian and South African touring teams. His first-class debut was on 30 May 1912 against the Australian team. In 1913, mainly a fast-medium bowler, he took 106 wickets in first-class matches, at 20.88, and scored 765 runs at 20.13. In 1914, he took 90 further wickets. In all, he took 199 wickets in his 50 first-class matches at a bowling average of 20.03.

On 9 July 1914, Jeeves played for the Players against the Gentlemen at The Oval, assisting the Players to victory by taking 4-44 in the Gentlemen's second innings; Plum Warner predicted a bright future for him. Jeeves played his last first-class match on 27 August 1914 for Warwickshire against Surrey. Jeeves had played 2 first-class matches in 1912, 24 first-class matches in 1913, and 24 first-class matches in 1914.

In addition to playing cricket, Jeeves also played football and billiards.

== War service and death ==
After the outbreak of the First World War and once the 1914 cricket season had finished, Jeeves volunteered for service in the army. He was among thousands of volunteers who assembled at Birmingham General Hospital to depart for army training on 10 October 1914. He became Private 611 Jeeves of the 2nd Birmingham Battalion, C Company. With the rest of the battalion, he began training on 13 October 1914. Jeeves would spend Christmas with his family in Goole for the last time in 1914.

On the first day of 1915, the 2nd Battalion was renamed the 15th Battalion Royal Warwickshire Regiment. Training continued for the battalion for months and they were moved to different locations for various types of training. In mid-November, the whole battalion went home on a short leave, and then on 21 November 1915, they were deployed to France. C Company first went to the front lines on 22 December 1915.

On 22 July 1916, Private Jeeves (aged 28) was killed in action in France, at High Wood near Montauban-de-Picardie, during the Battle of the Somme. His body was never recovered and his name is carved on the Thiepval Memorial for soldiers with no known grave who died during the Battle of the Somme. His name is also inscribed on the Goole Cenotaph war memorial, among other names of casualties of the First World War.

== Inspiration for Wodehouse ==
P. G. Wodehouse's fictional characters Bertie Wooster and his ingenious valet Jeeves have become famous since their 1915 debut short story ("Extricating Young Gussie"), with the character Jeeves first appearing in a major role in 1916 in his second appearance (in "Leave it to Jeeves"). Wodehouse named the fictional Jeeves after the cricketer Jeeves, according to the 1953 book Bring on the Girls!, a semi-autobiographical book co-written by Wodehouse and Guy Bolton.

In 1967, Rowland Ryder, son of the Warwickshire County Cricket Club secretary (also named Rowland Ryder) who had discovered Percy Jeeves at Hawes, wrote to Wodehouse asking if he named the character after Percy Jeeves of the Warwickshire County Cricket Club. Ryder shortly received a letter from Wodehouse in reply:

Yes, you are quite right. It must have been in 1913 that I paid a visit to my parents in Cheltenham and went to see Warwickshire play Gloucestershire on the Cheltenham College ground. I suppose Jeeves's bowling must have impressed me, for I remembered him in 1916 when I was in New York and starting the Jeeves and Bertie saga, and it was just the name I wanted. I have always thought till lately that he was playing for Gloucestershire that day. (I remember admiring his action very much.)

After receiving Wodehouse's letter, Ryder sent Wodehouse a Warwickshire tie. Wodehouse replied with another letter gladly accepting the tie and wrote that it was "the only one I wear nowadays". Wodehouse wore the tie in photographs for a 1971 interview with Michael Davie in the colour supplement of The Observer. Davie commented the tie had been singed by Wodehouse's pipe; the Warwickshire CCC secretary, Leslie Deakins, sent Wodehouse another tie. According to Ryder, Wodehouse "had virtually become an honorary member of the club". The first letter from Wodehouse to Ryder is displayed in Warwickshire's Edgbaston museum. There is also a letter from Wodehouse to Deakins displayed at Edgbaston.

== Legacy ==
The cricket ball with which Jeeves took seven wickets for 34 runs against Worcestershire in 1913 is displayed in the Edgbaston Cricket Ground pavilion. The match took place at Edgbaston.

In April 2016, the centenary year of Jeeves's death, a blue plaque honouring Jeeves was unveiled in Goole, where Jeeves lived before he played cricket for Warwickshire. In July 2016, a memorial stone made to honour Jeeves was unveiled alongside a poplar tree planted in his honour at the Cheltenham College Ground, where P. G. Wodehouse saw Jeeves play in 1913. The tree was planted jointly by Jeeves’s great-nephew and Wodehouse’s grandson.
