= Rowland Ryder =

Rowland Ryder (1914 – 13 February 1996) was an English schoolmaster, journalist, biographer and cricket writer.

== Life and work ==
Ryder's father, also called Rowland Ryder, was the secretary of Warwickshire County Cricket Club from 1895 to 1944, and young Rowland spent much of his childhood at Edgbaston Cricket Ground, Warwickshire's headquarters. He was educated at King Edward's School, Birmingham and Exeter College, Oxford. During World War II he joined the British Army, serving in the Royal Armoured Corps with the Eighth Army in Egypt, and in the British Liberation Army in Europe.

Ryder wrote three biographies, all with a military theme: on the First World War English nurse Edith Cavell, on the Second World War German general Johann von Ravenstein, and on the Second World War British general (and later President of Marylebone Cricket Club) Oliver Leese.

The second chapter of Ryder's only cricket book, Cricket Calling, a collection of essays published a few months before he died, is titled "The Essence of Cricket", and opens with this sentence: "Cricket is not so much a game as an extension of being English: a gallimaufry of paradoxes, contradictions, frightening logic and sheer impossibilities, of gentle courtesy and rough violence." In another chapter, "The Unplayable Jeeves", Ryder recounts his correspondence with P. G. Wodehouse which established that Wodehouse had named his famous character Jeeves after the Warwickshire bowler Percy Jeeves, whom Wodehouse had seen playing in a county match at Cheltenham in 1913.

== Bibliography ==
=== Books ===
- Edith Cavell 1975
- Ravenstein: Portrait of a German General 1978
- Oliver Leese 1987
- Cricket Calling 1995

=== Articles for Wisden ===
- "The Pleasures of Reading Wisden", 1965 edition, pp. 95–100
- "Warwickshire the Unpredictable", 1968, pp. 124–30
- "And Gilligan Led Them Out", 1970, pp. 124–30
- "The Great Wicket-Keepers: From Tom Sueter to Alan Knott", 1972, pp. 137–45
- "The Warwickshire Way", 1973, pp. 127–34
- "The Glorious Uncertainty", 1974, pp. 117–22
- "Gilbert Jessop – The Most Exciting Cricketer of Them All", 1975, pp. 137–42
- "F.R. Foster – A Prince of the Golden Age", 1976, pp. 134–40
- "E. J. ('Tiger') Smith", 1980, pp. 96–102
