= Bertie Changes His Mind =

Short story by P. G. Wodehouse

- Short story by P. G. Wodehouse
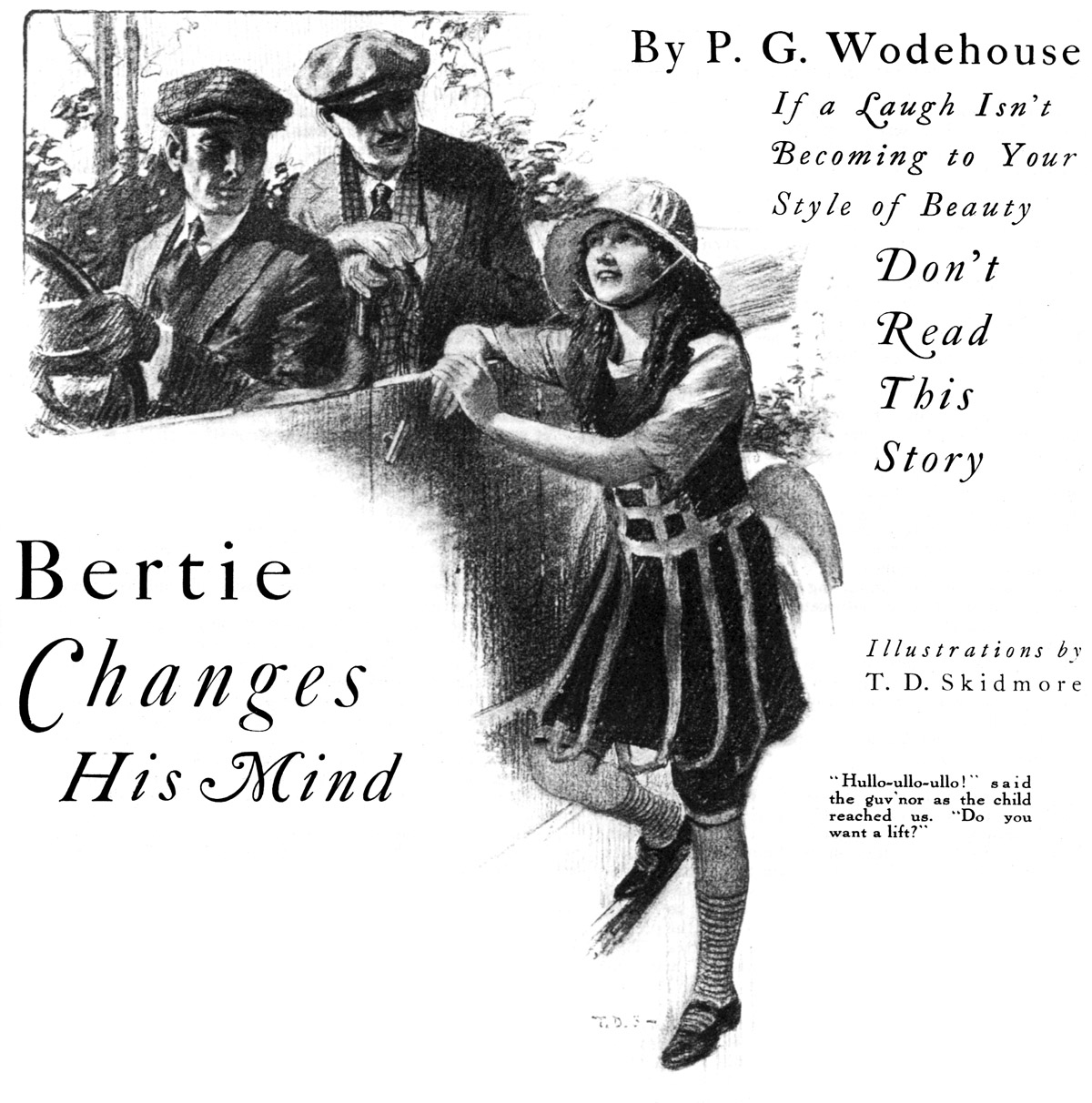
- 1922 Cosmopolitan title illustration by T. D. Skidmore
- Country: United Kingdom
- Language: English
- Genre: Comedy

Publication
- Publisher: The Strand Magazine (UK); Cosmopolitan (US)
- Media type: Print (Magazine)
- Publication date: August 1922

Chronology
- Series: Jeeves
Clustering Round Young Bingo	Jeeves and the Impending Doom

"Bertie Changes His Mind" is a short story by P. G. Wodehouse, and features the young gentleman Bertie Wooster and his valet Jeeves. The story was published in The Strand Magazine in the United Kingdom in August 1922, and in Cosmopolitan in the United States in the same month. The story was also included in the 1925 collection Carry On, Jeeves.

It is the only Jeeves story narrated from the perspective of Jeeves. In the story, Jeeves becomes concerned after Bertie starts considering living with his sister and three nieces. He arranges for Bertie to speak to an audience of young girls.

The story includes references to Bertie’s sister, Mrs. Scholfield; this is the only mention of Bertie having a sibling in the Jeeves canon.

== Plot ==
The course of action outlined by Mr. Wooster meant the finish of our cosy bachelor establishment if it came into being as a practical proposition; and no doubt some men in my place would at this juncture have voiced their disapproval. I avoided this blunder.

— Jeeves takes an indirect approach

Bertie wants a daughter. Jeeves protests that adoption is a long and difficult process. Bertie recalls that his sister Mrs. Scholfield and her three daughters will be back from India next week, and proposes that he buy a house and live with them. Jeeves disapproves, and suggests they go to Brighton. Jeeves enjoys Brighton, but Bertie grows bored after two days. They head back to London.

While driving, Jeeves sees a girl waving, and stops. Bertie offers her a lift. Grateful, she says she will get in trouble with Miss Tomlinson when she gets back to school for leaving. Jeeves suggests that Bertie pretend he is a friend of the girl's father and took her for a drive. At the school, Bertie follows the girl, Peggy Mainwaring (pronounced "Mannering"), inside. Later, Jeeves tells Miss Tomlinson that Mr. Wooster is an eminent figure and would be delighted to give a speech to the girls, and she approves. Afterward, Jeeves considers that something might go wrong with Bertie's car.

Later, Bertie finds Jeeves smoking by the car. Bertie, who has lost his cigarette case, asks to smoke one of Jeeves's. While they smoke, Jeeves tells Bertie that in his youth, he was a page-boy in a school for young ladies, and that the girls often stared and giggled at guests to make them uncomfortable. This makes Bertie nervous. Later, Peggy returns Bertie's cigarette case to Jeeves, claiming that Bertie must have dropped it. She is excited to hear Bertie speak because the girls like to sit and stare at guest speakers. She leaves, and Bertie appears, telling Jeeves to start the car, because he learned Miss Tomlinson expects him to speak to the girls. Jeeves tells him the car is out of order and will take a little time to repair.

Despairingly, Bertie goes to speak to the girls in a large schoolroom. Jeeves watches from behind a pillar outside. Bertie stammers, and only manages to mention a gambling tip and a story about a stockbroker and a chorus girl, which upsets Miss Tomlinson. Jeeves leaves to ready the car. Soon, Bertie comes to ask if the car is ready. Jeeves replies that he has just finished fixing the car. Bertie nervously says that his speech went well, but now is the time to leave. Hearing voices approach, Bertie hides under a rug in the back of the car. Miss Tomlinson approaches the car, telling Jeeves that some girls were found smoking cigarettes given by Mr. Wooster. After she leaves, Bertie tells Jeeves to get a move on.

A week later at the flat, Bertie comments how pleasant the status quo is. Jeeves asks if Bertie has found a suitable house where he can live with his sister and three nieces. With a shudder, Bertie tells Jeeves that he has changed his mind.

== Style ==
This is the first story in which Jeeves uses foreign-language phrases, which regularly appear in his speech in later stories. He uses "sine qua non", "finesse", and "contretemps" in his opening paragraph in "Bertie Changes His Mind". Jeeves starts using less common foreign phrases and quotations in his speech later in Thank You, Jeeves, where Latin phrases and sentences become a motif (for instance, "Tempora mutandur nos et mutamur in illis", ch. 15). Additionally, this is the first story in which Bertie takes the source of a quotation from Jeeves to be an acquaintance of Jeeves, which also happens in later stories. This occurs when Jeeves quotes Ralph Waldo Emerson to Bertie:

"Emerson," I reminded him, "says a friend may well be reckoned the masterpiece of Nature, sir."
"Well, you can tell Emerson from me the next time you see him that he's an ass."

In "Bertie Changes His Mind", Jeeves does not reveal to Bertie how he has manipulated events by the end of the story. Bertie apparently never realizes that Jeeves arranged for him to give a lecture at the girls' school or that Jeeves faked the breakdown of the car. According to Kristin Thompson, this story shows the reader that Jeeves is capable of manipulating events without Bertie's knowledge in the other stories that are narrated by Bertie. Jeeves's offstage activities can sometimes be inferred from clues in Bertie's narrative, such as in "Jeeves and the Kid Clementina", "The Inferiority Complex of Old Sippy", and "Jeeves and the Impending Doom". At one point in Jeeves's narrative in "Bertie Changes His Mind", Jeeves discusses the advantages of eavesdropping, which may hint that he sometimes acquires information by eavesdropping on Bertie's conversations in other stories.

== Background ==
In 1922, Wodehouse wrote to his stepdaughter Leonora, then at an English girls' school, and asked her questions about her school to gather details to incorporate in "Bertie Changes His Mind", and specifically asked about a school song of welcome. Such a song is used for comic effect in the story. In the letter, Wodehouse wrote:

I say, I've got out the plot of a Jeeves story where Bertie visits a girls' school and is very shy and snootered by the girls and the headmistress. Can you give me any useful details? What would be likely to happen to a chap who was seeing over a school? Do you remember—was it Ely?—the girls used to sing a song of welcome. Can you give me the words of that song and when it would be sung? And anything else of that sort that would be likely to rattle Bertie.

== Publication history ==
1922 Strand illustration by A. Wallis Mills

Jeeves's narration is somewhat more informal in the original version of the story. One major difference between the magazine version and the Carry On, Jeeves version is that Jeeves regularly refers to Bertie as "the guv'nor" in the earlier version, though he never uses this term in Carry On, Jeeves, usually referring to him as "Mr. Wooster" instead.

A. Wallis Mills illustrated this story in the Strand. T. D. Skidmore illustrated this story in Cosmopolitan.

This story was included in the American edition of the 1939 collection The Week-End Wodehouse and in the 1958 collection Selected Stories by P. G. Wodehouse.

== Adaptations ==
The story was adapted for an episode of The World of Wooster. The episode, titled "Jeeves and the Change of Mind", was the second episode of the second series. It was originally broadcast in the UK on 11 January 1966.

This story was adapted into the Jeeves and Wooster episode "Wooster with a Wife", the sixth episode of the second series, which aired on 19 May 1991. There are some differences in plot, including:

- In the episode, Bertie's first idea is to have children by marrying Bobbie Wickham, who is not mentioned in the original story.
- Peggy Mainwaring does not appear in the episode. Miss Tomlinson also does not appear in the episode; she is replaced by Miss Mapleton.
- In the episode, Jeeves does not mention any trouble with Bertie's car. He also does not mention working as a page-boy at a school for young ladies.
- In the original story, Jeeves listened to Bertie's speech by hiding behind a pillar on the porch outside the room; there is no suggestion of this in the episode.
- In the episode, there is no mention of girls claiming they obtained cigarettes from Bertie, and Bertie does not hide in the back of the car.
