= Extricating Young Gussie =

- Short story by P. G. Wodehouse
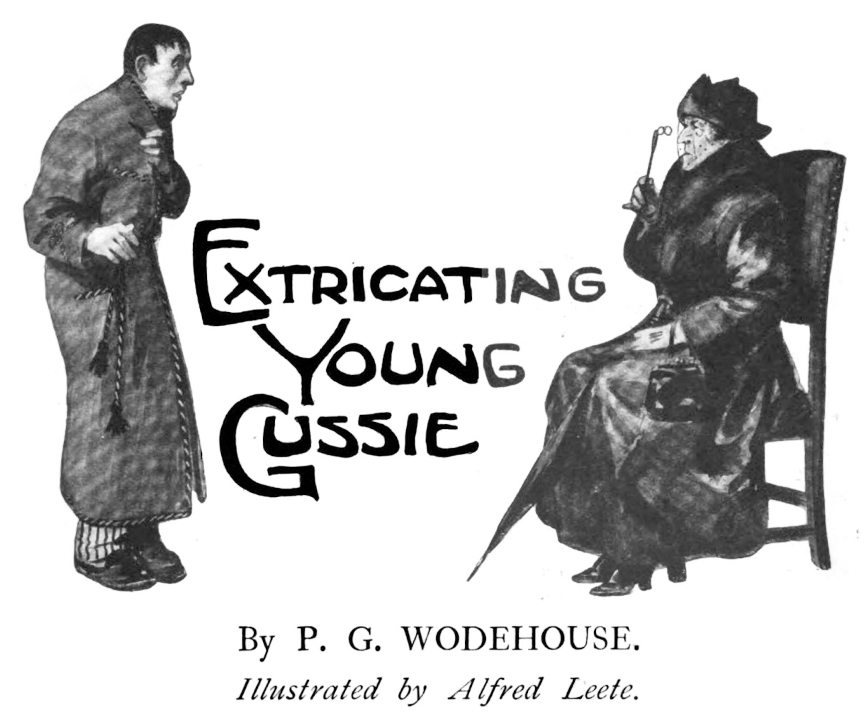
- 1916 Strand title illustration by Alfred Leete
- Country: United Kingdom
- Language: English
- Genre: Comedy

Publication
- Publisher: Saturday Evening Post (US); Strand (UK)
- Media type: Print (Magazine)
- Publication date: 18 September 1915 (US); January 1916 (UK)

Chronology
- Series: Jeeves
—	My Man Jeeves

"Extricating Young Gussie" is a short story by the British comic writer P. G. Wodehouse. It was first published in the United States in the 18 September 1915 issue of The Saturday Evening Post and in the United Kingdom in the January 1916 edition of The Strand Magazine. It was included in the collection The Man with Two Left Feet (1917).

The story features the first appearance of two of Wodehouse's most popular and enduring characters, the impeccable valet Jeeves and his master Bertie Wooster, though there are some differences between this story and later stories in which they appear. Jeeves only plays a very small role in this story and Bertie's surname, which is not explicitly given, appears to be Mannering-Phipps, as that is the name of his cousin Gussie, whose father is Bertie's paternal uncle. Bertie's imperious Aunt Agatha, a recurring character, is also introduced in this story.

While Jeeves is only a minor character in this story, he plays a larger role in the next published story in which he appears, "The Artistic Career of Corky" (originally titled "Leave It to Jeeves"), which was first published in February 1916. The first meeting of Jeeves and Bertie was chronicled in the November 1916 short story "Jeeves Takes Charge".

== Plot ==
In Bertie's flat in London, around half past eleven, Jeeves wakes Bertie up telling him that his Aunt Agatha has come to see him. She is distressed that Augustus "Gussie" Mannering-Phipps, her nephew and Bertie's cousin living in New York City, has fallen for a girl named Ray Denison who is a vaudeville performer. Concerned about the family's prestige, Aunt Agatha does not want Gussie to marry a vaudeville performer like his late father did, though Gussie's mother Julia learned to be aristocratic. Aunt Agatha demands that Bertie go to New York and keep Gussie from marrying Ray.

Arriving in New York, Bertie leaves Jeeves to see Bertie's baggage through customs and soon runs into Gussie, now going by the name of "George Wilson". Gussie is about to appear on the music-hall stage because Ray's father, an old vaudeville professional, does not want Ray to marry someone outside the profession. Bertie, afraid that he will not be able to disentangle Gussie from vaudeville, cables his Aunt Julia, Gussie's mother, for help.

It was rotten. The poor nut had got stage fright so badly that it practically eliminated his voice. He sounded like some far-off echo of the past "yodeling" through a woolen blanket.

— Gussie gets stage fright

After some rehearsals, Gussie appears in his first show. Attending the performance, Bertie sits next to a very pretty girl. Gussie has stage fright and starts badly, but halfway through his second song the girl beside Bertie joins in, bucking up Gussie. The audience cheers them both. After the show, Gussie reveals that the girl is Ray Denison. Bertie is later introduced to her, and meets her formidable father, Joe Danby.

Aunt Julia arrives, and Bertie takes her to see Gussie and Ray in their respective shows, which seem to engross Aunt Julia. Next, they visit Ray's father Danby, who turns out to have performed with Julia twenty-five years prior. Aunt Julia, happy to see Danby, is suddenly friendly rather than aristocratic. Danby confesses that he always loved her, and prohibited his daughter from marrying outside the profession because that is what Julia did. Julia is moved and they share a heartfelt embrace. Bertie edges out. Meeting Gussie soon after, Bertie hears Julia and Danby are to be married, as are Gussie and Danby's daughter. Julia and Danby plan to perform together again. Fearing Aunt Agatha's ire, Bertie tells Gussie that, if Bertie is lucky, he will not be back in England for about ten years.

== Characters ==
1915 Saturday Evening Post illustration by Martin Justice

- Bertie
- Aunt Agatha, Bertie's aunt
- Jeeves, Bertie's valet
- Spencer Gregson, Aunt Agatha's husband (mentioned only)
- Augustus "Gussie" Mannering-Phipps, a.k.a. George Wilson, Bertie's cousin (not to be confused with Bertie Wooster's friend Gussie Fink-Nottle)
- Julia Mannering-Phipps, Gussie's mother
- Cuthbert Mannering-Phipps, Gussie's late father (mentioned only)
- Ray Denison, Gussie's fiancée
- Daisy Trimble, a wife to one of Bertie's pals (mentioned only)
- Barman in Gussie's hotel
- Abe Riesbitter, a vaudeville agent
- Joe Danby, Ray Denison's father
- Piano player in the music-room

== Style ==
Wodehouse often uses terms outside of their normal contexts for comedic effect. An example of this can be seen in the manner of speech used by Bertie Wooster, who makes use of unusual, exaggerated synonyms. This is illustrated in "Extricating Young Gussie", the first story in which Bertie appears, when Aunt Agatha expresses disapproval of this manner of speaking:

"What are your immediate plans, Bertie?"
"Well, I rather thought of tottering out for a bite of lunch later on, and then possibly staggering round to the club, and after that, if I felt strong enough, I might trickle off to Walton Heath for a round of golf."
"I am not interested in your totterings and tricklings."

Bertie often makes literary allusions. When describing the invigorating energy of New York City in the story, Bertie states that it makes one feel "God's in His Heaven: All's right with the world", a quotation from the dramatic poem Pippa Passes by Robert Browning. This precise quotation differs from the allusions Bertie makes in future Jeeves stories, in which Bertie generally gives only a vague version of the quotations he alludes to, and often relies on Jeeves's help to correctly finish them.

== Background ==
In contrast to the later stories in which he features, Jeeves is only a minor character in this story. He speaks just two lines, first when he announces Aunt Agatha, and second when Bertie suddenly tells Jeeves that they will shortly be going to America and Jeeves, unfazed, asks which suit Bertie will wear. In a 1948 letter he wrote to novelist Lawrence Durrell, Wodehouse wrote concerning Jeeves:

It never occurred to me at the time that he would ever do anything except appear at doors and announce people. Then – I don't think it was the next Bertie story but the one after that – I had got Bertie's friend into a bad tangle of some sort and I saw how to solve the problem but my artistic soul revolted at the idea of having Bertie suggest the solution. It would have been absolutely out of character. Then who? For a long time I was baffled, and then I suddenly thought 'Why not make Jeeves a man of brains and ingenuity and have him do it?' After that, of course, it was all simple and the stories just rolled out one after the other.

Another difference between "Extricating Young Gussie" and later Jeeves stories is that Bertie is not musically-inclined in this story, as he seems unfamiliar with Gussie's songs and states that he does not have an ear for music, whereas he shows much more interest in music in later stories, most notably when he sings competently in "Jeeves and the Song of Songs", plays the banjolele (though apparently not very well) in Thank You, Jeeves and composes lyrics for a hunting song in The Mating Season.

The 1918 story Jeeves and the Chump Cyril uses a similar plot device of Bertie being pressured by his Aunt Agatha to prevent a young man of his acquaintance from going on the New York stage. That story was also reworked as chapters nine and ten of The Inimitable Jeeves (1923).

== Publication history ==
The story was illustrated by Martin Justice in the Saturday Evening Post and by Alfred Leete in the Strand.

"Extricating Young Gussie" was included in the 1934 collection Methuen's Library of Humour: P. G. Wodehouse, published by Methuen & Co. Ltd.

== See also ==
- List of short stories featuring Jeeves, by publication date
- List of short stories and novels featuring Jeeves, by collected edition
