= Jeeves and the Hard-boiled Egg =

- Short story by P. G. Wodehouse
- 1917 Saturday Evening Post illustration by Henry Raleigh
- Country: United Kingdom
- Language: English
- Genre: Comedy

Publication
- Publisher: Saturday Evening Post (US); The Strand Magazine (UK)
- Media type: Print (Magazine)
- Publication date: 3 March 1917 (US); August 1917 (UK)

Chronology
- Series: Jeeves
Jeeves and the Unbidden Guest	The Aunt and the Sluggard

"Jeeves and the Hard-boiled Egg" is a short story by P. G. Wodehouse, and features the young gentleman Bertie Wooster and his valet Jeeves. The story was published in the Saturday Evening Post in the United States on 3 March 1917, and in The Strand Magazine in the United Kingdom in August 1917. The story was also included in the 1925 collection Carry On, Jeeves.

A friend of Bertie, "Bicky" Bickersteth, gets into financial trouble in the story. Jeeves proposes a scheme to help Bicky that involves Bicky's uncle and a convention of men from Birdsburg, Missouri.

== Plot ==
To the casual and irreflective observer it may sound a pretty good wheeze having a duke for an uncle, but the trouble about old Chiswick was that, though an extremely wealthy old buster, owning half London and about five counties up north, he was notoriously the most prudent spender in England. He was what Americans call a hard-boiled egg.

— Bertie thinks Chiswick is a hard-boiled egg (a hard man)

Bertie has grown a moustache, despite disapproval from Jeeves. Bertie's friend Francis "Bicky" Bickersteth comes to Bertie in search of advice. Bertie asks Jeeves to help. Doubtful, Bicky tells Bertie that the matter is private, but Bertie says that Jeeves probably already knows all about it anyway, and indeed he does: Bicky is in a dilemma since his uncle, the miserly Duke of Chiswick, who gives Bicky an allowance on the condition that Bicky improve himself financially, has decided to visit Bicky. Bicky, wishing to remain in New York, has been lying to his uncle about finding a business opportunity in the city.

Jeeves proposes that Bertie lend his flat to Bicky so that Bicky can pretend he owns a nice flat. Jeeves will pretend to be Bicky's valet. Bertie will remain as Bicky's guest, and Chiswick will have the second spare bedroom. After making a fuss over cab fare, Chiswick arrives, meeting Bertie and Jeeves. He is impressed by his nephew's flat. Bertie leaves to a club, meeting Bicky on the way out. Later, Bertie returns, and Jeeves tells him Bicky and his uncle have gone out. Some trouble has arisen: Chiswick, believing Bicky is now successful, is going to cancel his allowance.

Bicky comes up with a plan: starting a chicken-farm. Bertie wants to lend him the money to start one, but Bicky does not borrow money from friends. Jeeves suggests that Bicky could get the money from Americans who would pay to shake hands with His Grace. Jeeves manages to make a deal with a convention of 87 gentlemen from Birdsburg, Missouri; they will each shake Chiswick's hand and pay a total of one hundred and fifty dollars afterward. Bertie will secretly increase that sum to five hundred dollars. Bertie tells Bicky about the convention, and Bicky tells his uncle that some of his pals want to meet him. The gentlemen come, and things go smoothly until the Birdsburg men ask for a guarantee that Chiswick is really a duke, since they are paying money. Chiswick, who did not know about this payoff, rebukes them. The deal is off, and the Birdsburg men leave.

Bicky admits the truth about the Birdsburg men and his financial status. His uncle is furious, and threatens to cut off all money to Bicky. Jeeves, however, suggests that Bicky could sell the story of this encounter with the Birdsburg convention to a newspaper. Chiswick, who has a horror of publicity, is browbeaten into offering Bicky a secretarial job back in London. Bicky negotiates for a high salary of five hundred pounds a year. They leave. Impressed by Jeeves, Bertie tells him to fetch his shaving things and shave off his moustache. Jeeves, deeply moved, thanks him.

== Publication history ==
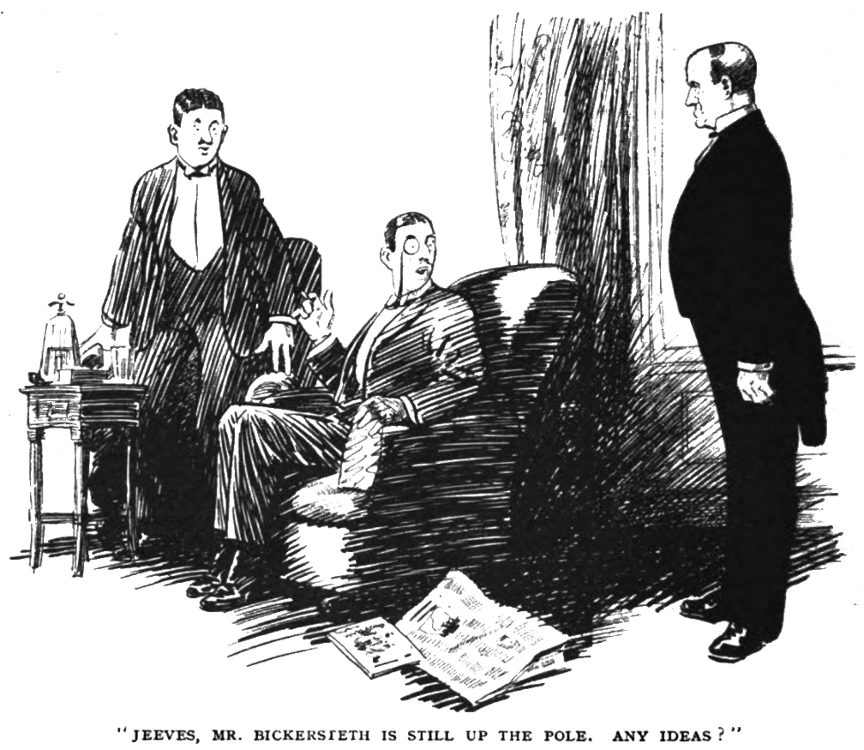
1917 Strand illustration by Alfred Leete

"Jeeves and the Hard-boiled Egg" was illustrated by Henry Raleigh in its 1916 publication in the Saturday Evening Post and by Alfred Leete in the Strand. The story was reprinted in the Saturday Evening Post in 1980 with illustrations by Phil Smith.

The story was included in the 1919 collection My Man Jeeves and in the 1925 collection Carry On, Jeeves. There are some minor differences between the versions in My Man Jeeves and Carry On, Jeeves. For example, the Duke of Chiswick says a certain taxi ride would have cost "eightpence" in London, and this amount is changed to "a shilling" in the Carry On, Jeeves version.

The American edition of the 1939 collection The Week-End Wodehouse also included the story.

== Adaptations ==
An episode of The World of Wooster adapted the story. The episode, titled "Jeeves and the Hard-Boiled Egg", was the fifth episode of the third series. It was originally broadcast in the UK on 3 November 1967.

This story was adapted into the Jeeves and Wooster episode "The Full House", the second episode of the third series, which first aired in the UK on 5 April 1992. There are some differences in plot, including:

- In the episode, Bicky works in New York as a writer, and the Duke of Chiswick is not Bicky's uncle, but his father: Edger Gascoyne Bickersteth.
- In the episode, it is Jeeves, not Bicky, who comes up with the idea to excuse Bicky from learning ranching in Colorado by telling Chiswick that Bicky has instead found a business opportunity in New York.
- In the episode, the Birdsburg gentlemen come to believe Chiswick is a fraud—they had paid to shake hands with the first Duke, not the eighth—and call in the police. When Chiswick learns he has been fooled, he chases after Bicky. Then the police, firing guns, give chase after Bicky, Chiswick, Bertie, and Jeeves.
- In the episode, Bertie does not plan to secretly give Bicky more money.
- Rather than become Chiswick's secretary, in the episode Bicky gets funding from Chiswick to start a chicken farm.
- Bertie does not have a moustache in this episode.
