= My Man Jeeves =

1919 short story collection by P. G. Wodehouse

- First edition
- Author: P. G. Wodehouse
- Language: English
- Series: Jeeves
- Genre: Comedy
- Publisher: George Newnes
- Publication date: May 1919
- Publication place: United Kingdom
- Preceded by: "Extricating Young Gussie"
- Followed by: The Inimitable Jeeves

My Man Jeeves is a collection of short stories by P. G. Wodehouse, first published in the United Kingdom in May 1919 by George Newnes. Of the eight stories in the collection, half feature the popular characters Jeeves and Bertie Wooster, while the others concern Reggie Pepper, an early prototype for Bertie Wooster.

Revised versions of all the Jeeves stories in this collection were later published in the 1925 short story collection Carry On, Jeeves. One of the Reggie Pepper stories in this collection was later rewritten as a Jeeves story, which was also included in Carry On, Jeeves.

== Publication history ==
British cover.

The book was published in the United Kingdom in May 1919 by George Newnes; it is a collection of short stories featuring either Bertie Wooster and Jeeves, or Reggie Pepper. Although the book was not published in the United States, all the stories had appeared there, mostly in The Saturday Evening Post or Collier's Weekly, and in the Strand in the UK, prior to the publication of the UK book.

Several appeared later in rewritten form in Carry On, Jeeves (1925). "Absent Treatment", "Brother Alfred" and "Rallying Round Clarence" were included in the US version of The Man with Two Left Feet (1917).

Jeeves and Wooster had first appeared in the short story "Extricating Young Gussie", which appeared in the Saturday Evening Post in 1915, and was included in The Man with Two Left Feet.

== Contents ==
- "Leave it to Jeeves" (revised as "The Artistic Career of Corky" in Carry On, Jeeves)
  - US: Saturday Evening Post, 5 February 1916
  - UK: Strand, June 1916
- "Jeeves and the Unbidden Guest" (included in Carry On, Jeeves)
  - US: Saturday Evening Post, 9 December 1916
  - UK: Strand, March 1917
- "Jeeves and the Hard-boiled Egg" (included in Carry On, Jeeves)
  - US: Saturday Evening Post, 3 March 1917
  - UK: Strand, August 1917
- "Absent Treatment" (Reggie Pepper)
  - UK: Strand, March 1911
  - US: Collier's Weekly, 22 August 1911
- "Helping Freddie" (Reggie Pepper, rewritten as the Jeeves story "Fixing it for Freddie" in Carry On, Jeeves)
  - UK: Strand, September 1911
  - US: Pictorial Review, March 1912 (as "Lines and Business")
- "Rallying Round Old George" (Reggie Pepper, rewritten as the Mr. Mulliner story "George and Alfred" in Plum Pie)
  - UK: Strand, December 1912
  - US: Collier's Weekly, 27 September 1913 (as "Brother Alfred")
- "Doing Clarence a Bit of Good" (Reggie Pepper, rewritten as the Jeeves story "Jeeves Makes an Omelette" in A Few Quick Ones)
  - UK: Strand, May 1913
  - US: Pictorial Review, April 1914 (as "Rallying Round Clarence")
- "The Aunt and the Sluggard" (Jeeves and Wooster, included in Carry On, Jeeves)
  - US: Saturday Evening Post, 22 April 1916
  - UK: Strand, August 1916

== Television ==
Clive Exton adapted the stories into a television series starring Hugh Laurie and Stephen Fry, as Jeeves and Wooster. It aired on ITV from 1990 to 1993.

== See also ==
- List of the Jeeves short stories
- List of all Jeeves' appearances

== Bibliography ==
- McIlvaine, Eileen; Sherby, Louise S.; Heineman, James H. (1990). P. G. Wodehouse: A Comprehensive Bibliography and Checklist. New York: James H. Heineman Inc. ISBN 978-0-87008-125-5.
- Midkiff, Neil (7 December 2017). "The Wodehouse short stories".
