= The Inferiority Complex of Old Sippy =

- Short story by P. G. Wodehouse
- Country: United Kingdom
- Language: English
- Genre: Comedy

Publication
- Publisher: The Strand Magazine (UK); Liberty (US)
- Media type: Print (Magazine)
- Publication date: April 1926

Chronology
- Series: Jeeves
Jeeves and the Impending Doom	Jeeves and the Yule-tide Spirit

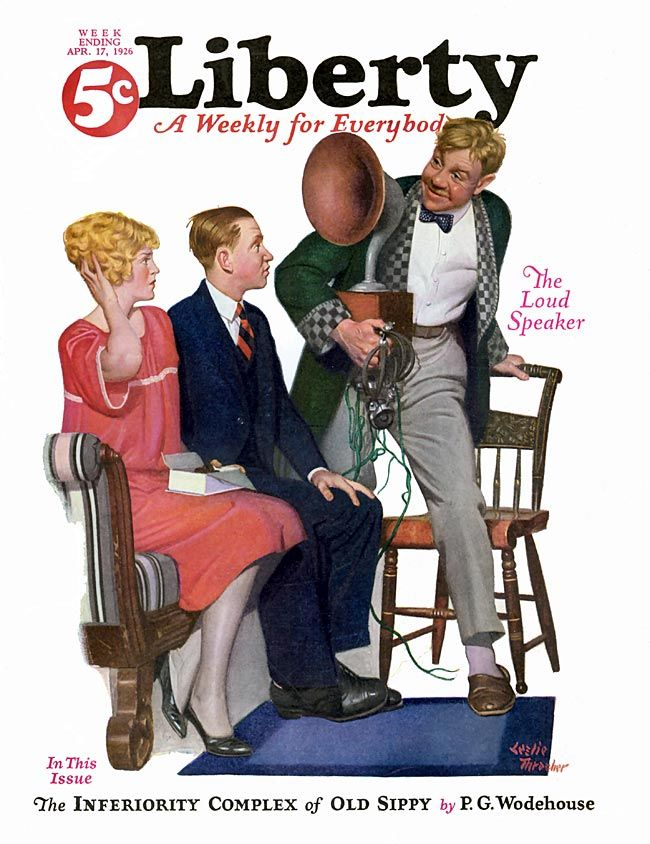
Liberty magazine cover on 17 April 1926

"The Inferiority Complex of Old Sippy" is a short story by P. G. Wodehouse, and features the young gentleman Bertie Wooster and his valet Jeeves. The story was published in The Strand Magazine in the United Kingdom in April 1926, and in Liberty in the United States that same month. The story was also included as the second story in the 1930 collection Very Good, Jeeves.

In the story, Bertie tries to help his friend, Oliver "Sippy" Sipperley, an editor of a light society magazine who is intimidated by his old school head master into publishing boring essays. Sippy is also in love with the poet Gwendolen Moon but is afraid to confess his feelings.

== Plot ==
Bertie bought a large china vase with crimson dragons and various animals on it for his flat. Jeeves disapproves of it. Bertie goes to see his friend Oliver "Sippy" Sipperley at the office of The Mayfair Gazette, where Sippy is now the editor. Sippy is afraid to confess his love to the poet Gwendolen Moon. He believes he is spiritually inferior to her because, one year prior, he spent thirty days in jail for punching a policeman on Boat Race night. An authoritative man arrives, and he tells Sippy that he has brought another article for Sippy's paper. Sippy meekly obeys him. The man leaves, and Sippy, agitated, tells Bertie that the man is Waterbury, head master of Sippy's old school. Sippy was intimidated by Waterbury as a child, so he is still too afraid of him to reject his articles, even though they are dull and not appropriate for Sippy's light society paper.

"Well, then, my firm conviction is that the scales will fall from Mr. Sipperley's eyes when he sees this Waterbury, this old head master, stagger into his office covered from head to foot with flour."
"Flour, sir?"
"Flour, Jeeves."
"But why should he pursue such a course, sir?"
"Because he won't be able to help it. The stuff will be balanced on top of the door, and the force of gravity will do the rest."

— Bertie tells Jeeves his plan

Bertie tells Jeeves that Sippy has an inferiority complex and feels subordinate to Waterbury. Jeeves will try to think of a way to help Sippy. However, Bertie comes up with a solution of his own: he will prepare a bag of flour over the door to Sippy's office to fall on Waterbury. The image of Waterbury covered in flour will embolden Sippy to stand up to him and also confess his feelings to Gwendolen. Jeeves suggests that it would be better for Sippy to first win Gwendolen's affection by faking an injury and calling out for her, then proposing to her. If she agrees, Sippy will have the courage to be firm with Waterbury. Bertie has doubts about this plan and tells Jeeves to buy a pound and a half of flour.

Bertie sets up the flour over the public door to Sippy's office. However, Waterbury boldly enters through Sippy's private office. Later, Sippy arrives, singing about love, and turns away Waterbury. Defeated, Waterbury leaves. Sippy tells Bertie he is engaged to Gwendolen, and he rushes off to see her.

Bertie meets Jeeves in the street. Jeeves explains he had telephoned Sippy to come to Bertie's flat, and had also called Gwendolen, telling her that Sippy had an accident. She was moved and came to see Sippy. As she was already in love with him, both shortly confessed and became engaged. To make the story of an accident credible, Jeeves had knocked out Sippy with a golf club. When Sippy came to, Jeeves told him that Bertie's new vase had fallen on him. Therefore, Jeeves had to smash the vase. This upsets Bertie, but before he can say anything, Jeeves points out that Bertie is missing his hat. Having left it in Sippy's office, Bertie goes to fetch it. He forgets to use the private door, and gets covered with flour. He decides not to help any more friends with inferiority complexes.

== Style ==
Early on in the series, Bertie starts showing concern about using the right words and sometimes searches for the right word to use. Starting in the late Jeeves short stories, Jeeves begins to fill in the word that Bertie is searching for, as when Bertie talks with Jeeves in "The Inferiority Complex of Old Sippy":

"The whole trouble being, Jeeves, that he has got one of those things that fellows do get—it's on the tip of my tongue."
"An inferiority complex, sir?"
"Exactly, an inferiority complex."

This device allows Jeeves to teach Bertie or remind him of words and concepts which Bertie can use later in comic ways. For example, the notion of a pal of Bertie's having a "complex" recurs after this story, such as when Bertie says in the first chapter of Right Ho, Jeeves that Gussie Fink-Nottle, who studies newts, has "a strong newt complex". The term "newt complex" is Bertie's comedic departure from "inferiority complex".

According to Kristin Thompson, Wodehouse uses cues to suggest offstage manipulations performed by Jeeves that Bertie is not aware of. For instance, Jeeves may make an enigmatic statement or do something unusual which is not explained later. In "The Inferiority Complex of Old Sippy", Jeeves brings Bertie's tea five minutes late, which is unusually negligent for Jeeves. Jeeves says he is late because he was dusting Bertie's new vase, but Thompson writes that the reader can infer that Jeeves was actually busy planning Sippy's "accident" with the vase, and adds, "Everything emphasizes this strange five-minute delay, yet there is no reference back to it. That fact alone should lead us to conclude that Jeeves was up to something. One effect of this scene is to point up how early Jeeves conceives his plan–and hence how he succeeds without luck or coincidence."

Similarly, in the story's last scene, it is not explained why Jeeves should have come along with Sippy when he could have waited for Bertie at the flat. According to Thompson, "Presumably he wants to tell Bertie the story of the vase before Bertie actually sees the fragments. In that way his convoluted explanation could confuse and impress Bertie as much as possible before he revealed the last bit of information–that the vase is broken."

== Publication history ==
The story was illustrated by Charles Crombie in the Strand and by Wallace Morgan in Liberty.

== Adaptations ==
The story was adapted for an episode of The World of Wooster. The episode, titled "Jeeves and the Inferiority Complex of Old Sippy", was the sixth episode of the first series. It was originally broadcast in the UK on 4 July 1965.

This story was not adapted into any Jeeves and Wooster episode.
