= Jeeves =

Fictional character in P. G. Wodehouse stories

Reginald Jeeves
- Jeeves character
- Jeeves on the cover of My Man Jeeves (1920)
- First appearance: "Extricating Young Gussie" (1915)
- Last appearance: Aunts Aren't Gentlemen (1974)
- Created by: P. G. Wodehouse
- Portrayed by: Stephen Fry; Michael Hordern; Dennis Price; others

In-universe information
- Full name: Reginald Jeeves
- Alias: Inspector Witherspoon
- Nickname: Reggie
- Gender: Male
- Occupation: Valet of Bertie Wooster
- Relatives: Charlie Silversmith (uncle); Cyril (uncle); Mrs Pigott (aunt); Emily (aunt); Annie (aunt); Queenie Silversmith (cousin); Egbert (cousin); Mabel (niece); more...
- Nationality: British

Jeeves (born Reginald Jeeves, nicknamed Reggie) is a fictional character in a series of comedic short stories and novels by the English author P. G. Wodehouse. Jeeves is the highly competent valet of a wealthy and idle young Londoner named Bertie Wooster. First appearing in print in 1915, Jeeves continued to feature in Wodehouse's work until his last completed novel, Aunts Aren't Gentlemen, in 1974.

Both the name "Jeeves" and the character of Jeeves have come to be thought of as the quintessential name and nature of a manservant, inspiring many similar characters as well as the name of an Internet search engine, Ask Jeeves, and a financial-technology company. A "Jeeves" is now a generic term, according to the Oxford English Dictionary.

Jeeves is a valet, not a butler; that is, he is responsible for serving an individual, whereas a butler is responsible for a household and manages other servants. On rare occasions he does fill in for someone else's butler. According to Bertie Wooster, he "can buttle with the best of them".

== Inspiration ==
A valet called Jevons appears in Wodehouse's 1914 short story "Creatures of Impulse", and may have been a prototype for Jeeves. Like Jeeves, Jevons is described as the perfect valet. "Creatures of Impulse" appeared in The Strand Magazine, and was not republished in any collection, though some parts went into the making of "The Crime Wave at Blandings".

In his 1953 semi-autobiographical book written with Guy Bolton, Bring on the Girls!, Wodehouse suggested that the Jeeves character was inspired by an actual butler named Eugene Robinson whom Wodehouse employed for research purposes. Wodehouse described Robinson as a "walking Encyclopaedia Britannica". However, Robinson worked at Wodehouse's house in Norfolk Street where Wodehouse did not live until 1927, long after Jeeves had been created.

Wodehouse named his Jeeves after Percy Jeeves (1888–1916), a popular English cricketer for Warwickshire. Wodehouse witnessed Percy Jeeves bowling at Cheltenham Cricket Festival in 1913. Percy Jeeves was killed at the Battle of the Somme in July 1916, less than a year after the first appearance of the Wodehouse character who would make his name a household word.

In a letter written in 1965, Wodehouse wrote that he had read Harry Leon Wilson's Ruggles of Red Gap when it was first published as a magazine serial in 1914 and it influenced the creation of Jeeves. Ruggles of Red Gap is a comedic novel about an English valet who is won by an American from an English earl in a poker game. In the letter, Wodehouse wrote, "I felt that an English valet would never have been so docile about being handed over to an American in payment of a poker debt. I thought he had missed the chap's dignity. I think it was then that the idea of Jeeves came into my mind."

The development of Jeeves and Bertie was influenced by Arthur Conan Doyle's Sherlock Holmes stories, according to Richard Usborne; Sherlock Holmes and Jeeves are "the great brains" while Dr. Watson and Bertie are "the awed companion-narrators, bungling things if they try to solve the problems themselves". Jeeves and Bertie have been described as comic versions of Holmes and Watson. Wodehouse directly compares Jeeves and Bertie to Holmes and Watson in some of the Jeeves stories, such as in Aunts Aren't Gentlemen.

== Fictional biography ==
=== Early life and family ===
Wodehouse disclosed little about Jeeves's early life. According to the character, he was privately educated, and his mother thought him intelligent.

Jeeves has an uncle, Charlie Silversmith, who is butler at Deverill Hall. Silversmith dandled Jeeves on his knee frequently when Jeeves was very young and, when Jeeves is an adult, they write regularly to each other. Charlie Silversmith's daughter Queenie Silversmith is Jeeves's cousin. Jeeves also mentions his late uncle Cyril in Right Ho, Jeeves. His niece Mabel is engaged to Bertie Wooster's friend Charles "Biffy" Biffen. His cousin Egbert is a constable and plays a role in the short story "Without the Option".

Jeeves has three placid aunts, in contrast to Bertie Wooster's aunts. Aunt Emily is interested in psychical research, and another aunt, Mrs. Pigott, owns a cat in Maiden Eggesford; this cat plays a major role in Aunts Aren't Gentlemen. Jeeves occasionally refers to an aunt without naming her, including one who read Oliver Wendell Holmes to him when he was young. In Right Ho, Jeeves, he mentions his Aunt Annie, though she was widely disliked.

=== Employment history ===
In his youth, Jeeves worked as a page boy at a girls' school. He apparently served in the military to some extent in World War I. In the play Come On, Jeeves, Jeeves states that he was a batman.

Shortly before entering Bertie's service, Jeeves was employed by Lord Frederick Ranelagh, who was swindled in Monte Carlo. Jeeves previously worked for Lord Worplesdon, resigning after nearly a year because of Worplesdon's eccentric choice of evening dress. Jeeves later helps Lord Worplesdon in Joy in the Morning. Other former employers include Mr. Digby Thistleton (later Lord Bridgnorth), who sold hair tonic; Mr. Montague-Todd, a financier who is in the second year of a prison term when Jeeves mentions him; and Lord Brancaster, who gave port-soaked seedcake to his pet parrot.

Jeeves becomes Bertie Wooster's valet. However, his tenure with Bertie Wooster has occasional lapses during the stories; at these times, Jeeves finds work elsewhere. Jeeves works for Lord Chuffnell for a week in Thank You, Jeeves, after giving notice because of Bertie Wooster's unwillingness to give up the banjolele, and is briefly employed by J. Washburn Stoker in the same novel. In Stiff Upper Lip, Jeeves, he serves as substitute butler for Bertie's Aunt Dahlia, and later enters Sir Watkyn Bassett's employment for a short time as part of a scheme to help Bertie. Jeeves is Lord Rowcester's butler for the length of Ring for Jeeves.

While working for Bertie Wooster, he occasionally pretends to be the valet of one of Bertie's friends as part of some scheme, though he is still actually Bertie's valet. He pretends to be the valet of Bicky Bickersteth in "Jeeves and the Hard-boiled Egg", Rocky Todd in "The Aunt and the Sluggard", and Gussie Fink-Nottle when Gussie masquerades as Bertie Wooster in The Mating Season. Jeeves acts as a bookmaker's clerk in Ring for Jeeves, disguising himself for the role with a check suit and walrus moustache. In the play Come On, Jeeves, which has mostly the same plot as Ring for Jeeves, it is mentioned that Jeeves changed his appearance as a bookmaker's clerk, though in the play, Jeeves also impersonates a medieval ghost named Lady Agatha, wearing makeup and women's medieval clothing to complete the disguise. He pretends to be a broker's man in "Jeeves and the Greasy Bird" and Bertie's solicitor in Aunts Aren't Gentlemen. In one instance, he pretends to be Bertie Wooster in a telephone conversation with playwright Percy Gorringe. In Stiff Upper Lip, Jeeves, he assumes an alias, calling himself Chief Inspector Witherspoon of Scotland Yard. This alias is also mentioned in Aunts Aren't Gentlemen.

Jeeves is a member of the Junior Ganymede Club, a London club for butlers and valets.

=== The stories ===
Jeeves is first hired by Bertie in "Jeeves Takes Charge" to replace a valet whom Bertie had fired for stealing from him. In this short story, Bertie briefly fires Jeeves after Jeeves, who believes that Bertie would not be happy with his fiancée Florence Craye, takes steps to end Bertie's engagement to her. Bertie quickly rehires Jeeves after realizing that Jeeves was right. Thereafter, Jeeves lives with Bertie, usually in their London residence at Berkeley Mansions. Over the course of the short stories and novels, Jeeves helps Bertie, frequently extricating him from unwanted engagements, and also assists Bertie's friends and relatives with various dilemmas. Jeeves often has another motive, such as disposing of an item recently acquired by Bertie that Jeeves does not like, for example a bright scarlet cummerbund. He sometimes receives a monetary reward from Bertie and other people he helps in early stories, though this does not occur in later stories.

Bertie and Jeeves experience a variety of adventures in numerous short stories and novels. Aside from changes in his employment status, some events occur that are particularly noteworthy for Jeeves. Jeeves gets engaged twice in "Jeeves in the Springtime", though he never talks about these fiancées afterwards, and it appears that he does not become engaged again. In the only story Jeeves narrates, "Bertie Changes His Mind", he opposes Bertie's decision to live with his nieces. Jeeves and Bertie visit Deverill Hall, where Jeeves's Uncle Charlie is employed as butler, in The Mating Season.

In the novel Ring for Jeeves, which is set after World War II, Jeeves temporarily works as Lord Rowcester's butler while Bertie is sent to a school where the idle rich learn to fend for themselves. This is the only story in which Jeeves appears without Bertie Wooster. The novel was adapted from the play Come On, Jeeves.

Jeeves's first name was not revealed until the penultimate novel, Much Obliged, Jeeves. Bertie Wooster learns Jeeves's name when he hears another valet greet Jeeves with "Hullo, Reggie." The readers may have been surprised to learn Jeeves's first name, but Bertie was stunned by the revelation "that he had a first name" in the first place. In the club book of Jeeves's club, the Junior Ganymede, all members must record the foibles of their employers to forewarn other butlers and valets. Bertie wants Jeeves to destroy his section. Jeeves is initially reluctant to defy his club's rules, but he eventually does destroy the pages for Bertie by the end of Much Obliged, Jeeves.

Jeeves last appears in Aunts Aren't Gentlemen, in which Jeeves and Bertie head to the rural village of Maiden Eggesford, though Jeeves wants to go to New York. He and Bertie visit New York at the end of the story.

== Personal characteristics ==
=== Age and appearance ===
While Bertie Wooster is approximately 24 years old in "Jeeves Takes Charge" (1916), Jeeves's age is not stated in the stories, and has been interpreted differently by various illustrators and adaptations. However, there are a few hints in the books regarding Jeeves's age.

When reaching for similes to describe Jeeves, Bertie frequently uses paternal comparisons or links him to other older figures, suggesting a more advanced age. In "Jeeves Takes Charge" (found in Carry On, Jeeves), Bertie tells us that Jeeves "looked down at [him] like a father gazing tenderly at the wayward child," and describes him as "cocking a paternal eye" when surveying Bertie's geraniums. In "Jeeves and the Impending Doom" (found in Very Good, Jeeves), Jeeves is described as giving Bertie a "warning look a wise old father might pass out to the effervescent son on seeing him going fairly strong with the local vamp." Jeeves is also described as fatherly towards Bertie's friends of the same age. In Chapter 14 of The Inimitable Jeeves, Jeeves "smiled in a paternal sort of way" when declining a sporting bet offered by Bertie’s contemporary, Claude Cattermole "Catsmeat" Potter-Pirbright, and that "Young Bingo was talking to Jeeves like a father on the subject of betting against the form-book" (Chapter 11). Elsewhere, Bertie compares Jeeves to other figures of definitely advanced age, such as when he describes Jeeves's soothing presence as making him "look like an old nurse" ("Jeeves Takes Charge") or compares his authority and omniscience to the graying information clerks at train stations ("Leave It to Jeeves"). Bertie explicitly describes Jeeves shooting him the look "a wise old father might pass out to the effervescent son" (Very Good, Jeeves, emphasis added). Cumulatively, such comparisons strongly suggest that Jeeves is of a sufficiently advanced age to be perceived by Bertie less like a peer and more like an elder guardian.

Besides such language, Jeeves is known to have a long employment history, and other references reinforce the idea that he is significantly older than Bertie Wooster. On the other hand, Jeeves is young enough to be engaged to a waitress courted by Bingo Little, who is the same age as Bertie Wooster, in "Jeeves in the Springtime". His niece, Mabel, is close in age to Bertie since she marries his school friend in "The Rummy Affair of Old Biffy", though the age-gap between niece and uncle is never specified. In Ring for Jeeves, Jeeves is described as resembling "a youngish High Priest of a refined and dignified religion".

In the reference work Wodehouse in Woostershire by Wodehouse scholars Geoffrey Jaggard and Tony Ring, it is speculated using information provided in the Jeeves canon that Bertie's age ranges from approximately 24 to 29 over the stories, and that Jeeves is roughly ten years older than Bertie, giving an age range of 35 to 40. This happens to agree with a personal letter Wodehouse wrote in 1961 to scholar Robert A. Hall Jr., in which Wodehouse, explaining that his characters did not age with real life time, gave an approximate age for Jeeves:

Keggs in A Damsel in Distress is supposed to be the same man who appears in The Butler Did It, but does it pan out all right? It doesn't if you go by when the books were written. The Damsel was published in 1919 and the Butler in 1957. But I always ignore real life time. After all, Jeeves—first heard of at the age presumably of about thirty-five in 1916—would now be around eighty-five, counting the real years.

Thompson suggests that the age gap between Bertie and Jeeves is roughly 20 years. According to the stage directions of Come On, Jeeves, Jeeves is depicted as being in his mid-forties. Though, it is worth noting the play is set in the 1950s (later adapted into the novel Ring For Jeeves), so this indicates the general age Jeeves may appear to be in the non-linear canon, rather than a chronological reference point.

In appearance, Jeeves is described as "tall and dark and impressive". When they first meet in "Jeeves Takes Charge", Bertie describes Jeeves as "a kind of darkish sort of respectful Johnnie" with "a grave, sympathetic face" and a nearly silent way of walking that Bertie equates to a "healing zephyr". On multiple occasions, Bertie states that Jeeves has "finely chiselled features", and a large head, which seems to Bertie to indicate intelligence. As Bertie says, Jeeves is "a godlike man in a bowler hat with grave, finely chiselled features and a head that stuck out at the back, indicating great brain power". Bertie also describes Jeeves's eyes as gleaming with intelligence.

=== Personality ===
Bertie frequently describes Jeeves as having a "feudal spirit". Jeeves enjoys helping Bertie and his friends, and solves Bertie's personal problems despite not being obliged to do so. Jeeves interrupts his vacation twice to come to Bertie's aid (in "The Love That Purifies" and Jeeves in the Offing). He regularly rescues Bertie, usually from an unwanted marriage but also from other threats, such as when he saves Bertie from a hostile swan or when he pulls Bertie out of the way of a taxi. Jeeves is evidently offended when a revolutionary tells him that servants are outdated in "Comrade Bingo".

Jeeves generally manipulates situations for the better and is described as "a kindly man" in Ring for Jeeves. However, he does influence Bertie's decisions to suit his own preferences, such as when he causes Bertie to change his mind about living with his nieces in "Bertie Changes His Mind". On other occasions, Jeeves manipulates events so that Bertie will take his vacation in an environment which Jeeves -- not Bertie -- prefers. Jeeves is also stubborn when opposing a new item that Bertie has taken a liking to, such as an alpine hat or purple socks. While he often stays on in spite of these radical objects, he can only withstand so much: the worst case is when he resigned after Bertie, privately labeling him as a "domestic Mussolini", resolved to study the banjolele in the countryside. Usually, Jeeves finds a way to help Bertie with a problem, and Bertie agrees to give away the item that Jeeves disapproves of. Even when Bertie and Jeeves are having a disagreement, Jeeves still shows sympathy, as much as he shows any emotion, when Bertie is in serious trouble.

Often wearing "an expression of quiet intelligence combined with a feudal desire to oblige", Jeeves consistently maintains a calm and courteous demeanor. When he feels discomfort or is being discreet, he assumes an expressionless face which Bertie describes as resembling a "stuffed moose" or "stuffed frog". When very surprised, he will raise his eyebrow a small fraction of an inch, and when he is amused, the corner of his mouth twitches slightly. His composure extends to his voice, which is soft and respectful. When he wishes to start a conversation, he sometimes makes a low gentle cough "like a very old sheep clearing its throat on a misty mountain top". He may also cough to signify disapproval. Bertie states that he saw the normally imperturbable Jeeves come "very near to being rattled" for the first time when the sight of Bingo Little in a false beard caused Jeeves to drop his jaw and steady himself with a table in "Comrade Bingo". In Joy in the Morning, Bertie claims that the only occasion on which he had ever seen Jeeves "really rattled" was when he first met Bertie's friend Boko Fittleworth, who wears turtleneck sweaters and flannel trousers with a patch on the knee; Jeeves "winced visibly and tottered off" to recover his composure in the kitchen, where Bertie supposes Jeeves pulled himself together with cooking sherry.

Bertie says that Jeeves is persuasive and magnetic. He believes that Jeeves could convince a candidate standing for Parliament to vote against herself. There is a poetic side to Jeeves, who recites a great deal of poetry. He is much affected when a parted couple reconciles, and tells Bertie that his heart leaps up when he beholds a rainbow in the sky.

It is not unusual for Bertie's acquaintances to ask for Jeeves's help directly without discussing it with Bertie, and Jeeves is willing to assist them even if Bertie is not involved in any way. Bertie once says that Jeeves "isn't so much a valet as a Mayfair consultant." On one occasion, Bertie considers it probable that even the distinguished Sir Roderick Glossop has consulted Jeeves, and says, "Jeeves is like Sherlock Holmes. The highest in the land come to him with their problems. For all I know, they may give him jewelled snuff boxes."

=== Skills ===
Jeeves presents the ideal image of the gentlemanly manservant, being highly competent, dignified, and respectful. He speaks intelligently and correctly, using proper titles for members of the nobility. One of his skills is moving silently and unobtrusively from room to room. According to Bertie, Jeeves noiselessly "floats" and "shimmers". Bertie once remarks, "Presently I was aware that Jeeves was with me. I hadn't heard him come in, but you often don't with Jeeves. He just streams silently from spot A to spot B, like some gas". In addition to being a proficient valet, Jeeves can serve capably as a butler, and does so on a few occasions. As Bertie says in Stiff Upper Lip, Jeeves, "If the call comes, he can buttle with the best of them."

Jeeves has an encyclopedic knowledge of literature and academic subjects. He frequently quotes from William Shakespeare and the Romantic poets. Well informed about members of the British aristocracy thanks to the club book of the Junior Ganymede Club, he also seems to have a considerable number of useful connections among various servants. Jeeves uses his knowledge and connections to solve problems inconspicuously. Richard Usborne, a leading scholar of the life and works of Wodehouse, describes Jeeves as a "godlike prime mover" and "master brain who is found to have engineered the apparent coincidence or coincidences". To form his plans, Jeeves often studies "the psychology of the individual" or the personality of one or more people involved in the situation. His mental prowess is attributed to eating fish, according to Bertie Wooster, who credits the phosphorus content in the fish with boosting Jeeves's brain power. Jeeves does not try to argue this claim, though at least once he says he does not eat a lot of fish.

One of Jeeves's greatest skills is making a special drink of his own invention, a strong beverage which momentarily stuns one's senses but is very effective in curing hangovers. The drink is Jeeves's version of a prairie oyster. Bertie first hires Jeeves after his hangover is cured by one of Jeeves's special drinks. Not simply a hangover cure, the drink can also give energy to someone who needs it, yet calm down someone who is agitated. Dark in colour, Jeeves's special pick-me-up is composed of Worcester sauce, a raw egg, and red pepper according to Jeeves, though Bertie suspects that the drink consists of more than that. Wodehouse mentions other ingredients in a personal letter he wrote late in his life, though these ingredients are not referred to in the stories. Additionally, Jeeves is capable of typing and writing shorthand.

Jeeves has knowledge in more dubious subjects as well. He is well-informed about how to steal paintings and kidnap dogs. He uses a Mickey Finn to incapacitate the unscrupulous Bingley. Capable of action when the situation calls for it, Jeeves uses a golf club to knock out Sippy Sipperley in "The Inferiority Complex of Old Sippy", and takes down a swan with a raincoat and boathook in "Jeeves and the Impending Doom". He finds it necessary to get Aunt Dahlia to knock out Bertie with a gong stick in "Jeeves Makes an Omelette", though he agrees with Bertie not to use this sort of tactic again. After Jeeves uses a cosh to knock out Constable Dobbs in The Mating Season, an astonished Bertie describes Jeeves as "something that would be gratefully accepted as a muscle guy by any gang on the lookout for new blood".

=== Hobbies ===
Jeeves often reads intellectual, "improving" books, including the works of Baruch Spinoza, Shakespeare, and "Dostoevsky and the great Russians". He also enjoys the works of the romance novelist Rosie M. Banks, and regularly reads The Times, which Bertie occasionally borrows to try the crossword puzzle. In "Jeeves in the Springtime", he went dancing in Camberwell, where he was seen by Bertie's friend Bingo Little. Bingo says that he saw Jeeves "swinging a dashed efficient shoe". Once a week, Jeeves takes the afternoon off to play bridge at his club, the Junior Ganymede.

One of Jeeves's hobbies is fishing, which he tends to do during his annual summer holiday, typically taken at Bognor Regis. Bertie sees him fishing in Joy in the Morning. Appreciating travel in general, Jeeves wants to go on a cruise in two different stories, "The Spot of Art" and The Code of the Woosters. Jeeves claims that travel is educational, though Bertie suspects that Jeeves has a Viking strain and "yearns for the tang of the salt breezes". Jeeves occasionally enjoys gambling, which is the reason he wishes to go to Monte Carlo in "Jeeves and the Yule-tide Spirit".

== Relationship with Bertie Wooster ==
The premise of the Jeeves stories is that the brilliant valet is firmly in control of his rich and unworldly young employer's life. Jeeves becomes Bertie Wooster's guardian and all-purpose problem solver, devising subtle plans to help Bertie and his friends with various problems. In particular, Jeeves extricates Bertie Wooster from engagements to formidable women whom Bertie reluctantly becomes engaged to, Bertie being unwilling to hurt a woman's feelings by turning her down. While Jeeves wants to keep Bertie from a fiancée whom he believes will not make Bertie happy, Jeeves also wants to keep his position, which he feels would be threatened by a wife. Jeeves also provides assistance when Bertie, who refuses to let a pal down, gets drawn into trouble trying to help a friend or a relative he is fond of. Bertie is usually unaware of the extent of Jeeves's machinations until all is revealed at the end of the story. On one occasion, Bertie acknowledges and accepts his role as a pawn in Jeeves's grand plan, though Jeeves objects, saying that he could have accomplished nothing without Bertie's cooperation.

For the most part, Bertie and Jeeves are on good terms. Being fond of Bertie, Jeeves considers their connection "pleasant in every respect". Bertie says that he looks on Jeeves as "a sort of guide, philosopher, and friend". At times when Bertie is separated from Jeeves, Bertie is miserable. When Bertie must stay by himself in a hotel in "The Aunt and the Sluggard", he struggles without having Jeeves there to press his clothes and bring him tea, saying "I don't know when I've felt so rotten. Somehow I found myself moving about the room softly, as if there had been a death in the family"; he later cheers himself up by going round the cabarets, though "the frightful loss of Jeeves made any thought of pleasure more or less a mockery". In Thank You, Jeeves, when Jeeves has left Bertie's employment because of their disagreement over a banjolele, Bertie still seeks Jeeves for help and Jeeves comes to his aid. Bertie dislikes when Jeeves goes on his annual holiday, stating, "without this right-hand man at his side Bertram Wooster becomes a mere shadow of his former self". Jeeves appreciates the praise that Bertie bestows on him, saying that "Mr. Wooster has always been gratifyingly appreciative of my humble efforts on his behalf".

Jeeves has firm ideas about how an English gentleman should dress and behave, and sees it as his duty to ensure that his employer presents himself appropriately. When friction arises between Jeeves and Bertie, it is usually over some new item about which Bertie Wooster is enthusiastic that does not meet with Jeeves's approval, such as bright purple socks, a white mess jacket, or a garish vase. Bertie becomes attached to these less conservative pieces and views Jeeves's opposition to them as "hidebound and reactionary", marking him "an enemy to Progress". This type of disagreement results in a period of coolness between them. The conflict is resolved by the end of the story, typically after Jeeves has helped Bertie with his latest problem. Bertie, grateful, agrees to have it Jeeves's way. He does not object if he learns that Jeeves, foreseeing that Bertie would agree to give up the item, has already disposed of it.

Bertie considers Jeeves to be a marvel, and wonders why Jeeves is content to work for him, stating, "It beats me sometimes why a man with his genius is satisfied to hang around pressing my clothes and what not". Jeeves has been offered twice the salary Bertie pays him by another gentleman, but still remains with Bertie. Jeeves views Bertie as being friendly but mentally negligible, though his opinion of Bertie's intelligence seems to improve over time. In an early story, he says that Bertie is "an exceedingly pleasant and amiable young gentleman, but not intelligent. By no means intelligent. Mentally he is negligible – quite negligible." Hearing this spurs Bertie to try to solve problems on his own, though he ultimately fails and needs Jeeves's assistance. Nonetheless, Jeeves's view of Bertie's intelligence has apparently softened by the first novel, when Jeeves says that Bertie "is, perhaps, mentally somewhat negligible, but he has a heart of gold". At one point in the ninth novel, Jeeves actually commends Bertie's quick thinking, saying that Bertie's tactic of hiding from an antagonist behind a sofa "showed a resource and swiftness of thought which it would be difficult to overpraise".

== Influence ==
Jeeves's name is used as a synonym for a personal manservant. A "Jeeves" is a generic term for a model valet or butler according to the Oxford English Dictionary and the Merriam-Webster Dictionary. It can mean a "resourceful helper" according to the Encarta World English Dictionary. In a comedy routine in a 1993 Seinfeld episode, Jerry Seinfeld said, "Did you ever notice a lot of butlers are named Jeeves? I think when you name a baby Jeeves; you've pretty much mapped out his future. Not much chance he's gonna be a hitman."

From 1996 until 2006, Ask.com, a question-and-answer search engine, was known as Ask Jeeves and featured a caricature of a butler on its launch page. The name of Jeeves has also been used by other companies and services, such as the British dry-cleaning firm Jeeves of Belgravia and the New Zealand company Jeeves Tours.

The fictional amateur detective Lord Peter Wimsey and his valet Mervyn Bunter, created by Dorothy L. Sayers in 1923, were partially inspired by Bertie Wooster and Jeeves.

Jeeves himself is parodied in the mashup "Scream for Jeeves".

The couple formed by the aristocrat Charlie Mortdecai and his valet Jock, protagonists of Kyril Bonfiglioli's Mortdecai series, are intended as a parody of Bertie and Jeeves.

== Jeeves series ==
=== List of stories ===
The Jeeves canon is a series of comedic stories following Bertie Wooster and his valet Jeeves, consisting of 35 short stories and 11 novels. With minor exceptions, the short stories were written and published first (between 1915 and 1930); the novels later (between 1934 and 1974). While the series of stories featuring the character of Jeeves are often referred to as the "Jeeves" stories, the series is also called by other names such as the "Jeeves and Wooster" or "Jeeves and Bertie" stories.

Bertie Wooster narrates (in the first person) all the stories but two, "Bertie Changes His Mind", which Jeeves narrates in the first person, and Ring for Jeeves, which features Jeeves, but not Bertie Wooster and is written in the third person.

Jeeves and Bertie first appeared in "Extricating Young Gussie", a short story published in the United States in September 1915, though it was not seen in the United Kingdom until 1916. In the story, Jeeves's role is minor, existing only to introduce Bertie's Aunt Agatha. The character is not developed beyond the role of a typical servant. Bertie's surname appears to be Mannering-Phipps as well. The first fully recognisable Jeeves and Wooster story was "Leave It to Jeeves", published in early 1916. As the series progressed, Jeeves assumed the role of Bertie Wooster's co-protagonist. Most of the Jeeves stories were originally published as magazine pieces before being collected into books, although 11 of the short stories were reworked and divided into 18 chapters to make an episodic semi-novel called The Inimitable Jeeves.

- The Man with Two Left Feet (1917) — One story in a book of thirteen
  - "Extricating Young Gussie" — The first appearances of Jeeves and Bertie, originally published 1915-09-18 in The Saturday Evening Post.
- My Man Jeeves (1919) — Four stories in a book of eight, all four reprinted (in slightly rewritten forms) in the 1925 collection Carry On, Jeeves. The non-Jeeves stories feature Reggie Pepper.
  - "Leave It to Jeeves", rewritten and retitled "The Artistic Career of Corky" in Carry On, Jeeves, originally published 1916-02-05 in the Saturday Evening Post.
  - "The Aunt and the Sluggard", slightly rewritten for Carry On, Jeeves, originally published 1916-04-22 in the Saturday Evening Post.
  - "Jeeves and the Unbidden Guest", slightly rewritten for Carry On, Jeeves, originally published 1916-12-09 in the Saturday Evening Post.
  - "Jeeves and the Hard-boiled Egg", slightly rewritten for Carry On, Jeeves, originally published 1917-03-03 in the Saturday Evening Post.
- The Inimitable Jeeves (1923) — A fix-up novel of eighteen chapters, originally published as eleven short stories. Some were split in the book.
  - "Jeeves Exerts the Old Cerebellum" with "No Wedding Bells for Bingo" (together "Jeeves in the Springtime", originally published December 1921 in the Strand and Cosmopolitan.)
  - "Aunt Agatha Speaks Her Mind" with "Pearls Mean Tears" (together "Aunt Agatha Takes the Count", originally published April 1922 in the Strand, revised for TIJ.)
  - "The Pride of the Woosters Is Wounded" with "The Hero's Reward" (together "Scoring off Jeeves", originally published February 1922 in the Strand.)
  - "Introducing Claude and Eustace" with "Sir Roderick Comes to Lunch" (together "Sir Roderick Comes to Lunch", originally published March 1922 in the Strand.)
  - "A Letter of Introduction" with "Startling Dressiness of a Lift Attendant" (together "Jeeves and the Chump Cyril", originally published 1918-04-03 in the Saturday Evening Post.)
  - "Comrade Bingo" with "Bingo Has a Bad Goodwood" (together "Comrade Bingo", originally published May 1922 in the Strand.)
  - "The Great Sermon Handicap", originally published June 1922 in the Strand.
  - "The Purity of the Turf", originally published July 1922 in the Strand.
  - "The Metropolitan Touch", originally published September 1922 in the Strand.
  - "The Delayed Exit of Claude and Eustace", originally published October 1922 in the Strand.
  - "Bingo and the Little Woman" with "All's Well" (together "Bingo and the Little Woman", originally published November 1922 in the Strand.)
- Carry On, Jeeves (1925) — Ten stories:
  - "Jeeves Takes Charge" — Recounts the first meeting of Jeeves and Wooster, originally published 1916-11-18 in the Saturday Evening Post.
  - "The Artistic Career of Corky", a rewrite of "Leave It to Jeeves", originally published in My Man Jeeves
  - "Jeeves and the Unbidden Guest", originally published in My Man Jeeves
  - "Jeeves and the Hard-boiled Egg", originally published in My Man Jeeves
  - "The Aunt and the Sluggard", originally published in My Man Jeeves
  - "The Rummy Affair of Old Biffy", originally published 1924.
  - "Without the Option", originally published 1925.
  - "Fixing it for Freddie", a rewrite of a Reggie Pepper story, "Helping Freddie", originally published in My Man Jeeves
  - "Clustering Round Young Bingo", originally published 1925-02-21 in the Saturday Evening Post.
  - "Bertie Changes His Mind" — The only story in the canon narrated by Jeeves, originally published August 1922 in the Strand and Cosmopolitan.
- Very Good, Jeeves (1930) — Eleven stories:
  - "Jeeves and the Impending Doom", originally published 1926.
  - "The Inferiority Complex of Old Sippy", originally published 1926.
  - "Jeeves and the Yule-tide Spirit" (U.S. title: Jeeves and the Yuletide Spirit), originally published 1927.
  - "Jeeves and the Song of Songs", originally published 1929.
  - "Episode of the Dog McIntosh" (alternate title: Jeeves and the Dog McIntosh, U.S. title: The Borrowed Dog), originally published 1929.
  - "The Spot of Art" (U.S. title: Jeeves and the Spot of Art), originally published 1929.
  - "Jeeves and the Kid Clementina", originally published 1930.
  - "The Love That Purifies" (U.S. title: Jeeves and the Love That Purifies), originally published 1929.
  - "Jeeves and the Old School Chum", originally published 1930.
  - "Indian Summer of an Uncle", originally published 1930.
  - "The Ordeal of Young Tuppy" (U.S. title: Tuppy Changes His Mind), originally published 1930.
- Thank You, Jeeves (1934) — The first full-length Jeeves novel
- Right Ho, Jeeves (1934) (U.S. title: Brinkley Manor)
- The Code of the Woosters (1938)
- Joy in the Morning (1946) (U.S. title: Jeeves in the Morning)
- The Mating Season (1949)
- (Come On, Jeeves — 1952 play with Guy Bolton, adapted 1953 into Ring for Jeeves, produced 1954, published 1956)
- Ring for Jeeves (1953) — Only Jeeves novel without Bertie Wooster (U.S. title: The Return of Jeeves), adapting the play Come On, Jeeves
- Jeeves and the Feudal Spirit (1954) (U.S. title: Bertie Wooster Sees It Through)
- A Few Quick Ones (1959) — One short story in a book of ten
  - "Jeeves Makes an Omelette", a rewrite of a Reggie Pepper story originally published in My Man Jeeves
- Jeeves in the Offing (1960) (U.S. title: How Right You Are, Jeeves)
- Stiff Upper Lip, Jeeves (1963)
- Plum Pie (1966) — One short story in a book of nine
  - "Jeeves and the Greasy Bird"
- Much Obliged, Jeeves (1971) (U.S. title: Jeeves and the Tie That Binds)
- Aunts Aren't Gentlemen (1974) (U.S. title: The Cat-nappers)

The collection The World of Jeeves (first published in 1967, reprinted in 1988) contains all of the Jeeves short stories, with the exception of "Extricating Young Gussie", presented more or less in narrative chronological order, with a new introduction by Wodehouse. This collection includes the original versions of the eleven stories that were altered by Wodehouse to create the episodic novel The Inimitable Jeeves.

=== Setting and timeline ===
The short stories are set primarily in London, where Bertie Wooster has a flat and is a member of the raucous Drones Club, or in New York City, though some short stories are set around various stately homes in the English countryside. The novels all take place at or near an English country house, most commonly Brinkley Court, Worcestershire (in four novels) and Totleigh Towers, Gloucestershire (in two novels).

The Jeeves stories are described as occurring within a few years of each other. For example, Bertie states in Jeeves and the Feudal Spirit (1954) that his Aunt Dahlia has been running her paper Milady's Boudoir, first introduced in "Clustering Round Young Bingo" (1925), for about three years. However, there are inconsistencies between the stories that make it difficult to construct a timeline. For instance, it is stated in Jeeves in the Offing that Aunt Dahlia ran her paper for four years, and not three, as is shown in Jeeves and the Feudal Spirit. Nonetheless, some scholars have attempted to create a rough timeline. J. H. C. Morris suggested that the Jeeves canon spanned approximately five years, stating that four Christmases are accounted for, and another must have passed during Bertie's time in America in the early stories, making five in all. Kristin Thompson also suggested that approximately five years passed during the stories, though Thompson instead relied on explicit references to time passed between events in the series.

The stories follow a floating timeline, with each story being set at the time it was written, while the characters do not change and past events are referred to as happening recently. This results in the stories following "two kinds of time", as the characters hardly age but are seen against the background of a changing world. This floating timeline allows for comedic references to films, songs, and politicians that would have been well known to readers when the stories were written. For example, in Jeeves and the Feudal Spirit (1954), when Bertie is surprised to hear that his Aunt Dahlia wants to sell her weekly paper, he remarks, "It was like hearing that Rodgers had decided to sell Hammerstein." (This is a reference to Rodgers and Hammerstein, who created popular Broadway musicals in the 1940s and 1950s.) Similarly, Aunts Aren't Gentlemen (1974) mentions evangelist Billy Graham, who did not become a public figure until the late 1940s. However, certain Edwardian era elements, such as aristocratic country houses and traditional gentlemen's clubs like the Drones Club, continue to be prevalent throughout the series, despite becoming less common in the real world. Several writers have described the Jeeves series as being set in the interwar period (1918–1939).

The setting is generally an idealised version of the world, with international conflicts being downplayed or ignored. Illness and injuries cause negligible harm, similar to downplayed injuries in stage comedy.

=== Comic style ===
The plots and dialogue of the Jeeves stories were strongly influenced by Wodehouse's experience writing for the stage, and the playlike quality of the stories is often comically exaggerated. For example, many stage comedies involve two sundered couples, and this number is increased to five for the plot of the Jeeves novel The Mating Season. Bertie frequently uses theatrical terminology to describe characters and settings. For instance, in Joy in the Morning, Bertie says that Lord Worplesdon's study "proved to be what they call on the stage a 'rich interior', liberally equipped with desks, chairs, tables, carpets and all the usual fixings." Later in the same scene, when Worplesdon sends his butler to fetch Jeeves, Bertie says, "During the stage wait, which was not of long duration, the old relative filled in with some ad lib stuff about Boko, mostly about how much he disliked his face" (chapter 22). The dialogue is sometimes written like in a script. For example, several lines of text in the first chapter of Right Ho, Jeeves are rendered in script format.

Wodehouse uses a number of what Kristin Thompson terms "delaying devices" to keep the competent Jeeves from solving problems too quickly. For example, Bertie sometimes cannot get help from Jeeves initially because Jeeves is away on vacation. In multiple stories, Jeeves delays solving Bertie's problem because he disapproves of an object Bertie has acquired. Jeeves is shown to be a "thoroughly pragmatic, occasionally Machiavellian figure" who is willing to delay solving problems until it is advantageous for him to do so. In some stories, Bertie insists on trying to handle problems himself. Jeeves, planning in the background, can estimate the extent of Bertie's mistakes in advance and incorporate them into his own plan in the end.

Wodehouse has Jeeves consistently use a very formal manner of speaking, while Bertie's speech mixes formal and informal language. These different styles are frequently used to create humour in the stories, such as when Bertie has to translate Jeeves's erudite speech for one of his pals who is not familiar with Jeeves. An example of this occurs in "The Artistic Career of Corky", when Jeeves comes up with a plan to help Bertie's friend Corky. Jeeves says his plan "cannot fail of success" but has a drawback in that it "requires a certain financial outlay". Bertie explains to Corky that Jeeves means "he has got a pippin of an idea, but it's going to cost a bit".

Jeeves often tells Bertie about his machinations at the end of the stories, but does not always reveal everything to Bertie. This can be seen in the only story narrated by Jeeves, "Bertie Changes His Mind", in which Jeeves manipulates events without telling Bertie. The reader can infer some of Jeeves's offstage activity from subtle clues in Bertie's narrative. For example, in "Jeeves and the Kid Clementina", Bertie ends up in a tree while trespassing as part of a task outlined by the mischievous Bobbie Wickham, and is confronted by a policeman. The only information given to the reader about how the policeman got there is when he says, "We had a telephone call at the station saying there was somebody in Miss Mapleton's garden." After reading the story, the reader can look back and infer that Jeeves called the police himself or got someone else to do it, knowing the incident would ultimately make Bertie seem heroic to Miss Mapleton and would make Bertie realize the dangers of Bobbie's scheming.

== Adaptations ==
=== Television ===
- The World of Wooster (30 May 1965 to 17 November 1967, 20 episodes of 30 minutes) was a half-hour comedy series for BBC1, with Dennis Price as Jeeves, and Ian Carmichael as Bertie Wooster.
- In the 1970s and 1980s, Jeeves and Bertie Wooster were portrayed by various actors in twelve commercials for Croft Original Sherry. One 1973 advertisement featured Jeremy Irons as Bertie Wooster.
- In the 1981 BBC Two documentary Thank You, P. G. Wodehouse, Jeeves was portrayed by Michael Aldridge and Bertie Wooster was portrayed by Jonathan Cecil.
- Jeeves and Wooster (22 April 1990 to 20 June 1993, 23 episodes of 50 minutes), a hit ITV series starring double act Fry and Laurie (with Stephen Fry as Jeeves, and Hugh Laurie as Bertie Wooster). The scripts for this series by Clive Exton have been praised for their fidelity to Wodehouse's original vision although there are some departures from the stories, including the use of Hugh Laurie's ability to sing and play boogie woogie piano to have Bertie perform such songs accompanied by Jeeves.

=== Film ===
- In 1919, two silent short comedy films, "Making Up with Mother" and "Cutting Out Venus", were released in the US. These shorts were inspired by the Reggie Pepper stories and directed by Lawrence C. Windom. Reggie Pepper, a prototype for Bertie Wooster, was given a manservant named "Jeeves" who was a reformed burglar. The shorts featured Lawrence Grossmith as Reggie Pepper and Charles Coleman as Jeeves.
- Thank You, Jeeves! (1936) was the first film to feature Jeeves and Bertie, with Arthur Treacher as Jeeves and David Niven as Bertie Wooster. In the film, they meet a girl and help her brother stop two spies trying to get his secret plans. The film has almost nothing to do with the book of that title, and Jeeves is portrayed as unhelpful and pompous. Step Lively, Jeeves! (1937) also featured Arthur Treacher as Jeeves, who is swindled into pursuing a phony inheritance. Bertie Wooster does not appear, Jeeves is portrayed as a naive bumbler, and the film has nothing to do with any Wodehouse story. Wodehouse was very unhappy with the two Treacher films and did not encourage continuation of the series.
- By Jeeves (2001) is a recorded performance of the musical, released as a video with British actor Martin Jarvis as Jeeves and American actor John Scherer as Bertie Wooster.

=== Radio ===
- "Leave It to Jeeves" (1940) is an episode of the American CBS radio series Forecast. It was not based on the Wodehouse short story originally titled "Leave it to Jeeves". Alan Mowbray portrayed Jeeves and Edward Everett Horton portrayed Bertie Wooster. The scriptwriter was Stuart Palmer.
- In the 1955 BBC Light Programme dramatisation of the novel Ring for Jeeves, Deryck Guyler portrayed Jeeves and Ian Carmichael portrayed Bill, Lord Rowcester. In the following 1956 dramatisation of Right Ho, Jeeves, Deryck Guyler again portrayed Jeeves, and Naunton Wayne portrayed Bertie Wooster.
- Jeeves is a 1958 LP record issued by Caedmon with Terry-Thomas as Bertie Wooster and Roger Livesey as Jeeves. Side one is the story "Indian Summer of an Uncle"; side two is "Jeeves Takes Charge". The album was re-released by Harper Audio in 1989.
- What Ho! Jeeves (1973 to 1981) is a BBC Radio 4 series adapting various Jeeves stories with Michael Hordern as Jeeves, and Richard Briers as Bertie Wooster. Later, rebroadcast on BBC Radio 4 Extra, as The Inimitable Jeeves.
- In 1988, David Suchet portrayed Jeeves and Simon Cadell played Bertie Wooster in the BBC Saturday Night Theatre radio adaptation of the novel Right Ho, Jeeves.
- In 1997, L.A. Theatre Works dramatised The Code of the Woosters, with Martin Jarvis as Jeeves (and Roderick Spode) and Mark Richard as Bertie Wooster. In 1998, the same organisation dramatised Thank You, Jeeves, with Paxton Whitehead as Jeeves and Simon Templeman as Bertie Wooster. Both dramatisations were adapted by Richard, who had previously adapted the novels as theatrical plays, and were recorded before a live audience.
- In 2006, BBC Radio 4 dramatised The Code of the Woosters for its Classic Serial series, with Andrew Sachs as Jeeves and Marcus Brigstocke as Bertie Wooster.
- Jeeves Live! (2007—2020) is an intermittent series of dramatic readings of Jeeves short stories, performed by Martin Jarvis in front of a live audience and broadcast on BBC Radio 4. The series includes the following eight stories: "Fixing It for Freddie", "Bertie Changes His Mind", "Jeeves and the Song of Songs", "Jeeves Takes Charge", "The Aunt and the Sluggard", "Jeeves and the Yule-Tide Spirit", "Indian Summer of an Uncle", and "The Great Sermon Handicap". Two other stories aired under the title Jeeves in Manhattan, "Jeeves and the Unbidden Guest" and "The Artistic Career of Corky". Six of these readings were recorded live at the Cheltenham Literature Festival.
- In 2014, Martin Jarvis portrayed Jeeves and Jamie Bamber portrayed Bill, Lord Rowcester, in a radio drama adapting Ring for Jeeves for BBC Radio 4's Classic Serial series.
- In 2018, Stiff Upper Lip, Jeeves was adapted as a radio drama for BBC Radio 4. Martin Jarvis portrayed Jeeves and James Callis portrayed Bertie Wooster.

=== Theatre ===
- Come On, Jeeves (opened 1954, still presented from time to time as of 2017 under its name or as Ring for Jeeves) is a 1952 play by Guy Bolton and Wodehouse (adapted into the 1953 novel Ring for Jeeves), opened 1954 in Worthing, England (cast unknown), published in 1956.
- The Jeeves novel The Mating Season was dramatized as a play by Marjorie Duhan Adler, under the title Too Much Springtime. The play was published by the Dramatic Publishing Company in Chicago in 1955.
- The original theatre production of Jeeves Takes Charge starring Edward Duke was co-devised by James and Edward Duke with Hugh Wooldridge in 1980. Wooldridge also directed and lit this world premiere production at the Lyric Theatre, Hammersmith. A brand new production of Jeeves Takes Charge with Sam Harrison opens at the Theatre Royal, Bath, in December 2024, again directed by Hugh Wooldridge.
- Mark Richard dramatised multiple Jeeves novels for the stage: Right Ho, Jeeves (premiered 1993), The Code of the Woosters (1994), Jeeves and the Feudal Spirit (1995), Thank You, Jeeves (1996), and Jeeves in the Morning (1997). Richard portrayed Bertie Wooster in these productions, with Page Hearn as Jeeves. They reprised their roles for Hearn's dramatisation of a Jeeves novel, Jeeves and the Mating Season (2001). These productions were presented by the City Lit Theater Company in Chicago. Richard adapted the scripts of The Code of the Woosters and Thank You, Jeeves for L.A. Theatre Works radio productions.
- Playwright Margaret Raether has adapted five plays from the Jeeves stories which have been presented at multiple theatres in the United States. The plays are: Jeeves Intervenes (premiered 2006), Jeeves in Bloom (2009), Jeeves Takes a Bow (2012), Jeeves at Sea (2015), and Jeeves Saves the Day (2020). Jeeves Intervenes is loosely based on "Jeeves and the Hard-boiled Egg", and Jeeves in Bloom on Right Ho, Jeeves. The plot of Jeeves Takes a Bow involves a friend of Bertie's who takes an interest in performing on the stage (a plot point used in "Extricating Young Gussie" and "Jeeves and the Chump Cyril"), and in Jeeves at Sea, another friend of Bertie's pretends to be his own twin brother (in circumstances similar to those in Wodehouse's Reggie Pepper story "Rallying Round Old George").
- Jeeves and Wooster in Perfect Nonsense, a play based on the novel The Code of the Woosters, premiered in 2013 with Matthew Macfadyen as Jeeves and Stephen Mangan as Bertie Wooster.

=== Musicals ===
- Jeeves (22 April 1975 to 24 May 1975, 38 performances), an unsuccessful musical loosely based on Wodehouse, opened in London (with Michael Aldridge as Jeeves, and David Hemmings as Bertie Wooster). Music by Andrew Lloyd Webber, lyrics and book by Alan Ayckbourn, based on the novel The Code of the Woosters.
- By Jeeves (1 May 1996 to 12 February 1997; 28 October 2001 to 30 December 2001, 73 performances), a more successful complete rewrite of the earlier version, opened in London (with Malcolm Sinclair as Jeeves, and Steven Pacey as Wooster), and premiered in the US in November 1996 (with Richard Kline as Jeeves, and John Scherer as Wooster). It was produced again in 2001 on Broadway (with Martin Jarvis as Jeeves, and Scherer as Wooster), with one recorded performance released as a video film and aired on television.

=== Comics ===
- In Alan Moore's comic The League of Extraordinary Gentlemen: Black Dossier (2007), Jeeves appears in the segment "What Ho, Gods of the Abyss?" in which he contacts the League through a cousin in the British Museum to help combat the arrival of a Mi-go to Brinkley Court and Bertie Wooster's Aunt Dahlia's possession by Cthulhu.
- The Japanese manga series Please, Jeeves (2008–2014) adapts many of the Jeeves short stories. It was translated by Tamaki Morimura and illustrated by Bun Katsuta.

=== Literature ===
- Jeeves: A Gentleman's Personal Gentleman (1981), a non-canonical extended biography of Jeeves by C Northcote Parkinson, offers background information about the servant. The book originated as a star-studded charity recording in 1979, and ended with Bertie Wooster marrying Bobbie Wickham.
- The short story "Clubs are Trumps" was written by Hugh Kingsmill as a sequel to the Jeeves story "The Purity of the Turf". It was published in 1931 in an issue of The English Review, and reprinted in The Best of Hugh Kingsmill, published in 1970 by Victor Gollancz, London.
- In the 20 May 1953 issue of Punch, writer Julian Maclaren-Ross wrote a parody of the Jeeves stories titled "Good Lord, Jeeves". In the story, Bertie loses his wealth and needs a job; Jeeves, who has just been elevated to the peerage, hires Bertie as his valet. Wodehouse wrote to Maclaren-Ross saying how much he liked it. It was included in Maclaren-Ross's book The Funny Bone, published in 1956 by Elek, London.
- In the 1970s and 1980s, Jeeves and Bertie Wooster were featured in a number of full-page magazine print advertisements for Croft Original Sherry. The advertisements each had comedic prose imitating Wodehouse's writing style and a colour illustration similar to the magazine illustrations that originally appeared with many of Wodehouse's stories. These ads were extended into TV commercial campaigns, which ran throughout the 1980s.
- "Scream for Jeeves" (1990) was written under the pseudonym H. P. G. Wodecraft (actually Peter Cannon) and published in Crypt of Cthulhu #72. It purports to put Jeeves and Bertie Wooster into the action of Lovecraft's "The Rats in the Walls". It was later included in Scream for Jeeves: A Parody (1994), which contains two more Lovecraft fusions, titled "Something Foetid" and "The Rummy Affair of Young Charlie".
- Wake Up, Sir! (2005) by Jonathan Ames is a homage to the Bertie and Jeeves novels.
- Jeeves and the Wedding Bells (2013), a pastiche novel authorized by the Wodehouse estate, was written by British novelist Sebastian Faulks, who became the first writer authorized by the Wodehouse estate to produce a new fiction utilizing the Jeeves and Wooster characters.
- The short story "Greeves and the Evening Star" by Matt Hughes, published in the 2015 anthology Old Venus, is a science fiction parody of Jeeves and Wooster that takes place on the planet Venus. The characters based on Jeeves and Bertie Wooster are renamed Greeves and Bartie Gloster.
- Jeeves and the King of Clubs (2018), a pastiche novel authorized by the Wodehouse estate, was written by Ben Schott. A sequel by Schott titled Jeeves and the Leap of Faith was released in 2020.
- Jeeves Again: Twelve Original Stories from the World of PG Wodehouse (2025) by Roddy Doyle and Frank Skinner.

== See also ==
- List of Jeeves characters, an alphabetical list of Jeeves characters
- List of P. G. Wodehouse characters § Jeeves and Wooster, a categorized outline of Jeeves characters
- P. G. Wodehouse locations, including those in the Jeeves stories
- List of fictional butlers, also including once-butler valets such as Jeeves
