= Carry On, Jeeves =

1925 short story collection by P. G. Wodehouse

- First edition (UK)
- Author: P. G. Wodehouse
- Language: English
- Series: Jeeves
- Genre: Comedy
- Publisher: Herbert Jenkins (UK); George H. Doran (US)
- Publication date: 9 October 1925 (UK); 7 October 1927 (US)
- Publication place: United Kingdom
- Preceded by: The Inimitable Jeeves
- Followed by: Very Good, Jeeves

Carry On, Jeeves is a collection of ten short stories by P. G. Wodehouse. It was first published in the United Kingdom on 9 October 1925 by Herbert Jenkins, London, and in the United States on 7 October 1927 by George H. Doran, New York. Many of the stories had previously appeared in the Saturday Evening Post, and some were rewritten versions of stories in the collection My Man Jeeves (1919). The book is considered part of the Jeeves canon.

The first story in the book, "Jeeves Takes Charge", describes Jeeves' arrival in his master's life, as a replacement for Wooster's previous, thieving valet, and features Lady Florence Craye, as well as a passing mention of Lord Emsworth and Blandings Castle.

Several of the other stories are set in New York, and the book includes appearances by regular characters Bingo Little, Aunt Dahlia, Anatole, and Sir Roderick Glossop.

== Contents ==
- "Jeeves Takes Charge" — Bertie hires Jeeves for the first time, and Bertie's fiancée Florence Craye wants Bertie to destroy his uncle's memoirs.
  - US: Saturday Evening Post, 18 November 1916
  - UK: Strand, April 1923
- "The Artistic Career of Corky" — Corky, a struggling artist who relies on his uncle, is afraid his uncle won't approve of his fiancée. Jeeves suggests a plan involving books about birds.
  - US: Saturday Evening Post, 5 February 1916 (as "Leave It to Jeeves")
  - UK: Strand, June 1916 (as "Leave It to Jeeves")
- "Jeeves and the Unbidden Guest" — Bertie is told to look after Motty, the sheltered son of a friend of Aunt Agatha's, and keep him out of trouble. Motty, however, wants to make the most of his time in New York.
  - US: Saturday Evening Post, 9 December 1916
  - UK: Strand, March 1917
- "Jeeves and the Hard-boiled Egg" — Bicky, one of Bertie's friends, has lied to his uncle about his wealth and is in trouble when his miserly uncle comes to visit. Jeeves suggests a plan involving a convention of gentlemen from Birdsburg, Missouri.
  - US: Saturday Evening Post, 3 March 1917
  - UK: Strand, August 1917
- "The Aunt and the Sluggard" — Bertie's friend Rocky, a poet who lives quietly in the country, is troubled when his aunt tells him to go to parties and clubs in New York and write her letters about it.
  - US: Saturday Evening Post, 22 April 1916
  - UK: Strand, August 1916
- "The Rummy Affair of Old Biffy" — Biffy, who is forgetful, can't remember the surname or address of the woman he loves. After he ends up unhappily engaged to Honoria Glossop instead, he goes to Bertie for help.
  - US: Saturday Evening Post, 27 September 1924
  - UK: Strand, October 1924
- "Without the Option" — Sippy, who is financially dependent on his aunt, is expected to stay with his aunt's ghastly friends. After Bertie inadvertently gets Sippy stuck in prison, Bertie must take Sippy's place.
  - US: Saturday Evening Post, 27 June 1925
  - UK: Strand, July 1925
- "Fixing it for Freddie" — After Freddie Bullivant is rejected by his fiancée Elizabeth Vickers, Bertie invites him to Marvis Bay. Bertie gets an idea to reconcile the two when he sees Elizabeth playing with a child on the beach.
  - First published in this volume
  - Canada: Canadian Home Journal, September 1928
- "Clustering Round Young Bingo" — Bingo Little's wife wants a new housemaid, Aunt Dahlia wants a new cook, and Bingo Little wants his wife's article suppressed. Bertie tries to sort everything out with help from Jeeves.
  - US: Saturday Evening Post, 21 February 1925
  - UK: Strand, April 1925
- "Bertie Changes His Mind" — After Bertie expresses interest in taking in his three nieces, Jeeves, who is against this idea, arranges for Bertie to give a speech to an audience of young girls.
  - UK: Strand, August 1922
  - US: Cosmopolitan, August 1922

== See also ==
- List of the Jeeves short stories
