= The Artistic Career of Corky =

- Short story by P. G. Wodehouse
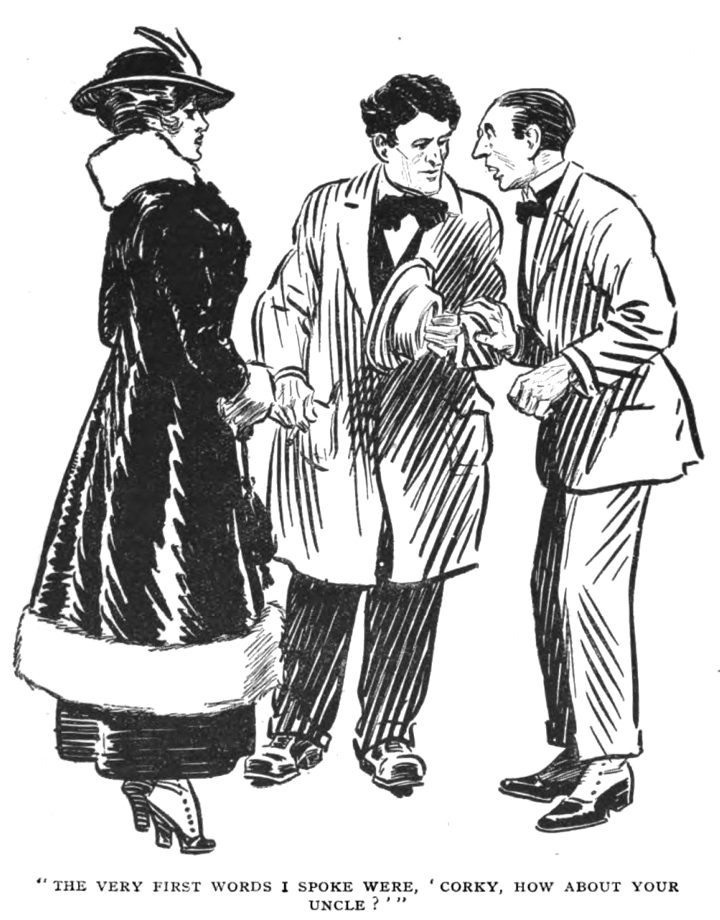
- 1916 Strand illustration by Alfred Leete
- Country: United Kingdom
- Language: English
- Genre: Comedy

Publication
- Publisher: Saturday Evening Post (US); The Strand Magazine (UK)
- Media type: Print (Magazine)
- Publication date: February 1916 (US); June 1916 (UK)

Chronology
- Series: Jeeves
Jeeves Takes Charge	Jeeves and the Unbidden Guest

"The Artistic Career of Corky" is a short story by P. G. Wodehouse, and features the young gentleman Bertie Wooster and his valet Jeeves. The story was published in the Saturday Evening Post in the United States in February 1916, and in The Strand Magazine in the United Kingdom in June 1916, as "Leave it to Jeeves". The story was also included in the 1925 collection Carry On, Jeeves.

The story takes place in New York. The artist Corky, a friend of Bertie's, wants to get approval from his uncle to marry his fiancée Muriel. To help Corky, Jeeves proposes a plan that involves books about American birds.

== Plot ==
Bertie is in New York. His friend, Bruce "Corky" Corcoran, a struggling artist, relies on an allowance from his rich uncle Alexander Worple, who runs a jute business. Corky introduces his fiancée, Muriel Singer, to Bertie. Corky is afraid that his disagreeable uncle will not approve of her. At Bertie's bidding, Jeeves suggests that, since Mr. Worple wrote a book about birds called "American Birds", Muriel should write "The Children's Book of American Birds" and dedicate it to Mr. Worple, and then send Worple a letter thanking him for his work and asking to meet him. Muriel does not feel she can write a book, so Jeeves proposes they pay a ghostwriter. To help Corky and Muriel, Bertie pays to have the book written and published. Worple replies to Muriel's letter that he would be happy to meet her.

Bertie leaves town for several months to be with friends in the country. He returns to New York and spots Muriel in a restaurant. She has married Alexander Worple. Shocked, Bertie returns to his flat and tells Jeeves, though Jeeves is not surprised, having known this was a possibility. Bertie, uneasy about seeing Corky after this, avoids Corky, but eventually visits Corky after reading in the paper that Muriel and Worple have had a son. Bertie learns that Corky has been commissioned by his uncle to paint a picture of the baby. The situation is terrible for Corky, but he has no choice.

"I've got through the mere outward appearance, and have put the child's soul on canvas."
"But could a child of that age have a soul like that? I don't see how he could have managed it in the time."

— Corky and Bertie, about Corky's painting

Later, Corky asks Bertie to see the painting. Bertie finds it ugly. Corky believes he has painted the soul of his model. Worple arrives and is appalled by the painting, calling it an extract from a comic supplement. He ends Corky's allowance, leaving Corky distraught. Jeeves, taking inspiration from Worple's comment, believes that the picture could be the foundation for a series of comedic drawings, and suggests the title "The Adventures of Baby Blobbs". Corky cheerfully agrees. The drawings become successful and Corky gives Jeeves a generous reward. Bertie decides to wear a blue suit with a faint red stripe, but Jeeves wants him to wear a brown suit; Bertie agrees to have it Jeeves's way.

== Style ==
Bertie Wooster's language mixes slang with ordinary phrasing, for example when Bertie describes Corky: "His principal source of income, however, was derived from biting the ear of a rich uncle—one Alexander Worple, who was in the jute business. I'm a bit foggy as to what jute is, but it's apparently something the populace is pretty keen on, for Mr. Worple had made quite an indecently large stack out of it."

In contrast to Bertie, Jeeves speaks in a continuously lofty, formal manner, with long sentences and a high proportion of scholarly words. Jeeves's speech is sometimes used as a source of humour, such as when Bertie has to translate Jeeves's erudite language for others, which occurs in "The Artistic Career of Corky":

"The scheme I would suggest cannot fail of success, but it has what may seem to you a drawback, sir, in that it requires a certain financial outlay."
"He means," I translated to Corky, "that he has got a pippin of an idea, but it's going to cost a bit."

== Background ==
Wodehouse realized the potential of Jeeves, who originally had only a minor role in his debut story "Extricating Young Gussie", while writing this story. In his introduction to The World of Jeeves, Wodehouse wrote:

I find it curious, now that I have written so much about him, to recall how softly and undramatically Jeeves first entered my little world... It was only some time later, when I was going into the strange affair which is related under the title of "The Artistic Career of Corky", that the man's qualities dawned upon me. I still blush to think of the off-hand way I treated him at our first encounter.

== Publication history ==
1916 Saturday Evening Post illustration by Tony Sarg

Under the title "Leave it to Jeeves", the story was illustrated by Tony Sarg in the Saturday Evening Post, and by Alfred Leete in The Strand Magazine.

The story was included in the 1919 collection My Man Jeeves under the title "Leave it to Jeeves". It was slightly rewritten when included in Carry On, Jeeves (1925) and retitled "The Artistic Career of Corky". There are multiple differences between the two book versions. For example, the introductory passage of the My Man Jeeves version, which begins with Bertie introducing Jeeves as "my man, you know", was cut from the version published in Carry On, Jeeves.

Under the title "The Artistic Career of Corky", the story was included in the 1958 collection Selected Stories by P. G. Wodehouse.

== Adaptations ==
This story was adapted into the Jeeves and Wooster episode "Introduction on Broadway", the third episode of the third series, which first aired in the UK on 12 April 1992. There are some differences in plot, including:

- In the original story, Corky did not paint any portraits other than the baby's portrait; the episode shows him painting a portrait of Bertie.
- In the episode, Bertie first tries pretending to be in the jute business to convince Worple to approve Corky's engagement.
- In the episode, Jeeves himself writes "The Children's Book of American Birds"; in the original story it was a friend of Corky's, Sam Patterson.
- In the original story, Corky claims he did not intend to paint the unattractive soul of the model; in the episode he proudly proclaims he has done this.
- In the original story, Worple inspired Jeeves's solution by calling the painting an extract from a comic supplement, and the baby's portrait becomes the foundation for a series of comedic drawings in a paper called the Sunday Star. In the episode, Jeeves buys the painting for ten pounds, and causes the painting to become popular in the art world. He earns a commission by acting as an agent for Corky.
