= Jeeves and the Unbidden Guest =

- Short story by P. G. Wodehouse
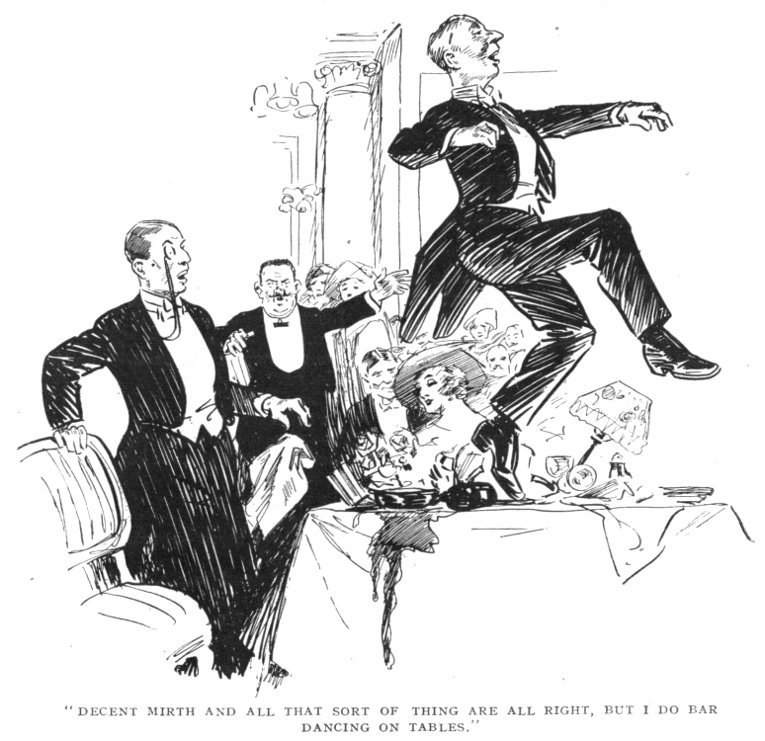
- 1917 Strand illustration by Alfred Leete
- Country: United Kingdom
- Language: English
- Genre: Comedy

Publication
- Publisher: Saturday Evening Post (US); The Strand Magazine (UK)
- Media type: Print (Magazine)
- Publication date: December 1916 (US); March 1917 (UK)

Chronology
- Series: Jeeves
The Artistic Career of Corky	Jeeves and the Hard-boiled Egg

"Jeeves and the Unbidden Guest" is a short story by P. G. Wodehouse, and features the young gentleman Bertie Wooster and his valet Jeeves. The story was published in the Saturday Evening Post in the United States in December 1916, and in The Strand Magazine in the United Kingdom in March 1917. The story was also included in the 1925 collection Carry On, Jeeves.

In the story, Bertie is instructed to look after Motty, the sheltered son of an aristocratic friend of Aunt Agatha, but has difficulty keeping Motty out of trouble.

== Plot ==
The story takes place in New York. Jeeves wants Bertie to wear the White House Wonder, a hat of the style worn by President Coolidge, though Bertie wears the Broadway Special hat instead. Jeeves also protests Bertie's pink tie, which Bertie wears anyway. Bertie is visited by a friend of his Aunt Agatha, Lady Malvern, and her ladyship's son, Wilmot "Motty", Lord Pershore. Lady Malvern tells Bertie to let Motty, a meek young man who sucks his walking stick, live with him while she tours American prisons for a book she is writing. She says that Motty is a vegetarian, teetotaller, and quiet reader. Troubled, Bertie seeks sympathy from Jeeves, but Jeeves remains distant.

"Listen to me, old thing: this is the first time in my life that I've had a real chance to yield to the temptations of a great city. What's the use of a great city having temptations if fellows don't yield to them?"

— Motty makes the most of New York

One night, Bertie comes home and sees that Motty is not there. Also, none of Motty's books have been touched. There is a thud on the door, and Jeeves answers it. Motty is lying on the mat outside, moaning and drunk. Bertie and Jeeves carry him to bed. In the morning, Motty, having drunk one of Jeeves's special hangover cures, is cheerful. He intends to make the most of his time in New York. He goes out partying. Bertie tries to chaperone once but cannot keep up with Motty. Bertie is concerned that Lady Malvern and Aunt Agatha will blame him. Then Motty starts bringing noisy friends to Bertie's flat. Bertie is bitten by Rollo, a bull-terrier that Motty won in a raffle. Irritated, Bertie leaves to stay with his friend Rocky Todd in the country. However, Bertie is bored there and returns in a week.

When Bertie returns home, Jeeves tells him that Motty gave Rollo away after Rollo bit him on the leg. Bertie is pleased. Jeeves also mentions that Motty is in prison after assaulting a constable. Bertie, worried, does not want to explain this to Lady Malvern. Jeeves suggests telling her that Motty is visiting Boston. Bertie says this to Lady Malvern when she returns. She asks him how he accounts, then, for her seeing Motty at a prison. She accuses Bertie of leading Motty astray. Jeeves appears, and says Bertie was repeating what Jeeves told him, but that really Motty went to prison voluntarily to do research for Lady Malvern's book. Lady Malvern is touched and apologizes to Bertie.

Grateful, Bertie tells Jeeves to burn the pink tie and get him the White House Wonder hat. Jeeves thanks him. Bertie asks if there is anything else Jeeves would like. Jeeves says fifty dollars, which he owes to Motty. Jeeves had wagered fifty dollars that Motty would not punch a passing policeman, and Motty had won the wager. Bertie gives Jeeves a hundred dollars.

== Differences between editions ==
In the version of "Jeeves and the Unbidden Guest" included in the 1925 collection Carry On, Jeeves, Bertie desires a "Broadway Special" hat while Jeeves prefers the "White House Wonder". Wodehouse updated these hat names from the original 1916 Saturday Evening Post version of the story, in which Bertie wants a hat called the "Country Gentleman" while Jeeves favours the "Longacre". Names of this kind were often used for items of clothing in Post advertisements in the 1910s.

== Publication history ==
1916 Saturday Evening Post illustration by Henry Raleigh

The story was illustrated by Henry Raleigh in the Saturday Evening Post and by Alfred Leete in the Strand.

The 1919 collection My Man Jeeves and later the 1925 collection Carry On, Jeeves included the story. The story was featured in the 1958 collection Selected Stories by P. G. Wodehouse.

== Adaptations ==
This story was adapted into the Jeeves and Wooster episode "Safety in New York", the first episode of the third series, which first aired in the UK on 29 March 1992. There are some differences in plot, including:

- In the episode, Bertie meets Lady Malvern and Motty on the ocean liner on the way to New York. Bertie has to look after Motty during the trip, and Motty is a nuisance to Bertie.
- In the episode, Jeeves states that Prohibition is in effect, but that, thanks to certain subterfuges, ardent spirits are more readily available than hitherto. Prohibition was not mentioned in the original story.
- Aunt Agatha thinks Bertie is in Scotland in the episode; Lady Malvern threatens to reveal Bertie's real location if he does not put up Motty.
- Instead of making a wager, Jeeves calls the police to arrest Motty for disorderly behavior, and Motty punches the officer who tries to arrest him.
- In the episode, Motty has notes to give his mother from his time in prison; it is implied that these notes were provided by Jeeves.
- In the episode, Bertie has a wide-brimmed white fedora (called the American or Al Capone hat) which Jeeves does not like. In the end, Jeeves gives it to the lift attendant, Mr. Coneybear. There is no mention of a Broadway Special, a White House Wonder, or a pink tie.
