= The Aunt and the Sluggard =

Short story by P. G. Wodehouse

- Short story by P. G. Wodehouse
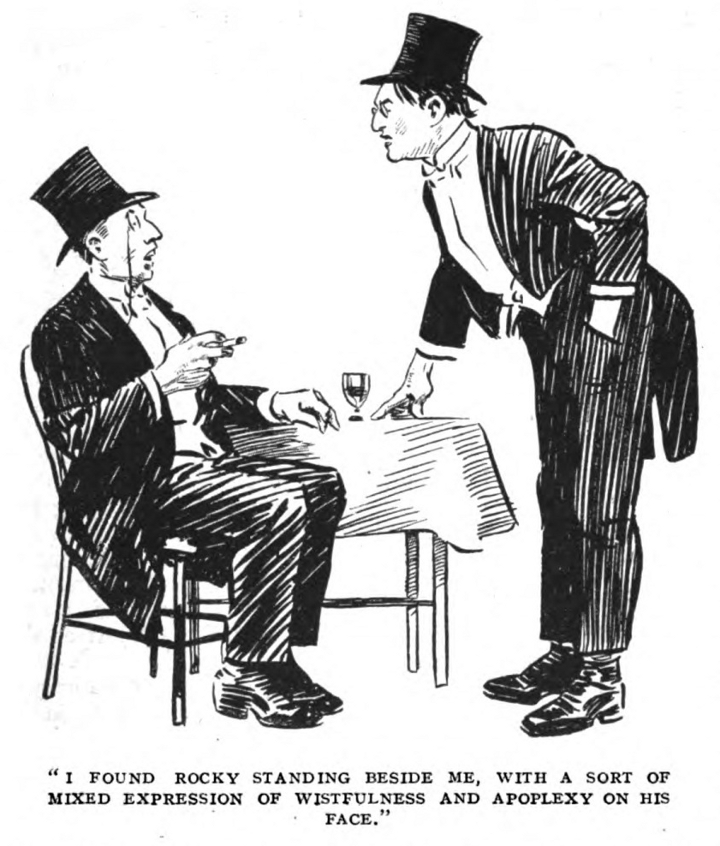
- 1916 Strand illustration by Alfred Leete
- Language: English
- Genre: Comedy

Publication
- Publisher: Saturday Evening Post (US); Strand (UK)
- Media type: Print (Magazine)
- Publication date: 22 April 1916 (US); August 1916 (UK)

Chronology
- Series: Jeeves
Jeeves and the Hard-boiled Egg	The Rummy Affair of Old Biffy

"The Aunt and the Sluggard" is a short story by P. G. Wodehouse, and features the young gentleman Bertie Wooster and his valet Jeeves. The story was published in the Saturday Evening Post in the United States in April 1916, and in The Strand Magazine in the United Kingdom in August 1916. The story was also included in the 1925 collection Carry On, Jeeves.

In the story, Bertie's friend Rocky, a reclusive poet who dislikes city life, needs help from Bertie and Jeeves when he is instructed by his aunt to go to exciting parties in New York and write letters to her about them.

== Plot ==
He was a poet. At least, he wrote poems when he did anything; but most of his time, as far as I could make out, he spent in a sort of trance. He told me once that he could sit on a fence, watching a worm and wondering what on earth it was up to, for hours at a stretch.

— Bertie describes Rocky, the sluggard

In New York, Bertie is surprised to be woken by his friend Rockmetteller "Rocky" Todd, who normally lives quietly in the country. Rocky received a letter from his aunt in Illinois and namesake, Miss Isabel Rockmetteller: she will pay Rocky an allowance, on the condition that he live in New York and write to her once a week about his experiences there so she can enjoy the city second-hand. She feels that she is not healthy enough to go to New York herself, though Rocky asserts that she is only being lazy.

Rocky hates the city, but is afraid of defying his aunt and being cut out of her will. Jeeves suggests getting someone else to spend time in New York and write notes for Rocky, who will then uses the notes to write letters to his aunt. Bertie proposes that Jeeves write the notes. Jeeves happily obliges. He writes notes about evenings he spends at clubs with celebrities, and Rocky writes exciting letters, which please his aunt.

Later, Rocky's Aunt Isabel abruptly shows up at Bertie's flat, which she thinks belongs to Rocky. Bertie says he is a friend of Rocky's, but she is clearly annoyed with Bertie's presence. Jeeves sends a telegram to bring Rocky to the flat. Meanwhile, Aunt Isabel plans to stay. She assumes Jeeves is Rocky's valet. Bertie goes to stay in a hotel, where he suffers without Jeeves, while Rocky endures going out to clubs with his aunt. He tells Bertie that the letters were so exciting that she believes she had some kind of faith cure, which allowed her to travel to New York. She ended Rocky's allowance since she is covering both their expenses.

Rocky's aunt starts to brood, and Rocky thinks she is wondering where Rocky's celebrity friends are. He asks Bertie to join them to distract her. Bertie does so, but Aunt Isabel still broods. The three of them return to the flat, where Aunt Isabel confesses that she now feels that the city is a vile place, after she heard the orator Jimmy Mundy speak against the evils of the city. She says that she heard him speak because Jeeves mistakenly brought her to the wrong venue, though she is glad he did. She implores Rocky to live in the country instead. Rocky enthusiastically agrees. The next day, Rocky and his aunt have left, and Bertie is back in his flat. He praises Jeeves. Jeeves advises Bertie to discontinue wearing his green tie and to wear the blue with the red domino pattern instead. Bertie agrees.

== Style ==
Wodehouse often has Bertie Wooster allude to a literary work he would have studied at school, though Bertie rarely quotes precisely, giving merely a sketchy version of the original work. An example of this in "The Aunt and the Sluggard" occurs when Bertie is at the hotel missing Jeeves: "It was like what somebody or other wrote about the touch of a vanished hand" (from Tennyson's "The May Queen"). Another example occurs when Aunt Isabel arrives unexpectedly at Bertie's apartment: "The situation floored me. I'm not denying it. Hamlet must have felt much as I did when his father's ghost bobbed up in the fairway".

The contrast in Jeeves's and Bertie's diction leads to what Wodehouse scholar Kristin Thompson terms the "translation device". Jeeves often says something that Bertie repeats in less formal language, either to make sure he understands or to translate for someone else. This device is used for comic effect in "The Aunt and the Sluggard", when Jeeves provides a long, formal, sophisticated description of his plan for Rocky to have someone else write letters about New York to his aunt. When Rocky is confused by Jeeves's complex speech, Bertie translates Jeeves's idea for Rocky in much fewer, simpler words. The humour in these situations arises from the fact that Bertie's version is much shorter than Jeeves's.

== Background ==
The title is a pun on Book of Proverbs 6:6 "Go to the ant, thou sluggard; consider her ways and be wise."

The fictional character Jimmy Mundy is based on evangelical preacher Billy Sunday.

In the story, Jeeves visits two nightclubs, "Frolics on the Roof" and the "Midnight Revels". Both of these names were derived from the popular "Midnight Frolics" at the New Amsterdam's Roof Garden theatre.

== Publication history ==
1916 Saturday Evening Post illustration by Tony Sarg

Tony Sarg provided illustrations for the story in the Saturday Evening Post. Alfred Leete illustrated the story in the Strand.

The story was featured in the 1919 collection My Man Jeeves and in the 1925 collection Carry On, Jeeves. There are some minor differences between the two book versions of the story. For example, in the My Man Jeeves version, one of the phrases in the poem by Rocky Todd which Bertie quotes is "With every muscle". This phrase is changed to "With every fibre" in the Carry On, Jeeves version of the story.

The 1958 collection Selected Stories by P. G. Wodehouse, published by The Modern Library, and the 1985 collection P. G. Wodehouse Short Stories, published by The Folio Society and illustrated by George Adamson, included the story.

"The Aunt and the Sluggard" was collected in the 1958 anthology The Saturday Evening Post Carnival of Humor, published by Prentice-Hall.

== Adaptations ==
An episode of The World of Wooster adapted the story. The episode, titled "Jeeves, the Aunt and the Sluggard", was the second episode of the first series. It was originally broadcast in the UK on 6 June 1965.

This story was adapted into the Jeeves and Wooster episode "The Full House", the second episode of the third series, which first aired in the UK on 5 April 1992. There are some differences in plot, including:

- In the original story, Rocky went to Bertie's flat to ask for help; in the episode, he asks via cable for Bertie to visit him. Bertie and Jeeves go to Rocky's cottage.
- In the original story, Rocky's poetry is consciously hypocritical - he hopes not to work at all when he receives his aunt's inheritance, save for an occasional poem encouraging the same readers of his seize-the-day verses to put up their feet and relax. The Rocky of the show, however, seems to be genuinely motivated to write his gung-ho poetry.
- In the original story, Jeeves simply winces when Rocky, distressed at the thought of dressing for dinner in New York, says he generally only wears pyjamas and a sweater; Jeeves is more obviously affected in the episode.
- In the episode, Bertie first suggests that his friend Bicky could write the notes. When Bicky is too busy, Bertie suggests Jeeves.
