= Jeeves and the Impending Doom =

Short story by P. G. Wodehouse

- Short story by P. G. Wodehouse
- Country: United Kingdom
- Language: English
- Genre: Comedy

Publication
- Publisher: The Strand Magazine (UK); Liberty (US)
- Media type: Print (Magazine)
- Publication date: December 1926 (UK); January 1927 (US)

Chronology
- Series: Jeeves
| Bertie Changes His Mind | The Inferiority Complex of Old Sippy |

"Jeeves and the Impending Doom" is a short story by P. G. Wodehouse, and features the young gentleman Bertie Wooster and his valet Jeeves. The story was published in The Strand Magazine in the United Kingdom in December 1926, and in Liberty in the United States in January 1927. The story was also included as the first story in the 1930 collection Very Good, Jeeves.

In the story, Bertie's Aunt Agatha hires Bertie's friend Bingo Little to tutor her son Thomas. Thomas makes trouble for a guest of Aunt Agatha's, A. B. Filmer, and Bertie and Jeeves have to help Filmer to keep Bingo from losing his job.

== Plot ==
Bertie is about to reluctantly visit his unfriendly Aunt Agatha's house at Woollam Chersey, in Herts. Before he leaves, he receives an unsigned telegram that says it is vital for him to meet perfect strangers at Woollam Chersey. Neither Bertie nor Jeeves understand the telegram. At Woollam Chersey, Aunt Agatha tells Bertie that he must behave himself and make a good impression on her guest, the Right Honourable A. B. Filmer, the Cabinet Minister. Bertie is not pleased, but then sees his friend Bingo Little and greets him cheerfully. However, Bingo shushes him, and asks if Bertie got his telegram. Bingo is tutoring young Thomas "Thos" Gregson, Aunt Agatha's son, and wants Bertie to treat him as a perfect stranger, or else Aunt Agatha will learn he is Bertie's friend, and fire him. When Bertie asks why Bingo is not with his wife in America on her lecture tour, Bingo does not answer.

Bertie struggles to endure the company of the tedious Mr. Filmer. Later, Bingo asks Bertie and Jeeves for help. Bingo confesses that his wife left him two hundred pounds and asked him to stay behind to look after their Pekingese dog, but he lost the money on a horse race. Bingo boarded the dog and got a tutoring job. He fears Aunt Agatha will fire him for not supervising Thomas when Thomas inevitably makes trouble for Filmer. Bertie can only advise Bingo to watch Thomas carefully. Jeeves will consider the matter. Shortly afterward, Bertie and Bingo play in a local tennis tournament. It rains, and everyone goes inside. Filmer is not present, and Bertie senses an impending doom. Aunt Agatha tells Bertie to find Filmer and take a raincoat to him. In the hall, Bertie runs into Jeeves, who learned from Thomas that Filmer had rowed to the island in the nearby lake. Thomas rowed after him and set Filmer's boat adrift, marooning Filmer. Jeeves agrees to follow Bertie.

Well, I could have told that swan it was no use. As swans go, he may have been well up in the ranks of the intelligentsia; but, when it came to pitting his brains against Jeeves, he was simply wasting his time. He might just as well have gone home at once.

— The swan is no match for Jeeves

It rains heavily as Bertie and Jeeves approach the island by boat. Bertie rows, while Jeeves steers with the tiller. They see Filmer on the roof of a building called the Octagon. Bertie tells Jeeves to wait in the boat. As he greets Filmer, Bertie is targeted by a fierce wild swan. Fleeing to the roof, Bertie drops Filmer's raincoat. Bertie chats with the annoyed Filmer until Bertie remembers Jeeves. He calls for Jeeves, who comes. Jeeves uses the discarded raincoat to cover the swan's head, and then heaves the swan off its feet with a boathook. Before the swan can unscramble itself, Bertie and Filmer escape. Filmer is sure that Thomas had set his boat drift, and Bertie is concerned for Bingo.

At the house, after Bertie takes a bath, he sees Jeeves, who says he has attended to the matter. To protect Bingo, Jeeves convinced Filmer that it was Bertie who set his boat adrift. At first Bertie is insulted, but changes his mind when Jeeves says that Aunt Agatha intended to make Bertie become Filmer's secretary. Jeeves suggests that Bertie avoid his aunt by climbing down a waterpipe outside a window. Jeeves will have a car waiting nearby. Bertie looks at Jeeves reverently, and follows his plan.

== Style ==
Wodehouse occasionally uses a transferred epithet, especially an adjective modifying a noun rather than the corresponding adverb modifying the verb of the sentence. This occurs with the word "moody" in the following quote from the story: "He uncovered the fragrant eggs and I pronged a moody forkful."

According to Wodehouse scholar Kristin Thompson, when Jeeves does or says something unusual and it is not explained later, it may be a cue to the reader that he has manipulated events in ways that Bertie, the narrator, is not aware of. Thompson suggests that Jeeves may have used his "informal conversation" with Thomas to encourage him to maroon Filmer on the island, in order to ultimately discredit Bertie with Filmer so Bertie would not become Filmer's secretary. Later, when telling Bertie about Thomas's plan to maroon Filmer, Jeeves seems unconcerned and distracts Bertie by calling his attention to his badly knotted tie (not "the perfect butterfly effect").

Whether or not Jeeves manipulated events to this extent, he does make a remark at the end which Bertie fails to understand but can be understood by the reader. He explains to Bertie why he told Filmer that Bertie had marooned him on the island: "I had scarcely left you when the solution of the affair presented itself to me. It was a remark of Mr Filmer's that gave me the idea." This is a subtle reference to what Filmer said when he assumed Thomas was the one who marooned him: "He has a grudge against me. And it is the sort of thing only a boy, or one who is practically an imbecile, would have thought of doing." The phrase "practically an imbecile" presumably gave Jeeves the idea to blame his employer.

== Publication history ==
"Jeeves and the Impending Doom" was illustrated by Charles Crombie in the Strand and by Wallace Morgan in Liberty.

The American edition of a collection of Wodehouse stories, The Weekend-End Wodehouse, published in 1939 by Doubleday, included the story. The story appeared in Selected Stories by P. G. Wodehouse, a 1958 collection of Wodehouse stories published by The Modern Library, and in The Most of Wodehouse, a 1960 collection of Wodehouse stories published by Simon and Schuster. It was also featured in the 1983 collection P. G. Wodehouse Short Stories, which was illustrated by George Adamson and published by The Folio Society. The collection A Wodehouse Bestiary, a 1985 omnibus of Wodehouse stories involving animals, featured "Jeeves and the Impending Doom".

The story was included in the 1932 anthology London Omnibus published by Doubleday, and in the 1940 anthology Modern Humour published by J. M. Dent & Sons.

== Adaptations ==
An episode of The World of Wooster adapted the story. The episode, titled "Jeeves and the Impending Doom", was the fourth episode of the third series. It was originally broadcast in the UK on 27 October 1967.

This story was not adapted into any Jeeves and Wooster episode.
