= Without the Option =

- Short story by P. G. Wodehouse
- Country: United Kingdom
- Language: English
- Genre: Comedy

Publication
- Publisher: Saturday Evening Post (US); The Strand Magazine (UK)
- Media type: Print (Magazine)
- Publication date: June 1925 (US); July 1925 (UK)

Chronology
- Series: Jeeves
The Rummy Affair of Old Biffy	Fixing it for Freddie

"Without the Option" is a short story by P. G. Wodehouse, and features the young gentleman Bertie Wooster and his valet Jeeves. The story was published in the Saturday Evening Post in the United States in June 1925, and in The Strand Magazine in the United Kingdom in July 1925. The story was also included in the 1925 collection Carry On, Jeeves.

In the story, Bertie must take the place of his friend Oliver "Sippy" Sipperley at the country house of the unfriendly Pringle family after he inadvertently gets Sippy arrested.

== Plot ==
In court, Bertie is ordered to pay a fine of five pounds; Bertie does not have money on him, so he asks Jeeves to pay the fine. Sippy, who assaulted the police, is ordered to serve a sentence of thirty days without the option of a fine.

Bertie recounts how this happened. Though he normally drinks in moderation, Bertie lets himself go on Boat Race night; while celebrating, he saw his friend Oliver "Sippy" Sipperley. Sippy is an author, but relies on an allowance from his Aunt Vera. He was dejected because he has to spend three weeks with his aunt's unpleasant friends, the Pringle family. To improve his morale, Bertie suggested Sippy steal a policeman's helmet. Sippy took this advice, and consequently, both Sippy and Bertie were arrested. Guilt-ridden, Bertie visits Sippy in prison. Sippy is worried because he will not be able to visit the Pringles. Bertie returns home and poses this problem to Jeeves. Later, Jeeves suggests that Bertie visit the Pringles, pretending to be Sippy. Bertie is reluctant, but goes after Jeeves tells him that his Aunt Agatha wants to confront Bertie about his arrest.

For the next few days all was peace. I saw comparatively little of Heloise. I found the strategic value of that water-pipe outside my window beyond praise. I seldom left the house now by any other route.

— Bertie avoids Heloise

Bertie stays with the Pringles. They are all unfriendly. The daughter, Heloise, greatly resembles Honoria Glossop; Bertie learns from Jeeves that she is Honoria's cousin. Heloise flirts with Bertie, and he narrowly escapes her. Thereafter, he uses the water pipe outside his window to move around, to avoid Heloise. He does well, until Sir Roderick Glossop visits and recognizes Bertie. Bertie confesses that he is not Sippy. Jeeves advises that they go see Sippy's aunt and tell her what has happened before she hears it from the Pringles.

After a long drive, they reach Miss Sipperley. Bertie explains to her that he told Sippy to steal a policeman's helmet. Surprisingly, Miss Sipperley is pleased. Later, Jeeves tells Bertie that Miss Sipperley is prejudiced against police because the local constable has been bothering her. Jeeves gave five pounds to this constable, who is actually his cousin Egbert. Bertie gladly gives Jeeves ten pounds.

== Publication history ==
The story was illustrated by George Wright in the Saturday Evening Post, and by A. Wallis Mills in the Strand.

The 1981 collection Wodehouse on Crime, which featured crime-related Wodehouse stories, included "Without the Option".

== Adaptations ==
The story was adapted for an episode of The World of Wooster. The episode, titled "Jeeves and the Stand-in for Sippy", was the second episode of the third series. It was originally broadcast in the UK on 13 October 1967.

This story was not adapted for any Jeeves and Wooster episode. However elements of the plot, namely Bertie being fined 5 pounds, and relating the story of stealing a policeman's hat, are utilised in the programme's first episode, Jeeves Takes Charge. The theme of Bertie descending on some host impersonating someone else recurs in The Mating Season, which was adapted in Series 3, Episode 4 of Jeeves and Wooster.
