= Jeeves Takes Charge =

Short story by P. G. Wodehouse

- Short story by P. G. Wodehouse
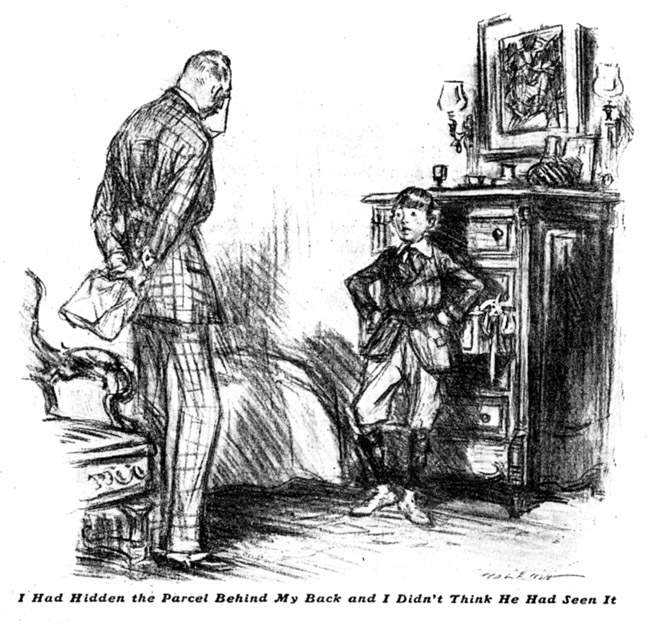
- 1916 Saturday Evening Post illustration by Henry Raleigh
- Country: United Kingdom
- Language: English
- Genre: Comedy

Publication
- Publisher: Saturday Evening Post (US); The Strand Magazine (UK)
- Media type: Print (Magazine)
- Publication date: November 1916 (US); April 1923 (UK)

Chronology
- Series: Jeeves
Bingo and the Little Woman	The Artistic Career of Corky

"Jeeves Takes Charge" is a short story by P. G. Wodehouse, and features the young gentleman Bertie Wooster and his valet Jeeves. The story was published in the Saturday Evening Post in the United States in November 1916, and in The Strand Magazine in the United Kingdom in April 1923. The story was also included in the 1925 collection Carry On, Jeeves.

Bertie meets Jeeves for the first time in this story. Florence Craye, Bertie's fiancée, wants him to destroy his uncle's scandalous memoirs.

== Plot ==
24-year-old Bertie Wooster returns to London from Easeby, his Uncle Willoughby's home, after firing his valet for stealing. An agency sends him Jeeves, who prepares a drink that cures both Bertie's hangover and his fatigue after trying to read a difficult book titled "Types of Ethical Theory", which his fiancée, Lady Florence Craye, expects him to read. Impressed, Bertie hires Jeeves. Bertie receives a telegram from Florence, who is at Easeby, telling him to return at once. Jeeves wants Bertie to wear a simple brown or blue suit with a hint of quiet twill, but Bertie wears his check suit instead.

For a moment I felt as if somebody had touched off a bomb inside the old bean and was strolling down my throat with a lighted torch, and then everything seemed suddenly to get all right. The sun shone in through the window; birds twittered in the tree-tops; and, generally speaking, hope dawned once more.

— Bertie drinks Jeeves's hangover cure

At Easeby, Florence tells Bertie that his uncle is writing a memoir called "Recollections of a Long Life". Many of the stories feature Florence's father, Lord Worplesdon. Florence is appalled by the rowdy stories. She tells Bertie to destroy the manuscript. Bertie does not want to upset his uncle, upon whom he is financially dependent, but Florence is adamant. Bertie steals the parcel, and after running into Florence's young brother Edwin, Bertie locks it in a drawer in his room.

Uncle Willoughby tells Bertie that his publishers have not received his manuscript. He fears it has been stolen. Feeling guilty, Bertie tries to take a walk, but overhears Edwin telling Willoughby that he saw Bertie hiding a parcel. Bertie rushes back to his room to move the parcel but finds he has misplaced the key to the locked drawer. Willoughby arrives, and searches. When he reaches the locked drawer, Jeeves appears and provides the key. At first Bertie is angry with Jeeves, but the drawer is empty. After Willoughby leaves, Bertie thanks Jeeves, who moved the parcel.

Later, Willoughby reports that his publishers received his manuscript. Florence is furious with Bertie and ends their engagement. Distressed, Bertie questions Jeeves, who admits sending the parcel to the publishers. He says Florence overestimated the offensiveness of Sir Willoughby's "Recollections". When Jeeves shows no sympathy about the broken engagement, Bertie fires him. Jeeves opines that Bertie would not have been happy with Florence. After sleeping on it, Bertie realizes that Jeeves is right. He rehires Jeeves and allows Jeeves to dispose of the check suit. Jeeves thanks him and says he has already given the suit away to the under-gardener.

== Style ==
Characters in Wodehouse's stories rarely tell conventional jokes, and humour is instead created indirectly through a number of stylistic devices. Bertie Wooster seldom tells a traditional joke, for example, but often uses puns, such as when he describes how his valet Meadowes stole his socks: "I was reluctantly compelled to hand the misguided blighter the mitten", and, "directly I found that he was a sock-sneaker I gave him the boot".

In Wodehouse's stories, information is frequently repeated in two or more ways through the use of alternative words, placing concentration on humorous language rather than on a steady flow of new narrative information. For instance, pairs of synonymous words are often used in Bertie's narration and dialogue, as in the following quote from this story: "This infernal kid must somehow be turned out eftsoons or right speedily".

== Publication history ==
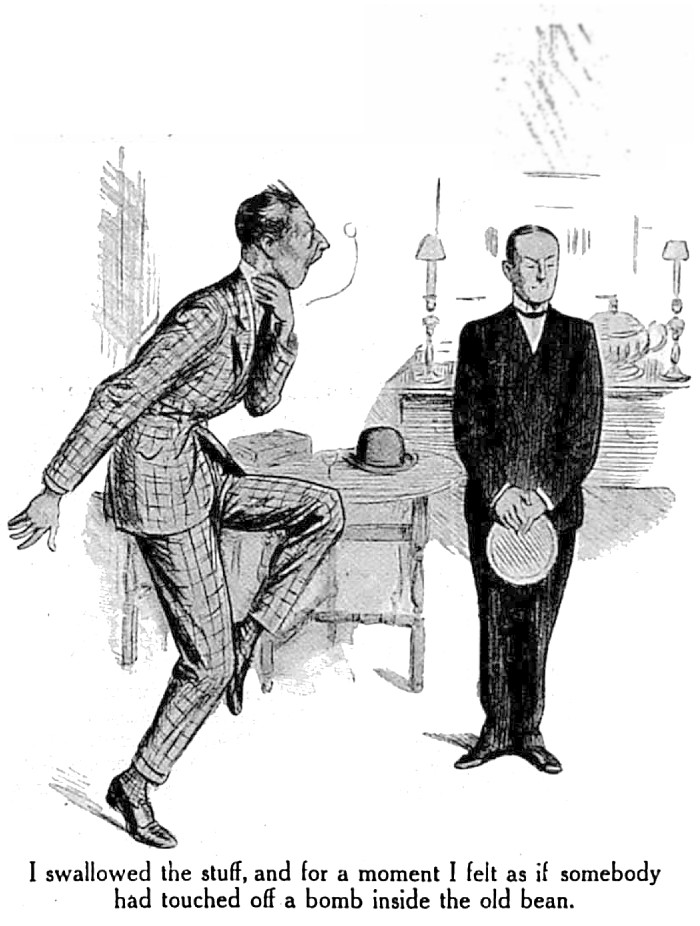
1923 Strand illustration by A. Wallis Mills

Henry Raleigh provided illustrations for the 1916 publication of the story in the Saturday Evening Post. The story was illustrated by A. Wallis Mills in the Strand. In 1980, the story was reprinted in the Saturday Evening Post with illustrations by Phil Smith.

The story was included in the American edition of the 1939 Wodehouse collection The Week-End Wodehouse, and in the 1958 collection of Wodehouse stories, Selected Stories by P. G. Wodehouse.

== Adaptations ==
The first part of the story, in which Bertie hires Jeeves, was adapted into the TV drama Jeeves and Wooster episode "Jeeves' Arrival", the first episode of the first series, which first aired in the UK on 22 April 1990. The rest of the story, concerning Florence and scandalous memoirs, was adapted into "Sir Watkyn Bassett's Memoirs", the fifth episode of the fourth series, which first aired in the UK on 26 April 1992. There are some differences in plot, including:

- In "Jeeves' Arrival", Jeeves refuses to tell Bertie the ingredients of his preparation, though he names three ingredients in the original story.
- Florence is Sir Watkyn Bassett's niece and Madeline Bassett's cousin in the episode, though this was never stated in the original canon.
- The memoirs belong to Sir Watkyn Bassett; Bertie's Uncle Willoughby does not appear in the episode. In addition to Florence, Madeline also tells Bertie to steal the manuscript.
- Bertie finds Spode trying to steal the manuscript, which contains stories about him that could ruin his political career. At Bassett's behest, Constable Oates uses dynamite to open the safe, and Bassett removes the manuscript and packages it. Then Bertie steals the parcel.
- Edwin is not in the episode; it is Gussie Fink-Nottle who says that he saw Bertie with a parcel.
- Jeeves does not wait until he has been fired to voice his opinion about Florence; before Bertie can fire Jeeves, Bertie overhears Florence being hard on some servants, and decides immediately that Jeeves was right about her. Only afterward does Jeeves talk about how Florence overestimated the dangers of the manuscript as he and Bertie walk off.

The original one-man theatre production of Jeeves Takes Charge with Edward Duke was co-devised by James and Edward Duke with Hugh Wooldridge in 1980. Wooldridge also directed and lit the world premiere production at the Lyric Theatre, Hammersmith. A brand new production of Jeeves Takes Charge with Sam Harrison, also directed by Wooldridge, opens at the Theatre Royal Bath, in December 2024.
