= Honoria Glossop Turns Up =

- Jeeves and Wooster episode
- Episode no.: Season 4 Episode 3
- Directed by: Ferdinand Fairfax
- Original air date: 30 May 1993

Episode chronology
← Previous "Return to New York"	Next → "The Delayed Arrival"

"Honoria Glossop Turns Up" is the third episode of the fourth series of the 1990s British comedy television series Jeeves and Wooster. It is also called "Bridegroom Wanted". It first aired in the UK on 30 May 1993 on ITV.

In the US, it was aired as the second episode of the third series of Jeeves and Wooster on Masterpiece Theatre, on 17 October 1993. "Wooster with a Wife" aired as the third episode of the fourth series instead.

== Background ==
Adapted from "Jeeves and the Greasy Bird" (collected in Plum Pie) and "Bingo and the Little Woman" (collected in The Inimitable Jeeves), all written by P. G. Wodehouse. The title was written for television by Clive Exton.

== Cast ==
- Bertie Wooster – Hugh Laurie
- Jeeves – Stephen Fry
- Bingo Little – Pip Torrens
- Sir Roderick Glossop – Philip Locke
- Honoria Glossop – Liz Kettle
- Rosie M. Banks – Anastasia Hille
- Lord Bittlesham – Geoffrey Toone
- Jas Waterbury – David Healy
- Liftman Coneybear – Joseph Mydell

== Plot ==
Bingo Little wants to marry a waitress so needs his uncle's blessing. Bertie is pushed into helping him by pretending to be author Rosie M. Banks again. Little's uncle, Lord Bittlesham, is under Sir Roderick Glossop who has moved to America. Trying to sort things out, Bertie manages to get Blair Eggleston to break off his engagement with Honoria Glossop who now wants to marry Bertie. Meanwhile Bingo marries the waitress, who turns out to be the real Rosie M. Banks, so she and Lord Bittlesham are also after Bertie who decides the best thing is to take the next ship to London. But so do all the others and, confronted by all of them on board, he and Jeeves jump ship. Eight and a half months later, they turn up back in England, with long beards and looking like they have spent much of that time in an open boat and in savage lands.

== See also ==
- List of Jeeves and Wooster characters
