= Safety in New York =

- Jeeves and Wooster episode
- Episode no.: Season 3 Episode 1
- Directed by: Ferdinand Fairfax
- Original air date: 29 March 1992

Episode chronology
← Previous "Wooster with a Wife"	Next → "The Full House"

"Safety in New York" is the first episode of the third series of the 1990s British comedy television series Jeeves and Wooster. It is also called "Bertie Sets Sail". It first aired in the UK on 29 March 1992 on ITV.

In the US, "Safety in New York" was one of five episodes that were not aired as part of the original broadcast of Jeeves and Wooster on Masterpiece Theatre, though all episodes were made available on US home video releases. The episode "Return to New York" was aired as the first episode of the third series instead.

== Background ==
Adapted from "Jeeves and the Unbidden Guest" (collected in Carry On, Jeeves).

== Cast ==
- Jeeves – Stephen Fry
- Bertie Wooster – Hugh Laurie
- Tuppy Glossop – Robert Daws
- Rocky Todd – John Fitzgerald-Jay
- Wilmot "Motty", Lord Pershore – Ronan Vibert
- Lady Malvern – Moyra Fraser
- J. Washburn Stoker – Don Fellows
- Pauline Stoker – Kim Huffman
- Liftman, Mr Coneybear – Ricco Ross
- Diner – Gordon Sterne
- Taxi Driver – Morgan Deare

== Plot ==
Bertie escapes Aunt Agatha's plot to get him married to Honoria Glossop by taking a ship to New York, accompanied by Jeeves. On board he meets Tuppy Glossop who is going to buy a car there. Tuppy's uncle is Bertie's nemesis (and later good friend) Sir Roderick Glossop and his cousin is Bertie's ex-fiancée Honoria Glossop. Meanwhile, Tuppy has fallen in love with the daughter of an American automobile manufacturer. He wants to import American cars to Britain and promises to buy 48 cars, but he barely has enough money for one American car.

Bertie is then lumbered with Wilmot "Motty", Lord Pershore, who is the son of Aunt Agatha's friend Lady Malvern.

Once in America, she leaves for a tour of prisons for an upcoming book. She has left strict instructions as to how to look after the very delicate Wilmot, who cannot travel with his mother, as he gets ill when travelling by train.

But once out of his mother's eye, he turns from a withdrawn little man into someone who's out clubbing and getting drunk every night and yielding to the temptations of New York in a big way. Bertie escapes to the woods to stay with poet friend Mr. Todd while Jeeves sorts things out, calling a policeman. Wilmot assaults the policeman while drunk and is sent to prison. But his mother sees Wilmot as a prisoner on her tour of prisons. Wilmot does not want her to find out what he has done. He turns to Jeeves for help.

== See also ==
- List of Jeeves and Wooster characters
