= Bingo and the Little Woman =

- Short story by P. G. Wodehouse
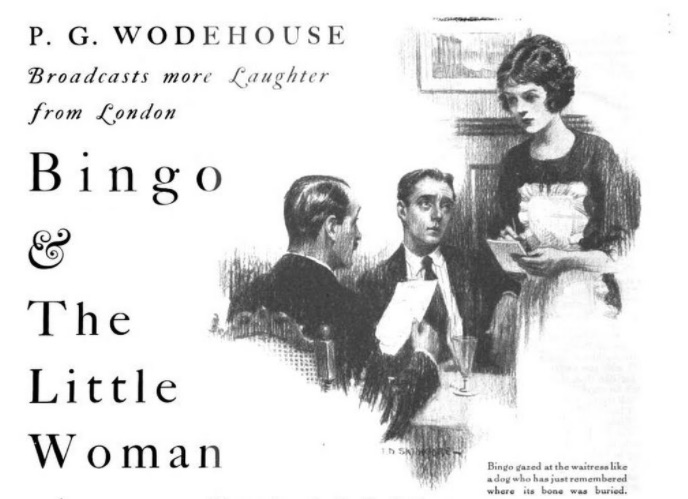
- Bertie, Bingo, and the waitress, 1922 title illustration by T. D. Skidmore for Cosmopolitan
- Illustrator: A. Wallis Mills
- Country: United Kingdom
- Language: English
- Genre: Comedy

Publication
- Publisher: The Strand Magazine (UK); Cosmopolitan (US)
- Media type: Print (Magazine)
- Publication date: November 1922 (UK); December 1922 (US)

Chronology
- Series: Jeeves
The Delayed Exit of Claude and Eustace	Jeeves Takes Charge

"Bingo and the Little Woman" is a short story by P. G. Wodehouse, and features the young gentleman Bertie Wooster and his valet Jeeves. The story was published in The Strand Magazine in London in November 1922, and then in Cosmopolitan in New York in December 1922. The story was also included in the collection The Inimitable Jeeves as two separate stories, "Bingo and the Little Woman" and "All's Well".

In the story, Bingo Little, who wishes to marry a waitress and wants his uncle's approval, asks Bertie to once again pretend to be the romance novelist Rosie M. Banks.

== Plot ==
=== Bingo and the Little Woman ===
Bertie and his friend Bingo Little dine at the Senior Liberal Club, where Bingo falls in love with their waitress. She returns his feelings. Bingo asks Bertie to persuade Bingo's uncle, Lord Bittlesham, to restore his allowance by once more pretending to be the romance novelist Rosie M. Banks, whom Lord Bittlesham admires. Bertie is reluctant, but Bingo reminds him they were at school together. Bingo tells Bertie to send Bittlesham an autographed copy of Rosie M. Banks's most recent novel, The Woman Who Braved All.

Having greatly enjoyed the book, Lord Bittlesham listens to Bertie and agrees to restore Bingo's allowance. However, he does not approve of Bingo's engagement.

"Oh, I say, Bertie!" he said suddenly, dropping a vase which he had picked off the mantelpiece and was fiddling with. "I know what it was I wanted to tell you. I'm married."

— Bingo is married

Bertie tells this to Bingo, who is happy about his allowance but disappointed not to have his uncle's approval. Bingo is gone for three days, and when he reappears, he looks dazed and rambles about random topics. At last, he tells Bertie the big news: he is married.

=== All's Well ===
Bertie is stunned that Bingo has got married. Bingo persuade Bertie to talk to Lord Bittlesham again to break the news. Bertie talks to Bittlesham, and at first Bittlesham is angry that Bingo has married without his approval. However Bertie quotes from The Woman Who Braved All and persuades him to support the marriage. As he leaves, Bertie tells Bingo and his wife, who are waiting outside the room, that they can talk to Lord Bittlesham now.

Bingo later comes to Bertie in distress and says that his wife, spotting the same book Bertie quoted from, told Lord Bittlesham that she was Rosie M. Banks. She had been working as a waitress to gather material for a book and had not told Bingo because she was touched that Bingo loved her regardless. At first Lord Bittlesham calls her an imposter, but she proves her claim. Bittlesham is angry with Bertie and Bingo for fooling him. Rosie is also upset with Bertie for pretending to be her. Jeeves suggests that Bertie go hunting in Norfolk while Jeeves stays behind to sort things out.

Bertie does not enjoy himself in Norfolk and returns to London. He goes directly to Bingo's place to find out what has happened and meets Lord Bittlesham there. Bertie fears a scene but Bittlesham acts awkwardly. Afterwards Bertie sees Bingo, who says that his uncle and Rosie get along very well now. On Jeeves's advice Bingo told his uncle that Bertie is mentally unsound and everyone was fooled by Bertie's delusion. Bingo got the nerve specialist Sir Roderick Glossop, who has had several bizarre run-ins with Bertie, to verify this claim.

Indignant to be made out to be mentally unsound, Bertie intends to fire Jeeves. He cannot bring himself to, however, when he considers how right it feels to see Jeeves in the flat. Instead he simply thanks Jeeves.

== Publication history ==
Bertie and Lord Bittlesham, illustration by A. Wallis Mills in The Strand Magazine, 1922

The story was illustrated by A. Wallis Mills in the Strand, and by T. D. Skidmore in Cosmopolitan.

== Adaptations ==
=== Television ===
This story was adapted in the Jeeves and Wooster episode "Honoria Glossop Turns Up", the third episode of the fourth series, which first aired in the UK on 30 May 1993. There are some differences in plot, including:

- The episode takes place in New York rather than London.
- In the episode, Lord Bittlesham is being treated by Sir Roderick Glossop.
- In the episode, Jeeves does not suggest the plan that they say Bertie is mentally unsound; Instead, Bertie and Jeeves escape from the conflict by jumping off an ocean liner.

=== Radio ===
This story, along with the rest of The Inimitable Jeeves, was adapted into a radio drama in 1973 as part of the series What Ho! Jeeves starring Michael Hordern as Jeeves and Richard Briers as Bertie Wooster.

== Sources ==
- Cawthorne, Nigel (2013). A Brief Guide to Jeeves and Wooster. London: Constable & Robinson. ISBN 978-1-78033-824-8.
- McIlvaine, Eileen; Sherby, Louise S.; Heineman, James H. (1990). P. G. Wodehouse: A Comprehensive Bibliography and Checklist. New York: James H. Heineman Inc. ISBN 978-0-87008-125-5.
- Wodehouse, P. G. (2008) [1923]. The Inimitable Jeeves (Reprinted ed.). London: Arrow Books. ISBN 978-0099513681.
