= The Mating Season =

The mating season is the seasonal period during which members of a certain species of animal tend to mate.

The Mating Season or Mating Season, may refer to:

- The Mating Season (novel), a Jeeves and Wooster novel by P. G. Wodehouse
- The Mating Season (play), a 1969 comedy by Sam Cree whose lead actor in a 1976 revival, Sid James, died on stage
- The Mating Season (film), a 1951 American comedy based on the play Maggie by Caesar Dunn
- The Mating Season (1966 film), a Hong Kong Shaw Brothers film
- The Mating Season (1976 film), a TV comedy film starring Bruce Forsyth broadcast by ITV Thames
- The Mating Season (1980 film), a TV comedy film starring Lucie Arnaz filmed at The Mountain Camp & Conference Center, Highlands, NC
- "The Mating Season" (episode), a 1995 episode of the American TV sitcom The Crew
- "The Mating Season" (serial), a 1975 radio drama serial of What Ho! Jeeves based on the P.G. Wodehouse story
- Mating Season, an adult-oriented animated sitcom from Nick Kroll, Andrew Goldberg, Mark Levin, and Jennifer Flackett
- "Mating Season", a TV programming block on Channel 4 that included the romantic drama TV show Dates (TV series)

== See also ==
- "Dating Season", an episode of Amphibia
