= Comrade Bingo =

- Short story by P. G. Wodehouse
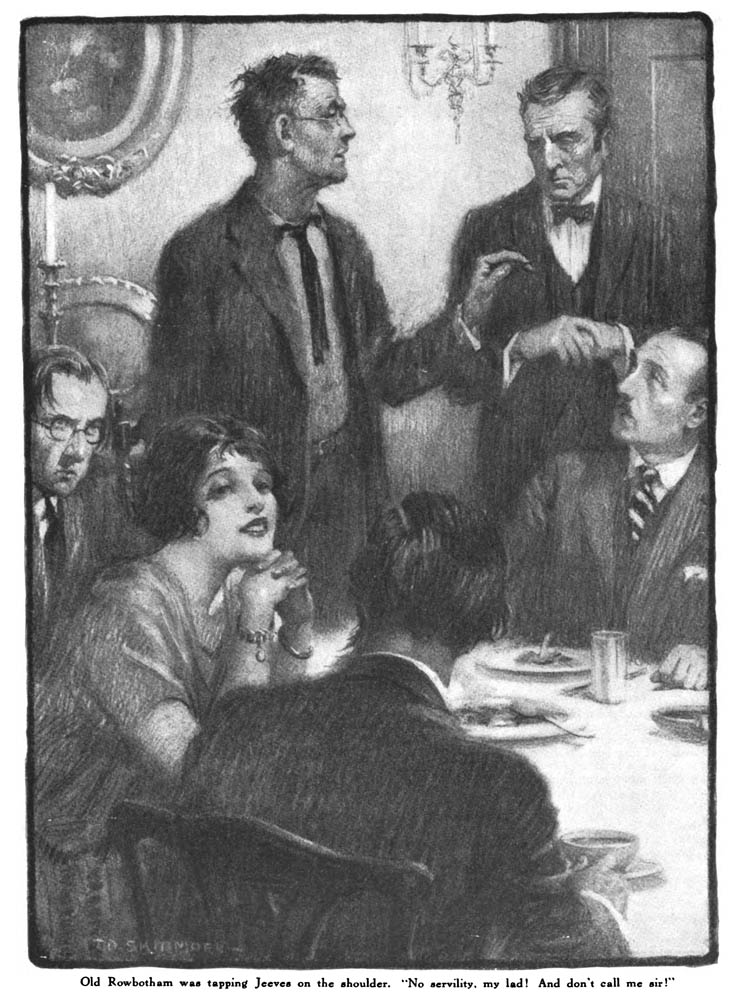
- 1922 Cosmopolitan illustration by T. D. Skidmore
- Illustrator: A. Wallis Mills
- Country: United Kingdom
- Language: English
- Genre: Comedy

Publication
- Publisher: The Strand Magazine (UK); Cosmopolitan (US)
- Media type: Print (Magazine)
- Publication date: May 1922

Chronology
- Series: Jeeves
Jeeves and the Chump Cyril	The Great Sermon Handicap

"Comrade Bingo" is a short story by P. G. Wodehouse, and features the young gentleman Bertie Wooster and his valet Jeeves. The story was published in The Strand Magazine in London in May 1922, and in Cosmopolitan in New York that same month. The story was also included in the 1923 collection The Inimitable Jeeves as two separate chapters, "Comrade Bingo" and "Bingo Has a Bad Goodwood".

In the story, Bertie's friend Bingo Little falls in love with a revolutionary, Charlotte Rowbotham, and joins her communist group to win her affection.

== Plot ==
=== Comrade Bingo ===
Various groups make speeches in Hyde Park, including a communist group called "Heralds of the Red Dawn". One of them, a bearded man, denounces the Idle Rich to a crowd. Bingo Little's uncle, recently titled Lord Bittlesham, approaches Bertie. He owns Ocean Breeze, a horse on which Bertie has bet money for the Goodwood Cup. Presently, the bearded man loudly insults them.

Bertie later meets Bingo at a club. Bingo is in love with Charlotte Corday Rowbotham, a member of the Red Dawn. To impress Charlotte, Bingo joined the Red Dawn. He wore a beard to not be recognized, and was the man in Hyde Park. He wants to win enough money on Ocean Breeze to marry Charlotte, but has no capital to bet with. He invites himself to Bertie's flat the next day, and will bring Charlotte, as well as her father Rowbotham and Comrade Butt, both members of the Red Dawn.

Old Rowbotham had lowered his cup and was eyeing us sternly. He tapped Jeeves on the shoulder. "No servility, my lad; no servility!"
"I beg your pardon, sir?"
"Don't call me 'sir'. Call me Comrade. Do you know what you are, my lad? You're an obsolete relic of an exploded feudal system."
"Very good, sir."

— Rowbotham disapproves of Jeeves

The next day, they arrive at Bertie's home and dine. Rowbotham advises Bertie to join their group. He disapproves of Jeeves being a servant. Bingo and Charlotte flirt, and Comrade Butt, a rival for Charlotte's affections, is jealous. Bertie dislikes Charlotte.

=== Bingo Has a Bad Goodwood ===
Bertie meets Bingo and Lord Bittlesham in front of a club. Bittlesham is nervous. He has received a threatening letter from the bearded man. After Bittlesham leaves, Bingo shows Bertie that his uncle paid him fifty pounds to investigate the threat. Bingo will bet the money on Ocean Breeze.

Bingo and Charlotte spend time together. Jeeves meets with Comrade Butt one evening, and reports that Butt feels rejected.

At Goodwood, Bertie is disappointed when Ocean Breeze loses. Meanwhile, Lord Bittlesham is concerned because the bearded man, secretly Bingo, is there giving a speech. Bingo, who has lost his wager on Ocean Breeze, rants passionately against wealthy horse owners. Comrade Butt then speaks, but is less successful with the crowd than Bingo. After noticing Lord Bittlesham, Butt excites the crowd by exposing Bingo as Bittlesham's nephew, which gets Bingo in trouble with his uncle.

Two days later, Bertie learns that Bingo intends to go to the country for a while. Jeeves explains to Bertie that he informed Comrade Butt about Bingo being Lord Bittlesham's nephew. Pleased, Bertie tells Jeeves he may take the notes and coins on the dressing table, which amounts to fourteen pounds, one shilling, six pence, and a halfpenny.

== Background ==
At the beginning of the story, Bingo implies to Bertie that Lord Bittlesham must have paid a significant amount of money for his new title. This is a reference to the "cash for honors" scandal during that period, when Prime Minister David Lloyd George's government was accused of effectively selling peerages in order to raise money for the Liberal Party.

== Publication history ==
1922 Strand illustration by A. Wallis Mills

The story was illustrated by A. Wallis Mills in the Strand, and by T. D. Skidmore in Cosmopolitan. A collection of animal-related Wodehouse stories, A Wodehouse Bestiary, published by Ticknor & Fields in 1985, featured the story.

"Comrade Bingo" was included along with "The Rummy Affair of Old Biffy" in the 1976 anthology Classics of Humour, illustrated by Donald Room and published by Book Club Association. The anthology was later reissued in 1978 with the title Great Tales of Humour, published by Everyman's Library.

== Adaptations ==
=== Television ===
This story was adapted into part of the Jeeves and Wooster episode "Aunt Dahlia, Cornelia and Madeline", the sixth episode of the third series, which first aired in the UK on 3 May 1992. There are some differences in plot, including:

- In the episode, Bertie and Jeeves pretend to be sympathetic to the communist group. Jeeves pretends to be Bertie's "comrade" and not his servant.
- In the episode, Spode, having become Lord Sidcup, holds a farewell rally to his fascist group, the Black Shorts, at Goodwood, and Bingo is inspired to give a rousing speech to outdo Spode.
- In the episode, when revealing Bingo Little as Lord Bittlesham's nephew, Comrade Butt portrays Bingo as a villainous infiltrator rather than as a supporter of their group. A chaotic melee ensues, in which the Black Shorts fight against the Red Dawn, and Charlotte angrily knocks out Bingo.

=== Radio ===
This story, along with the rest of The Inimitable Jeeves, was adapted into a radio drama in 1973 as part of the series What Ho! Jeeves starring Michael Hordern as Jeeves and Richard Briers as Bertie Wooster.
