= Rosie M. Banks =

Fictional character by P. G. Wodehouse

- Jeeves, Drones Club character
- First appearance: "Bingo and the Little Woman" (1922)
- Last appearance: "Stylish Stouts" (1965)
- Created by: P. G. Wodehouse
- Portrayed by: Deborah Stanford; Jane Cussons; Anastasia Hille

In-universe information
- Gender: Female
- Occupation: Romance novelist
- Spouse: Bingo Little (husband)
- Children: Algernon Aubrey Little (son)
- Relatives: Lord Bittlesham (uncle-in-law)
- Nationality: British

Rosie M. Banks is a recurring fictional character in the Jeeves and Drones Club stories of British author P. G. Wodehouse, being a romance novelist and the wife of Bingo Little.

== Inspiration ==
The character was possibly inspired by the prolific early twentieth-century romance novelist Ruby M. Ayres. Wodehouse intentionally chose the name "Rosie M. Banks" to be similar to hers, stating in a 1955 letter to his biographer Richard Usborne that he "wanted a name that would give a Ruby M. Ayres suggestion". Another possible influence is the female novelist Ethel M. Dell (dell/banks = features of countryside scenery), who also has a middle initial of ’M’, a reputation for writing novels of the Rosie M. Banks sort, and is mentioned by name in several Wodehouse stories. Both novelists were exact contemporaries of Wodehouse.

== Life and character ==
Rosie M. Banks is a fictional romance novelist. A tall, lissom girl with soft, soulful brown eyes and a nice figure, she is devoted to her pekingese dogs and owns as many as six at a time.

She is the author of works such as: All for Love; A Red, Red Summer Rose; Madcap Myrtle; Only a Factory Girl; The Courtship of Lord Strathmorlick; The Woman Who Braved All; Mervyn Keene, Clubman; 'Twas Once in May; By Honour Bound; and A Kiss at Twilight. She also wrote the Christmas story "Tiny Fingers". Jeeves says that one of his aunts owns a complete collection of her works. The books of Rosie M. Banks make "very light, attractive reading", according to Jeeves, and he later says that the scene in Only a Factory Girl in which "Lord Claude takes the girl in his arms" (as described by Bertie Wooster) is one of his aunt's favourite passages. Other fans of her works include Bingo's uncle, Madeline Bassett, and American author Kirk Rockaway (in "Stylish Stouts").

However, not everyone enjoys her books. Bertie Wooster describes her writing as "some of the most pronounced and widely-read tripe ever put on the market", and Bertie's Aunt Dahlia does not like reading her works. Rosie's husband Bingo has said that when she gets in front of a dictating machine, she becomes "absolutely maudlin". Bingo nervously changes the subject every time his wife's books are brought up in conversation.

Initially mentioned in "Jeeves in the Springtime", she first appears in "Bingo and the Little Woman", in which she marries Bingo Little after meeting him in the Senior Liberal Club. Afterwards, she is known as Mrs. Little in private life, though she continues to write as Rosie M. Banks. At first, she is upset that Bertie Wooster had impersonated her, though they are friends by the next story in which she appears.

In "Clustering Round Young Bingo", she submitted an article for Milady's Boudoir (the women's paper of Dahlia Travers, Bertie's Aunt Dahlia), entitled "How I Keep the Love of My Husband-Baby", which, fortunately for her husband, has not been published. She employed chef extraordinaire Anatole until Aunt Dahlia stole him from her with the help of Jeeves in the same short story, and is thus unlikely to write further for Mrs Travers. However, the Littles did receive an excellent housemaid in a sort of exchange.

It is mentioned that she is going on a lecture tour in America in "Jeeves and the Impending Doom". She reunites with her old school friend Laura Pyke in "Jeeves and the Old School Chum". It is revealed in that story that Rosie is a Scripture Knowledge prize-winner (like Bertie Wooster), though while the two women are having an argument, Laura Pyke claims that Rosie cheated by sneaking in a list of the Kings of Judah (an accusation later repeated by Gussie Fink-Nottle against Bertie Wooster).

Rosie and Bingo's marriage is essentially happy, though she dislikes Bingo's penchant for gambling, and keeps him on a tight budget. The couple have a baby, Algernon "Algy" Aubrey Little, and Rosie manages to get Bingo a job as editor at Wee Tots, a journal for the home and nursery. The infant Algy is put up for membership in the Drones Club, and his godfather is Oofy Prosser.

In Wodehouse's novel Bachelors Anonymous, there is a brief reference to a line from Rosie M. Banks's A Kiss at Twilight. It is also mentioned in Bachelors Anonymous that her books often feature an impecunious heroine who receives a legacy, and that in one of her early novels, there is a passage in which the hero, Claude Delamere, who thinks his fiancée is deceiving him after seeing her kissing another man, felt "as if a blinding light had flashed upon him" when he found out this man is actually her brother from Australia.

== Appearances ==
Rosie M. Banks is featured in:

- The Inimitable Jeeves (1923)
  - "Bingo and the Little Woman" (1922) – Jeeves story, with an excerpt of text from The Woman Who Braved All
- Carry On, Jeeves (1925)
  - "Clustering Round Young Bingo" (1925) – Jeeves
- Very Good, Jeeves (1930)
  - "Jeeves and the Old School Chum" (1930) – Jeeves
- Eggs, Beans and Crumpets (1940)
  - "All's Well with Bingo" (1937) – Drones
  - "Bingo and the Peke Crisis" (1937) – Drones
  - "The Editor Regrets" (1939) – Drones
  - "Sonny Boy" (1939) – Drones, with a plot synopsis of "Tiny Fingers"
- A Few Quick Ones (1959)
  - "The Word in Season" (1940) – Drones
  - "Leave it to Algy" (1954) – Drones
- Nothing Serious (1950)
  - "The Shadow Passes" (1950) – Drones
- Plum Pie (1966)
  - "Bingo Bans the Bomb" (1965) – Drones
  - "Stylish Stouts" (1965) – Drones

Rosie M. Banks is mentioned in:

- The Inimitable Jeeves (1923)
  - "Jeeves in the Springtime" (1921) – Jeeves
- Very Good, Jeeves (1930)
  - "Jeeves and the Impending Doom" (1926) – Jeeves
- The Code of the Woosters (1938) – Jeeves (ch. 3)
- The Mating Season (1949) – Jeeves (ch. 12 and 17), with a plot synopsis of Mervyn Keene, Clubman
- Jeeves and the Feudal Spirit (1954) – Jeeves (ch. 4)
- Pearls, Girls and Monty Bodkin (1972) – Drone Monty Bodkin, with a plot synopsis of By Honour Bound
- Bachelors Anonymous (1973)

== Influence ==
Although the name of Ms. Banks is attributed to a fictional novelist, there have been uses of this name to sell romance novels in the past. The most notable, Navy Nurse, published in 1960, is attributed to novelist Rosie M. Banks. The author, one-time Saturday Evening Post editor Alan R. Jackson, applied to Wodehouse for the right to use the name; Wodehouse, much amused, gave his permission.

True to the genre, the jacket of the book summarises the novel thus:

A romantic, suspense-filled novel about a girl who chose a glamorous and exciting career. Alice Smith, pretty Navy nurse, had an attack of love at first sight. And she didn’t want to be cured.
The man was tall, good-looking and French. Thrilled by his kisses, Alice longed for the day she would be Mrs. Jacques Stern.
But Jacques never talked of marriage. And he was mysterious about his private life, especially the source of his wealth.
Meanwhile, the Office of Naval Intelligence had rated Jacques “top priority.” And handsome Morgan O’Neill, ONI agent, was making a particularly thorough check. Morgan loved Alice deeply. He’d stop at nothing to save her from the dangers that threatened her happiness — and her life.

In 2002, a group of Wodehouse fans from the Usenet newsgroup alt.fan.wodehouse also voted in large numbers to place the fictional Miss Banks' novel Only a Factory Girl in the list of the top 100 books at Random House. This remained intact for over a week until the administrators caught on and replaced Miss Banks with J. R. R. Tolkien.

== Adaptations ==
Television

- In BBC One's 1965–1967 black-and-white The World of Wooster, Rosie M. Banks was portrayed by Deborah Stanford.
- Jane Cussons portrayed Rosie in Wodehouse Playhouse, series 3, episode 5, "The Editor Regrets" (1978).
- Anastasia Hille played Rosie in Jeeves and Wooster, series 4 episode 3, "Honoria Glossop Turns Up" (1993); her work had been mentioned by Jeeves in series 2 episode 6, "Wooster with a Wife" (1991), where it is central to part of the plot, concerning Bingo Little.

== See also ==
- List of Jeeves characters, an alphabetical list of Jeeves characters
- List of P. G. Wodehouse characters in the Jeeves stories, a categorized outline of Jeeves characters
- List of Jeeves and Wooster characters, a list of characters in the television series
- Iain M. Banks
