= Jeeves and the Chump Cyril =

- Short story by P. G. Wodehouse
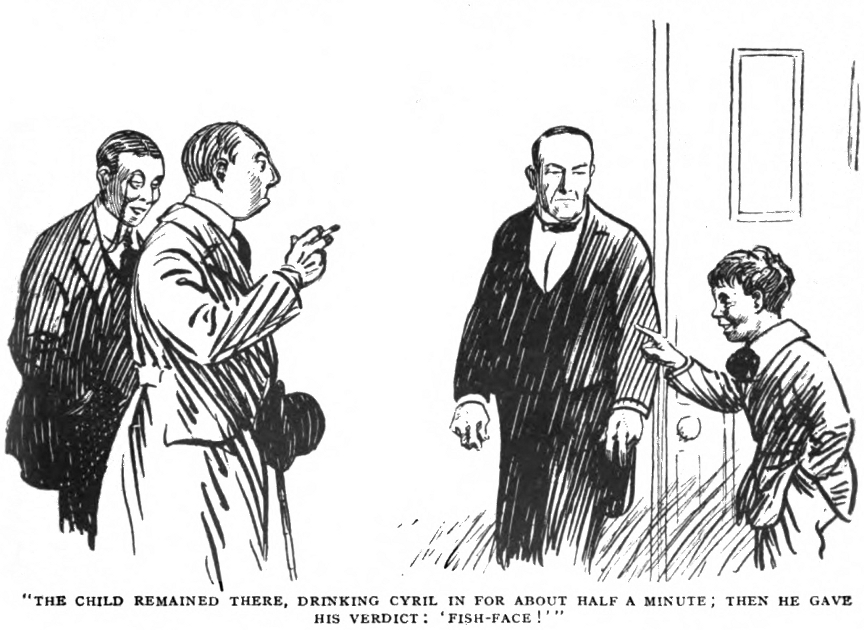
- 1918 Strand illustration by Alfred Leete
- Illustrator: Grant T. Reynard
- Country: United Kingdom
- Language: English
- Genre: Comedy

Publication
- Publisher: Saturday Evening Post (US); The Strand Magazine (UK)
- Media type: Print (Magazine)
- Publication date: 8 June 1918 (US); August 1918 (UK)

Chronology
- Series: Jeeves
Sir Roderick Comes to Lunch	Comrade Bingo

"Jeeves and the Chump Cyril" is a short story by P. G. Wodehouse, and features the young gentleman Bertie Wooster and his valet Jeeves. The story was published in the Saturday Evening Post in New York in June 1918, and in The Strand Magazine in London in August 1918. It was also included in the 1923 collection The Inimitable Jeeves as two separate chapters, "A Letter of Introduction" and "Startling Dressiness of a Lift Attendant".

The story takes place in New York. Bertie is told by his Aunt Agatha to keep her friend's son Cyril Bassington-Bassington from becoming a performer.

== Plot ==
=== A Letter of Introduction ===
One morning in New York, Jeeves tells Bertie a Cyril Bassington-Bassington visited earlier, with a letter of introduction from Bertie's Aunt Agatha, and will return later. Hoping to return to England in time for Goodwood, Bertie decides to appease his menacing Aunt Agatha by treating Cyril kindly. Bertie wears purple socks, though Jeeves disapproves. Cyril does not appear, so Bertie goes out to a club with a new pal, the playwright George Caffyn. Jeeves comes to the club, and informs Bertie that Cyril is in prison.

Bertie, Jeeves, and George go to the police station, and learn the hot-tempered Cyril had shoved a policeman. Bertie pays his bail. Cyril befriends George. Later, Bertie receives a cable from Aunt Agatha, instructing Bertie not to introduce Cyril to anyone involved with theatre. Bertie is concerned, but Jeeves is unsympathetic due to the purple socks.

The part which old George had written for the chump Cyril took up about two pages of typescript; but it might have been Hamlet, the way the poor, misguided pinhead worked himself to the bone over it.

— Cyril takes pride in his small part

Cyril visits Bertie and says he has a small part in George's musical comedy, Ask Dad. Though Cyril is supposed to go to Washington to improve himself, he has actually come to New York to perform, against his father's wishes. Bertie calls to ask George to remove Cyril from the show, but George refuses. At night, Bertie knocks on Jeeves's door. Jeeves, who was reading, appears in a dressing gown. Bertie tells him that Aunt Agatha will blame him if Cyril performs. Jeeves will consider the problem.

=== Startling Dressiness of a Lift Attendant ===
A letter from Aunt Agatha arrives, demanding that Bertie keep Cyril off the stage. Disturbed, Bertie seeks Jeeves, and finds him in the kitchen, entertaining a boy and the boy's father's valet, whom Jeeves knows. Bertie shows Jeeves the letter. Cyril appears, and the boy says Cyril has a fish face. This angers Cyril, and a confused altercation occurs. The boy gets away, yelling that Jeeves paid him to insult Cyril. Cyril and Bertie doubt this.

George invites Bertie to a run-through of his show. From the back of the theatre, Bertie sees that the boy from earlier is the son of the manager, Blumenfield. Blumenfield listens to all his son's opinions about the show; George suggests that this is because Blumenfield thinks a child has the same amount of intelligence as the average audience member. When the boy notices Cyril on stage, he says Cyril's face is no good, and Blumenfield agrees. Cyril yells at them, and Blumenfield fires Cyril.

Cyril tells Bertie that he is leaving for Washington, and lies about the reason. Bertie realizes Jeeves worked events to get Cyril fired. He thanks Jeeves. Leaving his rooms, Bertie decides he will let Jeeves get rid of the purple socks. However, the liftman thanks Bertie for the purple socks, which Jeeves gave him.

== Background ==
Ask Dad was the initial title of a 1918 musical comedy later retitled Oh, My Dear!, which Wodehouse collaborated on with Guy Bolton and Louis Hirsch. After its first night out of town, the musical's title was changed to Oh, My Dear! for its opening at the Princess Theatre. Five of the musical's songs were published under Ask Dad wrappers before being republished as part of the music of the renamed musical.

== Publication history ==
1918 Saturday Evening Post illustration by Grant T. Reynard

Though all short stories in The Inimitable Jeeves were published in the Strand, "Jeeves and the Chump Cyril" is the only short story in the collection that was first published in the U.S., and in the Saturday Evening Post. While it is the first story included in The Inimitable Jeeves by date of original publication, it is included as the ninth and tenth chapters of the collection.

The story was illustrated by Grant T. Reynard in the Saturday Evening Post, and by Alfred Leete in the Strand.

== Adaptations ==
=== Television ===
This story was adapted into part of the Jeeves and Wooster episode "Introduction on Broadway", the third episode of the third series, which first aired in the UK on 12 April 1992. There are some differences in plot, including:

- In the episode, Aunt Agatha's letter of introduction specifies that Cyril should not be introduced to people involved with theatre; Cyril tears up the letter before Bertie can read it. Bertie does not hear about Cyril until Cyril is in prison. Aunt Agatha does not send another message, and Bertie only finds out her wishes when she actually visits him in America.
- George does not go with Bertie and Jeeves to the police station in the episode; instead, Cyril says he enjoys theatre, and Bertie offers to introduce him to George.
- In the episode, Cyril only has one line in the show. The show is titled Ask Dad! rather than Ask Dad. Cyril goes on the show on a national tour, and Bertie tags along.
- Unlike the original story, the show makes it clear that Jeeves did tell young Blumenfield to say Cyril has a face like a fish.
- In the episode, Blumenfield learns that Cyril attacked his son, and fires him before he can perform; while Aunt Agatha is in the audience, Bertie has to take over for Cyril for the part, and on stage, he freezes and delivers his line incorrectly, after which the play is renamed Where is the Fire?.

=== Radio ===
This story, along with the rest of The Inimitable Jeeves, was adapted into a radio drama in 1973 as part of the series What Ho! Jeeves starring Michael Hordern as Jeeves and Richard Briers as Bertie Wooster.
