= Aunt Dahlia, Cornelia and Madeline =

- Jeeves and Wooster episode
- Episode no.: Season 3 Episode 6
- Directed by: Ferdinand Fairfax
- Original air date: 3 May 1992

Episode chronology
| ← Previous "Sir Watkyn Bassett's Memoirs" | Next → "Return to New York" |

"Aunt Dahlia, Cornelia And Madeline" is the sixth episode of the third series of the 1990s British comedy television series Jeeves and Wooster. It is also called "Comrade Bingo". It first aired on 3 May 1992 on ITV.

In the US, it was aired as the fourth episode of the second series of Jeeves and Wooster on Masterpiece Theatre, on 17 January 1993.

== Background ==
Adapted from "Comrade Bingo" (collected in The Inimitable Jeeves) and "Jeeves Makes an Omelette" (collected in A Few Quick Ones).

== Cast ==
- Bertie Wooster – Hugh Laurie
- Jeeves – Stephen Fry
- Spode – John Turner
- Aunt Dahlia – Patricia Lawrence
- Bingo Little – Pip Torrens
- Madeline Bassett – Elizabeth Morton
- Charlotte – Rachel Robertson
- Mr. Rowbotham – Peter Benson
- Comrade Butt – Colin Higgins
- Lord Bittlesham – Geoffrey Toone
- Lady Bittlesham – Brenda Kempner
- Cornelia – Ann Queensberry

== Plot ==
Bingo Little has joined The Red Dawn, an outspoken Communist group, to be near Charlotte Rowbotham, with whom he is in love. Bertie is pushed by Aunt Dahlia into going to Marsham Manor (near Goodwood) with her so she can get Cornelia Fothergill to sign her latest novel to her, so she can use it in her magazine. However, she doesn't tell Bertie that she wants him to steal a painting to accomplish this (we see why Bertie would never have made it as a burglar). Roderick Spode is also there, now the seventh earl of Sidcup (the sixth Earl having died) and is giving a farewell tour to his Black Shorts.

== See also ==
- List of Jeeves and Wooster characters
