= The Rummy Affair of Old Biffy =

- Short story by P. G. Wodehouse
- 1924 illustration in The Saturday Evening Post by Arthur William Brown
- Language: English
- Genre: Comedy

Publication
- Publisher: Saturday Evening Post (US); The Strand Magazine (UK)
- Media type: Print (Magazine)
- Publication date: 27 September 1924 (US); October 1924 (UK)

Chronology
- Series: Jeeves
| The Aunt and the Sluggard | Without the Option |

"The Rummy Affair of Old Biffy" is a short story by P. G. Wodehouse, and features the young gentleman Bertie Wooster and his valet Jeeves. The story was published in the Saturday Evening Post in the United States in September 1924, and in The Strand Magazine in the United Kingdom in October 1924. The story was also included in the 1925 collection Carry On, Jeeves.

Bertie's forgetful friend Biffy loses the woman he loves after he forgets her surname and address. He asks Bertie for help when he inadvertently gets engaged to the formidable Honoria Glossop instead.

== Plot ==
Bertie is staying in Paris, where he meets with an old friend, Charles "Biffy" Biffen. Biffy fell in love with a model named Mabel on an ocean liner going to New York. He proposed to her and she said yes. Biffy arranged to meet her at her hotel the next day, but he forgot the name of the hotel, and could not make inquiries because he forgot Mabel's last name. She knows Biffy's name and where he lives, but has not contacted him. Also, Biffy intends to sell the country house he inherited; he has a potential customer, Sir Roderick Glossop, the so-called nerve specialist.

Not more than ten days later, Bertie sees a marriage announcement in The Times for Biffy and Honoria Glossop. Bertie pities Biffy. Jeeves, however, does not show any sympathy. About a week later, in London, Bertie is visited by Biffy, who asks how Bertie got out of his engagement to Honoria. Jeeves is unwilling to help, so Bertie comes up with a plan: Biffy will use a bouquet version of a squirting flower on Sir Roderick Glossop (Honoria's father), making Glossop doubt his sanity and forbid the marriage. Bertie brings the bouquet to Biffy and explains his plan. Glossop soon arrives. While the three eat lunch, Glossop says that Honoria asked Biffy to bring Bertie to the British Empire Exhibition. Biffy gets Bertie to come as well. Biffy loses his nerve, and does not squirt Glossop.

Biffy's first slosh smashed the glass all to a hash. Three more cleared the way for him to go into the cage without cutting himself. And, before the crowd had time to realise what a wonderful bob's-worth it was getting in exchange for its entrance-fee, he was inside, engaging the girl in earnest conversation.

— Biffy reunites with Mabel

Bertie returns to his flat to get his car. With Jeeves, Bertie returns to Biffy's flat to pick up Biffy and Glossop. Bertie says privately to Jeeves that he should be concerned about Biffy, who lost the girl he loved. Jeeves asks what he means, and Bertie relates Biffy's story about forgetting Mabel's hotel and last name. When they reach the Exhibition, Jeeves drifts off, and Glossop leads Biffy and Bertie through exhibits. Bored, Bertie and Biffy sneak off to a bar. Biffy spots a building called the Palace of Beauty, and remembers that Jeeves told him to go there. In the Palace, women are dressed as famous women throughout history, each behind glass in a cage. Bertie, uncomfortable, wants to leave, but Biffy recognizes Mabel in one cage. He smashes the glass with his cane, and talks to her. Policemen arrive and take Biffy away. As they do, Biffy shouts at Bertie to write down Mabel's telephone number.

Glossop appears, and Bertie tells him that Biffy has had a fit. Glossop forbids the marriage between Biffy and Honoria, and leaves. The police will hold Biffy for the night. Bertie returns to his car to find Jeeves, who admits he knew Mabel would be at the Palace. Jeeves had been unhelpful at first because he believed that Biffy had abandoned Mabel. When Bertie told him the facts, Jeeves realized his mistake and directed Biffy to Mabel. Bertie is grateful, and asks Jeeves how he knew Mabel in the first place. Jeeves surprises Bertie by replying that she is Jeeves's niece, causing Bertie to almost crash the car.

== Publication history ==
Illustration in The Strand Magazine by A. Wallis Mills

The story was illustrated by Arthur William Brown in the Saturday Evening Post, and by A. Wallis Mills in the Strand.

The 1958 collection Selected Stories by P. G. Wodehouse included the story.

"The Rummy Affair of Old Biffy" was included in the anthology The Shelter Book: A Gathering of Tales, Poems, Essays, Notes and Notions Arranged by Clemence Dane for Use in Shelters, Tubes, Basements and Cellars in War-Time, published in 1940 and edited by Clemence Dane. The story was featured in the 1945 anthology Chucklebait: Funny Stories for Everyone, published by Knopf. It was also collected in the anthology Classics of Humour, published in 1976 by Book Club Association and illustrated by Donald Room, along with "Comrade Bingo". This anthology was reissued in 1978 under the title Great Tales of Humour, published by Everyman's Library.

== Adaptations ==
This story was adapted into the Jeeves and Wooster episode "Pearls Mean Tears", the third episode of the second series, which first aired on 28 April 1991. There are some differences in plot, including:

- In the episode, Bertie meets Biffy in an English resort, not in Paris, and Mabel is an actress, not a model.
- In the original story, Bertie already has a bouquet variation of a squirting flower; in the episode, Bertie gets a typical buttonhole squirting flower from Barmy Fotheringay-Phipps.
- In the original story, Biffy only has lunch with Sir Roderick Glossop and Bertie; in the episode, his wife Lady Glossop and daughter Honoria also come to lunch. Bertie tries to make Biffy use the squirting flower and causes a mess.
- In the original story, Biffy inherited his country home from his godmother. In the episode, he inherited it from his uncle Harold; at lunch, Bertie tells the Glossops that Harold read Shakespeare to his rabbits.
- The Palace of Beauty does not appear in the episode; instead, Jeeves directs Biffy to a play called Woof Woof! in which Mabel is performing. When he sees her, Biffy disrupts the show and shares an embrace with her. Biffy is not arrested.
