= The Ordeal of Young Tuppy =

- Short story by P. G. Wodehouse
- Country: United Kingdom
- Language: English
- Genre: Comedy

Publication
- Publisher: The Strand Magazine
- Media type: Print (Magazine)
- Publication date: April 1930

Chronology
- Series: Jeeves
Indian Summer of an Uncle	Thank You, Jeeves

"The Ordeal of Young Tuppy" is a short story by P. G. Wodehouse, and features the young gentleman Bertie Wooster and his valet Jeeves. The story was published in The Strand Magazine in the United Kingdom in April 1930, and in Cosmopolitan in the United States that same month, both as "Tuppy Changes His Mind". The story was also included as the eleventh story in the 1930 collection Very Good, Jeeves.

In the story, Tuppy Glossop falls for the athletic Miss Dalgleish, and endures a rough match of rugby football to win her over. Bertie's Aunt Dahlia wants Tuppy to lose interest in Miss Dalgleish and reunite with her daughter, Angela Travers.

== Plot ==
Jeeves packs for Bertie's upcoming visit to Bleaching Court, where Bertie hopes to use practical jokes to get revenge on Tuppy Glossop for tricking him into falling into the Drones Club swimming pool. Bertie gets a puzzling telegram from Tuppy, asking Bertie to bring Tuppy's football boots and an Irish water-spaniel to Bleaching Court. He is then visited by his Aunt Dahlia, who has heard that her daughter Angela's on-and-off fiancé Tuppy is flirting with an athletic girl named Miss Dalgleish who lives near Bleaching. The girl is fond of dogs; Bertie supposes Tuppy wants an Irish water-spaniel to give her as a gift. Aunt Dahlia wants Tuppy to go back to Angela. Jeeves says he will attend to the matter.

At Bleaching Court, Bertie gives Tuppy the football boots, but no Irish water-spaniel, which disappoints Tuppy. Tuppy is going to play in an upcoming rugby football match for Miss Dalgleish. Jeeves informs Bertie that the match, which pits two feuding villages, Upper Bleaching and Hockley-cum-Meston, against each other, is traditionally violent. However, Tuppy is eager to prove himself to Miss Dalgleish, despite Bertie's misgivings. Tuppy is in love with her. Bertie asks Jeeves to go to London and send a telegram, signed by his aunt, which says that Angela is seriously ill and keeps calling for Tuppy. Bertie plans to give Tuppy the telegram during a lull in the match, so that Tuppy will have seen how rough the football match is and then hurry back to Angela.

Until this moment, if asked, I would have said that Tuppy Glossop was, on the whole, essentially a pacific sort of bloke, with little or nothing of the tiger of the jungle in him. Yet here he was, running to and fro with fire streaming from his nostrils, a positive danger to traffic.

— Bertie is impressed by Tuppy

Bertie receives the fake telegram sent by Jeeves. The match begins, and Tuppy gets knocked down frequently. However, Bertie mistakenly left the telegram at the house. After a brief rest, Tuppy plays splendidly. Later, Bertie returns to his room and meets Jeeves. Bertie reports that he failed to deliver the telegram and, since Tuppy played so well, Miss Dalgleish is probably impressed by him.

However, Tuppy is upset when he comes to see Bertie. Despite the ordeal he went through for her, Miss Dalgleish did not even watch the game. She had received a telephone call from London from someone who had found an Irish water-spaniel, only it turned out to be a water-spaniel of the English variety. Bertie finally gives Tuppy the telegram. Tuppy is moved by the fake message, and goes to Angela. Bertie asks Jeeves if he was the one who called Miss Dalgleish about the Irish water-spaniel, and he was. Jeeves also explained the telegram to Aunt Dahlia, so everything will be ready for Tuppy's arrival. Bertie toasts with Jeeves to his success.

== Style ==
Some erudite phrases introduced by Jeeves, such as "a remote contingency" or "the psychology of the individual", become motifs and are repeated later in humorous ways by Bertie. One such phrase is "the mot juste", which is first used by Jeeves in "The Ordeal of Young Tuppy" and is repeated in all the novels up to The Mating Season.

Though Jeeves is the primary problem-solver in previous stories, in "The Ordeal of Young Tuppy", Bertie and Jeeves work together, and Jeeves even asks Bertie at one point "What course do you advocate, sir?" when Bertie tells him they must save Tuppy from the football match. Their collaboration is emphasized when Bertie figures out Jeeves's offstage activities in a way usually reserved for the reader:

I gave him the eye.
"Was it you, Jeeves, who phoned to Miss What's-her-bally-name about the alleged water-spaniel?"
"Yes, sir."
"I thought as much."
"Yes, sir?"
"Yes, Jeeves, the moment Mr Glossop told me that a Mysterious Voice had phoned on the subject of Irish water-spaniels, I thought as much. I recognized your touch. I read your motives like an open book. You knew she would come buzzing up."

The story also shows how Bertie's intelligence has increased since the beginning of the series, and how Jeeves and Bertie have come to see each other as friends and equals, which is shown when Bertie and Jeeves have a drink together for the first time at the end of the story to celebrate their success. Though Bertie goes through a rebellious phase in the first two Jeeves novels, the stories after the second novel, Right Ho, Jeeves, place Jeeves and Bertie in a relationship of increasing equality. For instance, whereas Bertie offers Jeeves a drink at the end of "The Ordeal of Young Tuppy" because Tuppy left it behind, the two sit down together over drinks in later stories: in a pub in The Mating Season and at the Junior Ganymede in Much Obliged, Jeeves.

== Background ==
Wodehouse discusses working on the story in a letter he wrote to his friend William Townend in 1929. In the letter, dated 11 November 1929, Wodehouse writes about the rugby football match which takes place in the story:

I've gone and let myself in for one of those stories which lead up to a big comic scene and now I'm faced with writing the scene and it looks as if it is going to be hard to make it funny. It's a village Rugger match, where everybody tries to slay everybody else, described by Bertie Wooster who, of course, knows nothing about Rugger. It's damned hard to describe a game you know backwards through the eyes of somebody who doesn't know it. However, I suppose it will come. These things always do. But it isn't easy to get the comic high spots.

Wodehouse ultimately wrote the following passage in "The Ordeal of Young Tuppy" in which Bertie tries to describe rugby football:

I know that the main scheme is to work the ball down the field somehow and deposit it over the line at the other end, and that, in order to squelch this programme, each side is allowed to put in a certain amount of assault and battery and do things to its fellow man which, if done elsewhere, would result in fourteen days without the option, coupled with some strong remarks from the Bench.

== Publication history ==
The story was illustrated by Charles Crombie in the Strand and by James Montgomery Flagg in Cosmopolitan.

"The Ordeal of Young Tuppy" was featured in the 1958 collection Selected Stories by P. G. Wodehouse, published by The Modern Library.

The 1935 anthology The Great Book of Humour, published by Odhams, included the story.

== Adaptations ==
=== Television ===
This story was adapted into the Jeeves and Wooster episode "Wooster with a Wife", the sixth episode of the second series, which first aired on 19 May 1991. There are some changes in plot, including:

- In the episode, there is no mention of the Drones Club pool incident, and Bertie does not want to play practical jokes on Tuppy for revenge.
- In the original story, Bertie is unwilling to get a dog for Tuppy since he is upset about the Drones Club pool incident; in the episode, Jeeves cannot find an Irish water-spaniel, and instead acquires an Irish Wolfhound named Patrick for Tuppy.
- In the original story, Tuppy and Angela quarrel because Tuppy told her that her new hat made her look like a Pekingese; in the episode, Tuppy told her that her new hat made her look like a raccoon peering out from underneath a flowerpot. In fact, the Pekingese remark is mentioned in an earlier episode, "The Hunger Strike".
- In the original story, Bertie hears the story of Tuppy and Angela's break-up from Aunt Dahlia; in the episode, Aunt Dahlia does not make an appearance, so Bertie hears the news from Tuppy and decides to intercede on his own initiative.
- In the episode, Miss Dalgleish is given a first name: Daisy.
- Tuppy does not become as formidable a player in the episode as he does in the original story, at least initially, and his leg is broken by his own overenthusiastic, victorious teammates in the episode; it takes Bingo Little and Bertie to help Tuppy, who is in a cast, into Bingo's car on the return trip to London the day after the match.

=== Radio ===
"The Ordeal of Young Tuppy" was adapted into a radio drama in 1976 as part of the series What Ho! Jeeves starring Michael Hordern as Jeeves and Richard Briers as Bertie Wooster.
