= Rosie Banks =

Rosie Banks may refer to

- Rosie Banks, from list of Brookside characters played by Susan Twist 1994–1996
- Rosie M. Banks, fictional romance novelist character in the Jeeves and Drones Club stories of P. G. Wodehouse
- Rosie Banks, pseudonymous author for the Secret Princesses series of children's books by Orchard Books, part of Hachette
