= Jeeves in the Springtime =

Short story by P. G. Wodehouse

- Short story by P. G. Wodehouse
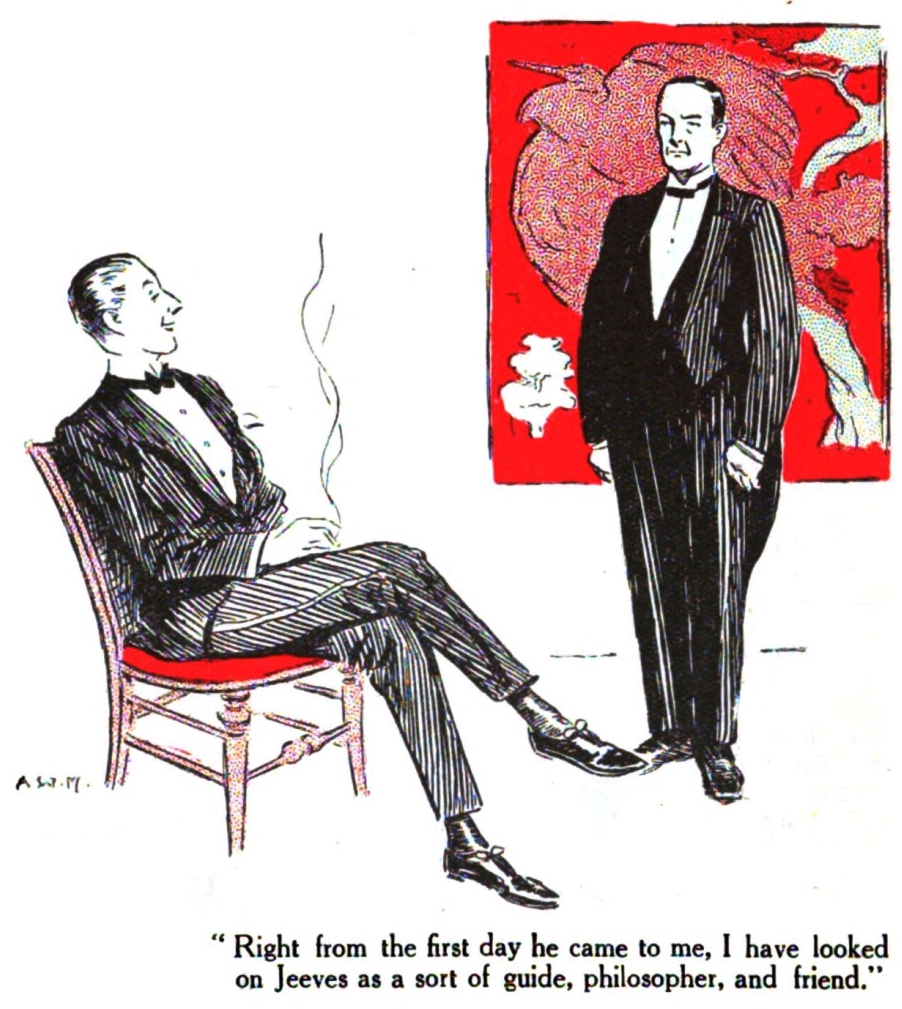
- 1921 Strand illustration by A. Wallis Mills
- Country: United Kingdom
- Language: English
- Genre: Comedy

Publication
- Publisher: The Strand Magazine (UK); Cosmopolitan (US)
- Media type: Print (Magazine)
- Publication date: December 1921

Chronology
- Series: Jeeves
—	Aunt Agatha Takes the Count

"Jeeves in the Springtime" is a short story by P. G. Wodehouse, and features the young gentleman Bertie Wooster and his valet Jeeves. The story was published in The Strand Magazine in December 1921 in London, and in Cosmopolitan in New York that same month. The story was also included in the 1923 collection The Inimitable Jeeves as two separate chapters, "Jeeves Exerts the Old Cerebellum" and "No Wedding Bells for Bingo".

In the story, Bertie's friend Bingo Little wants to marry a waitress, and asks for help from Bertie and Jeeves to get his uncle to approve of her. Jeeves suggests a plan involving romance novels.

== Plot ==
=== Jeeves Exerts the Old Cerebellum ===
Bertie is appalled by his friend Bingo Little's new crimson tie, which is decorated with horseshoes. Bingo received it from a waitress named Mabel. It is springtime, and Bingo, who always falls in love in the spring, is in love with Mabel. He met her at a charity subscription (i.e., pay-to-attend) dance, where Bingo also happened to see Bertie's valet Jeeves.

Bingo depends on his uncle Mr. Mortimer Little for an allowance, and fears Mr. Little will not approve of Bingo marrying a waitress. To get married, Bingo needs his uncle's approval and also an increase in his allowance. Bingo asks Bertie to pose the problem to Jeeves, who often helps Bertie's pals. When Bertie asks Jeeves for advice, Jeeves agrees to help. He already knows about Mr. Mortimer Little because he is engaged to Mr. Little's cook, Miss Watson. This news surprises Bertie.

Knowing that the elder Mr. Little is bedridden with gout, Jeeves suggests that Bingo take the opportunity to read to him. Particularly, Jeeves suggests books by the romance novelist Rosie M. Banks, which portray inter-class marriage as not only possible but noble. Bertie approves the scheme and asks Jeeves to fetch the books for Bingo.

=== No Wedding Bells for Bingo ===
"I've always said, and I always shall say, that for sheer brains, Jeeves, you stand alone. All the other great thinkers of the age are simply in the crowd, watching you go by."
"Thank you very much, sir. I endeavour to give satisfaction."

— Bertie praises Jeeves for his apparent success

Bingo's uncle is deeply moved by the books, and Bertie is confident that Jeeves's plan will succeed. Later, Bingo tells Bertie that his uncle, who has recovered from his gout, wants to have lunch with Bertie. Bingo asks Bertie to tell his uncle that Bingo wants to marry a waitress, which Bingo does not have the nerve to do himself. Though reluctant, Bertie agrees.

He has lunch with Mr. Little, who extols Bertie's accomplishments. This confuses Bertie, who has not done much. Bingo telephones to tell Bertie that, to increase Bertie's influence, Bingo told his uncle that Bertie is the author Rosie M. Banks. Bertie maintains the ruse, albeit unhappily.

Bertie tells Mr. Little that Bingo wants to marry a waitress, and Mr. Little, moved by the books, approves. When Bertie asks him to raise Bingo's allowance, however, Mr. Little refuses, saying it would not be fair to the woman he soon intends to marry, his cook, Miss Watson.

Bertie is sorry to have to tell Jeeves that the woman he was engaged to, Miss Watson, has chosen someone else. Yet Jeeves admits he had wanted to end the engagement anyway. In fact, he has another engagement of sorts with another girl, Mabel, the waitress whom Bingo had wanted to marry.

== Background ==
References to international conflicts are rare in Wodehouse's stories, though a subtle reference appears in this story; Bertie asks Jeeves if there is any news in the papers, to which Jeeves replies, "Some slight friction threatening in the Balkans, sir. Otherwise, nothing." This references the First World War and acknowledges the nonchalance generally exhibited by Edwardian England towards the gathering European crisis before the war broke out. Wodehouse was similarly disengaged in the face of war; according to Wodehouse scholar Robert McCrum, Wodehouse "carried on writing about an imaginary world that seemed far more vivid to him than the reality of his own times".

== Publication history ==
1921 Cosmopolitan illustration by T. D. Skidmore

The story was illustrated by A. Wallis Mills in The Strand Magazine, and by T. D. Skidmore in Cosmopolitan. Separated into two parts, the story was included in the 1932 collection Nothing But Wodehouse.

Along with the other short stories in the collections The Inimitable Jeeves, Carry On, Jeeves, and Very Good, Jeeves, "Jeeves in the Springtime" was included in the Jeeves Omnibus, published 30 October 1931 by Herbert Jenkins Ltd. The story was featured again in the second edition of the collection, which was published July 1967 and retitled The World of Jeeves. The second edition included two Jeeves short stories written after the first edition was published.

The story was collected in the 1935 anthology The Big Book of Great Short Stories, published by Odhams Press, and in the 1982 anthology Present Laughter, A Personal Anthology of Modern Humour, published by Robson Books.

== Adaptations ==
=== Television ===
The story was adapted for an episode of The World of Wooster. Though titled "Jeeves Exerts the Old Cerebellum", the episode was based on the full short story. It was the fourth episode of the second series and was originally broadcast in the UK on 25 January 1966.

This story was adapted in the Jeeves and Wooster episode "Wooster with a Wife", the sixth and final episode of the second series, which first aired in the UK on 19 May 1991. There are minor differences in plot, including:

- In the episode, Jeeves is strongly affected by the sight of Bingo wearing a tie with horseshoes, though Jeeves never sees the tie in the original story.
- Bingo's uncle is already Lord Bittlesham at the beginning of the episode, though he did not yet have this title in the original story.
- In the episode, Bingo's uncle is never bedridden with gout.
- There is no mention of a subscription dance in the episode.
- Instead of only Bertie and Bingo's uncle eating lunch together, in the episode they are joined by Bingo and Bingo's young cousin Margaret, who was not in the original story.

=== Radio ===
This story, along with the rest of The Inimitable Jeeves, was adapted into a radio drama in 1973 as part of the series What Ho! Jeeves starring Michael Hordern as Jeeves and Richard Briers as Bertie Wooster.
