= Wooster with a Wife =

- Jeeves and Wooster episode
- Episode no.: Season 2 Episode 6
- Directed by: Simon Langton
- Original air date: 19 May 1991

Episode chronology
← Previous "Kidnapped!"	Next → "Bertie Sets Sail"

"Wooster with a Wife" is the sixth episode of the second series of the 1990s British comedy television series Jeeves and Wooster. It is also called "Jeeves the Matchmaker". It first aired in the UK on 19 May 1991 on ITV.

In the US, the episode was aired as the third episode of the fourth series of Jeeves and Wooster. It aired on 22 January 1995 on Masterpiece Theatre.

== Background ==
Adapted from "Bertie Changes His Mind" (collected in Carry On, Jeeves), "Jeeves and the Kid Clementina" (collected in Very Good, Jeeves), "The Ordeal of Young Tuppy" (from Very Good, Jeeves), and "Jeeves in the Springtime" (collected in The Inimitable Jeeves). Filming locations include Chenies Manor.

== Cast ==
- Jeeves – Stephen Fry
- Bertie Wooster – Hugh Laurie
- Tuppy Glossop – Robert Daws
- Bingo Little – Michael Siberry
- Bobbie Wickham – Niamh Cusack
- Lord Bittlesham – Geoffrey Toone
- Sir Reginald Dalgleish – Hubert Rees
- Lady Dalgleish – Sonia Graham
- Daisy Dalgleish – Catherine McQueen
- Miss Mapleton – Janet Henfrey
- Mabel – Charlotte Avery
- Clementina – Hermione Eyre
- Margaret – Marissa Dunlop

== Plot ==
Bertie is interested in parenthood, and decides to begin by marrying Bobbie Wickham. Jeeves does not approve; but Bobbie is too preoccupied with other things to give Bertie due attention. Meanwhile Bertie must put up with her niece Clementina, who has a ferocious appetite. After speaking at a girls' school, he gets another view of children and a dislike of children. The girls' behaviour towards him convinces Bertie to hate and dislike children and he knocks the idea of parenthood on the head.

Tuppy Glossop has broken off with Angela Travers again and is infatuated with dog-lover Daisy Dalgleish. Tuppy is convinced he can impress her in a rugby match, but Jeeves interferes.

Bingo Little is also in love, with a tea shop waitress. His obstacle is his allowance from his Uncle Mortimer, who may not approve the match. Jeeves recommends his uncle be regularly read romance novels to soften him up.

== See also ==
- List of Jeeves and Wooster characters
