= The Full House =

- Jeeves and Wooster episode
- Episode no.: Season 3 Episode 2
- Directed by: Ferdinand Fairfax
- Original air date: 5 April 1992

Episode chronology
← Previous "Bertie Sets Sail"	Next → "Cyril And The Broadway Musical"

"The Full House" is the second episode of the third series of the 1990s British comedy television series Jeeves and Wooster. It is also called "Bertie Ensures Bicky Can Continue To Live In Manhattan". It first aired in the UK on 5 April 1992 on ITV.

In the US, "The Full House" was one of five episodes that were not aired as part of the original broadcast of Jeeves and Wooster on Masterpiece Theatre, though all episodes were made available on US home video releases. The episode "Honoria Glossop Turns Up" was aired as the second episode of the third series instead.

== Background ==
Adapted from "Jeeves and the Hard-boiled Egg" (collected in Carry On, Jeeves) and "The Aunt and the Sluggard" (collected in Carry On, Jeeves).

== Cast ==
- Jeeves – Stephen Fry
- Bertie Wooster – Hugh Laurie
- Francis "Bicky" Bickersteth – Julian Firth
- Rockmetteller "Rocky" Todd – John Fitzgerald-Jay
- Edgar Gascoyne Bickersteth, 8th Duke of Chiswick – John Savident
- Isabel Rockmetteller – Heather Canning
- Jimmy Mundy – Lou Hirsch
- Liftman, Mr Coneybear – Ricco Ross
- Officer Corrigan – Sam Douglas
- Birdsburger – Matt Zimmerman
- Birdsburger – Bill Reimbold

== Plot ==
The episode takes place in New York, and has two subplots. One involves poet Rockmetteller "Rocky" Todd who wants a quiet life in his cabin in the Long Island woods. But his wealthy aunt, Isabel Rockmetteller, whom he is named after, wants him out clubbing every night and to send her a report of what is going on. Rocky is afraid of being cut out of her will if he does not do as she says. Jeeves goes clubbing in his place and Rocky writes reports based on Jeeves' experiences. However, he makes it sound so good that the aunt decides to come to for herself. Bertie is forced to lend Rocky his flat, since that is the address given to Aunt Isabel in Rocky's letters.

Meanwhile, Edgar Gascoyne Bickersteth, 8th Duke of Chiswick, the luxury-hating father of Francis Bickersteth ("Bicky") believes, that his son is in Colorado learning farming if he wants to keep his allowance. Bicky is staying in New York and the Duke of Chiswick finds out. He arrives in New York and believes Bertie's apartment belongs to his son, and seeing that Bicky is apparently doing well, cuts his allowance off. Since Bicky needs funds to start a chicken farm, something he believes will make him independent of his allowance, this happens at an unfortunate time for him.

Jeeves solves Rocky's dilemma by giving Aunt Isabel misleading directions to a show; she ends up at a temperance meeting, which causes her to change her views, and she insists on Rocky leaving New York in order to live quietly in the countryside.

As for Bicky's situation, Jeeves suggests charging a fee to let people shake the Duke's hand, which would give Bicky enough money for the chicken farm. His father would not approve of the scheme and has to be convinced that a large group of men who queue up to shake his hand are all friends of his son. The ruse is discovered, however, and the Duke tells Bicky he must come back to England with him, when Jeeves suggests that the story about the deceived Duke could be sold to the newspapers. As the Duke abhors reporters, he agrees to keep paying Bicky an allowance.

== See also ==
- List of Jeeves and Wooster characters
