= Heather Canning =

English actress (1933–1996)

- Heather Canning playing Isabel Rockmetteller
- Born: Heather Joan Canning; 5 January 1933; Epsom, Surrey, England
- Died: 30 May 1996 (aged 63); Oxford, Oxfordshire, England
- Occupation: actress
- Spouse: Leon Lissek (1969–1996; her death)

Heather Joan Canning (5 January 1933 – 30 May 1996) was an English actress, who is best known for her television roles. She played Isabel Rockmetteller in "The Full House", the second episode of the third series of the 1990s British comedy television series Jeeves and Wooster.

== Career ==
Canning's stage work included appearances with the RSC, in the West End, and on Broadway. Her television roles included the soap opera Crossroads (1964), playing Shirley Coniston, and again in 1978 as Adrienne Palmer; in Morning Story (1970). She was also known for Miss Julie (1972), Tis Pity She's a Whore (1980) and A Village Affair (1995).

== Personal life ==
Canning was born in Epsom, Surrey. She was married to the Australian actor Leon Lissek. She died, aged 63, in Oxford.
