= The Delayed Arrival =

- Jeeves and Wooster episode
- Episode no.: Season 4 Episode 4
- Directed by: Ferdinand Fairfax
- Original air date: 6 June 1993

Episode chronology
← Previous "Bridegroom Wanted!"	Next → "Trouble at Totleigh Towers"

"The Delayed Arrival" is the fourth episode of the fourth series of the 1990s British comedy television series Jeeves and Wooster. It is also called "Arrested in a Night Club". It first aired in the UK on 6 June 1993 on ITV.

In the US, it was aired as the third episode of the third series of Jeeves and Wooster on Masterpiece Theatre, on 24 October 1993. "Jeeves Saves the Cow-Creamer" aired as the fourth episode of the fourth series instead.

== Background ==
Adapted from Jeeves and the Feudal Spirit.

== Cast ==
- Bertie Wooster – Hugh Laurie
- Jeeves – Stephen Fry
- Aunt Dahlia – Jean Heywood
- Florence Craye – Francesca Folan
- Stilton Cheesewright – Nicholas Palliser
- Percy Gorringe – Walter James
- Uncle Tom – Ralph Michael
- Mrs Trotter – Sylvia Kay
- Mr Trotter – John Rapley
- Magistrate – Peter Howell
- Mr Burwash – James Ottaway
- Seppings – Ian Collier
- Oofy Prosser – Richard Dixon
- Police – Jon Croft, Peter Diamond, Jim Barclay

== Plot ==
Aunt Dahlia's magazine is in deep money trouble again so she wants to sell it to a Mr Trotter. To make it more saleable, she plans on paying a thousand pounds to a famous novelist for a story, which means she has to pawn her pearl necklace. Meanwhile, Lady Florence Craye has an on-off engagement with the homicidal Darcy "Stilton" Cheesewright, with Bertie being the cause of the break-ups. An expert is brought in to value the pearls, which have been replaced with fakes, and there is a race on to sell the magazine and get the real ones back in time. Aunt Dahlia wants help from Jeeves to find a pearl necklace she has pawned. Jeeves appears in drag in this episode to impersonate the novelist Daphne Dolores Morehead.

== See also ==
- List of Jeeves and Wooster characters
