= Return to New York (Jeeves and Wooster) =

- Jeeves and Wooster episode
- Episode no.: Season 4 Episode 1
- Directed by: Ferdinand Fairfax
- Original air date: 16 May 1993

Episode chronology
| ← Previous "Aunt Dahlia, Cornelia And Madeline " | Next → "Lady Florence Craye Arrives in New York" |

"Return to New York" is the first episode of the fourth series of the 1990s British comedy television series Jeeves and Wooster. It first aired in the UK on 16 May 1993 on ITV.

In the US, it was aired as the first episode of the third series of Jeeves and Wooster on Masterpiece Theatre, on 10 October 1993. "Pearls Mean Tears" aired as the first episode of the fourth series instead.

== Background ==
Adapted from "The Spot of Art" (collected in Very Good, Jeeves), "The Delayed Exit of Claude and Eustace" (collected in The Inimitable Jeeves), and "Fixing it for Freddie" (collected in Carry On, Jeeves).

== Cast ==
- Bertie Wooster – Hugh Laurie
- Jeeves – Stephen Fry
- Aunt Agatha – Elizabeth Spriggs
- Tuppy Glossop – Robert Daws
- Eustace Wooster – Joss Brook
- Claude Wooster – Jeremy Brook
- Gwladys Pendlebury – Deirdre Strath
- Elizabeth Vickers – Briony Glassco
- Lucius Pim – Marcus D'Amico
- Slingsby – Harry Ditson
- Mrs Slingsby – Marcia Layton
- Liftman Coneybear – Joseph Mydell
- May Prysock – Devon Scott

== Plot ==
Aunt Agatha wants to pack her wayward nephews Claude and Eustace Wooster off to Africa but both have fallen in love with a singer at a nightclub Bertie took them to the night before, and sneak back from the docks to Bertie's place to pursue her. Bertie wants to marry the portrait painter Gwladys Pendlebury. Aunt Agatha dislikes her portrait painting by Gwladys Pendlebury. Her portrait painting is used by the soup manufacturer Slingsby's Superb Soup as "Granny's Favorite" SLINGSBY'S Olde Englyshe Cock-a-Leekie Soup. Bertie's efforts to help Tuppy end in a disaster and Aunt Agatha ends up as a laughing stock, and looking for the cause, blames Bertie.

== See also ==
- List of Jeeves and Wooster characters
