= Grant Reynard =

American painter

Grant Tyson Reynard
- Born: October 20, 1887; Grand Island, Nebraska
- Died: August 13, 1968 (aged 80); Leonia, New Jersey
- Education: Art Institute of Chicago
- Occupations: Painter, etcher, lithographer and illustrator
- Spouse: Gwendolyn Crawford
- Children: 2 daughters

Grant Reynard (October 20, 1887 – August 13, 1968) was an American painter, etcher, lithographer and illustrator.

== Life ==
Reynard was born on October 20, 1887, in Grand Island, Nebraska. He studied at the Art Institute of Chicago.

Reynard became a painter, etcher and lithographer in New Jersey. He drew illustrations for Redbook, The Saturday Evening Post, Harper's Bazaar, Collier's and Cosmopolitan. He was the president of the Montclair Art Museum, and a member of the National Academy of Design and the American Watercolor Society.

Reynard married Gwendolyn Crawford, and they had two daughters. He died on August 13, 1968, in Leonia, New Jersey. His work can be seen at the Museum of Nebraska Art, the Fine Arts Museums of San Francisco, the Metropolitan Museum of Art, the National Gallery of Art, and the Smithsonian American Art Museum.
