= Honoria Glossop =

Fictional character in P. G. Wodehouse stories

- Jeeves character
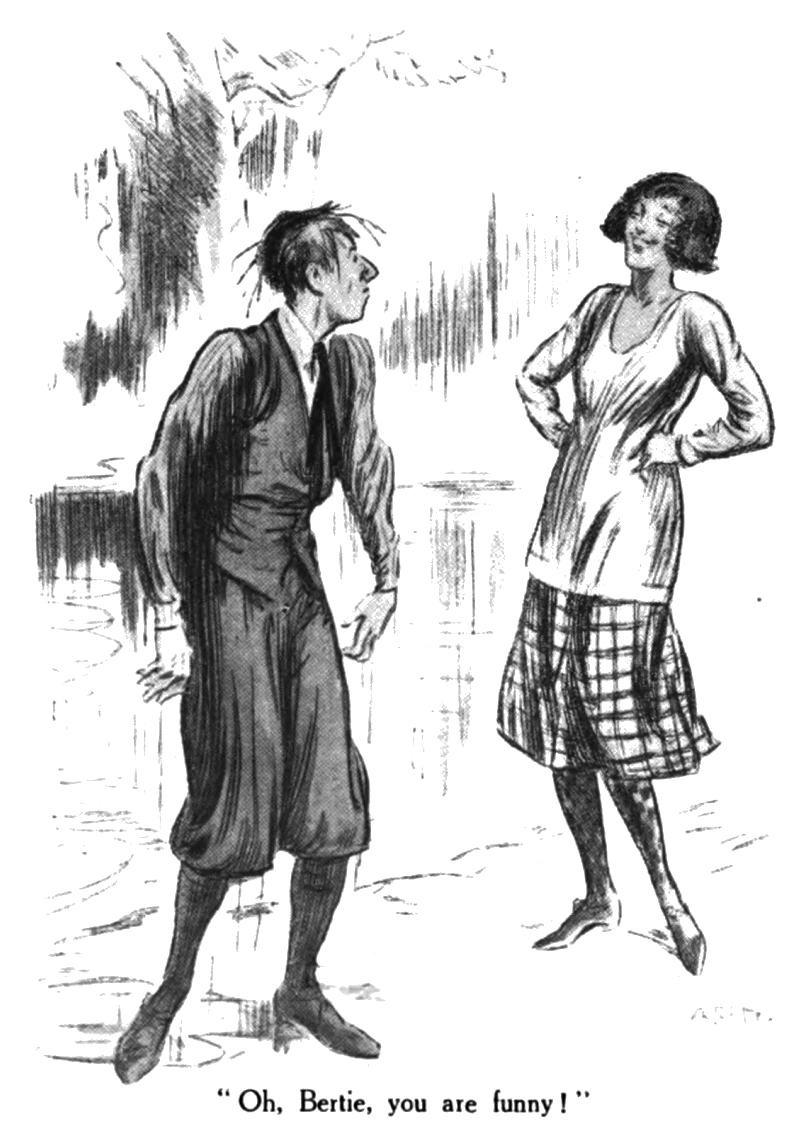
- Honoria (right) laughing in "Scoring off Jeeves" illustrated by A. Wallis Mills in 1922
- First appearance: "Scoring off Jeeves" (1922)
- Last appearance: "Jeeves and the Greasy Bird" (1965)
- Created by: P. G. Wodehouse
- Portrayed by: Donna Lynne Champlin; Miriam Margolyes and others

In-universe information
- Full name: Honoria Jane Louise Glossop
- Gender: Female
- Family: Sir Roderick Glossop (father); Lady Glossop (mother) (deceased); Oswald Glossop (brother)
- Relatives: Tuppy Glossop (cousin); Heloise Pringle (cousin)
- Nationality: British

Honoria Glossop is a recurring fictional character in the Jeeves stories by English comic writer P. G. Wodehouse. Athletic as well as scholarly, she is a formidable young lady and one of the women whom Bertie Wooster reluctantly becomes engaged to.

== Life and character ==
Honoria Glossop (full name Honoria Jane Louise Glossop) is the daughter of Sir Roderick Glossop and the older sister of Oswald Glossop. Large, brainy, and athletic, she has an assertive personality and a forceful voice. She plays every kind of sport, and Bertie suspects she may have boxed for her university. She has a strong presence; Bertie notes that "there is something about Honoria which makes almost anybody you meet in the same room seem sort of under-sized and trivial by comparison." A graduate of Girton College, Cambridge, she is interested in intellectual pursuits and reads Nietzsche and Ruskin.

In the Jeeves canon Honoria is engaged to Bertie Wooster twice. The first instance occurs sometime around the end of Scoring off Jeeves. Bertie does not actually want to marry her, but he is too intimidated by Honoria, and by his Aunt Agatha, who wants him to marry Honoria, to turn her down. The engagement is over by the end of Sir Roderick Comes to Lunch. Both short stories appear in The Inimitable Jeeves.

Honoria is briefly engaged to Bertie's friend "Biffy" Biffen in The Rummy Affair of Old Biffy. Honoria has a cousin, Heloise Pringle, who appears in the short story Without the Option. Heloise resembles her cousin in almost every respect. Both of these stories are collected in Carry On, Jeeves.

She is mentioned in Jeeves and the Yule-tide Spirit (in Very Good, Jeeves), in which Aunt Agatha's plan to have the engagement between Honoria and Bertie restored is thwarted by Jeeves.

Bertie finds himself engaged to Honoria a second time in the short story Jeeves and the Greasy Bird after courting her to make the novelist Blair Eggleston jealous, hoping that Blair will be compelled to admit his feelings to Honoria. Though events do not proceed exactly as Bertie has planned, Honoria returns Blair's feelings and ultimately she is engaged to Blair. Blair Eggleston had previously appeared in the novel Hot Water.

== Appearances ==
- The Inimitable Jeeves (1923)
  - Scoring off Jeeves (1922)
  - Sir Roderick Comes to Lunch (1922)
- Carry On, Jeeves (1925)
  - The Rummy Affair of Old Biffy (1924)
- Plum Pie (1966)
  - Jeeves and the Greasy Bird (1965)

Honoria is mentioned in several stories, including:

- Carry On, Jeeves (1925)
  - Without the Option (1925)
- Very Good, Jeeves (1930)
  - Jeeves and the Yule-tide Spirit (1927)
- Thank You, Jeeves (1934)
- Joy in the Morning (1946)

== Quotes ==
Honoria is distinctive for her vigorous laugh, which is described in several different stories by Bertie Wooster:

- "She chucked back her head and laughed with considerable vim. She had a penetrating sort of laugh. Rather like a train going into a tunnel."
- "I was interrupted in my meditations by a noise like the Scotch express going under a bridge. It was Honoria Glossop laughing."
- "Honoria, you see, is one of those robust, dynamic girls with the muscles of a welter-weight and a laugh like a squadron of cavalry charging over a tin bridge."
- "How it happened, I couldn't tell you to this day, but I once got engaged to [Sir Roderick Glossop's] daughter, Honoria, a ghastly dynamic exhibit who read Nietzsche and had a laugh like waves breaking on a stern and rock-bound coast."
- "Honoria Glossop was hearty, yes. Her laugh was like a steam-riveting machine, and from a child she had been a confirmed back-slapper."

== Adaptations ==
Television

- Joanna Rigby portrayed Honoria in the 1965–1967 television series The World of Wooster.
- Elizabeth Kettle played Honoria in the 1990–1993 television series Jeeves and Wooster.

Stage

- In the 1975 musical Jeeves, Honoria was portrayed by Angela Easterling.
- In the London premiere of By Jeeves, the 1996 rewrite of the previous musical, Honoria was portrayed by Lucy Tregear.

Film

- Donna Lynne Champlin played Honoria in the 2001 recording of the musical By Jeeves.

Radio

- Honoria was voiced by Miriam Margolyes in the 1973–1981 series What Ho! Jeeves.

== See also ==
- List of Jeeves characters, an alphabetical list of Jeeves characters
- List of P. G. Wodehouse characters in the Jeeves stories, a categorized outline of Jeeves characters
- List of Jeeves and Wooster characters, a list of characters in the television series
