= Arthur William Brown =

Canadian illustrator (1881–1966)

- Born: January 26, 1881; Hamilton, Ontario
- Died: 1966 (aged 84–85)
- Occupation: Illustrator

Arthur William Brown (1881–1966) was a Canadian commercial artist, most known for his work as an illustrator for the Saturday Evening Post, American Magazine, and Redbook.

== Education and works ==
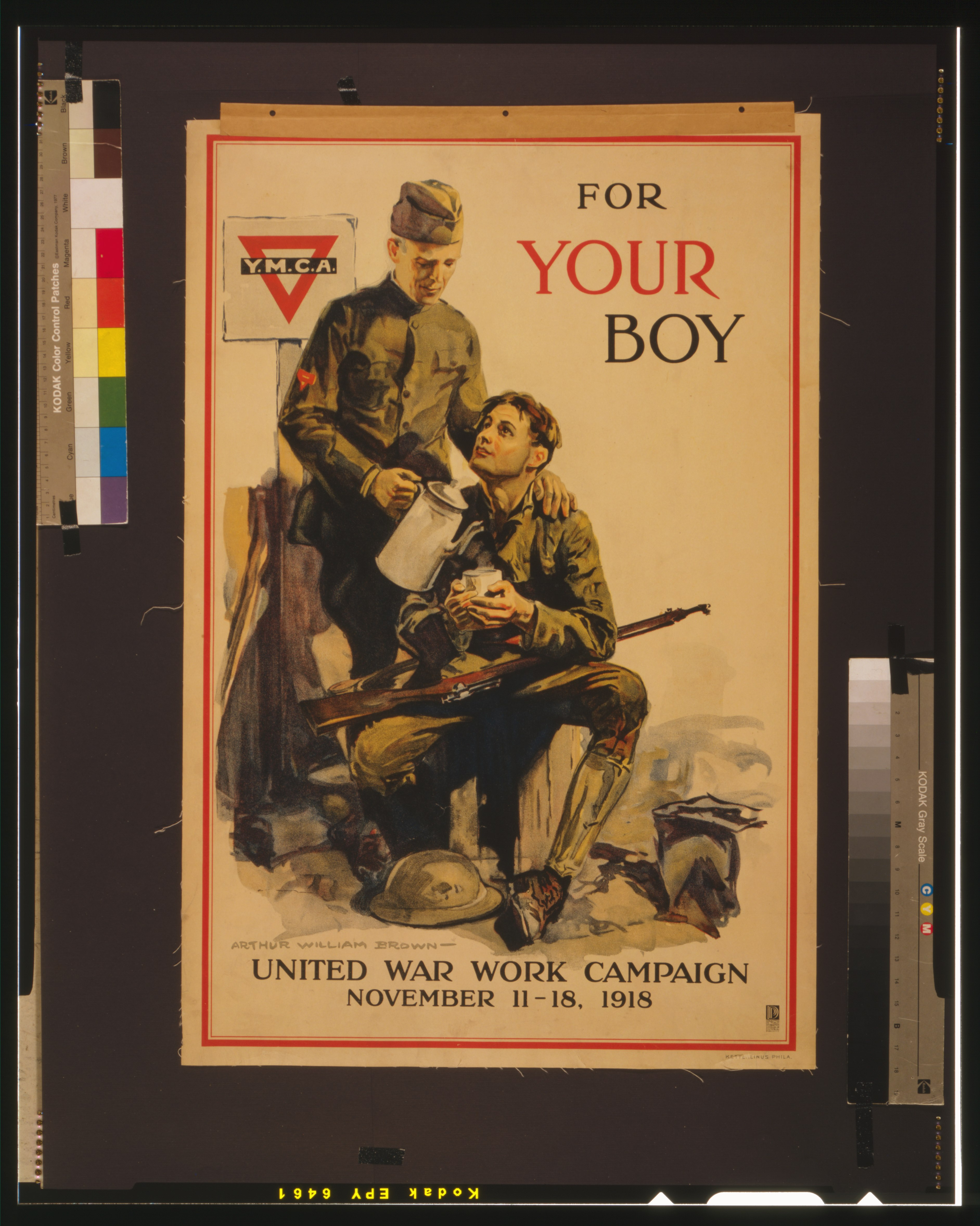
A YMCA poster created for the United War Work Campaign

In the 1890s, he attended the Hamilton Art School and studied under John Sloan Gordon. At the age of 16, he was hired as a chalk plate artist for the Hamilton Spectator. He later left Hamilton and attended the Art Students League in New York City, and studied under Walter Appleton Clark, Frank DuMond, and F. R. Gruger. He was later hired as an illustrator by the Saturday Evening Post, where his works were featured prominently.

Brown's works included illustrated stories of American authors such as F. Scott Fitzgerald, Irvin Cobb, J.P. McEvoy, and Sinclair Lewis. He also illustrated posters for the World War I war effort as well as book cover illustrations. His work is held in the permanent collections of several museums, including the Imperial War Museums, the Museum of Modern Art, the Delaware Art Museum, the Indianapolis Museum of Art, the Museum of Fine Arts, Boston, the University of Michigan Museum of Art, and the Dallas Museum of Art.

In 1964, Brown earned the unofficial title of Dean of American Illustrators and was inducted into the Illustrator's Hall of Fame by the American Society of Illustrators.
