= Tuppy Glossop =

Fictional character in P. G. Wodehouse stories

- Jeeves character
- Robert Daws as Tuppy Glossop
- First appearance: "Jeeves and the Yule-tide Spirit" (1927)
- Last appearance: Right Ho, Jeeves (1934)
- Created by: P. G. Wodehouse
- Portrayed by: Robert Daws; Ray Cooney; Edwin Apps and others

In-universe information
- Full name: Hildebrand Glossop
- Nickname: Tuppy
- Gender: Male
- Relatives: Sir Roderick Glossop (uncle); Honoria Glossop (cousin); Oswald Glossop (cousin)
- Nationality: Scottish

Hildebrand "Tuppy" Glossop is a recurring fictional character in the Jeeves stories by humorist P. G. Wodehouse. Tuppy is a member of the Drones Club, a friend of Bertie Wooster, and the fiancé of Angela Travers, Bertie's cousin.

== Life and character ==
Hildebrand "Tuppy" Glossop is the nephew of Sir Roderick Glossop and the cousin of Honoria Glossop. He has light hair, a Cheshire-cat grin, keen and piercing eyes, a high, squeaky voice, and somewhat resembles a bulldog in build and appearance. An Old Austinian and Drones Club member, Tuppy is a boyhood friend of Bertie Wooster, with whom he went to Oxford. In Right Ho, Jeeves, Bertie is surprised to learn that Tuppy is Scottish. Tuppy regularly plays tennis in the summer and football in the winter.

How Tuppy and Bertie became friends is unclear. In Jeeves and the Yule-tide Spirit, Bertie claims that he 'unfortunately' met Tuppy through Sir Roderick Glossop However, in Right ho, Jeeves Bertie claims to have gone to school with Tuppy. (When slandering Tuppy in Right ho, Jeeves, Bertie claims to have gone to school with Tuppy before Eton, but later claims they were at Oxford together.) This is strange, because in The Inimitable Jeeves, Sir Roderick and his family are entirely new to Bertie, except Honoria Glossop.

The origin of Tuppy's nickname is never explained, though it is not an uncommon nickname, generally being derived from "tuppence" (meaning "two pence").

Tuppy once played a practical joke on Bertie by tricking him into falling into the Drones Club swimming pool, an incident which Bertie references frequently. This occurred sometime before "Jeeves and the Yule-tide Spirit", in which Bertie describes the incident to Jeeves:

"One night after dinner at the Drones he betted me I wouldn't swing myself across the swimming-bath by the ropes and rings. I took him on and was buzzing along in great style until I came to the last ring. And then I found that this fiend in human shape had looped it back against the rail, thus leaving me hanging in the void with no means of getting ashore to my home and loved ones. There was nothing for it but to drop in the water."

Bertie seeks revenge on Tuppy in that story, and mentions in other stories that he was dressed in correct evening attire when he fell into the pool. Though Bertie later says he has forgiven Tuppy, he continues to reference the incident.

In "Jeeves and the Song of Songs", Tuppy, who is engaged to Bertie's favourite cousin, Angela Travers, leaves her for the opera singer Cora Bellinger. Bertie and Jeeves are asked by Bertie's Aunt Dahlia, who is Angela's mother, to make sure that he goes back to Angela. Jeeves is successful. Similarly, in "The Ordeal of Young Tuppy", Tuppy falls for the athletic Miss Dalgleish but ultimately returns to Angela. He plays rugby football in the story.

In Right Ho, Jeeves, Angela breaks the engagement because, when she told him that a shark had attacked her while she was aquaplaning in Cannes, Tuppy dismissed it as probably being only a flatfish that wanted to play. Tuppy and Angela reconcile by the end of the story.

In Much Obliged, Jeeves, Angela and Tuppy have not married after being engaged for two years, due to a lack of funds on Tuppy's part. Dahlia Travers decides that L. P. Runkle of Runkle Enterprises owes Tuppy money for Tuppy's late father's invention, a headache remedy called Runkle's Magic Midgets. This product has been extremely profitable for Runkle, while Tuppy's father did not make any profit on the invention apart from his regular salary. Ultimately, Jeeves manages to make Runkle pay Tuppy.

== Appearances ==
Tuppy appears in:

- Very Good, Jeeves (1930)
  - "Jeeves and the Yule-tide Spirit" (1927)
  - "Jeeves and the Song of Songs" (1929)
  - "The Ordeal of Young Tuppy" (1930)
- Right Ho, Jeeves (1934)

Tuppy is mentioned in:

- The Code of the Woosters (1938)
- Much Obliged, Jeeves (1971)
- Aunts Aren't Gentlemen (1974)

== Adaptations ==
Television

- In the 1965–1967 television series The World of Wooster, Tuppy was portrayed by Edwin Apps.
- In a 1974 episode of Comedy Playhouse adapted by David Climie from the Wodehouse story "The Reverent Wooing of Archibald", Tuppy Glossop was portrayed by John Leeson.
- In the 1975–1978 television series Wodehouse Playhouse, also adapted by David Climie, David Quilter portrayed a wealthy, monocle-wearing Drone named Tuppy Glossop who gives advice to Archibald Mulliner in series 2, episode 6, "The Code of the Mulliners", and helps Bingo Little in series 3, episode 5, "The Editor Regrets". He has nothing in common with the canonical Tuppy Glossop apart from his name and club membership.
- In the 1990–1993 television series Jeeves and Wooster, Robert Daws portrayed Tuppy. In the series, in addition to his other love interests from the original stories, Tuppy also falls in love with Pauline Stoker and Elizabeth Vickers, though he returns to Angela Travers in the end on each occasion. In the last episode of the series, he attempts to use a drain-clearing machine at Totleigh Towers, which did not occur in the original stories.

Radio

- In the 1956 BBC BBC Light Programme radio dramatisation of Right Ho, Jeeves, Tuppy was voiced by Richard Wattis.
- In the 1973–1981 series What Ho! Jeeves, Ray Cooney voiced Tuppy in Right Ho, Jeeves (1973), and Stephen Moore voiced Tuppy in "The Ordeal of Young Tuppy" (1976).
- In the 1988 BBC radio adaptation of Right Ho, Jeeves, Tuppy was voiced by Sean Arnold.

== Cultural reference ==
The name is mentioned in the Dad’s Army episode ‘We Know Our Onions’ (the radio version, at least) when Sgt. Wilson recalls that he’d had a drink with a sergeant in the Eastbourne Home Guard whose people knew Wilson’s people years before. “Anyway, he was an awfully nice chap, and he and his friend Tuppy Glossop…”

== See also ==
- List of Jeeves characters, an alphabetical list of Jeeves characters
- List of P. G. Wodehouse characters in the Jeeves stories, a categorized outline of Jeeves characters
- List of Jeeves and Wooster characters, a list of characters in the television series
