= Roderick Glossop =

Fictional character in P. G. Wodehouse stories

Sir Roderick Glossop
- Jeeves, Blandings Castle character
- Roger Brierley as Sir Roderick Glossop (right) in the television series Jeeves and Wooster
- First appearance: "Sir Roderick Comes to Lunch" (1922)
- Last appearance: Jeeves in the Offing (1960)
- Created by: P. G. Wodehouse
- Portrayed by: Paul Whitsun-Jones; Andrew Cruickshank; Roger Brierley and others

In-universe information
- Alias: Swordfish
- Nickname: Roddy
- Gender: Male
- Occupation: Psychiatrist
- Spouse: Lady Glossop née Blatherwick (deceased); Myrtle, Lady Chuffnell
- Children: Honoria Glossop (daughter); Oswald Glossop (son)
- Relatives: Tuppy Glossop (nephew)
- Nationality: British

Sir Roderick Glossop is a recurring fictional character in the comic novels and short stories of P. G. Wodehouse. Sometimes referred to as a "nerve specialist" or a "loony doctor", he is a prominent practitioner of psychiatry in Wodehouse's works, appearing in several Jeeves stories and in one Blandings Castle story.

Though he is initially antagonistic towards Bertie Wooster, they become friends in later stories.

== Inspiration ==
The character of Sir Roderick Glossop was inspired by Dr. Henry Crawford MacBryan, who operated a psychiatric nursing home in the hamlet of Ditteridge, in the parish of Box, Wiltshire, near Cheney House where the young Wodehouse spent some of his childhood with his aunts.

== Life and character ==
Sir Roderick Glossop is the father of Honoria Glossop and Oswald Glossop. He is first married to Lady Glossop, a friend of Bertie's Aunt Agatha, and later to Lady Chuffnell, aunt of "Chuffy", Lord Chuffnell. He went to school with Lord Emsworth, who states that Glossop was an unpleasant boy who had a nasty and superior manner. Glossop has a pleasant baritone voice, and as a penniless medical student, sang at smoking concerts. His residences are 6b Harley Street and Ditteredge Hall, Hampshire.

He is formally called a nerve specialist or a brain specialist, though Bertie thinks of him as a "high-priced loony-doctor". Even after they become friends, Bertie still refers to Glossop as "the eminent loony doctor". He is a well-known psychiatrist, and, according to Bertie, "practically every posh family in the country has called him in at one time or another". He is described as serious-minded by Bertie Wooster's Aunt Agatha, who tells Bertie that Sir Roderick is President of the West London branch of the National Anti-Gambling League, drinks no wine, disapproves of smoking, and, due to an impaired digestion, can only eat simple food. She also says that he does not approve of coffee, as he considers it "the root of half the nerve-trouble in the world."

When Bertie sees Glossop in "Sir Roderick Comes to Lunch", he describes Glossop as an "extraordinarily formidable old bird," stating:

He had a pair of shaggy eyebrows which gave his eyes a piercing look which was not at all the sort of thing a fellow wanted to encounter on an empty stomach. He was fairly tall and fairly broad, and he had the most enormous head, with practically no hair on it, which made it seem bigger and much more like the dome of St Paul's. I suppose he must have taken about a nine or something in hats. Shows what a rotten thing it is to let your brain develop too much.

In that story, Glossop has lunch with Bertie to judge whether or not Bertie is mentally sound and fit to marry Honoria. Incidents arise that lead him to render a negative judgment, especially when Glossop, who strongly dislikes cats, is surprised by three cats in Bertie's flat. This incident is often recounted in later stories, with the number of cats being exaggerated as twenty-three. In "Bingo and the Little Woman", Glossop corroborates a claim that Bertie is mentally unsound. These stories appear in The Inimitable Jeeves.

He forbids the marriage between Bertie's friend Charles "Biffy" Biffen and his daughter Honoria in "The Rummy Affair of Old Biffy", much to Biffy's relief. He also appears in "Without the Option". Both stories are collected in Carry On, Jeeves. In "Jeeves and the Yule-tide Spirit" (in Very Good, Jeeves), he is the unintended victim of a prank when Bertie punctures his hot water bottle. In this story, Glossop mentions that he is nervous about fires.

In Thank You, Jeeves, he has been a widower for two years, and wants to marry Myrtle, Lady Chuffnell. Glossop obtains the use of Chuffnell Hall as a clinic, funded by J. Washburn Stoker. In Jeeves in the Offing, he pretends to be a butler at Brinkley Court named Swordfish (the name being suggested by Bobbie Wickham) in order to surreptitiously observe one of the guests, Wilbert Cream, and judge his sanity. It is also stated in this novel that Glossop still runs the clinic at Chuffnell Regis, and that Myrtle has become Lady Glossop, suggesting that they are married. Glossop is mentioned in the last Jeeves short story, "Jeeves and the Greasy Bird".

Outside the Jeeves canon, Glossop appears in the Blandings Castle and Uncle Fred novel, Uncle Fred in the Springtime, in which he is impersonated by Pongo Twistleton's Uncle Fred at Blandings Castle. In Cocktail Time, he is a member of the Demosthenes Club, which is situated immediately opposite the Drones Club, and is briefly seen at the Demosthenes.

=== Relationship with Bertie Wooster ===
Though they are not friendly towards each other in the early stories, Glossop bonds with Bertie in Thank You, Jeeves (1934) when they both have to endure going about the countryside wearing blackface. As Bertie tells Jeeves, "From now on, there will always be a knife and fork for Bertram at the Glossop lair, and the same for Roddy chez Bertram".

Inconsistencies in the relationship between Bertie and Glossop arise in the later novel Jeeves in the Offing (1960), as they do not seem to be on terms of friendship in the beginning of the story. When Bertie learns his Aunt Dahlia is going to have lunch with Glossop, Bertie states that Glossop "was a man I would not have cared to lunch with myself". However, they become friends in Jeeves in the Offing, after they bond over their realization that they each stole biscuits from the school headmaster's study as children. They start addressing each other as "Bertie" and "Roddy".

Notably, in the 1965 short story "Jeeves and the Greasy Bird", Bertie tells Jeeves that he and "Roddy" are good friends, citing the ordeals they shared in Thank You, Jeeves. Sir Roderick has not yet married Lady Chuffnell in this story.

To explain why Bertie and Sir Roderick are not already friends at the start of Jeeves in the Offing, Wodehouse scholar J. H. C. Morris suggested that Bertie and Sir Roderick had an undisclosed quarrel sometime after Thank You, Jeeves and before Jeeves in the Offing, implying that "Jeeves and the Greasy Bird" occurs before this quarrel.

Bertie continues to regard Sir Roderick Glossop as a friend in Much Obliged, Jeeves (1971). He describes "Roddy" as one of his leading pals.

== Appearances ==
Roderick Glossop appears in:

- The Inimitable Jeeves (1923)
  - "Sir Roderick Comes to Lunch" (1922)
- Carry On, Jeeves (1925)
  - "The Rummy Affair of Old Biffy" (1924)
  - "Without the Option" (1925)
- Very Good, Jeeves (1930)
  - Jeeves and the Yule-tide Spirit (1927)
- Thank You, Jeeves (1934)
- Uncle Fred in the Springtime (1939)
- Jeeves in the Offing (1960)

He is mentioned in several stories, including:

- The Inimitable Jeeves (1923)
  - "Bingo and the Little Woman" (1922)
- Cocktail Time (1958)
- Plum Pie (1966)
  - "Jeeves and the Greasy Bird" (1965)
- A Pelican at Blandings (1969)
- Much Obliged, Jeeves (1971)

== Adaptations ==
=== Television ===
- In the 1965–1967 television series The World of Wooster, Sir Roderick Glossop was portrayed by Paul Whitsun-Jones.
- In the 1990–1993 television series Jeeves and Wooster, Glossop was portrayed in three episodes by Roger Brierley in series 1 and 2, and once by Philip Locke in series 4. Unlike in the original stories, Sir Roderick separates from his first wife and is not a widower. He goes to New York, where he becomes engaged to his American assistant, Myrtle Snap, but quickly finds her to be domineering and leaves her. He also develops a new treatment plan which he calls the "Glossop Method" and treats Lord Bittlesham.
- In the 2013–2014 television series Blandings, he was portrayed by Geoffrey McGivern in series 2, episode 1, "Throwing Eggs".

=== Radio ===
- In the 1973–1981 radio drama series What Ho! Jeeves, Sir Roderick Glossop was voiced by Andrew Cruickshank in an adaptation of The Inimitable Jeeves, and by John Graham in an adaptation of Thank You, Jeeves.
- Guy Siner voiced Sir Roderick Glossop in the 1998 L.A. Theatre Works radio adaptation of Thank You, Jeeves.

== See also ==
- List of Jeeves characters, an alphabetical list of Jeeves characters
- List of P. G. Wodehouse characters in the Jeeves stories, a categorized outline of Jeeves characters
- List of Jeeves and Wooster characters, a list of characters in the television series
