= Bingo Little =

Fictional character in P. G. Wodehouse stories

- Jeeves, Drones Club character
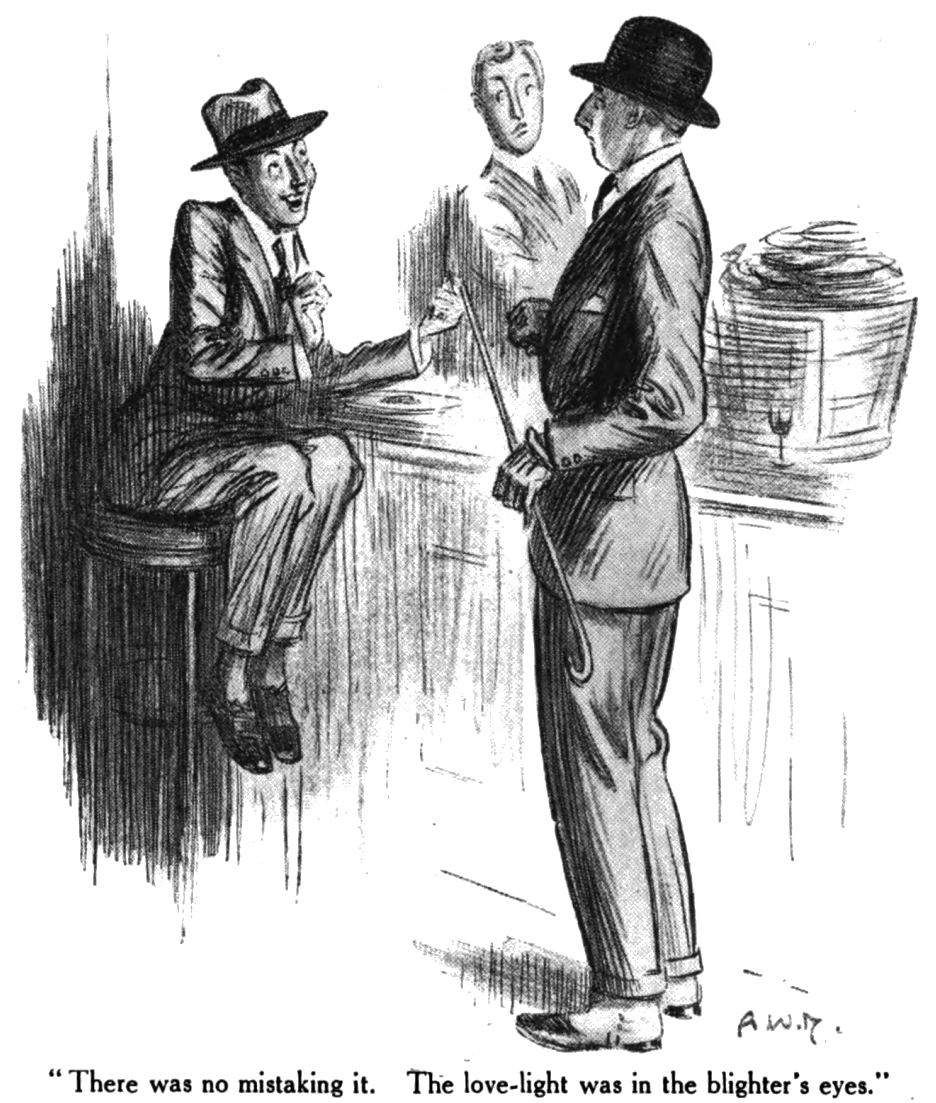
- Bingo Little (left) and Bertie Wooster, illustrated by A. Wallis Mills
- First appearance: "Jeeves in the Springtime" (1921)
- Last appearance: "Stylish Stouts" (1965)
- Created by: P. G. Wodehouse
- Portrayed by: Derek Nimmo; Michael Siberry; Pip Torrens and others

In-universe information
- Full name: Richard P. Little
- Nickname: Bingo
- Gender: Male
- Occupation: Tutor, later becomes editor of Wee Tots
- Spouse: Rosie M. Banks (wife)
- Children: Algernon Aubrey Little (son)
- Relatives: Mortimer Little, Lord Bittlesham (uncle)
- Nationality: British

Richard P. "Bingo" Little is a recurring fictional character in the comedic Jeeves and Drones Club stories of English writer P. G. Wodehouse, being a friend of Jeeves's master Bertie Wooster and a member of the Drones Club.

In his early appearances, Bingo, who has an impulsive and romantic nature, falls in love with numerous women in quick succession, generally pursuing an absurd scheme to woo his latest love interest and invariably causing problems for his pal Bertie. Eventually, Bingo marries Rosie M. Banks, and their married life is a happy one for the most part, though his proclivity for gambling sometimes gets him into trouble.

== Life and character ==
Richard P. "Bingo" Little is a longtime friend of Bertie Wooster. They were born in the same village a few days apart, and went together to kindergarten, preparatory school at Malvern House, secondary school at Eton College, and then to the University of Oxford, where Bingo obtained a degree of some sort. He often reminds Bertie that they were at school together when he wants Bertie's help.

Described by Bertie as "long and thin and hasn't had a superfluous ounce on him since we first met", Bingo is the only person other than Jeeves whom Bertie says has "finely-chiselled features". Bingo's loathing for country life is well known, and he generally avoids going to country houses when possible. He bets often on horse racing and is knowledgeable about novels based on the subject, including Pipped on the Post and Jenny, the Girl Jockey. He plays tennis, and in one story plays doubles with Bertie in a local tennis tournament.

Initially, Bingo is largely dependent on an allowance from his uncle Lord Bittlesham, though Bingo sometimes supplements his income with tutoring jobs. He eventually marries the novelist Rosie M. Banks, and through her connections, becomes the editor of Wee Tots, a publication for families and children. Bingo and Rosie live in St. John's Wood, and later just off Wimbledon Common. Bingo inherits a substantial income and a country house from an Uncle Wilberforce, though Bingo still finds himself short of funds later on, so it is possible that Bingo spent his inheritance in some way, that Rosie controls the money Bingo inherited, or the inheritance might have not been as valuable as was first thought.

According to Bertie, Bingo is known for his romantic nature, which began at school where he had the greatest collection of actresses' photographs, and which was a byword at Oxford. As Bertie notes in the story in which Bingo first appears, "Jeeves in the Springtime", Bingo is especially prone to fall in love in the spring, which acts on him like magic. Bingo falls in love on a regular basis throughout The Inimitable Jeeves, and each time, he enthusiastically tells Bertie about whoever he has fallen in love with; Bertie notes that Bingo always reminds him of "the hero of a musical comedy who takes the centre of the stage, gathers the boys round him in a circle, and tells them all about his love at the top of his voice".

The women he falls in love with form a diverse group, and include the waitress Mabel, who gives Bingo a crimson tie decorated with horseshoes ("Jeeves in the Springtime"); Honoria Glossop, the formidable daughter of Sir Roderick Glossop ("Scoring off Jeeves"); Daphne Braythwayt, a friend of Honoria ("Scoring off Jeeves"); Charlotte Corday Rowbotham, a revolutionary ("Comrade Bingo"); Lady Cynthia Wickhammersley, a family friend of Bertie's ("The Great Sermon Handicap"); and Mary Burgess, niece of the Rev. Francis Heppenstall ("The Metropolitan Touch"). Bingo is usually rejected within a short amount of time, and generally the girl gets engaged to someone else. In the last short story in The Inimitable Jeeves, "Bingo and the Little Woman", Bingo falls in love again when he sees Rosie M. Banks at the Senior Liberal Club, where Rosie is working as a waitress to gather material for her next book. To Bertie's surprise, Bingo and Rosie get married.

In "Clustering Round Young Bingo" (in Carry On, Jeeves), Bingo must reluctantly give up his gifted chef, Anatole. It is clear in this story that Bertie and Bingo are still friends after Bingo's marriage, and that Bertie has also become Rosie's friend. Bertie considers himself an old friend of the family, and mentions that there is usually a photograph of himself on a table in the Littles' drawing room, next to photographs of Bingo, Rosie and Lord Bittlesham.

Although the Littles' family life is happy for the most part, Rosie does not approve of Bingo's gambling habits and restricts him to an allowance. Occasionally, Bingo gets into trouble after losing money on wagers and tries to somehow make the money back while trying to keep Rosie from finding out. This happens in "Jeeves and the Impending Doom", in which Bingo loses money on a horse race and must get a job as a tutor for Thomas "Thos" Gregson, the troublesome son of Bertie's Aunt Agatha. This story appears in the collection Very Good, Jeeves. In another story in the same collection,"Jeeves and the Old School Chum", Bingo's well-being is threatened by Rosie's old school friend, Laura Pyke, who tries to dictate what Bingo should eat.

Bingo attends Gussie Fink-Nottle's engagement dinner in the novel The Code of the Woosters. In The Mating Season, Bertie tells Corky Pirbright about Bingo becoming an editor of Wee Tots, "a journal for the nursery and the home", and says that Bingo and Rosie have had a baby. Rosie and Bingo have their baby, named Algernon Aubrey Little, in the second year of their marriage.

Also in The Mating Season, Bertie says that Bingo generally changes the subject nervously when the subject of his wife's writing is brought up. However, in Jeeves and the Feudal Spirit, Bertie mentions that Rosie frequently sends Bingo to places to take notes for her, to help with atmosphere in her writing.

== Appearances ==
Bingo is featured in the following short stories:

- in The Inimitable Jeeves (1923)
  - "Jeeves in the Springtime" (1921) – Jeeves
  - "Scoring off Jeeves" (1922) – Jeeves
  - "Comrade Bingo" (1922) – Jeeves
  - "The Great Sermon Handicap" (1922) – Jeeves
  - "The Purity of the Turf" (1922) – Jeeves
  - "The Metropolitan Touch" (1922) – Jeeves
  - "Bingo and the Little Woman" (1922) – Jeeves
- in Carry On, Jeeves (1925)
  - "Clustering Round Young Bingo" – Jeeves
- in Very Good, Jeeves (1930)
  - "Jeeves and the Impending Doom" (1926) – Jeeves
  - "Jeeves and the Old School Chum" (1930) – Jeeves
- in Eggs, Beans and Crumpets (1940)
  - "All's Well with Bingo" (1937) – Drones
  - "Bingo and the Peke Crisis" (1937) – Drones
  - "The Editor Regrets" (1939) – Drones
  - "Sonny Boy" (1939) – Drones
- in A Few Quick Ones (1959)
  - "The Word in Season" (1940) – Drones
  - "Leave it to Algy" (1954, rewrite of "The Ordeal of Bingo Little") – Drones
- in Nothing Serious (1950)
  - "The Shadow Passes" (1950) – Drones
  - "Bramley Is So Bracing" (1939) – Drones, stars Freddie Widgeon
- in Plum Pie (1966)
  - "Bingo Bans the Bomb" (1965) – Drones
  - "Stylish Stouts" (1965, also recycled as "The Great Fat Uncle Contest") – Drones

Bingo is mentioned in several stories, including:

- The Code of the Woosters (1938) – Jeeves
- Uncle Fred in the Springtime (1939) – Blandings
- Joy in the Morning (1946) – Jeeves
- The Mating Season (1949) – Jeeves
- Jeeves and the Feudal Spirit (1954) – Jeeves
- Pearls, Girls and Monty Bodkin (1972) – Drone Monty Bodkin

== Adaptations ==
Television

- Derek Nimmo portrayed Bingo in the 1965–1967 BBC One television series The World of Wooster.
- John Alderton portrayed Bingo in the 1975–1978 television series Wodehouse Playhouse, season 3, episode 5, "The Editor Regrets" (1978).
- In the 1990–1993 television series Jeeves and Wooster, Bingo was portrayed by Michael Siberry in series 1 and 2, and by Pip Torrens in series 3 and 4.

Stage

- Bingo was portrayed by David Wood in the 1975 musical Jeeves.
- In the London premiere of By Jeeves, the 1996 rewrite of the previous musical, Bingo was played by Nicholas Haverson.
- Though Bingo does not appear in the 2013 play Jeeves and Wooster in Perfect Nonsense, in which Bertie Wooster recounts the events of The Code of the Woosters, Bingo is the reason Bertie puts on the play. Bertie explains at the start of the play that he told Bingo about the weekend he recently spent at Totleigh Towers, and Bingo said he should tell the story on the stage.

Film

- Don Stephenson portrayed Bingo in the 2001 recording of the musical By Jeeves.

Radio

- In the 1940 radio drama episode "Leave It to Jeeves" (in the CBS radio series Forecast), Bingo Little was voiced by Donald Morrison.
- In the 1973–1981 radio drama series What Ho! Jeeves, Bingo was voiced by Jonathan Cecil.

== See also ==
- List of Jeeves characters, an alphabetical list of Jeeves characters
- List of P. G. Wodehouse characters in the Jeeves stories, a categorized outline of Jeeves characters
- List of Jeeves and Wooster characters, a list of characters in the television series
