= The Mating Season (novel) =

1949 novel by P. G. Wodehouse

- First edition (UK)
- Author: P. G. Wodehouse
- Language: English
- Series: Jeeves
- Genre: Comic novel
- Publisher: Herbert Jenkins (UK); Didier & Co. (US)
- Publication date: 9 September 1949 (UK); 29 November 1949 (US)
- Publication place: United Kingdom
- Media type: Print
- Preceded by: Joy in the Morning
- Followed by: Ring for Jeeves

The Mating Season is a novel by P. G. Wodehouse, first published in the United Kingdom on 9 September 1949 by Herbert Jenkins, London, and in the United States on November 29, 1949, by Didier & Co., New York.

Featuring the well-intentioned Bertie Wooster and his resourceful valet Jeeves, the novel takes place at Deverill Hall, where Esmond Haddock lives with his five overcritical aunts. The story concerns the relationships of several couples, most notably Gussie Fink-Nottle and Madeline Bassett, Esmond Haddock and Corky Potter-Pirbright, and Catsmeat Potter-Pirbright and Gertrude Winkworth.

== Plot ==
On the cue "five aunts" I had given at the knees a trifle, for the thought of being confronted with such a solid gaggle of aunts, even if those of another, was an unnerving one. Reminding myself that in this life it is not aunts that matter but the courage which one brings to them, I pulled myself together.

— Bertie is told by Jeeves about Esmond Haddock's five aunts

Bertie's overbearing Aunt Agatha orders him to go to Deverill Hall, King's Deverill, Hants., to stay with some friends of hers and perform in the village concert. Jeeves, who knows about Deverill Hall because his uncle Charlie Silversmith is the butler there, says that Esmond Haddock, his aunt Dame Daphne Winkworth, four other aunts, and Dame Daphne's daughter Gertrude Winkworth live there. Bertie's friend Gussie Fink-Nottle will also go there. Gussie is upset because his fiancée Madeline Bassett was supposed to accompany him, but had to visit a friend, Hilda Gudgeon, instead.

Another friend of Bertie's, Catsmeat Potter-Pirbright, an actor, wants to marry Gertrude. However, the aunts disapprove of actors. Catsmeat thinks Esmond is wooing Gertrude and asks Bertie to keep them apart. In exchange, Catsmeat will keep Gussie from brooding about Madeline; Bertie does not want Gussie and Madeline to split up because Madeline is resolved to marry Bertie if she does not marry Gussie. Bertie is also visited by Catsmeat's sister, Corky, who is arranging the village concert and wants Bertie to play Pat in a comedic Pat-and-Mike crosstalk act. Corky loves Esmond but won't marry him until he stands up to his domineering aunts, who disapprove of Corky because she is an actress. She believes Esmond has moved on to Gertrude. While drunk, Catsmeat makes Gussie wade through the Trafalgar Square fountain, and Gussie is sentenced to fourteen days in jail. To keep Madeline from learning about this, Jeeves suggests Bertie stay at Deverill Hall pretending to be Gussie. Bertie does so, taking Corky's dog Sam Goldwyn (a reference to film producer Samuel Goldwyn) with him at Corky's request.

At Deverill Hall, Bertie ("Gussie") learns that Esmond is in love with Corky and not Gertrude. Esmond hopes to win applause at the concert by singing a hunting song to impress Corky. Catsmeat, wanting to be near Gertrude, comes to the Hall pretending to be Bertie's valet Meadowes. The next day, Gussie, who was let off with a fine, arrives, pretending to be Bertie, along with Jeeves, who acts as "Bertie's" valet. Jeeves, believing that applause at the concert would give Esmond the courage to defy his aunts and marry Corky, starts assembling a claque. Gussie will take Bertie's place in the crosstalk act, with Catsmeat as his partner. Bertie will take Gussie's place by reciting Christopher Robin poems.

Catsmeat tells Bertie that Bertie's Aunt Agatha is coming to the house. Following a plan from Jeeves, Catsmeat asks Corky to invite Aunt Agatha's young son Thomas to visit her; Thomas, a fan of Corky's, runs away from school to see her, and Aunt Agatha cancels her trip when she learns her son has disappeared. Catsmeat tries to cheer up Queenie, the Hall's parlourmaid, who is distraught after ending her engagement to the local policeman Constable Dobbs, because he is an atheist.

Gussie, who has fallen for Corky, writes to Madeline ending their engagement. Bertie intercepts the letter, despite briefly running into Madeline and Hilda, and returns to King's Deverill. Thomas has arrived. He has a rubber cosh and hopes to hit Constable Dobbs, since Dobbs arrested Corky's dog Sam after Sam bit him. Silversmith announces that Queenie, his daughter, is engaged to Catsmeat ("Meadowes"); Queenie had to tell her father they were engaged after he saw Catsmeat trying to comfort her with a kiss.

Gussie and Catsmeat, both despondent, perform miserably at the concert. Esmond is very successful. Bertie, having forgotten the Christopher Robin poems, consults Jeeves, who has taken away Thomas's cosh. They get Esmond to read the poems. Gussie leaves to retrieve Sam for Corky while Dobbs is at the concert. When Jeeves learns that Dobbs has gone home early, Jeeves and Bertie try to stop Gussie. Sam is freed and picked up by Corky. Gussie, chased by Dobbs, climbs a tree, and Dobbs waits below. Jeeves knocks Dobbs unconscious from behind using the cosh. After his ordeal, Gussie's affections turn from Corky back to Madeline.

Esmond and Corky become engaged. Dobbs claims he has become religious after being knocked out by a thunderbolt and reconciles with Queenie. Dobbs is also looking for "Bertie" for taking Sam Goldwyn, but Jeeves provides an alibi for Bertie. Dobbs then assumes it was Catsmeat who stole the dog; as Jeeves predicted, Gertrude rushes to defend Catsmeat. Corky reveals Catsmeat is her brother. Esmond, an influential Justice of the Peace, makes Dobbs drop the case. The aunts disapprove, but Esmond stands up to them. Aunt Agatha followed Thomas and is now waiting downstairs. Jeeves advises that Bertie escape by climbing down a water pipe, but Bertie, inspired by Esmond's example, goes to face her.

== Style ==
One of the stylistic devices Wodehouse uses for comic effect is exaggerated imagery in similes and metaphors. For instance, Bertie Wooster says of Esmond Haddock's five aunts: "As far as the eye could reach, I found myself gazing on a surging sea of aunts". He is alarmed to be: "trapped in a den of slavering aunts, lashing their tails and glaring at you out of their red eyes." Phrases are also sometimes used in the function of another part of speech, as in chapter 2: "I too-badded".

Original word formations are created with familiar prefixes and suffixes; for example, to "de-dog the premises" (chapter 24) is a variation on the pattern of de-louse or de-bunk. Wodehouse occasionally derives words from phrases using suffixation. An example of this can be seen in chapter 20: "the aunts raised their eyebrows with a good deal of To-what-are-we-indebted-for-the-honour-of-this-visitness".

Wodehouse also uses puns to create humour. For example, there is a pun based on the pair of homonyms ma and mar in British English in chapter 8. Bertie Wooster asks Jeeves:

"What's that thing of Shakespeare's about someone having an eye like Mother's?"
"An eye like Mars, to threaten and command, is possibly the quotation for which you are groping, sir."

Bertie and Jeeves often quote various literary sources. These quotations are frequently rendered with comic changes, such as when a quotation is rephrased with slang words or used in an unusual context. Another way Wodehouse varies allusions is to break them up with dialogue. This occurs when Shakespeare's The Merchant of Venice is alluded to in chapter 8, when Bertie asks Jeeves why the judge let Gussie off with a fine:

"Possibly the reflection that the quality of mercy is not strained, sir."
"You mean it droppeth as the gentle rain from heaven?"
"Precisely, sir. Upon the place beneath. His worship would no doubt have taken into consideration the fact that it blesseth him that gives and him that takes and becomes the throned monarch better than his crown."
I mused. Yes, there was something in that.

Another source of humour appearing multiple times in the Jeeves stories is Bertie's searching for the right item of vocabulary, often with Jeeves supplying the correct word. An example of this occurs when Bertie is speaking with Jeeves in chapter 8:

"Then what we've got to do is to strain every nerve to see that he makes a hit. What are those things people have?"
"Sir?"
"Opera singers and people like that."
"You mean a claque, sir?"
"That's right. The word was on the tip of my tongue."

Like Bertie Wooster, Catsmeat Potter-Pirbright is a member of the Drones Club, which Wodehouse uses as an "inexhaustible source of young masculine lead-characters". Bertie says of Catsmeat: "Today he is the fellow managers pick first when they have a Society comedy to present and want someone for "Freddie", the lighthearted friend of the hero, carrying the second love interest". In fact, Catsmeat is given the "second love interest" in the novel.

== Background ==
The book's title comes from a statement made in the novel by Catsmeat that it is springtime, the mating season, "when, as you probably know, a livelier iris gleams upon the burnished dove and a young man's fancy lightly turns to thoughts of love", which is a reference to the poem "Locksley Hall" by Alfred Tennyson.

At the time of writing there was bad blood between Wodehouse and fellow author A. A. Milne. The book included several satirical jibes aimed at Milne, for instance after Bertie (pressured by Madeline Bassett) agrees to recite Christopher Robin poems at the village concert, he laments: "A fellow who comes on a platform and starts reciting about Christopher Robin going hoppity-hoppity-hop (or alternatively saying his prayers) does not do so from sheer wantonness but because he is a helpless victim of circumstances beyond his control."

According to a letter Wodehouse wrote to his granddaughter on 27 March 1946, Wodehouse began working on the novel in 1942. One of his ideas for the novel was for Bertie to take Stilton Cheesewright's place at a country house after the quick-tempered Stilton is arrested for getting into a fight. However, Stilton is let off with a fine, and he comes to the house pretending to be Bertie. Generally, the role Wodehouse describes in the letter was performed by Gussie Fink-Nottle instead of Stilton in the final novel.

== Publication history ==
The first American edition of The Mating Season included ten illustrations by Hal McIntosh. McIntosh also illustrated the dust wrapper.

In addition to being published as a novel, the story was printed in the Canadian magazine, Star Weekly, on 12 November 1949, and in the Long Island Sunday Press, the Sunday edition of the Long Island Daily Press, on 18 December 1949.

== Reception ==
- The New York Times (4 December 1949): "Wooster is in the sauce again. And Jeeves, his stately butler, quoting bits from "The Oxford Book of English Verse" by the yard, is busy getting him—and all his loony friends—out once more. On this occasion the scene is Deverill Hall, a pre-Evelyn-Waugh period country house that Bertie has been invited to visit on the flimsiest pretexts and with the most cheerfully disastrous results. In order to help along one love affair, Bertie is forced to pretend that he is another guest, and in less time than you can say 'This reminds me a lot of standard-brand impersonations and mistaken identity plots,' several more people have got into the act, with the expected, and relentlessly unexpected, results".
- John Cournos, The Saturday Review (31 December 1949): "By now all readers know what to expect of 'a hilarious new Jeeves novel,' as the publishers put it; and they are getting it in full measure. Wodehouse has a way with him; he has made an art of the gag and the wisecrack, and hash of realism. … Five—no less than five—scheming aunts preside over the destinies of the manor house, and their function seems to be to direct Cupid's arrows according to their own notions, which are not always the notions of the several young people concerned. True love meets with continued calamities until Jeeves steps in and, with his inimitable skill, throws enchanting Corky into the arms of Esmond, Madeline into Gussie's, etc. And, as the jacket says, 'there are no lonely hearts after the Mating Season'".
- In 2014, Susan Hill listed The Mating Season as one of her three top reads, stating: "I need to have a book guaranteed to make me laugh at any time, anywhere. This does. But he was an English prose master too – it is both richly funny froth and bubble, and exemplary writing. I'd kill to write half as well".

== Adaptations ==
=== Television ===
The story was adapted into the Jeeves and Wooster episodes "Bertie Takes Gussie's Place At Deverill Hall" and "Sir Watkyn Bassett's Memoirs", which first aired on 19 and 26 April 1992.

=== Radio ===
The Mating Season was adapted into a radio drama in 1975 as part of the series What Ho! Jeeves starring Michael Hordern as Jeeves and Richard Briers as Bertie Wooster.
