= What Ho! Jeeves =

BBC radio drama series, 1973–1981

- Cover of Jeeves & Wooster: The Collected Radio Dramas, featuring most episodes
- Genre: Comedy
- Running time: 30 or 45 minutes
- Country of origin: United Kingdom
- Language(s): English
- Home station: BBC Radio 4
- Starring: Michael Hordern; Richard Briers
- Written by: Chris Miller and Richard Usborne, adapted from the works of P. G. Wodehouse
- Produced by: David Hatch; Peter Titheridge; Simon Brett
- Original release: 5 June 1973 – 7 January 1981
- No. of episodes: 54

What Ho! Jeeves (sometimes written What Ho, Jeeves!) is a series of radio dramas based on some of the Jeeves short stories and novels written by P. G. Wodehouse, starring Michael Hordern as the titular Jeeves and Richard Briers as Bertie Wooster.

The stories were adapted for radio by Chris Miller, except the last two novels featured in the series, which were dramatised by Richard Usborne. The series was first broadcast from 1973 to 1981 on BBC Radio 4.

== Production ==
The novels were adapted into several episodes. Each episode is approximately 30 minutes long, except for the episodes adapted from Thank You, Jeeves and The Mating Season, which are each about 45 minutes long.

"The Ordeal of Young Tuppy" and Joy in the Morning episodes were produced by Simon Brett. The Thank You, Jeeves and The Mating Season episodes were produced by Peter Titheridge. The episodes adapted from The Inimitable Jeeves, The Code of the Woosters, Jeeves and the Feudal Spirit, and Stiff Upper Lip, Jeeves were produced by David Hatch.

Six of the dramatized books are included in the audio collection Jeeves & Wooster: The Collected Radio Dramas, published by BBC Books in 2013. Some episodes occasionally air on BBC Radio 4 Extra.

== Main cast ==
- Bertie Wooster — Richard Briers
- Jeeves — Michael Hordern
- Bingo Little — Jonathan Cecil
- Aunt Agatha — Joan Sanderson
- Honoria Glossop — Miriam Margolyes
- Sir Roderick Glossop — Andrew Cruickshank (1973), John Graham (1975)
- Aunt Dahlia — Vivian Pickles
- Gussie Fink-Nottle — Rex Garner (1973), David Valla (1975), Jonathan Cecil (1980)
- Madeline Bassett — Bridget Armstrong (1973), Aimi MacDonald (1980)
- Tuppy Glossop — Ray Cooney (1973), Stephen Moore (1976)
- Roderick Spode (later the Earl of Sidcup) — James Villiers (1973), Paul Eddington (1980)
- Lady Florence Craye — Bronwen Williams (1978), Liza Goddard (1979))
- Sir Watkyn Bassett – Patrick Cargill (1973), John Le Mesurier (1980)
- Stephanie "Stiffy" Byng – Miriam Margolyes (1973), Denise Coffey (1980)

== Episode list ==
The series features eight multipart adaptations. A standalone episode adapted from the short story, "The Ordeal of Young Tuppy" (1930), was also aired, and first broadcast on 27 December 1976.

=== The Inimitable Jeeves ===
Adapted from The Inimitable Jeeves (1923). The cast included Ronald Fraser as Mortimer Little, Maurice Denham as the Rev. Heppenstall, Jonathan Lynn and David Jason as Claude and Eustace, and Edwin Apps as Steggles.

Episode	Title	First broadcast
1	Jeeves Exerts the Old Cerebellum	5 June 1973
2	Pearls Mean Tears	14 June 1973
3	Honoria Glossop	21 June 1973
4	The Startling Dressiness of a Lift Attendant	28 June 1973
5	Comrade Bingo	5 July 1973
6	The Great Sermon Handicap	12 July 1973
7	The Purity of the Turf	17 July 1973
8	The Metropolitan Touch	24 July 1973
9	The Delayed Exit of Claude and Eustace	31 July 1973
10	Bingo and the Little Woman	7 August 1973

=== Right Ho, Jeeves ===
Adapted from Right Ho, Jeeves (1934). The cast included John Graham as Uncle Tom and Anatole, and Jennie Goossens as Angela.

Episode	Title	First broadcast
1	Jeeves Loses His Grip	14 August 1973
2	Aunt Dahlia	21 August 1973
3	Anatole Is Insulted	30 August 1973
4	Getting Gussie Going	4 September 1973
5	The Roasting of Tuppy Glossop	11 September 1973
6	Gussie Presents the Prizes	20 September 1973
7	An Awful Doom	25 September 1973
8	Jeeves Finds the Key	4 October 1973

=== The Code of the Woosters ===
Adapted from The Code of the Woosters (1938). The cast included Douglas Blackwell as Harold Pinker and Tony McEwan as PC Oates.

Episode	Title	First broadcast
1	The Silver Cow Creamer	9 October 1973
2	The Small Leather-Covered Notebook	16 October 1973
3	The Plot Thickens	23 October 1973
4	Spode's Fangs Are Drawn	30 October 1973
5	Strange Behaviour of a Curate	6 November 1973
6	The Course of True Love	13 November 1973
7	A Wrongful Arrest	20 November 1973

=== Thank You, Jeeves ===
Adapted from Thank You, Jeeves (1934). The cast included Clive Francis as Lord Chuffnell, Connie Booth as Pauline Stoker, Jo Manning-Wilson as Seabury, Blain Fairman as J. Washburn Stoker, John Dunbar as Sergeant Voules, John Bull as Constable Dobson, and Alaric Cotter as Brinkley.

Episode	Title	First broadcast
1	Chuffnell Regis	2 July 1975
2	Sinister Behaviour of a Yacht Owner	9 July 1975
3	The Butter Situation	16 July 1975
4	Jeeves Finds the Way	23 July 1975

=== The Mating Season ===
Adapted from The Mating Season (1949). The cast included James Villiers as Esmond Haddock, Jo Kendall as Corky Pirbright, Kenneth Fortescue as Catsmeat Pirbright, Miriam Margoyles as Dame Daphne Winkworth and Hilda Gudgeon, John Dunbar as Silversmith, and Antony Higginson as the Rev. Sydney Pirbright and Constable Dobbs.

Episode	Title	First broadcast
1	Deverill Hall	30 July 1975
2	The Great Web	6 August 1975
3	Amorousness of a Newt Fancier	13 August 1975
4	The Village Concert	20 August 1975
5	Reunited Hearts	27 August 1975

=== Joy in the Morning ===
Adapted from Joy in the Morning (1946). The cast included Peter Woodthorpe as Lord Worplesdon, Jonathan Cecil as Boko Fittleworth, Denise Bryer as Edwin the Boy Scout, Rosalind Adams as Nobby Hopwood, and Michael Kilgarriff as Stilton Cheesewright.

Episode	Title	First broadcast
1	Florence Craye	9 January 1978
2	Steeple Bumpleigh	16 January 1978
3	Tribulations of an Uncle By Marriage	23 January 1978
4	Sundry Happenings in a Garden	1 February 1978
5	Schemes and Ruses	8 February 1978
6	Fancy Dress	13 February 1978
7	Jeeves Sails Into Action	22 February 1978

=== Jeeves and the Feudal Spirit ===
Adapted from Jeeves and the Feudal Spirit (1954). The cast included James Villiers as Stilton Cheesewright, Jonathan Cecil as Percy Gorringe, Norman Bird as L. G. Trotter, Diana King as Mrs Trotter, Ann Davies as Daphne Dolores Morehead, Liza Goddard as Lady Florence Crayne and David Tate as Stebbings.

Episode	Title	First broadcast
1	The New Moustache	21 May 1979
2	Ephraim Gadsby, Jailbird	28 May 1979
3	Dark Doings at Brinkley	4 June 1979
4	Bedrooms, Burglars and Broken Troths	11 June 1979
5	A Man's Best Friend Is His Cosh	18 June 1979
6	Jeeves, Mastermind	25 June 1979

=== Stiff Upper Lip, Jeeves ===
Adapted from Stiff Upper Lip, Jeeves (1963). The cast included Douglas Blackwell as the Rev. Harold Pinker, Ann Davies as Emerald Stoker, Ronald Fraser as Major Plank, Percy Edwards as the dog Bartholomew. and Graham Faulkner as Constable Oates.

Episode	Title	First broadcast
1	The Menace of Totleigh Towers	3 December 1980
2	Upstairs, Downstairs and Bumps in the Night	10 December 1980
3	Bartholomew, Blackmail and Barefaced Lies	17 December 1980
4	Spode Is Unsuccessful	24 December 1980
5	Black Eyes and Bloody Noses	2 January 1981
6	Game, Set and Match to Jeeves	7 January 1981
