= Arthur Wallis Mills =

British artist (1878-1940)

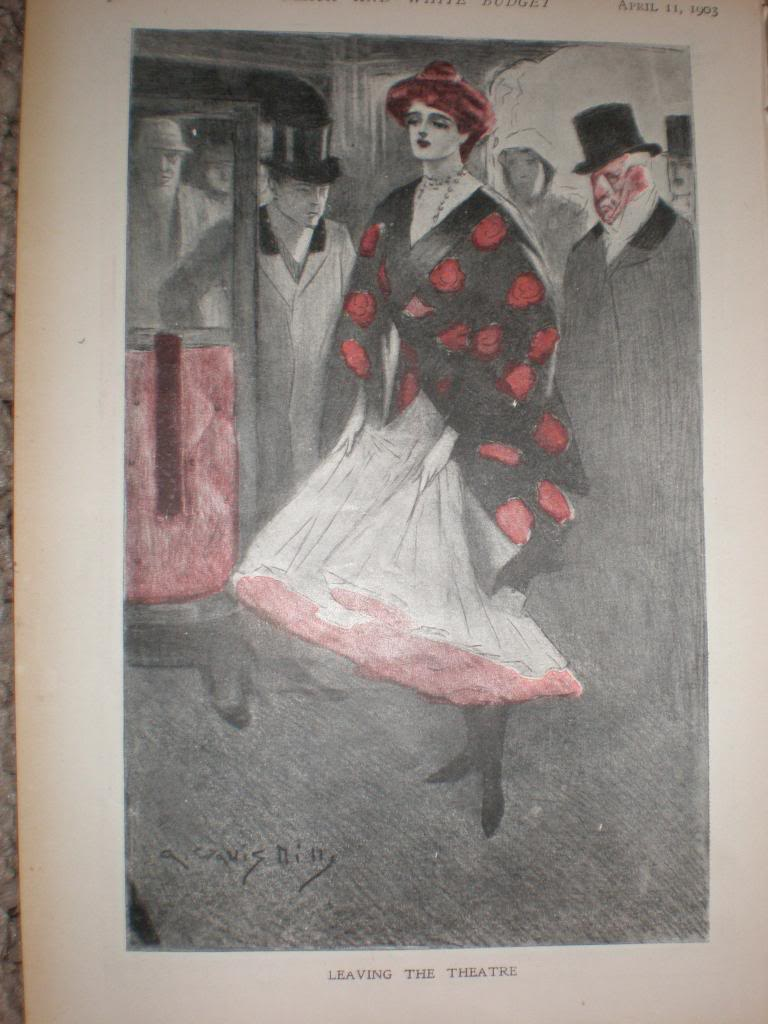
Photograph of original artwork by Arthur Wallis Mills for The Black and White Illustrated Budget, 1903

Arthur Wallis Mills (often abbreviated A. Wallis Mills, as well as A. W. Mills) (1878–1940) was a British artist. As well as traditional art forms, Mills also produced artwork and occasional cartoons for Punch Magazine, The Strand Magazine, The Humourist, The Black and White Illustrated Budget and The Royal Magazine in the United Kingdom as well as The Wanganui Chronicle in New Zealand. He also illustrated A Cabinet Secret (Guy Boothby, 1901), the 1908 edition of The Novels of Jane Austen in Ten Volumes, The Zincali - An account of the gypsies of Spain (George Borrow, 1841) and The Red Book of Heroes (Andrew Lang, 1909).

Mills illustrated many of P. G. Wodehouse's stories in magazines, including Indiscretions of Archie (1920–1921), Leave It to Psmith (1923), and 15 of P. G. Wodehouse's Jeeves short stories in The Strand Magazine, the first being "Jeeves in the Springtime" (1921). He illustrated more Jeeves short stories for their original UK magazine publications than any other artist.

== Artwork ==
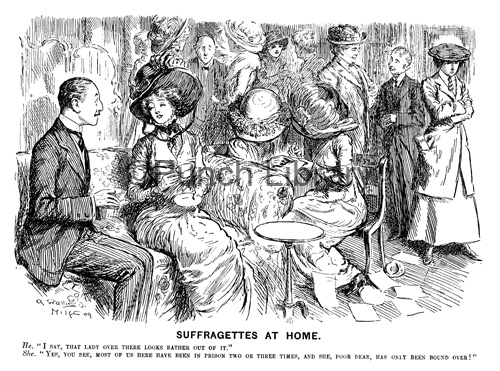
Suffragettes at Home for Punch Magazine, published 14 April 1909.

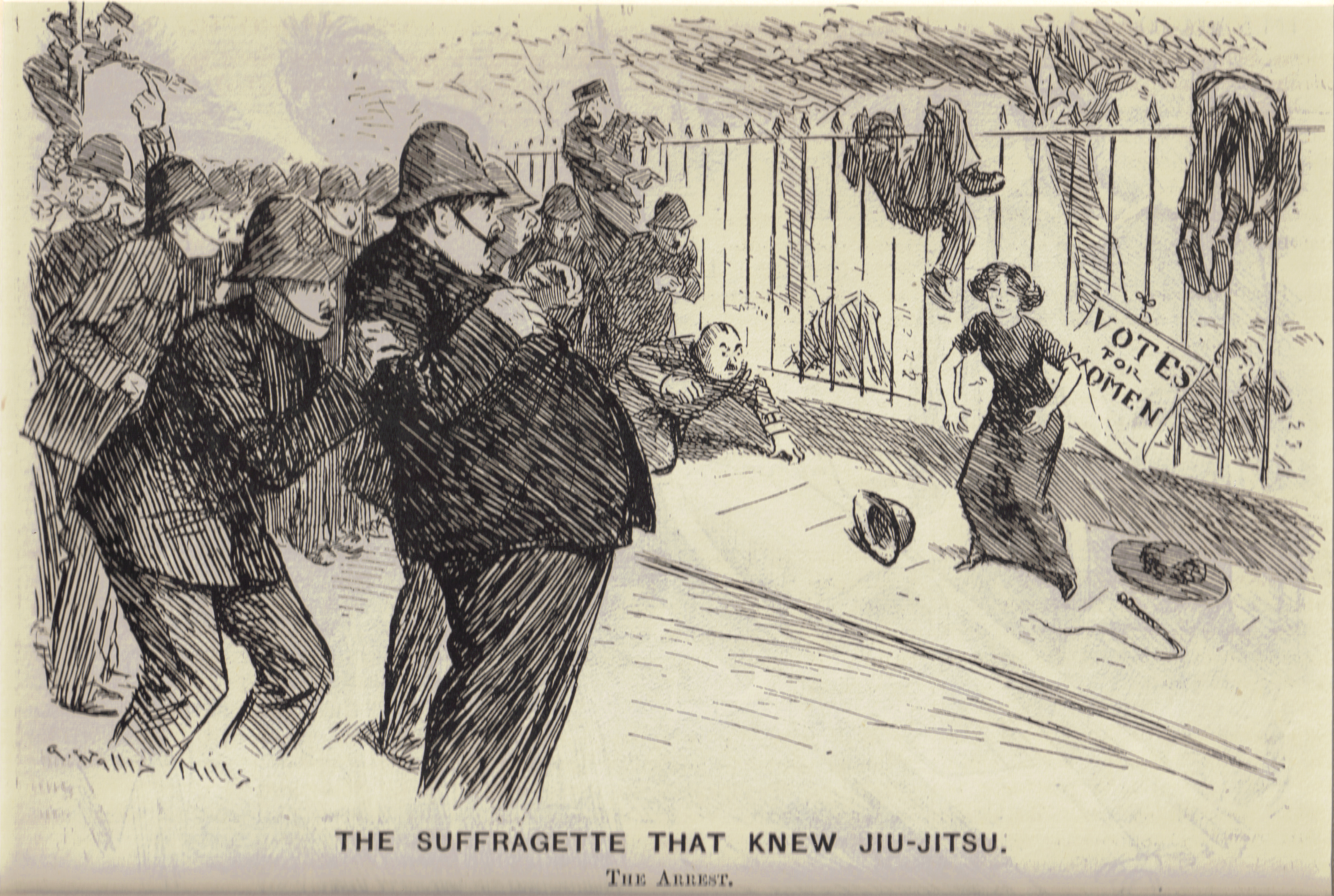
The Suffragette that Knew Jiu-Jitsu. The Arrest. (Edith Margaret Garrud) By Arthur Wallis Mills, originally published 1910 for Punch Magazine and The Wanganui Chronicle.

Illustration of Bertie Wooster and Jeeves for P. G. Wodehouse's short story "Jeeves in the Springtime", published in The Strand Magazine in December 1921.
