= The Inimitable Jeeves =

1923 short story collection by P. G. Wodehouse

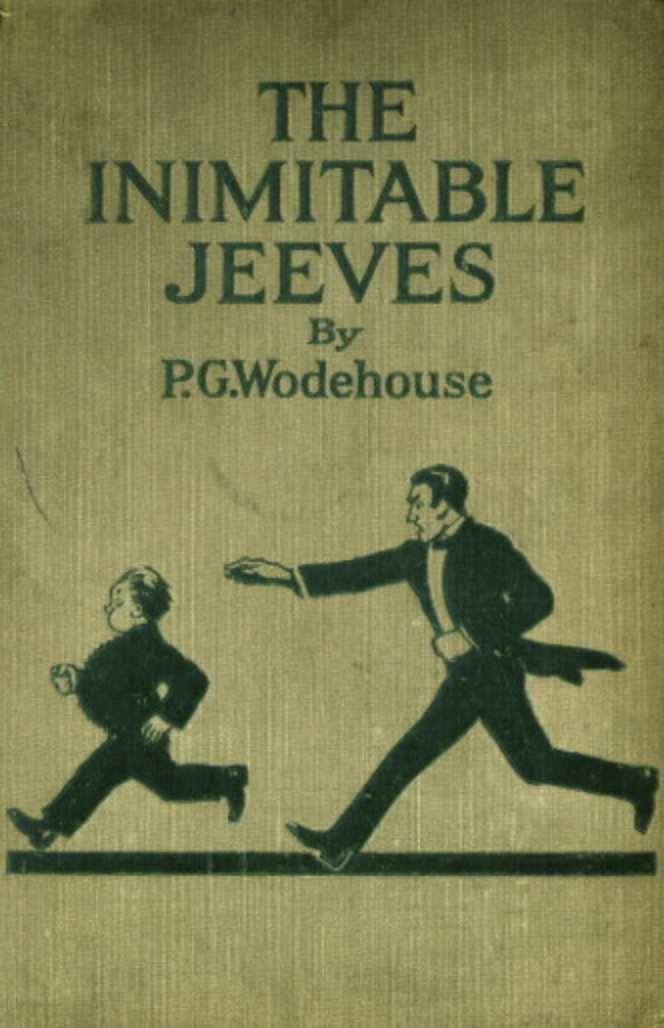
- First edition
- Author: P. G. Wodehouse
- Language: English
- Series: Jeeves
- Genre: Comedy
- Publisher: Herbert Jenkins (UK); George H. Doran (US)
- Publication date: 17 May 1923 (UK); 28 September 1923 (US)
- Publication place: United Kingdom
- Media type: Print (hardback)
- OCLC: 3601985
- Preceded by: My Man Jeeves
- Followed by: Carry On, Jeeves

The Inimitable Jeeves by P. G. Wodehouse was the first of the Jeeves novels, although not originally conceived as a single narrative, being assembled from a number of short stories featuring the same characters. The book was first published in the United Kingdom by Herbert Jenkins, London, on 17 May 1923 and in the United States by George H. Doran, New York, on 28 September 1923, under the title Jeeves.

== Overview ==
The novel combined 11 previously published stories, of which the first six and the last were split in two, to make a book of 18 chapters. It is now often printed in 11 chapters, mirroring the original stories.

All the stories had previously appeared in The Strand Magazine in the UK, between December 1921 and November 1922, except for one, "Jeeves and the Chump Cyril", which had appeared in the Strand in August 1918. That story had appeared in the Saturday Evening Post (US) in June 1918. All the other stories appeared in Cosmopolitan in the US between December 1921 and December 1922.

This was the second collection of Jeeves stories, after My Man Jeeves (1919); the next collection would be Carry On, Jeeves, in 1925.

All of the short stories are connected and most of them involve Bertie's friend Bingo Little, who is always falling in love.

== Contents ==
The original story titles and publication dates were as follows (with split chapter titles in parentheses):

- "Jeeves in the Springtime" — Bertie's friend Bingo is in love with a waitress, Mabel, but fears his uncle won't approve of her. Jeeves suggests a plan using romance novels to sway Bingo's uncle.
  - UK: Strand, December 1921
  - US: Cosmopolitan, December 1921

("Jeeves Exerts the Old Cerebellum" and "No Wedding Bells for Bingo")

- "Aunt Agatha Takes the Count" — Aunt Agatha pushes an unwilling Bertie to marry a girl named Aline Hemingway, who, along with her brother Sidney, appears to be quiet and respectable. (The plot of this story is somewhat altered from the original published story, in which Bertie pursues Aline on his own initiative rather than being pressured to do so by Aunt Agatha.)
  - UK: Strand, April 1922
  - US: Cosmopolitan, October 1922 (as "Aunt Agatha Makes a Bloomer")

("Aunt Agatha Speaks Her Mind" and "Pearls Mean Tears")

- "Scoring off Jeeves" — Bingo is in love with Honoria Glossop, whom Aunt Agatha wants Bertie to marry. Bertie tries to sort out this dilemma without Jeeves's help.
  - UK: Strand, February 1922
  - US: Cosmopolitan, March 1922 (as "Bertie Gets Even")

("The Pride of the Woosters Is Wounded" and "The Hero's Reward")

- "Sir Roderick Comes to Lunch" — Reluctantly engaged to Honoria Glossop, Bertie must demonstrate to her father, Sir Roderick Glossop, that he is mentally sound. Meanwhile, Bertie's cousins Claude and Eustace appear.
  - UK: Strand, March 1922
  - US: Cosmopolitan, April 1922 (as "Jeeves the Blighter")

("Introducing Claude and Eustace" and "Sir Roderick Comes to Lunch")

- "Jeeves and the Chump Cyril" — While staying in America, Bertie is instructed by Aunt Agatha to keep Cyril Bassington-Bassington, son of an aristocratic friend of hers, from becoming a performer.
  - UK: Strand, August 1918
  - US: Saturday Evening Post, 8 June 1918

("A Letter of Introduction" and "Startling Dressiness of a Lift Attendant")

- "Comrade Bingo" — Bingo falls in love with Charlotte Corday Rowbotham, a member of a communist group called Heralds of the Red Dawn, and joins the group to win her affection.
  - UK: Strand, May 1922
  - US: Cosmopolitan, May 1922

("Comrade Bingo" and "Bingo Has a Bad Goodwood")

- "The Great Sermon Handicap" — At Twing Hall, Bertie, Bingo, and Bertie's cousins Claude and Eustace bet on a race involving the lengths of local parsons' sermons. Concurrently, Bingo is in love with Cynthia Wickhammersley.
  - UK: Strand, June 1922
  - US: Cosmopolitan, June 1922
- "The Purity of the Turf" — Bertie, Jeeves, and Bingo place bets on contests at the annual village school treat at Twing Hall. The bookmaker, Steggles, intends to undermine their bets.
  - UK: Strand, July 1922
  - US: Cosmopolitan, July 1922

(A pastiche or parody by Hugh Kingsmill, "Clubs are Trumps", follows immediately on from this story. It was published in 1931 in The English Review, and was later reprinted in The Best of Kingsmill (1970).)

- "The Metropolitan Touch" — Bingo falls in love with Mary Burgess, niece of the parson Heppenstall, and hopes to impress her by producing the Village School Christmas Entertainment at Twing.
  - UK: Strand, September 1922
  - US: Cosmopolitan, September 1922
- "The Delayed Exit of Claude and Eustace" — Claude and Eustace are being sent to South Africa following expulsion from Oxford, but they both fall in love with Bertie's friend Marion Wardour and refuse to leave.
  - UK: Strand, October 1922
  - US: Cosmopolitan, November 1922
- "Bingo and the Little Woman" — Bingo falls in love with a waitress again, and wants Bertie to get his uncle to approve the match. But there is something different about this waitress.
  - UK: Strand, November 1922
  - US: Cosmopolitan, December 1922

("Bingo and the Little Woman" and "All's Well")

== Publication history ==
Along with Right Ho, Jeeves and Very Good, Jeeves, the novel was included in a collection titled Life With Jeeves, published in 1981 by Penguin Books. The short story omnibus collection The World of Jeeves (1967) included the original versions of the eleven stories that were modified by Wodehouse to make up The Inimitable Jeeves.
