= The Ties That Bind (Jeeves and Wooster) =

- Jeeves and Wooster episode
- Episode no.: Season 4 Episode 6
- Directed by: Ferdinand Fairfax
- Original air date: 20 June 1993

Episode chronology
← Previous "Trouble at Totleigh Towers"	Next → —

"The Ties That Bind" is the sixth episode of the fourth series of the 1990s British comedy television series Jeeves and Wooster. It is also called "The Ex's Are Nearly Married Off". It first aired in the UK on 20 June 1993 on ITV.

In the US, it was aired as the fourth episode of the third series of Jeeves and Wooster on Masterpiece Theatre, on 31 October 1993.

== Background ==
Adapted from Much Obliged, Jeeves.

== Cast ==
- Bertie Wooster – Hugh Laurie
- Jeeves – Stephen Fry
- Aunt Agatha – Elizabeth Spriggs
- Roderick Spode – John Turner
- Sir Watkyn – John Woodnutt
- Tuppy Glossop – Robert Daws
- Madeline Bassett – Elizabeth Morton
- Florence Craye – Francesca Folan
- Ginger Winship – Julian Gartside
- Brinkley – Fred Evans
- Mrs McCorkadale – Selina Cadell
- Constable Oates – Sidney Livingstone
- Magnolia – Fiona Christie
- Butterfield – Preston Lockwood

== Plot ==
Bertie's friend Ginger Winship is engaged to Florence Craye, who is making Ginger stand for Parliament. Ex-valet Brinkley hopes to sell confidential information about Ginger to his opponent in the election. Meanwhile, Tuppy Glossop hopes to make a fortune running "Plumbo Jumbo", a plumbing machine that unblocks pipes.

== See also ==
- List of Jeeves and Wooster characters
