= The Great Sermon Handicap =

- Short story by P. G. Wodehouse
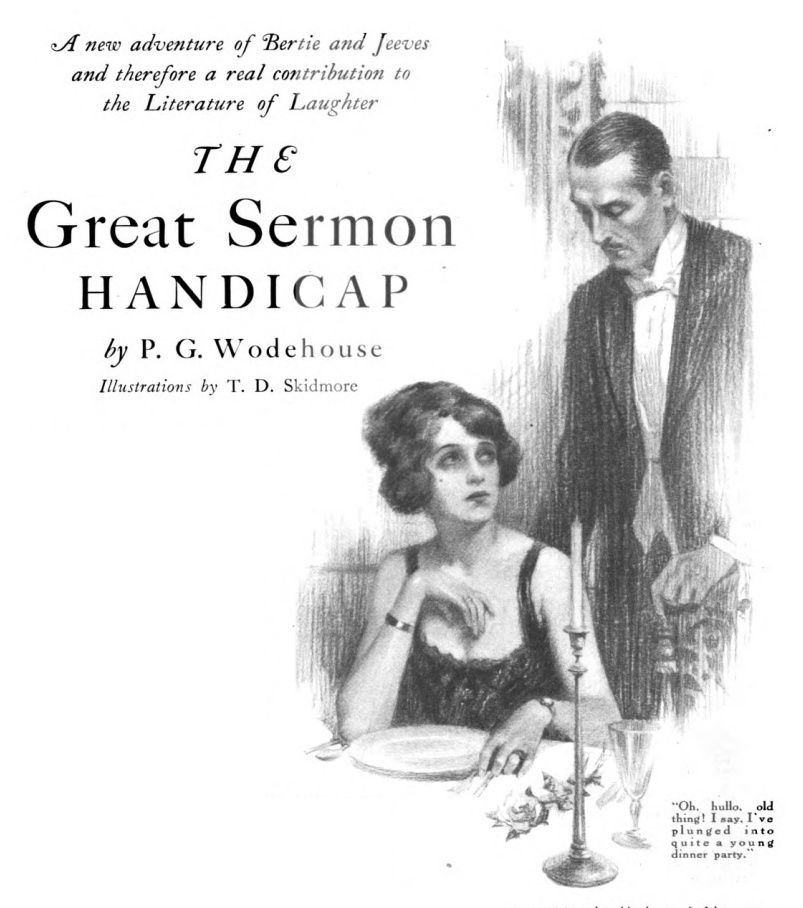
- 1922 Cosmopolitan title illustration by T. D. Skidmore
- Illustrator: A. Wallis Mills
- Country: United Kingdom
- Language: English
- Genre: Comedy

Publication
- Publisher: The Strand Magazine (UK); Cosmopolitan (US)
- Media type: Print (Magazine)
- Publication date: June 1922 (US)

Chronology
- Series: Jeeves
Comrade Bingo	The Purity of the Turf

"The Great Sermon Handicap" is a short story by P. G. Wodehouse, and features the young gentleman Bertie Wooster and his valet Jeeves. The story was published in The Strand Magazine in London in June 1922, and then in Cosmopolitan in New York that same month. The story was also included in the collection The Inimitable Jeeves as two separate stories.

In the story, Bertie and others make bets on an event called the Great Sermon Handicap. This story's plot continues into that of "The Purity of the Turf", though the two may be read as independent stories.

== Plot ==
Bertie receives a letter from his cousin Eustace, who is with his twin Claude and Bertie's friend Bingo Little at Twing Hall. Eustace invites Bertie, claiming there is an opportunity to make money. The letter includes a baffling list of ministers, times, and prices. Bertie goes to Twing, where he talks to a friend, Lady Cynthia. Bertie later sees Bingo, who confesses to being in love with Cynthia.

"Tomorrow week—Sunday the twenty-third—we're running off the great Sermon Handicap. Steggles is making the book. Each parson is to be clocked by a reliable steward of the course, and the one that preaches the longest sermon wins."

— Eustace explains the Sermon Handicap

The next morning, Bingo enters Bertie's bedroom to share his poetry about Cynthia. Claude and Eustace follow. Eustace says that an acquaintance, Steggles, came up with a fun variation on the standard horse race: the Sermon Handicap. Each local parson's Sunday sermon will be timed, and the parson who preaches the longest wins. Steggles made the list of parsons, their handicaps, and their current odds being taken for bets. One parson, Heppenstall, gives long sermons, but has a moderate handicap since Steggles underestimated him; Bertie funds bets on Heppenstall for a syndicate made of himself, Bingo, Claude, and Eustace. Eustace invites Jeeves to join them but Jeeves declines.

Later, Claude and Eustace alert Bertie that another parson, G. Hayward, also gives long sermons. To protect their bets, Bertie asks Heppenstall to preach his long sermon on Brotherly Love. However, Heppenstall falls ill; his succinct nephew Bates will take his place. Bertie's syndicate placed ante-post (pre-event) bets; consequently, they will lose their wagers when Heppenstall fails to appear at the event. They bet on G. Hayward to make up for their anticipated losses.

On Sunday, G. Hayward gives a long sermon. Bertie and Bingo return to the Hall, where Bingo chastises Jeeves, who placed an S.P. (starting price, i.e. price at start of event) bet on Bates. Jeeves gives Bertie a letter, delivered earlier by Heppenstall's butler Brookfield, informing that Bates will give the full sermon on Brotherly Love. Jeeves had heard this from Brookfield. Jeeves adds, to Bingo's dismay, that Bates is engaged to Lady Cynthia.

== Publication history ==
1922 Strand illustration by A. Wallis Mills

The story was reprinted separately as its own book, published by Hodder & Stoughton in 1933. The dust wrapper shows Bertie saying to Jeeves, "Jeeves old son, do you want a sporting flutter?"; however, it was Eustace who said this to Jeeves in the story.

This story was illustrated by A. Wallis Mills in the Strand, and by T. D. Skidmore in Cosmopolitan.

The 1932 collection Nothing But Wodehouse and the 1960 collection The Most of P. G. Wodehouse included this story. "The Great Sermon Handicap" was featured in the 1983 collection of Wodehouse stories titled P. G. Wodehouse Short Stories published by The Folio Society and illustrated by George Adamson, and in the 1984 collection of clergy-related Wodehouse stories The World of Wodehouse Clergy published by Hutchinson.

In 1940, the story was included in the anthology Laughter Parade, published by Faber & Faber. It was featured in the 1966 anthology Best Stories of Church and Clergy, published by Faber. The story was also collected in the 1979 anthology The Gambler's Companion with cartoons by Enzo Apicella, published by Paddington.

The story was translated into 57 languages published in a 6-volume set by J.H. Heineman, New York, in 1989. Each volume contains the English original and a phonetic transcription of it, with the following other languages and scripts:

- v.1: Latin, French, Spanish, Italian, Portuguese, Rumanian, Catalan, Rhaetoromansch
- v.2: Chaucerian English, Dutch, Flemish, Afrikaans, West Frisian, German, Mittelhochdeutsch, Plattdeutsch, Luxembourgian, Yiddish (Latin alphabet), Swiss German
- v.3: Swedish, Danish, Nynorsk, Norwegian, Faroese, Old Norse, Icelandic
- v.4: Esperanto, Pidgin English, French Creole, Papiamento, Finnish, Hungarian, Basque, Romany, Welsh, Breton, Irish, [Scottish] Gaelic
- v.5: Sanskrit, Armenian, Arabic, Maltese, Ancient Hebrew, Modern Hebrew, Aramaic, Amharic, Somali, Coptic
- v.6: Czech, Polish, Russian, Belarusian ("White Russian"), Ukrainian, Bulgarian, Macedonian, Serbo-Croatian (Latinica) ("Servo-Croatian"), Slovene ("Slovenian"), Slovak ("Slovakian")

== Influence ==
In 1930, some Cambridge undergraduate students founded "The Wooster Society" and repeated the Great Sermon Handicap. The field included the bishops of Ely and Singapore, Monsignor Ronald Knox, and a missionary, the Rev. H. C. Read, who won preaching at the parish church of St Andrew the Great.

== Adaptations ==
=== Television ===
The story was adapted for the third episode of the first series of The World of Wooster. The episode, titled "Jeeves and the Great Sermon Handicap", originally aired on 13 June 1965.

This story was not adapted for an episode by the Jeeves and Wooster television series.

=== Radio ===
This story, along with the rest of The Inimitable Jeeves, was adapted into a radio drama in 1973 as part of the series What Ho! Jeeves starring Michael Hordern as Jeeves and Richard Briers as Bertie Wooster.
