= The Purity of the Turf (short story) =

- Short story by P. G. Wodehouse
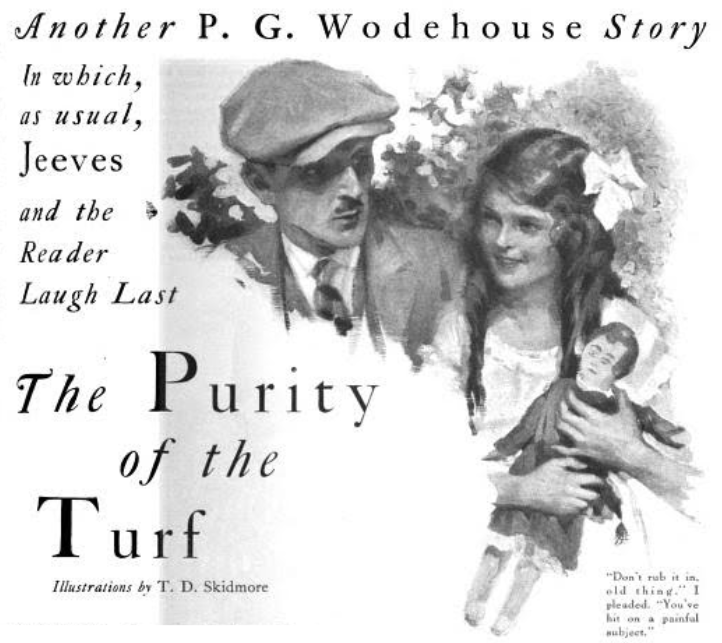
- 1922 Cosmopolitan illustration by T. D. Skidmore
- Illustrator: A. Wallis Mills
- Country: United Kingdom
- Language: English
- Genre: Comedy

Publication
- Publisher: The Strand Magazine (UK); Cosmopolitan (US)
- Media type: Print (Magazine)
- Publication date: July 1922

Chronology
- Series: Jeeves
The Great Sermon Handicap	The Metropolitan Touch

"The Purity of the Turf" is a short story by P. G. Wodehouse, and features the young gentleman Bertie Wooster and his valet Jeeves. The story was published in The Strand Magazine in London in July 1922, and in Cosmopolitan in New York that same month. The story was also included in the 1923 collection The Inimitable Jeeves.

The story features a school fair, where Bertie, Bertie's friend Bingo Little, and Jeeves form a syndicate to place bets on the contests. The underhanded bookmaker Steggles tries to rig the contests against them.

== Plot ==
A school treat is to be held on the grounds at Twing Hall. Steggles, who organized the Sermon Handicap, is offering bets on victors for contests at the fair. Bertie funds bets for a syndicate of himself, Bingo Little, and Jeeves. Bingo suggests betting on Mrs. Penworthy for the Mother's Sack Race. Jeeves recommends they place a bet on Harold, an underestimated contestant, for the Choir-Boys' Hundred Yards Handicap. They place their bets and train Harold for the event.

"In that case," he said, "those bets, you know – I'm afraid you lose your money, dear old boy. It's a pity you didn't put it on S.P. I always think S.P.'s the only safe way."
I gave him one look. Not a bit of good, of course.
"And they talk about the Purity of the Turf!" I said. And I meant it to sting, by Jove!

— Steggles taunts Bertie

Steggles discovers Harold's skill, and they realize Steggles might try to prevent Harold from racing. Bertie attends service at church, where Harold is in the choir, to watch over the boy. Steggles is also in the choir. Suddenly, Harold cries out, disrupting the sermon. Harold complains that somebody put a beetle down his back. The parson, Heppenstall, doubts Harold, and dismisses him from the choir, disqualifying him from the race. Steggles smugly tells Bertie he has lost his money, since Bertie did not bet on starting price but instead placed an ante-post bet, meaning Bertie forfeits his wager if Harold cannot race.

To make up for their loss over Harold, Jeeves tells Bingo to bet on Prudence Baxter for the Girls' Egg and Spoon Race. Bertie meets Prudence and doubts she will win.

Mrs. Penworthy loses her race because Steggles gives her too much food. Prudence also loses her race. Just as Bertie starts to mourns his losses, Heppenstall announces that a servant—implied to be Jeeves—has confessed to paying several participants in the Girls' Egg and Spoon Race to finish. The four girls who finished ahead of Prudence are disqualified. Prudence is declared the winner.

== Publication history ==
1922 Strand illustration by A. Wallis Mills

This story was illustrated by A. Wallis Mills in the Strand, and by T. D. Skidmore in Cosmopolitan.

"The Purity of the Turf" was included in the 1932 collection Nothing But Wodehouse and in the 1960 collection The Most of P. G. Wodehouse. The 1981 collection of crime-related Wodehouse stories, Wodehouse on Crime, and the 1984 collection of clergy-related Wodehouse stories, The World of Wodehouse Clergy, featured this story.

The story was included in the anthology Georgian Stories, published by Chapman and Hall in the UK and Putnam's in the US in 1924.

== Adaptations ==
=== Television ===
The television series The World of Wooster adapted the story. The episode–entitled "Jeeves and the Purity of the Turf"–was the fifth episode of the second series and was originally broadcast on 1 February 1966.

This story was also adapted for the Jeeves and Wooster television series. "The Purity of the Turf" was broadcast as the third episode of the first series, first airing in the UK on 6 May 1990. The story featured Hugh Laurie and Stephen Fry as, respectively, Wooster and Jeeves.

Some differences in plot occur, including:

- Lord Wickhammersely, the owner of Twing Hall, is featured in the television episode; he is only mentioned in the original story. Lady Wickhammersley, never mentioned in the original story, plays a prominent role in the television episode: she attempts to ban gambling at Twing Hall.
- Bingo falls in love with a girl named Myrtle and then later with another girl named Beryl, neither of whom appears in the original story.
- Cynthia Wickhammersley and Freddie Widgeon, who do not appear in the original story, join the syndicate.
- In the original story, it is Bingo's fault that Harold's athletic skill is discovered because he has Harold caddy for him. In the television episode, it is not Bingo's fault because Harold works as a caddy anyway.
- In the episode, Bertie attempts to win money by entering Bingo in the Eighty Yards' Dash for Mature Gentlemen, an event not mentioned in the original story.
- In the television episode, no mention of Prudence Baxter or her race occurs. Instead, Jeeves makes money for the syndicate by rigging Bingo's event against him.

=== Radio ===
This story, along with the rest of The Inimitable Jeeves, was adapted into a radio drama in 1973 as part of the series What Ho! Jeeves starring Michael Hordern as Jeeves and Richard Briers as Bertie Wooster.
