= Watkyn =

Watkyn may refer to

- Arthur Watkyn (Arthur Thomas Levi Watkins, 1907–1965), a British fiction writer
- Sir Watkyn Bassett, a fictional character invented by P. G. Wodehouse, the father of Madeline Bassett
