= Aunts Aren't Gentlemen =

1974 novel by P. G. Wodehouse

- First edition
- Author: P. G. Wodehouse
- Language: English
- Series: Jeeves
- Genre: Comic novel
- Publisher: Barrie & Jenkins (UK); Simon & Schuster (US)
- Publication date: October 1974 (UK); 14 April 1975 (US)
- Publication place: United Kingdom
- Media type: Print (hardcover and paperback)
- Pages: 176
- ISBN: 0-214-20047-7
- OCLC: 1167497
- Dewey Decimal: 823/.9/12
- LC Class: PZ3.W817 Au PR6045.O53
- Preceded by: Much Obliged, Jeeves

Aunts Aren't Gentlemen is a comic novel by P. G. Wodehouse, first published in the United Kingdom in October 1974 by Barrie & Jenkins, London, and in the United States under the title The Cat-nappers on 14 April 1975 by Simon & Schuster, New York. It was the last novel to feature some of Wodehouse's best known characters, Bertie Wooster and his resourceful valet Jeeves, and the last novel fully completed by Wodehouse before his death.

Taking place at a rural town called Maiden Eggesford, the story involves a plan by Bertie's Aunt Dahlia to kidnap a cat so that she can win a wager. The novel also chronicles the relationship between Bertie's acquaintances Orlo Porter and Vanessa Cook, and features Major Plank, whom Bertie first met in Stiff Upper Lip, Jeeves.

== Plot ==
Concerned by pink spots on his chest, Bertie goes to see E. Jimpson Murgatroyd, the Harley Street doctor recommended by his friend Tipton Plimsoll (who himself saw Murgatroyd for spots in Full Moon). On the way, Bertie sees Vanessa Cook, a headstrong girl he once proposed to but no longer wants to marry, leading a protest march. She is with her fiancé Orlo J. Porter, an acquaintance of Bertie's. Orlo and Vanessa are unable to marry since Vanessa's father, the trustee of Orlo's inheritance, refuses to give Orlo his inheritance because Orlo is a communist.

Bertie finds Major Plank (who was told that Bertie is a thief called Alpine Joe in Stiff Upper Lip, Jeeves) in the doctor's waiting room, though Plank does not recognize Bertie. Murgatroyd tells Bertie that the spots will go away, but recommends that Bertie get fresh air and exercise in the country. Bertie's Aunt Dahlia is going to Eggesford Hall, the home of her friend Colonel James Briscoe in the town of Maiden Eggesford in Somerset, near the seaside resort of Bridmouth-on-Sea, and gets a cottage called Wee Nooke for Bertie there. Jeeves is disappointed that they must cancel their upcoming trip to New York, but has the consolation that he will see his aunt in Maiden Eggesford.

At Maiden Eggesford, Bertie walks to Eggesford Hall, but goes to Eggesford Court, the home of Vanessa's father Mr. Cook, by mistake. Seeing a black cat with white fur on its chest and nose, Bertie pets it and moves to hold it. Cook sees this and thinks Bertie is stealing the cat. After he threatens Bertie with a hunting crop, Plank, who is Cook's guest, advises Bertie to leave, which he hastily does. Jeeves informs Bertie that Cook's horse Potato Chip and Briscoe's horse Simla will soon compete in a race at Bridmouth-on-Sea, and to perform well, Potato Chip must be near this stray cat that it recently befriended.

Vanessa urges Orlo to demand his inheritance from Cook. When Orlo refuses, she ends the engagement and decides she will marry Bertie. Bertie doesn't want to marry her, but is too polite to turn her down.

I tried to reason with her.
"You can't do this, old blood relation. It's as bad as nobbling a horse."
If you think that caused the blush of shame to mantle her cheek, you don't know much about aunts.
"Well, isn't nobbling a horse an ordinary business precaution everyone would take if only they could manage it?" she riposted.

— Bertie and Aunt Dahlia, about kidnapping Cook's cat

Aunt Dahlia has bet on Simla's victory in the race, and arranged for poacher Herbert "Billy" Graham (a joking reference to evangelist Billy Graham) to kidnap the cat to sabotage Potato Chip. Graham brings the cat to Bertie's cottage, but Bertie pays Graham to return the cat to avoid trouble.

After suggesting that Orlo approach Cook about his inheritance after Cook is mellowed by a good dinner, Jeeves goes to visit his aunt, Mrs. Pigott. Plank remembers that Bertie is Alpine Joe, and he and Cook suspect Bertie of stealing the cat. Graham fails to return the cat, so Bertie tries to return it himself. Carrying the cat up to Eggesford Court, Bertie trips and loses it. The cat ultimately goes back to Bertie's cottage.

Orlo is unable to convince Cook to give him his inheritance, yet Vanessa is happy that Orlo confronted her father anyway, and they elope. At his cottage, Bertie is accosted by Cook and Plank, who believe that Vanessa wants to marry Bertie. Bertie hands over a letter from Orlo proving that Orlo and Vanessa eloped. Cook is apologetic to Bertie, until the cat wanders in.

Thinking Bertie stole the cat, Cook and Plank tie him up. Cook brings the cat back to Potato Chip while Plank leaves to fetch the police. Jeeves appears and unties Bertie. Plank returns and initially thinks Jeeves is a policeman called Inspector Witherspoon (from Stiff Upper Lip, Jeeves), but Jeeves denies this. Pretending to be Bertie's solicitor, Jeeves convinces Plank that he is mistaken about Bertie, since Bertie, having ample wealth, has no reason to be a thief like Alpine Joe.

Jeeves realized that the stray cat actually belongs to his aunt. Bertie and Jeeves make a deal with Cook to lend him the cat until the race is over and not press charges for tying Bertie up, in exchange for Cook paying Mrs. Pigott a fee and giving Orlo his inheritance.

Bertie and Jeeves go to New York, which Bertie finds much calmer and quieter than Maiden Eggesford. In a letter, Aunt Dahlia's husband Tom Travers writes that the race was awarded to Briscoe's Simla after Cook's cat ran across the racecourse and startled Simla. Bertie is pleased for his aunt. However, he attributes the tranquility of his and Jeeves's stay in New York to their distance from aunts, particularly Aunt Dahlia, who, though genial, has a lax moral code. The trouble with aunts, Bertie tells Jeeves, is that they are not gentlemen.

== Style ==
Bertie regularly abbreviates his words, with abbreviation becoming more common as the series progresses. Of the 143 cases of abbreviation or shortened words (such as "the old metrop"), only 11 occur in the short stories, and more than half occur in the novels that follow Ring for Jeeves (with that novel having none, as Bertie is not present in the book). In order to make the abbreviations comprehensible, Bertie either introduces a word first and then abbreviates it, or abbreviates a familiar, clichéd phrase. Wodehouse uses these abbreviations to repeat information in varied and humorous ways. For example, Bertie uses three abbreviations in a passage in chapter 3:

So far, I said to myself, as I put back the receiver, so g. I would have preferred, of course, to be going to the aged relative's home, where Anatole her superb chef dished up his mouth-waterers, but we Woosters can rough it, and life in a country cottage with the aged r just around the corner would be a very different thing from a country c without her coming through with conversation calculated to instruct, elevate, and amuse.

Throughout the stories, Bertie learns literary quotations from Jeeves and renders them with informal language. One of the quotations Bertie learns from Jeeves is "all his men looked at each other with a wild surmise, silent upon a peak in Darien" (from "On First Looking into Chapman's Homer"), which Jeeves first mentions in the first chapter of Thank You, Jeeves. Bertie references this quotation many times, as in chapter 19 of Aunts Aren't Gentlemen, when he sees the stolen cat wandering in while Cook and Plank are on the premises: "I looked at it with a wild surmise, as silent as those bimbos upon the peak in Darien".

Similarly, Bertie often references the "fretful porpentine" passage from Shakespeare's Hamlet, which includes the following lines: "I could a tale unfold whose lightest word would harrow up thy soul, freeze thy young blood, make thy two eyes, like stars, start from their spheres, thy knotted and combined locks to part, and each particular hair to stand on end, like quills upon the fretful porpentine". In chapter 7, when Bertie is asked by Vanessa to hold Orlo's letters for her to pick up, Bertie states: "The idea of her calling at the cottage daily, with Orlo Porter, already heated to boiling point, watching its every move, froze my young blood and made my two eyes, like stars, start from their spheres, as I have heard Jeeves put it". Bertie then tells her Orlo is in the village, and describes her reaction: "I have said that her face had hardened as the result of going about the place socking policemen, but now it had gone all soft. And while her two eyes didn't actually start from their spheres, they widened to about the size of regulation golf balls, and a tender smile lit up her map". Near the end of the novel, when Jeeves finds Bertie tied and gagged, he frees him and offers him coffee. Bertie responds: "'A great idea. And make it strong,' I said, hoping that it would take the taste of Plank's tobacco pouch away. 'And when you return, I shall a tale unfold which will make you jump as if you'd sat on a fretful porpentine" (chapter 19).

Wodehouse frequently alludes to Arthur Conan Doyle's fictional detective Sherlock Holmes, with references to Holmes being present in Wodehouse's writing from 1902 up through Aunts Aren't Gentlemen, his last completed novel. Jeeves is a close parallel to Holmes, since he is the problem solver, while Bertie resembles Watson, being the admiring onlooker who chronicles their adventures. However, instead of having them be two social equals sharing a flat, Wodehouse gains additional humour by making Bertie the master and Jeeves the servant—then making it clear that Jeeves is really the one in charge. Jeeves and Bertie mimic the language of Holmes and Watson multiple times (though occasionally Bertie presumes to compare himself to Holmes before his plan inevitably fails). The most extended Holmes-Watson style conversation between Bertie and Jeeves occurs in Aunts Aren't Gentlemen, chapter 5, when Jeeves knows why Cook has accused Bertie of stealing his cat, even though he was not on the scene and has never met Cook:

"I think I can explain, sir."
It seemed incredible. I felt like Doctor Watson hearing Sherlock Holmes talking about the one hundred and forty-seven varieties of tobacco ash and the time it takes parsley to settle in the butter dish.
"This is astounding, Jeeves," I said. "Professor Moriarty wouldn't have lasted a minute with you. You really mean the pieces of the jig-saw puzzle have come together and fallen into their place?"
"Yes, sir."
"You know all?"
"Yes, sir."
"Amazing!"
"Elementary, sir. I found the habitués of the Goose and Grasshopper a ready source of information."

At one point in the novel, Bertie returns the kidnapped cat but then finds that the cat has ended up back at his place and does not know how this happened. Wodehouse scholar Elliott Milstein speculated that Jeeves is responsible, writing that "Jeeves wants Bertie to leave Maiden Eggesford and go to New York, which they eventually do. What better way to get the young master to shift-ho than to keep him festooned with hot cats? Besides, we never learn anything about this aunt of his. Is it not possible that she didn't really own the cat, but that Jeeves had her claim ownership in order to straighten everything out?" Milstein also commented that the fact that such speculation is possible, since Bertie learns little about Jeeves's machinations in the end unlike in the previous novels, shows that in this novel Wodehouse is making the reader work harder to learn all the facts.

== Background ==
According to his notes, Wodehouse considered having "someone landing B with the racetrack cat" in Jeeves in the Offing (1960). Ultimately, the idea was not included in that novel, but became a major part of the plot of Aunts Aren't Gentlemen. Wodehouse's notes suggest that he initially wrote the novel's basic action and dialogue, then added humorous lines and quotations later.

The Briscoe family and the town of Maiden Eggesford that feature in this novel had appeared previously in the Drones Club short story "Tried in the Furnace" (1935). Angelica Briscoe, who is the daughter of Colonel Briscoe and the niece of a parson in Aunts Aren't Gentlemen, was originally the parson's daughter in "Tried in the Furnace".

== Reception ==
- Susan Hill, The Times (17 October 1974): "The master is now spreading himself a bit thin—a laugh a page, rather than a line. And I don't care for all this up-dating—references to protest marches and civil disobedience. … Enough of this carping, for who else could possibly write, 'She uttered a sound rather like an elephant taking its foot out of a mud hole in a Burmese teak-forest'? I asked that question of a friend. (Not one of us.) 'Anyone else could', he replied. 'Tcha!' I said. And I meant it to sting".
- William Cole, The Saturday Review (5 April 1975): "The Cat-Nappers … is even better than the two that preceded it. A Jeeves-and-Bertie story about—no, not people who take snatches of sleep—people who steal a cat, with the idea of upsetting the cat's pal, a great racehorse. The whole thing is gloriously ridiculous, and if you've never read a Wodehouse, this would be a good place to start".
- Robert M. Strozier, The New York Times Book Review (22 April 1975): ""The Cat-nappers" features those favorites of the Wodehouse stock company, Jeeves the butler ('Would pusillanimous be the word for which you are groping, sir?') and Bertie Wooster ('Quite possibly. I know it begins with pu.') The ingredients are quite familiar: a theft, a sundered heart, an aunt, 'a hearty good morning to you, aged relative,' and numerous concatenations. People cross paths and call each other things like 'wee sleekit timorous cowering beastie' and 'elderly little gawd-help-us,' but, as always, everything rights itself in the end, with no real harm done to anyone".
- Max Hastings, The Sunday Times (21 December 2008): "Aunts Aren't Gentlemen … was the last of the Bertie Wooster canon. We cannot pretend that this book (first published in 1974) is among the best, but its author was incapable of not being funny. A doctor scratching his nose with his stethoscope tells Bertie, who feels under the weather, that he sees no objection to his visiting his aunt, so long as the conditions are right. "'Whereabout in Worcestershire does she live?' 'Near a town called Market Snodsbury.' 'Is the air pure there?' 'Excursion trains are run for people to breathe it.'" The author's emphasis on ping-pong dialogue reflects long experience as a writer for the stage. His work translates effortlessly to television, because characters, plots and lines are those of great sitcom".
- Sundeep Khanna, Mint (31 December 2015): "This year I revisited an old favourite, Pelham Grenville Wodehouse’s "Aunts Aren’t Gentlemen" that first lit up my life nearly 40 years ago when I was a callow youth. Over the years I have read bits of this little masterpiece but this year I read all 167 pages of it again and marveled at the sheer joie de vivre of the world of Wodehouse’s books".

== Adaptations ==
Aunts Aren't Gentlemen was adapted for radio for the BBC Radio 4 series Book at Bedtime, first airing in five fifteen-minute episodes from 16 December 2013 to 20 December 2013. The story was abridged by Richard Hamilton and the voices were provided by Blake Ritson.
