= The Metropolitan Touch =

- Short story by P. G. Wodehouse
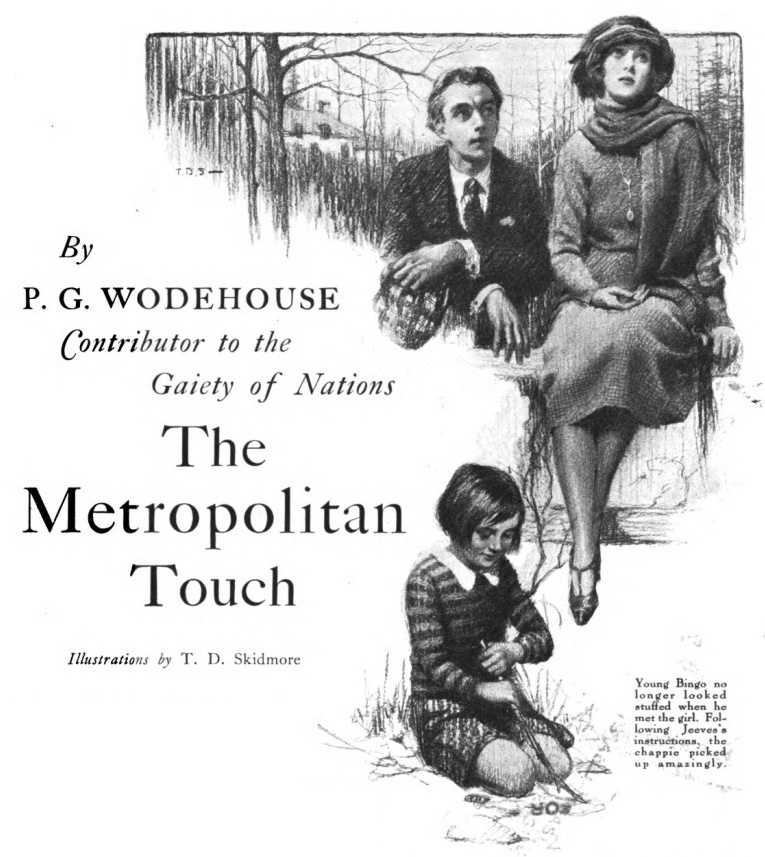
- 1922 Cosmopolitan title illustration by T. D. Skidmore
- Illustrator: A. Wallis Mills
- Country: United Kingdom
- Language: English
- Genre: Comedy

Publication
- Publisher: The Strand Magazine (UK); Cosmopolitan (US)
- Media type: Print (Magazine)
- Publication date: September 1922

Chronology
- Series: Jeeves
The Purity of the Turf	The Delayed Exit of Claude and Eustace

"The Metropolitan Touch" is a short story by English writer P. G. Wodehouse, and features the young gentleman Bertie Wooster and his valet Jeeves. The story was published in The Strand Magazine in London in September 1922, and then in Cosmopolitan in New York that same month. The story was also included in the 1923 collection The Inimitable Jeeves.

In the story, Bingo Little tries to impress his latest love interest, Mary Burgess, by producing a series of performances at a school Christmas show.

== Plot ==
Back in London, Bertie receives a telegram from Bingo Little, who is still at Twing Hall. Bingo is in love with Mary Burgess, niece of the local parson, Heppenstall. Jeeves approves of Mary, and he and Bertie return to Twing to encourage the match. Bingo has a rival, Wingham, who is courting Mary. Jeeves suggests that Bingo befriend Mary's younger brother, Wilfred. Bingo and Mary take Wilfred on walks, and things look promising. Bertie and Jeeves return to London.

Bertie gets another telegram from Bingo, asking for help. Jeeves goes to Twing for the night. He reports that Steggles, the bookmaker behind the Sermon Handicap and the betting at the school treat, is taking wagers against Bingo ending up with Mary. Steggles induced Bingo into betting that Wilfred would win an eating contest, and Wilfred became ill, causing Bingo to lose favor with Mary. Jeeves advised Bingo to do good deeds around the village to win back Mary.

"You think the thing will be a frost?"
"I could not hazard a conjecture, sir. But my experience has been that what pleases the London public is not always so acceptable to the rural mind. The metropolitan touch sometimes proves a trifle too exotic for the provinces."

— Jeeves expresses his doubts about Bingo's plan to Bertie

Later, Bertie returns home to find Bingo sleeping in his bed. Bertie wakes him, and Bingo relates that Mary is impressed by his good deeds and Wingham has fallen ill. To impress Mary, Bingo has taken responsibility for the Village School Christmas Entertainment. He will add songs from London shows to liven up the event. Bingo later sends Bertie a large poster for Bingo's show. Jeeves disapproves, and maintains that songs from London shows will not succeed with a rural audience.

Bertie goes to Twing to see the show. A boy performs "Always Listen to Mother, Girls!", a song from a London show that Bertie feels is not suited for children. The crowd is stunned. The next song is from another show where girls toss wool oranges to the audience, but the kids on stage throw real oranges at the crowd, and chaos ensues. Bertie looks for Bingo to warn him about the angered crowd. Defeated, Bingo tells Bertie that Steggles substituted real oranges for the balls of wool, and Mary is upset with him.

Mary and Wingham's engagement is announced. Bertie is sorry that Jeeves's efforts were wasted. Jeeves is not bothered, because he had placed a bet against Bingo.

== Publication history ==
1922 Strand illustration by A. Wallis Mills

The story was illustrated by A. Wallis Mills in the Strand, and by T. D. Skidmore in Cosmopolitan.

"The Metropolitan Touch" was featured in the American edition of the 1939 collection The Week-End Wodehouse, and the 1960 collection The Most of Wodehouse. The story was also included in the 1984 collection of clergy-related Wodehouse stories, The World of Wodehouse Clergy.

== Adaptations ==
=== Radio ===
This story, along with the rest of The Inimitable Jeeves, was adapted into a radio drama in 1973 as part of the series What Ho! Jeeves starring Michael Hordern as Jeeves and Richard Briers as Bertie Wooster.
