= The Delayed Exit of Claude and Eustace =

- Short story by P. G. Wodehouse
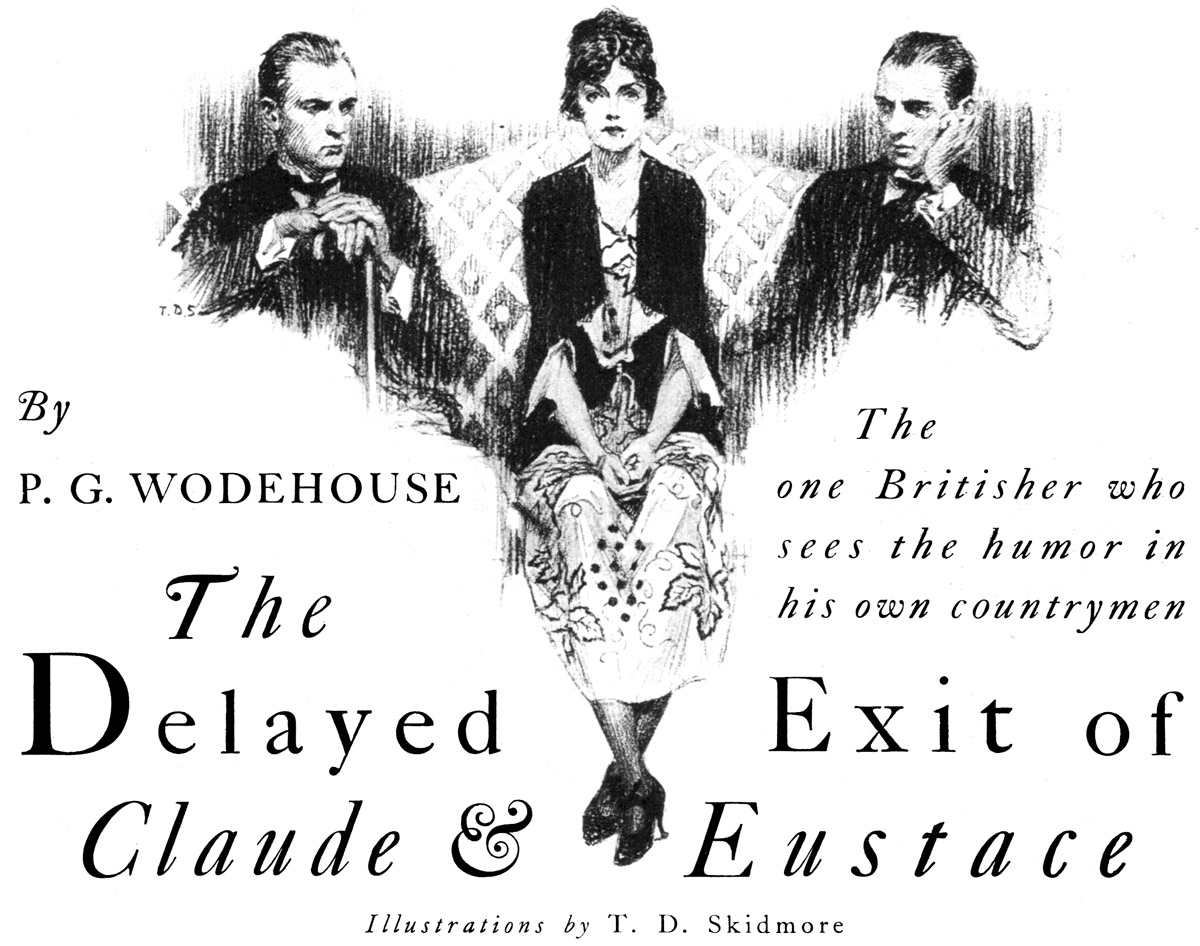
- 1922 Cosmopolitan title illustration by T. D. Skidmore
- Illustrator: A. Wallis Mills
- Country: United Kingdom
- Language: English
- Genre: Comedy

Publication
- Publisher: The Strand Magazine (UK); Cosmopolitan (US)
- Media type: Print (Magazine)
- Publication date: October 1922 (UK); November 1922 (US)

Chronology
- Series: Jeeves
The Metropolitan Touch	Bingo and the Little Woman

"The Delayed Exit of Claude and Eustace" is a short story by P. G. Wodehouse, and features the young gentleman Bertie Wooster and his valet Jeeves. The story was published in The Strand Magazine in London in October 1922, and then in Cosmopolitan in New York in November 1922. The story was also included in the 1923 collection The Inimitable Jeeves.

The story features Bertie's cousins Claude and Eustace Wooster, who are expelled from university and sent to South Africa. Bertie is stuck with them when they fall in love with the same woman and refuse to move out of Bertie's flat.

== Plot ==
"What did Aunt Agatha tell you?"
"She said you poured lemonade on the Junior Dean."
"I wish the deuce," said Claude, annoyed, "that people would get these things right. It wasn't the Junior Dean. It was the Senior Tutor."
"And it wasn't lemonade," said Eustace. "It was soda-water."

— Claude and Eustace proudly tell Bertie about their expulsion

Aunt Agatha visits Bertie and tells him his cousins Claude and Eustace, who have been expelled from Oxford, are being sent to work in South Africa. She instructs Bertie to look after them for a night. Bertie is concerned his cousins will cause trouble, but Jeeves is unsympathetic because he disapproves of Bertie's new spats with Etonian colours.

Claude and Eustace stay the night, though for most of the time they are out on the town, with Bertie a reluctantly chaperon. In the morning Claude and Eustace refuse to leave. They have both fallen in love with Bertie's friend Marion Wardour, and compete for her attention. Bertie tries to hide their failure to depart from Aunt Agatha, who tells him that his Uncle George was shocked to see Eustace on the street. She fears that it was Eustace's ghost and that an accident has occurred. Bertie relays this to Claude and Eustace, who wear false noses and moustaches to avoid being recognised.

Marion complains to Bertie about the twins’ constant attention, Claude having given her a cigarette case. Aunt Agatha wants Bertie to accompany Uncle George to Harrogate where he can recover his nerves. He has had another shock: a man with a moustache and a strange nose stole his cigarette case. Eustace later confronts Claude about this, and they are no longer on speaking terms. Suddenly both decide to leave for South Africa, each without telling the other. To Bertie’s delight they depart.

Bertie receives a letter and five pounds from Marion. Marion sent the money for Jeeves to thank him. He had advised her to tell the twins separately that she was going to South Africa and to meet her along the way. Jeeves also says that Bertie is no longer expected at Harrogate; Uncle George has recovered by drinking his valet's pick-me-up drink, made using a recipe Jeeves gave him. Bertie gratefully tells Jeeves he may burn the spats; Jeeves thanks him, saying he has already done so.

== Publication history ==
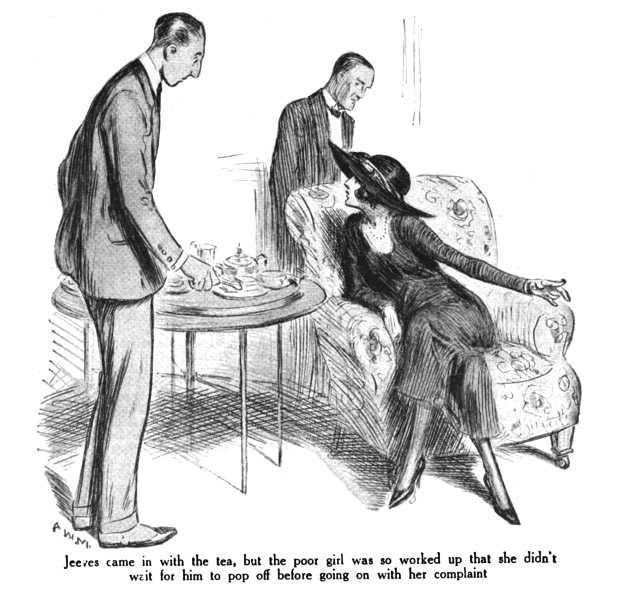
1922 Strand illustration by A. Wallis Mills

The story was illustrated by A. Wallis Mills in the Strand, and by T. D. Skidmore in Cosmopolitan.

== Adaptations ==
=== Television ===
The only surviving episode of The World of Wooster, titled "Jeeves and the Delayed Exit of Claude and Eustace", was adapted from this story and "Sir Roderick Comes to Lunch". The episode was originally broadcast on 4 January 1966.

This story was adapted in the Jeeves and Wooster episode "Return to New York", the first episode of the fourth series, which first aired in the UK on 16 May 1993. There are minor differences in plot, including:

- In the episode, the story takes place in New York rather than in London. Uncle George is not mentioned; it is Aunt Agatha who sees Eustace on the street. Jeeves gives Aunt Agatha the idea that she saw a ghost.
- In the episode, Marion is a singer, not an actress. Marion tries to flee by taking a job at a resort in Bay Shore, Long Island; Claude and Eustace try to follow, but Jeeves leads them to Aunt Agatha instead.
- Claude does not steal a cigarette case in the episode.

=== Radio ===
This story, along with the rest of The Inimitable Jeeves, was adapted into a radio drama in 1973 as part of the series What Ho! Jeeves starring Michael Hordern as Jeeves and Richard Briers as Bertie Wooster.
