= Much Obliged, Jeeves =

1971 novel by P. G. Wodehouse

- Front cover and spine of first UK edition
- Author: P. G. Wodehouse
- Language: English
- Series: Jeeves
- Genre: Comic novel
- Publisher: Barrie & Jenkins
- Publication date: 15 October 1971
- Publication place: United Kingdom
- Media type: Print
- Pages: 192
- ISBN: 0214653609
- OCLC: 832988
- LC Class: PZ3.W817 Ms FT MEADE
- Preceded by: Stiff Upper Lip, Jeeves
- Followed by: Aunts Aren't Gentlemen

Much Obliged, Jeeves is a comic novel by P. G. Wodehouse, published in the United Kingdom by Barrie & Jenkins, London, and in the United States by Simon & Schuster, Inc., New York under the name Jeeves and the Tie That Binds. Both editions were published on the same day, 15 October 1971, which was Wodehouse's 90th birthday.

Much Obliged, Jeeves is the penultimate novel featuring Wodehouse's characters Jeeves and Bertie Wooster. Taking place at Brinkley Court, the home of Bertie's Aunt Dahlia, the story involves Florence Craye and her fiancé Ginger Winship, Roderick Spode and his fiancée Madeline Bassett, and the Junior Ganymede club book, which is full of confidential and valuable information.

The two editions have slightly different endings. The book's American editor Peter Schwed changed the ending slightly and gave the US edition a new title. In the British version, when Jeeves reveals he has destroyed Bertie's pages from the Junior Ganymede's book as Bertie wanted, Bertie merely says, "Much obliged, Jeeves." In the American version, Bertie instead asks Jeeves why he destroyed the pages; Jeeves answers that no other valet will ever need to see the pages, because he will be Bertie's valet indefinitely, as there is a "tie that binds" between them.

== Plot ==
"The Junior Ganymede club book is a historic document. It has been in existence more than eighty years."
"It must be the size of a house."
"No, sir, the records are in several volumes. The present one dates back some twelve years. And one must remember that it is not every employer who demands a great deal of space."
"Demands!"
"I should have said 'requires'. As a rule, a few lines suffice. Your eighteen pages are quite exceptional."

— Jeeves and Bertie discuss the club book

Jeeves types a report of Bertie's latest misadventures for the club book of the Junior Ganymede Club, in which the club's members are required to record information about their employers, to inform those seeking employment about potential employers. Bertie worries that his embarrassing information will fall into the hands of his judgmental Aunt Agatha and asks Jeeves to destroy the pages about him, but Jeeves asserts that the book is secure and refuses to defy the rules of his club.

An old school friend of Bertie's, Ginger Winship, is standing for the House of Commons in a by-election at Market Snodsbury, near the home of Bertie's Aunt Dahlia, Brinkley Court, on the wishes of his strict fiancée. Aunt Dahlia persuades Bertie to come to Brinkley to assist in the canvassing. Before departing, Bertie has drinks with Jeeves at the Junior Ganymede. They discuss how Ginger's chances for election will be hurt if the public learns about his rowdy past (mild by Bertie's standards but potentially offensive to the traditional rural populace of Market Snodsbury). At the club, they see an uncouth ex-valet that Bertie once employed, Bingley, who greets Jeeves in an overly familiar fashion, calling him "Reggie".

At Brinkley, he discovers Ginger's fiancée is the overbearing Florence Craye, who has previously been betrothed to several people, including Bertie. Florence mistakenly believes that Bertie still wants to marry her, and Bertie's personal code prevents him from telling her otherwise. The intimidating Roderick Spode, 7th Earl of Sidcup has come to deliver speeches for Ginger, and he has brought his fiancée, Madeline Bassett. Like Florence, Madeline thinks Bertie wants to marry her and Bertie is too polite to correct her.

Also present is L. P. Runkle, a financier and collector, who is visiting Brinkley to sell a silver porringer worth nine thousand pounds to Bertie's uncle Tom Travers (who has fled Brinkley Court to avoid the guests). Runkle was the employer of the late father of Bertie's friend Tuppy Glossop, and profited from Tuppy's father's invention, leaving little for Tuppy and his father. Dahlia wants to soften up Runkle and get him to pay Tuppy his due so Tuppy can finally marry his fiancée, Angela, Aunt Dahlia's daughter.

Ginger's chances for election (and thus his engagement to Florence) are threatened by Bingley, who has purloined the Junior Ganymede club book. Bingley intends to sell its pages about Ginger to his opponent or to the local newspaper. To prevent this, Jeeves pays Bingley a social visit, taking the opportunity to slip him a Mickey Finn and recover the book.

Surprisingly, this does not please Ginger. After disappointing Florence in his performance at the Council meeting, he no longer wants to marry her, and has fallen in love with his secretary, Magnolia Glendennon. Like Bertie, Ginger is prevented by his personal code from telling a woman he does not want to marry her. To spur Florence to break the engagement, Ginger wants the local newspaper to print the club book's pages about him, but Jeeves is unwilling to part with the book. Meanwhile, Spode is entranced by the reception he is getting at his speeches for Ginger, and thinks of renouncing his title and running for the Commons himself. This upsets Madeline, who wants to become a Countess. Madeline considers marrying Bertie instead of Spode.

Aunt Dahlia, failing to convince Runkle to give Tuppy any money, has stolen the silver porringer he wished to sell to Tom. Bertie tries to return the porringer, but is caught, and hides the object in his bureau drawer. At the candidate debate, Ginger, following Jeeves's advice, endorses his opponent and resigns the race. Havoc ensues between the opposing sides, and those present, including Spode and Florence, are pelted with produce. Florence breaks her engagement with Ginger, and he promptly elopes with Magnolia.

Bingley (in Runkle's employ) discovers the missing porringer in Bertie's drawer, and Runkle accuses Bertie of the theft. While Bertie faces jail time, this has the positive effect of keeping Florence from trying to marry Bertie. Spode realises he would prefer to stay in the produce-free House of Lords and chooses to keep his title. He and Madeline reconcile.

Finally, Jeeves reveals secrets about Runkle written about him by Bingley in the club book, preventing him from pressing charges against Bertie, and also forcing him to give Tuppy his legacy. Noting that Bingley was able to steal the club book, Bertie again asks Jeeves to destroy the eighteen pages that Jeeves wrote about Bertie. Jeeves states that he has already done so.

== Style ==
Generally, Bertie makes use of words and phrases he learned from Jeeves throughout the series, while Jeeves does not repeat terminology introduced by Bertie. The sole exception to this pattern occurs in Much Obliged, Jeeves. In chapter 12, when Bertie asks Jeeves about the odds against Aunt Dahlia getting money from Runkle, Jeeves searches for a way to describe Runkle, trying to recall a term used previously by Bertie to describe tough antagonists like Spode:

"It is on the tip of my tongue."
"A stinker?"
No, he said, it wasn't a stinker.
"A tough baby?"
"No."
"A twenty-minute egg?"
"That was it, sir. Mr. Runkle is a twenty-minute egg."

Jeeves repeats the phrase in chapter 15, when Bertie remembers that Jeeves put the odds at a hundred-to-one:

"Approximately that, sir."
"Runkle being short of bowels of compassion."
"Precisely, sir. A twenty-minute egg."

This unique reversal of the verbal relationship between Jeeves and Bertie highlights the reversal created in the book between their usual positions. Ordinarily, Jeeves does not make mistakes and is ultimately rewarded by Bertie in some way; in this novel, Jeeves makes a mistake believing that the club book is secure while Bertie predicts correctly that the book will be used for blackmail, and Jeeves rewards Bertie in the end by destroying the eighteen pages he had recorded about Bertie in the book.

Wodehouse frequently repeats the same information in two or more ways for comic effect. One way this occurs is when Bertie employs two or more virtually synonymous words when only one is necessary. In chapter 4, Bertie uses a reference book belonging to Jeeves to come up with a flood of synonyms to emphasize Bingley's effrontery toward Bertie and Jeeves at the Junior Ganymede Club:

As to his manner, I couldn't get a better word for it at the moment than "familiar", but I looked it up later in Jeeves's Dictionary of Synonyms and found that it had been unduly intimate, too free, forward, lacking in proper reserve, deficient in due respect, impudent, bold and intrusive. Well, when I tell you that the first thing he did was to prod Jeeves in the lower ribs with an uncouth finger, you will get the idea.

In all of the Jeeves novels, one of Bertie's primary goals is to avoid marriage, making Bertie an inversion on the typical hero of romantic comedies whose ultimate goal is to become engaged or married. Bertie's Aunt Dahlia concisely summarizes the recurring threat of marriage that Bertie is repeatedly faced with in the penultimate chapter of Much Obliged, Jeeves, when she has heard the news about Spode changing his mind after being hit by a potato. Furthermore, the same passage places undue emphasis on how neatly things have worked out and mentions a "guardian angel", hinting that Jeeves may have thrown the potato or arranged for someone to throw the potato at Spode:

A look almost of awe came into the ancestor's face.
"How right you were," she said, "when you told me once that you had faith in your star. I've lost count of the number of times you've been definitely headed for the altar with apparently no hope of evading the firing squad, and every time something has happened which enabled you to wriggle out of it. It's uncanny."
She would, I think, have gone deeper into the matter, for already she had begun to pay a marked tribute to my guardian angel, who, she said, plainly knew his job from soup to nuts, but at this moment Seppings appeared and asked her if she would have a word with Jeeves, and she went out to have it.

Bertie is shown to have an idealistic nature, which contrasts with Jeeves's more pragmatic views. This is illustrated in chapter 15, when Bertie tries to persuade Aunt Dahlia to return a silver porringer because stealing it was a breach of hospitality, while Jeeves merely states that no useful end will be accomplished by retaining the object. The unscrupulous Bingley's behaviour suggests to some degree what Jeeves might be like if he were entirely amoral (Jeeves, like Bingley, uses the club book for blackmail purposes), and shows how Bertie's innocence redeems the dishonorable tactics used by Jeeves by giving them an altruistic and honorable goal.

== Background ==
The earliest surviving notes for the novel are dated 10 December 1966. According to the notes, Wodehouse planned for "some crook butler" to steal the Junior Ganymede club book, and considered having this butler threaten to reveal the information in the book about Bertie to Bertie's Aunt Agatha in order to get him to undertake some dreadful task.

Revisions to an early typed draft of the novel show that Wodehouse made many small changes to make the language more humorous, a process which Wodehouse's American editor Peter Schwed termed "adding the laugh lines". For instance, Wodehouse added "I feel full to the brim of Vitamin B" to Bertie's dialogue near the beginning of the first chapter.

Schwed changed the ending of Much Obliged, Jeeves for the American edition because he believed that Jeeves would not damage the club book by tearing out Bertie's pages "without a rational explanation", and drafted a longer Wodehouse-style ending, in which Jeeves explains that the book's entry on Bertie is unnecessary because he will remain permanently with Bertie. Wodehouse worked Schwed's version into the ending of the American edition, which uses the title suggested by Schwed, Jeeves and the Tie That Binds.

Bingley was introduced under the name "Brinkley" in the 1934 novel Thank You, Jeeves. In Much Obliged, Jeeves, Bertie initially does call him "Brinkley", though Jeeves soon corrects him. This use of retroactive continuity regarding the character's name was apparently due to the potential for confusion with this story's setting at Brinkley Court.

This novel is significant as it is the first time in the Wooster canon that Jeeves' first name (Reginald) is revealed.

== Publication history ==
The novel was included in the 1976 three novel collection titled Jeeves, Jeeves, Jeeves, along with How Right You Are, Jeeves and Stiff Upper Lip, Jeeves, which was published by Avon.

== Reception ==
- Richard Armour, The Los Angeles Times (23 January 1972): "Despite the basic sameness of the Wodehouse books, each is somehow fresh and different. And this is one of the freshest and fastest moving. There is no use trying to tell what it is about, except perhaps that it involves a club for butlers to which Jeeves belongs, and a club book into which Jeeves has written some rather personal things about his employer. If it should get out (as of course it does) it would be a little like the Pentagon Papers. But it isn't the plot but what Wodehouse does with it in his sprightly way of writing".
- John K. Hutchens, The Saturday Review (12 February 1972): "Inquire of any good Wodehousian what his hero's newest book is 'like,' and the fellow will stare at you as if you were the idiot you must be to ask such a question. It is like Stiff Upper Lip, Jeeves, like Bertie Wooster Sees It Through, like A Damsel in Distress, and like all their magnificent company in its rippling, apparently effortless narrative, its uninsistent comedy of word play and wildly plausible situation, its characters who could not conceivably be confused with anyone else's characters or with one another".

== Adaptations ==
=== Television ===
The story was adapted into the Jeeves and Wooster episode "The Ties That Bind" which first aired on 20 June 1993. This was the last episode in the series. There are some changes to the plot:

- In the episode, the ex-valet who stole the Junior Ganymede club book is still called Brinkley. The setting is Totleigh Towers, not Brinkley Court.
- Runkle and Aunt Dahlia are absent, while Aunt Agatha and Sir Watkyn Bassett are present at Totleigh Towers in the episode.
- Jeeves does not use a drug to incapacitate Brinkley in the episode. Bertie steals the book back while Jeeves is conversing with Brinkley. Brinkley steals it back, but then Florence obtains the club book and believes that it is a work of fiction authored by Brinkley.
- In the episode, Bertie inadvertently becomes engaged to both Florence Craye and Madeline Bassett simultaneously. Bertie breaks up with Florence by informing her that he is engaged to Madeline, and Jeeves finds a damaging secret about Spode (involving a kangaroo called Celia), forcing him to reclaim his title and reconcile with Madeline.
- In the episode, Tuppy, at Bertie's request, comes to Totleigh with a huge drain pumper called "Plumbo Jumbo" to unclog the pipes. When Spode chases Tuppy off the premises, the Plumbo Jumbo is left running, and ultimately the pipes erupt, spraying everyone in the chapel during Madeline and Spode's wedding ceremony, causing them to angrily chase both Bertie and Jeeves counterclockwise around the chapel. In the original story, Tuppy is not present and a wedding ceremony did not occur.

== See also ==
- P. G. Wodehouse bibliography
