= Jeeves and the Feudal Spirit =

1954 novel by P. G. Wodehouse

- First edition
- Author: P. G. Wodehouse
- Language: English
- Series: Jeeves
- Genre: Comic novel
- Publisher: Herbert Jenkins (UK); Simon & Schuster (US)
- Publication date: 15 October 1954 (UK); 23 February 1955 (US)
- Publication place: United Kingdom
- Media type: Print (Hardback & Paperback)
- Preceded by: Ring for Jeeves
- Followed by: Jeeves in the Offing

Jeeves and the Feudal Spirit is a comic novel by P. G. Wodehouse, first published in the United Kingdom on 15 October 1954 by Herbert Jenkins, London and in the United States on 23 February 1955 by Simon & Schuster, Inc., New York, under the title Bertie Wooster Sees It Through. It is the seventh Jeeves novel.

The novel takes place at Brinkley Court, the home of Bertie's Aunt Dahlia, who is intent on selling her weekly magazine, Milady's Boudoir. Florence Craye and G. D'Arcy "Stilton" Cheesewright are major characters in the story.

== Plot ==
Bertie has grown a moustache, which Jeeves disapproves of. G. D'Arcy "Stilton" Cheesewright, a fellow member at the Drones Club who has drawn Bertie's name in the annual club darts sweep, becomes jealous when Cheesewright’s fiancée Florence Craye says she loves Bertie's moustache. Florence and Bertie were engaged in the past, and Stilton mistakenly believes Bertie still loves her. Stilton is also jealous of Percy Gorringe, a playwright dramatizing Florence's novel Spindrift.

Disappointed with Stilton after he refuses to grow a moustache, Florence asks Bertie to take her to a night club for research for her next novel. Hoping to talk her into returning to Stilton, Bertie agrees. However, the night club is raided. When Florence tries to run away, Bertie trips a policeman chasing her. Florence escapes and Bertie spends the night in jail before paying a fine of ten pounds. Shortly afterward, Florence and Stilton reconcile when Stilton agrees to grow a moustache.

At her home of Brinkley Court, Aunt Dahlia, Bertie's aunt who runs a magazine called Milady's Boudoir, is trying to sell the paper to the Liverpudlian newspaper magnate Mr. Trotter, who brought along his wife Mrs. Trotter and his stepson, Percy Gorringe. Aunt Dahlia has hired the successful novelist Daphne Dolores Morehead, who is staying at Brinkley, to write a serial for Milady's Boudoir, to make the magazine appear successful to Mr. Trotter. Aunt Dahlia is also trying to win over Mr. Trotter with the magnificent cooking of her French chef, Anatole, though this does not seem to be working.

Florence has also gone to Brinkley Court. Aunt Dahlia tells Bertie to come to Brinkley to cheer up Percy, who is in love with Florence and upset that she is with Stilton. Stilton discovers that Florence and Bertie went to a night club together, and breaks his engagement to her by telegram. He comes to Brinkley Court, seeking revenge on Bertie, who avoids Stilton.

Bertie learns from Aunt Dahlia that she pawned the pearl necklace her husband Tom Travers bought her to pay for the new serial, without telling Tom. She is wearing a fake pearl necklace instead, and fears that Lord Sidcup, a jewellery expert who is coming to see Uncle Tom's silver collection, will reveal the necklace as a fake. Jeeves suggests that Bertie act as a burglar and steal the fake necklace. Bertie attempts to do so but mistakenly enters Florence's bedroom. She is moved to see him and assumes that he is in love with her. When Stilton comes to return her letters, Florence says she will marry Bertie, and Stilton, finding Bertie in Florence's room, becomes aggressive. Bertie saves himself by reminding Stilton about the Drones Club darts sweep: hurting Bertie could cost Stilton fifty-six pounds and ten shillings. Uncle Tom locks Aunt Dahlia's necklace in a safe. In addition, Lord Sidcup is revealed to be the recently elevated Roderick Spode.

After selling his Drones Club darts sweep ticket to Percy Gorringe, Stilton again threatens Bertie. Bertie tries, unsuccessfully, to fend off Stilton with a cosh, though Stilton forgets about Bertie and Florence when he sees Daphne Dolores Morehead and falls for her. Seeing Uncle Tom's safe open, Bertie takes a pearl necklace he sees there. Next he talks to Aunt Dahlia, who says she took the fake necklace from the safe. The necklace Bertie took belongs to Mrs. Trotter. Bertie tries to put back the second necklace, but is unable to do so since Mr. Trotter shuts the safe door.

Feudal fidelity would no doubt make Jeeves seal his lips, but you can't let fellows go sealing their lips if it means rendering themselves liable to an exemplary sentence, coupled with some strong remarks from the Bench. Come what might, the dirt would have to be dished.

— Bertie prepares to confess

At breakfast, Aunt Dahlia's butler Seppings presents Mrs. Trotter's pearl necklace on a salver, stating that he found it in Jeeves's room. Though Bertie prepares to confess stealing the necklace to save Jeeves, Jeeves says he planned to find the necklace's owner, since he realized the pearls were fake and assumed the necklace belonged to a housemaid. Spode, or Lord Sidcup, confirms the pearls are fake. Percy admits that he pawned his mother's real pearl necklace to produce the play based on Florence's novel. Florence is touched, and she and Percy get engaged.

Mr. Trotter dislikes Anatole's cooking. However, he feels much better after having one of Jeeves's special drinks, and purchases Milady's Boudoir. Grateful to Jeeves, Bertie agrees to shave off his moustache.

== Style ==
The novel is typical of the episodic structure of problems and solutions seen in other late Jeeves novels. Wodehouse increasingly used sudden reversals of plot premises as part of this structure. Two examples of this are the reveal that Spode has sold Eulalie Soeurs, and Mrs. Trotter's unexpected decision that her husband should refuse a knighthood. Another way the novel is similar to other late Jeeves novels is that Bertie and Jeeves feud over one specific thing but cooperate in every other way, and their disagreement serves as an amusing plot point without being structurally crucial as in the early Jeeves novels.

One of the stylistic devices Wodehouse uses for comic effect is the transferred epithet, as in chapter 11: "He waved a concerned cigar". Wodehouse occasionally creates humorous nonce-compounds, sometimes by adding the word -joy to a noun. This occurs when lip-joy is used to mean '"moustache" in chapter 4. (Similarly, head-joy is used to mean "hats" in chapter 1 of Stiff Upper Lip, Jeeves.) Bertie often learns intellectual words from Jeeves and uses them in comic ways, as when Bertie references the Latin phrase rem acu tetigisti, an expression introduced by Jeeves, in chapter 21: "It was enough. I saw that, as always, he had tetigisti-ed the rem".

Another device used for humour is the pun. For instance, a pun occurs in chapter 6, when Florence talks to Bertie after he has spent a night in jail:

"Are you all right now?"
"Well, I have a pinched look."

Wodehouse often uses comical names in his stories. Examples of this in Jeeves and the Feudal Spirit include the names of Lemuel Gengulphus Trotter (who is against being knighted due to the fact that he would be called Sir Lemuel) and the night-club Bertie and Florence go to, The Mottled Oyster, as well as the other night-clubs Bertie mentions, such as The Feverish Cheese and the Startled Shrimp.

Bertie's searching to find the right word is frequently a source of humour, as when he talks to Jeeves about his cousin Thos in chapter 16:

"Let a plugugly like young Thos loose in the community with a cosh, and you are inviting disasters and…what's the word? Something about cats."
"Cataclysms, sir?"
"That's it. Cataclysms."

Antagonists in Wodehouse's stories sometimes express desire to commit acts of violence, as in chapter 2: "And this had led Stilton, a man of volcanic passions, to express a desire to tear me limb from limb and dance buck-and-wing dances on my remains". The humour in passages of this kind derives from the obviously ridiculous physical impossibility of the events described.

Wodehouse's stories feature many references to the stage that emphasize the similarity between the narrative and a stage performance. This includes dialogue resembling a script, theatrical terminology, and characters described with theatrical conventions. For example, Bertie describes Florence when she is upset after Stilton unexpectedly knocks on her door while Bertie is with her: "Florence clapped a hand to her throat, a thing I didn't know anybody ever did off the stage".

== Background ==
According to a letter Wodehouse wrote to his friend William "Bill" Townend on 13 January 1954, Wodehouse originally wrote Jeeves and the Feudal Spirit as a 30,000 word story, which was refused by various magazines. After rewriting it as a novel, Wodehouse realized the problem: no explanation was given for how Jeeves could tell a supposedly valuable pearl necklace was an imitation. Wodehouse wrote in the letter, "I have just written to a jeweller asking for professional advice on the point. What I want to know is Can anyone be taught to spot imitation jewels, or do you have to have some sort of flair?" The problem is resolved in the final version of the novel, in which Jeeves states that he learned while studying under a cousin in the profession that cultured pearls have a core.

This story marks the second time Jeeves disapproves of Bertie having a moustache. The first time occurred in "Jeeves and the Hard-boiled Egg".

At one point in the story, Bertie defends his moustache by stating that a moustache looks good on the actor David Niven, with Jeeves replying that a moustache suits David Niven but not Bertie. David Niven had portrayed Bertie Wooster (with a moustache) in the earlier 1936 film Thank You, Jeeves!.

== Publication history ==
In addition to its UK and US publications, this story was also published under the title Double Jeopardy in Canada, in the 4 December 1954 issue of the Star Weekly, with illustrations by Alex Redmond.

The US edition includes a long dedication by Wodehouse to editor Peter Schwed.

Under the title Bertie Wooster Sees It Through, the story was included in the Wodehouse collection Five Complete Novels, published by the American publisher Avenel Books in May 1983.

== Reception ==
- G. B. Stern, The Sketch (3 November 1954): "Never again, as he did once, should Mr. Wodehouse attempt to give us Jeeves without Bertie; in his new novel they stand together and complement each other; Jeeves and the Feudal Spirit is a real beauty, a lallapaloosa … Plus the chivalrous and debonair Bertie Wooster, it contains all our favourite ingredients: Aunt Dahlia and her Chef, Anatole; Aunt Dahlia and Bertie letting themselves go in an exasperated crescendo of long colloquial telegrams; the beautiful but heavily intellectual Florence continually breaking off her engagement to Stilton Cheesewright in favour of the terrified Bertie … and above all, that ever-ingenious Wodehouse plot showing us a good man beset by circumstances over which he has no control".
- Rex Lardner, The New York Times (27 February 1955): "In this, his sixtieth book, P. G. Wodehouse again takes up some of the special travails of the upper classes of that sprightly, curiously archaic Wodehousian world in which people exclaim 'Woof!' and 'Ga boom!'— a world in which felony is a footling trifle and chilled toast in the morning is an abysmal tragedy. … The book has its Wodehousian quota of gaily tossed metaphors, dialogue that bounces merrily along, sentences full of rich trim, and is flowered with carefully selected clichés—clichés that a lesser man might forbear to use. Bertie is confronted with a series of near-things, including a violent end by strangulation, marriage to the wrong lady, and indigestion. But before the curtain goes down the pieces fall into place and everything is right as rain".

== Adaptations ==
=== Television ===
The story was adapted into the Jeeves and Wooster episode "The Delayed Arrival" which first aired on 6 June 1993. The plot remains largely the same, with some minor changes:

- In the episode, Jeeves impersonates the American novelist Daphne Dolores Morehead when Morehead is unable to come to Brinkley Court. Additionally, Bertie briefly disguises himself as a maid named Beryl.
- To push along the sale of Milady's Boudoir, Jeeves suggests blackmailing Mr. Trotter, who turned down a knighthood, which he does not want his socially ambitious wife to know about. In the original story, this plan fails, but it succeeds in the episode.
- Roderick Spode does not appear in the episode. He is replaced by a different jewellery expert, Mr. Burwash.
- Unlike in the novel, the darts tournament is actually depicted in the episode. The competition ends in a tie between Bertie and Freddie Widgeon.

=== Radio ===
Jeeves and the Feudal Spirit was adapted for radio in 1979 as part of the series What Ho! Jeeves starring Michael Hordern as Jeeves and Richard Briers as Bertie Wooster.
