= Madeline Bassett =

Fictional character in P. G. Wodehouse stories

- Jeeves character
- Elizabeth Morton as Madeline Bassett
- First appearance: Right Ho, Jeeves (1934)
- Last appearance: Much Obliged, Jeeves (1971)
- Created by: P. G. Wodehouse
- Portrayed by: Bridget Armstrong; Francesca Folan; Elizabeth Morton and others

In-universe information
- Gender: Female
- Family: Sir Watkyn Bassett (father)
- Relatives: Stiffy Byng (cousin)
- Nationality: British

Madeline Bassett is a fictional character in the Jeeves stories by English comic writer P. G. Wodehouse, being an excessively sentimental and fanciful young woman to whom Bertie Wooster intermittently, and reluctantly, finds himself engaged.

== Life and character ==
The daughter of Sir Watkyn Bassett and the cousin of Stephanie "Stiffy" Byng, Madeline has golden hair, a treacly voice, a tinkling, silvery laugh and when she sighs, it sounds "like the wind going out of a rubber duck". Bertie Wooster describes her in Right Ho, Jeeves as "a pretty enough girl in a droopy, blonde, saucer-eyed way but not the sort of breath-taker that takes the breath", though elsewhere he describes her as "physically in the pin-up class". He also notes that she is excessively mushy and fanciful, regularly espousing whimsical beliefs about gnomes and stars. She plays piano and is apt to sing folk songs, especially when she is trying to cheer herself up. She was educated at Roedean. Madeline enjoys reading Christopher Robin and Winnie the Pooh and the works of Rosie M. Banks. Inspired by the poet Percy Bysshe Shelley to become a vegetarian, she nonetheless has no knowledge of cooking.

While generally calm, she is capable of giving out an angry glare that could match even that of Bertie's Aunt Agatha. Bertie is surprised to learn this in Stiff Upper Lip, Jeeves, when he asks her hypothetically what would happen if Gussie Fink-Nottle ate steak and kidney pie (against her wish for him to be vegetarian). She questions Bertie if Gussie has been doing so. As Bertie states: "I had never supposed that she had it in her to give anyone a piercing look, but that is what she gave me now. I don't think even Aunt Agatha's eyes have bored more deeply into me."

Her first appearance is in Right Ho, Jeeves. She meets and befriends Angela Travers and also meets Angela's cousin Bertie Wooster during a stay in Cannes. She mistakenly believes that Bertie is in love with her and is gazing at her with long, dumb, searching looks. When he tries to tell her subtly that "someone" (Gussie Fink-Nottle) has feelings for her, Madeline incorrectly thinks that Bertie is talking about himself. To his great relief, she turns him down, as she is in love with Gussie; she assures Bertie that, if ever her engagement to Gussie were to fail, Bertie is the first person she would look to as a replacement fiancé. Since Bertie's personal code does not allow him to insult her by correcting her misunderstanding or rejecting her offer, he is thereafter under threat of having to marry her if she rejects her first choice.

She becomes engaged (and disengaged) frequently in the novels, having idealistic standards that sometimes her fiancé cannot live up to. She becomes engaged to Bertie and Gussie in Right Ho, Jeeves and to Bertie and then back to Gussie in The Code of the Woosters. Her engagement to Gussie holds during The Mating Season, in which she visits an old friend of hers, Hilda Gudgeon, with whom she was educated at Roedean. Gussie later elopes with Emerald Stoker and Madeline becomes engaged variously to Bertie and Roderick Spode (Lord Sidcup) in Stiff Upper Lip, Jeeves and again to Bertie and then back to Spode in Much Obliged, Jeeves. Ultimately, she is engaged to Spode and appears to be on her way to becoming the next Countess of Sidcup.

== Appearances ==
Madeline appears in:

- Right Ho, Jeeves (1934)
- The Code of the Woosters (1938)
- The Mating Season (1949)
- Stiff Upper Lip, Jeeves (1963)
- Much Obliged, Jeeves (1971)

Madeline is mentioned in:

- Aunts Aren't Gentlemen (1974) (ch. 7)

== Quotes ==
Madeline is distinctive for her maudlin and fanciful statements, illustrated by the following examples.

Direct speech:

- "'Every time a fairy sheds a tear, a wee bit star is born in the Milky Way.'"
- "'When I was a child, I used to think that rabbits were gnomes, and that if I held my breath and stayed quite still, I should see the fairy queen.'"
- "'Beautiful smiling flowers, all wet with the morning dew. How happy flowers seem, Hilda.'"
- "'One morning we had walked in the meadows and the grass was all covered with little wreaths of mist, and I said didn't he sometimes feel that they were the elves' bridal veils...'"
- "'And that evening we were watching the sunset, and I said sunsets always made me think of the Blessed Damozel leaning out from the gold bar of heaven...'"
- "'Today I danced on the lawn before breakfast, and then I went round the garden saying good morning to the flowers.'"
- "'I think I shall always be a fragrant memory, always something deep in your heart that will be with you like a gentle, tender ghost as you watch the sunset on summer evenings while the little birds sing their off-to-bed songs in the shrubbery.'"

Attributed speech:

- "Well, I mean to say, when a girl suddenly asks you out of a blue sky if you don't sometimes feel that the stars are God's daisy-chain, you begin to think a bit." – Narration by Bertie Wooster about Madeline
- "'She holds the view that the stars are God's daisy chain, that rabbits are gnomes in attendance on the Fairy Queen, and that every time a fairy blows its wee nose a baby is born...'" – Said by Bertie about Madeline

== Adaptations ==
Television

- In the 1990–1993 television series Jeeves and Wooster, Madeline was portrayed by Francesca Folan in series 1, Diana Blackburn in series 2, and Elizabeth Morton in series 3 and series 4.

Stage

- In the 1975 musical Jeeves, Madeline was portrayed by Gabrielle Drake.
- In the London premiere of By Jeeves, the 1996 rewrite of the previous musical, Madeline was portrayed by Diana Morrison.
- Madeline is one of the characters portrayed in the 2013 play Jeeves and Wooster in Perfect Nonsense. In the play, the events of The Code of the Woosters are reenacted by Bertie, Jeeves, and Seppings.

Film

- In the 2001 recording of the musical By Jeeves, Becky Watson played Madeline.

Radio

- Madeline was voiced by Anne Richmond in the 1956 BBC BBC Light Programme radio dramatisation of Right Ho, Jeeves.
- In the 1973–1981 radio drama series What Ho! Jeeves, Madeline was voiced by Bridget Armstrong (Right Ho, Jeeves, The Code of the Woosters, and The Mating Season) and Aimi MacDonald (Stiff Upper Lip, Jeeves).
- Madeline was voiced by Jenny Funnell in the 1988 BBC radio adaptation of Right Ho, Jeeves.
- In the 1997 L.A. Theatre Works radio adaptation of The Code of the Woosters, Madeline was voiced by Patrice Egleston.
- In BBC Radio 4's 2006 adaptation of The Code of the Woosters for its Classic Serial series, Madeline was voiced by Flaminia Cinque.
- Madeline was voiced by Elizabeth Knowelden in the 2018 BBC radio adaptation of Stiff Upper Lip, Jeeves.

== See also ==
- List of Jeeves characters, an alphabetical list of Jeeves characters
- List of P. G. Wodehouse characters in the Jeeves stories, a categorized outline of Jeeves characters
- List of Jeeves and Wooster characters, a list of characters in the television series
