= Elizabeth Morton =

British actress and screenwriter (born 1961)

- Born: 8 January 1961 (age 65); Liverpool, England
- Occupations: Actress, screenwriter
- Spouse: Peter Davison (m. 2003)
- Children: 2
- Relatives: Georgia Tennant (stepdaughter); David Tennant (stepson-in-law)
- Website: https://www.elizamorton.com/

Elizabeth Heery (born 8 January 1961) is a British actress, screenwriter and novelist. As an actress and author she works under the name Elizabeth Morton and Eliza Morton. She played Madeline Bassett in ITV series Jeeves and Wooster. Since 2016, she has been an ambassador for the Orange Tree Theatre in Richmond. She trained at the Guildhall School of Drama and The Royal Court Young Writers Group.

She is also a short story writer and has written for BBC Radio 4, Channel 4, ITV and BBC Films and TV. In 2018, she secured a two-book deal with Ebury Press, an imprint of Penguin Random House. Her novel A Liverpool Girl was published in 2019, followed by in August 2020, A Last Dance in Liverpool. The books reached Number 1 and Number 3 respectively in The Bookseller's Heatseekers Charts. In August 2020 she secured a book deal with Pan Macmillan for two more Liverpool sagas. Angel of Liverpool was published in 2021 and was a number 3 Heatseeker, People's Friend Recommendation and reached the Top 10 WHSmith bestsellers. The Girl From Liverpool was published July 2022 and also made Top 10 Booksellers Heatseekers chart and No 5 Amazon Historical Romance Bestsellers. Elizabeth narrates all her books for audio. In 2022, Angel of Liverpool was shortlisted for RoNA Best Saga award.

In August 2022 she received a three-book deal from Pan for her ‘Orphans of The Living’ trilogy - The Orphans From Liverpool Lane, The Children Left Behind, and Betsy's War. Betsy's War was one of five finalists in the RNA 2026 Best Romantic Saga Award, making her twice nominated.

== Life and education ==
Heery was educated at Seafield Convent School in Liverpool. She studied at the Guildhall School of Drama. She is married to actor Peter Davison. The couple have two sons, Louis Davison who is an actor, starring in Netflix Vikings Valhalla, and Joel Davison, also an actor, starring in Mammoth BBC, and a musician. She also has a step-daughter, actress Georgia Tennant.

== Career ==
=== Television and film ===
Heery's first TV role under the name Morton was playing Papagena in BBC sci-fi series The Tripods. As well as playing a regular in ITV series Jeeves and Wooster and Watching, she starred in BBC's Rockliffe's Folly, playing Hester Goswell, and was in seasons four and five of London's Burning, playing Helen Field.

She guest starred in British TV series Spender, The Brothers McGregor, Brookside, Capital City, and Dear John. In 1988 she starred in Philip Ridley's film The Universe of Dermot Finn, which was officially selected for The Cannes Film Festival. In 1995, she starred in Gurinder Chadha's BBC film Rich Deceiver, playing Gabriella de Courtney. On PBS America, she played Miss Jessel in the film The Haunting of Helen Walker. She was in Tobe Hooper's Life Force, Franc Roddam's Lords of Discipline, and Alan Clark's Billy the Kid and The Green Baize Vampire. She appeared as herself in the Doctor Who 50th anniversary film, The Five(ish) Doctors Reboot.

=== Stage and audio ===
She is a voice actress best known for the film Faeries, starring Kate Winslet and her work with Big Finish audio drama. In 2016, she voiced Mary Westerna in Dracula, starring Mark Gatiss. In 2015, she voiced the role of Teldak in The Waters of Amsterdam, starring Peter Davison, and Stella Preston in The Avengers, the Lost Episodes. She was a member of Toby Robertson's company at Theatr Clwyd, alongside actors Ralph Fiennes and Nathaniel Parker. She was in the original casts of Howard Goodall's Girlfriends and The Hired Man. She played Linda in the second cast of Blood Brothers in the West End, directed by Bill Kenwright.

=== Writing ===
Heery began using her birth name for writing after winning The London Writer's Competition sponsored by Time Out Group. She was a member of The Royal Court Young Writers Group and took up a bursary at ITV on the New Writer's Initiative scheme. She has written for the BBC Radio 4 drama series Brief Lives. and episodes of BBC Doctors, C4 Film Series Coming Up, BBC Brief Encounters mentored by Andrew Davies, and CBeebies[ Topsy and Tim. She is a short story writer, having been shortlisted and won prizes in 2016 Margery Allingham CWA writer's award, 2012 Bath Short story award, Exeter Short story award, Trisha Ashley Award, Fish short story award 2015.

In 2012, she formed Twotreeisland films and won first prize in Southend-On-Sea film festival for the film Beached. She wrote the plays Feeding the Troll, which premiered at the Edinburgh Festival, Clip which ran at Battersea Arts Centre, First Kiss and Lauren The Brave at the Landor Theatre, and Sophie in Wonderland, which was produced by Theatre 503.

She has written seven romantic saga books; A Liverpool Girl was published in 2019 and A Last Dance in Liverpool was published in 2020. The Girl From Liverpool was published July 2022. In 2022, Angel of Liverpool was shortlisted for RoNA Best Saga award.

In August 2022 she received a three-book deal from Pan for her ‘Orphans of The Living’ trilogy - The Orphans From Liverpool Lane, The Children Left Behind, and Betsy's War. Betsy's War was one of five finalists in the RNA 2026 Best Romantic Saga Award, making her twice nominated.

== Filmography ==
Year	Title	Role	Notes
1983	The Lords of Discipline	Girlfriend	
1985	Life Force	Second Radar Technician	
1985	The Tripods	Papagena	
1986	The Brothers McGregor	The Girl	1 episode
1987	Billy the Kid and the Green Baize Vampire	Vidkid	
1987	Dear John	Karen	1 episode
1987	Brookside	Sizzler's Girlfriend	1 episode
1988	Rockliffe's Folly	WPC Hester Goswell	5 episodes
1988	The Universe of Dermot Finn	Pearl	Short
1989	Capital City	Sophie	1 episode
1991	Spender	Rose	1 episode
1991–1992	London's Burning	Helen Field	9 episodes
1991–1993	Watching	Lucinda Stoneway	15 episodes
1992–1993	Jeeves and Wooster	Madeleine Bassett	5 episodes
1995	Rich Deceiver	Gabriella de Courtney	TV movie
1995	The Haunting of Helen Walker	Miss Jessel	TV movie
1999	Faeries	Princess Brigid	Voice
2013	The Five(ish) Doctors Reboot	Maternity Nurse	
