= Jeeves in the Offing =

1960 novel by P. G. Wodehouse

- First UK edition
- Author: P. G. Wodehouse
- Language: English
- Series: Jeeves
- Genre: Comic novel
- Publisher: Simon & Schuster (US); Herbert Jenkins (UK)
- Publication date: 4 April 1960
- Publication place: United States
- Media type: Print
- Dewey Decimal: 823.912
- LC Class: PR6045 .O53
- Preceded by: Jeeves and the Feudal Spirit
- Followed by: Stiff Upper Lip, Jeeves

Jeeves in the Offing is a comic novel by P. G. Wodehouse, first published in the United States on 4 April 1960 by Simon & Schuster, Inc., New York, under the title How Right You Are, Jeeves, and in the United Kingdom on 12 August 1960 by Herbert Jenkins, London.

The eighth Jeeves novel, Jeeves in the Offing chronicles another visit by Bertie Wooster to his Aunt Dahlia at Brinkley Court, and includes recurring characters Sir Roderick Glossop and Bobbie Wickham. It is the only novel to feature Aubrey Upjohn, former headmaster of Malvern House Preparatory School, in person as a major character.

== Plot ==
An old friend Bertie went to preparatory school with, Reginald "Kipper" Herring, is staying with Bertie for a week. Bertie eagerly accepts an invitation from his aunt, Aunt Dahlia, to her home, Brinkley Court, since Jeeves is about to go to Herne Bay on holiday. Aunt Dahlia's husband, Bertie's Uncle Tom, is trying to make a business deal with an American named Homer Cream. While the two of them are in Harrogate, Mr. Cream's wife Adela Cream, an author of mystery stories, and their son Wilbert Cream are staying at Brinkley Court. The mischievous Roberta "Bobbie" Wickham, and Aubrey Upjohn, who was once Bertie and Kipper's oppressive headmaster, will also be there, along with Phyllis Mills. She is Upjohn's stepdaughter and Aunt Dahlia's goddaughter. Upjohn hopes to stand for a local election after giving a speech at the Market Snodsbury grammar school, and Phyllis is typing his speech.

"Jeeves!" I yelled, and then remembered that he had long since gone with the wind. A bitter thought, for if ever there was an occasion when his advice and counsel were of the essence, this occ. was that occ. The best I could do, tackling it solo, was to utter a hollow g. and bury the face in the hands.

— Bertie sees the engagement announcement

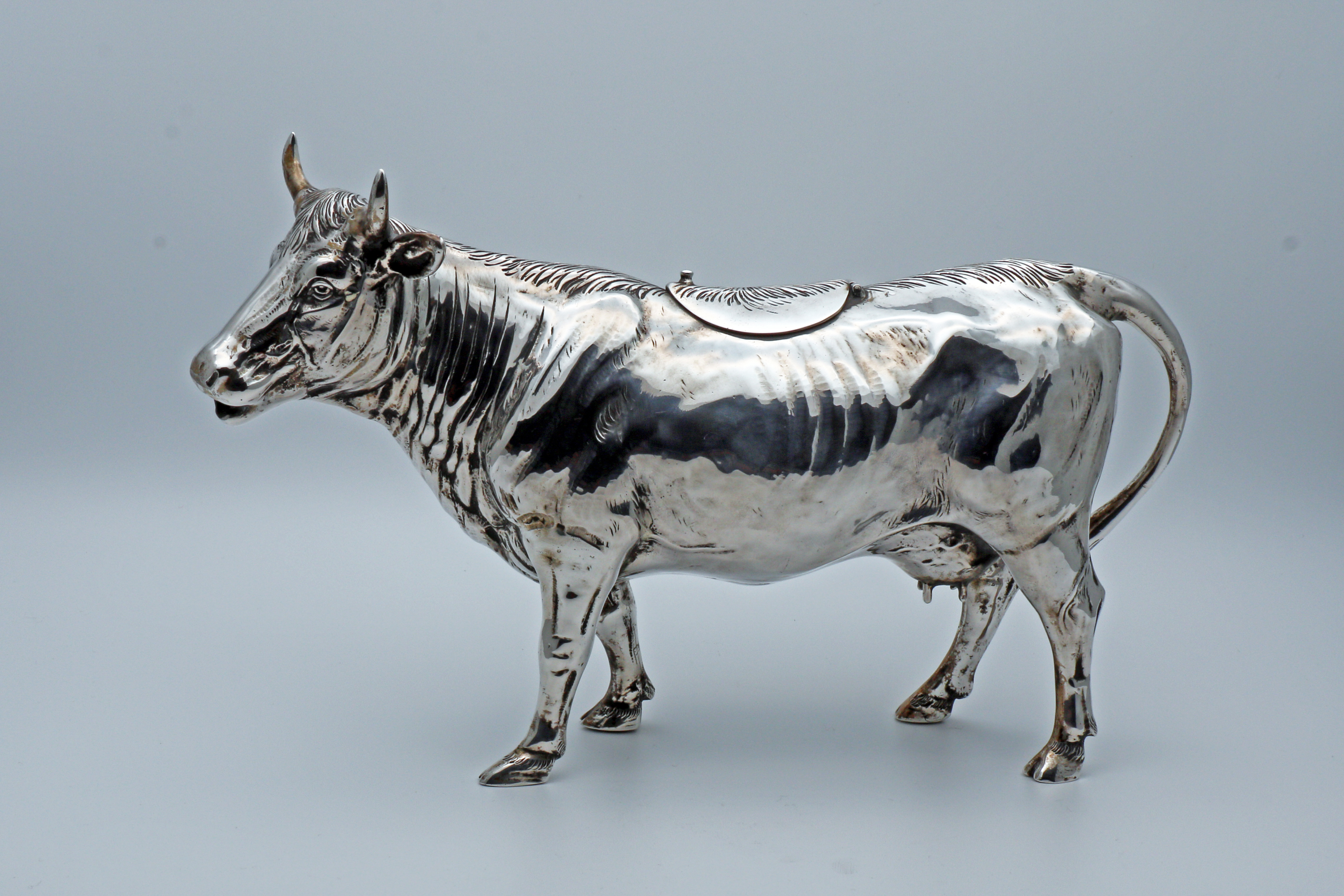
A silver cow-creamer, like the one that is key to the plot of Jeeves in the Offing: "a silver jug or pitcher or whatever you call it shaped, of all silly things, like a cow with an arching tail and a juvenile-delinquent expression on its face, a cow that looked as if it were planning, next time it was milked, to haul off and let the milkmaid have it in the lower ribs. Its back opened on a hinge and the tip of the tail touched the spine, thus giving the householder something to catch hold of when pouring. Why anyone should want such a revolting object had always been a mystery to me."

Before going to Brinkley Court, Bertie learns that Kipper, who works for a weekly paper and is vengeful towards Upjohn, wrote a scathing, anonymous review of Upjohn's recently published book. Jeeves tells Bertie that Willie Cream is a notorious troublemaking playboy known as "Broadway Willie". After Jeeves leaves, Bertie sees a jarring announcement in The Times stating that he, Bertie, is engaged to Bobbie.

At Brinkley Court, Bertie finds Wilbert Cream reading poetry to Phyllis. He then finds Bobbie, who assures him that the engagement announcement was merely to scare her mother, who dislikes Bertie, into approving the man Bobbie really wants to marry, Reginald Herring.

Upjohn is urging his daughter Phyllis to marry Wilbert. Aunt Dahlia, disapproving of Willie's reputation, wants to prevent the match. Since Brinkley Court's butler, Seppings, is away on holiday, Aunt Dahlia engages the renowned psychiatrist Sir Roderick Glossop to step in as his replacement, adopting the alias “Swordfish”, so that he may observe and report on Wilbert's behaviour. Bertie tries to keep Wilbert away from Phyllis. By letter, Jeeves informs Bertie that Willie Cream is a kleptomaniac. Uncle Tom's silver cow-creamer goes missing.

While Bobbie is away, Kipper comes to Brinkley Court. He was engaged to Bobbie, but thinks it is over after seeing the marriage announcement for Bertie and Bobbie. He is relieved when Bertie tells him the announcement was fake. Glossop searches Wilbert Cream's room for the cow-creamer, and bonds with Bertie. Bobbie ends her engagement to Kipper after reading an angry letter he wrote when he first saw the marriage announcement, and proclaims she will marry Bertie. Bertie does not want to marry her, but is prevented by his personal code from turning down any woman, so he drives to Herne Bay to get help from Jeeves. Jeeves agrees to return to Brinkley with Bertie. Bobbie soon forgives Kipper's letter, but Kipper, to spite Bobbie, becomes engaged to Phyllis.

Aunt Dahlia tells Bertie that Wilbert Cream did not steal the cow-creamer. Uncle Tom sold it to him. Meanwhile, Upjohn intends to sue Kipper's paper for libel. While his review was mostly legitimate, a small libellous portion was secretly added by Bobbie. Apologetic, Bobbie reconciles with Kipper. Glossop suggests that Kipper save his job by rescuing Upjohn from drowning. After Bertie and Bobbie fail to push Upjohn in the nearby lake, Bertie and Phyllis's dog Poppet fall in instead. Kipper dives in to help Bertie, mistaking him for Upjohn, and Wilbert dives in to help Phyllis's dog Poppet. Moved, Phyllis gets engaged to Wilbert. This initially upsets Aunt Dahlia, though it turns out that Wilbert is not actually the infamous Broadway Willie: that is his younger brother, Wilfred.

Upjohn becomes aware that Kipper wrote the scathing review and refuses to stay in the same house. Jeeves packs for Upjohn, neglecting to pack Upjohn's typed speech. After receiving the typescript from Jeeves, Bobbie makes Upjohn withdraw his libel suit before she returns it to him.

Thinking Wilbert stole it, Glossop confiscated the cow-creamer. Adela Cream finds the cow-creamer in Glossop's room and thinks he stole it. To prevent a misunderstanding, Glossop has revealed his true occupation. Following Jeeves's advice, Glossop has claimed he had been brought to observe Bertie and had recovered the cow-creamer from Bertie's room. Bertie is upset that the Cream family thinks he is a kleptomaniac, but Jeeves placates Bertie by saying that he has the satisfaction of helping his uncle. Bertie, remembering receiving gifts from Uncle Tom while at prep school, replies, "How right you are, Jeeves!"

== Style ==
Wodehouse juxtaposes slang with formal language for comic effect. One of the ways this occurs is when Bertie tries to recall a quotation or Jeeves recites it, and Bertie then rephrases that quotation with more colloquial language. For example, Bertie and Jeeves allude to Shakespeare's Macbeth and Hamlet in chapter 11:

"[Poppet's] belligerent attitude is simple—"
"Sound and fury signifying nothing, sir?"
"That's it, pure swank. A few civil words and he will be grappling you…what's the expression I've heard you use?"
"Grappling me to his soul with hoops of steel, sir?"
"In the first two minutes."

In addition to picking up literary allusions from Jeeves, Bertie learns many words and phrases from him, especially Latin terminology. While illustrating the influence that Jeeves has over Bertie, this also leads to Bertie rephrasing Jeeves's formal language in comical ways. For example, a ludicrous effect is created when Bertie combines the Latin phrase nolle prosequi, which he learned from Jeeves, with a Biblical reference when explaining to Bobbie that it was Balaam's ass that was noted for stubbornness, not Jonah's, in chapter 19:

"Jeeves."
"Sir?"
"To settle a bet, wasn't it Balaam's ass that entered the nolle prosequi?"
"Yes, sir."

When Bertie uses a word or phrase he learned from Jeeves, it is typically one that Jeeves used earlier in the same story or in a previous story. However, on a few occasions, Bertie mentions picking up a word or phrase from Jeeves that Jeeves was never depicted using earlier in the series. This occurs in chapter 1, when Bertie employs the word altruistic: "You are probably not familiar with the word, but it's one I've heard Jeeves use. It's what you say of a fellow who gives selfless service, not counting the cost".

Wodehouse occasionally has Bertie using transferred epithets, usually modifying the grammatical object of the sentence with an adjective instead of using the corresponding adverb to modify the verb of the sentence. (For example, "He was now smoking a sad cigarette and waiting for the blow to fall"). In at least one instance, Wodehouse uses a transferred epithet by modifying the grammatical subject of the sentence with an adjective to describe the emotion of the person concerned. This occurs in chapter 2: "It was plain that I had shaken him. His eyes widened, and an astonished piece of toast fell from his grasp".

== Background ==
The expression "in the offing", used in the novel's title for the UK edition, describes something that is likely to happen or arrive soon.

The earliest extant notes for the novel, written by Wodehouse in November 1956, show that he initially planned for the plot to have Aunt Dahlia and Uncle Tom away in America, while Aunt Agatha and Lord Worplesdon were staying at Brinkley Court. This preliminary plot involves an American millionaire and the theft of the silver cow-creamer, similar to the final story, as well as Bertie reading in the paper of his engagement to someone, though it is to a girl whom he has never met. The notes indicate that Wodehouse determined some of the basic parts of the plot before deciding on the specific characters as placeholders are in place of character names, as in the following note: "X wants to marry Y, gets B. to say he is engd. to Y. Formidable mother."

After dropping the project in December 1956, Wodehouse resumed working on it in early 1958. In August 1958, he composed a list of characters, which includes several characters not present in the final version of the book. These characters include Uncle Tom's sister, Judson Coker (a character from Wodehouse's 1924 novel Bill the Conqueror), and Edwin the Boy Scout (the troublesome young brother of Florence Craye), who would have acted as a detective.

A surviving late draft for the novel shows some small changes made by Wodehouse to make Bertie's language more comical and elaborate. For example, in the sentence, "His blood pressure was high [, his eye rolled in what they call a fine frenzy,] and he was death-where-is-thy-sting-ing like nobody's business", the clause in brackets was inserted.

Like in Jeeves and the Feudal Spirit, there is a reference in the book to David Niven, the actor who portrayed Bertie Wooster in the earlier 1936 film Thank You, Jeeves!. In the novel, Bertie describes the suspected playboy Wilbert Cream as resembling David Niven.

== Publication history ==
This story appeared in three magazines under the title How Right You Are, Jeeves. First, the story was serialized from 29 August to 19 September 1959 in the British magazine John Bull magazine, illustrated by Richard O. Rose, then published in February 1960 in the American magazine Playboy, illustrated by Bill Charmatz, and lastly published on 23 April 1960 in the Canadian magazine Star Weekly, illustrated by Gerry Sevier.

As How Right You Are, Jeeves, the story was featured in the 1976 collection Jeeves, Jeeves, Jeeves, which also included two other novels, Stiff Upper Lip, Jeeves and Jeeves and the Tie That Binds.

== Reception ==
- Charles Poore, The New York Times (28 June 1960): "It is fast and light, yet rich in the lineaments of human experience—usually presented with a touch of egg on its face... Mr. Wodehouse's plots make the most complex mechanisms being tossed into the air at Cape Canaveral seem rudimentary. The minute one solution to a problem at Brinkley Hall appears to be available it is capped by a new, a more nefarious ramification. It is only when the incomparable Jeeves returns from a brief vacation by the sea that an air of order begins to prevail".
- J. M. Richardson, Birmingham Daily Post (16 August 1960): "In a world characterised by change and uncertainty, the timeless and immutable inspire particular affection. P. G. Wodehouse wrote his first Jeeves story in 1916, inaugurated a fantastic popularity and now, more than forty years and sixty novels later, Jeeves is still shimmering to the breakfast table with the sizzling eggs and b.—and it's even funnier... No one can ever have devised a more idiosyncratic humour from more hackneyed components. The latest Jeeves is indeed vintage, although Jeeves himself is largely absent, being on holiday at Herne Bay for the shrimping, from whence he returns as a deus ex machina just in time to save Bertie".

However, Wodehouse biographer Richard Usborne complained that as a later novel, Jeeves in the Offing was not the author's best: "The plots creak a bit. Some of the writing is 'short'. Many of the images, quotations and verbal handsprings are recognizably old."

== Adaptations ==
This story was not adapted for any Jeeves and Wooster episode. An unabridged audiobook was produced by Audible narrated by Ian Carmichael.

== See also ==
- List of Jeeves characters, an alphabetical list of Jeeves characters
- List of P. G. Wodehouse characters in the Jeeves stories, a categorized outline of Jeeves characters
