= Ring for Jeeves =

1953 novel by P. G. Wodehouse

- First edition
- Author: P. G. Wodehouse
- Illustrator: R. M. Sax
- Language: English
- Series: Jeeves
- Genre: Comic novel
- Publisher: Herbert Jenkins (UK); Simon & Schuster (US)
- Publication date: 22 April 1953 (UK); 15 April 1954 (US)
- Publication place: United Kingdom
- Media type: Print
- Preceded by: The Mating Season
- Followed by: Jeeves and the Feudal Spirit

Ring for Jeeves is a novel by P. G. Wodehouse, first published in the United Kingdom on 22 April 1953 by Herbert Jenkins, London and in the United States on 15 April 1954 by Simon & Schuster, New York, under the title The Return of Jeeves.

The novel features one of Wodehouse's best-known characters, Jeeves. It is the only Jeeves novel in which his employer, Bertie Wooster, does not appear (though he is mentioned), and the only Jeeves story narrated in the third person. Wodehouse adapted the story from a play, Come On, Jeeves, that he had written with his lifelong friend and collaborator Guy Bolton.

Set in the early 1950s, the story concerns Bill Belfry, Lord Rowcester, an English aristocrat who is in financial trouble. His future relies on the problem-solving abilities of Jeeves, who is temporarily serving as Bill's butler.

== Plot ==
The novel is set in the early 1950s, when much of the English aristocracy has lost its wealth. Bertie has gone to a school that teaches the aristocracy to fend for itself, in case he meets the same fate. He is not allowed to bring Jeeves, so Jeeves goes to work temporarily for one of Bertie's friends from the Drones Club, the young gentleman Lord William "Bill" Rowcester (or Towcester), a now impoverished aristocrat who lives at Rowcester Abbey, a large house in poor repair.

The wealthy American widow Mrs. Rosalinda Spottsworth wants a new home in England. Bill's sister, Lady Monica "Moke" Carmoyle, has persuaded her to look at Rowcester Abbey. On her way, Mrs. Spottsworth meets her old friend Captain Biggar. Captain Biggar loves Mrs. Spottsworth but feels a man of modest means should not propose to a wealthy woman. Captain Biggar is also looking for a bookie named Honest Patch Perkins, who wears a check suit and eyepatch and has a large moustache. This bookmaker owes Captain Biggar over three thousand pounds after Captain Biggar won a lucky double.

Monica arrives, with her aristocratic husband Sir Roderick "Rory" Carmoyle, who now works at a department store. Jill Wyvern, a veterinary physician and Bill's fiancée, greets Monica and Rory, telling them that Bill has hired a cook, a housemaid, and a butler named Jeeves. Bill told Jill that he has secured a lucrative position with the Agricultural Board. Later, Bill returns to the house, wearing an eyepatch and false moustache. Following advice from Jeeves, Bill actually made his money as the Silver Ring bookmaker Honest Patch Perkins. (On a racecourse, the silver ring is the cheapest area where the bookmakers deal in the lowest stakes.) Jeeves was Bill's clerk, though he ignored Jeeves's advice against accepting Captain Biggar's wager. Bill hides his costume in an oak dower chest. He is hopeful after learning from Jeeves that Mrs. Spottsworth may buy the house.

Mrs. Spottsworth returns Captain Biggar's obvious feelings for her, but wonders why he remains silent. At Rowcester Abbey, she approaches Bill, who is her old friend. After Mrs. Spottsworth mentions her interest in the supernatural, Monica tells her that a ghost named Lady Agatha haunts the ruined chapel. Captain Biggar, who got the license plate number of the bookie's car, comes to the house and questions Bill. Jeeves maintains that it was a false plate. Hoping to show off the costumes inside the dower chest to Mrs. Spottsworth, Monica opens the chest and finds Bill's bookie costume. Captain Biggar recognizes it.

"My reason for screaming, m'lord, was merely to add verisimilitude. I supposed that that was how a delicately nurtured lady would be inclined to react on receipt of such a piece of information."
"Well, I wish you hadn't. The top of my head nearly came off."
"I am sorry, m'lord. But it was how I saw the scene. I felt it, felt it here," said Jeeves, tapping the left side of his waistcoat.

— Jeeves and Bill rehearse the spider sequence

Jeeves explains to Captain Biggar that Bill does not have the money yet. However, Captain Biggar needs the money quickly to back a horse named Ballymore at The Derby the next day, so that he will be wealthy enough to propose to Mrs. Spottsworth. Captain Biggar tells Bill to steal Mrs. Spottsworth's diamond pendant; Captain Biggar will pawn it and then buy it back after Ballymore wins. Jeeves advises Bill to pretend to remove a spider from Mrs. Spottsworth's hair while actually taking the pendant. After Jeeves and Bill rehearse the sequence, Bill tries it, but the pendant falls down the front of Mrs. Spottsworth's dress. At Captain Biggar's suggestion, Bill dances with Mrs. Spottsworth so that the necklace will fall to the ground. The sight of them makes Jill jealous. Rory spots the fallen pendant and returns it to Mrs. Spottsworth.

In the middle of the night, Jeeves tells Bill his new plan: Jeeves will tell Mrs. Spottsworth that Bill saw the ghost in the chapel, and while she goes there with Jeeves, Bill will take the pendant from her room. Following the plan, Bill steals the pendant, and Captain Biggar pawns it. Jill, who saw Bill leaving Mrs. Spottsworth's room, ends their engagement, and tells her father Colonel Wyvern, the chief constable. She reconciles with Bill after Jeeves tells her what happened. Colonel Wyvern confronts Bill, but sees the couple has reconciled, and instead investigates the stolen pendant, reported by the housemaid Ellen. Over the radio, it is announced that Ballymore lost the Derby.

Captain Biggar returns, with Mrs. Spottsworth's pendant, which he could not bring himself to pawn. He returns it to her and confesses his feelings. They become engaged. Though she loves the house, Mrs. Spottsworth dislikes the English climate; Jeeves suggests she buy the house, take it down, and rebuild it in California. She agrees to buy the house. Bill and Jill are thrilled, though dismayed that Jeeves is leaving, as Jeeves states that he is needed at Bertie Wooster's side. Bertie has been expelled from his school for cheating.

== Characters ==
- William 'Bill' Belfry (pseudonym Honest Patch Perkins), 9th Earl of Rowcester.
- Jeeves, temporarily employed as the Earl's butler.
- Sir Roderick 'Rory' Carmoyle, brother-in-law to Bill.
- Lady Monica 'Moke' Carmoyle, sister of Bill and wife of Rory.
- Jill Wyvern, betrothed to Bill.
- Chief Constable Wyvern, Jill's father.
- Cuthbert Gervase 'Bwana' Brabazon-Biggar, who has been cheated of £3000 by bookie Honest Patch Perkins.
- Rosalinda 'Rosie' Spottsworth, who is an old friend of Bill and is planning to buy his house.
- Pomona, Rosie's dog.
- Bulstrode, Chief Constable Wyvern's incompetent sixteen year old butler.
- Evangeline Trelawny, Chief Constable Wyvern's pigtailed, fifteen year old cook.
- Bertie Wooster (mentioned only) Jeeves' former employer.

== Differences between editions ==
Although the story remains the same, there are some differences between the UK and US editions. Structurally, the sequence of early chapters is different: what is the opening chapter of the UK edition becomes chapter 5 in the US edition, with other chapters being re-arranged accordingly. And while the US edition retains the name Towcester (pronounced "toaster") from the play which preceded the novel, this becomes Rowcester (pronounced "roaster") in the UK edition. Additionally, Sir Roderick Carmoyle's employer, Harrods, is replaced in the UK edition with the fictional department store Harrige's, a portmanteau of Harrods and Selfridges.

== Style ==
Jeeves's learning and intelligence are sometimes exaggerated for comic effect in the stories, for instance when he recites unnecessary quotations. This is most apparent in Ring for Jeeves, where Bertie is not present to supply comedic narration. Jeeves's verbosity and tendency to quote provide more of the story's humour than in other Jeeves novels.

Throughout the stories, Jeeves is sometimes compared to Sherlock Holmes and behaves like him, as when Jeeves remarks to Bill, "The problem is undoubtedly one that presents certain points of interest, m'lord" (chapter 13).

In the story, Captain Biggar resists proposing to Mrs. Spottsworth because of his idea of a Far Eastern Code, which is based on clichéd and outdated Kipling imagery. He ultimately realizes his Code is inadequate after talking with Mrs. Spottsworth near the end of the novel.

The names of Wodehouse's characters and locations often serve as a source of humour. In Ring for Jeeves, the name of Captain Biggar leads to a series of jokes, such as "Which is bigger, Captain Biggar or Mrs. Biggar?–Mrs. Biggar, because she became bigger." Captain Biggar is also given a humorously aristocratic full name, Cuthbert Gervase Brabazon Biggar.

In chapter 11 of the novel, Jeeves offers to remain with Bill even if Bill cannot pay his salary, implying that he would make the same offer to Bertie if Bertie's finances were threatened. As stated by writer Kristin Thompson, "In an indirect way, Jeeves's offer, along with Bertie's refusal to allow himself to be taught how to get along without Jeeves, adds up to a reaffirmation of their marriagelike relationship comparable to that of the end of Thank You, Jeeves."

Wodehouse references the horse race with Ballymore losing by a nose to Moke the Second in Cocktail Time.

== Publication history ==
In addition to being published as a novel, Ring for Jeeves was printed in the Long Island Sunday Press on 4 October 1953. Under the title The Return of Jeeves, the story was published in the magazine Ladies' Home Journal in April 1954, illustrated by Haddon Sundblom, and later appeared in Pocket Books Weekly in January 1955. The Return of Jeeves was included in the Wodehouse collection Five Complete Novels published by the American publisher Avenel Books in 1983.

== Adaptations ==
=== Television ===
This story was not adapted for any Jeeves and Wooster episode.

=== Radio ===
A 1955 BBC Light Programme radio drama adapted from Ring for Jeeves featured Deryck Guyler as Jeeves, Ian Carmichael as Bill, Tucker McGuire as Mrs. Spottsworth, Michael Shepley as Captain Biggar, George Merritt as Sir Roderick Carmoyle, Annabel Maule as Lady Monica Carmoyle, Belle Chrystall as Jill Wyvern, Mairhi Russell as Ellen the housemaid, Brian Haines as the chief constable Colonel Smithers [sic], Geoffrey Matthews as the radio commentator, John Ruddock as a waiter, and Bryan Powley as Pomona, the Pekingese.

In 2014, BBC Radio 4 aired a two-part adaptation of the novel, with Martin Jarvis as Jeeves and Jamie Bamber as Bill. The cast also included Rufus Sewell as Rory, Joanne Whalley as Monica, Glenne Headly as Mrs. Spottsworth, Ian Ogilvy as Captain Biggar, Moira Quirk as Jill, Daisy Hydon as Ellen, Christopher Neame as Colonel Wyvern, Darren Richardson as Bulstrode, and Matthew Wolf as the commentator.
