= List of Jeeves characters =

The following is a list of recurring and notable fictional characters featured in the Jeeves novels and short stories by P. G. Wodehouse.

== Anatole ==
Anatole is a recurring fictional character in the Jeeves stories, being the supremely skilled French chef of Aunt Dahlia at her country house Brinkley Court. He is mentioned in many of the stories and is often praised as "God's gift to the gastric juices". A small, rotund man, Anatole has a large moustache; Bertie Wooster notes that the ends of Anatole's moustache turn up when he is happy and droop when he is upset. Originally from Provence, Anatole speaks English with a mixed fluency, having learned much of his English from Bingo Little and an American chauffeur from Brooklyn.

Anatole previously worked for the Littles but entered Aunt Dahlia's employment in "Clustering Round Young Bingo". The only cook known to be able to make food that agrees with Tom Travers's digestion, he was relied on to such an extent that Tom Travers postponed a Mediterranean trip because Anatole was ill with influenza in "The Spot of Art". Anatole is described as being temperamental, to the point of nearly resigning in Right Ho, Jeeves when several people at the dinner table push his food away in bids to catch their loved ones' attention.

Many characters esteem Anatole's cooking and try to hire him away from the Travers household, including Jane Snettisham ("The Love That Purifies"), Sir Watkyn Bassett (The Code of the Woosters), and Mrs. Trotter (Jeeves and the Feudal Spirit). In Much Obliged, Jeeves, Bertie comments that Anatole suffers from "bouts of what he calls mal au foie" (liver problems) and is "inclined to the long monologue" on the subject.

== Rosie M. Banks ==
Rosie M. Banks is a recurring fictional character in the Jeeves stories, being an author who writes romance novels. She also appears in Drones Club stories outside the Jeeves canon. She is married to Bingo Little.

== Madeline Bassett ==
Madeline Bassett is a recurring fictional character in the Jeeves stories. She is the daughter of Sir Watkyn Bassett and is a rather mushy, sentimental girl. Bertie Wooster is briefly engaged to her.

== Watkyn Bassett ==
Sir Watkyn Bassett, CBE, is a fictional character who appears in two Jeeves novels. He is the father of Madeline Bassett, and the uncle and guardian of Stephanie "Stiffy" Byng. He wears a pince-nez, and is described as a small man who makes up for his height by wearing clothes that are striking in appearance, including a prismatic checked suit in The Code of the Woosters. In Stiff Upper Lip, Jeeves, he wears a striking dressing-grown. As Bertie states regarding Bassett, "He was a small man ... you got the impression, seeing him, that when they were making magistrates there wasn't enough material left over when they came to him ... and for some reason not easy to explain it nearly always happens that the smaller the ex-magistrate, the louder the dressing-grown. His was a bright purple number with yellow frogs, and I am not deceiving my public when I say that it smote me like a blow, rendering me speechless."

When he first meets Bertie Wooster, Sir Watkyn is the magistrate at Bosher Street Police Court. Shortly afterward, he inherits a great deal of money from a distant relative and retires to live in Totleigh Towers, where he is a Justice of the Peace. Stiffy complains that he "holds a sort of Star Chamber court in the library" when she causes trouble and fines her unfair amounts, which Bertie sympathises with. As a magistrate, Bassett fined Bertie £5 for stealing a policeman's helmet on Boat Race Night, and Bertie thinks that the fortune Sir Watkyn inherited actually derived from pocketing fines while a magistrate. Sir Watkyn is a noted collector of antique silver, and his collection rivals that of Bertie's uncle, Tom Travers. Each tries to obtain the silver cow-creamer in The Code of the Woosters. In that novel, it is mentioned that Sir Watkyn is engaged to a widow named Mrs. Wintergreen. She is the aunt of Sir Watkyn's friend, Roderick Spode, who is often at Totleigh Towers. However, she is not mentioned again. In Stiff Upper Lip, Jeeves, he obtains a black amber statuette.

In the Jeeves and Wooster television series adapted from Wodehouse's stories, Sir Watkyn is Florence Craye's uncle, as well as Stiffy Byng's in the original Jeeves's canon.

== Biffy Biffen ==
Charles Edward "Biffy" Biffen is a fictional character who appears in the Jeeves short story, "The Rummy Affair of Old Biffy". An absent-minded friend of Bertie Wooster, Biffy is engaged to a woman named Mabel, who is Jeeves's niece.

== Rupert Bingley ==
Rupert Bingley, also known as Brinkley, is a recurring fictional character who appears in two Jeeves novels. He is a smallish man who is thin in his first appearance but has become plump by his second appearance. In his first appearance in Thank You, Jeeves, he is a valet called Brinkley. He has extreme left-wing views and threatens Bertie Wooster. In Much Obliged, Jeeves, Jeeves informs Bertie that his name is Bingley and not Brinkley. By the time of this novel, Bingley has inherited a large sum of money and retired from being a valet. His views become extremely right-wing after he becomes a man of property. He resorts to theft and blackmail to increase his wealth. Bingley is a member of the Junior Ganymede Club and retains his membership after retiring.

As a valet, he was employed at different times by Ginger Winship, L. P. Runkle, and Bertie Wooster.

== Mr Blumenfeld ==
Blumenfeld is a recurring fictional character in the Jeeves stories. His name first appears as "Blumenfield" in "Jeeves and the Chump Cyril" (in The Inimitable Jeeves) but is later "Blumenfeld" in "Episode of the Dog McIntosh" (in Very Good, Jeeves). He is an American theatrical manager with a young son. Neither of their first names are stated, though Bertie Wooster jokingly calls Blumenfeld's unfriendly son "Sidney the Sunbeam".

Blumenfeld was inspired by Abraham Lincoln Erlanger, a dictatorial American theatrical producer who produced the 1916 musical Miss Springtime, which Wodehouse contributed to as lyricist. Erlanger employed a twelve-year-old boy to second-guess his creative judgments, on the grounds that this was the mental age of the average Broadway audience; this is similar to Blumenfeld, who relies on the opinions of his twelve-year-old son for the same reason.

== Butterfield ==
Butterfield is the butler of Totleigh Towers, Sir Watkyn Bassett's country house located in Totleigh-in-the-Wold. Butterfield's first name is not stated in the novels. In Stiff Upper Lip, Jeeves, Bertie Wooster guesses that Butterfield is a hundred and four years old, and Jeeves agrees that he is "well stricken in years". In The Code of the Woosters, while airing Stiffy Byng's dog Bartholomew, Butterfield sees Bertie drop Constable Oates's helmet out of a window and retrieves it. At the end of Stiff Upper Lip, Jeeves, Bertie agrees to let Jeeves give Butterfield his blue Alpine hat with a pink feather, which Butterfield thinks will help him court a widowed lady in the village.

== Stiffy Byng ==
Stephanie "Stiffy" Byng is a recurring fictional character in the Jeeves stories. The niece and ward of Sir Watkyn Bassett, she initially lives with him in Totleigh Towers. She is short and has “large blue eyes.” She wears a wind-swept hairstyle, and has an Aberdeen Terrier named Bartholomew. Stiffy often gets bright ideas that end up making trouble for others, and she is not above using blackmail to induce Bertie Wooster to do errands for her.

In The Code of the Woosters, she is engaged to the Rev. Harold "Stinker" Pinker. She appears with Harold Pinker in Stiff Upper Lip, Jeeves and they have married by Much Obliged, Jeeves.

== Stilton Cheesewright ==
G. D'Arcy "Stilton" Cheesewright is a recurring fictional character in two Jeeves novels, being an intermittent but jealous fiancé of Florence Craye and thus a menacing "rival" of Florence's ex-"fiancé" Bertie Wooster (who does not actually want to marry Florence). His nickname is probably derived from Stilton cheese. A member of the Drones Club, Stilton is a hulking chap with a large head compared to a pumpkin and a face that looks like "a slab of pink dough". Stilton went to private school, Eton and Oxford with Bertie. He was Captain of the Boats at Eton and rowed four years for Oxford.

In Joy in the Morning, Stilton was the local policeman at Aunt Agatha's rural village Steeple Bumpleigh and was engaged to Florence Craye who was in residence there. In this novel, Stilton and Florence temporarily end their engagement because she does not want him to be a policeman. They reconcile after Stilton resigns from the police force when the local Justice of the Peace refuses to let him make an arrest. In Jeeves and the Feudal Spirit, the engagement between Stilton and Florence is threatened because Stilton refuses to grow a moustache and Florence goes to a night club with Bertie. Stilton leaves Florence for good and becomes romantically interested in the novelist Daphne Dolores Morehead.

Stilton is mentioned in Pearls, Girls and Monty Bodkin: "Strong language was no novelty to [Monty] – he had once been present when somebody had slammed a car door on the finger of D'Arcy ('Stilton') Cheesewright of the Drones".

In the television series Jeeves and Wooster, Daphne Dolores Morehead does not appear but is impersonated by Jeeves in drag. Stilton falls in love with this "Daphne Dolores Morehead", and is never made aware that this was actually Jeeves and not the real Morehead in the episode. Stilton goes to New York City at the end of the episode, having heard that Daphne Dolores Morehead lives there.

== Lord Chuffnell ==
Marmaduke, Lord Chuffnell, nicknamed Chuffy, is a fictional character in the Jeeves novel, Thank You, Jeeves. He went to private school, Eton and Oxford with Bertie Wooster. Chuffy is a Drones Club member. He becomes engaged to Pauline Stoker, and they have married by Stiff Upper Lip, Jeeves.

Chuffy's aunt, Myrtle, Dowager Lady Chuffnell, appears in Thank You, Jeeves. She has a young son, Seabury, and is romantically involved with Sir Roderick Glossop. Her engagement to Glossop is threatened but saved in "Jeeves and the Greasy Bird".

In the television series Jeeves and Wooster, Myrtle is Chuffy's sister, Mrs Pongleton, and her son Seabury is therefore Chuffy's nephew.

== Clementina ==
Clementina is a fictional character in the Jeeves short story, "Jeeves and the Kid Clementina". Exactly thirteen years old, she is Bobbie Wickham's cousin and attends a school in Bingley-on-sea run by a friend of Aunt Agatha. Upon their first meeting, Bertie believes her to be "a quiet, saintlike child" who is both clean and a sympathetic listener, however his opinion changes upon finding out that "this young excrescence" is fond of pulling practical jokes, like her elder cousin, such as filling inkpots with sherbet.

In their brief interaction, Jeeves teaches her how to make a rabbit with a handkerchief.

== Edwin Craye ==
The Hon. Edwin Craye is a fictional character in the Jeeves stories. The fourteen-year-old son of Lord Worplesdon and younger brother of Lady Florence Craye, he is a bothersome Boy Scout who seeks to perform "daily acts of kindness", though he is more concerned with performing daily acts than actually being helpful. He always causes trouble for others with his meddlesome actions, especially after he has fallen behind with his daily acts of kindness and is trying to catch up. He appears in "Jeeves Takes Charge" and Joy in the Morning.

A prototype of Edwin Craye appears in the Reggie Pepper story "Disentangling Old Percy". This early version of Edwin is a meek adult. He has the title Lord Weeting in the British edition of the story.

== Florence Craye ==
Lady Florence Craye is a recurring fictional character in the Jeeves stories, being the beautiful, intellectual and serious daughter of Percy Craye, Lord Worplesdon.

A novelist, in Jeeves and the Feudal Spirit (1954), she is engaged to Oxford-educated muscular ex-policeman G. D'Arcy Cheesewright.

== Gussie Fink-Nottle ==
Augustus "Gussie" Fink-Nottle is a recurring fictional character in the Jeeves stories. He is a teetotaller and studies newts.

== Boko Fittleworth ==
George Webster "Boko" Fittleworth is a fictional character in a Jeeves novel, being an author with a unique dress sense, a member of the Drones Club, and a good friend of Bertie Wooster. In Joy in the Morning, even the normally unflappable Jeeves was strongly affected at the sight of Boko, who dresses "like a tramp cyclist". According to Bertie, after Jeeves first saw him, Jeeves winced and tottered off to the kitchen, probably to pull himself together with cooking sherry. Boko is engaged to Zenobia "Nobby" Hopwood. He once shared a flat with Harold "Ginger" Winship and employed Magnolia Glendennon as his stenographer, as mentioned in Much Obliged, Jeeves.

== Barmy Fotheringay-Phipps ==
Cyril "Barmy" Fotheringay-Phipps is a fictional character in the Jeeves universe. He is a member of the Drones club, among whose members he is variously reputed to have "the intelligence of a backward clam" or "considered to be a dangerous intellectual.

== Tuppy Glossop ==
Hildebrand "Tuppy" Glossop is a recurring fictional character in the Jeeves stories. The nephew of Sir Roderick Glossop, Tuppy is a Drones Club member and the fiancé of Bertie Wooster's cousin, Angela Travers.

== Honoria Glossop ==
Honoria Glossop is a recurring fictional character in the Jeeves stories. She is the athletic and brainy daughter of Sir Roderick Glossop.

== Lady Glossop ==
Lady Glossop is a fictional character in the Jeeves stories, being the wife of well known nerve specialist Sir Roderick Glossop, mother to Oswald and Honoria, and an acquaintance of Bertie's fearsome Aunt Agatha. She is mentioned but does not appear in the stories, and dies before the events of Thank You, Jeeves.

In the first and second seasons of the television series Jeeves and Wooster, Lady Glossop makes appearances, and entertains as much suspicion of Bertie's sanity as her husband. In the fourth season, Jeeves instead states to Bertie that Lady Glossop eloped with a bus conductor, and also says that Sir Roderick was anxious to remarry.

== Roderick Glossop ==
Sir Roderick Glossop is a recurring fictional character in the comic novels of P. G. Wodehouse. He is the father of Oswald and Honoria, as well as the uncle of Tuppy Glossop. Sometimes referred to as "the noted nerve specialist" or "the loony doctor", he is a practitioner of psychiatry. He also appears in a Blandings Castle novel outside the Jeeves canon.

== Percy Gorringe ==
Percy Gorringe is a fictional character in a Jeeves novel, being a side-whiskered poet and writer, the stepson of newspaper owner Mr Trotter and the son of Mrs Trotter. He gets engaged to Florence Craye and is intent on producing her novel Spindrift as a play in Jeeves and the Feudal Spirit, but is dumped by Florence after the play is a flop, as mentioned in Much Obliged, Jeeves. He writes mystery novels under the name Rex West.

== Agatha Gregson ==
Agatha Gregson (née Wooster, later Lady Worplesdon) is a recurring fictional character in the Jeeves stories, being Bertie Wooster's aggressive, controlling, entirely disagreeable Aunt Agatha. One of Bertie's cousins refers to her as "the nephew crusher". It is her desire that Bertie should be married and to this end arranges an alliance with Honoria Glossop, which fails spectaularly. She is the mother of Thomas "Thos" Gregson.

== Thomas Gregson ==
Thomas "Thos" (sometimes written Thos.) Gregson is a recurring fictional character in the Jeeves stories. The troublesome son of Agatha Gregson and her first husband Spenser Gregson, he first appears in "Jeeves and the Impending Doom", in which he is being tutored by Bingo Little. His next appearance is in "The Love That Purifies". In this story, he is stated to be fourteen years old. In the novel The Mating Season, he procures the cosh that ultimately ends up in Jeeves's possession. Bertie mentions reluctantly taking his cousin Thos to the theatre at the request of his Aunt Agatha in several stories.

== Francis Heppenstall ==
The Reverend Francis Heppenstall is a recurring fictional character in the Jeeves stories. He is the vicar at the village church at Twing. He is one of the entries in "The Great Sermon Handicap", manages the annual village school treat in "The Purity of the Turf", and is the uncle of Mary Burgess in "The Metropolitan Touch". He also has two sons.

== Kipper Herring ==
Reginald "Kipper" Herring is a fictional character in a Jeeves novel, being a childhood friend of Bertie Wooster from Malvern House. In Jeeves in the Offing, Kipper is employed as a journalist at the Thursday Review, in which capacity he writes a scathing review of a book on preparatory schools by his former headmaster Aubrey Upjohn. He is engaged to the mischievous Bobbie Wickham.

== Jeeves ==
Reginald Jeeves, usually referred to as Jeeves, is a recurring fictional character in the eponymous stories, being the valet of Bertie Wooster.

== Bingo Little ==
Richard P. "Bingo" Little is a recurring fictional character in the Jeeves stories. A member of the Drones Club and a close friend of Bertie Wooster, Bingo often falls in love in the early stories. Bingo also appears in Drones Club stories outside the Jeeves canon.

== Mortimer Little ==
Mortimer Little, later Lord Bittlesham, is a fictional character appearing in the Jeeves semi-novel, The Inimitable Jeeves. He devotes himself almost entirely to eating and is very fat. He is the uncle of Bingo Little, who is dependent upon him for an allowance. In "Jeeves Exerts the Old Cerebellum", Bingo's stratagem, suggested by Jeeves, to get his allowance increased backfires by inducing Old Mr. Little to marry his cook, Miss Watson. He acquires the title Lord Bittlesham by the time he appears in "Comrade Bingo", and also appears in "Bingo and the Little Woman".

== Daphne Dolores Morehead ==
Daphne Dolores Morehead is a fictional character in a Jeeves novel, Jeeves and the Feudal Spirit. She is a young and attractive blonde bestselling novelist. Blue-eyed and curvaceous, she turned the head of Stilton Cheesewright, making him forget about his ex-fiancée Florence Craye and so-called rival Bertie Wooster. She is probably based on Daphne du Maurier.

In the Jeeves and Wooster television series, Morehead herself does not appear. Instead, she is impersonated by Jeeves.

== Constable Oates ==
Police Constable Eustace Oates is a recurring fictional character in the Jeeves stories. He is a police officer at Totleigh-in-the-Wold. He is bitten by Stiffy Byng's dog Bartholomew and gets his helmet stolen in The Code of the Woosters, and arrests Bertie in Stiff Upper Lip, Jeeves.

== Gwladys Pendlebury ==
Gwladys Pendlebury is a fictional character appearing in the Jeeves short story, "The Spot of Art" (collected in Very Good, Jeeves). A portrait painter, she meets Bertie Wooster at a party in Chelsea. Though Bertie is initially in love with her, she ultimately gets engaged to Lucius Pim, whom she injured with her car. Her portrait of Bertie is used in soup advertisements.

== Lucius Pim ==
Lucius Pim is a fictional character appearing in the Jeeves short story, "The Spot of Art". He has five brothers and a sister, Beatrice Slingsby. He is an artist and is initially Bertie Wooster's wavy-haired rival for the affections of fellow artist Gwladys Pendlebury. His leg is injured when he is struck by a car driven by Gwladys, and he is brought to recuperate in Bertie's flat by Gwladys's request. Soon enough, he and Gwladys become engaged. Acting as her agent, he obtains a satisfactory price for her portrait of Bertie.

== Stinker Pinker ==
The Reverend Harold "Stinker" Pinker is a recurring fictional character in the Jeeves stories. He went to Oxford with Bertie Wooster. He boxed and played rugby football at Oxford, and later played rugby for England. A kindly and muscular individual, he is described by Bertie as being "a large, lumbering Newfoundland puppy of a chap". Stiffy Byng refers to him as an example of Muscular Christianity. He is prone to tripping and knocking over tables. Bertie says that he "had always been constitutionally incapable of walking through the great Gobi desert without knocking something over".

A curate at Totleigh-in-the-Wold, he is engaged to Stiffy Byng in The Code of the Woosters, appears with her again in Stiff Upper Lip, Jeeves in which he becomes vicar and the prop forward of the local rugby team at Hockley-cum-Meston, and is mentioned as performing well for the team in Aunts Aren't Gentlemen.

== Major Plank ==
Major Plank is a recurring fictional character in the Jeeves stories. He was called "Barmy" Plank at school. An elderly and square-faced man, he is an explorer who lives in the village of Hockley-cum-Meston, in a house he inherited from his godfather. Devoted to rugby football, he sometimes has memory trouble due to malaria. He sells an amber statuette he obtained in the Congo to Sir Watkyn Bassett and meets the so-called Alpine Joe in Stiff Upper Lip, Jeeves. He sees Alpine Joe again in Aunts Aren't Gentlemen.

Major Plank may be the Major Brabazon-Plank who appears in the earlier Uncle Fred novel outside the Jeeves canon, Uncle Dynamite.

== Catsmeat Potter-Pirbright ==
Claude Cattermole "Catsmeat" Potter-Pirbright is a fictional character in the Jeeves stories. He is a West End actor, a member of the Drones Club, and the brother of Cora "Corky" Potter-Pirbright. Catsmeat also appears in Drones Club stories outside the Jeeves canon.

== Oofy Prosser ==
Alexander Charles "Oofy" Prosser is a fictional character mentioned in several Jeeves stories. Being the millionaire member of the Drones Club, he is also a friend of Bertie Wooster. The most wealthy and envied member of the Club, his nickname "Oofy" is British slang for "wealthy".

Oofy Prosser appears briefly in several episodes of the Jeeves and Wooster television series. For instance, he and fellow Drone Barmy Fotheringay-Phipps develop a dance inspired by Gussie Fink-Nottle's demonstration of newt courtship in "The Hunger Strike", and he and Barmy bet each other on how long they can go without smoking, with each trying to smoke in secret in Bertie's flat, in "Will Anatole Return to Brinkley Court?".

== Lord Rowcester ==
Bill Belfry, 9th Earl of Rowcester (pronounced "roaster"), is a fictional character introduced in the novel Ring for Jeeves, in which he is the impoverished owner of the near-derelict Rowcester Abbey in Southmoltonshire. He has a sister, Monica "Moke" Carmoyle, and was a Commando in WWII.

In post-WWII Britain, Jeeves temporarily becomes valet to Lord Rowcester whilst Bertie Wooster is away at a school to teach the wealthy classes how to survive in the wake of social revolution. Lord Rowcester, engaged to be married to Jill Wyvern, wishes to find means of earning money to repair his home and thus sell it off to live a happy married life. At the suggestion of Jeeves, Bill sets up as a bookmaker at horse races under the title of Honest Patch Perkins.

== Mrs Scholfield ==
Mrs. Scholfield is a fictional character who is mentioned in the Jeeves short story "Bertie Changes His Mind". She is sister to Bertie Wooster, and apparently lives or spends some considerable portion of her time in India. She is never given a first name. Bertie and his sister seem to be on good terms, since Bertie considers buying a house where he can live with his sister and her three young daughters.

When asked by Chuffy in Thank You, Jeeves if he has any sisters, Bertie replies in the negative. This may be a continuity error, though Wodehouse scholars have proposed possible explanations for this inconsistency. Bertie may have preferred not to mention his sister since he was trying to convince Chuffy that he had kissed Pauline Stoker in a brotherly manner, Mrs. Scholfield might have died somewhere between the short story and the novel, or Bertie simply preferred not to discuss his family with a man who had threatened him with physical harm.

While Mrs. Scholfield does not appear in person in the original Jeeves canon, she was portrayed by actress Barbara French in an episode of The World of Wooster based on "Bertie Changes His Mind".

== Seppings ==
Seppings is a fictional character in the Jeeves stories. He is the butler of Dahlia Travers and Tom Travers at their country house, Brinkley Court. His first name is not given in the stories. He is a dignified and stoic figure, though he has been on friendly terms with Bertie Wooster since Bertie's boyhood. Bertie has enjoyed many a port in his pantry, and they sometimes have conversations, mainly about the weather and Seppings's lumbago. On one occasion, Bertie calls him "Pop Seppings" in a familiar manner.

He is employed alongside the supreme chef Anatole. Like many others, Seppings highly esteems Anatole's cooking. In Right Ho, Jeeves, Bertie describes Seppings when recalling Tuppy pushing away Anatole's cooking at dinner, stating that "Seppings, Aunt Dahlia's butler, a cold, unemotional man, had gasped and practically reeled when Tuppy waved aside those nonnettes de poulet Agnès Sorel". In the same novel, Bertie mentions that Seppings is fond of dances, and Bertie later has trouble getting his attention while Seppings is engrossed in dancing. Seppings makes a brief appearance in The Code of the Woosters, working at the Travers family's town house.

In Jeeves and the Feudal Spirit, Seppings discovers a missing pearl necklace in Jeeves's room, and draws this to Jeeves's attention before reporting it to anyone else. After he does report this, both Seppings and Aunt Dahlia are offended when Mrs Trotter suggests that Seppings stole it. During the events of Jeeves in the Offing, Seppings is away on holiday, at Bognor Regis. When he comes down with a temporary ailment of some sort in Stiff Upper Lip, Jeeves, Jeeves serves as Brinkley Court's substitute butler. Seppings suffers a bout of indigestion after eating too much of Anatole's cooking in Much Obliged, Jeeves, though he soon recovers.

Seppings, along with Bertie Wooster and Jeeves, is featured in the play Jeeves and Wooster in Perfect Nonsense (2013).

== Charlie Silversmith ==
Charlie Silversmith is a fictional character who appears in the Jeeves novel, The Mating Season. A large, imposing 16-stone man with a bald head, Silversmith is the austere butler at Deverill Hall. He is Jeeves's uncle and the father of Queenie, who is the parlourmaid at Deverill Hall and engaged to Constable Dobbs. In Much Obliged, Jeeves, Bertie Wooster says that he esteems few men more highly than Jeeves's Uncle Charlie, and when Jeeves is writing a letter to his uncle, Bertie says, "Give Uncle Charlie my love", to which Jeeves replies that he will.

== Sippy Sipperley ==
Oliver Randolph Sipperley, called "Sippy" by Bertie, is a recurring fictional character in the Jeeves stories. Sippy is a 24-year-old author who is financially dependent on his Aunt Vera. He is initially a freelance author in "Without the Option" but has become editor of The Mayfair Gazette in "The Inferiority Complex of Old Sippy". He recommends Jeeves's problem-solving abilities to Gussie Fink-Nottle in Right Ho, Jeeves.

== Roderick Spode ==
Roderick Spode, 7th Earl of Sidcup, often known as Spode or Lord Sidcup, is a recurring fictional character in the Jeeves novels. An "amateur dictator", he is aggressive and intimidating. Spode is usually a threat to Bertie Wooster.

== Rupert Steggles ==
Rupert Steggles is a fictional character in three linked Jeeves short stories in The Inimitable Jeeves. The only son of one of the biggest bookies in London, Steggles is an amateur bookmaker of dubious reputation. He is variously described as ferret-faced and rat-faced, and uses underhanded tactics to ensure that he profits from bookmaking. In "The Great Sermon Handicap", Steggles takes bets on the sermon duration of local clergymen near Twing Hall on a given Sunday. In "The Purity of the Turf", he organizes betting on the events at the Twing village school treat held on the grounds of Twing Hall. In "The Metropolitan Touch", Steggles takes bets on who will win the heart of Mary Burgess.

== J. Washburn Stoker ==
J. Washburn Stoker, a wealthy American, is a fictional character in the Jeeves novel, Thank You, Jeeves. His young son Dwight Stoker and daughter Pauline Stoker, to whom Bertie Wooster had once been engaged briefly and who later marries Lord Chuffnell, also appear. Stoker has another daughter, Emerald Stoker, who appears in Stiff Upper Lip, Jeeves.

== Rocky Todd ==
Rockmetteller "Rocky" Todd is a fictional character in the Jeeves stories. He is an American poet. Bertie mentions paying him a visit in "Jeeves and the Unbidden Guest". Rocky seeks help from Bertie and Jeeves in "The Aunt and the Sluggard". Both of these short stories are collected in Carry On, Jeeves.

== Angela Travers ==
Angela Travers is a fictional character in the Jeeves stories. She is the daughter of Dahlia Travers and Tom Travers, a cousin of Bertie Wooster, and the fiancée of Tuppy Glossop. She is mentioned in several stories and appears in the novel Right Ho, Jeeves. Bertie is very fond of her. When they were children, she used to call herself his little sweetheart.

== Dahlia Travers ==
Dahlia Travers (née Wooster) is a recurring fictional character in the Jeeves stories, being Bertie Wooster's bonhomous aunt, as well as the wife of Uncle Tom Travers and the mother of Angela Travers and Bonzo Travers. Aside from Bertie and Jeeves, Aunt Dahlia makes an appearance in more Jeeves stories than any other character, appearing in seven short stories and seven novels.

== Tom Travers ==
Thomas "Tom" Portarlington Travers is a recurring fictional character in the Jeeves stories. He is the husband of Dahlia Travers and thus Bertie Wooster's uncle. Travers, known to Bertie as Uncle Tom, made a fortune doing business in the Far East. Although reluctant to part with money, especially for income tax, he provides the funds for his wife’s rarely profitable magazine Milady's Boudoir, which he refers to as "Madame's Nightshirt". Travers also suffers from severe digestion problems, which are only allayed by the cooking of his French chef Anatole. Tom Travers's hobby is collecting old silver, in which his biggest rival is Sir Watkyn Bassett. Their rivalry forms a major part of the plot of The Code of the Woosters, in which they are both seeking to purchase a rare eighteenth-century cow creamer.

In addition to being mentioned in many stories, Uncle Tom appears in "Clustering Round Young Bingo", Right Ho, Jeeves, and Jeeves and the Feudal Spirit. Bertie gets a letter from him in Aunts Aren't Gentlemen.

== Mr Trotter ==
Mr Trotter (Lemuel Gengulphus Trotter) is a fictional character in a Jeeves novel, Jeeves and the Feudal Spirit. He is a newspaper owner from Liverpool, husband of the domineering Mrs Trotter, and stepfather of her son, the poet Percy Gorringe. Trotter is invited to Aunt Dahlia's country house Brinkley Court to decide on acquiring her literary journal, Milady's Boudoir.

== Mrs Trotter ==
Mrs Trotter is a fictional character who appears in one Jeeves novel, Jeeves and the Feudal Spirit, being the domineering and socially ambitious wife of Liverpool newspaper owner Mr Trotter and the mother by a former marriage of poet Percy Gorringe.

== Aubrey Upjohn ==
The Reverend Aubrey Upjohn is a fictional character who is mentioned in several Jeeves stories and appears in the novel Jeeves in the Offing. He was formerly the stern headmaster of Malvern House Preparatory School, the school attended by Bertie Wooster and several of his friends. Upjohn is 5' 7" tall, though he seemed to be 8' 6" tall to Bertie when Bertie was a child. In Jeeves in the Offing, Upjohn has retired and grown a moustache. He is the widower of Jane Mills, who was a friend of Aunt Dahlia, and stepfather of Jane's daughter Phyllis Mills. He hopes to stand for Parliament as the Conservative candidate in Market Snodsbury. He becomes the target of a libellous article by Kipper Herring. He threatens to initiate a litigation, but Jeeves, as usual, smooths things out. In some books the name of Bertie's headmaster is given as "Arnold Abney", but he appears to be the same person.

Aubrey Upjohn is also a minor Drones Club character. He is the headmaster of St. Asaph's preparatory school in Bramley-on-Sea, which Freddie Widgeon attended in the past, in "Bramley Is So Bracing". In the story, Freddie inadvertently leaves Bingo Little's baby in Upjohn's study. St. Asaph's may be another name for Malvern House.

Upjohn is mentioned in The Code of the Woosters, The Mating Season, and "Jeeves and the Greasy Bird". He is also mentioned in the Drones Club story "The Editor Regrets".

== Bobbie Wickham ==
Roberta "Bobbie" Wickham is a recurring fictional character in the Jeeves stories, being a redheaded girl enamoured of practical jokes. She also appears in Mr. Mulliner stories and other stories outside the Jeeves canon.

== Uncle Willoughby ==
Uncle Willoughby is a fictional character appearing in the Jeeves short story, "Jeeves Takes Charge". He is Bertie's uncle and resides in Easeby Hall; his surname is not stated. Bertie is initially financially dependent on Willoughby, though this is not true in later works. As he does not appear in later stories, it is speculated that Willoughby died and Bertie inherited from him. It is also possible that Willoughby was the trustee of Bertie's inheritance and Bertie obtained full access to his inheritance after reaching a certain age.

== Ginger Winship ==
Harold "Ginger" Winship is a fictional character appearing in the Jeeves novel, Much Obliged, Jeeves. He is a friend of Bertie Wooster and was Bertie's neighbor at Magdalen College at the University of Oxford. He has ginger hair and was a heavyweight boxer for Oxford. At one point, he is engaged to Florence Craye, though he ultimately marries Magnolia Glendennon. His former valet Brinkley was also Bertie's valet for a time when Jeeves had briefly left his service.

== Bertie Wooster ==
Bertram "Bertie" Wooster is a recurring fictional character in the Jeeves stories, being the master of said Jeeves.

== Claude and Eustace Wooster ==
Claude and Eustace Wooster are fictional characters in the Jeeves semi-novel The Inimitable Jeeves, being the cousins of Bertie Wooster and the twin sons of Henry Wooster and Emily Wooster. They appear in "Sir Roderick Comes to Lunch", "The Great Sermon Handicap" and "The Delayed Exit of Claude and Eustace". They are about half a dozen years younger than Bertie and are full of energy, able to stay out all night revelling; much to the dismay of the more subdued Bertie, who considers them "more or less generally admitted to be the curse of the human race". Introduced as students at Oxford, they steal a multitude of items in an effort to join the school's Seekers club - inadvertently breaking up Bertie's engagement to Honoria Glossop - and are later expelled for pouring soda water on the Senior Tutor. They later ship out to South Africa to join the firm of a family friend at Aunt Agatha's direction.

== Emily Wooster ==
Emily Wooster is a fictional character mentioned in one Jeeves semi-novel, The Inimitable Jeeves. She is Bertie Wooster's Aunt Emily, the widow of Henry Wooster, and the mother of Claude and Eustace Wooster.

== George Wooster ==
George Wooster, Lord Yaxley, is a fictional character in the Jeeves stories. He frequents many gentlemen's clubs, and is said to have discovered, well before modern medical thought, that alcohol was a food. He is Bertie's uncle and apparently inherits his title, as he seems unlikely to have earned it. He eventually marries an ex-barmaid. He plays an important role in "The Delayed Exit of Claude and Eustace" and appears in "Indian Summer of an Uncle".

== Henry Wooster ==
Henry Wooster is a fictional character mentioned in the Jeeves semi-novel The Inimitable Jeeves, being Bertie Wooster's Uncle Henry, and the brother of Bertie's late father. Though Bertie thought he was extremely decent, Uncle Henry did strange things like keep eleven pet rabbits in his bedroom. He ended up in some sort of home, though his sister, Bertie's Aunt Agatha, claims he was merely eccentric. He died sometime before the stories take place, leaving behind a wife, Emily Wooster, and his twin sons, Claude and Eustace Wooster.

Uncle Henry's story gives Sir Roderick Glossop concerns about Bertie Wooster's sanity in "Sir Roderick Comes to Lunch". He is likely the same Uncle Henry who gave Bertie the profitable tip that Bertie repeats to an audience of girls in "Bertie Changes His Mind".

== Lord Worplesdon ==
Percival "Percy" Craye, later Earl of Worplesdon, a shipping magnate, is a fictional character in the Jeeves stories. He has a daughter, Florence Craye, and a son, Edwin Craye. Lord Worplesdon is also the guardian of Zenobia "Nobby" Hopwood. He is a former employer of Jeeves, and later returns to Jeeves for advice. When stirred by a strong emotion, Worplesdon has a tendency to start shouting "What? What? What?" repeatedly.

He was nearly Agatha Gregson's first husband, though Agatha broke the engagement after he was thrown out of a Covent Garden ball and taken to Vine Street Police Station. After gaining the title Lord Worplesdon, he becomes her second husband and Bertie's Uncle Percy. He once chased the fifteen-year-old Bertie "for five miles across difficult terrain" with a hunting crop, after finding him smoking one of his special cigars. Worplesdon is later amused by the memory and gives one of his cigars to Bertie.

Lord Worplesdon was mentioned in the short story "Jeeves Takes Charge", in which it is stated that he was once thrown out of a music hall with Bertie Wooster's Uncle Willoughby. It is also said in this story that he sat down to breakfast one morning, cried "Eggs! Eggs! Damn all eggs!", and ran out of his house, "never again to return to the bosom of his family" – this incident is never referenced again, however. He later appears in Joy in the Morning, in which he wants to have a clandestine meeting with an American businessman, Chichester Clam. In the same novel, Nobby Hopwood obtains her guardian's permission to marry Boko Fittleworth.

An early version of the character appeared in the Reggie Pepper story, "Disentangling Old Percy". In this story, his first name is not given, though the younger of his two sons is named Percy (in the British edition of the story).

== See also ==
- List of P. G. Wodehouse characters in the Jeeves stories, a categorized outline of characters
- List of P. G. Wodehouse locations, a list of locations including those in the Jeeves stories
- List of Jeeves and Wooster characters, a list of characters in the television series
