= Ante-post betting =

Type of horse racing bet

In horse racing and greyhound racing, an ante-post bet is a bet placed before the racecourse's betting market has opened, in the expectation that the current price is more favorable than the price once that market opens. It generally covers any bet made before the day of the race. Ante-post rules usually apply until the final declaration stage, about 48 hours before the race, after which a withdrawn horse returns the stake rather than losing it. Unlike starting price betting, ante-post betting carries the additional risk that the stake is forfeited rather than returned if the selection fails to run.

Under a non-runner no bet concession, the bet is voided and the stake returned if the horse does not run. Such concessions are commonly offered by major bookmakers for high-profile events such as the Grand National and the Cheltenham Festival, usually at shorter odds than standard ante-post prices.

The ante in ante-post derives from the Latin ante ("before"), while the post does not come from the Latin post ("after"). It instead refers to the nineteenth-century Betting Post, a stake fixed on the course like a sign-post to mark the start of fixed betting, in front of which bettors queued in their carriages.

Ante-post bets make up only a small fraction of those placed with British bookmakers. Because bookmakers cannot fix their prices to racecourse prices, they set competing prices that often vary between firms, and bettors take the most favorable one. As a forward market, in which prices are set well before the event, the ante-post market has been studied in the economics of betting-market efficiency. Such bets are often less profitable for bookmakers but attract more press coverage because of the price variation.

In 2019 the online bookmaker BetBright voided customers' unsettled ante-post bets after selling its platform to 888 Holdings. After criticism the Cheltenham Festival bets were honoured and other positions were later taken on by BetVictor, an outcome the Gambling Commission considered acceptable.
