= Starting price =

Odds applicable on a horse race

In horse racing and greyhound racing, the starting price (SP) is the odds prevailing on a particular entry in the on-course fixed-odds betting market at the time a race begins. The method by which SPs are set for each runner varies in different countries but is generally by consensus of an appointed panel on the basis of their observations of the fluctuation in prices at the racetrack.

For British horseraces governed by the Starting Price Regulatory Commission (SPRC), the starting price is determined as follows:

For each horse in a race the prices on offer by all bookmakers in the sample are ordered into a list from longest to shortest. The list is then divided into two equal halves and the SP is the shortest odds available in the half containing the longest odds. The SP or a longer price will have been offered by at least half the bookmakers in the sample.

The selection of the sample is performed so that the sample size is an even number "wherever practically possible", since otherwise it would not be possible to divide the list into two equal halves. Only bookmakers that generate prices independently are considered, and those within the same ownership group are treated as a single sample. This method is very similar to the calculation of the median of the sampled prices, and the result is referred to as the median by the SPRC.

The principal function of a starting price is to determine returns on those winning bets where fixed odds have not been taken at the time the bet was struck.

Typically, on the day of the race, UK bookmakers offer a choice between placing a bet at SP, or taking a fixed price. When viewing future races, SP may be the only option available.

Some bookmakers offer best odds guaranteed, meaning that if a punter takes fixed odds on a race when the bet is struck and the SP turns out to be better (that is, higher), then if the punter wins, the payout is calculated using the SP. This is aimed at removing hesitancy among punters prompted by fears of taking what might prove to be a poor (that is, low) price before the race.

In the United Kingdom, the stake on an SP bet is returned if the entry is withdrawn before the race starts. For fixed-odds (ante-post) bets, the stake is retained by the bookmaker. Starting price provides a flexible way for punters to place their bets and potentially benefit from improved odds.

== Bibliography ==
- Waterman, Jack (1999). The Punter's Friend. Harpenden, Herts, UK: Queen Anne Press. ISBN 1852916001.
