= List of Jeeves and Wooster episodes =

Jeeves and Wooster is a British comedy series that originally aired from 1990 to 1993. The titles are taken from the DVD collections. All episodes run for approximately 50 minutes, and were written by Clive Exton.

The list includes the original British air dates for the series, and the U.S. air dates for episodes that also aired on the American anthology series Masterpiece Theatre. The order in which episodes were broadcast in the United States differs from the original broadcast order, and five episodes were not broadcast on Masterpiece Theatre but were included in American video releases.

== Series overview ==
Series	Episodes	Originally released	
Series	Episodes	First released	Last released
1	5	22 April 1990	20 May 1990
2	6	14 April 1991	19 May 1991
3	6	29 March 1992	3 May 1992
4	6	16 May 1993	20 June 1993

== Episodes ==
=== Series 1 (1990) ===
No. overall	No. in series	Title	Directed by	Adaptation of	Original release date	U.S. air date	Prod. code
1	1	"Jeeves' Arrival"	Robert Young	"Jeeves Takes Charge" (from Carry On, Jeeves) "Scoring off Jeeves" (from The Inimitable Jeeves "Sir Roderick Comes to Lunch" (from The Inimitable Jeeves)	22 April 1990	11 November 1990	101
Bertie Wooster's Aunt Agatha orders him to marry Honoria Glossop, whom Agatha believes will "reform" him. Bertie, not enamoured with the idea, finds that his friend Bingo Little is infatuated with her, but his scheme to get them together fails. His capable new valet Jeeves steps in with a plan to convince Sir Roderick and Lady Glossop that their potential son-in-law is unfit to marry their daughter. Wooster, with the reluctant assistance of Jeeves, performs "Minnie the Moocher". Also called "In Court after the Boat Race" or "Jeeves' Arrival".
2	2	"Tuppy and the Terrier"	Robert Young	"Jeeves and the Yule-tide Spirit" (from Very Good, Jeeves) "Episode of the Dog McIntosh" (from Very Good, Jeeves) "Jeeves and the Song of Songs" (from Very Good, Jeeves)	29 April 1990	18 November 1990	102
Bertie is determined to propose to Bobbie Wickham. When Barmy defeats him at golf, Bobbie recommends a water-bottle trick that backfires. Bertie is made to watch Aunt Agatha's over-pampered dog McIntosh and is horrified when Bobbie gives the dog to the spoilt son of a Broadway producer. Tuppy Glossop is infatuated with an opera singer, Cora Bellinger, and has dropped Bertie's cousin Angela. Her mother, Aunt Dahlia, wants this affair over with, and Jeeves produces a plan which involves Bertie singing in public. Wooster performs "Forty-Seven Ginger-Headed Sailors", a song from 1929, and is one of several characters to perform "Sonny Boy", a 1928 tear-jerker popularized by Al Jolson. Also called "Bertie Is in Love" or "The Golf Tournament".
3	3	"The Purity of the Turf"	Robert Young	"Indian Summer of an Uncle" (from Very Good, Jeeves) "The Purity of the Turf" (from The Inimitable Jeeves)	6 May 1990	25 November 1990	103
Bertie's Uncle George wishes to marry a young waitress. Aunt Agatha is dismayed and, through Bertie, attempts to offer the girl £100 to break off the engagement; instead, however, Bertie meets Maud Wilberforce, who has a connection with his uncle. Bertie visits Twing Hall, where Lady Wickhammersley has banned all gambling after Lord Wickhammersley lost the East Wing in a game of shove ha'penny the previous week, according to Jeeves. (It is also mentioned that a year ago, Lord Wickhammersley lost a car to Lord Ickenham as a result of gambling.) Rupert Steggles has surreptitiously arranged to take bets, however, on the events at a village fair. Bertie and Bingo place bets on the competitors, only to find that Steggles has rigged the events. Jeeves duly sorts things out. Wooster performs 'Good-night Vienna', a song from the similarly named 1932 film and radio show. Also called "The Village Sports Day at Twing" or "The Gambling Event".
4	4	"The Hunger Strike"	Robert Young	Right Ho, Jeeves	13 May 1990	2 December 1990	104
Aunt Dahlia coerces Bertie into handing out the prizes at Market Snodsbury Grammar School by threatening to withhold the services of her master chef, Anatole. Newt-fancier Gussie Fink-Nottle comes to Jeeves for advice about Madeline Bassett, of whom he is enamoured. Since she is staying at Brinkley Court with Aunt Dahlia, Bertie delegates Gussie to give the prizes. Bertie tries to sort out Tuppy Glossop and Angela Travers's relationship, Gussie and Madeline's relationship, and an issue Aunt Dahlia has with her husband — all without the help of Jeeves. Disaster ensues when he recommends that they go without dinner. Also called "How Does Gussie Woo Madeline?".
5	5	"Will Anatole Return to Brinkley Court?"	Robert Young	Right Ho, Jeeves	20 May 1990	9 December 1990	105
Jeeves returns to London to persuade Anatole to return to Brinkley Court, whereto Bertie subsequently goes to reconcile Angela Travers with Tuppy Glossop, who is growing increasingly suspicious and jealous of his relationship with her. In order to bolster Gussie Fink-Nottle's courage to deliver the prizes and propose to Madeline Bassett, both Bertie and Jeeves spike his orange juice. Jeeves finally sorts out all the fractured relationships with a plan to set off the fire alarm. Also called "Brinkley Manor" or "The Matchmaker".

=== Series 2 (1991) ===
No. overall	No. in series	Title	Directed by	Adaptation of	Original release date	U.S. air date	Prod. code
6	1	"Jeeves Saves the Cow-Creamer"	Simon Langton	The Code of the Woosters	14 April 1991	29 January 1995	201
Aunt Dahlia sends Bertie to "sneer" at an antique, silver cow-shaped creamer, to keep its price down so her husband can save money buying it. He accidentally brings the antique to the attention of rival collector Sir Watkyn Bassett, who buys it instead. Dahlia sends Bertie to get the creamer back at all costs. Amateur fascist dictator (and root-vegetable enthusiast) Sir Roderick Spode is appalled when he learns that Madeline Bassett is engaged to Gussie Fink-Nottle. Gussie is naturally terrified of Spode, and even the smallest misunderstanding will put his life in jeopardy. Jeeves finds a way to keep Spode from harming either Bertie or Gussie. Also called "The Silver Jug".
7	2	"The Bassetts' Fancy Dress Ball"	Simon Langton	The Code of the Woosters	21 April 1991	5 February 1995	202
Gussie Fink-Nottle has been keeping a notebook containing insulting observations on Sir Watkyn Bassett and Sir Roderick Spode, to keep his courage up about them. When he loses the notebook, he calls on Bertie to help find it. The Rev. Harold "Stinker" Pinker and Stephanie "Stiffy" Byng wish to marry but Stiffy's guardian Sir Watkyn doesn't approve. Stiffy blackmails Bertie into helping her convince her guardian otherwise. Bertie comes into possession of a policeman's helmet. Also called "A Plan for Gussie".
8	3	"Pearls Mean Tears"	Simon Langton	"Aunt Agatha Takes the Count" (from The Inimitable Jeeves) "The Rummy Affair of Old Biffy" (from Carry On, Jeeves)	28 April 1991	8 January 1995	203
At Westcombe-on-Sea, Aunt Agatha intends to engage Bertie to "a nice quiet girl" named Aline Hemmingway. Bertie is forced to spend time with Aline and her brother, Rev. Sidney Hemmingway but finds them dreary. After Sidney loses money at the races, he borrows £100 from Bertie with Aline's pearl necklace on deposit. Coincidentally, Aunt Agatha's pearl necklace goes missing. Charles Edward "Biffy" Biffen cannot find a girl to whom he was engaged. He comes to Jeeves for help but Jeeves, who happens to be the girl's uncle, misunderstands Biffy's intentions and is reluctant to help. Bertie performs 'Sunny Disposish'. The "Victoria Hotel" and the "Hotel Riviera" in Westcombe-on-Sea ("Pearls Mean Tears") were filmed in Sidmouth, Devon. Also called "The Con".
9	4	"Chuffy"	Simon Langton	Thank You, Jeeves	5 May 1991	15 January 1995	204
Bertie's insistence on playing the trombone drives Jeeves to give notice. Bertie hires a less satisfactory valet, Brinkley. Bertie's friend, Lord "Chuffy" Chuffnell, quickly snaps Jeeves up. Bertie rents a country cottage from Chuffy in Chuffy's family-owned village of Chuffnell Regis in Devon and practices his trombone. Chuffy is intent on selling Chuffnell Hall to J. Washburn Stoker, so that he can afford to marry Stoker's daughter Pauline. He discovers, to his concern, that Pauline was once engaged to Bertie—and that Washburn wants Bertie to stay away from his daughter. Jeeves produces a plan to get Pauline and Chuffy together that results in the burning down of Bertie's cottage. Sympathetic to Bertie, Jeeves resumes working for him at the end of the episode. The seaside part of the Chuffnell Regis village scenes (beach, jetty, steep hillside cottages) were filmed in Clovelly, Devon. The thatched cottage village scenes were filmed elsewhere. Chuffnell Hall scenes were filmed at Wrotham Park in Hertfordshire. Also called "Jeeves in the Country".
10	5	"Kidnapped!"	Simon Langton	Thank You, Jeeves	12 May 1991	N/A	205
Bertie's club, the Drones, is electing a new dining committee chairman. Bertie wishes to be elected but discovers that no one with a criminal record can stand. Pauline Stoker is being stalked by a mysterious stranger. Bertie, always chivalrous, is called upon to protect her on her way back to Chuffnell Regis. The trip results in startling results, including an encounter with several Drones as black-faced minstrels. Because Chuffy cannot get permission to turn Chuffnell Hall into a hotel, Pauline tries to persuade Sir Roderick Glossop to turn it into a sanatorium. Chuffnell Regis parts were filmed in Clovelly, Devon. Also called "The Mysterious Stranger".
11	6	"Wooster with a Wife"	Simon Langton	"Bertie Changes His Mind" (from Carry On, Jeeves) "Jeeves and the Kid Clementina" (from Very Good, Jeeves) "The Ordeal of Young Tuppy" (from Very Good, Jeeves) "Jeeves in the Springtime" (from The Inimitable Jeeves)	19 May 1991	22 January 1995	206
Bertie is interested in parenthood and decides to begin by marrying Bobbie Wickham. Jeeves does not approve; Bobbie is too preoccupied with other things to give Bertie due attention and Bertie must put up with her niece Clementina, who has a ferocious appetite. Tuppy Glossop has broken off with Angela Travers again and is infatuated with dog-lover Daisy Dalgleish. Tuppy is convinced he can impress her in a rugby match but Jeeves interferes. Bingo Little is also in love—with a tea shop waitress. The only potential obstacle to the match would be the severance of his allowance from his Uncle Mortimer, who may not approve. To soften him up, Jeeves recommends that Bingo read to his uncle a series of romance novels (by Rosie M. Banks) with characters whose love transcends class divisions. It works—too effectively. Filming locations include Chenies Manor. Also called "Jeeves the Matchmaker".

=== Series 3 (1992) ===
No. overall	No. in series	Title	Directed by	Adaptation of	Original release date	U.S. air date	Prod. code
12	1	"Bertie Sets Sail"	Ferdinand Fairfax	"Jeeves and the Unbidden Guest" (from Carry On, Jeeves)	29 March 1992	N/A	301
Bertie escapes Aunt Agatha's plot to get him married to Honoria Glossop by taking a ship to New York, accompanied by Jeeves. On board he meets Tuppy who plans on buying and importing a car from J. Washburn Stoker as part of a harebrained money-making scheme. During the voyage, Bertie is also lumbered with Wilmot, the browbeaten son of Aunt Agatha's friend, Lady Malvern. To make matters worse, once in America, Lady Malvern departs for a tour of prisons for her upcoming book, leaving Bertie with strict instructions on how to look after the "very delicate" Wilmot, with the implied threat that should he shirk this responsibility, then 'The Nephew Crusher', Aunt Agatha, will be informed of his whereabouts. However, Wilmot, a reluctant teetotaller, starts to frequent nightclubs and takes up heavy drinking. Meanwhile, Tuppy, in order to impress Stoker's daughter, Pauline, with whom he has fallen madly in love, has promised to buy 48 cars from her father when he barely has enough money for one. Jeeves has to intervene to sort things out at the end. Also called "Safety in New York".
13	2	"The Full House"	Ferdinand Fairfax	"Jeeves and the Hard-boiled Egg" (from Carry On, Jeeves) "The Aunt and the Sluggard" (from Carry On, Jeeves)	5 April 1992	N/A	302
Poet Rockmetteller "Rocky" Todd wants nothing more than a quiet life in his cabin in the Long Island woods. However, Rocky's Aunt Isabel, who provides his allowance, wants him out-about-town every night in order to write her detailed reports on New York nightlife so she can live vicariously through her nephew. Jeeves agrees to go clubbing in his place, and composes daily letters to Aunt Isabel in Rocky's name. However, Jeeves makes it sound so good that Aunt Isabel decides to come and see for herself. Meanwhile, when Francis "Bicky" Bickersteth's miserly father, the Duke of Chiswick, discovers that his son is not studying farming in Colorado as he thought, he threatens to sever his allowance. Bicky then lies about running a successful business in New York. When the Duke unexpectedly arrives in New York he presumes that Bertie's apartment belongs to his son, and believing that Bicky is doing well, cuts off his allowance anyway. The situation is further complicated by Bertie having previously agreed to lend his apartment to Rocky in order to impress Aunt Isabel. It is down to Jeeves to save the day. Also called "Bertie Ensures Bicky Can Continue to Live in Manhattan".
14	3	"Introduction on Broadway"	Ferdinand Fairfax	"The Artistic Career of Corky" (from Carry On, Jeeves) "Jeeves and the Chump Cyril" (from The Inimitable Jeeves)	12 April 1992	12 December 1992	303
Aunt Agatha sends Cyril Bassington-Bassington to Bertie in New York with strict instructions that he is to be kept away from the stage. Shortly after arrival, Cyril goes on stage. Meanwhile, Bruce "Corky" Corcoran asks Bertie to help him ask his uncle to accept his fiancee, Muriel Singer. Things go awry when the uncle ends up marrying Muriel and cuts off Corky's allowance. Aunt Agatha arrives and wants to see a play, the same play that Cyril is in. Only Jeeves can sort out such a mess. Also called "Cyril And The Broadway Musical".
15	4	"Right Ho, Jeeves"	Ferdinand Fairfax	The Mating Season	19 April 1992	3 January 1993	304
Aunt Agatha wants to set Bertie up with Gertrude Winkworth, daughter of Dame Daphne Winkworth of Deverill Hall. Meanwhile, Gussie Fink-Nottle is compelled to visit Deverill by his fiancé Madeline Bassett to meet her godmother, Dame Daphne, but the night before travelling he (apparently) gets sentenced to 14 days in jail for drunk and disorderly behaviour. To avoid trouble from Madeline, Bertie turns up at Deverill Hall pretending to be Gussie, but the latter also arrives later in the day, having actually just been fined rather than given a custodial sentence, with Jeeves posing as his valet. Gussie subsequently pretends to be Bertie and woos Gertrude successfully. Meanwhile, Claude "Catsmeat" Potter-Pirbright, who is in love with Gertrude but has been rejected by Dame Daphne, arrives at Deverill pretending to be Bertie's valet. When it seems that things can't get any worse, Aunt Agatha and Madeline arrive as well. Also called "Bertie Takes Gussie's Place At Deverill Hall".
16	5	"Hot Off the Press"	Ferdinand Fairfax	"Jeeves Takes Charge" (from Carry On, Jeeves); The Mating Season	26 April 1992	10 January 1993	305
Sir Watkyn Bassett is writing a memoir, which includes an uncensored account of the misspent youth of both the author and his peers, some of whom are now well-known public figures with images and reputations to protect. Bertie, who has just become engaged to Sir Watkyn's niece, Lady Florence Craye, is sent to Totleigh Towers to secretly destroy the manuscript. Guests at the house include Sir Roderick Spode, Gussie Fink-Nottle and also Rev. Harold "Stinker" Pinker, who is trying to win back Stiffy Byng, Sir Watkyn's ward. Added issues involving a local play, and a dog that gets arrested, result in Jeeves having to set things straight at Totleigh. Also called "Sir Watkyn Bassett's Memoirs".
17	6	"Comrade Bingo"	Ferdinand Fairfax	"Comrade Bingo" (from The Inimitable Jeeves) "Jeeves Makes an Omelette" (from A Few Quick Ones)	3 May 1992	17 January 1993	306
Bingo Little has joined an outspoken Bolshevik group, Heralds of the Red Dawn, in order to court the daughter of the group's leader, Charlotte Rowbotham, with whom he has fallen in love. Bertie is persuaded by Aunt Dahlia into accompanying her to Marsham Manor (near Goodwood races) to help charm novelist Cornelia Fothergill into selling her latest serial to 'Milady's Boudoir' magazine. However, she doesn't tell Bertie that she also wants him to steal a particularly saucy painting by Edward Fothergill (Cornelia's father-in-law). Meanwhile, the Red Dawn arrive at Goodwood, where a disguised Bingo denounces the "plutocratic" racehorse owners' capitalist oppression of the honest working man. As Roderick Spode (now the seventh Earl of Sidcup) and his Black Shorts also happen to be rallying at Goodwood, pandemonium inevitably ensues. Also called "Aunt Dahlia, Cornelia And Madeline".

=== Series 4 (1993) ===
No. overall	No. in series	Title	Directed by	Adaptation of	Original release date	U.S. air date	Prod. code
18	1	"Return to New York"	Ferdinand Fairfax	"The Spot of Art" (from Very Good, Jeeves) "The Delayed Exit of Claude and Eustace" (from The Inimitable Jeeves) "Fixing it for Freddie" (from Carry On, Jeeves)	16 May 1993	10 October 1993	401
While Bertie and Jeeves are in New York again, Aunt Agatha informs Bertie that she intends to send her wayward nephews Claude and Eustace Wooster to South Africa. However, both of them fall in love with a singer at a nightclub Bertie takes them to, and they sneak back from the docks to pursue her. Bertie wants to marry painter Gwladys Pendlebury but falls foul of a soup manufacturer, to whom Tuppy wants to sell a family recipe as part of his plan to woo the attractive Elizabeth Vickers. Bertie's efforts to help Tuppy end in a disaster and Aunt Agatha ends up as a laughingstock, and looking for the cause, blames Bertie.
19	2	"The Once and Future Ex"	Ferdinand Fairfax	Joy in the Morning	23 May 1993	N/A	402
Bertie bumps into his former fiancée Lady Florence in a bookshop while buying a birthday present for Jeeves. But after a row with her present suitor, the insanely jealous D'Arcy "Stilton" Cheesewright, she renews her engagement to Bertie. Friend George Caffyn needs $50,000 for his play but can only get it from Chichester Clam once he sells his boats to Lord Worplesdon, but the press pack hounding them is stopping the deal from going through. At the same time, Lord Worplesdon's ward Zenobia wants his permission to marry George, and Bertie finds himself drawn into their plan to get it. Jeeves sees a fancy dress party as a way of sorting everything out. Also called "Lady Florence Craye Arrives In New York".
20	3	"Bridegroom Wanted!"	Ferdinand Fairfax	"Jeeves and the Greasy Bird" (from Plum Pie) "Bingo and the Little Woman" (from The Inimitable Jeeves)	30 May 1993	17 October 1993	403
(Bertie plays "Puttin on the Ritz" as introduction). Bingo Little wants to marry a waitress so needs his uncle's blessing. Bertie is pushed into helping him by pretending to be author Rosie M. Banks (not for the first time). His uncle, Lord Bittlesham, is under Sir Roderick Glossop who has moved to America (and after the events of Thank You, Jeeves, is a close friend of Bertie). Trying to sort things out, Bertie manages to make Blair Eggleston break off his engagement with Honoria who now wants to marry Bertie and get a theatrical Agent with a very muscular friend after him. Meanwhile Bingo marries the waitress, who turns out to be the real Rosie M. Banks, so she and Lord Bittlesham are also after Bertie who decides the best thing is to take the next ship to London. But so do all the others and, confronted by all of them on board, he and Jeeves jump ship. Eight and a half months later, they turn up back in England, with long beards and looking like they have spent much of that time in an open boat and in savage lands. Also called "Honoria Glossop Turns Up".
21	4	"The Delayed Arrival"	Ferdinand Fairfax	Jeeves and the Feudal Spirit	6 June 1993	24 October 1993	404
Aunt Dahlia's magazine is in deep money trouble again so she wants to sell it to a Mr Trotter. To make it more saleable, she plans on paying a thousand pounds to a famous novelist for a story, which means she has to pawn her pearl necklace. Meanwhile, Lady Florence Craye has an on-off engagement with the homicidal D'Arcy "Stilton" Cheesewright, with Bertie being the cause of the break-ups. An expert is brought in to value the pearls, which have been replaced with fakes, and there is a race on to sell the magazine and get the real ones back in time. Both Jeeves and Bertie appear in drag in this episode. Also called "Arrested in a Night Club".
22	5	"Trouble at Totleigh Towers"	Ferdinand Fairfax	Stiff Upper Lip, Jeeves	13 June 1993	N/A	405
Bertie goes to Totleigh Towers at Stephanie "Stiffy" Byng's request. She wants him to steal an African statue which she thinks is evil. Gussie Fink-Nottle at Madeline Bassett's request has become a vegetarian, but this is too much for him and he falls for the cook (Emerald) who has been feeding him steak and kidney pie at midnight. Madeline, with Gussie out of the way, falls for Bertie, who steals the statue but has to return it when the owner (Major Plank) will not buy it back. Bertie then blacks up to pretend to be an African wanting to get the statue back for his tribe, just as the real Africans turn up. Jeeves can sort things out though, for a price. Wooster, with other characters, performs Oh By Jingo!. Scenes at Totleigh Towers were filmed at Highclere Castle, also known as the title castle in Downton Abbey. Also called "Totleigh Towers".
23	6	"The Ties That Bind"	Ferdinand Fairfax	Much Obliged, Jeeves	20 June 1993	31 October 1993	406
Bertie is at Totleigh Towers for the marriage of Roderick Spode and Madeline Bassett. Friend Ginger Winship is engaged to Lady Florence Craye so Bertie thinks that he's finally safe as far as marriage is concerned. Parliamentary candidate Ginger falls for his secretary and throws the Parliamentary election, causing Florence to dump him, and Spode decides to stand in his place, throwing in his title and causing Madeline to dump him. Both women now have their eyes firmly set on Bertie. Meanwhile the Butlers' and Valets' book from the Ganymede Club has been stolen, with all the secrets of the gentlemen they worked for in danger of being exposed. There is also a problem with the drains at Totleigh Towers so Bertie calls in Tuppy Glossop, who has bought a new invention which he claims clears drains and treats them to prevent future clogs. When he tries it out, it makes things far worse. Bertie manages to escape both engagements, but gets the blame for ruining the wedding of Madeline and Spode when Tuppy's machine backfires and douses everyone present with filthy water. He and Jeeves flee from the enraged mob as the credits roll. Also called "The Exes Are Nearly Married Off".

== See also ==
- List of Jeeves and Wooster characters
