= Trouble at Totleigh Towers =

- Jeeves and Wooster episode
- Episode no.: Season 4 Episode 5
- Directed by: Ferdinand Fairfax
- Original air date: 13 June 1993

Episode chronology
← Previous "The Delayed Arrival"	Next → "The Ties That Bind"

"Trouble at Totleigh Towers" is the fifth episode of the fourth series of the 1990s British comedy television series Jeeves and Wooster. It is also called "Totleigh Towers". It first aired in the UK on 13 June 1993 on ITV. Some of the external scenes were filmed at Highclere Castle.

In the US, it was one of five episodes of Jeeves and Wooster that were not aired as part of the original broadcast of the television series on Masterpiece Theatre, though all episodes were made available on US home video releases. "The Bassetts' Fancy Dress Ball" aired as the fifth episode of the fourth series of Jeeves and Wooster instead.

In the episode, Wooster appears in blackface and uses racial stereotypes to impersonate a visiting dignitary.

== Background ==
Adapted from Stiff Upper Lip, Jeeves. The filming location for Totleigh Towers, where much of the episode takes place, was Highclere Castle.

== Cast ==
- Bertie Wooster – Hugh Laurie
- Jeeves – Stephen Fry
- Roderick Spode – John Turner
- Sir Watkyn – John Woodnutt
- Madeline Bassett – Elizabeth Morton
- Stiffy Byng – Charlotte Attenborough
- Gussie Fink-Nottle – Richard Braine
- Stinker Pinker – Simon Treves
- Major Plank – Norman Rodway
- Constable Oates – Sidney Livingstone
- Emerald Stoker – Emma Hewitt
- Toto – Colin McFarlane
- Butterfield – Preston Lockwood

== Plot ==
Stiffy tasks Bertie with stealing a statuette that is believed to be cursed. Gussie Fink-Nottle resists his fiancée Madeline Bassett's attempts to make him a vegetarian.

== See also ==
- List of Jeeves and Wooster characters
