= Jeeves Saves the Cow-Creamer =

- Jeeves and Wooster episode
- Episode no.: Season 2 Episode 1
- Directed by: Simon Langton
- Original air date: 14 April 1991

Episode chronology
← Previous "Will Anatole Return to Brinkley Court?"	Next → "The Bassetts' Fancy Dress Ball"

"Jeeves Saves the Cow-Creamer" is the first episode of the second series of the 1990s British comedy television series Jeeves and Wooster. It is also called "The Silver Jug". It first aired in the UK on 14 April 1991 on ITV. Filming took place at Highclere Castle which was the principal location for Totleigh Towers.

In the US, "Jeeves Saves the Cow-Creamer" was aired as the fourth episode of the fourth series of Jeeves and Wooster on 29 January 1995 on Masterpiece Theatre. The episode "Introduction on Broadway" was aired as the first episode of the second series instead.

== Background ==
Adapted from The Code of the Woosters.

== Cast ==
- Jeeves – Stephen Fry
- Bertie Wooster – Hugh Laurie
- Aunt Dahlia – Vivian Pickles
- Roderick Spode – John Turner
- Sir Watkyn Bassett – John Woodnutt
- Stiffy Byng – Charlotte Attenborough
- Madeline Bassett – Diana Blackburn
- Gussie Fink-Nottle – Richard Garnett
- Rev. Stinker Pinker – Simon Treves
- Constable Oates – Campbell Morrison
- Barmy Fotheringay-Phipps – Martin Clunes
- Proprietor – Harry Landis
- Drones Porter – Michael Ripper

== Plot ==
Aunt Dahlia sends Bertie to "sneer" at an antique, silver cow creamer, in order to keep its price down. He accidentally brings the antique to the attention of rival collector Sir Watkyn Bassett, who buys it. Dahlia sends Bertie to get the creamer back at all costs. Jeeves steals the unique silver cow creamer, using it as the car/motor mascot and hiding it as a hood/bonnet ornament and radiator cap on Wooster's car.

Sir Roderick Spode is appalled when he learns that Madeline Bassett is engaged to Gussie Fink-Nottle. Gussie is naturally terrified of Spode, and even the smallest misunderstanding will put his life in jeopardy. Spode has two jobs—he is the leader of the Black Shorts, a tiny political group dressed in black shorts, but also designs and sells women's underwear, being the proprietor of a lingerie shop called Eulalie Soeurs. He is perpetually in fear that his followers in his first role will discover his second one and it is the threat of this disclosure which is used by Jeeves to stop him assaulting Bertie. Jeeves reveals the secret pseudonym "Eulalie" and finds a way of keeping Spode from beating Bertie into a jelly.

== See also ==
- List of Jeeves and Wooster characters
