= Sir Watkyn Bassett's Memoirs =

- Jeeves and Wooster episode
- Episode no.: Season 3 Episode 5
- Directed by: Ferdinand Fairfax
- Original air date: 26 April 1992

Episode chronology
← Previous "Bertie Takes Gussie's Place At Deverill Hall"	Next → "Aunt Dahlia, Cornelia and Madeline"

"Sir Watkyn Bassett's Memoirs" is the fifth episode of the third series of the 1990s British comedy television series Jeeves and Wooster. It is also called "Hot off the Press". It first aired in the UK on 26 April 1992 on ITV.

In the US, it was aired as the third episode of the second series of Jeeves and Wooster on Masterpiece Theatre, on 10 January 1993.

== Background ==
The episode was adapted from "Jeeves Takes Charge" (collected in Carry On, Jeeves) and The Mating Season.

== Cast ==
- Bertie Wooster – Hugh Laurie
- Jeeves – Stephen Fry
- Roderick Spode – John Turner
- Sir Watkyn Bassett – John Woodnutt
- Gussie Fink-Nottle – Richard Braine
- Florence Craye – Fiona Gillies
- Madeline Bassett – Elizabeth Morton
- Stiffy Byng – Amanda Harris
- Stinker – Simon Treves
- Constable Oates – Stewart Harwood
- Receptionist – Lucy Parker
- Butterfield – David Rolfe
- Mrs Blackett – Diana Cummings

== Plot ==
Sir Watkyn Bassett is writing his memoirs of his misspent youth, which also include a lot of other misspent youths of people who are now famous. Bertie, who has just become engaged, is sent to destroy the manuscript. Guests at the house include would-be dictator Roderick Spode, Gussie Fink-Nottle, and another old enemy of Bertie's, Constable Oates. The local vicar is Stinker Pinker. Added to this is a number of tough young ladies, a local play and a dog that gets arrested, all of which means a lively time for Bertie and Jeeves.

== See also ==
- List of Jeeves and Wooster characters
