= The Bassetts' Fancy Dress Ball =

- Jeeves and Wooster episode
- Episode no.: Season 2 Episode 2
- Directed by: Simon Langton
- Original air date: 21 April 1991

Episode chronology
← Previous "Jeeves Saves the Cow-Creamer"	Next → "Pearls Mean Tears"

"The Bassetts' Fancy Dress Ball" is the second episode of the second series of the 1990s British comedy television series Jeeves and Wooster. It is also called "A Plan for Gussie". It first aired in the UK on 21 April 1991 on ITV.

In the US, this episode was originally broadcast as the fifth episode of the fourth series of Jeeves and Wooster on 5 February 1995 on Masterpiece Theatre. The second episode of the second series was instead "Bertie Takes Gussie's Place At Deverill Hall".

== Background ==
Adapted from The Code of the Woosters.

== Cast ==
- Jeeves – Stephen Fry
- Bertie Wooster – Hugh Laurie
- Sir Roderick Spode – John Turner
- Sir Watkyn Bassett – John Woodnutt
- Madeline Bassett – Diana Blackburn
- Stiffy Byng – Charlotte Attenborough
- Gussie Fink-Nottle – Richard Garnett
- Constable Oates – Campbell Morrison
- Rev. Stinker Pinker – Simon Treves
- Barmy Fotheringay-Phipps – Martin Clunes
- Oofy Prosser – Richard Dixon

== Plot ==
Gussie Fink-Nottle has been keeping a notebook containing insulting observations on Sir Watkyn Bassett and Sir Roderick Spode, in order to keep his courage up about them. Gussie is naturally terrified of Spode, and even the smallest misunderstanding will put his life in jeopardy. Spode has two jobs—he is the leader of the Black Shorts, but also designs and sells women's underwear, being the proprietor of a lingerie shop called Eulalie Soeurs. He is perpetually in fear that his followers in his first role will discover his second one and it is the threat of this disclosure which is used by Bertie to stop him assaulting Gussie. Jeeves revealed the secret pseudonym "Eulalie". When Gussie loses the notebook, he calls on Bertie to help find it. Gussie (dressed as a devil) is assaulted by Spode (a Roman soldier). Bertie finds a way of keeping Spode from beating Gussie into a jelly telling Spode: "Spode, I know all about Eulalie."

The Rev. Harold "Stinker" Pinker and Stephanie "Stiffy" Byng wish to marry, but Stiffy's guardian Sir Watkyn doesn't approve. Stiffy blackmails Bertie into helping her convince her guardian otherwise.

Meanwhile Bertie comes into possession of a policeman's helmet.

== See also ==
- List of Jeeves and Wooster characters
