= Prysock =

Prysock is a surname. Notable people with the surname include:

- Arthur Prysock (1924 or 1929–1997), American jazz and R&B singer
- Ephesians Prysock, American football player
- Wilburt Red Prysock (1926–1993), American R&B tenor saxophonist

See also:

- Arthur Prysock (Jeeves character), minor character in the Jeeves and Wooster episode "Introduction on Broadway"
- Arthur Prysock and Count Basie, studio album by Arthur Prysock and Count Basie
