= Pearls Mean Tears =

- Jeeves and Wooster episode
- Episode no.: Season 2 Episode 3
- Directed by: Simon Langton
- Original air date: 28 April 1991

Episode chronology
← Previous "The Bassetts' Fancy Dress Ball"	Next → "Chuffy"

"Pearls Mean Tears" is the third episode of the second series of the 1990s British comedy television series Jeeves and Wooster. It is also called "The Con". It first aired in the UK on 28 April 1991 on ITV.

In the US, the episode was aired as the first episode of the fourth series of Jeeves and Wooster. It aired on 8 January 1995 on Masterpiece Theatre. The episode "Sir Watkyn Bassett's Memoirs" was aired as the third episode of the second series instead.

== Background ==
Adapted from "Aunt Agatha Takes the Count" (collected in The Inimitable Jeeves) and "The Rummy Affair of Old Biffy" (collected in Carry On, Jeeves).

== Cast ==
- Jeeves – Stephen Fry
- Bertie Wooster – Hugh Laurie
- Aunt Agatha – Mary Wimbush
- Sidney Hemmingway – Graham Seed
- Aline Hemmingway – Rebecca Saire
- Charles "Biffy" Biffen – Philip Shelley
- Sir Roderick Glossop – Roger Brierley
- Lady Glossop – Jane Downs
- Honoria Glossop – Elizabeth Kettle
- Barmy Fotheringay-Phipps – Martin Clunes
- Oofy Prosser – Richard Dixon
- Manager – Robert Aldous
- Sergeant – Christopher Whittingham

== Plot ==
Aunt Agatha intends to engage Bertie to "a nice quiet girl" named Aline Hemmingway. Bertie is forced to spend some time with Aline and her brother, Rev. Sidney Hemmingway, but finds them dreary. After Sidney loses money at the races, he borrows £100 from Bertie with Aline's pearl necklace on deposit. Coincidentally, Aunt Agatha's pearl necklace goes missing.

Charles Edward Biffen ("Biffy") cannot find a girl to whom he was engaged, named Mabel. Primarily because he cannot remember her surname. Biffy comes to Jeeves for help, but Jeeves, who happens to be the Mabel's uncle, and misunderstands Biffy's intentions, does not wish to help. Mabel is now a British burlesque dancer and showgirl who performs in the theatre. At the end Jeeves produces a plan to get Biffy and Mabel together and suggests to Biffy that he may go to the theatre. Disaster ensues when Biffy sees Mabel dancing and singing in the theatre. Biffy proposes and she accepts his proposal and Honoria cries hysterically.

== See also ==
- List of Jeeves and Wooster characters
