= Bertie Takes Gussie's Place At Deverill Hall =

- Jeeves and Wooster episode
- Episode no.: Season 3 Episode 4
- Directed by: Ferdinand Fairfax
- Original air date: 19 April 1992

Episode chronology
← Previous "Introduction on Broadway"	Next → "Sir Watkyn Bassett's Memoirs"

"Bertie Takes Gussie's Place At Deverill Hall" is the fourth episode of the third series of the 1990s British comedy television series Jeeves and Wooster. It is also called "Right Ho! Jeeves". It first aired in the UK on 26 April 1992 on ITV.

In the US, it was aired as the second episode of the second series of Jeeves and Wooster on Masterpiece Theatre, on 3 January 1993. "The Ties That Bind" aired as the fourth episode of the third series instead.

== Background ==
Adapted from The Mating Season.

== Cast ==
- Bertie Wooster – Hugh Laurie
- Jeeves – Stephen Fry
- Aunt Agatha – Mary Wimbush
- Gussie Fink-Nottle – Richard Braine
- Madeline Bassett – Elizabeth Morton
- Gertrude – Chloë Annett
- Dame Daphne Winkworth – Rosalind Knight
- Emmeline – Hilary Sesta
- Harriet – Harriet Reynolds
- Myrtle – Celia Gore-Booth
- Charlotte – Sheila Mitchell
- Catsmeat – John Elmes
- Hilda – Harriet Bagnall
- Magistrate – Llewellyn Rees

== Plot ==
Gussie Fink-Nottle is to visit Deverill Hall but gets drunk and ends up sentenced to 14 days in jail. Bertie is also due there, where Aunt Agatha is trying to match him up with Gertrude Winkworth. So that Gussie doesn't get in trouble, Bertie turns up pretending to be him, but then Gussie turns up too (having just been fined) with Jeeves posing as his valet. Gussie pretends to be Bertie and woos Gertrude successfully. Meanwhile, Catsmeat Potter-Pirbright, who is in love with Gertrude, appears (he has been rejected by the fierce Dame Daphne Winkworth and her four sisters), pretending to be Bertie's valet. When it seems that things can't get any worse, Aunt Agatha and Gussie's girlfriend Madeline Bassett turn up.

== See also ==
- List of Jeeves and Wooster characters
