= The Purity of the Turf (Jeeves and Wooster) =

- Jeeves and Wooster episode
- Episode no.: Season 1 Episode 3
- Directed by: Robert Young
- Original air date: 6 May 1990

Episode chronology
← Previous "Tuppy and the Terrier"	Next → "The Hunger Strike"

"The Purity of the Turf" is the third episode of the first series of the 1990s British comedy television series Jeeves and Wooster. It is also called "The Village Sports Day at Twing" or "The Gambling Event". It first aired in the UK on 6 May 1990 on ITV. The episode aired in the US on 25 November 1990 on Masterpiece Theatre.

== Background ==
Adapted from "Indian Summer of an Uncle" (collected in Very Good, Jeeves) and "The Purity of the Turf" (collected in The Inimitable Jeeves).

== Cast ==
- Bertie Wooster – Hugh Laurie
- Jeeves – Stephen Fry
- Aunt Agatha – Mary Wimbush
- Uncle George – Nicholas Selby
- Maud Wilberforce – Paula Jacobs
- Bingo Little – Michael Siberry
- Rupert Steggles – Richard Braine (as Richard Brain)
- Freddie Widgeon – Charles Millham
- Lord Wickhammersley – Jack Watling
- Lady Wickhammersley – Richenda Carey
- Cynthia – Helena Michell
- Vicar – Jack May
- Drones Porter – Michael Ripper

== Plot ==
Bertie's Uncle George wishes to marry a young waitress. Aunt Agatha is dismayed and, through Bertie, offers the girl £100 to break off the engagement; instead, however, Bertie meets Maud Wilberforce, who has a connection with his uncle being the uncle's long-lost barmaid love.

Bertie visits Twing Hall, where Lady Wickhammersley has banned all gambling after Lord Wickhammersley lost the East Wing in a game. Rupert Steggles has surreptitiously arranged to take bets, however, on the events at a village fair. Bertie and Bingo place bets on the competitors, only to find that Steggles has rigged the events. Jeeves duly sorts things out.

== See also ==
- List of Jeeves and Wooster characters
