= The Hunger Strike (Jeeves and Wooster) =

- Jeeves and Wooster episode
- Episode no.: Season 1 Episode 4
- Directed by: Robert Young
- Original air date: 13 May 1990

Episode chronology
← Previous "The Purity of the Turf"	Next → "Will Anatole Return to Brinkley Court?"

"The Hunger Strike" is the fourth episode of the first series of the 1990s British comedy television series Jeeves and Wooster. It is also called "How Does Gussie Woo Madeline?". It first aired in the UK on 13 May 1990 on ITV. The episode aired in the US on 2 December 1990 on Masterpiece Theatre.

== Background ==
Adapted from the book Right Ho, Jeeves, by P. G. Wodehouse and dramatized by Clive Exton.

== Cast ==
- Bertie Wooster – Hugh Laurie
- Jeeves – Stephen Fry
- Aunt Dahlia – Brenda Bruce
- Tom Travers – Ralph Michael
- Angela Travers – Amanda Elwes
- Gussie Fink-Nottle – Richard Garnett
- Tuppy Glossop – Robert Daws
- Madeline Bassett – Francesca Folan
- Anatole – John Barrard
- Barmy Fotheringay-Phipps – Adam Blackwood
- Oofy Prosser – Richard Dixon
- Drones Porter – Michael Ripper

== Plot ==
Aunt Dahlia coerces Bertie into handing out the prizes at Market Snodsbury Grammar School by threatening to withhold the services of her master chef, Anatole, being the supremely skilled French chef of Aunt Dahlia at her country house Brinkley Court. Bertie tries to sort out Tuppy Glossop and Angela Travers's relationship, Gussie and Madeline's relationship, and an issue Aunt Dahlia has with her husband—all without the help of Jeeves. Bertie recommends that they make a hunger strike in order to provoke feelings of guilt in others and to go without dinner, but this backfires when the others remain completely oblivious and an offended Anatole gives notice.

Newt-fancier Gussie Fink-Nottle comes to Jeeves for advice about Madeline Bassett, with whom he is enamoured. Since she is staying at Brinkley Court with Aunt Dahlia, Bertie delegates Gussie to give the prizes.

== See also ==
- List of Jeeves and Wooster characters
