= Will Anatole Return to Brinkley Court? =

- Jeeves and Wooster episode
- Episode no.: Season 1 Episode 5
- Directed by: Robert Young
- Original air date: 20 May 1990

Episode chronology
← Previous "The Hunger Strike"	Next → "Jeeves Saves the Cow-Creamer"

"Will Anatole Return to Brinkley Court?" is the fifth episode of the first series of the 1990s British comedy television series Jeeves and Wooster. It is also called "Brinkley Manor" or "The Matchmaker". It first aired in the UK on 20 May 1990 on ITV. The episode aired in the US on 9 December 1990 on Masterpiece Theatre.

== Background ==
Adapted from Right Ho, Jeeves.

== Cast ==
- Bertie Wooster – Hugh Laurie
- Jeeves – Stephen Fry
- Aunt Dahlia – Brenda Bruce
- Tom Travers – Ralph Michael
- Angela Travers – Amanda Elwes
- Madeline Bassett – Francesca Folan
- Tuppy Glossop – Robert Daws
- Gussie Fink-Nottle – Richard Garnett
- Barmy Fotheringay-Phipps – Adam Blackwood
- Oofy Prosser – Richard Dixon
- Anatole – John Barrard
- Headmaster – Peter Hughes
- Seppings – Neil Hallett

== Plot ==
Anatole was the supremely skilled French chef of Aunt Dahlia at her country house Brinkley Court. He gave notice when Bertie recommended that they make a hunger strike in order to provoke feelings of guilt in others and to go without dinner made by the chef. Jeeves returns to London to persuade Anatole to return to Brinkley Court, whereto Bertie subsequently goes to reconcile Angela Travers with Tuppy Glossop, who is growing increasingly suspicious and jealous of his relationship with her.

In order to bolster Gussie Fink-Nottle's courage to deliver the prizes and propose to Madeline Bassett, both Bertie and Jeeves spike his orange juice. Jeeves finally sorts out all the fractured relationships with a plan to set off the fire alarm.

== See also ==
- List of Jeeves and Wooster characters
