= A Royal Scandal =

A Royal Scandal may refer to:

- A Royal Scandal (1945 film), a film about the Russian Czarina Catherine the Great
- A Royal Scandal (1996 film), a British television docudrama on the ill-fated marriage of George IV and Duchess Caroline of Brunswick

== See also ==
- The Royal Scandal, a 2001 Sherlock Holmes television movie
