= By Jeeves =

Musical

- Jeeves (formerly)
- Cast recording
- Music: Andrew Lloyd Webber
- Lyrics: Alan Ayckbourn
- Book: Alan Ayckbourn
- Basis: Jeeves stories by P. G. Wodehouse
- Productions: 1975 West End; 1996 West End revival 1996 Goodspeed Opera House; 2001 Broadway; 2007 UK tour

By Jeeves, originally Jeeves, is a musical with music by Andrew Lloyd Webber, and lyrics and book by Alan Ayckbourn. It is based on the series of novels and short stories by P. G. Wodehouse that centre around the character of Bertie Wooster and his loyal valet, Jeeves.

Premiering on April 22, 1975, at Her Majesty's Theatre in London, the show flopped initially, running for only a month. After an extensive rewrite, the show was produced in 1996 in both London and America, and premiered on Broadway in 2001.

== 1975: Jeeves ==
=== Background and production ===
Tim Rice conceived the idea of turning P. G. Wodehouse's Jeeves stories into a musical. Originally, he was to work with his then-partner, Andrew Lloyd Webber, but Rice backed out of the project. Eventually Lloyd Webber teamed up with famed British playwright Alan Ayckbourn, and the two of them began work with the personal blessing of Wodehouse. Ayckbourn utilised characters and plot lines from several Jeeves and Wooster stories, notably The Code of the Woosters. The action takes place at the East London Club for Unmanageable Boys, where Bertie Wooster is playing a banjo concert; his banjo keeps breaking down, so he is forced to tell stories to pass the time while Jeeves is sent off to fetch new strings. Bertie recounts how he managed to become engaged to three ladies simultaneously and how his valet Jeeves (through ingenious intervention) unravelled the complications.

Tryout performances were held at the Bristol Hippodrome between 20 March and 5 April 1975. According to the programme, the Bristol show was presented by David Land and Guy Bolton. Unfortunately, the loyalty to the Wodehouse material made for an epic length (four and three-quarter hours at the Bristol tryouts), and reducing the duration made for creative tensions. Rows broke out about the presence of an all-male singing sextet accompanying Bertie Wooster and the realization that the first woman did not appear on stage until thirty-five minutes had passed. Additional problems were caused by Ayckbourn's lack of interest in musical theatre as a genre: he was quoted at one point as saying, "I think musicals are pretty damn boring, but I hope this one is a bit different", and he ended up writing a book that could hypothetically stand on its own without songs.

Lloyd Webber wrote a period score that eschewed all traces of the pop inflections of his work on Joseph and the Amazing Technicolor Dreamcoat and Jesus Christ Superstar. The sound of trumpets, banjos and saxophones for this score were written by a group of arrangers: Keith Amos, Don Walker, Lloyd Webber himself and his future orchestrator, David Cullen.

The show opened in London on 22 April 1975 at Her Majesty's Theatre, starring David Hemmings as Bertie Wooster and Michael Aldridge as Jeeves. The role of Madeleine Bassett was performed by T.V. actress Gabrielle Drake. Other cast members included Debbie Bowen, Gordon Clyde, Angela Easterling, John Turner, Bill Wallis and David Wood. Actress Betty Marsden was cast as Aunt Dahlia, but the role and the accomplished actress were released before opening night.

The director Eric Thompson (father of actress Emma Thompson) was fired just before the opening, so Ayckbourn himself stepped in, aided by choreographer Christopher Bruce. The production received poor reviews and closed after little over a month and 38 performances, on 24 May. Several critics noted that the authors failed to develop the title character, Jeeves not even having a solo song.

The original cast album (MCA Cat. No. MCF 2726) was recorded and released, but it is extremely hard to find. Lloyd Webber, reportedly acting on the advice of American theatre director Harold Prince, withdrew the recording in order to be able to reuse some of the musical material in subsequent shows.

=== Roles and original cast ===
The following is a list of the roles in the 1975 musical, with the original cast.

- Bertie Wooster – David Hemmings
- Jeeves – Michael Aldridge
- Harold "Stinker" Pinker – Gordon Clyde
- Gussie Fink-Nottle – Christopher Good
- Sir Watkyn Bassett – Bill Wallis
- Roderick Spode – John Turner
- Honoria Glossop – Angela Easterling
- Seppings – Graham Hamilton
- Ramsay, the parlourmaid – Elaine Louden
- Dawkins, the kitchenmaid – Jini Steel
- Madeline Bassett – Gabrielle Drake
- Stiffy Byng – Debbie Bowen
- Bingo Little – David Wood
- Aunt Dahlia – Betty Marsden*
- Sharkey, a gardener's boy – Peter Kosta
- Cropper, a gardener's boy – Brett Forrest
- The Drones Club – Derek Beard, Bill Boazman, John Dicks, David Cordwell, Sam Cox, and Terry Wood

The list includes Betty Marsden, who was cast as Aunt Dahlia. The role was included in some of the Bristol performances, and Marsden's name was featured prominently in promotional materials, but the role was cut before the London production.

=== Musical numbers ===
The following songs were performed in the 1975 musical in London. The performers stated for the songs are taken from the Bristol Hippodrome programme.

Act 1

- "Banjo Boy" – Bertie, The Drones
- "The Code Of The Woosters" – Bertie, The Drones
- "Literary Men" – Bertie, Gussie, Jeeves
- "Travel Hopefully" – Bertie, Jeeves, The Drones
- "The Code Of The Woosters" (reprise) – Bertie
- "Female Of The Species" – Stiffy
- "Today" – Bertie, Bingo, Company
- "When Love Arrives" – Bertie, Madeline
- "Today" (reprise) – Stiffy, Madeline, Honoria

Act 2

- "Entr'acte" – The Drones
- "Jeeves Is Past His Peak" – Bertie, The Drones
- "Half A Moment" – Stiffy, Harold
- "S.P.O.D.E." – Spode, Company
- "Summer Day" – Bertie, Company
- "My Sort Of Man" – Honoria
- "Eulalie" – Bertie, Jeeves
- "'Tis 'Nature's Plan" – Company
- "Literary Men" (reprise) – Bertie, Bassett, Honoria, Spode
- "Banjo Boy" (reprise) – Bertie, The Drones

Madeline Bassett's name is written as "Madeleine" in the programme. "My Sort Of Man" was added sometime after the opening at Bristol to replace dialogue between Honoria and Bertie. Fourteen songs were recorded as part of the original cast recording, including an "Overture" (without vocals) and an "Entr'acte" (with vocals). The songs "Food of Love", sung by Aunt Dahlia, and "Song of Spode", sung first by Spode and again in a reprise by Aunt Dahlia, were cut before the London production and not recorded. Another song that was not recorded was "Literary Men" sung by Bertie, Jeeves & Gussie, the melody of which was later reused in Song and Dance – first as the finale "When You Want to Fall in Love" and later as a new song in the first act "Unexpected Song".

In the song "Eulalie", Jeeves advises Bertie to use the word Eulalie to subdue the villainous Spode. Unlike in the novels, the reason that this word affects Spode is not explained in the musical, which ends with the curtain closing as Jeeves is apparently about to explain all. A song similar to "Female Of The Species", sung by Stiffy, was originally planned to be incorporated in the 1996 revival, but was eventually replaced with "Love's Maze".

Some of the songs from the score managed to find a life after the original production: "Half a Moment" was later recorded by Lloyd Webber's second wife, Sarah Brightman, on the album The Songs That Got Away and the track "Summer Day" was re-written and appeared in new chordal disguise as "Another Suitcase in Another Hall" in Evita. A small section of "Half a Moment" was cut from the song and reused in Sunset Boulevard as part of the song "As if We Never Said Goodbye".

The melody of "Female of the Species" appeared earlier than its Jeeves incarnation, with lyrics written and sung by Tim Rice as "The Ballad of Robert and Peter" in 1973 (for private recording purposes). "Travel Hopefully" is a melody originally written as "Love Is Here" for the first ever Lloyd Webber/Rice project, The Likes of Us.

== 1996: By Jeeves ==
=== Background ===
In 1996, Lloyd Webber and Ayckbourn decided to revisit the show, jettisoning most of the score and the entire original book. Retitled By Jeeves (so as to dispel all previous associations with the original production), the character of Roderick Spode and his fascistic intentions were eliminated from the plot. The character list was whittled down from 22 to 10, and the original orchestrations also underwent a reduction to a small band. Only four songs from the original show remained lyrically intact: "Banjo Boy", "Half a Moment", "Travel Hopefully", and "When Love Arrives", as well as the chorus for Code of the Woosters and a melody used in Wooster Will Entertain You. The other songs and musical interludes were mostly new or reworked compositions by Lloyd Webber.

=== Productions ===
By Jeeves re-opened on 1 May 1996 at the Stephen Joseph Theatre-in-the-round in Scarborough, North Yorkshire, an English seaside resort. Audience reaction was generally enthusiastic so the show moved on 2 July 1996 to London for a 12-week season at the fairly intimate Duke of York's Theatre. The show turned out to be more popular than first thought, and the run was extended to February 1997 with the show moved to The Lyric Theatre in Shaftesbury Avenue.

Steven Pacey played Bertie Wooster and Malcolm Sinclair played his valet Jeeves. The Musical Director was Kate Young. The 1996 cast recording has an unusual format, taking a track between every song where Bertie and Jeeves humorously summarise the plot. Pacey was nominated for an Olivier Award for Best Actor in a Musical, and By Jeeves also received nominations for Outstanding New Production and Best Costume Designer. A radio version, performed by the original London cast, was broadcast on 14 December 1996 on BBC Radio 2.

The show had its United States premiere on 12 November 1996, at the Goodspeed Opera House in East Haddam Connecticut. US actor John Scherer took the part of Bertie, and Richard Kline played Jeeves. Edward Keith Baker played Jeeves with Scherer as Bertie Wooster in the 1997 Geffen Playhouse production.

A pre-Broadway staging of the musical was presented at Pittsburgh Public Theater's O'Reilly Theater in February 2001. It ran through 4 March 2001. John Scherer portrayed Bertie Wooster and British actor Martin Jarvis portrayed Jeeves.

By Jeeves had a brief run on Broadway at the Helen Hayes Theater, from 28 October 2001 (in previews October 16) to 30 December 2001, for 73 performances. Directed by Ayckbourn, the cast featured Scherer (Bertie), James Kall (Gussie) and Martin Jarvis (Jeeves) (who received the Theatre World Award).

In the 2011 production of the musical at the Landor Theatre in Clapham, London, Kevin Trainor played Bertie Wooster, with Paul M. Meston as Jeeves.

The musical was produced in 2017 at the Old Laundry Theatre, Bowness-on-Windermere (UK), with Alan Ayckbourn as the director. Nadim Naaman portrayed Bertie Wooster and Bill Champion portrayed Jeeves.

=== Plot synopsis ===
==== Act One ====
A charity banjo concert is to be performed in a church by Bertie Wooster, an amiable gentleman who often finds himself involved in various misadventures from which he is saved by his intelligent valet Jeeves. A friendly vicar, the Rev. Harold "Stinker" Pinker, introduces his friend Bertie to the church audience (the actual audience). Stinker also introduces the volunteers who are helping with the charity concert, and the show's stage manager, Jeeves. Bertie is handed an instrlu and starts playing, but stops when he realises he is holding a frying pan ("A False Start"). Jeeves reports that the banjo was stolen (though it is implied that this was arranged by Jeeves, who does not want Bertie to play the banjo). Jeeves suggests that Bertie recount one of his adventures while they wait for a replacle banjo. The volunteers perform the roles of the other characters in the story.

Jeeves directs the impromptu story to start. In the story, Bertie faces the magistrate Sir Watkyn Bassett in court after taking a constable's helmet as a boyish prank. Bertie uses an assumed name, Gussie Fink-Nottle. (Bertie has doubts about telling an improvised story, but decides to continue so the audience will not be disappointed ("Wooster Will Entertain You"). Jeeves continues to manage the production, and reminds Bertie about the story's events.) The real Gussie Fink-Nottle, one of Bertie's pals, comes to Bertie's flat. Gussie declares that he loves his friend Madeline Bassett, Sir Watkyn Bassett's daughter. Bertie has apologised for using Gussie's name, but now Gussie cannot use his own name with Sir Watkyn, so he has assumed Bertie's name. Madeline helped come up with this plan and invited Gussie to Sir Watkyn's country house, Totleigh Towers. Sir Watkyn and Gussie (calling himself Bertie) go to Totleigh. Bertie is shocked by an announcle in The Times saying that he is engaged to Stephanie "Stiffy" Byng, Sir Watkyn's ward. Bertie is friends with Stiffy but has no intention of marrying her. Following Jeeves's advice, Bertie plans to go to Totleigh using Gussie's name again, to confront Stiffy.

While driving to Totleigh, Bertie remains optimistic and also sees his friend Bingo Little, who loves the formidable Honoria Glossop ("Travel Hopefully"). Honoria also appears. She and Bertie were once engaged, and she still has feelings for Bertie, though Bertie is too polite to tell her he is glad the engagle ended ("That Was Nearly Us"). Bingo overhears this and is annoyed with Bertie. Bertie introduces himself, accidentally using his real name, to forthright American businessman Cyrus Budge III Jr., a guest at Totleigh who wants to court Madeline. Stiffy loves Stinker Pinker (played by himself), but they need Sir Watkyn's approval to marry. Stiffy had an engagle announced between her and Bertie so Bertie would have to come. She wants Bertie to help her and Stinker ("Love's Maze"). To make Bertie stay and help, she points out that Gussie will be in trouble when Sir Watkyn reads the engagle announcle in The Times. Since Cyrus knows Bertie's name, Bertie makes sure Gussie uses his own name when greeting Cyrus, and they all reintroduce themselves ("The Hallo Song"). Cyrus realises he is Gussie's rival for Madeline's affections and intimidates Gussie. Madeline inadvertently reveals to her father that Bertie is not Gussie, so Bertie pretends he is Bingo Little instead. Honoria and Bingo arrive at the house, and Bertie introduces Bingo as Gussie Fink-Nottle. Sir Watkyn and Cyrus are left confused about who is who.

==== Act Two ====
At the start of the second act, Sir Watkyn is confused about the identities of his guests, Bertie is concerned about Stiffy's scheming, and Bingo and Gussie want to be united with Honoria and Madeline respectively. Bertie, Bingo, and Gussie are not sure what to do next and ask for help from the brainy Jeeves ("By Jeeves"). Jeeves tells them he has not yet thought of a way to help. Gussie is afraid of Cyrus, who threatens to fight Gussie, and is too shy anyway to confess his feelings to Madeline. Jeeves suggests that Bertie tell Madeline that Gussie loves her. Bertie tries to do so by telling Madeline that someone loves her, but she misunderstands and thinks Bertie is confessing his love for her ("When Love Arrives"). Gussie and Cyrus are now upset with Bertie. Bertie is annoyed that Jeeves's advice has not kept him out of trouble, though Jeeves says he has tried his best to help ("What Have You Got To Say, Jeeves?"). Bertie tells Jeeves not to help any more (except as stage manager).

Stiffy comes up with a plan for Bertie to pretend to be a burglar, so that Stinker can impress Sir Watkyn by stopping him. Stiffy and Stinker sing about their love for each other ("Half A Moment"). Bertie, somewhat moved by their song, reluctantly agrees to help them by taking part in Stiffy's scheme. Bertie wears a pig mask (since no better mask was available among the props on hand) and uses a ladder to break into Totleigh Towers. He ends up climbing into the wrong room, and is chased by multiple characters through the house, since they think he is really a masked burglar ("It's A Pig!"). Before Stinker can make an appearance of apprehending Bertie, Cyrus tries to catch Bertie, and Stinker accidentally hits Cyrus, who is briefly knocked out. While chasing Bertie through Totleigh Towers, Gussie reunites with Madeline by coming to help her, and Bingo bonds with Honoria. Just as Bertie is about to be unmasked by Sir Watkyn, Bertie apologises to Jeeves for doubting him and asks for his help. Jeeves switches Cyrus and Bertie's places. Bertie is saved and Cyrus is caught as the thief. Since Stinker apparently helped catch the thief, he gets Sir Watkyn's approval. Bertie, Bingo, and Gussie try to reintroduce themselves to Sir Watkyn, though he is still confused. Stinker escorts Cyrus away, and the happy couples depart. Jeeves has also prevented further trouble by acquiring Sir Watkyn's copy of The Times before Sir Watkyn could see the engagle announcle.

The Totleigh Towers story ends. A new banjo arrives for Bertie to play, though it has been muted (apparently on purpose, since Jeeves does not want Bertie to play the banjo). Jeeves convinces Bertie that the banjo is still audible to the audience, so Bertie believes he can finally play the banjo for the audience as intended. He sings a song while playing the muted banjo, and the other actors perform as a supporting chorus while wearing costumes from The Wizard of Oz which they had on hand ("Banjo Boy"). Lastly, the group performs a reprise of multiple songs ("Wizard Rainbow Banjo Mix").

=== Roles and original cast ===
Character	London (1996)	Goodspeed Opera House (1996)	Geffen Playhouse (1997)	Pittsburgh Public Theater (2001)	Film (2001)	Broadway (2001)
Bertie Wooster	Steven Pacey	John Scherer	John Scherer	John Scherer	John Scherer	John Scherer
Jeeves	Malcolm Sinclair	Richard Kline	Edward Keith Baker	Martin Jarvis	Martin Jarvis	Martin Jarvis
Honoria Glossop	Lucy Tregear	Donna Lynne Champlin	Donna Lynne Champlin	Donna Lynne Champlin	Donna Lynne Champlin	Donna Lynne Champlin
Gussie Fink-Nottle	Simon Paisley Day	Kevin Ligon	Kevin Ligon	James Kall	James Kall	James Kall
Harold "Stinker" Pinker	Richard Long	Ian Knauer	Ian Knauer	Ian Knauer	Ian Knauer	Ian Knauer
Stiffy Byng	Cathy Sara	Emily Loesser	Emily Loesser	Emily Loesser	Emily Loesser	Emily Loesser
Sir Watkyn Bassett	Robert Austin	Merwin Goldsmith	Merwin Goldsmith	Heath Lamberts	Heath Lamberts	Sam Tsoutsouvas
Bingo Little	Nicholas Haverson	Randy Redd	Randy Redd	Don Stephenson	Don Stephenson	Don Stephenson
Madeline Bassett	Diana Morrison	Nancy Anderson	Nancy Anderson	Becky Watson	Becky Watson	Becky Watson
Cyrus Budge III (Junior)	Nicolas Collicos	Jonathan Stewart	Jonathan Stewart	Steve Wilson	Steve Wilson	Steve Wilson

=== Musical numbers ===
There are thirteen songs. In the 1996 American premiere, the second song "The Code Of The Woosters" was replaced with "Wooster Will Entertain You", and the first performance of "Banjo Boy" (which Bertie does not finish) was retitled "A False Start". These changes were kept for the 1996 BBC radio production of the musical with the original London cast. The second version of the original London cast recording, released in March 1997, has "Wooster Will Entertain You" in place of "The Code Of The Woosters", which had been included in the first version released in July 1996.

Act 1

- "A False Start" – Bertie
- "Wooster Will Entertain You" – Bertie
- "Travel Hopefully" – Bertie, Jeeves, Bingo
- "That Was Nearly Us" – Honoria, Bertie
- "Love's Maze" – Stiffy, Bertie, Company
- "The Hallo Song" – Bertie, Budge, Gussie

Act 2

- "By Jeeves" – Bertie, Bingo, Gussie
- "When Love Arrives" – Bertie, Madeline
- "What Have You Got To Say, Jeeves?" – Bertie, Jeeves
- "Half A Moment" – Harold, Stiffy
- "It's A Pig!" – Honoria, Madeline, Bertie, Bassett, Gussie
- "Banjo Boy" – Bertie, Company
- "Wizard Rainbow Banjo Mix" – Company

The thirteenth song "Wizard Rainbow Banjo Mix" is a reprise of multiple songs in the musical. "The Hallo Song" is a reworked tune, released in 1972 as "What a Line to Go Out On" sung by Yvonne Elliman. The tune of "It's a Pig!" appeared with different lyrics as "Magdalena", an unsuccesls pop song for Tony Christie in 1977.

In the Broadway 2001 production, the song "Wooster Will Entertain You" appears to have been replaced with a song titled "Never Fear" according to the Broadway show's programme, (the tune of which comes from the song "You Won't Care About Him Anymore" heard in another Lloyd Webber project that was only staged in limited form at his Sydmonton Festival called "The Likes of Us").

== Awards and nominations ==
=== 1996 London revival ===
Year	Award	Category	Nominee	Result
1997	Laurence Olivier Award	Best Musical Revival		Nominated
1997	Laurence Olivier Award	Best Actor in a Musical	Steven Pacey	Nominated
1997	Laurence Olivier Award	Best Costume Design	Louise Belson	Nominated

== Filmed production ==
A film recording of the musical By Jeeves, featuring Martin Jarvis as Jeeves and John Scherer as Bertie Wooster, was released in October 2001. It was filmed in a studio in Toronto after the Pittsburgh production. It aired on Canadian television in March 2001 and was recorded for British and Canadian video release. The film was co-produced by the Canadian Broadcasting Company, Really Useful Films, and Tapestry Pictures. The directors were Alan Ayckbourn and Nick Morris.

The cast later reprised their roles for the 2001 Broadway production, except the role of Sir Watkyn Bassett would be played by Sam Tsoutsouvas on Broadway. F. Wade Russo was the musical director for the film and was also the pianist, who is referred to by characters on stage as Oswald "Ozzie" Nutledge. The choreographer was Sheila Carter and the editor was Nick Morris.

Film cast

- Bertie Wooster – John Scherer
- Jeeves – Martin Jarvis
- Honoria Glossop – Donna Lynne Champlin
- Bingo Little – Don Stephenson
- Gussie Fink-Nottle – James Kall
- Sir Watkyn Bassett – Heath Lamberts
- Madeline Bassett – Becky Watson
- Stiffy Byng – Emily Loesser
- Harold "Stinker" Pinker – Ian Knauer
- Cyrus Budge III Junior – Steve Wilson

== Bibliography ==
- Coveney, Michael. The Andrew Lloyd Webber Story (2000), Publisher: Arrow Books. ISBN 978-0-09-925719-6
- Jarvis, Martin. Broadway Jeeves?, (2003), Publisher: Methuen Drama, ISBN 0-413-77331-0
- McKnight, Gerald. Andrew Lloyd Webber: A Biography (1985), St. Martins Press, ISBN 0-312-03647-7
- Taves, Brian (2006). P. G. Wodehouse and Hollywood: Screenwriting, Satires and Adaptations. McFarland & Company. ISBN 978-0786422883.
- Walsh, Michael. Andrew Lloyd Webber: his life and works: a critical biography (1997), Harry N. Abrahms, Inc., ISBN 978-0-8109-1275-5
