= Richard Braine =

Richard Braine may refer to:

- Richard Braine (politician) (born 1968), British politician, briefly leader of the UK Independence Party (UKIP)
- Richard Braine (actor) (born 1956), British actor, playwright and theatre director
