= Amanda Elwes =

English actress

- Born: Amanda Dorothy Cary Elwes; 25 July 1964 (age 62); Seale, Surrey, England
- Education: Central School of Speech and Drama
- Occupations: Actress, floristry business owner
- Years active: 1980s–2004
- Spouse: Matthew Austin (m. 1992)

Amanda Elwes (born 25 July 1964) is a retired English actress, and, through Amanda Austin Flowers, a small business owner in Chelsea, in a floristry business serving the United Kingdom and continental Europe.

== Early life and education ==
Amanda Dorothy Cary Elwes (and twin sister Lydia) were born on 25 July 1964 in Seale, Surrey, to Timothy Cyprian George Thomas Elwes, of East End Farm of Seale, and his first wife Lorna. Lorna was in turn daughter of Ian Archibald de Hoghton Lyle—once a Captain of the Scottish military unit, The Black Watch—and his wife, also named Lydia. This British military officer, killed in action in World War II (October 1942), was of the family of the Lyle baronets of Glendelvine, of county Perth.

Actor Cary Elwes and his brother, producer Cassian Elwes, are first cousins.

Elwes trained at the Central School of Speech and Drama.

== Career ==
Amanda Elwes first acted on stage in the early 1980's. Among her theatre roles are as Mary Crawford in Mansfield Park (at the Sheffield Crucible), Lucy in Woman in Mind (1992, at the Theatre Royal, Windsor), Lady Windermere in Lady Windermere's Fan (1993-1994, at Theatre Royal, Bath, and in 1994 with the Birmingham Repertory Company and others at Albery Theatre, London, the Birmingham Repertory Theatre, and other locations), and Emma in Betrayal (Harold Pinter's play) (1995, at the Citizens Theatre in Glasgow).

She made her first screen appearance in a commercial for After Eight mints in 1987 along with former theatre colleague Adam Morris. Two years later, in January 1989, she made her television debut in an episode of the TV detective series, Bergerac. She gained notice for a number of successful new shows that year, including episodes in Agatha Christie's Poirot, and Campion. In the following year she appeared in a popular hit series, playing Angela Travers in two episodes of Jeeves and Wooster. Another notable role was her portrayal of Marjorie Fisher in A Perfect Hero (1991) alongside Nigel Havers. She continued into 1992 with appearances in A Touch of Frost, Miss Marple, and a role in the television movie Tattle Tale (alongside Americans C. Thomas Howell and Ally Sheedy).

Elwes continued appeared on screen in The Riff Raff Element (1993), and Heartbeat (1994). After this her workload dropped off considerably.

During her run on stage in Lady Windermere's Fan in the West End, Elwes, five months pregnant with her first child and "looking for a more child-friendly career", learned of a fellow actress' love of flowers and "ask[ed] whether she could come and learn". She eventually founded Amanda Austin Flowers (in 1998), in Chelsea. In 2011, her twin sister Lydia joined her in running the business.

She continued to act sporadically on screen, including in the children's drama True Tilda in 1997, and the ITV series Rosemary & Thyme in 2004. As of this date, she had retired from acting.

== Personal life ==
Elwes married music producer Matthew Austin in 1992.

=== Television ===
| Year | Title | Role | Notes, Ref. |
|---|---|---|---|
| 1989 | Bergerac | Jane | Episode: Sea Changes |
| 1989 | Agatha Christie's Poirot | Mildred Hope | Episode: The Third Floor Flat |
| 1989 | Campion | Janet Pursuivant | Episode: The Case of the Late Pig |
| 1989 | Shadow of the Noose | Lady Mabel | Episode: Noblesse Oblige |
| 1989 | Storyboard | Caroline | Episode: A Question of Commitment |
| 1990 | The Saint: The Software Murders | Antoinette | TV Movie |
| 1990 | TECX | Freida | Episode: Rock a Buy Baby |
| 1990 | Jeeves and Wooster | Angela Travers | 2 Episodes: The Hunger Strike, and Will Anatole Return to Brinkley Court? |
| 1991 | A Perfect Hero | Marjorie Fisher | 5 Episodes |
| 1991 | The House of Eliott | Rose Gillespie | Series 1, Episode 10 |
| 1992 | Lovejoy | Fiona | Episode: Angel Trousers |
| 1992 | Tattle Tale | Mimi | TV Movie |
| 1992 | A Touch of Frost | Alex Compton | Episode: Not With Kindness |
| 1992 | Miss Marple | Margot Bence | Episode: The Mirror Crack'd from Side to Side |
| 1993 | The Riff Raff Element | Francesca | 2 Episodes: Series 1, ep 5 & 6 |
| 1994 | Heartbeat | Marjorie Salter | Episode: Witch Hunt |
| 1996 | A Royal Scandal | Lady Charlotte Douglas | TV Movie |
| 1997 | True Tilda | Sally Breward | 4 Episodes |
| 1998 | The Cater Street Hangman | Mrs Abernathy | TV Movie |
| 2000 | Fish | Lynn Holdsworth | Episode: Unchartered Waters |
| 2004 | Rosemary & Thyme | Eleanor Marshall | Episode: The Invisible Worm |
