= Campbell Morrison =

Scottish actor

- Born: William Morrison; 21 June 1952; Glasgow, Scotland
- Died: 10 January 2008 (aged 55); Warminster, England
- Occupation: Actor
- Years active: 1975–2006
- Known for: Eldorado, EastEnders
- Spouse: Nicki Ballantyne
- Children: 3, including Luke

Campbell Morrison (born William Morrison; 21 June 1952 – 10 January 2008) was a Scottish actor.

He played one of the main characters, Drew Lockhead in the soap opera Eldorado and also appeared in EastEnders playing DCI Charlie Mason. Morrison was a member of the Royal Shakespeare Company in the early eighties.

Other roles included Police Constable Eustace Oates in Jeeves & Wooster and Gordon Gallagher in the Sky One series Dream Team.

He had two sons, Tom and Luke, from a previous marriage, and a daughter, Lily, with his wife, Nicki Ballantyne.

== Filmography ==
=== Film ===
Film
Year	Title	Role	Notes
1975	The Boat		Short
1987	Hidden City	Man at Rubbish Tip	
1991	The Pope Must Die	Big Security Guard	
1991	Close My Eyes	Scotsman	
1995	The Innocent Sleep	Mac	
1998	Middleton's Changeling	Lollio	
2002	Mad Dogs	Dr. Mackenzie	

=== Television ===
Television
Year	Title	Role	Notes
1979	Play for Today	At the Shipyard	Episode: "Just a Boys' Game"
1982–83	Educating Marmalade	Bonzo Brown	Episodes: "Short Sharp Shock" & " Marmalade at the Albert Hall"
1983	Crown Court	Hugo Maitland	Episode: "Mother's Boy: Part 1"
1983	Gunfight at the Joe Kaye Corral	Gratt Clanton	TV movie
1985	Bulman	Jerry	Episode: "The Daughter Was a Dancer"
1987	Bread	1st Dealer	Episode #3.2
1987	The Bill	Mr Weir	Episode: "Overnight Stay"
1988	Game, Set and Match	Journalist	Episode: "Berlin Game: Part 1 & 2"
1988	God's Frontiersmen	Blacksmith	TV mini-series documentary
1988–89	Life Without George	Sammy	Main cast
1989	Square Deal	Sgt. Frank Ellis	Episode #2.6
1989	Boon	Brian, Black Knight	Episode: "All in a Day's Pork"
1990	This is David Harper	Jimmy Taylor	Episode: "Making History"
1990	The Bill	Wagon Driver	Episode: "Decisions"
1990	Taggart	Willie Jamieson	Episode: "Hostile Witness"
1991	Spatz	Boris Kitchenko	Episode: "From Russia with Love"
1991	Jeeves and Wooster	Oates	Episodes: "The Silver Jug (or Jeeves Saves the Cow Creamer)" & "The Bassetts' Fancy Dress Ball (or A Plan for Gussie)"
1991	Specials	Sgt. McAllister	Main cast
1992	Screen Two	Policeman in Cell	Episode: "The Grass Arena"
1992	Moon and Son	Murphy	Episode: "Past, Present and Future"
1992–93	Eldorado	Drew Lockhead	Main cast
1994	The Bill	Larry Wilson	Episode: "One Born Every Minute"
1995	99-1	Brock	Episode: "Shooting Party"
1995	Casualty	DC Pete Sherwin	Episode: "Turning Point"
1996	Rab C. Nesbitt	Donga	Episode: "Pie"
1996	The Bill	George Jonson	Episode: "Cuckoo"
1996	Bad Boys	Scud	Episode: "No Pain, No Gain"
1995–97	Hamish Macbeth	Harry Balfour	
1997	Ain't Misbehavin'	Sergeant Fullerton / Flight Sergeant Fullerton	Episode 1.2 & 1.3
1998	A Respectable Trade	Jack Kedge	Episode 1.2
1999	Home Farm Twins	Danny Jones	Episode: "Welcome to Home Farm"
1999	The Scarlet Pimpernel	Thouret	Episode: "The Scarlet Pimpernel"
1999	Psychos	Bob Logan	Episode 1.3
1999	Badger	Don King	Episode: "The World According to Carp"
1996–99	EastEnders	DCI Charlie Mason	19 episodes
1999	Taggart	Ricky Strachan	Episode: "Fearful Lightning"
1999–2000	Dream Team	Gordon Gallagher	24 episodes
2000	Coronation Street	Neville Rose	Episode 1.4802 & 1.4804
2000	Casualty	Eddie Harris	Episode: "Coming Clean"
2001	Starhunter	Arielo	Episode: "The Most Wanted Man"
2002	The Bill	DCC Gordon Cooper	4 episodes
2003	Overnite Express	Wullie	Episode 1.2
2003	Two Thousand Acres of Sky	H Armstrong	Episode 3.1
2004	Taggart	Martin Turner	Episode: "Saints and Sinners"
2005	Holby City	Brian Shearlaw	Episode: "Actions Speak Louder"
2005	Doctors	Gerry McCann	Episode: "Watch the Birdie"
2005	William and Mary	Dave	Episode 3.4
2006	New Tricks	D.C.I. Ian Sinclair	Episode: "Wicca Work"
2006	Pickles: The Dog Who Won the World Cup	McTavish	TV movie
2006	A Touch of Frost	Colin Edwards	Episode: "Endangered Species"
