= Sam Tsoutsouvas =

American actor

- Education: Juilliard School (BFA)
- Occupation(s): Lyricist, actor
- Years active: 1973-present

Sam Tsoutsouvas is an American veteran actor and lyricist with experience in the stage, television and films. He appeared in 1967 and 1968 at The Utah Shakespearean Festival in Cedar City, Utah, before attending the Juilliard Drama School in Lincoln Center, New York City. In the 1968 season he played Bassanio in The Merchant of Venice, and Mercutio in Romeo and Juliet.

== Broadway plays ==
- Scapin (1973), Lyrics
- Three Sisters (1973–1974), as Solyony
- The Beggar's Opera (1973–1974), as Lockit
- Measure for Measure (1973–1974), as Lucio
- Three Sisters (1975), as Solyony/Andrei Prozorov
- The Time of Your Life (1975), as Willie/Blick
- Edward II (1975), as Young Mortimer
- By Jeeves (2001), as Sir Watkyn Bassett
- Our Country's Good (1991), as Captain David Collins/Robert Sideway

== Regional Theatre ==
- Work Song: Three Views of Frank Lloyd Wright (2004–2005), as Frank Lloyd Wright--City Theatre
- A Number (2008), as Salter--Pittsburgh Public Theater
- Antony and Cleopatra (2011), as Antony--Pittsburgh Irish and Classical Theatre

== Selected filmography ==
- Ghost (1990), as Minister
- V13 (2025), as Professor Panofski

== TV appearances ==
- Soldier of Fortune, Inc. (1998)
- Law & Order: Criminal Intent - The Posthumous Collection" (2004), as Gerhardt Heltman

== Video games ==
- Grand Theft Auto: San Andreas (2004), as James Pedeaston
