= The Code of the Woosters =

1938 novel by P. G. Wodehouse

- First UK edition
- Author: P. G. Wodehouse
- Language: English
- Series: Jeeves
- Genre: Comic novel
- Publisher: Herbert Jenkins (UK); Doubleday, Doran (US)
- Publication date: 7 October 1938
- Publication place: United Kingdom
- Media type: Print
- Pages: 224
- OCLC: 59362846
- Preceded by: Right Ho, Jeeves
- Followed by: Joy in the Morning

The Code of the Woosters is a novel by P. G. Wodehouse, first published on 7 October 1938, in the United Kingdom by Herbert Jenkins, London, and in the United States by Doubleday, Doran, New York. It was previously serialised in The Saturday Evening Post (US) from 16 July to 3 September 1938, illustrated by Wallace Morgan, and in the London Daily Mail from 14 September to 6 October 1938.

The Code of the Woosters is the third full-length novel to feature Bertie Wooster and his valet Jeeves. It introduces Sir Watkyn Bassett, the owner of a country house called Totleigh Towers where the story takes place, and his intimidating friend Roderick Spode. It is also a sequel to Right Ho, Jeeves, continuing the story of Bertie's newt-fancying friend Gussie Fink-Nottle and Gussie's sentimental fiancée, Madeline Bassett.

Bertie and Jeeves return to Totleigh Towers in a later novel, Stiff Upper Lip, Jeeves.

== Plot ==
Jeeves is trying to persuade Bertie to go on a world cruise. Instead Bertie's Aunt Dahlia sends him to visit a particular antique shop and sneer at a silver eighteenth-century cow creamer, so as to drive down its price for his aunt's collector husband, Tom. In the shop, Bertie encounters the magistrate Sir Watkyn Bassett, who is also a collector. Sir Watkyn is accompanied by his future nephew-in-law Roderick Spode, the leader of a Fascist organization.

Later, Bertie learns that, by playing an underhanded trick on Tom, Sir Watkyn has obtained the creamer. Aunt Dahlia sends Bertie to Totleigh Towers to steal it back, but there he comes under suspicion as someone Sir Watkyn had once sentenced for a drunken offence. Bertie's other reason for visiting is to heal a rift between Gussie Fink-Nottle and Madeline, Sir Watkyn's daughter. Madeline incorrectly believes Bertie is in love with her, and she has promised to marry him if her engagement should ever fail. In order to avoid this at all costs, Bertie persuades Madeline to invite him down, but he learns upon arriving that Gussie and Madeline have reconciled.

To give himself confidence for an upcoming speaking engagement, Gussie has been keeping a notebook in which he writes insults about Sir Watkyn and Spode. When the notebook is lost, Bertie fears that if it should fall into Sir Watkyn's hands, Madeline would be forbidden to marry Gussie. The notebook is found instead by 'Stiffy' Byng, Sir Watkyn's niece, who wants approval from her uncle to marry the local curate, Harold Pinker. Sir Watkyn considers Harold unsuitable, however, so Stiffy uses the notebook to blackmail Bertie into going along with her plan. Bertie must pretend to steal the cow-creamer but allow Harold to catch him in the act. She hopes this will motivate Sir Watkyn to approve Harold's marriage to her.

When Gussie tries to search Stiffy for the missing notebook, Madeline misinterprets his actions and breaks off their engagement. Spode, who has strong protective feelings for Madeline, then threatens Gussie with violence. But Jeeves now learns from his London club that Spode has a shameful secret. Though the club's rules forbid Jeeves revealing it, he informs Bertie that mentioning the name "Eulalie" can control Spode. Bertie now rebukes Spode with sarcastic insults and orders him to leave Gussie alone, with the result that Spode backs down and apologises for his behaviour.

Harold is persuaded to steal the helmet of the local policeman, Constable Oates, to impress Stiffy. Jeeves suggests a new plan: Bertie will tell Sir Watkyn he is engaged to Stiffy. Sir Watkyn will then be so relieved to learn she wants to marry the curate instead that he will allow it. The plan works and Stiffy gratefully tells Bertie that she hid the notebook inside the cow-creamer.

Disgusted by Gussie's apparent infidelity, Madeline tells Bertie that she will marry him. Bertie retrieves the notebook and gives it to Gussie to show Madeline as the explanation of his conduct with Stiffy. But having got into an argument with Sir Watkyn, Gussie gives Sir Watkyn the notebook of insults to supplement his own. Bertie now realises that Sir Watkyn will never relent and the only way to compel him seems to be to steal the cow-creamer and hold it as ransom for Sir Watkyn's approval of Gussie as a husband for Madeline.

Instead Aunt Dahlia steals the cow-creamer and brings it to Bertie for safe keeping. Jeeves suggests that Gussie drives with it to London to escape the angered Sir Watkyn. But Bertie next discovers Oates's helmet, which Stiffy has hidden in his room. He agrees to take the blame, however, after Stiffy appeals to his personal Code of the Woosters, "Never let a pal down".

Unable to prove that Bertie stole the cow-creamer, Sir Watkyn vows to have him imprisoned for the theft of the helmet. Instead Jeeves blackmails Spode with the name Eulalie to announce to Sir Watkyn that he had stolen the helmet himself. Jeeves then points out that Bertie can sue Sir Watkyn for defamation. Trapped, Sir Watkyn concedes approval for Madeline's and Stiffy's marriages.

In gratitude, Bertie agrees to go on the world cruise after Jeeves reveals that Spode is a designer of ladies' underclothing and runs a shop called Eulalie Soeurs, knowledge of which would destroy Spode's authority with his Fascist followers.

== Background ==
The novel was originally to be titled The Silver Cow. When Erd Brandt, an editor at the Saturday Evening Post, criticised the original draft for having too many stage waits, Wodehouse agreed and removed them.

Various themes from the contemporary world feature in The Code of the Woosters, intruding into the otherwise timeless idyll of its country-house setting. In a 1932 letter to his friend William Townend, Wodehouse discussed two of his acquaintances, H. G. Wells and Wells's partner Odette Keun. Wodehouse wrote that "when you go to his residence, the first thing you see is an enormous fireplace, and round it are carved in huge letters the words: TWO LOVERS BUILT THIS HOUSE. Her idea, I imagine. I can't believe Wells would have thought of that himself". This anecdote was later to be incorporated into the novel: Bertie recalls in chapter 3 that he "once stayed at the residence of a newly married pal of mine, and his bride had had carved in large letters over the fireplace in the drawing-room, where it was impossible to miss it, the legend 'Two Lovers Built This Nest', and I can still recall the look of dumb anguish in the other half of the sketch's eyes every time he came in and saw it".

Political satire also became a major plot element in the novel. The character Roderick Spode introduced into it is a parody of the contemporary British fascist politician Sir Oswald Mosley, leader of the British Union of Fascists (called the "Blackshirts"). Wodehouse's strategy is to ridicule Spode's own movement and its would-be dictator in various ways, beginning with their uniform. Rather than black shirts, they are forced to wear black shorts, "footer bags" as Bertie describes them, for which Gussie's explanation is that "there were no shirts left". By the time the novel was published, there had already been uniformed fascist organisations such as the Italian Blackshirts, Hitler's Brownshirts, the French Blueshirts, the Irish Greenshirts and the Silver Legion of America. As an additional satirical stroke, Spode, the leader of the Saviours of Britain movement, is portrayed as a social outsider with messy eating habits who has to resort to bullying as a social tactic in order to assert himself.

== Style ==
In The Code of the Woosters, Wodehouse uses a variety of stylistic devices to create humour. For example, he uses vivid imagery to make exaggerated comparisons for comic effect: "Have you ever heard Sir Watkyn Bassett dealing with a bowl of soup? It's not unlike the Scottish express going through a tunnel" (chapter 4).

Wodehouse occasionally uses a "neglected positive" (a word most used in its negative form), as with gruntled in chapter 1: "I could see that, if not actually disgruntled, he was far from being gruntled". The expression "part brass rags" is comically rendered in passive voice in chapter 6: "Brass rags had been parted by the young couple".

Wodehouse sometimes uses transliteration of ethnic or class-based mispronunciations; The Code of the Woosters features a rural policeman saying "bersicle" for "bicycle" and "verlent" for "violent" (chapter 4).

Though malapropisms are rare in Bertie's speech, one occurs in chapter 5 when Bertie uses "incredulous" for "incredible"; Bertie also makes the same mistake in chapter five of Stiff Upper Lip, Jeeves. Bertie often employs humorous abbreviations, such as exclamash for "exclamation" in chapter 4, and posish for "position" and compash for "compassion" in chapter 5. Some words that have been repeated or are part of cliché phrases are abbreviated to a single letter. For instance, Bertie sometimes refers to Aunt Dahlia as "aged relative", and abbreviates this when speaking to her in chapter 5: "'Let me explain, aged r.'".

As in many of the Jeeves novels, Bertie takes time in the beginning of The Code of the Woosters to ponder how much he should summarize previous events. In chapter 1, after Gussie Fink-Nottle is first mentioned, Bertie states:

A thing I never know, when I'm starting out to tell a story about a chap I've told a story about before, is how much explanation to bung in at the outset. It's a problem you've got to look at from every angle. I mean to say, in the present case, if I take it for granted that my public knows all about Gussie Fink-Nottle and just breeze ahead, those publicans who weren't hanging on my lips the first time are apt to be fogged. Whereas, if before kicking off I give about eight volumes of the man's life and history, other bimbos, who were so hanging, will stifle yawns and murmur "Old stuff. Get on with it."

Bertie then says that he will "put the salient facts as briefly as possible", and further discusses his intention to recount the facts concisely. Part of the humour of this passage is that, despite his concerns about brevity, Bertie's lead-in is nearly as long as the following expositional passage itself.

Beginning with The Code of the Woosters, in which he is suspected of stealing the cow-creamer and a policeman's helmet, Bertie is accused of a theft in every novel in which he appears, which often constitutes a major plot line. The motif of having Bertie suspected of theft creates humour because of its incongruity with Bertie's naive honesty.

== Reception ==
At the time of its publication, Frank Swinnerton welcomed the novel's “happy invention and still happier expression” in The Observer, while The Times commented that, though "the ardent devotee… is always fearful that Mr. Wodehouse will one day come short of himself, The Code of the Woosters may reassure him once more". In a similar vein, the Los Angeles Times welcomed "one more of those amazing novels that Wodehouse turns out with perennial freshness, ringing a change on language and plot but never getting away from the essential Wodehousian manner". In 1988, Wodehouse biographer Richard Usborne agreed, "A Wodehouse plot more complicated than any yet, clockwork with a hundred moving parts, interdependence absolute and a patter of verbal felicities, five or six to a page."

Charlotte Jones, in a 2013 article in The Guardian, testifies to the novel’s enduring appeal in the same terms: “What makes Wodehouse wonderful, though, isn't the preposterous lunacy of the plots, or even the easy nostalgia of the setting; it is his prose. At the core of all of his stories is the surprise of language at its most flexible, fresh and fun". Further evidence is provided by the fact that The Code of the Woosters has been featured in multiple lists, including The Guardian's 2009 list "1000 novels everyone must read" (along with Thank You, Jeeves and Joy in the Morning), The Telegraph's "The 15 best comedy books of all time" (2014), BBC Culture's "The 100 greatest British novels" (2015), Esquire's "The 30 Funniest Books Ever Written" (2018), and Penguin Books's "100 must-read classic books" (2018).

== Adaptations ==
=== Radio ===
The Code of the Woosters was adapted into a radio drama in 1973 as part of the series What Ho! Jeeves starring Michael Hordern as Jeeves and Richard Briers as Bertie Wooster.

L.A. Theatre Works dramatised The Code of the Woosters in 1997, with Martin Jarvis as Jeeves (and Roderick Spode) and Mark Richard as Bertie Wooster.

On 9 April 2006, BBC Radio 4 broadcast The Code of the Woosters as its Classic Serial. Andrew Sachs appeared as Jeeves and Marcus Brigstocke as Bertie Wooster.

=== Television ===
Much of the plot was adapted to form the first two episodes of the second series of the ITV series Jeeves and Wooster, "Jeeves Saves the Cow-Creamer" and "The Bassetts' Fancy Dress Ball", which first aired on 14 April and 21 April 1991.
