= Introduction on Broadway =

- Jeeves and Wooster episode
- Episode no.: Season 3 Episode 3
- Directed by: Ferdinand Fairfax
- Original air date: 12 April 1992

Episode chronology
← Previous "The Full House"	Next → "Bertie Takes Gussie's Place At Deverill Hall"

"Introduction on Broadway" is the third episode of the third series of the 1990s British comedy television series Jeeves and Wooster. It is also called "Cyril And The Broadway Musical". It first aired in the UK on 12 April 1992 on ITV.

In the US, the episode was originally aired as the first episode of the second series of Jeeves and Wooster on Masterpiece Theatre, on 27 December 1992. "The Delayed Arrival" was later aired as the third episode of the third series instead.

== Background ==
Adapted from "The Artistic Career of Corky" (collected in Carry On, Jeeves), and "Jeeves and the Chump Cyril" (collected in The Inimitable Jeeves).

== Cast ==
- Jeeves – Stephen Fry
- Bertie Wooster – Hugh Laurie
- Aunt Agatha – Mary Wimbush
- Cyril Bassington-Bassington – Nicholas Hewetson
- Bruce "Corky" Corcoran – Greg Charles
- Muriel Singer – Dena Davis
- George Caffyn – David Crean
- Alexander Worple – Bill Bailey
- Mr. Blumenfield – Billy J. Mitchell
- Sydney Blumenfield – Anatol Yusef
- Arthur Prysock – John Cassady
- Liftman Coneybear – Ricco Ross
- Corrigan – Sam Douglas

== Plot ==
Aunt Agatha sends Cyril Bassington-Bassington to Bertie in New York with strict instructions that he is to be kept away from the stage. Shortly after arrival, George Caffyn, New York playwright and friend of Bertie Wooster, engages Cyril and he goes on stage. Then Aunt Agatha arrives and wants to see a play, the same play that Cyril is in. Cyril beats the son of Mr. Blumenfield, an American theatrical manager, New York theater owner and important Broadway producer, who gives Cyril notice. Mr. Blumenfield follows always the view of his son on what the people will like in the theater.

Meanwhile, Bruce Corcoran ("Corky"), a New York portrait painter turned cartoonist, asks Bertie to help him ask his wealthy uncle Alexander Worple to accept his girlfriend Muriel Singer so he can marry her. In order to get Worple's blessings and to attract the affection of Corky's uncle, Jeeves produces a plan which involves Muriel writing a book, which pleases Worple. At the end Jeeves writes A Children's Book of American Birds in Muriel's place. Things go wrong and the uncle ends Corky's dream of marrying her. Alexander Worple marries Muriel Singer and Corky has only to paint a portrait of their baby, named "The Baby". But Worple dislikes Corky's Abstract Expressionist portrait painting of the baby and cuts off Corky's allowance. Aunt Agatha comes with NY Chronicle Art Critic Arthur Prysock, an art critic with whom she wants to start and run her own art gallery. She is enamored of the Abstract Expressionist portrait painting by Bruce Corcoran ("Corky"), and asks NY Chronicle Art Critic Arthur Prysock to buy it for her art gallery.

== See also ==
- List of Jeeves and Wooster characters
