= A Royal Scandal (1996 film) =

1996 British television docudrama

Videotape cover

A Royal Scandal is a 1996 British television docudrama produced and directed by Sheree Folkson. The teleplay by Stanley Price focuses on the ill-fated marriage of George IV and Duchess Caroline of Brunswick. Dialogue from actual historical records reveals how each party tries to humiliate the other, causing the monarchy to suffer great embarrassment. Narrated by Ian Richardson, the drama was broadcast by the BBC.

The programme was released on videotape in 1998 and is included in its entirety as a bonus feature on the DVD of The Queen's Sister, released by BBC Video in 2007.

== Background ==
The film was made as a comparison between the Prince of Wales (later George IV)'s marriage and the current prince of Wales and his marriage to princess Diana. The film uses quotes from her Nov 1995 interview with Martin Bashir, 'three of us in this marriage', 'Queen of hearts'.

== Plot ==
Saddled with debt, the Prince of Wales is promised financial support from his father, the reigning King George, only if he marries his coarse and vulgar cousin, Caroline of Brunswick, despite her many faults. The marriage is a disaster from the very start; her efforts to achieve a semblance of grace and majesty fail miserably, and George has no qualms about flaunting his ongoing relationship with Frances Villiers, Countess of Jersey in front of his wife. The two formally separate after the birth of their daughter Charlotte, and George reunites with Maria Fitzherbert, whom he had wed years before meeting Caroline. The union was considered invalid because it had not been approved by the king and the Privy Council.

Caroline is banished to a private residence in Blackheath and her contact with her daughter is restricted. She acts as foster mother to several children, and it is rumoured that one of them is her biological son. An investigation fails to prove the allegation, but Caroline is accused of improper conduct. She leaves the country to travel abroad, and reports of her scandalous behaviour reach her husband on a regular basis. While she's away, nineteen-year-old Charlotte dies after giving birth to a stillborn son.

George IV's accession to the throne brings Caroline back to Britain, and she is embraced by the public, much to her husband's distress. He orders his Prime Minister to destroy her reputation. Efforts to strip Caroline of the title of queen consort and dissolve her marriage by accusing her of committing adultery with commoner Bartolomeo Pergami fail, despite a long parade of witnesses. She arrives at Westminster Abbey to attend her husband's coronation on the arm of her loyal supporter, Lord Hood, but is turned away at the door.

That night Caroline falls ill with what is diagnosed as an intestinal obstruction and, certain death is imminent, requests she be buried in Brunswick. When she dies shortly after, her final wish is honoured by her friends. A plaque reading "Caroline of Brunswick, the injured Queen of England" is affixed to her casket.

== Principal cast ==
- Richard E. Grant as George IV
- Susan Lynch as Caroline of Brunswick
- Michael Kitchen as Lord Malmesbury
- Denis Lawson as Henry Brougham
- Frances Barber as Frances Villiers
- Irene Richard as Maria Fitzherbert
- Oliver Ford Davies as Lord Liverpool
- Stephen Boxer as Lord Hood
- Amanda Elwes as Lady Charlotte Douglas
- Ian Richardson as Narrator
- John Bardon as William Cole
- Rosalind Knight as Lady Charlotte
- Cheryl Fergison as Cleaning Maid
