= Billy J. Mitchell =

American actor

- Born: June 16, 1942
- Died: March 9, 1999 (aged 56); Hertfordshire, England
- Occupation: Actor
- Years active: 1976–1999

Billy J. Mitchell (June 16, 1942 – 9 March 1999) was an American character actor based in the United Kingdom. He was known for portraying North American characters in British-based productions like Superman (1978), Top Secret! (1984), and GoldenEye (1995).

Mitchell died from cancer on 10 March 1999 at the age of 56 in England. He never married and had no children.

== Filmography ==
=== Cinema ===
- Carry On England (1976) – Gunner Childs
- Superman (1978) – 1st Editor (Daily Planet)
- Ragtime (1981) – Delmas' Assistant No. 2
- Star Wars: Episode VI – Return of the Jedi (1983) – Keir Santage (Red Seven) (uncredited)
- The Lonely Lady (1983) – Gross
- Never Say Never Again (1983) – Commander Peterson
- Top Secret! (1984) – Martin
- Morons from Outer Space (1985) – Alaska Space Monitoring Unit Commander (uncredited)
- Rustler's Rhapsody (1985) – Town Doctor
- Death Wish 3 (1985) – Fraker's Lawyer
- Haunted Honeymoon (1986) – Cop No. 1
- Bird (1988) – Prince
- Who Framed Roger Rabbit (1988) – Forensic No. 2
- Indiana Jones and the Last Crusade (1989) – Dr. Mulbray
- Bullseye! (1990) – Elmer, Tourist
- Malcolm X (1992) – Man No. 1
- GoldenEye (1995) – Admiral Chuck Farrell
- What Rats Won't Do (1998) – Diner on Boat
- A Year and a Day (2005) – Band Leader (final film role)
