= List of Jeeves and Wooster characters =

This is a list of Jeeves and Wooster characters from the TV series, based on the Jeeves books by P. G. Wodehouse.

== Main characters ==
Jeeves and Bertie Wooster are in all the episodes.

	Series 1	Series 2	Series 3	Series 4
Aunt Agatha	1, 2, 3	3	3, 4	1, 6
Sir Watkyn Bassett	1	1, 2	5	5, 6
Madeline Bassett	4, 5	1, 2	4, 5, 6	5, 6
Stiffy Byng		1, 2	5	5
Stilton Cheesewright				2, 4
Lady Florence Craye			5	2, 4, 6
Aunt Dahlia	2, 3, 4, 5	1, 6	6	4
Gussie Fink-Nottle	4, 5	1, 2	4, 5	5
Honoria Glossop	1	3		3
Sir Roderick Glossop	1	3, 5		3
Lady Glossop	1	3, 5		
Tuppy Glossop	2, 4, 5	6	1	1, 6
Bingo Little	1, 3	6	6	3
Roderick Spode		1, 2	5, 6	5, 6

== Actors ==
Actors' names are given with the series in which they appeared.

- Bertie Wooster — Hugh Laurie
- Jeeves — Stephen Fry

=== Recurring characters ===
	Series			
Character	Series 1	Series 2	Series 3	Series 4
Bertie Wooster	Hugh Laurie			
Jeeves	Stephen Fry			
Aunt Agatha	Mary Wimbush			Elizabeth Spriggs
Sir Watkyn Bassett	John Woodnutt			
Madeline Bassett	Francesca Folan	Diana Blackburn	Elizabeth Morton	
Aunt Dahlia	Brenda Bruce	Vivian Pickles	Patricia Lawrence	Jean Heywood
Gussie Fink-Nottle	Richard Garnett		Richard Braine	
Tuppy Glossop	Robert Daws			
Bingo Little	Michael Siberry		Pip Torrens	
Honoria Glossop	Elizabeth Kettle			Elizabeth Kettle
Sir Roderick Glossop	Roger Brierley			Philip Locke
Lady Glossop	Jane Downs			
Stinker Pinker		Simon Treves		
Roderick Spode		John Turner		
Stiffy Byng		Charlotte Attenborough	Amanda Harris	Charlotte Attenborough
Florence Craye			Fiona Gillies	Francesca Folan
Stilton Cheesewright				Nicholas Palliser

== Minor characters ==
Character — Actor (Series)

- Anatole — John Barrard (2)
- Rosie M. Banks — Anastasia Hille (4)
- Cyril Bassington-Bassington — Nicholas Hewetson (3)
- Cora Bellinger — Constance Novis (1)
- Francis Bickersteth ("Bicky") — Julian Firth (3)
- Edgar Gascoyne Bickersteth, father of "Bicky" — John Savident (3)
- Charles Edward Biffen ("Biffy") — Philip Shelley (2)
- Mabel, fiancée of "Biffy" — Jenny Whiffen (2)
- Rev. Beefy Bingham — Owen Brenman (1)
- Mortimer Little, Lord Bittlesham — Geoffrey Toone (2,3,4)
- Mr. Blumenfield — Billy J. Mitchell (1,3)
- Sydney Blumenfield — Anatol Yusef (1,3)
- Daphne Braithwaite — Justine Glenton (1)
- Brinkley — Fred Evans (2,4)
- George Caffyn — David Crean (3); Nigel Whitmey (4)
- Freddie Chalk-Marshall — John Duval (1)
- "Chuffy" Chuffnell — Matthew Solon (2)
- Seabury Chuffnell — Edward Holmes (2)
- Myrtle Chuffnell — Fidelis Morgan (2)
- Chichester Clam — John Cater (4)
- Professor Vladimir Cluj — Michael Poole (1)
- Aneta Cluj — Zulema Dene (1)
- Bruce Corcoran ("Corky") — Greg Charles (3)
- Edwin Craye — Kristopher Milnes (4)
- Blair Eggleston — Otto Jarman (4)
- Boko Fittleworth — Richard Stirling (1)
- Freddie Flowerdew — John Boulter (3)
- Cyril "Barmy" Fotheringay-Phipps — Adam Blackwood (1); Martin Clunes (2)
- Oswald Glossop — Alistair Haley (1)
- Aline Hemmingway — Rebecca Saire (2)
- Sidney Hemmingway — Graham Seed (2)
- Zenobia "Nobby" Hopwood — Jennifer Gibson (4)
- Porkie Jupp — Paul Kynman (4)
- Constable Eustace Oates — Campbell Morrison (2), Stewart Harwood (3), Sydney Livingstone (4)
- Gwladys Pendlebury — Deirdre Strath (4)
- Lucius Pim — Marcus D'Amico (4)
- Catsmeat Potter-Pirbright — John Elmes (3)
- Lady Malvern — Moyra Fraser (3)
- Wilmot Pershore ("Motty") — Ronan Vibert (3)
- Oofy Prosser — Richard Dixon (1,2,4)
- Arthur Prysock — John Cassady (3)
- Lord Rainsby — Jason Calder (1)
- Todd Rockmeteller ("Rocky") — John Fitzgerald-Jay (3)
- Isabel Rockmetteller, aunt of "Rocky" — Heather Canning (3)
- Enoch Simpson — David Blake Kelly (1)
- Muriel Singer (later Mrs. Alexander Worple) — Dena Davis (3)
- Slingsby — Harry Ditson (4)
- Myrtle Snap — Veronica Clifford (4)
- Rupert Steggles — Richard Braine (1)
- Dwight Stoker — James Holland (actor) (2)
- Pauline Stoker — Sharon Holm (2); Kim Huffman (3)
- Emerald Stoker — Emma Hewitt (4)
- J. Washburn Stoker — Manning Redwood (2); Don Fellows (3)
- Buffy Toto — Colin McFarlane (4)
- Angela Travers — Amanda Elwes (1)
- Tom Travers — Ralph Michael (1,4)
- Jas Waterbury — David Healy (4)
- Trixie Waterbury — Serretta Wilson (4)
- Roberta Wickham ("Bobbie") — Nina Botting (1); Niamh Cusack (2)
- Lady Wickham — Rosemary Martin (1)
- Sir Cuthbert Wickham — Brian Haines (1)
- Lord Wickhammersley — Jack Watling (1)
- Lady Wickhammersley — Richenda Carey (1)
- Freddie Widgeon — Charles Millham (1); John Duval (2)
- Maud Wilberforce — Paula Jacobs (1)
- Dame Daphne Winkworth — Rosalind Knight (3)
- Gertrude Winkworth — Chloë Annett (3)
- Ginger Winship — Jullian Gartside (4)
- Uncle George Wooster, Lord Yaxley — Nicholas Selby (1)
- Claude Wooster — Hugo E. Blick (1); Jeremy Brook (4)
- Eustace Wooster — Ian Jeffs (1); Joss Brook (4)
- Alexander Worple — Bill Bailey (3)
- Percy Craye, Lord Worplesdon — Frederick Treves (4)

== See also ==
- List of Jeeves and Wooster episodes
- List of Jeeves characters
- The Jeeves books
