= John Turner (actor) =

British television actor

- Born: 7 July 1932 (age 94); London, England
- Occupation: actor
- Years active: 1957–2000
- Spouse: Barbara Jefford (m. 1967; died 2020)

John Turner (born 7 July 1932) is a British television, film and stage actor.

== Career ==
One of Turner's most recognisable roles was that of Roderick Spode (6 episodes, 1991–1993) in the ITV television series Jeeves and Wooster, based on the P. G. Wodehouse novels. He had performed the same role earlier in his career at Her Majesty's Theatre, London in Andrew Lloyd Webber's musical flop Jeeves. He succeeded Joss Ackland as Juan Perón in the musical Evita and later played Molokov in the original London production of Tim Rice’s Chess, both at the Prince Edward Theatre. He portrayed Charlemagne in the original West End cast of Pippin at His Majesty's Theatre and appeared in the original London cast of Budgie the Musical, at the Cambridge Theatre, opposite Adam Faith and Anita Dobson.

Turner made his television debut in 1957, playing a hillbilly in Operation Fracture.

In 1963 he appeared in 5/13 episodes of The Sentimental Agent as Bill Randall and in four episodes replaced the lead character played by Carlos Thompson.

In a career that lasted more than 40 years, he also appeared in 36 episodes of Knight Errant Limited as Adam Knight (1959–1960), as well as in episodes of Z-Cars (1967), The Saint (1968), The Champions (1968), Fall of Eagles (1974), the TV mini series Lorna Doone (1976), Heartbeat (1992), The Adventures of Young Indiana Jones (1999) and The Bill (2000).

Film roles include John in Behemoth the Sea Monster (1959), Lieutenant Pattinson in Petticoat Pirates (1961), Sir Richard Fordyke in The Black Torment (1964), Joab in Captain Nemo and the Underwater City (1969), The Major-domo in The Slipper and the Rose (1976), the Afrikaner Minister in The Power of One (1992), Rasputin: Dark Servant of Destiny (1996) and Lord Lot in Merlin (1998).

== Selected filmography ==
- Nowhere to Go (1958)
- The Giant Behemoth (1959)
- Petticoat Pirates (1961)
- The Black Torment (1964)
- Captain Nemo and the Underwater City (1969)
- The Slipper and the Rose (1976)
- The Power of One (1992)
- Rasputin: Dark Servant of Destiny (1996)
- Merlin (1998)
