= Roderick Spode =

Fictional character in P. G. Wodehouse stories

- Jeeves character
- Roderick Spode, as played by John Turner in the television series Jeeves and Wooster
- First appearance: The Code of the Woosters (1938)
- Last appearance: Much Obliged, Jeeves (1971)
- Created by: P. G. Wodehouse
- Portrayed by: James Villiers; John Turner; Jack Klaff; Others

In-universe information
- Gender: Male
- Title: 7th Earl of Sidcup
- Occupation: Fascist politician and designer of ladies' lingerie, later Earl of Sidcup
- Relatives: Mrs. Wintergreen (aunt); Colonel H. H. Wintergreen (uncle) (deceased); 6th Earl of Sidcup (uncle) (deceased)
- Nationality: British

Roderick Spode, 7th Earl of Sidcup, often known as Spode or Lord Sidcup, is a recurring fictional character in the Jeeves novels of English comic writer P. G. Wodehouse. In the first novel in which he appears, he is an "amateur dictator" and the leader of a fictional fascist group in London called the Saviours of Britain, also known as the Black Shorts. He leaves the group after he inherits his title.

He has a low opinion of Jeeves's employer Bertie Wooster, whom he believes to be a thief. A large and intimidating figure, Spode is protective of Madeline Bassett to an extreme degree and is a threat to anyone who appears to have wronged her, particularly Gussie Fink-Nottle.

== Life and character ==
Spode is a friend of Sir Watkyn Bassett, being the nephew of Sir Watkyn's fiancée Mrs. Wintergreen in The Code of the Woosters, though she is not mentioned again. He is intensively protective of Sir Watkyn's daughter, Madeline Bassett, having loved her for many years without telling her. A violent man, he threatens to tear Bertie's head off and make him eat it. Spode is a large and intimidating figure, with a powerful, square face. When he first sees Spode, Bertie describes him:

About seven feet in height, and swathed in a plaid ulster which made him look about six feet across, he caught the eye and arrested it. It was as if Nature had intended to make a gorilla, and had changed its mind at the last moment.

In Bertie's eyes, Spode starts at seven feet tall, and seems to grow in height, eventually becoming nine feet seven. Bertie immediately thinks of Spode as "the Dictator" even before he learns of Spode's political ambitions. As Bertie says, "I don't know if you have even seen those pictures in the papers of Dictators with tilted chins and blazing eyes, inflaming the populace with fiery words on the occasion of the opening of a new skittle alley, but that was what he reminded me of." Bertie learns how accurate his initial impression of Spode was when Gussie tells him that Spode is the leader of a fascist group called the Saviours of Britain, also known as the Black Shorts. Gussie says of Spode, "His general idea, if he doesn't get knocked on the head with a bottle in one of the frequent brawls in which he and his followers indulge, is to make himself a Dictator."

Like Bertie, Spode had been educated at Oxford; during his time there, he once stole a policeman's helmet. While the leader of the Black Shorts, he is also secretly a designer of ladies' underclothing, being the proprietor of Eulalie Soeurs of Bond Street. Bertie's Aunt Dahlia is a customer at Eulalie Soeurs and remarks that the shop is very popular and successful. Spode later inherits a title on the death of his uncle, becoming the seventh Earl of Sidcup. After being elevated to the peerage, he sells Eulalie Soeurs. At some point, he leaves the Black Shorts. Bertie says in Stiff Upper Lip, Jeeves that before Spode succeeded to his title, he had been "one of those Dictators who were fairly common at one time in the metropolis", but "he gave it up when he became Lord Sidcup". Despite Spode becoming Lord Sidcup, Bertie usually thinks of him as Spode, at one point addressing him as "Lord Spodecup".

In The Code of the Woosters, most of which takes place at Sir Watkyn's country house, Totleigh Towers, Spode is the leader of the Black Shorts. He quickly starts to think of Bertie as a thief, believing that Bertie was trying to steal Sir Watkyn's umbrella and also the silver cow-creamer from a shop. Spode threatens to beat Bertie to a jelly if he steals the cow-creamer from Sir Watkyn. Spode also antagonizes Gussie, for two reasons. First, Spode thinks Gussie is not devoted enough to Madeline, who is engaged to Gussie. Second, Gussie has insulted Spode in a notebook, writing that Spode's mustache was "like the faint discoloured smear left by a squashed blackbeetle on the side of a kitchen sink", and that the way Spode eats asparagus "alters one's whole conception of Man as Nature's last word." With help from Jeeves and the Junior Ganymede Club book, Bertie learns the word "Eulalie", and tells Spode that he knows all about it. Spode, who does not want his followers to learn about his career as a designer of ladies' lingerie, is forced not to bother Bertie or Gussie. Spode is also blackmailed into taking the blame for the theft of Constable Oates's helmet. Bertie does not learn the true meaning of "Eulalie" until the end of the story.

In Jeeves and the Feudal Spirit, which takes place at Aunt Dahlia's country house, Brinkley Court, Spode has recently become Lord Sidcup. Bertie and his Aunt Dahlia plan to blackmail Spode with knowledge of "Eulalie" to keep Spode, who is a jewellery expert, from revealing that Aunt Dahlia's pearl necklace is a fake (she pawned the real one to raise money for her magazine, Milady's Boudoir). However, the blackmail plan is unsuccessful, because, as Spode tells Aunt Dahlia, he has sold Eulalie Soeurs. Aunt Dahlia ends up using a cosh she found on the ground to knock out Spode, which allows her to retrieve her fake necklace from a safe in order to hide it so it cannot be appraised. Later in the story, Spode identifies a different pearl necklace, one belonging to the Liverpudlian socialite Mrs. Trotter, as fake.

In Stiff Upper Lip, Jeeves, which takes place at Totleigh Towers, Spode is as protective of Madeline as ever and threatens to break Bertie's neck when he thinks that he has caused Madeline to cry (she was shedding a tear because she thought Bertie was lovesick and could not stay away from her). Spode, seeing Gussie kiss Emerald Stoker, threatens to break Gussie's neck as well and calls him a libertine. Harold Pinker steps forward to protect Gussie, and after Spode hits Pinker on the nose, Pinker, an expert boxer, knocks him out. Spode soon wakes up, but is knocked out again, by Emerald. Gussie leaves Madeline for Emerald, and Spode proposes to Madeline. She says that she must marry Bertie to reward his love for her, but Spode and Jeeves convince her that Bertie came to Totleigh to steal Sir Watkyn Bassett's black amber statuette, not out of love for her. Madeline accepts Spode's proposal.

In Much Obliged, Jeeves, which takes place at Brinkley Court, Spode has been invited by Bertie's Aunt Dahlia to Brinkley for his skills as an orator. He gives speeches in support of the Conservative candidate for Market Snodsbury, Harold "Ginger" Winship. As Spode's fiancée, Madeline goes with him. After the success of his speeches, Spode considers standing for election himself for the House of Commons, which would require him to relinquish his title. Madeline, who wanted to gain the title Lady Sidcup, breaks their engagement, and says she will marry Bertie instead. After being hit by a potato at a lively candidate debate, Spode changes his mind about standing for Parliament and decides to retain his title, leading to a reconciliation between him and Madeline. They are still engaged at the end of the novel.

Although Spode regularly threatens to harm others, he is generally the one who gets injured. In The Code of the Woosters, when Spode advances to attack Gussie, Gussie manages to hit him on the head with an oil painting. Spode's head goes through the painting, and while he is briefly stunned, Bertie envelops him in a sheet. Bertie then hits Spode with a vase, but gets grabbed by Spode; Bertie frees himself by burning Spode with a cigarette. In other novels, Spode is knocked out three times: he is hit with a cosh by Bertie's Aunt Dahlia in Jeeves and the Feudal Spirit, he is punched by Harold Pinker in Stiff Upper Lip, Jeeves, and Emerald Stoker smashes a china basin on his head in the same book. He is also hit in the eye with a potato at a candidate debate in Much Obliged, Jeeves.

== Appearances ==
Spode is featured in:

- The Code of the Woosters (1938)
- Jeeves and the Feudal Spirit (1954)
- Stiff Upper Lip, Jeeves (1963)
- Much Obliged, Jeeves (1971)

Spode is mentioned in:

- Aunts Aren't Gentlemen (1974) (ch. 7 and 15)

The character is used by Kim Newman in his 'Wodehouse with vampires' short story 'Vampire Romance'.

== The Black Shorts ==
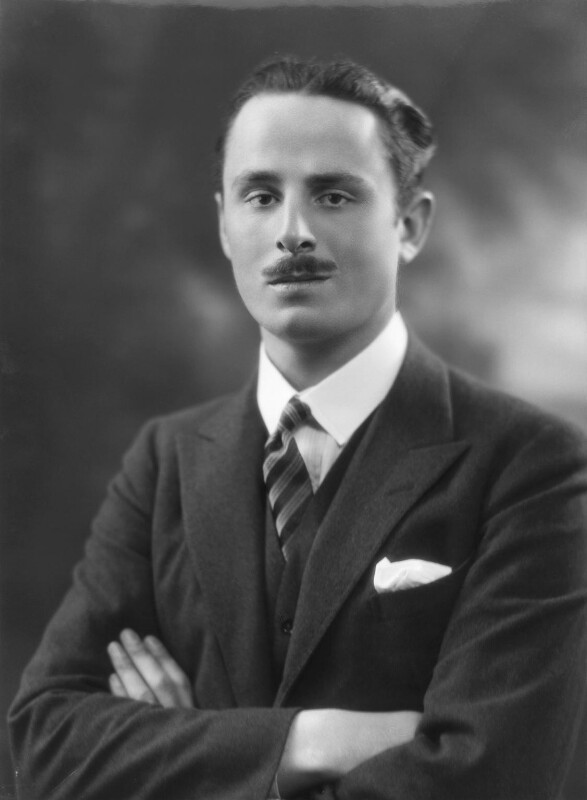
The fascist politician Oswald Mosley, on whom the character of Spode was based

The Saviours of Britain, nicknamed the Black Shorts, is a fictional fascist group led by Roderick Spode. Spode is modelled after Sir Oswald Mosley, leader of the British Union of Fascists (1932–1940), who were nicknamed the Blackshirts. In The Code of the Woosters, Spode is an "amateur dictator" who leads a farcical group of fascists called the Saviours of Britain, better known as the Black Shorts. Spode adopted black shorts as a political uniform because, as Gussie Fink-Nottle says, "by the time Spode formed his association, there were no shirts left". This alludes to various radical groups: Mussolini's Blackshirts, Hitler's Brownshirts, the French Blueshirts and Greenshirts, the Irish Blueshirts and Greenshirts, the South African Greyshirts, Mexico's Gold shirts, and the American Silver Shirts.

When Bertie Wooster rebukes Spode in The Code of the Woosters (1938), he mocks Spode's black shorts, calling them "footer bags" (football shorts):

"It is about time", I proceeded, "that some public-spirited person came along and told you where you got off. The trouble with you, Spode, is that just because you have succeeded in inducing a handful of half-wits to disfigure the London scene by going about in black shorts, you think you're someone. You hear them shouting 'Heil, Spode!' and you imagine it is the Voice of the People. That is where you make your bloomer. What the Voice of the People is saying is: 'Look at that frightful ass Spode swanking about in footer bags! Did you ever in your puff see such a perfect perisher?'"

Like Mosley, Spode inherited a title upon the death of a relative; unlike Mosley, who inherited his baronetcy in 1928 (which entitled him to be called Sir) before forming his fascist group, Spode did not inherit his earldom (which made him Lord Sidcup) until after forming his group. Spode leaves the Black Shorts after gaining his title.

In the television series Endeavour (series five episode four – "Colours"), there is a reference to "Spode and Webley" being shot as fascists. (Webley is another fictional fascist leader, from Aldous Huxley's Point Counter Point, and unlike Spode does end up being assassinated.)

== Adaptations ==
=== Television ===
The flag of the Black Shorts in the Jeeves and Wooster television series.

In the 1990–1993 television series Jeeves and Wooster, Spode was portrayed by John Turner. In this series, Spode, as the leader of the Black Shorts, is depicted as having an appearance somewhat similar to Mussolini. The Black Shorts are portrayed as a tiny group of around a dozen men and teenage boys dressed in uniforms like those of the Sturmabteilung. Their flag is similar in design to the flag of the British Union of Fascists (which used the party's symbol, the Flash and Circle) and has the same flag colour scheme as the National Socialists.

Members of the Black Shorts comprise the small audience to whom Spode makes loud, dramatic Hitler-like speeches in which he announces bizarre statements of policy, such as giving each citizen at birth a British-made bicycle and umbrella. He also makes several statements revolving around root vegetables. In the original stories, none of Spode's speeches are depicted and no other members of his group make an appearance. In both the television series and Wodehouse novels, Spode has a secret recorded in the Junior Ganymede Club's book, involving a women's lingerie shop named Eulalie.

=== Stage ===
- In the 1975 musical Jeeves, Spode was portrayed by John Turner, who also played Spode in the television series Jeeves and Wooster. Differing from the novels, Spode is referred to as Sir Roderick Spode in the musical. The character was dropped from the 1996 rewrite titled By Jeeves, in which the closest equivalent character is Cyrus Budge III Jnr, who is original to the musical.
- In the 2013 play Jeeves and Wooster in Perfect Nonsense, in which the events of The Code of the Woosters are reenacted by Bertie, Jeeves, and Aunt Dahlia's butler Seppings, Spode is portrayed by Seppings.

=== Radio ===
- In the 1973–1981 radio drama series What Ho! Jeeves, Spode was voiced by James Villiers (The Code of the Woosters) and Paul Eddington (Stiff Upper Lip, Jeeves). Spode is mentioned in the What Ho, Jeeves! adaptation of Jeeves and the Feudal Spirit but does not have a speaking role. His actions are described by other characters.
- In the 1997 L.A. Theatre Works radio adaptation of The Code of the Woosters, Spode was voiced by Martin Jarvis. Jarvis also voiced Jeeves in the same production, which was recorded live before an audience.
- In BBC Radio 4's 2006 adaptation of The Code of the Woosters for its Classic Serial series, Spode was voiced by Jack Klaff.
- Adam Godley voiced Spode in the 2018 BBC radio adaptation of Stiff Upper Lip, Jeeves.

== See also ==
- List of Jeeves characters, an alphabetical list of Jeeves characters
- List of P. G. Wodehouse characters in the Jeeves stories, a categorized outline of Jeeves characters
- List of Jeeves and Wooster characters, a list of characters in the television series
