= Richard Braine (actor) =

British actor

- Born: 1956 (age 68–69); Portishead, Somerset, England
- Occupations: Actor; playwright; theatre director

Richard Braine (born 1956) is a British television actor, playwright, and theatre director.

One of his most recognisable roles was that of Augustus "Gussie" Fink-Nottle in the ITV television third and fourth series Jeeves and Wooster based on the P.G. Wodehouse novels. In an earlier episode of the first series, he played the character Rupert Steggles. In Germany, Braine is known for appearing in a series of adverts for the Dinkel-Mini snack, after an outtake of his work on an advert for the brand appeared on a television bloopers programme and he was asked back to appear in subsequent ads.

His varied television career includes parts in EastEnders, Only Fools and Horses, The Brittas Empire and So What Now? and he has appeared in film roles in Bridget Jones: The Edge of Reason (2004), Finding Neverland (2004) and Calendar Girls (2003). He also played the character of XP, a space alien that loves prawn crisps who comes down to earth in the BBC Two schools programme The Experimenter to understand Earth life from Sarah, a schoolgirl friend played by Nadia Williams.

In 1997 Braine wrote and performed a one-man play, Being There With Peter Sellers, in which he played the actor who after attempting to stop another man's suicide finds himself reflecting on his own life. He also wrote Bedding Clay Jones and Sexing Alan Titchmarsh (2001). In 2006 Braine directed Steve Martin’s play The Underpants, his adaptation of The Trousers (play) Die Hose by Carl Sternheim, at The Old Red Lion, Islington.

In 2016 he appeared as Henry Kirkov in the BBC series Father Brown episode 4.4 "The Crackpot of the Empire". Theatre roles include Ratty in The Wind in the Willows at the Bristol Old Vic. He also played a vicar in As Time Goes By. In April 2020, he appeared in an episode of the BBC soap opera Doctors as Bernie Sutton.
