= Gussie Fink-Nottle =

Fictional character in P. G. Wodehouse stories

- Jeeves character
- Richard Garnett as Gussie giving his speech at Market Snodsbury Grammar School
- First appearance: Right Ho, Jeeves (1934)
- Last appearance: Stiff Upper Lip, Jeeves (1963)
- Created by: P. G. Wodehouse
- Portrayed by: Rex Garner; Richard Braine and others

In-universe information
- Full name: Augustus Fink-Nottle
- Alias: Alfred Duff Cooper
- Nickname: Gussie
- Gender: Male
- Nationality: British

Augustus "Gussie" Fink-Nottle is a recurring fictional character in the Jeeves novels of comic writer P. G. Wodehouse, being a lifelong friend of Jeeves's employer Bertie Wooster and a country member of the Drones Club. He wears horn-rimmed spectacles and studies newts.

== Life and character ==
A small young man, Gussie Fink-Nottle (called "Spink-Bottle" by Bertie Wooster's Aunt Dahlia) is one of Bertie's friends. He is described as fish-faced. He wears horn-rimmed, or tortoiseshell-rimmed spectacles. He went to a private school with Bertie Wooster, where they were close enough friends that they shared Bertie's last bar of chocolate. He had not been in London for over five years before meeting Madeline Bassett. Generally a teetotaller, he drinks whisky once, and says that it tastes unpleasantly like medicine, burns the throat and leaves one thirsty. His preferred drink is orange juice. Gussie is very shy in his first appearance, though he becomes more confident and assertive over time.

Having become interested in newts as a child, Gussie became more devoted to studying these creatures through university and afterward, eventually observing the amphibians in a pond at his home in Lincolnshire. Later, he carries newts around in glass tanks. Knowledgeable about the species, he describes the courtship practices of newts to Bertie Wooster and on another occasion provides a great deal of information on the subject to Madeline Bassett.

It is likely that Gussie is a member of the Drones Club. While Gussie's membership is not stated directly, there are at least three pieces of evidence suggesting he is a member of the Drones: at least five known Drones Club members attend the dinner celebrating Gussie's engagement to Madeline that Bertie gives Gussie at the Drones, Bertie states that Gussie loves cold steak and kidney pie so much that Bertie has known him to order it "even on curry day at the Drones", and it is implied by Wodehouse in a 1937 letter he wrote to The Times that one can find Gussie at the Drones Club. Gussie is described as a Drone in two books about Wodehouse's characters, Who's Who in Wodehouse by Daniel H. Garrison and Wodehouse in Woostershire by Tony Ring and Geoffrey Jaggard.

In Right Ho, Jeeves, Gussie drinks whisky to gather the courage to propose to Madeline Bassett (and also unknowingly drinks orange juice spiked with gin), and while under the influence of the drinks, ends up giving an uninhibited and noteworthy speech at Market Snodsbury Grammar School. In that story, he becomes engaged to Madeline, despite a temporary engagement to Bertie's cousin Angela Travers. His engagement to Madeline is ended and renewed in The Code of the Woosters, in which he also comes into conflict with Roderick Spode.

He is still engaged to Madeline through The Mating Season, though he tried to send her a letter ending their engagement, and he temporarily falls for Catsmeat Potter-Pirbright's sister Corky. Also in The Mating Season, Catsmeat makes Gussie climb into the Trafalgar Square fountain while clothed, and Gussie uses a false name twice. When in court after being arrested for wading in the Trafalgar Square fountain, he uses the alias "Alfred Duff Cooper" (who as Minister of Information had ordered the journalist "Cassandra" to deliver a radio broadcast denouncing Wodehouse as a Nazi collaborator), and he uses Bertie Wooster's name when pretending to be Bertie at Deverill Hall. In Stiff Upper Lip, Jeeves, his engagement to Madeline is ended for good after she tries to make him stick to a vegetarian diet, and Gussie elopes with Emerald Stoker.

== Appearances ==
Gussie appears in:

- Right Ho, Jeeves (1934)
- The Code of the Woosters (1938)
- The Mating Season (1949)
- Stiff Upper Lip, Jeeves (1963)

Gussie is mentioned in:

- Jeeves in the Offing (1960)
- Much Obliged, Jeeves (1971)
- Aunts Aren't Gentlemen (1974)

== Market Snodsbury Grammar School speech ==
The scene in Right Ho, Jeeves in which Gussie, thoroughly inebriated due to Jeeves and later Bertie Wooster lacing his orange juice with gin, as well as his massive drink of whisky, gives a speech at the Market Snodsbury Grammar School is often cited as among the finest vignettes in English literature.

Gussie goes to the boys' school to present prizes to the pupils (for spelling, drawing, etc.), with the boys' relatives and other members of the community in attendance. He is taking the place of Reverend William Plomer, who is out due to illness. After making some snide remarks to the previous speaker (a man with a beard who mistakenly calls Gussie "Fitz-Wattle"), Gussie, standing with his thumbs in the armholes of his waistcoat, begins to deliver his speech:

"Boys," said Gussie, "I mean ladies and gentlemen and boys, I will not detain you long, but I propose on this occasion to feel compelled to say a few auspicious words. Ladies – boys and ladies and gentlemen – we have all listened with interest to the remarks of our friend here who forgot to shave this morning – I don't know his name, but then he didn't know mine – Fitz-Wattle, I mean, absolutely absurd – which squares things up a bit – and we are all sorry that the Reverend What-ever-he-was-called should be dying of adenoids, but after all, here today, gone tomorrow, and all flesh is as grass, and what not, but that wasn't what I wanted to say. What I wanted to say was this – and I say it confidently – without fear of contradiction – I say, in short, I am happy to be here on this auspicious occasion and I take much pleasure in kindly awarding the prizes, consisting of the handsome books you see laid out on that table. As Shakespeare says, there are sermons in books, stones in the running brooks, or, rather, the other way about, and there you have it in a nutshell."

Gussie's grammar school speech is referenced in Jeeves in the Offing. Bertie recounts that at the grammar school, Gussie "had got pickled to the gills and made an outstanding exhibition of himself, setting up a mark at which all future orators would shoot in vain".

== Adaptations ==
Television

- In the 1990–1993 series Jeeves and Wooster, Gussie was portrayed by Richard Garnett in series 1 (episodes 4–5) and series 2 (episodes 1–2), and by Richard Braine in series 3 (episodes 4–5) and series 4 (episode 5).

Stage

- In the 1975 musical Jeeves, Gussie was portrayed by Christopher Good.
- In the 1996 premiere of By Jeeves, a rewrite of the previous musical, he was portrayed by Simon Day.
- Gussie is one of the characters portrayed in the 2013 play Jeeves and Wooster in Perfect Nonsense, in which Bertie, Jeeves, and the butler Seppings reenact the events of The Code of the Woosters.

Film

- James Kall portrayed Gussie in the 2001 recording of the musical By Jeeves.

Radio

- Gussie was voiced by Rolf Lefebvre in the 1956 BBC BBC Light Programme radio dramatisation of Right Ho, Jeeves.
- In the 1973–1981 series What Ho! Jeeves, Gussie was voiced by Rex Garner (Right Ho, Jeeves and The Code of the Woosters), David Valla (The Mating Season), and Jonathan Cecil (Stiff Upper Lip, Jeeves).
- In the 1988 BBC radio adaptation of Right Ho, Jeeves, Gussie was voiced by Trevor Nichols.
- In the 1997 L.A. Theatre Works radio adaptation of The Code of the Woosters, Gussie was voiced by Thomas M. Shea.
- In BBC Radio 4's 2006 adaptation of The Code of the Woosters for its Classic Serial series, Gussie was voiced by Jeremy Swift.
- Gussie was voiced by Matthew Wolf in the 2018 BBC radio adaptation of Stiff Upper Lip, Jeeves.

== See also ==
- List of Jeeves characters, an alphabetical list of Jeeves characters
- List of P. G. Wodehouse characters in the Jeeves stories, a categorized outline of Jeeves characters
- List of Jeeves and Wooster characters, a list of characters in the television series
