= Jeeves and Wooster =

British comedy-drama television series (1990–1993)

- Based on: Jeeves stories by P. G. Wodehouse
- Screenplay by: Clive Exton
- Starring: Hugh Laurie; Stephen Fry
- Composer: Anne Dudley
- Country of origin: United Kingdom
- Original language: English
- No. of series: 4
- No. of episodes: 23 (list of episodes)

Production
- Executive producer: Sally Head
- Producer: Brian Eastman
- Running time: 50 minutes
- Production companies: Picture Partnership; Productions; Granada Television

Original release
- Network: ITV
- Release: 22 April 1990 – 20 June 1993

Jeeves and Wooster is a British comedy television series adapted by Clive Exton from P. G. Wodehouse's "Jeeves" stories. It aired on the ITV network from 22 April 1990 to 20 June 1993, with the last series nominated for a British Academy Television Award for Best Drama Series. Set in the UK and the US in an unspecified period between the late 1920s and the 1930s, the series starred Hugh Laurie as Bertie Wooster, an affable young gentleman and member of the idle rich, and Stephen Fry as Jeeves, his highly intelligent and competent valet. Bertie and his friends, who are mainly members of the Drones Club, are extricated from all manner of societal misadventures by the indispensable Jeeves.

When Fry and Laurie began the series, they were already a popular comedic double act for their regular appearances on Channel 4's Saturday Live and their own show A Bit of Fry & Laurie (BBC, 1987–95).

In the television documentary Fry and Laurie Reunited (2010), the actors, reminiscing about their involvement in the series, revealed that they were initially reluctant to play the parts of Jeeves and Wooster, but eventually decided to do so because the series was going to be made with or without them, and they felt no one else would do the parts justice.

The series was a collaboration between Brian Eastman of Picture Partnership Productions and Granada Television.

== Theme and opening credits ==
The theme (called "Jeeves and Wooster") is an original piece of music in the jazz/swing style written by composer Anne Dudley for the programme. Dudley uses variations of the theme as a basis for all of the episodes' scores and was nominated for a British Academy Television Award for her work on the third series. The final series won a British Academy Television Award for Best Graphics for the Art Deco animated title by Derek W. Hayes and was nominated for a British Academy Television Award for Best Drama Series. Writing in Art of the Title, Lola Landekic commended Hayes' opening sequence, saying "[it] provided a modern and elegant cornerstone, easing audiences into the rhythm and tone of the show."

== Characters ==
Stephen Fry (left) as Jeeves and Hugh Laurie as Bertie Wooster

Many of the programme's supporting roles – including significant characters such as Aunt Agatha, Madeline Bassett and Gussie Fink-Nottle – were played by more than one actor. One prominent character, Aunt Dahlia, was played by a different actress in each of the four series. Francesca Folan played two very different characters: Madeline Bassett in series one and Lady Florence Craye in series four. The character of Stiffy Byng was played by Charlotte Attenborough in series two and by Amanda Harris in series three and then by Attenborough again in series four. Richard Braine, who took over the role of Gussie Fink-Nottle in series three and four, also appeared as the conniving Rupert Steggles in series one. Aside from Fry and Laurie, the only actors to appear as the same character in all four series are John Woodnutt as Sir Watkyn Bassett and Robert Daws as Tuppy Glossop.

== Episodes ==
Series	Episodes	Originally released	
Series	Episodes	First released	Last released
1	5	22 April 1990	20 May 1990
2	6	14 April 1991	19 May 1991
3	6	29 March 1992	3 May 1992
4	6	16 May 1993	20 June 1993

== Reception ==
The third series of Jeeves and Wooster won a British Academy Television Award for Best Design for Eileen Diss. The final series won a British Academy Television Award for Best Graphics for Derek W. Hayes and was nominated for a British Academy Television Award for Best Drama Series; it also earned a British Academy Television Award for Best Original Television Music for Anne Dudley and a British Academy Television Award for Best Costume Design for Dany Everett. In retrospect, Michael Brooke of BFI Screenonline called screenwriter Clive Exton "the series' real star", saying his "adaptations come surprisingly close to capturing the flavour of the originals" by "retaining many of Wodehouse's most inspired literary similes."

Christopher Lee analyzed the costumes of both Jeeves and Wooster for the Gentleman's Gazette, and concludes that "Wooster represents the dandy, willing to experiment with style and change. Jeeves is the voice of tradition and conservative style."

== Home releases ==
Granada Media released the four series on DVD in Region 2 between 2000 and 2002. On 1 September 2008, ITV Studios Home Entertainment released Jeeves and Wooster: The Complete Collection, an eight-disc box set featuring all 23 episodes of the series.

In Region 1, A&E Home Entertainment, under licence from Granada Media Entertainment, released the 23-episode collection on DVD in the US and Canada. In Region 4, Shock Entertainment has released the series on DVD in Australia. It was initially released in season sets in 2007–2008, followed by a complete series collection on 4 August 2008.

DVD title	Discs	Episode count	Release dates		
DVD title	Discs	Episode count	Region 1	Region 2	Region 4
Complete Series 1	2	5	27 March 2001	23 October 2000	5 September 2007
Complete Series 2	2	6	27 March 2001	28 May 2001	2 December 2007
Complete Series 3	2	6	2 January 2002	17 June 2002	31 January 2008
Complete Series 4	2	6	26 March 2002	16 September 2002	5 May 2008
Complete Collection	8	23	26 November 2002	1 September 2008	4 August 2008

== See also ==
British sitcom
