= The World Is Not Enough (disambiguation) =

The World Is Not Enough is a 1999 James Bond film.

The World Is Not Enough may also refer to:

== Arts and entertainment ==
- The World Is Not Enough (soundtrack), the film's soundtrack
  - "The World Is Not Enough" (song), the film's theme song
- The World Is Not Enough (Nintendo 64 video game), a video game adaptation of the film that was released in 2000
- The World Is Not Enough (PlayStation video game), a video game adaptation of the film that was released in 2000
- The World Is Not Enough (Game Boy Color video game), a video game adaptation of the film that was released in 2001
- The World Is Not Enough (novel), a novelization of the film
- The World Is Not Enough, a 1946 novel by Zoé Oldenbourg

== Other uses ==
- World Is Not Enough (spacecraft propulsion), a refuelable spacecraft propulsion concept that works on water steam

== See also ==
- Orbis non sufficit, a quotation from the Satires, later used as a motto by Philip II of Spain
