= The World Is Not Enough (soundtrack) =

The World Is Not Enough: Music from the MGM Motion Picture

Soundtrack album by David Arnold
- Released: November 9, 1999
- Recorded: September 1999
- Studio: AIR Studios (London)
- Genre: Soundtrack
- Length: 68 minutes
- Label: Radioactive/MCA
- Producer: David Arnold

David Arnold chronology
Godzilla (1998)	The World Is Not Enough: Music from the MGM Motion Picture (1999)	Shaft (2000)

Singles from The World Is Not Enough
- 1. "The World Is Not Enough" Released: November 15, 1999

Professional ratings
Review scores
Source	Rating
AllMusic	4/5 stars
Empire	5/5 stars
Filmtracks	3/5 stars

The World Is Not Enough: Music from the MGM Motion Picture is the 1999 soundtrack of the 19th James Bond film of the same name and the second Bond soundtrack composed by David Arnold. The score features more instances of electronic music, which Arnold included to "make the thing a little more contemporary". To add an ethnic flavor to tracks that conveyed the film's Turkey and Central Asia setting, Arnold brought in percussionist Pete Lockett, qanun player Abdullah Chhadeh, and singer Natacha Atlas.

Arnold broke tradition by not ending the film with a new song or a reprise of the opening theme. Originally, Arnold intended to use the song "Only Myself to Blame", written by David Arnold & Don Black and sung by Scott Walker and inspired by the failed romance between James Bond (Pierce Brosnan) and Elektra King (Sophie Marceau), who turns out to be a villain. However, director Michael Apted "felt it was too much of a downer for the end of the movie" and Arnold replaced it with a techno remix of the "James Bond Theme". "Only Myself to Blame", is the nineteenth and final track on the album.

The soundtrack was recorded across six days in September 1999 by an 83-piece orchestra conducted by Arnold collaborator Nicholas Dodd. Dodd described The World Is Not Enough as his favorite Bond score.

Elektra King was provided with her own theme, most prominently heard in "Casino," "Elektra's Theme" and "I Never Miss." Arnold added two new themes to the Bond repertoire with this score, both of which are reused in the next Bond film, Die Another Day (2002). The first is an action theme, performed on the upper-registers of the piano, heard during "Pipeline" and "Submarine." The second is a romance theme, first heard in the film during the skiing sequence as "Snow Business", available on the La-La Land Records extended soundtrack release, but not heard here until the "Christmas in Turkey" cue in a simple arrangement for piano. Neil Hannon of The Divine Comedy also wrote a theme song for the film, but it was rejected. The album reached #106 on the UK Albums Chart.

The initial release was an enhanced CD which included the US theatrical trailer. A second release (MVCE-24204) contained "Sweetest Coma Again" by Luna Sea featuring DJ Krush which played during the end credits of the Japanese version of the film. In 2018, La-La Land Records released a two-disc limited and expanded edition of the complete score by Arnold. The title song is also contained in the release along with some unreleased material.

== Track listing ==
1. "The World Is Not Enough" – Garbage (Note: contains the "James Bond Theme", originally composed for the Dr. No soundtrack)
2. "Show Me the Money"
3. "Come in 007, Your Time Is Up"
4. "Access Denied"
5. "M's Confession"
6. "Welcome to Baku"
7. "Casino"
8. "Ice Bandits"
9. "Elektra's Theme"
10. "Body Double"
11. "Going Down/The Bunker"
12. "Pipeline"
13. "Remember Pleasure"
14. "Caviar Factory"
15. "Torture Queen"
16. "I Never Miss"
17. "Submarine"
18. "Christmas in Turkey"
19. "Only Myself to Blame" – Scott Walker (David Arnold/Don Black)
20. "Sweetest Coma Again"* – Luna Sea featuring DJ Krush

* Track 20 is only included in the Japanese album release.

== See also ==
- Outline of James Bond
