= Jeeves and the Yule-tide Spirit =

- Short story by P. G. Wodehouse
- Country: United Kingdom
- Language: English
- Genre: Comedy

Publication
- Publisher: The Strand Magazine
- Media type: Print (Magazine)
- Publication date: December 1927

Chronology
- Series: Jeeves
The Inferiority Complex of Old Sippy	Jeeves and the Song of Songs

"Jeeves and the Yule-tide Spirit" is a short story by P. G. Wodehouse, and features the young gentleman Bertie Wooster and his valet Jeeves. The story was published in The Strand Magazine in the United Kingdom in December 1927, and in Liberty in the United States that same month. The story was also included as the third story in the 1930 collection Very Good, Jeeves.

In the story, Bertie has fallen in love with the mischievous Roberta "Bobbie" Wickham, though Jeeves has misgivings about her. Bertie wants to get revenge on "Tuppy" Glossop for playing a trick on him, and Bobbie suggests a scheme involving a long stick, a darning needle, and a hot water bottle.

== Plot ==
Lady Wickham has invited Bertie to her home, Skeldings Hall, for Christmas. Bertie and Jeeves had originally planned to go to Monte Carlo, but Bertie takes up Lady Wickham's invitation, which disappoints Jeeves. Bertie's Aunt Agatha calls and tells Bertie to behave himself at Skeldings, since Lady Wickham is her friend. Sir Roderick Glossop will also be there, and Aunt Agatha has convinced him to give Bertie another chance to demonstrate that he is not mentally unsound.

At Skeldings Hall, Bertie encounters Lady Wickham, her daughter Bobbie Wickham, and Sir Roderick Glossop, who is surprisingly cordial to Bertie. Bertie sees that Jeeves is upset about missing Monte Carlo, and explains his three reasons for coming to Skeldings: first, there is more Yule-tide spirit in Skeldings; second, Bertie wants to get revenge on Tuppy Glossop, Sir Roderick's nephew, because Tuppy once tricked him into falling into the Drones Club swimming pool; third, Bertie is in love with Bobbie. Jeeves says that Bobbie, though a charming young lady, is too volatile and frivolous for Bertie. Jeeves also believes that Bobbie's vivid red hair is a dangerous sign. Bertie dismisses Jeeves's concerns.

Later, Bertie tells Jeeves that Bobbie proposed a clever scheme for his revenge. Bertie will tie a large darning needle to the end of a long stick, then sneak into Tuppy's room at night and puncture Tuppy's hot water bottle while he is asleep. Jeeves objects, but Bertie insists that Jeeves prepare the stick and needle. Jeeves informs Bertie where Tuppy sleeps. At half-past two on Christmas morning, Bertie sneaks into Tuppy's room and punctures the hot water bottle. Then the door loudly falls shut, which wakes the occupant of the bed, who, to Bertie's surprise, is not Tuppy, but Sir Roderick Glossop. Angry, Sir Roderick tells Bertie that he and Tuppy had changed rooms. He had asked Jeeves to tell this to Bertie. Bertie feels betrayed by Jeeves. His bed ruined, Sir Roderick leaves to sleep in Bertie's bed instead. Defeated, Bertie sleeps on an armchair.

"You mean to say that, after she had put me up to the scheme of puncturing Tuppy's hot-water bottle, she went away and tipped Tuppy off to puncturing mine?"
"Precisely, sir. She is a young lady with a keen sense of humour, sir."
I sat there, you might say stunned.

— Bertie and Jeeves discuss Bobbie's betrayal

Bertie wakes to see Jeeves standing with tea. Jeeves greets him, "Merry Christmas, sir!". When asked, Jeeves confesses he knew about Tuppy's room change, but had allowed Bertie's plan to proceed in order to ruin any chance of Glossop approving a marriage between his daughter and Bertie. Bertie is instantly moved, and feels he has wronged Jeeves. Jeeves adds that a second incident occurred during the night: while in Bertie's bed, Sir Roderick's hot water bottle was pierced by Tuppy, who thought Bertie was in the bed. As a joke, Bobbie had suggested this idea to Tuppy, after she had suggested the idea to Bertie. Bertie is stunned by Bobbie's betrayal, and does not love her anymore. To avoid Sir Roderick and Aunt Agatha, Jeeves suggests that Bertie go to Monte Carlo, since Jeeves already booked accommodations there and forgot to cancel them. Bertie agrees.

== Literary and Biblical allusions ==
Wodehouse invariably has Bertie Wooster using – or misusing – many literary and Biblical allusions. In this short story, Bertie makes these references:

- "As Shakespeare says, if you’re going to do a thing you might just as well pop right at it and get it over": refers to "If it were done when 'tis done, then 'twere well it were done quickly" in Macbeth, Act I, scene vii, by William Shakespeare.
- "Makes him realise that life is stern and life is earnest": refers to "Life is real! Life is earnest!" in "A Psalm of Life", by Henry Wadsworth Longfellow.
- "Honoria … had a laugh like waves breaking on a stern and rock-bound coast": refers to "The breaking waves dashed high on a stern and rock-bound coast" in "The Landing of the Pilgrim Fathers", by Elizabeth Barrett Browning.
- "It seemed to me that even at Christmas-time, with all the peace on earth and goodwill towards men that there is knocking about at that season, a reunion with this bloke was likely to be tough going": refers to "Glory to God in the highest, and on earth peace, good will toward men" in Luke 2:14.
- "my view was that it practically amounted to the lion lying down with the lamb": refers to "The wolf also shall dwell with the lamb, and the leopard shall lie down with the kid; and the calf and the young lion and the fatling together; and a little child shall lead them" in Isaiah 11:6.
- "And now that there has been a change of programme the iron has entered into your soul": refers to "The iron entered into his soul" in Psalms 105:18 in the Psalter.
- "a fellow with light hair and a Cheshire-cat grin": refers to the fictional cat in Alice's Adventures in Wonderland by Lewis Carroll.
- "I have it in for that man of wrath": refers to "A man of wrath stirs up strife, and a man given to anger causes much transgression" in Proverbs 29:22.
- "And then I found that this fiend in human shape had looped it back against the rail": refers to "Oh! that fiend in human shape, next to her, knew human—female—nature well" in The Scarlet Pimpernel by Baroness Emmuska Orczy.
- "bringing myself out wreathed in blushes": refers to "Dimly gleaming Dian's horn Sinketh westward faintly fair, Soon will haste the opal morn Wreathed in blushes debonair" in "Serenades" by Samuel Minturn Peck.
- "she was suggesting the ripest, fruitiest, brainiest scheme for bringing young Tuppy's grey hairs in sorrow to the grave": refers to "then shall ye bring down my grey hairs with sorrow to the grave" in Genesis 42:38.
- "one would occasionally heave a jug of water over another bloke during the night-watches": refers to "When I remember thee upon my bed, and meditate on thee in the night watches" in Psalms 63:6.
- "I shook off the mists of sleep": refers to "A glorious voice sounds through the night, And chides the darkness into light: The mists of sleep are driv'n afar, And Christ shines forth the Morning Star" in the traditional hymn "A Glorious Voice Sounds Through The Night".
- "It was only by summoning up all the old bull-dog courage of the Woosters": refers to "Now, England, now thy bull-dog courage show" in "The Battle of Fontenoy": a historical poem, by William Joseph Corbet.
- "the last Trump": refers to "In a moment, in the twinkling of an eye, at the last trump" in First Corinthians 15:52.
- "had let me rush upon my doom": perhaps refers to "O then like those, who clench their nerves to rush Upon their dissolution" in "Love and Duty" by Alfred Lord Tennyson.

== Publication history ==
The story's title is sometimes written as "Jeeves and the Yule-Tide Spirit" or "Jeeves and the Yuletide Spirit". It was illustrated by Charles Crombie in the Strand and by Wallace Morgan in Liberty. It appeared in the periodical Scholastic in 1939.

The story was included in the 1932 collection Nothing But Wodehouse, and in the 1949 collection The Best of Wodehouse. The collections Selected Stories by P. G. Wodehouse, published in 1958, and Vintage Wodehouse, published 1978, also featured the story.

The anthology The Fireside Treasury of Modern Humor, published by Simon and Schuster in 1963, included the story.

Bertie Wooster's tendency to abbreviate words caused confusion with printers when this story was printed in Very Good, Jeeves. Wodehouse wrote in August 1930 to Arnold Bennett about a mistake he noticed in the galley proof of the book, stating in his letter to Bennett:

In one place I had written 'festive s.', meaning 'festive season', & they printed it 'festives'. So I wrote on the margin of the galley as follows: – "Not 'festives'. Please print this as two words 'festive s.', – 'festive' one word, 's' another. Bertie occasionally clips his words, so that when he means 'festive season' he says 'festive s.' This is quite clear, isn't it? 'Festive' one word, 's' another?" And so the book has come out with the thing printed as 'festives'. I see now that I didn't make it clear enough.

"Festives" was used for the 1930 British edition of Very Good, Jeeves, and became "the festivities" in the American edition. It was changed to "Christmas" in the 1931 Jeeves Omnibus. "Festives" appears in the 2008 Arrow Books (British) edition: "'We have here a communication from Lady Wickham. She has written inviting me to Skeldings for the festives.'"

== Adaptations ==
=== Television ===
This story was adapted into the Jeeves and Wooster episode "Tuppy and the Terrier", the second episode of the first series, which first aired on 29 April 1990. There are some changes in plot, including:

- The episode does not take place during Christmas. Instead, Bertie tries to impress Bobbie during the annual Drones Club golf tournament, where Bertie faces off against Barmy Fotheringay-Phipps, who uses an illegal golf club.
- In the episode there is no mention of the Drones Club pool incident, and Bertie does not want to get revenge on Tuppy; instead, he wants revenge on Barmy for defeating him with an illegal golf club.
- In the original story Jeeves was not informed in advance of Tuppy's intentions to use a darning needle and stick like Bertie; in the episode, Barmy asks Jeeves for a darning needle and stick.
- Sir Roderick Glossop does not appear in the episode. He is replaced by a Romanian couple.
- There is no mention of Monte Carlo in the episode; instead, Jeeves disapproves of Bertie's plus sixes.

=== Radio ===
A reading of "Jeeves and the Yule-tide Spirit" by actor Martin Jarvis in front of an invited theatre audience was first aired on BBC Radio 4 as part of the Jeeves Live series on 17 December 2017.
