= Jeeves' Arrival =

- Jeeves and Wooster episode
- Episode no.: Season 1 Episode 1
- Directed by: Robert Young
- Original air date: 22 April 1990

Episode chronology
← Previous —	Next → "Tuppy and the Terrier"

"Jeeves' Arrival" is the first episode of the first series of the 1990s British comedy television series Jeeves and Wooster. It is also called "In Court after the Boat Race" or "Jeeves Takes Charge". It first aired in the UK on 22 April 1990 on ITV. The episode aired in the US on 11 November 1990 on Masterpiece Theatre.

== Background ==
Adapted from "Jeeves Takes Charge" (collected in Carry On, Jeeves), and "Scoring off Jeeves" and "Sir Roderick Comes to Lunch" (both collected in The Inimitable Jeeves).

== Cast ==
- Bertie Wooster – Hugh Laurie
- Jeeves – Stephen Fry
- Aunt Agatha – Mary Wimbush
- Bingo Little – Michael Siberry
- Honoria Glossop – Elizabeth Kettle
- Sir Roderick Glossop – Roger Brierley
- Lady Glossop – Jane Downs
- Oswald Glossop – Alastair Haley
- Sir Watkyn Bassett – John Woodnutt
- Lord Rainsby – Jason Calder
- Eustace Wooster – Ian Jeffs
- Claude Wooster – Hugo E. Blick
- Barmy Fotheringay Phipps – Adam Blackwood
- Drones Porter – Michael Ripper
- Cabbie – Tim Barker

== Plot ==
This episode opens with Bertie Wooster being fined the sum of £5 after stealing a policeman's helmet on the night of the Oxford-Cambridge boat race. He arrives at his apartment, still hungover, when Jeeves arrives. Wooster agrees to take him on as his valet, after Jeeves makes a concoction that instantly cures his hangover.

Bertie Wooster's Aunt Agatha orders him to marry Honoria Glossop, whom Agatha believes will "reform" him. Bertie, not enamoured with the idea, finds that his friend Bingo Little is infatuated with her. In order to get Honoria's love, Bingo Little produces a plan which involves Bertie Wooster throwing Honoria's little brother Oswald in the river. Bingo Little would save the boy in order to get her love. But the plan to get Bingo and Honoria together fails. Bertie has to jump into the water to rescue Honorias's brother, and Honoria falls in love with Bertie Wooster. His capable new valet Jeeves steps in with a plan to convince Sir Roderick and Lady Glossop that their potential son-in-law is unfit to marry their daughter.

== See also ==
- List of Jeeves and Wooster characters
