= Tuppy and the Terrier =

- Jeeves and Wooster episode
- Episode no.: Season 1 Episode 2
- Directed by: Robert Young
- Original air date: 29 April 1990

Episode chronology
← Previous "Jeeves' Arrival"	Next → "The Purity of the Turf"

"Tuppy and the Terrier" is the second episode of the first series of the 1990s British comedy television series Jeeves and Wooster. It is also called "Bertie Is In Love" or "The Golf Tournament". It first aired in the UK on 29 April 1990 on ITV. The episode aired in the US on 18 November 1990 on Masterpiece Theatre.

== Background ==
Adapted from "Jeeves and the Yuletide Spirit", "Episode of the Dog McIntosh", and "Jeeves and the Song of Songs" (all collected in Very Good, Jeeves).

== Cast ==
- Bertie Wooster – Hugh Laurie
- Jeeves – Stephen Fry
- Aunt Agatha – Mary Wimbush
- Aunt Dahlia – Brenda Bruce
- Tuppy Glossop – Robert Daws
- Bobbie Wickham – Nina Botting
- Barmy Fotheringay-Phipps – Adam Blackwood
- Lady Wickham – Rosemary Martin
- Sir Cuthbert Wickham – Brian Haines
- Cora Bellinger – Constance Novis
- Professor Cluj – Michael Poole
- Aneta Cluj – Zulema Dene
- Mr. Blumenfield – Billy J. Mitchell
- Sydney Blumenfield – Anatol Yusef
- Enoch Simpson – David Blake Kelly
- Rev Beefy Bingham – Owen Brenman
- Drones Porter – Michael Ripper

== Plot ==
Bertie Wooster is determined to propose to Roberta Wickham ("Bobbie"). When Barmy Fotheringay Phipps defeats him at golf, Roberta ("Bobbie") recommends an idea for a practical joke by sneaking into Barmy's bedroom at night and puncturing the hot-water bottle with a darning needle attached to a stick. At 2:30 in the morning, Bertie goes to the bedroom with the stick and needle. In the darkened room, he successfully punctures the hot-water bottle. But, when the door slams and wakes the person sleeping there, Bertie realises that it is Prof Cluj and his wife, instead of Barmy. Bertie punctured the hot-water bottle of Aneta Cluj. Bertie tries to escape from the room, but his dressing gown catches on the door, and Prof Cluj catches him. Bertie explains that he was looking for Barmy, and Prof Cluj tells Bertie that he had switched rooms with Barmy. Prof Cluj's wife Aneta discovers the punctured hot-water bottle and they are furious with Bertie. They go to Bertie's room to spend the rest of the night, leaving their room to Bertie. Bertie spends the night in an armchair.

Bertie Wooster is made to watch Aunt Agatha's over-pampered dog McIntosh and is horrified when Roberta ("Bobbie") gives the dog to the spoilt son of a Broadway producer. Tuppy Glossop is infatuated with an opera singer, Cora Bellinger, and has dropped Bertie's cousin Angela. Her mother, Aunt Dahlia, wants this affair over with, and Jeeves produces a plan, which involves Bertie singing in public.

== See also ==
- List of Jeeves and Wooster characters
