= World Enough and Time =

World Enough and Time is a phrase from the poem "To His Coy Mistress" by Andrew Marvell, published in 1681, which has been used in the title of various other works:

== Literature and Science ==
- World Enough and Time, a 1950 novel by Robert Penn Warren
- The Memoirs of Aga Khan: World Enough and Time, the 1954 autobiography of Sir Sultan Muhammed Shah, Aga Khan III
- World Enough, and Time, a 1980 novel by James Kahn
- "#ifdefDEBUG + 'world/enough' + 'time'", a short story by Terry Pratchett in the 1982 anthology A Blink of the Screen
- World Enough and Space-Time, a 1989 philosophical treatment of Newton's conception of absolute space by John Earman
- Worlds Enough and Time, 1992 novel by Joe Haldeman
- World Enough and Time: The Life of Andrew Marvell, a 1999 biography of the poet Andrew Marvell by Nicholas Murray
- Worlds Enough & Time, a 2002 novella collection by Dan Simmons

== Film and television ==
- "World Enough and Time" (Star Trek: New Voyages), an episode of Star Trek: New Voyages
- "World Enough and Time" (Doctor Who), an episode of the tenth series of Doctor Who
- "World Enough and Time", an episode of the second series of The Diary of River Song audio drama

== See also ==
- Had We But World Enough, a 1950 Australian play by Oriel Gray
- "Had We But World Enough", a 1940 short story by Shirley Jackson
- The World Is Not Enough (disambiguation)
