= Adam Blackwood (actor) =

English actor

- Born: 14 July 1959 (age 66); Chichester, West Sussex, England
- Occupation: Actor
- Years active: 1981–present
- Spouse: Nicola King (m. 1989)
- Children: 2

Adam Blackwood (born 14 July 1959) is an English actor.

== Early life ==
Blackwood was born in Chichester, West Sussex, the only son of Rona (née Archer) and John Blackwood. He attended the Royal Academy of Dramatic Art (RADA).

== Career ==
Blackwood played Balazar in the first four episodes of the 1986 Doctor Who serial The Trial of a Time Lord. He has provided the voice of Valentin Zukovsky in James Bond video games: The World Is Not Enough (Nintendo 64, PlayStation) and 007 Racing.

Blackwood retired from acting in 2002 and since then has run Private Drama Events, a company specialising in corporate storytelling

== Personal life ==
Blackwood has an older sister, Nicola, and a younger sister, Catriona. In 1989, he married Nicola King in Haywards Heath, West Sussex. They have a son named Thomas and a daughter named Ruby.

== Filmography ==
=== Film ===
Year	Title	Role	Notes
1984	A Passage to India	Mr. Hadley	
1985	Love Song	Bob Prescott	TV film
1987	Cause célèbre	Ewan Montagu	TV film
1993	Diana: Her True Story	Christopher	TV film
1995	The Old Curiosity Shop	Dick Swiveller	TV film
1995	Kidnapped	Captain Forbes	TV film
1998	A Candle in the Dark: The Story of William Carey	Thomas	TV film
1999	The Nearly Complete and Utter History of Everything	Norman	TV film

=== Television ===
Year	Title	Role	Notes
1981	Blake's 7	Tok	Episode: "Assassin"
1982	Stalky & Co.	Flint	Mini-series
1982	Play for Tomorrow	Boy	Episode: "Bright Eyes"
1982	Radio Phoenix	Andrew Maine	
1983	Play for Today		Episode: "The Last Term"
1983	By the Sword Divided	Ensign Peter Crane	3 episodes
1984	Sharing Time	Nigel	Episode: "Together Forever"
1986	Doctor Who	Balazar	Episodes: "The Trial of a Time-Lord"
1987	A Killing on the Exchange	Sergeant Ballantyne	Mini-series
1987	Bulman	Barty Geraldine	Episode: "Death by Misadventure"
1988	London's Burning	David McBeth	1 episode
1988	Crossbow	Troll	Episode: "Trolls"
1989	Great Expectations	Herbert Pocket	Episode: "Chapter One"
1990	Jeeves and Wooster	Barmy Fotheringay Phipps	4 episodes
1993	The Bill	Brian Cattlin	Episode: "No Comment"
1994	The Tomorrow People	Dr. Poole	3 episodes
1994	Harry Enfield & Chums	Chris Chapman	1 episodes
1996	Crucial Tales	Nash	Episode: "Phoenix"
1999	EastEnders	Dr. Viner	1 episode
2001	Midsomer Murders	Keith Shortlands	Episode: "Dark Autumn"
2003	Cambridge Spies	Oliver Lester	1 episode
2004	My Dad's the Prime Minister	Backbencher	Series regular

=== Video games ===
Year	Title	Role	Notes
1999	Tomorrow Never Dies	James Bond	Voice role
2000	The World Is Not Enough	Valentin Zukovsky	Voice role
2000	007 Racing	Valentin Zukovsky	Voice role
