= A Killing on the Exchange =

- TV tie-in novel
- Genre: Crime drama
- Created by: Paul Ableman
- Directed by: Graham Evans
- Starring: John Duttine; Gavan O'Herlihy; Tim Woodward; Lesa Lockford; Siân Phillips; Charlie Dore; Kenneth Farrington; Jaye Griffiths; Kim Thomson; Joss Ackland; Adam Blackwood
- Theme music composer: Richard Harvey
- Country of origin: United Kingdom
- Original language: English
- No. of series: 1
- No. of episodes: 6

Production
- Producer: John Rosenberg
- Cinematography: Spencer Chapman
- Running time: 50 minutes
- Production company: Anglia Television

Original release
- Network: ITV
- Release: 6 March – 10 April 1987

A Killing on the Exchange is a six-part British television crime drama series, first broadcast on 6 March 1987, that aired on ITV. The series was written by Paul Ableman and produced by Anglia Television.

The series also starred Tim Woodward, Siân Phillips, Kenneth Farrington, Jaye Griffiths, Kim Thomson and Joss Ackland in supporting roles. A tie-in novel, also written by Paul Ableman, was published on 19 February 1987. Notably, the series has never been released on DVD.

== Premise ==
The series centres on the ambitious, flinty City of London Detective Superintendent Lance Thorne (John Duttine), who is called in to investigate the murder of merchant banker Charles Makepeace (Michael Gough), a top financier whose death uncovers a web of deceit and double dealing in the high-flying world of banking and international finance, where jealousy and lust are rife amongst the suspects. Among the suspects are two young bankers – Londoner John Field and Dan Maitland, the privileged son of a billionaire American banker.

== Cast ==
- John Duttine as Det. Supt. Lance Thorne
- Gavan O'Herlihy as Dan Maitland
- Tim Woodward as John Field
- Lesa Lockford as Millicent Thorne
- Siân Phillips as Isobel Makepeace
- Charlie Dore as Grace Field
- Kenneth Farrington as Mr. Morrison
- Jaye Griffiths as Diana
- Kim Thomson as Kate MacRenny
- Joss Ackland as Sir Max Sillman
- Adam Blackwood as Sgt. Ballantyne
- Yvonne Bonnamy as Nina Novotny
- Laura Venn as Evey Field

== Episodes ==
Episode	Title	Written by	Directed by	Original release date
1	"Episode 1"	Paul Ableman	Graham Evans	6 March 1987
2	"Episode 2"	Paul Ableman	Graham Evans	13 March 1987
3	"Episode 3"	Paul Ableman	Graham Evans	20 March 1987
4	"Episode 4"	Paul Ableman	Graham Evans	27 March 1987
5	"Episode 5"	Paul Ableman	Graham Evans	3 April 1987
6	"Episode 6"	Paul Ableman	Graham Evans	10 April 1987
