= Scoring off Jeeves =

- Short story by P. G. Wodehouse
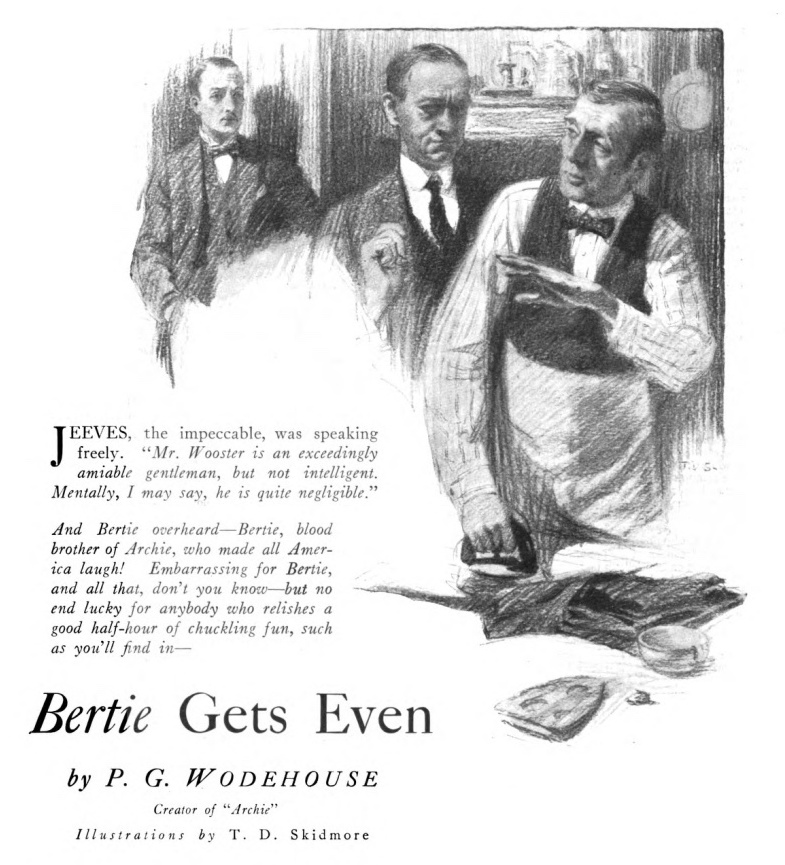
- 1922 Cosmopolitan title illustration by T. D. Skidmore
- Illustrator: A. Wallis Mills
- Country: United Kingdom
- Language: English
- Genre: Comedy

Publication
- Publisher: The Strand Magazine (UK); Cosmopolitan (US)
- Media type: Print (Magazine)
- Publication date: February 1922 (UK); March 1922 (US)

Chronology
- Series: Jeeves
Aunt Agatha Takes the Count	Sir Roderick Comes to Lunch

"Scoring off Jeeves" (also published as "Bertie Gets Even") is a short story by P. G. Wodehouse, that features a young gentleman Bertie Wooster and his valet Jeeves. The story was published in The Strand Magazine in London in February 1922, and then in Cosmopolitan in New York in March 1922. The story was also included in the 1923 collection The Inimitable Jeeves as two separate chapters, "The Pride of the Woosters Is Wounded" and "The Hero's Reward".

In the story, Bertie's Aunt Agatha wants him to marry the formidable Honoria Glossop, who intimidates Bertie. Bertie tries to thwart his aunt's plan without help from Jeeves.

== Plot ==
=== The Pride of the Woosters Is Wounded ===
Jeeves's annual vacation is coming up. While Jeeves is preparing the substitute valet who will serve in his absence, Bertie overhears him inform the substitute that Mr. Wooster is "mentally negligible". Bertie is offended.

Later, Bertie goes to a club for a drink, to fortify himself for his upcoming lunch with his overbearing Aunt Agatha. At the club, Bertie sees his friend Bingo Little. Bingo is living at Ditteredge Hall, the country house of the Glossop family, as a tutor to the Glossops' son, Oswald; Bertie is an acquaintance of the son's older sister, Honoria. Bingo declares that he has fallen in love with Honoria, surprising Bertie, who finds Honoria's aggressive personality frightening.

It wasn't two minutes after I had parted from Aunt Agatha before the old fighting spirit of the Woosters reasserted itself. Ghastly as the peril was which loomed before me, I was conscious of a rummy sort of exhilaration. It was a tight corner, but the tighter the corner, I felt, the more juicily should I score off Jeeves when I got myself out of it without a bit of help from him.

— Bertie wants to prove Jeeves wrong

At lunch, Aunt Agatha tells Bertie that she has found a capable girl for Bertie to marry: Honoria Glossop. Bertie, shocked, tries to reject this idea, but Aunt Agatha intimidates Bertie into visiting Ditteredge Hall. Bertie decides to prove Jeeves wrong and get himself out of Aunt Agatha's scheme without Jeeves's help.

At Ditteredge, Bertie finds Bingo, and Oswald, who is fishing from a bridge. Oswald irritates Bertie. Bertie suggests that Bingo shove Oswald into the water. Bingo likes the idea, but declines, knowing that Honoria loves Oswald. Inspired, Bertie formulates a plan: Bingo will hide in nearby bushes while Bertie lures Honoria close to the bridge, and then Bertie will push Oswald off, so that Bingo can impress Honoria by rescuing Oswald. Bingo agrees to the plan.

=== The Hero's Reward ===
Honoria and her friend, Daphne Braythwayt, arrive at Ditteredge. Bertie lures Honoria to the bridge. Once there, Bertie tells Honoria that a friend of his is in love with her, but is too shy to tell her. Honoria laughs. She notices Oswald, and remarks how he could easily fall off. Bertie says he will warn Oswald, walks up to Oswald, and then pushes him off the bridge. Bertie awaits Bingo's entrance, but Bingo does not appear. Finally, Bertie dives after Oswald, but Oswald swims ashore himself. Feeling defeated, Bertie swims to shore.

Honoria misunderstands the situation: she laughs at Bertie's shy method of proposing to her, and his failed attempt to impress her. Bertie is unable to correct her. Honoria entertains hopes of improving him.

After changing clothes, Bertie encounters Bingo, and demands an explanation for Bingo's absence. Bingo, however, has moved on from Honoria, because he has fallen in love with Daphne instead.

Two days later, Bertie receives a letter from Jeeves, who is enjoying his vacation.

== Publication history ==
1922 Strand illustration by A. Wallis Mills

The story was illustrated by A. Wallis Mills in the Strand, and by T. D. Skidmore in Cosmopolitan, in which the story was titled "Bertie Gets Even".

== Adaptations ==
=== Television ===
An episode of The World of Wooster adapted the story. The fifth episode of the first series, it was originally broadcast in the UK on 27 June 1965. The episode was titled "Jeeves and the Hero's Reward".

This story was adapted in the Jeeves and Wooster episode "Jeeves' Arrival", the first episode of the first series, which first aired in the UK on 22 April 1990. There are minor differences in plot, including:

- The episode takes place just after Bertie hires Jeeves; consequently, Jeeves does not go away on vacation.
- Bertie never hears a remark from Jeeves about being mentally negligible, and does not try to score off Jeeves.
- In the episode, Jeeves wants Bertie to wear a brown Harris Tweed suit to Ditteredge, but Bertie refuses. (This is a detail from the story "Jeeves Takes Charge," which the episode also adapts.)
- In the episode, Bertie does not know that Bingo is at Ditteredge and is surprised to see him there.
- In the episode, Bertie tells Jeeves about his plan to push Oswald off the bridge, though Jeeves disapproves of the plan.

=== Radio ===
This story, along with the rest of The Inimitable Jeeves, was adapted into a radio drama in 1973 as part of the series What Ho! Jeeves starring Michael Hordern as Jeeves and Richard Briers as Bertie Wooster.
