= Paul Ableman =

English playwright and novelist

- Born: 13 June 1927; Leeds, Yorkshire
- Died: 25 October 2006 (aged 79)
- Occupations: Playwright; novelist
- Spouse(s): Tina Carrs-Brown (m. 1958, divorced), Sheila Hutton-Fox (m. 1978)
- Children: 2
- Writing career
- Language: English
- Period: 1958–1994
- Genre: Erotic fiction

Paul Victor Ableman (13 June 1927 – 25 October 2006) was an English playwright and novelist. He was the writer of much erotic fiction and novelisations, and a freelance writer who turned his hand to non-fiction.

== Life and career ==
Ableman was born in Leeds, Yorkshire to a Jewish family. He was the son of Jack Ableman, a trouser cutter at a tailoring factory, and Gertrude (née Gould), an actress and writer. Following his parents' divorce, he lived with his mother and stepfather, Thurston B. Macauley, a journalist (sometime London correspondent for The New York Times) in New York. After National Service in the Education Corps based in Gibraltar, he read English at King's College, London, but did not take a degree.

His experimental novel, I Hear Voices, was published in 1958 by the Olympia Press, and his plays include Green Julia (1966), a witty two-hander in which two young men discuss an absent mistress, and Tests (1966), which collects surreal playlets written for Peter Brook's Theatre of Cruelty.

Ableman lived in Hampstead, London in the United Kingdom. He was married twice: first to Tina Carrs-Brown in 1958- they had one son, then divorced; then to Sheila Hutton-Fox in 1978 until his death in 2006- they had one son.

Ableman was of Russian ancestry on his father's side and German on his mother's side.

== Novels ==
- I Hear Voices (1958)
- As Near As I Can Get (1962)
- Vac (1968)
- The Twilight of the Vilp (1969)
- Bits: Some Prose Poems (1969, poems)
- The Mouth and Oral Sex (1969, psychology)
- Tornado Pratt (1978, novel)
- Porridge: The Inside Story (1979)
- A Killing on the Exchange (1979, novelization of his own miniseries teleplays)
- Shoestring (1979)
- Shoestring's Finest Hour (1980)
- County Hall (1982, novel)
- The Doomed Rebellion (1983)
- Hi De Hi: The Novel (1983)
- Straight Up: The Autobiography of Arthur Daley (1991)
- Waiting for God (1994)

== Plays ==
- Green Julia (1966)
- Tests (playlets) (1966)
- Blue Comedy: Madly in Love, Hawk's Night (1968)
