= The World Is Not Enough (song) =

Theme of the James Bond film The World Is Not Enough

Single by Garbage

from the album The World Is Not Enough: Music from the MGM Motion Picture
- B-side: "Ice Bandits"
- Released: November 15, 1999
- Recorded: June–August 1999
- Studio: Metropolis, London; Armoury, Vancouver
- Genre: Electronic rock; symphonic rock
- Length: 3:57
- Label: Radioactive
- Composer: David Arnold
- Lyricist: Don Black
- Producers: Garbage; David Arnold

Garbage singles chronology
"You Look So Fine" (1999)	"The World Is Not Enough" (1999)	"Androgyny" (2001)

James Bond theme singles chronology
"Tomorrow Never Dies" (1997)	"The World Is Not Enough" (1999)	"Die Another Day" (2002)

Alternate cover
- 2022 digital single cover

Audio sample
- file; help

Music video
- "The World Is Not Enough" on YouTube

"The World Is Not Enough" is the theme song for the 1999 James Bond film The World Is Not Enough, performed by American rock band Garbage. The song was written by composer David Arnold (who also scored the film) and lyricist Don Black, previously responsible for four other Bond songs, and was produced by Garbage and Arnold. "The World Is Not Enough" was composed in the style of the series' title songs, in contrast with the post-modern production and genre-hopping of Garbage's first two albums Garbage (1995) and Version 2.0 (1998). The group recorded most of "The World Is Not Enough" while on the Version 2.0 World Tour in Europe in support of their album Version 2.0, telephoning Arnold as he recorded the orchestral backing in London before travelling to England. Garbage later finished recording and mixing the song at Armoury Studios in Canada. The lyrics reflect the film's plot told from the viewpoint of antagonist Elektra King (Sophie Marceau), with themes of world domination and seduction.

The song and its accompanying soundtrack were released internationally by Radioactive Records when the film premiered worldwide at the end of November 1999. "The World Is Not Enough" was praised by reviewers; it reached the top 40 of ten singles charts and the top 10 of four. It was included on the 2008 re-release of the James Bond compilation The Best of Bond... James Bond, Garbage's 2007 greatest hits album, Absolute Garbage, and Garbage's 2022 greatest hits album Anthology.

== Development ==
=== Background ===
In September 1998 Michael G. Wilson and Barbara Broccoli, owners of Eon Productions and long-time producers of James Bond films, chose David Arnold to compose the score for the nineteenth Bond movie The World Is Not Enough (scheduled for release in November of the following year). Arnold composed the score for Tomorrow Never Dies, the previous film in 1997, and oversaw the recording of Shaken and Stirred: The David Arnold James Bond Project (an album of cover versions recorded by contemporary artists including Pulp, Aimee Mann and David McAlmont) that same year. Arnold and the film's production team wanted an early rough draft of the song so elements of its melody could be incorporated into the main score. Director Michael Apted thought the use of Carly Simon's "Nobody Does It Better" as a love theme throughout The Spy Who Loved Me very effective, and he wanted Arnold to use that as a reference point.

=== Composition ===
Arnold wanted a theme song marrying the "classic Bond sound" with the electronica that would influence most of his score. An orchestra would be required as audiences expect traditional elements in a Bond film, and without them The World Is Not Enough would be seen as a generic action movie. Getting the balance right might be a "poisoned chalice", since the results could sound too much or too little like a Bond theme. Arnold collaborated with lyricist Don Black on the song. Black, with 30 years of experience writing Bond themes, wrote the lyrics to Tom Jones's "Thunderball", Shirley Bassey's "Diamonds Are Forever", Lulu's "The Man with the Golden Gun" and k.d. lang's closing credits theme, "Surrender", from Tomorrow Never Dies. Arnold and Black met several times to discuss lyrics for "The World Is Not Enough", also collaborating by phone, fax and email. According to Arnold, he "strung some la-las together, and all of a sudden the [song] came to life". By the end of 1998 he and Black finished the music and lyrics, except for the bridge (a contrasting section of about eight bars).

The lyrics are from the viewpoint of Elektra King (Sophie Marceau), the Bond girl revealed as the mastermind of the villainous scheme. Its underlying themes are seduction and domination, described by Arnold as "a steel fist in a velvet glove. It beckons you in with its crooked finger." Black added that although the lyrics reflected the film's plot, they were "of course all about world domination" and "a lot more personal and intense", evoking a "ballady and dramatic" mood. A line of dialogue from the film, "There's no point in living if you can't feel alive," was included in the lyrics.

Part of the reason I thought Garbage would be such a good idea [for the theme song], is that I think Shirley Manson is someone who could easily inhabit Bond's world. The whole thing about the song is that it needs to entice you, and beckon you in. [...] Shirley is the only person I can think of in the world of contemporary music who is the musical equivalent of Elektra. It is as important as casting the characters – getting the right voice and right attitude for the song.

— David Arnold

By the first week of January 1999, Arnold completed the song's outline and made a synthesizer-arranged demo recording in his recording studio. He played the demo for Wilson, Broccoli and Apted, who were "extremely pleased" with the results. Arnold's agent then presented the demo to MGM executives in Los Angeles, who initially disliked it because it was a ballad and they expected a more uptempo song. MGM asked Arnold to rewrite a three-note sequence considered too similar to a motif in earlier Bond themes.

That month Arnold offered the theme to Garbage lead singer Shirley Manson, who was very enthusiastic; Arnold said he "never heard someone screaming down the phone". A week later he sent the band the rough demo, which they approved. Manson requested a small change in the lyrics, disliking the line "I know when to kiss and I know when to kill", so Arnold and Black changed "I" to "we" for the final version.

Garbage drummer and co-producer Butch Vig said that when the group contributed to film soundtracks, "one of our fantasies would be to do the Bond theme or do the new Bond song." Manson called herself a fan of the series, "an institution I admire and has always captured my imagination since I was a child", and the films had a "sensibility quite similar to how we approach making music". The chance to record a Bond theme appealed to her because "you know it's going down in movie history", and coming from Scotland, like original James Bond Sean Connery, "that's very close and inherent in our culture. It's not Bond if it's not Scottish!" The singer considered Garbage's music and the series' concepts "something that you can enjoy on the surface, but underneath there are lots of conflicting themes you can get into."

At the beginning of August Garbage's involvement was confirmed in a press release from MGM and Radioactive Records, Shirley Manson's record label, which would release the soundtrack and the single. Although Music Week reported that Jamiroquai, Robbie Williams, Sharleen Spiteri, Björk and Melanie C were rejected by the producers before Garbage was chosen, Arnold denied that the other artists had auditioned; the single was suitable only for a film, and was not created with a particular artist in mind.

=== Recording ===
Garbage recording with David Arnold at London's Metropolis Studios

The first recordings were made during the European leg of Garbage's Version 2.0 World Tour. After listening to the orchestral demo, the band worked on the key and tempo. Garbage used a portable studio from a number of European cities to record material for Arnold, keeping in touch by phone as he produced the song's string arrangement in London. Since the strings carried the structure of the song, they had to be finalised and recorded before Manson could sing her parts. Arnold recorded the strings with a 60-piece orchestra in one day at London's Metropolis Studios.

Garbage flew to London for a day to record the basic tracks, laying down electric guitar, bass guitar and Manson's vocals with the orchestra. Manson called working with the orchestra "exhilarating". That night, the band flew to Switzerland to resume their tour for three weeks.

Vocally, it's a big change for me. It requires a very wide range, and you can't hide behind any effect. Basically, it's just my voice. I was terrified, and I kept weeping to my friends, "I'm going to look a fool! There's no way I'm going to be able to carry this off!" They reassured me, saying, "No matter what happens, at least you won't come last, because you couldn't be worse than a-ha".

— Shirley Manson

The final recording was made in August at Armoury Studios in Vancouver, Canada, where Garbage built upon their first mix of the song, adding and subtracting parts, and completed final recording and mixing. The band kept the arrangement tight to preserve the song's dynamic, sweeping melody. "The orchestra took up so much space and really dictated where the song was going dynamically," keeping the recording simple, Vig recalled. "Besides the drums and bass and some percussive loops, there's a little bit of guitar that Duke and Steve did. There's not a lot of miscellaneous tracks on there. There's a few little ear-candy things that we did, but it's all meant to work around Shirley's singing." Although Garbage owned its own recording studio Smart Studios in Madison, Wisconsin, for legal reasons the song could not be recorded in a U.S. studio. "The World Is Not Enough" was completed, mixed and mastered at the end of the month, and the group returned to their recording studio in Madison to record their mix of the song. Garbage's version (the "chilled-out remix") downplayed the classic Bond sound in favor of the band's style. Vig later said about the original recording, "We're pretty pleased with how it turned out. To Garbage fans, it sounds like a Garbage song. And to Bond fans, it's a Bond song." However, Manson noted that the version featured in the film "got our hopes and joys squashed," as "they had completely screwed with all the stems of mix and it sounded completely different."

=== Copyright infringement case ===
Two songwriters, Frank P. Fogerty and Nathan Crow, sued Eon, MGM, Universal Music and Universal Studios for copyright infringement over "The World Is Not Enough", alleging that it derived from their song "This Game We Play", which was submitted to MGM executives in February 1999 for consideration for the soundtrack of The Thomas Crown Affair. Their claim centered on a four-note sequence in "The World Is Not Enough" which they alleged was identical to part of "This Game We Play". When the songwriters were gathering evidence, one posed as an employee of composer James Horner to contact Don Black and solicit his services for the 2001 film Ocean's Eleven. They recorded their conversation with Black, trying to get him to disclose when he and Arnold composed "The World Is Not Enough", and contacted Shirley Manson in a similar manner.

The case was argued in the United States District Court for the Middle District of Tennessee in June 2004. The court rejected the plaintiffs' claim, concluding that Arnold independently composed "The World Is Not Enough" and it did not share a passage with "This Game We Play". The plaintiffs conceded that Arnold did not have access to "This Game We Play" after journal entries, delivery invoices, telephone and computer records, written declarations from Michael G. Wilson and Barbara Broccoli and testimony from David Arnold, Don Black, Shirley Manson and Arnold's personal assistant provided "irrefutable evidence" that "The World Is Not Enough" had already been written and was not changed significantly—other than a lyrical alteration (the removal of one line to accommodate Shirley Manson) and an amendment to the score (the removal of the "three-note motif" to accommodate the MGM executives)—from the date that "This Game We Play" was submitted to MGM.

== Music video ==
Terrorists plant a bomb in the torso of the Shirley Manson android

The music video for "The World Is Not Enough" was directed by Philipp Stölzl for Oil Factory Films and filmed at Black Island Studios in London from September 23–24, 1999. Manson's android shots (the laboratory, kissing and driving scenes) were filmed on the first day, with the pyrotechnic scenes shot on the second. For her "death", Manson kissed a lookalike model. The University of London's Senate House was the exterior for the fictional New Globe Theatre in Chicago. Post-production and editing were completed two weeks later.

In the video (set in 1964) terrorists build an android replica of Shirley Manson, who can kill her targets with a kiss, on an unnamed Pacific island. The android is fitted with a bomb, primed before it leaves on its mission. The android makes its way to Chicago's (fictional) New Globe Theater and lets itself into Shirley Manson's dressing room, killing Manson and assuming her identity to perform the coda of a song on a large steel globe. As the android and the band receive a standing ovation from the audience, the bomb counts down. Smiling, the android Manson thrusts its arms in the air; the screen blacks out as the timer reaches zero, and an explosion is heard.

The Manson android performs onstage with Garbage before exploding at the climax of "The World Is Not Enough"

Stölzl (chosen by Garbage) drew up a treatment liked by the band, but MGM and Eon (who commissioned the video) did not consider it "Bond enough". Stölzl's reworked storyboard featured Manson as an android clone who kills her human counterpart, a concept the band also liked. He provided a special-effects company with sketches of the android, and a replica was constructed with aircraft and missile parts, tubing, metal and plastic. The android was combined with Manson in post-production to show its mechanical interior. "It reminds me of The Man Who Knew Too Much. Some of the shots look like Stanley Kubrick", recalled Vig. "For us it was just important that the music video was also a Garbage video." "[It's] like a mini-Bond action-packed film, where an android removes evil from the world and sacrifices herself in the process like a kamikaze warrior. That's as close as we'll ever get [to being in a Bond movie]," Manson later said.

The video's filming was documented by a Making the Video camera crew, and premiered on MTV after the program on October 20, 1999; it debuted in the United Kingdom and on Total Request Live the following day. A version of the video featuring footage from the film was shown in some countries; to preserve the video's narrative, the film footage appeared on a split screen. "The World Is Not Enough" video was included on the film's 2000 DVD release and Garbage's 2007 greatest-hits DVD compilation, Absolute Garbage.

== Release and reception ==
=== Single release ===
In North America, Radioactive distributed both versions of "The World Is Not Enough" to AAA, alternative, modern adult and modern rock radio stations on October 4, 1999. Originally planned for introduction a week later, the radio date was moved up when a Los Angeles station broadcast a ripped, low-quality MP3 of the Chilled Out remix circulated on file-sharing networks early. The single's release coincided with Garbage's return to North America to headline an MTV-sponsored Campus Invasion Tour. The band introduced "The World Is Not Enough" on October 20 during a concert at the University of Denver. On November 1, Garbage performed the song live on the Late Show with David Letterman.

Radioactive released "The World Is Not Enough" in the United Kingdom on November 15, 1999, as a limited-edition digipak CD single and a cassette single. Both formats were backed with "Ice Bandits", an orchestral track from the David Arnold film score. The CD also included a remix produced by trip hop act Unkle. After one week, "The World Is Not Enough" debuted at number 11 on the UK Singles Chart, Garbage's 10th top-40 single. It remained on the UK chart for nine weeks. In Ireland, "The World Is Not Enough" peaked at number 30.

The song's music video was aired before the November 11 worldwide live broadcast of the MTV Europe Music Awards. MTV heavily promoted the film during the awards, giving away a BMW Z8 (Bond (Pierce Brosnan)'s car in the film and Shirley Manson's in the video). Radioactive released the single in Europe from November 15 as a three-track CD digipak and a two-track card-sleeve single, backed with "Ice Bandits".

In late November 1999, "The World Is Not Enough" debuted at number three in Iceland, reaching number one the following week. It debuted at number 54 in Sweden at number seven in Norway, and number 10 in Finland, where it peaked at number seven in its second week. In the Netherlands the single debuted at number 74, rising to number 48 two weeks later. It debuted at number 55 in France and number 12 in Belgium's Wallonia. In December the song debuted at number 40 in Austria, remaining there for four weeks. It debuted at number 22 in Switzerland, rising to number 16 four weeks later at the beginning of January 2000. At the end of December, the song debuted at number 18 in Italy before peaking at number six in February 2000. Also in December, "The World Is Not Enough" peaked at number 38 in Germany and number 12 in Spain.

Radioactive followed the single with The World Is Not Enough's soundtrack album, featuring "Ice Bandits" and "Only Myself to Blame" (a second David Arnold-Don Black composition, sung by Scott Walker during the end credits). The album was released in North America on November 9, and then internationally. "The World Is Not Enough" was included as a bonus track on the Japanese version of Garbage's 2001 third album, Beautiful Garbage, and was remastered for Absolute Garbage. It was also included in three editions of the James Bond music compilation The Best of Bond... James Bond: in 2002, 2008, 2012 and 2018.

In 2022, "The World Is Not Enough" was remastered by Heba Kadry for inclusion in Garbage's third best of compilation Anthology, released on October 28. The 2022 remaster was released as digital single with new artwork on YouTube Music on September 13, on Amazon Music and Apple Music on September 22, and on Spotify the following day. On October 4, Garbage performed "The World Is Not Enough" at the Royal Albert Hall in London with the Royal Philharmonic Orchestra as part of The Sound of 007: Live at the Royal Albert Hall curated by David Arnold, marking the 60th anniversary of the Bond franchise. The event was made available for streaming on Prime Video on October 5. A documentary by Matt Whitecross titled The Sound of 007 featuring an interview with Garbage premiered on Prime Video the same day.

=== Critical reception ===
"The World Is Not Enough" received mainly positive reviews from music critics. Kerrang! magazine noted that "Nothing takes a band into the truly immortal like a Bond theme, and Garbage's ever-burgeoning celebrity will be done no harm whatsoever by this appropriately lush and orchestral anthem." A Radio Times reviewer wrote that the song "sounds like Shirley Bassey revisited", while AllMusic's Stephen Thomas Erlewine wrote that Garbage "expertly modernized the classic Bond sound, while turning in a strong melodic tune. A first class theme song". PopMatters called the song a "top-notch Bond theme", following the Shirley Bassey template. In a Billboard review, Chuck Taylor wrote that Garbage was an inspired choice and the song "rings of international intrigue, with the slinky gait, noir-ish guitar line and grand chorus we have come to expect ... the song's darkly sexy, electronic ambience is wholly in keeping with Garbage's distinctive soundprint. [It is] not only the best 007 theme in eons, it is a great Garbage track that should thrill fans of band and Bond alike". IGN ranked "The World Is Not Enough" ninth on its list of top 10 James Bond songs, stating, "Shirley Manson's warbling croon is a perfect fit for an opening sequence and her bandmates gel well with Arnold's sweeping symphonics."

Negative reviews revolved around the theme's classic Bond sound. LAUNCHcast's James Poletti called the song a "perfectly competent Bond theme", but "the formula seems a little too easy. Perhaps they would have done better to rise to the challenge of doing something a little different, something a little more knowingly tongue-in-cheek." Melody Maker stated, "You know what this sounds like before you hear it. If the people in charge want Garbage, then why not let them do what Garbage do?" In its review of Absolute Garbage, Pitchfork called the song a "predictable "Goldfinger" permutation signaling the band's limitless affinity for big-budget theatrics."

The song appeared in two "best of 1999" radio-station polls: number 87 in 89X's Top 89 Songs of 1999 and number 100 in Q101's Top 101 of 1999. In 2012 Grantland ranked "The World Is Not Enough" the second-best Bond song of all time, behind "Goldfinger".

=== Cover versions ===
In 2002, "The World Is Not Enough" was covered by Canadian singer Diana Krall for The Songs of Bond, a UK television special. Also in 2002, the song was covered by Turkish singer Rafet El Roman, for his second album 5 Nr Aşk as "Yıllar Sonra". The song was rearranged with Turkish lyrics and tempo of song was increased. Four years later Turkish folk musician Müslüm Gürses covered the song on his album Aşk Tesadüfleri Sever (Love Loves Coincidences). The song was re-arranged with Turkish lyrics and re-titled "Bir Ömür Yetmez (A Life Is Not Enough)".

In 2017, Chris Collingwood, lead singer of Fountains of Wayne, recorded the song with his new band, Look Park, for the multi-artist compilation album Songs, Bond Songs: The Music of 007.

In 2022, the song was covered by Belgian-Egyptian artist Tamino for the French TV show Reprise.

- 2025 - John Greene, Sunburn for the Soul

== Track listings ==
- UK CD single Radioactive RAXTD-40
- European CD maxi Radioactive 155 672-2
1. "The World Is Not Enough" – 3:57
2. "The World Is Not Enough – U.N.K.L.E. Remix" – 5:13
3. "Ice Bandits" – 3:42

- UK cassette single Radioactive RAXC-40
- European CD single Radioactive 155 675-2
1. "The World Is Not Enough" – 3:57
2. "Ice Bandits" – 3:42

== Credits and personnel ==
- Music: David Arnold
- Lyrics: Don Black
- Produced: Garbage & David Arnold
- Performed & mixed: Garbage
  - Vocals: Shirley Manson
  - Guitar: Steve Marker, Duke Erikson
  - Bass: Duke Erikson
  - Drums: Butch Vig

- Audio engineering: Billy Bush
- Assistant Engineer (UK): Matt Lawrence
- Assistant Engineer (Canada): Paul Forgues
- Additional Bass: Daniel Shulman
- Recorded at Metropolis Studios in London, UK and Armoury Studios, Vancouver, Canada.
- Mastering : Scott Hull (Classic Sound, New York)

== Charts ==
=== Weekly charts ===
Weekly chart performance for "The World Is Not Enough"
Chart (1999–2000)	Peak position
Austria (Ö3 Austria Top 40)	40
Belgium (Ultratip Bubbling Under Flanders)	7
Belgium (Ultratop 50 Wallonia)	12
Europe (European Hot 100 Singles)	40
Finland (Suomen virallinen lista)	7
France (SNEP)	55
Germany (GfK)	38
Greece (IFPI)	10
Iceland (Íslenski Listinn Topp 40)	1
Ireland (IRMA)	30
Italy (Musica e dischi)	6
Netherlands (Dutch Top 40 Tipparade)	2
Netherlands (Single Top 100)	48
Norway (VG-lista)	7
Scottish Singles Sales (Official Charts)	12
Spain (AFYVE)	12
Sweden (Sverigetopplistan)	54
Switzerland (Schweizer Hitparade)	16
UK Singles (Official Charts)	11

=== Year-end charts ===
Year-end chart performance for "The World Is Not Enough"
Chart (2000)	Position
Iceland (Íslenski Listinn Topp 40)	53

== Release history ==
Release dates and formats for "The World Is Not Enough"
Region	Date	Format(s)	Label	Ref(s).
United States	October 4, 1999	AAA; alternative; modern adult; modern rock radio	Radioactive	
United Kingdom	November 15, 1999	CD single; cassette single	Radioactive	
Europe	November 15, 1999	CD single; CD maxi	Radioactive	

== See also ==
- Outline of James Bond
