= Sir Roderick Comes to Lunch =

- Short story by P. G. Wodehouse
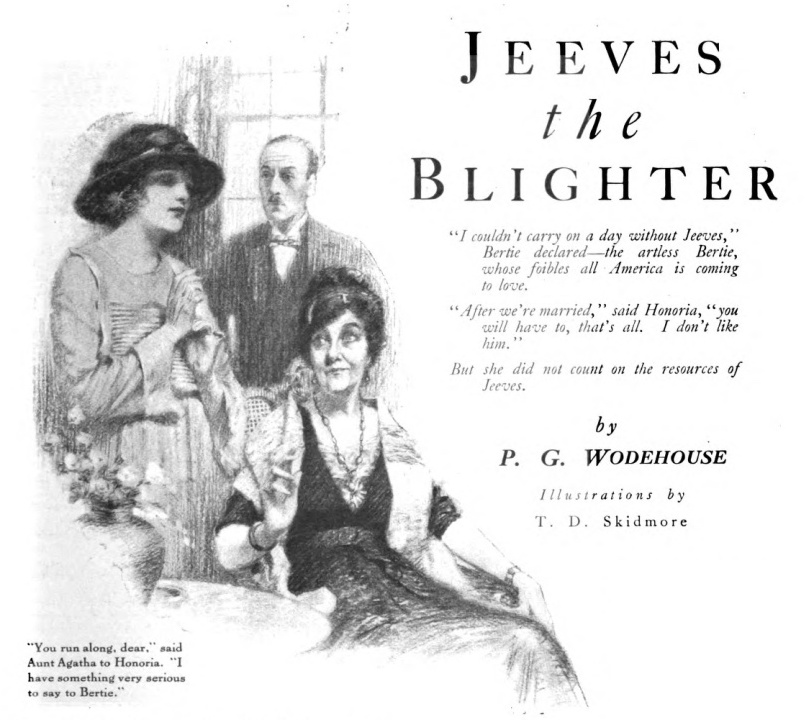
- 1922 Cosmopolitan title illustration by T. D. Skidmore
- Country: United Kingdom
- Language: English
- Genre: Comedy

Publication
- Publisher: The Strand Magazine (UK); Cosmopolitan (US)
- Media type: Print (Magazine)
- Publication date: March 1922 (UK); April 1922 (US)

Chronology
- Series: Jeeves
Scoring off Jeeves	Jeeves and the Chump Cyril

"Sir Roderick Comes to Lunch" (also published as "Jeeves the Blighter") is a short story by P. G. Wodehouse, and features the young gentleman Bertie Wooster and his valet Jeeves. The story was published in The Strand Magazine in London in March 1922, and then in Cosmopolitan in New York in April 1922. The story was also included in the 1923 collection The Inimitable Jeeves as two separate chapters, "Introducing Claude and Eustace" and "Sir Roderick Comes to Lunch".

In the story, Bertie is told by his Aunt Agatha that he must demonstrate to Sir Roderick Glossop that he is mentally sound, and Bertie's cousins Claude and Eustace want to get into a club called The Seekers.

== Plot ==
=== Introducing Claude and Eustace ===
Bertie has been unhappily engaged for two weeks to Honoria Glossop. He lunches with Honoria, and with his approving Aunt Agatha. Honoria dislikes Jeeves and tells Bertie to get rid of him. Bertie tries to object, but Aunt Agatha agrees.

After Honoria leaves, Aunt Agatha tells Bertie that Honoria's father, Sir Roderick Glossop, a so-called nerve specialist and a serious-minded man, wants to verify that Bertie is psychologically normal; therefore, Bertie must give Sir Roderick lunch the next day and behave well. Off-handedly, Aunt Agatha adds that Bertie's cousins, the twins Claude and Eustace, hope to be elected soon to a college club called The Seekers.

The next day, Bertie walks in the park, where he is greeted by Eustace, Claude, and their friend "Dog-Face", Lord Rainsby. Bertie realizes he is late for lunch with Sir Roderick and returns home to find that Sir Roderick has not yet arrived and Jeeves has prepared the lunch. The bell rings.

=== Sir Roderick Comes to Lunch ===
"Oh, Jeeves," I said, "Cats! What about it? Are there any cats in the flat?"
"Only the three in your bedroom, sir."
"What!"
"Cats in his bedroom!" I heard Sir Roderick whisper in a kind of stricken way, and his eyes hit me amidships like a couple of bullets.

— Bertie asks Jeeves about the cat noises

Bertie and Sir Roderick eat lunch. Sir Roderick, who detests cats, hears a cat nearby. He complains that a hat was stolen from him earlier, then hears a cat again. Bertie rings for Jeeves to come and explain the noise. Jeeves answers that there are three cats in Bertie's bedroom, and they are noisy because they found the fish being kept under the bed. Sir Roderick is shocked, and moves to leave. When Bertie offers to follow Sir Roderick, Jeeves hands Bertie a hat, which is too big for him; it is Sir Roderick's stolen hat. Aghast, Sir Roderick takes the hat and exits, asking Jeeves to follow and tell him more about Bertie. The cats run out and leave.

Lord Rainsby appears next, and explains that, in order to be elected into The Seekers, one has to steal something. He stole the cats, Eustace the fish, and Claude the hat. Jeeves had permitted them to store these in Bertie's flat. This upsets Bertie. Lord Rainsby, disappointed that these things are gone, asks for ten pounds to bail out Claude and Eustace, after they tried to steal a lorry. Bertie gives him money and he leaves.

Jeeves returns, and says his remarks to Sir Roderick have likely made Sir Roderick question Bertie's sanity. Then, Aunt Agatha calls; Jeeves tells her Mr. Wooster is not in, and the call ends. Jeeves infers from her agitation that Sir Roderick has called off Bertie's engagement to Honoria. Bertie realizes that Jeeves has saved him. To avoid Aunt Agatha's ire, Jeeves suggests they take a trip to the south of France (this is changed to New York in The Inimitable Jeeves), and Bertie approves.

== Publication history ==
1922 Strand illustration by A. Wallis Mills

The ending of the story varies slightly between versions. In the original newspaper publications and in the collection The Jeeves Omnibus, when Bertie and Jeeves are fleeing Aunt Agatha's wrath, they go to the south of France; this leads into the events of "Aunt Agatha Takes the Count" during which Aunt Agatha follows Bertie to a hotel in France to scold him on his failure to marry Honoria. In The Inimitable Jeeves, the story ends with Bertie and Jeeves fleeing to New York instead; this is followed by the events of "Jeeves and the Chump Cyril", which is set in New York.

This story was illustrated by A. Wallis Mills in the Strand, and by T. D. Skidmore in Cosmopolitan. "Sir Roderick Comes to Lunch" was included in the collection Nothing But Wodehouse, published by Doubleday in 1932, and also in a collection of animal-related Wodehouse stories, A Wodehouse Bestiary, published by Ticknor & Fields in 1985.

== Adaptations ==
=== Television ===
The only surviving episode of The World of Wooster was adapted from both this story and "The Delayed Exit of Claude and Eustace". The episode, titled "Jeeves and the Delayed Exit of Claude and Eustace", was adapted by Richard Waring and was originally broadcast on 4 January 1966.

This story was adapted into part of the Jeeves and Wooster episode "Jeeves' Arrival", the first episode of the first series, which first aired in the UK on 22 April 1990. There are some differences in plot, including:

- Unlike in the original story, there is no mention in the episode of Sir Roderick Glossop having concerns about Bertie because of what he has heard about Bertie's late Uncle Henry.
- In the episode, Sir Roderick Glossop is accompanied to the lunch by Lady Glossop, though she is not mentioned in the original story.
- In the episode, Honoria does not say anything about firing Jeeves.
- In the episode, Claude and Eustace try to steal a bus.
- Unlike in the original story, in the episode Jeeves does not say anything to Glossop outside the flat to make him doubt Bertie's sanity.

=== Radio ===
This story, along with the rest of The Inimitable Jeeves, was adapted into a radio drama in 1973 as part of the series What Ho! Jeeves starring Michael Hordern as Jeeves and Richard Briers as Bertie Wooster.
