= Aunt Agatha Takes the Count =

- Short story by P. G. Wodehouse
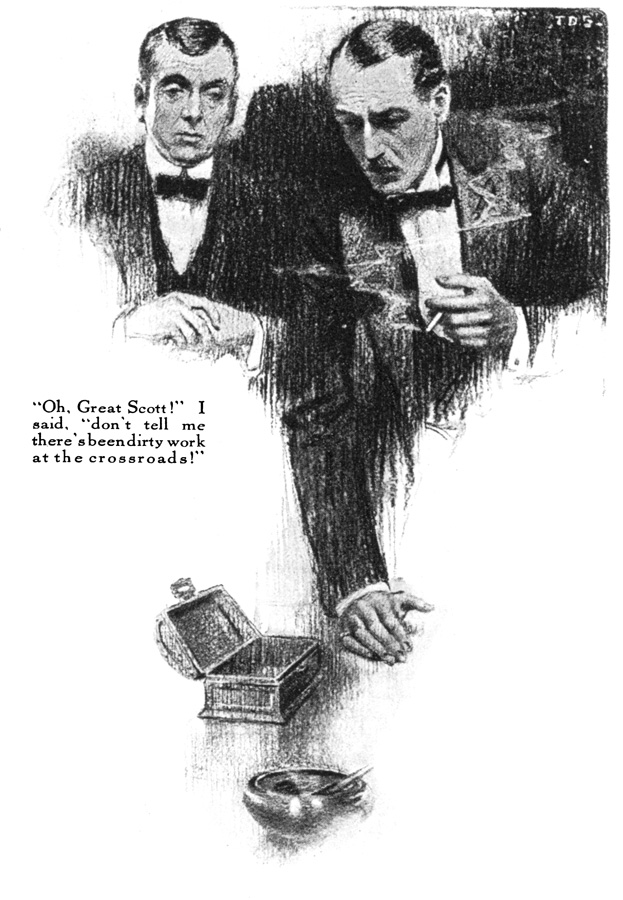
- 1922 Cosmopolitan illustration by T. D. Skidmore
- Illustrator: A. Wallis Mills
- Country: United Kingdom
- Language: English
- Genre: Comedy

Publication
- Publisher: The Strand Magazine (UK); Cosmopolitan (US)
- Media type: Print (Magazine)
- Publication date: April 1922 (UK); October 1922 (US)

Chronology
- Series: Jeeves
Jeeves in the Springtime	Scoring off Jeeves

"Aunt Agatha Takes the Count" (also published as "Aunt Agatha Makes a Bloomer") is a short story by P. G. Wodehouse, and features the young gentleman Bertie Wooster and his valet Jeeves. The story was published in The Strand Magazine in London in April 1922, and then in Cosmopolitan in New York in October 1922. The story was also included in the 1923 collection The Inimitable Jeeves as two separate chapters, "Aunt Agatha Speaks Her Mind" and "Pearls Mean Tears".

In the story, Bertie's overbearing Aunt Agatha tries to get Bertie engaged to the respectable and dull Aline Hemmingway.

== Plot ==
=== Aunt Agatha Speaks Her Mind ===
Bertie receives a letter from his aunt, Agatha Gregson, bidding him to join her at Roville-sur-mer, a French resort. Bertie, who cannot disobey his intimidating Aunt Agatha, consoles himself with the hope of wearing a bright scarlet cummerbund he bought.

At the resort, Bertie meets Aunt Agatha, who scolds Bertie for wasting his life and not being married. She has found a suitable match for him: Aline Hemmingway. Aline then appears, along with her brother Sidney, a curate. Aunt Agatha introduces them to Bertie, who finds them dull.

I went straight back to my room, dug out the cummerbund, and draped it round the old tum. I turned round and Jeeves shied like a startled mustang.
"I beg your pardon, sir," he said in a sort of hushed voice. "You are surely not proposing to appear in public in that thing?"

— Jeeves disapproves of the cummerbund

In his room, Bertie cheers himself up by wearing his scarlet cummerbund. Jeeves disapproves of the cummerbund, but Bertie wears it anyway. Later, Bertie takes the unpleasant Hemmingways for a drive. Afterwards, he asks Jeeves for help in escaping marriage to Aline, but Jeeves continues to disapprove of the cummerbund and gives no advice.

=== Pearls Mean Tears ===
Bertie tries to avoid the Hemmingways, but Aline and Sidney come to see him. Sidney, distraught, confesses that he has gambled away the loan he received from a sympathetic parishioner, whom Sidney repaid with a cheque. When the cheque is not honoured by his bank, Sidney will be ruined. Aline begs Bertie for a loan. Bertie gladly agrees, but then Aline also insists that Bertie take her pearl necklace as security. Though Bertie is reluctant, he gives them the money, and a receipt, in exchange for the case of the pearl necklace. The Hemmingways thank Bertie and leave.

After Jeeves mildly reproaches Bertie's rashness, Bertie discovers that the necklace case is empty. Jeeves tells Bertie about a former employer who once gave a loan, with a pearl necklace as security, to a con man named Soapy Sid and his female accomplice. Soapy Sid swapped the case of pearls for an empty one, and used the receipt to demand reimbursement. Jeeves confirms that Sidney is Soapy Sid. Fortunately, Jeeves surreptitiously retrieved the case of pearls while helping Sidney with his jacket. Jeeves suggests that Bertie return the necklace to its owner, Aunt Agatha, and to make it clear to her that Aline was one of the thieves.

Bertie takes the necklace with him to Aunt Agatha's suite, where she is yelling at the hotel manager and accusing the chambermaid of stealing her necklace. Triumphantly, Bertie produces her pearls and rebukes her for mistreating him as well as the hotel staff. Later, Bertie gratefully gives Jeeves twenty pounds. He says that he will never wear the cummerbund again. Jeeves thanks him.

== Publication history ==
1922 Strand illustration by A. Wallis Mills

In the original version of the story, Bertie goes to the hotel in France in an unsuccessful attempt to avoid his Aunt Agatha. At the hotel, he falls in love with Aline Hemmingway on his own accord, only to be disillusioned later by her thievery. This was later altered when included in The Inimitable Jeeves.

A. Wallis Mills provided illustrations for the story in the Strand. T. D. Skidmore illustrated the story for Cosmopolitan, in which the story was titled "Aunt Agatha Makes a Bloomer". The story was included in the 1981 collection Wodehouse on Crime, which featured crime-related stories by Wodehouse and was published by Ticknor & Fields. A collection containing clergy-related Wodehouse stories, The World of Wodehouse Clergy, also included this story. This collection was published in 1984 by Hutchinson.

"Aunt Agatha Speaks Her Mind" was included in the 1948 anthology The Bedside Book of Humor: Many of the World's Funniest Stories, Poems, Skits and Cartoons, published by Peoples Book Club, and in the 1955 anthology A Treasury of Humor and Toastmaster's Handbook, published by Grolier.

== Adaptations ==
=== Television ===
The story was adapted into part of the Jeeves and Wooster episode "Pearls Mean Tears", the third episode of the second series, which aired on 28 April 1991. Minor plot differences include:

- There is no mention of a cummerbund in the episode.
- Instead of being in his room when the Hemmingways first approach him for a loan, in the episode Bertie is on the beach, having been buried up to his neck in the sand by Jeeves.
- In the episode, Jeeves arranges for the Hemmingways to be caught by the police, who are called in by Aunt Agatha.
- In the episode, Aline is revealed to actually be married to Sidney, and Jeeves had never seen either of them before. Jeeves only begins to suspect them when he sees Sidney selling tips at the racecourse.

=== Radio ===
This story, along with the rest of The Inimitable Jeeves, was adapted into a radio drama in 1973 as part of the series What Ho! Jeeves starring Michael Hordern as Jeeves and Richard Briers as Bertie Wooster.
