= The World Is Not Enough (Nintendo 64 video game) =

Nintendo 64 video game

- Developer: Eurocom Entertainment Software
- Publisher: Electronic Arts
- Designers: Bill Beacham; Kev Harvey; Aaron Jenkins
- Programmers: Robert Watkins; Mark Duffill; Simon Mills
- Composer: Neil Baldwin
- Series: James Bond
- Platform: Nintendo 64
- Release: NA: October 17, 2000; EU: December 8, 2000
- Genre: First-person shooter
- Modes: Single-player, multiplayer

The World Is Not Enough is a 2000 first-person shooter video game developed by Eurocom and published by Electronic Arts. It is based on the 1999 film of the same name. It was released for the Nintendo 64 in North America on October 17, 2000 and in Europe on December 8, 2000. The game was also released for the PlayStation in November. The game features a single-player campaign in which players assume the role of secret agent James Bond as he fights to stop a terrorist from triggering a nuclear meltdown in the waters of Istanbul. It includes a split-screen multiplayer mode where up to four players can compete in different types of deathmatch and objective-based games.

The game runs on an engine that was adapted to take advantage of the Nintendo 64 strengths. Although Eurocom used original production material to recreate the environments of the film, the company added elements to help the game design, including a mission that takes place in the London Underground. The game supports the Nintendo 64 Expansion Pak, which provides enhanced graphics and visual effects. A Controller Pak is required to save the player's progress through the game.

The World Is Not Enough received generally positive reviews from critics and was frequently compared to Rare's Nintendo 64 first-person shooters GoldenEye 007 and Perfect Dark. It was considered superior to its PlayStation counterpart because of its level design and inclusion of a multiplayer mode. Critics generally praised the game's graphics and smooth frame rate with many critics lauding it as one of the console's most technically impressive titles, but criticized its weak and inconsistent enemy artificial intelligence. In the United States, the game sold more than one million copies.

== Gameplay ==
Combat takes place in real-time and from a first-person perspective. The green and blue bars at the top left corner represent the player's health and armor levels respectively. Ammunition information is displayed at the bottom right corner.

The World Is Not Enough is a first-person shooter based on MGM's 1999 James Bond film of the same name, where the player assumes the role of James Bond through 14 missions with three difficulty settings. The player can run, jump, crouch, swim, and dive underwater for a short period. One mission is played as a rail shooter in which the player skis down a mountain. In each mission, the player must complete many objectives while encountering enemies controlled by the game's artificial intelligence. Objectives range from rescuing hostages to destroying vehicles and collecting items. Some objectives require the player to use numerous high-tech gadgets. For example, the Keypad Decrypter can be used to decode lock systems, while the ID scanner is useful to copy fingerprints.

Mission objectives vary in quantity and length depending on the difficulty setting chosen. Difficulty settings affect enemy accuracy and damage, and the availability of the game's optional automatic aiming assistance. The player can use several weapons, including pistols, submachine guns, assault rifles, a shotgun, a sniper rifle, a grenade launcher, and rocket launchers. Weapons must be reloaded after a certain number of shots and have alternate fire modes. For example, the Wolfram P2K can be used with or without a silencer. In addition, the player always carries a wristwatch which may be used to stun enemies, fire tranquilizer darts, throw a grappling hook, or emit a laser beam to open locks. In some missions, the player can use night vision or X-ray vision glasses to outsmart enemies. The player has a certain amount of health which decreases when attacked and hit by enemies. There are no health-recovery items, although body armors can be acquired to provide a secondary health bar. A Nintendo 64 Controller Pak is required to save the player's progress through the game.

In addition to the single-player missions, The World Is Not Enough features a multiplayer mode where up to four players can compete against each other in different game types, ranging from the traditional deathmatch to objective-based games such as capture the flag or king of the hill. Other game types include Last Agent Standing, where players begin the game with a finite number of lives and must survive until the opposing players exhaust their lives, and Uplink, in which players must find and touch uplink units scattered in key locations of the map to score points. Multiplayer games can be played on 14 different maps and can include bots. Bots' appearances and amount of health can be changed to match player preference.

== Plot ==
The game's plot closely follows that of the film. MI6 agent James Bond is sent to Spain to meet a banker and retrieve money for Robert King, a friend of M who purchased a classified report from the Russian Atomic Energy Department. The report, which was taken from a dead MI6 agent, is believed to contain information about terrorists who have attacked King's oil pipeline in Kazakhstan. Bond asks the banker who killed the MI6 agent, but the banker is killed by an assassin. Bond escapes with the money and takes it to the MI6 headquarters in London. A terrorist group launches an attack on the MI6 headquarters, prompting Bond to pursue the assassin through a London Underground station. Bond offers her protection, but she ultimately kills herself by exploding a hot air balloon. MI6 traces the recovered money to a KGB agent-turned-terrorist known as Renard, who previously kidnapped King's daughter, Elektra. M assigns Bond to protect Elektra, who is about to oversee the construction of an oil pipeline in Azerbaijan.

During a tour of the pipeline's proposed route in the mountains, Bond and Elektra are attacked by a hit squad in armed, paraglider-equipped snowmobiles. Bond suspects the attack was caused by Elektra's head of security, Davidov, and decides to kill him before taking his place on a flight to a Russian ICBM base in Kazakhstan. There, Bond meets nuclear physicist Christmas Jones and learns that Renard managed to steal plutonium from a nuclear warhead. To get a lead on where Renard might be hiding, Bond visits a former Russian mafia adversary, Valentin Zukovsky, who reveals that Elektra was in exchange for the use of a submarine being captained by his nephew. Jones realises that if Renard were to insert the stolen plutonium into the submarine's nuclear reactor, the resulting nuclear explosion would destroy Istanbul, sabotaging the Russians' oil pipeline in the Bosporus. In Istanbul, Bond and Jones are captured by Elektra's henchmen. Jones is taken aboard the submarine, while Bond is taken to the Maiden's Tower. With the help of Zukovsky, Bond kills Elektra and boards the submarine. Ultimately, Bond finds Renard in the submarine's reactor and kills him before escaping with Jones.

== Development ==
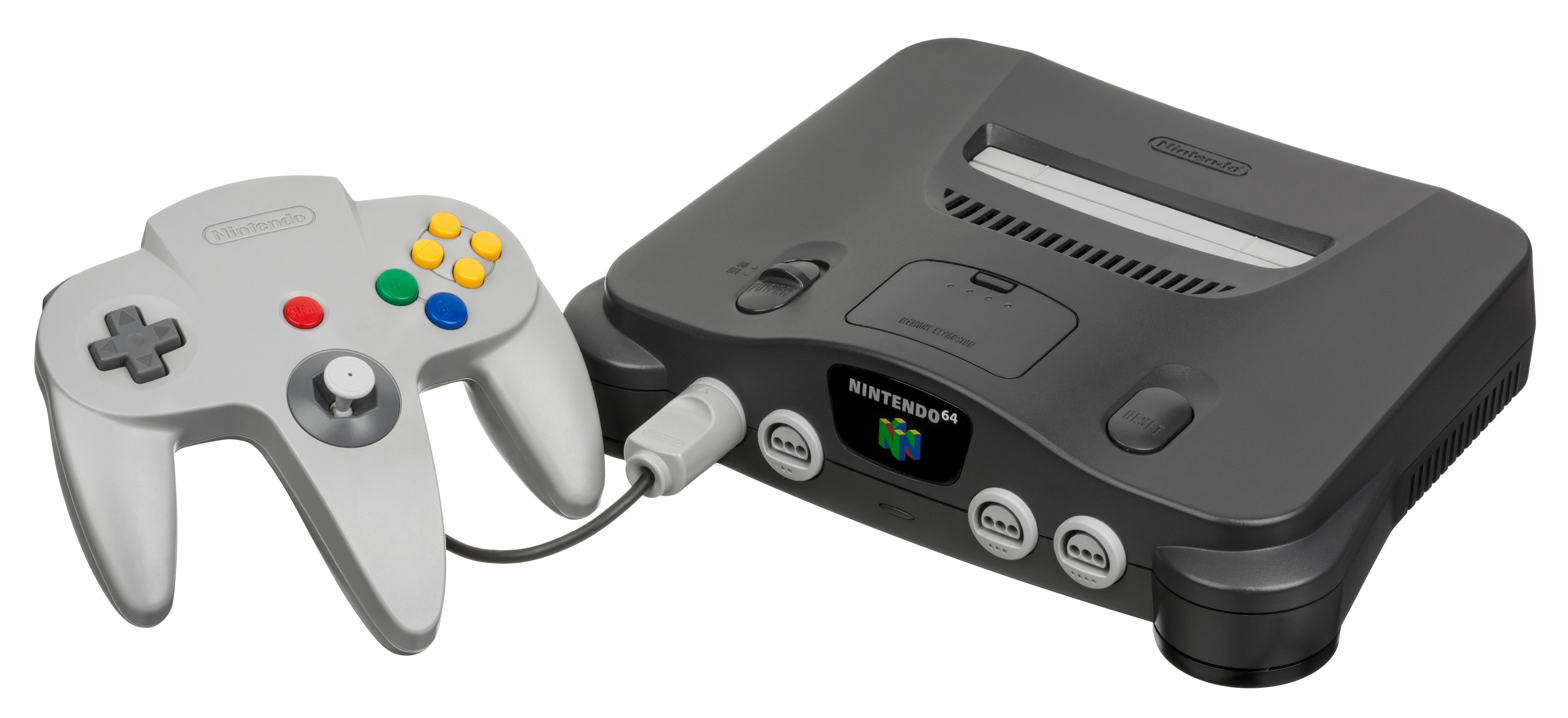
The World Is Not Enough runs on an engine that takes advantage of the Nintendo 64 strengths.

The World Is Not Enough was developed by Eurocom and published by Electronic Arts, which had formed a partnership with MGM in late 1998 to produce games based on MGM's intellectual properties. At the time, Eurocom had started development on a "very scalable" first-person 3D engine intended for sixth generation platforms like the GameCube. After Electronic Arts acquired the James Bond game licence, Eurocom showed them their engine and soon both companies started working together to produce the next Bond-licensed game. This happened when Eurocom was still working on the Nintendo 64 version of Mortal Kombat 4.

The engine was created and adapted to take advantage of the Nintendo 64 strengths. It is capable of delivering a fast and smooth frame rate while offering particle explosions, dynamic lighting effects, long draw distances, and other environmental effects like fog or smoke. It also supports the Nintendo 64 Expansion Pak, which provides enhanced graphics and visual effects. Focusing on the game's frame rate and technical aspects was a major priority because developers wanted The World Is Not Enough to be the fastest first-person game on the Nintendo 64 system. According to Eurocom, "[we] don't think we could push it much more than we have". In addition, with The World Is Not Enough being Eurocom's last Nintendo 64 game, the company saw it as "a nice swan song to go out on."

To help Eurocom authentically recreate the environments of the film, the filmmakers provided Eurocom with original production material, including concept drawings, blueprints, and photographs of the film's sets. Although the game closely follows the plot of the film, the developers added elements to help the game design. For example, the London Underground level, where the player must rescue several hostages, is not part of the film. However, the boat chase scene is not playable in the game due to limitations in the Nintendo 64 cartridge size. According to the game's producer Bill Beacham, vehicle-based gameplay would require the creation of a separate engine that would possibly compromise the game's base first-person engine. The characters' faces were digitised from the film's actors, but impersonators provided voiced dialogue. One exception was English actor John Cleese, who reprised his role as R.

Electronic Arts secured a "Teen" rating from the ESRB to avoid intense portrayals of violence because they felt that fast action and memorable spy moments were what the Bond legacy had always stood for. In May 2000, the game was presented at the Electronic Entertainment Expo in Los Angeles. At the time, development of the game was nearly 75% complete. The game was released on a 32MB cartridge and includes over 500 lines of speech, which was compressed using Factor 5's technology. The game was initially intended to be released on November 20, 2000, in North America, but was ultimately released one month earlier on October 17, 2000, because Eurocom managed to finish work on the game quicker than expected. In Europe, the game was released on December 8, 2000. A different game, also titled The World Is Not Enough, was released for the PlayStation in November 2000.

== Reception ==
Reception

Aggregate score
Aggregator	Score
Metacritic	81/100

Review scores
Publication	Score
AllGame	4.5/5
Edge	7/10
GamePro	4.5/5
GameRevolution	B
GameSpot	7.4/10
GameZone	8/10
IGN	8.9/10
N64 Magazine	88%
Next Generation	3/5
Nintendo Power	8.1/10

The World Is Not Enough received generally positive reviews from critics, who frequently compared it to Rare's critically acclaimed Nintendo 64 games GoldenEye 007 and Perfect Dark. It was also considered superior to its PlayStation counterpart because of its level design and inclusion of a multiplayer mode. Matt Casamassina of IGN felt that Eurocom did "an amazing job recreating the cinema experience for the Nintendo 64 owner, perhaps more so than any other movie-to-game license to date." In a less positive review, Shane Satterfield of GameSpot stated that The World Is Not Enough "belongs in the upper echelon of Nintendo 64 software", but it lacks the gameplay delicacy of GoldenEye 007 to reach classic status. Edge concluded that, while the game lacks innovative elements, it "still offers plenty of enjoyment for those who have exhausted Rare's masterpieces." Next Generation agreed, stating that The World Is Not Enough is far from a bad game.

Its graphics were widely praised for long draw distances and smooth frame rates. Critics also noted the game's believable environments, texture quality, animations, and highly detailed explosions and particle effects. The soundtrack and sound effects received similar praise. GameRevolution said that the background themes "make for excellent espionage", while Nintendo Power observed that the spoken dialogue "adds a cinematic touch" that GoldenEye 007 does not feature. GamePro stated similar pros, but criticised the plot for being confusing and "too complex for its own good."

IGN praised the single-player missions for their variety and great enemy placement, noting that each scenario is different in both design and gameplay mechanics. The reviewer especially highlighted the last mission due to its underwater sections, as it requires players to find hidden air pockets so that Bond can breathe and stay alive. In contrast, Mark Green of N64 Magazine remarked that the missions were fairly scripted, limiting the player's options and experimentation. Similarly, Edge said that the game's "on the fly" mission objectives give the game a fair amount of rigidity. The reviewer explained that, while GoldenEye 007 or Perfect Dark set their mission objectives at the beginning of each level, thus giving players a chance to tackle the mission as they wish, The World Is Not Enough "cannonballs" the player "from one objective to the next with little room for invention of improvisation." Nevertheless, he highlighted the Night Watch level for being "fantastically stealth-centric".

The game's weak and inconsistent enemy artificial intelligence was a common subject of criticism. GameSpot described the behaviour of enemies as "They see, they run, they shoot - and that's about it", while N64 Magazine noted that they regularly fail to spot the player even when standing next to them. The gadgetry was seen as a useful gameplay feature, with AllGame noting that players need to figure out the proper way to use each gadget. Although GameZone highlighted the multiplayer mode for its replay value and teamplay options, critics agreed that the game felt short in comparison to Perfect Dark. The artificial intelligence of multiplayer bots was also a frequent criticism. According to GameSpot, "they generally amount to nothing more than fragging". The website would later nominate The World Is Not Enough for its annual Most Disappointing Game award, calling it "far from the GoldenEye 007/Perfect Dark killer that it was made out to be."

As of December 2007, The World Is Not Enough has sold more than one million copies in the United States.
