= The World Is Not Enough (PlayStation video game) =

2000 video game

- North American box art
- Developer: Black Ops Entertainment
- Publisher: Electronic Arts
- Director: Jose Villeta
- Producer: Jose Villeta
- Designer: Daryl Kimoto
- Programmers: Kyle Riccio; William Botti
- Writers: William Botti; Daryl Kimoto
- Series: James Bond
- Platform: PlayStation
- Release: NA: November 7, 2000; EU: November 17, 2000
- Genres: First-person shooter, stealth
- Mode: Single-player

The World Is Not Enough is a first-person shooter video game developed by Black Ops Entertainment and based on the 1999 James Bond film of the same name. It was published by Electronic Arts and released for the PlayStation on November 7, 2000, shortly after the release of its Nintendo 64 counterpart. The World Is Not Enough is the successor to Black Ops Entertainment's 1999 title Tomorrow Never Dies and uses an improved version of its engine. The game received mixed reviews from critics, who criticised its short length and lack of multiplayer mode.

== Gameplay ==
Unlike its predecessor, The World Is Not Enough is played from a first-person perspective. Ammunition information is displayed at the bottom right corner.

The World Is Not Enough is a first-person shooter based on MGM's 1999 James Bond film of the same name, where the player assumes the role of James Bond through 11 different missions. In each mission, the player must complete many objectives while defeating enemies controlled by the game's artificial intelligence. Objectives range from rescuing hostages to destroying vehicles and collecting items. Some objectives require the player to use numerous high-tech gadgets. For example, the Credit Card Lockpick can be used to open locked doors, while the Micro Camera is useful for photographing evidence. There is one mission that does not involve combat, and requires the player to play blackjack in a casino and win consistently.

As a first-person shooter, combat takes place in real-time and from a first-person perspective. The player can use several weapons, including submachine guns, shotguns, a tranquilizer gun, a sniper rifle, and a rocket launcher. Weapons must be reloaded after a certain number of shots. The player has a certain amount of health which decreases when attacked by enemies. Heavy and Light Armor power-ups that absorb extra damage can be collected throughout the game. These power-ups, however, cannot protect the player from extreme falls or radiation. The game features several lengthy cuts from the film as cutscenes.

== Development and release ==
The World Is Not Enough was developed by Black Ops Entertainment and published by Electronic Arts as a follow-up to the 1999 title Tomorrow Never Dies. The game uses an improved version of the Tomorrow Never Dies engine, whose perspective was changed from third-person to first-person. Producer Joel Wade explained that the first-person perspective would help immerse the player deeper into the game and make the gameplay experience more intense. As a result, new animations, scripted sequences, and sound effects had to be added. Black Ops also took creative license to enrich the gameplay experience with new characters during the missions.

The developers improved the targeting system and rewrote the rendering engine to improve the draw distances without impacting the frame rate. Each enemy character was motion-captured with more than 30 different animations. Keanu Reeves' stunt double from The Matrix was hired to pull off the movements, resulting in the game having more than 300 animations. A multiplayer mode was originally planned, but the idea was ultimately abandoned because developers felt it would take away valuable production time and therefore reduce the quality of the main game. The World Is Not Enough was released for the PlayStation video game console on November 7, 2000, shortly after the release of its Nintendo 64 counterpart. According to the developer, the game was produced over 17 months.

== Reception ==
Reception

Aggregate score
| Aggregator | Score |
|---|---|
| Metacritic | 61/100 |

Review scores
| Publication | Score |
|---|---|
| CNET Gamecenter | 5/10 |
| Electronic Gaming Monthly | 6.17/10 (Note: Three critics of Electronic Gaming Monthly gave the game each a score of 5.5/10, 6/10, and 7/10.) |
| EP Daily | 7/10 |
| Game Informer | 7/10 |
| GameRevolution | B |
| GameSpot | 6.7/10 |
| GameZone | 8.5/10 |
| IGN | 6.9/10 |
| Next Generation | 3/5 |
| Official U.S. PlayStation Magazine | 3/5 |
| The Cincinnati Enquirer | 4/5 |

According to the developer, the game sold nearly 1.5 million units worldwide. In the UK, the game received a "Gold" sales award from the Entertainment and Leisure Software Publishers Association, indicating sales of at least 200,000 units.

The World Is Not Enough received mixed reviews from critics. Although the game was seen as an improvement over Tomorrow Never Dies, some reviewers felt that it was inferior to its Nintendo 64 counterpart. Douglass C. Perry of IGN described The World Is Not Enough as "a short, rudimentary shooter with nothing more than a few good gadgets and a great license backing it up", while Samuel Bass of Daily Radar stated that the game "succeeds reasonably well" as "a shallow movie-licensed action experience." Shane Satterfield of GameSpot concluded that the game "is not GoldenEye for the PlayStation, but if you're tired of playing through Medal of Honor or Metal Gear Solid, it provides temporary relief for your stealth shooting addiction."

Writing for GameRevolution, Shawn Sparks highlighted positively the graphics for their clean textures and character details despite the PlayStation hardware limitations. He also credited the soundtrack for being "exciting during action and dramatic while stealthing around", but considered the voice acting to be weak. Crispin Boyer of Electronic Gaming Monthly felt that the game overall looked better than Tomorrow Never Dies, but remarked that the player can occasionally get stuck on walls and objects while strafing. IGN criticized the game's "absolutely horrible" character animations and its overuse of the James Bond theme song, while Michael Lafferty of GameZone praised its smooth gameplay, vocal characterizations, and interactive environments.

Paul Anderson of Game Informer criticized the game's short length and lack of depth, stating that nearly all of the weapons offer the same advantages and disadvantages. Similarly, Daily Radar condemned the game's poor artificial intelligence and shallow stealth gameplay. According to the reviewer, "most espionage segments boil down to little more than scripted sequences and the occasional bout of old-fashioned button pushing." NextGen's Bass criticized the simplistic enemy behaviors because they make long levels repetitive and dull, and GameSpot noted the game's poor replay value due to the lack of a multiplayer mode, saying that The World Is Not Enough can be completed in less than a day. Nevertheless, the game's varied level design and numerous gadgets were highlighted positively, with GameRevolution stating that "more games should have this much variation and less redundancy." Extreme Ahab of GamePro summed up in his review: "If you're out for more action after Medal of Honor: Underground, The World Is Not Enough, though a step-down, should satisfy your craving for espionage and firefights; but if you're lusting for a truly great game in which suspense and action make for a perfect union, you may be a bit disappointed." (Note: GamePro gave the game two 4/5 scores for graphics and fun factor, 4.5/5 for sound, and 3.5/5 for control.)
