= Elektra King =

- James Bond character
- Sophie Marceau as Elektra King
- First appearance: The World Is Not Enough (1999)
- Portrayed by: Sophie Marceau

In-universe information
- Gender: Female
- Affiliation: King Enterprises, Renard
- Classification: Bond girl / Villain

Elektra Vavra King is a character and one of the two main antagonists, along with Renard, in the James Bond film The World Is Not Enough, played by French actress Sophie Marceau.

== Biography ==
Elektra King is the daughter of Scottish oil magnate Sir Robert King (David Calder) and his Azerbaijani wife. Sir Robert had acquired his wife's oil wealth and merged it into his own construction business, forming King Enterprises.

As a teenager, Elektra was kidnapped by Victor "Renard" Zokas (Robert Carlyle), a terrorist and former KGB agent. On the advice of M (Judi Dench), a family friend, Sir Robert refused to pay the ransom.

Elektra was embittered, and became Renard's lover. She joined in Renard's extortion scheme and mutilated her own ear to send to her father. James Bond (Pierce Brosnan) speculates that, after her kidnapping, she was suffering from Stockholm syndrome.

Elektra assists Renard in killing her father, after which they attempt to blow up his oil pipeline as part of an elaborate plan to steal his fortune. Elektra impresses Bond by brazenly betting one million dollars on a card game and shrugging it off when she loses. They briefly become lovers, before she and Renard kidnap him, alongside M and nuclear physicist Dr. Christmas Jones (Denise Richards). Bond is tortured with a garrote, but manages to escape and free M when his erstwhile ally Valentine Zukovsky (Robbie Coltrane), shot by Elektra, damages one of the garrote's arm restraints, before dying. Holding Elektra at gunpoint, Bond orders her to call off Renard from firing a nuclear missile at the pipeline. Elektra taunts Bond, saying, "You won't kill me – you'd miss me" and tells Renard to fire the missile. Bond then shoots her dead, saying "I never miss", though shows some brief regret for having to do so. He then also kills Renard and frees Christmas.

== Portrayal ==
Marceau's portrayal of Elektra earned her a nomination for Best Actress at the 2000 Empire Awards.

The film's costume designer, Lindy Hemming, highlighted Elektra's exoticism by "adorning her in luxuriant textiles."

== Analysis ==
Alexander Sergeant suggests that Elektra King's name is a "deliberate play on Jung's concept of the Electra complex," which is based on Electra in Greek mythology.

Kirsten Smith suggests that "Elektra holds some of the characteristics of the femme fatale displayed in her clothing choices, her quest for power over all the men in her life, and her ability to use sex to enhance her position." Smith goes on to say, however, that Elektra is also a "damaged and complex woman trying to redeem her mother's name and cultural heritage."

Dean Kowalski notes that while we are led to believe Renard is the main villain of the film, Elektra is actually the "brains and evil heart of the operation." Kowalski concludes that "Elektra's attitudes and behavior are reminiscent of the yin force and exactly what we would expect of a strong (even if misguided) female character."
