= The World Is Not Enough =

1999 James Bond film directed by Michael Apted

- Theatrical release poster
- Directed by: Michael Apted
- Screenplay by: Neal Purvis; Robert Wade; Bruce Feirstein
- Story by: Neal Purvis; Robert Wade
- Based on: James Bond by Ian Fleming
- Produced by: Michael G. Wilson; Barbara Broccoli
- Starring: Pierce Brosnan; Sophie Marceau; Robert Carlyle; Denise Richards; Robbie Coltrane; Judi Dench
- Cinematography: Adrian Biddle
- Edited by: Jim Clark
- Music by: David Arnold
- Production companies: Metro-Goldwyn-Mayer; Eon Productions Limited
- Distributed by: MGM Distribution Co. (United States and Canada); United International Pictures (International)
- Release dates: 8 November 1999 (Los Angeles, premiere); 19 November 1999 (United States); 26 November 1999 (United Kingdom)
- Running time: 128 minutes
- Countries: United Kingdom; United States
- Language: English
- Budget: $135 million
- Box office: $361 million

The World Is Not Enough is a 1999 spy film, the nineteenth in the James Bond series produced by Eon Productions and the third to star Pierce Brosnan as the fictional MI6 agent James Bond. It was directed by Michael Apted, from an original story and screenplay by Neal Purvis, Robert Wade, and Bruce Feirstein. It was produced by Michael G. Wilson and Barbara Broccoli. The title is the translation of the motto on the Bond family coat of arms, first seen in On Her Majesty's Secret Service.

The film's plot revolves around the murder of billionaire businessman Sir Robert King by the terrorist Renard, and Bond's subsequent assignment to protect King's daughter Elektra, who was previously held for ransom by Renard. During his assignment, Bond unravels a scheme to increase petroleum prices by triggering a nuclear meltdown in the waters of Istanbul.

Filming locations included Spain, France, Azerbaijan, Turkey, and the UK, with interiors shot at Pinewood Studios. Despite receiving mixed reviews from critics, with the plot and Denise Richards' casting frequently targeted for criticism, The World Is Not Enough earned over $361 million worldwide, becoming the eighth highest-grossing film of 1999, as well as the highest-grossing James Bond film at the time. It was also the first Eon-produced Bond film officially released by the mainline Metro-Goldwyn-Mayer label instead of United Artists, the franchise's original owner and distributor.

The World Is Not Enough was followed by Die Another Day in 2002.

== Plot ==
In Bilbao, MI6 agent James Bond meets Swiss banker Lachaise to retrieve money for Sir Robert King, a British oil tycoon and friend of M. Bond interrogates the banker to identify the assassin of an MI6 agent, but Lachaise is killed before revealing this information, and Bond is forced to escape with the money. At MI6 headquarters in London, the money is revealed to be laced with explosives that kill King. Bond chases the assassin by boat on the Thames to the Millennium Dome, where she attempts to escape via hot air balloon. Bond offers her protection; she refuses, fearing he would not be able to protect her, and blows up the balloon at the cost of her life.

Bond traces the recovered money to Renard, a KGB agent turned anarchist terrorist. Following an earlier attempt on his life by MI6, Renard was left with a bullet embedded in his brain, which makes him immune to pain but will eventually kill him. M assigns Bond to protect King's daughter Elektra, whom Renard had previously abducted and held for ransom. Bond flies to Azerbaijan, where Elektra oversees the construction of an oil pipeline. During a tour of the pipeline's proposed route in the mountains, Bond and Elektra are attacked by a hit squad in snowmobiles.

Bond visits Valentin Zukovsky at a casino to acquire information about Elektra's attackers. There, Bond grows suspicious when Elektra immediately loses $1 million at a high-card draw game and discovers that her head of security, Sasha Davidov, is secretly in league with Renard. Bond kills Davidov and boards a plane bound for an ex-Soviet ICBM base in Kazakhstan. Posing as a Russian scientist, Bond meets American nuclear physicist Dr. Christmas Jones, who is cooperating with Russian armed forces in overseeing the dismantling of the site. Renard removes the GPS locator card and weapons-grade plutonium core from a nuclear warhead. Before Bond can kill him, Jones exposes Bond's cover. Renard steals the bomb and flees, leaving everyone to die. Bond and Jones escape the exploding silo with the locator card.

In Azerbaijan, Bond warns M that Elektra may have succumbed to Stockholm Syndrome when she was Renard's false hostage and hands M the locator card as proof of Renard's theft. An alarm sounds, revealing that the stolen bomb is attached to a scraper heading towards the oil terminal. Bond and Jones enter the pipeline to deactivate the bomb, and Jones discovers that half of the plutonium is missing. They jump clear of the rig, and a section of pipe is destroyed. Bond and Jones are presumed killed. Back at the command centre, Elektra reveals that she killed her father as revenge for using her as bait for Renard. She abducts M, whom she resents for having advised her father not to pay the ransom.

Bond accosts Zukovsky at his caviar factory in the Caspian Sea, and they are attacked by Elektra's helicopters. Zukovsky reveals that his arrangement with Elektra was to accept a payoff in the form of bets at his casino in exchange for the use of an old Soviet-era nuclear submarine captained by his nephew in the Black Sea Fleet. The group goes to Istanbul, where Jones realises that if Renard were to insert the stolen plutonium into the submarine's nuclear reactor, the resulting meltdown would destroy Istanbul, sabotaging the main alternative oil pipelines passing through the Bosporus. Elektra's pipeline, planned to go around Istanbul, would increase in value.

Bond gets a signal from the locator card at the Maiden's Tower before Zukovsky's henchman Bull blows up the command centre. Zukovsky is knocked unconscious, and Bond and Jones are captured by Elektra's henchmen. Jones is taken aboard the submarine, which was seized by Renard's men. Bond is taken to the tower, where Elektra tortures him with a garrote and reveals that she cut off part of her own ear to prevent any suspicion about her relationship with Renard. Zukovsky and his men seize the tower, but Zukovsky is shot by Elektra. Before dying, Zukovsky uses his cane gun to free Bond, who frees M and kills Elektra.

Bond dives after the submarine, boards it, and frees Jones. The submarine's hull ruptures as it sinks into the Bosporus. Bond fights Renard and impales him by firing the plutonium rod into his chest. Bond and Jones escape from the submarine, leaving the flooded reactor to detonate underwater. Later, they celebrate the New Year and have sex in Istanbul while being monitored by MI6 satellites. M is appalled by Bond's conduct with Christmas, but "R", the successor to Q, Bond's quartermaster, dismisses their sexual activity as a glitch on the satellite screen.

== Cast ==
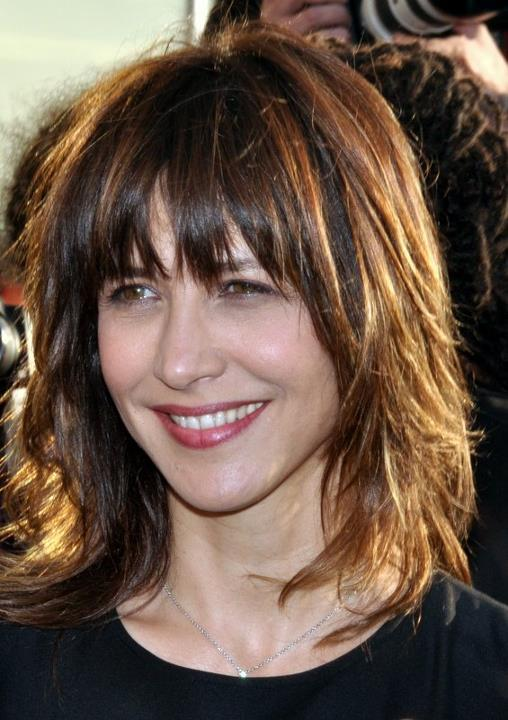
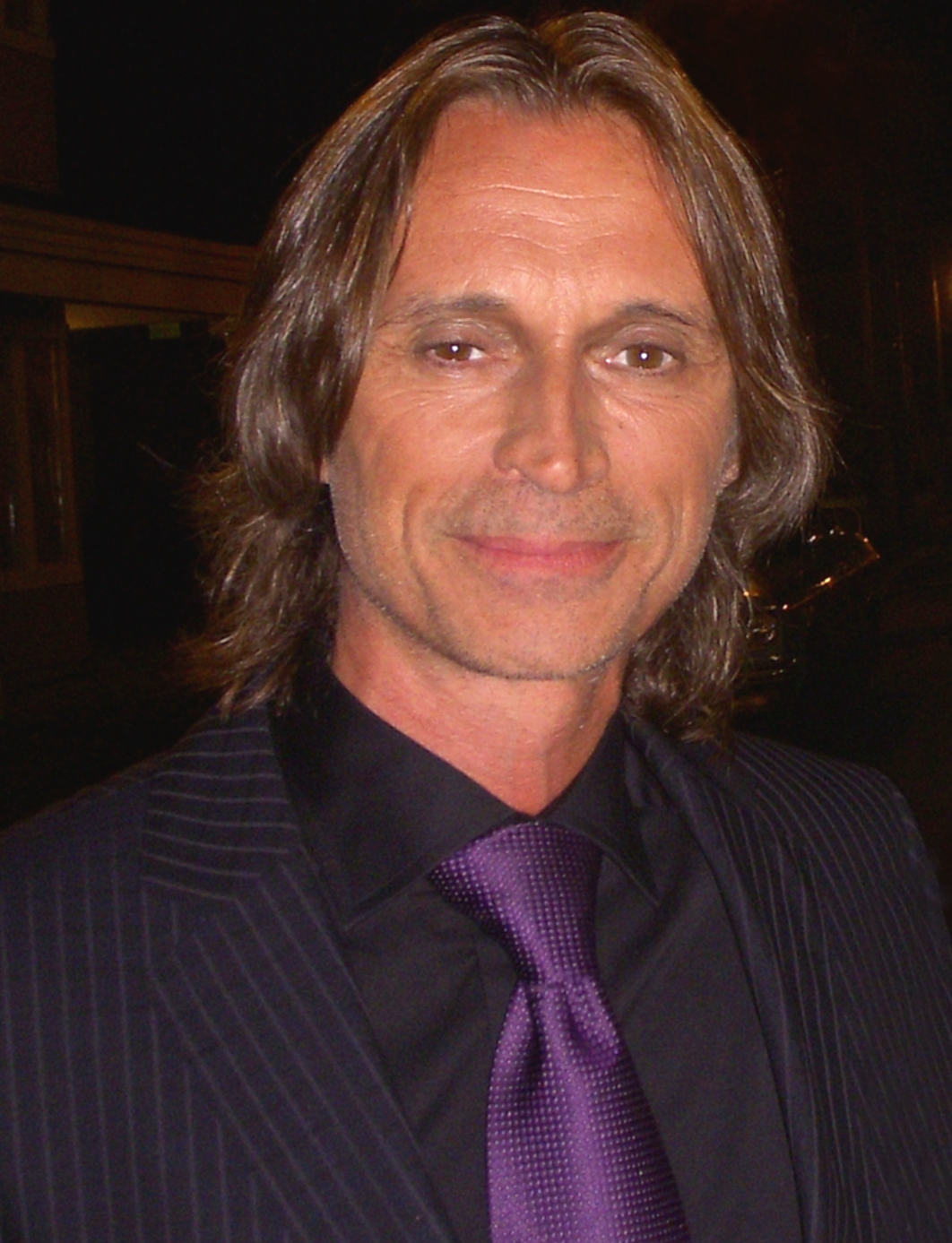
Pierce Brosnan (left) in 2017, Sophie Marceau (in 2012) and Robert Carlyle (in 2011)
- Pierce Brosnan as James Bond, MI6 agent, codename 007.
- Sophie Marceau as Elektra King, an oil heiress who is seemingly being falsely targeted by Renard, the world's most wanted terrorist. M gives Bond the task of protecting her at all costs, although he suspects that there is more to her than meets the eye. Sharon Stone and Vera Farmiga were also considered for the role before Broccoli saw Marceau's performance in Firelight.
- Robert Carlyle as Victor "Renard" Zokas, a former KGB agent turned high-tech terrorist who previously kidnapped Elektra. After a failed assassination attempt he has a bullet lodged in his brain, rendering him impervious to pain as well as slowly killing off his other senses, and ultimately killing him as well. Before the casting of Carlyle the role was offered to Javier Bardem (who would later portray the Bond villain in Skyfall) and Jean Reno.
- Denise Richards as Dr. Christmas Jones, an American nuclear physicist assisting Bond in his mission. Richards stated that she liked the role because it was "brainy", "athletic", and had "depth of character, in contrast to Bond girls from previous decades". Richards stated that a lot of viewers "made fun of" the character's attire but that "these Bond girls are so outrageous and if I did really look like a scientist, the Bond fans would have been disappointed." Jones was originally written as a French-Polynesian insurance investigator before but the studio insisted on changing her nationality after the casting of Marceau. Tiffani Thiessen also auditioned.
- Robbie Coltrane as Valentin Zukovsky: A former Russian mafia boss and Baku casino owner. Bond initially seeks out Zukovsky for intel on Renard and is subsequently aided by him when Zukovsky's nephew falls into Renard's captivity. Coltrane reprises his role from GoldenEye.
- Desmond Llewelyn as Q: MI6's quartermaster who supplies Bond with multi-purpose vehicles and gadgets useful for the latter's mission. The film would be Llewelyn's final performance as Q. Although the actor was not officially retiring from the role, the Q character was training his eventual replacement in this film. Llewelyn was killed in a car crash shortly after the film premiered.
- Maria Grazia Cucinotta as "Cigar Girl": An experienced hitwoman working alone, who appears as an assistant who supplies Bond and Lachaise with cigars during their meeting in Bilbao but tries to kill Bond in London. In the novelisation, the character is given the name Giulietta da Vinci.
- Samantha Bond as Miss Moneypenny: M's secretary.
- Michael Kitchen as Bill Tanner: M's Chief of Staff.
- Colin Salmon as Charles Robinson: M's Deputy Chief of Staff.
- Serena Scott Thomas as Dr. Molly Warmflash, an MI6 agent and doctor assigned to examine Bond, as well as describing Renard's seeming invincibility due to the terminal bullet in his brain that will kill him when it reaches the center of his brain.
- Ulrich Thomsen as Sasha Davidov: Elektra King's head of security in Azerbaijan and Renard's secret liaison.
- Goldie as Bull: Valentin Zukovsky's gold-toothed and gold-haired bodyguard, secretly working for Elektra and Renard. Although listed as 'Bull' in the credits, Zukovsky also refers to him as 'Mr. Bullion' in the film.
- John Seru as Gabor: Elektra King's bodyguard who is seen accompanying King wherever she travels.
- Claude-Oliver Rudolph as Colonel Akakievich: The leader of the Russian ICBM base in Kazakhstan.
- Judi Dench as M: The head of MI6.
- Patrick Malahide as Lachaise, the Swiss banker killed at the beginning of the film.
- Gary Powell as Submarine Crewman (uncredited)
- John Cleese as R: Q's assistant and appointed successor. Bond humorously refers to him as "R": "If you're Q, does that make him R?"

== Production ==
=== Development ===
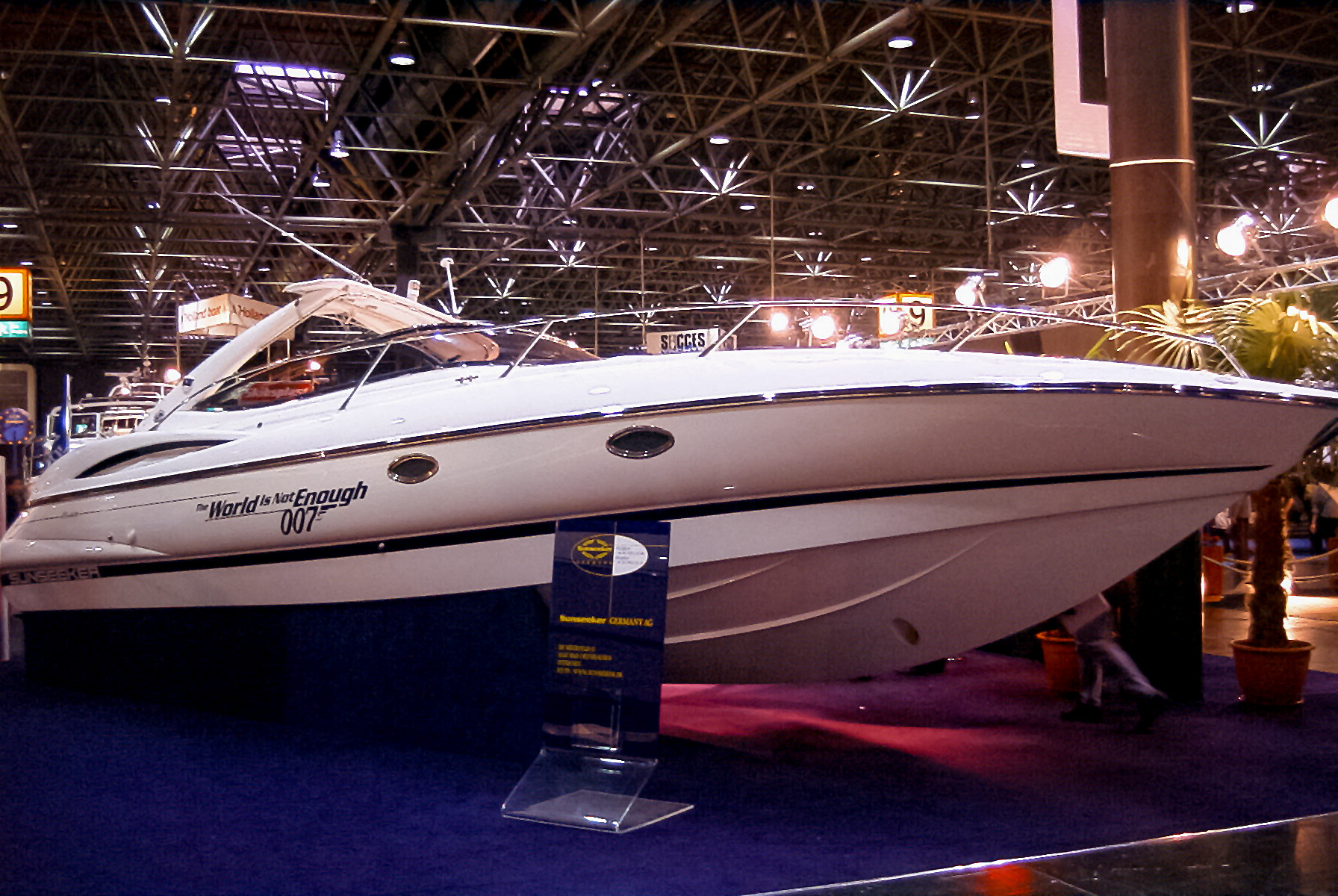
Yacht used in the opening boat chase, on display at boot Düsseldorf in spring 2000

In November 1997, a month prior to the release of Tomorrow Never Dies, Barbara Broccoli watched a news report on Nightline detailing how the world's major oil companies were vying for control of the untapped oil reserves in the Caspian Sea in the wake of the Soviet Union's collapse, and suggested that controlling the only pipeline from the Caspian to the West would be an appropriate motivation for a potential Bond villain. She and Michael G. Wilson hired screenwriters Neal Purvis and Robert Wade to work on the film following their work on Plunkett & Macleane; Purvis and Wade would eventually write or co-write all of the following Bond films up to No Time to Die. The screenwriters incorporated material from the abandoned Bond screenplay Reunion with Death, which had been conceived in 1993 with Timothy Dalton as Bond. Broccoli was especially impressed by the writers' suggestion of a female main villain, stating that "With Elektra, Bond thinks he has found Tracy, but he's really found Blofeld".

Joe Dante, and later Peter Jackson, were initially offered the opportunity to direct the film. Barbara Broccoli enjoyed Jackson's Heavenly Creatures, and a screening of The Frighteners was arranged for her. She disliked the latter film, however, and showed no further interest in Jackson. Jackson, a lifelong Bond fan, remarked that as Eon tended to go for less famous directors, he would likely not get another chance to direct a Bond film after The Lord of the Rings. Barbara Broccoli also was in talks with Alfonso Cuarón to direct, who nearly accepted. Hoping to find a director capable of eliciting strong performances from women, the producers eventually hired Michael Apted, as his work with Sissy Spacek in Coal Miner's Daughter, Sigourney Weaver in Gorillas in the Mist and Jodie Foster in Nell has earned all three actresses Oscar nominations (with Spacek winning). Apted's then-wife Dana Stevens did an uncredited rewrite, primarily to strengthen the female characters' roles, before Bruce Feirstein, who had worked in the previous two films, was hired to work on Bond's role.

Initially the film was to be released in 2000, rumoured to be titled Bond 2000. Other rumoured titles included Death Waits for No Man, Fire and Ice, Pressure Point and Dangerously Yours. The eventual title The World Is Not Enough is an English translation of the Latin phrase Orbis non sufficit, the motto of Bond's supposed real-world ancestor Sir Thomas Bond. In the novel On Her Majesty's Secret Service and its film adaptation, it is first claimed to be James Bond's family motto as well.

The phrase Orbis non sufficit is thought to originate from the Pharsalia by Lucan. It appears twice, both with uncomplimentary associations: the first reference is to a group of villainous mutineers, and the second is to the ambitious Julius Caesar. It was then applied to Alexander the Great by Juvenal in his collection of satirical poems, the Satires: "The world was not big enough for Alexander the Great, but a coffin was". Phrased as Non sufficit orbis, it became the motto of the Spanish king Philip II after ascending the Portuguese throne in 1580.

=== Filming ===
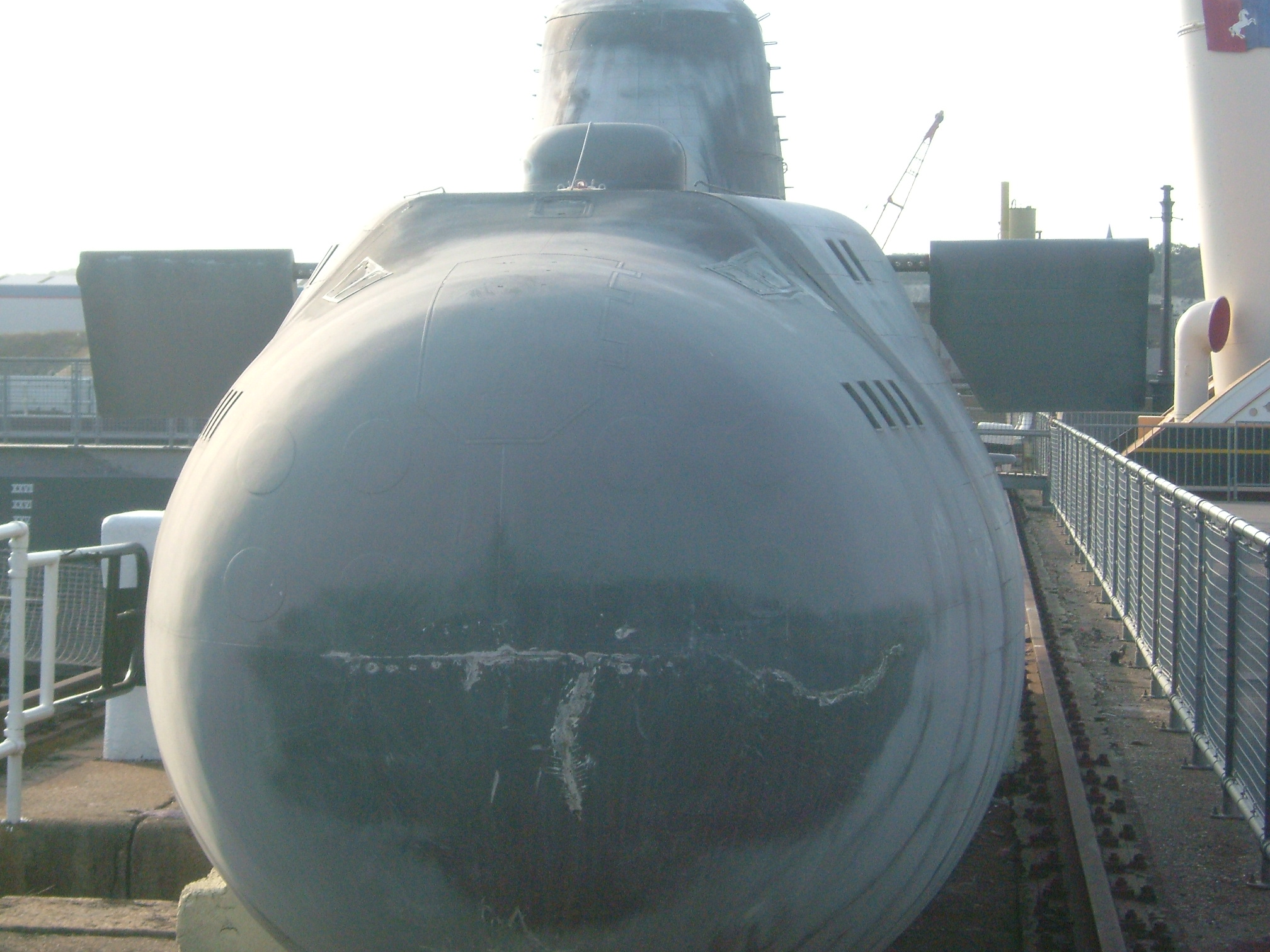
Russian Victor III-class submarine model used in filming

The pre-title sequence begins in Bilbao, Spain, featuring the Guggenheim Museum. After the opening scene, the film moves to London, showcasing the SIS Building and the Millennium Dome on the Thames. The sequence lasts for about 14 minutes, making it the longest pre-title sequence in the series until No Time to Die in 2021. The Daily Telegraph claimed that the British Government prevented some filming in front of the actual MI6 Headquarters at Vauxhall Cross, citing a security risk. However, a Foreign Office spokesperson rejected the claims and expressed displeasure with the article. Following the title sequence, Eilean Donan Castle in Scotland is used by MI6 as a location headquarters. Other locations include Baku, Azerbaijan, the Azerbaijan Oil Rocks and Istanbul, Turkey, where Maiden's Tower and Küçüksu Palace are shown.

Principal photography began on 17 January 1999, and lasted until June of that year. The studio work for the film was shot as usual in Pinewood Studios, including Albert R. Broccoli's 007 Stage. Bilbao, Spain was used briefly for the exterior of the Swiss bank and flyover-bridge adjacent to the Guggenheim Museum. In London outdoor footage was shot of the SIS Building and Vauxhall Cross with several weeks filming the boat chase on the River Thames eastwards towards the Millennium Dome, Greenwich. The canal footage of the chase where Bond soaks the parking wardens was filmed at Wapping and the boat stunts in Millwall Dock and under Glengall Bridge were filmed at the Isle of Dogs. Chatham Dockyard was also used for part of the boat chase. Stowe School, Buckinghamshire, was used as the site of the King family estate on the banks of Loch Lomond. Filming continued in Scotland at Eilean Donan Castle which was used to depict the exterior of MI6 temporary operations centre "Castle Thane". The skiing chase sequence in the Caucasus was shot on the slopes of Chamonix, France. Filming of the scene was delayed by an avalanche; the crew helped in the rescue operation.

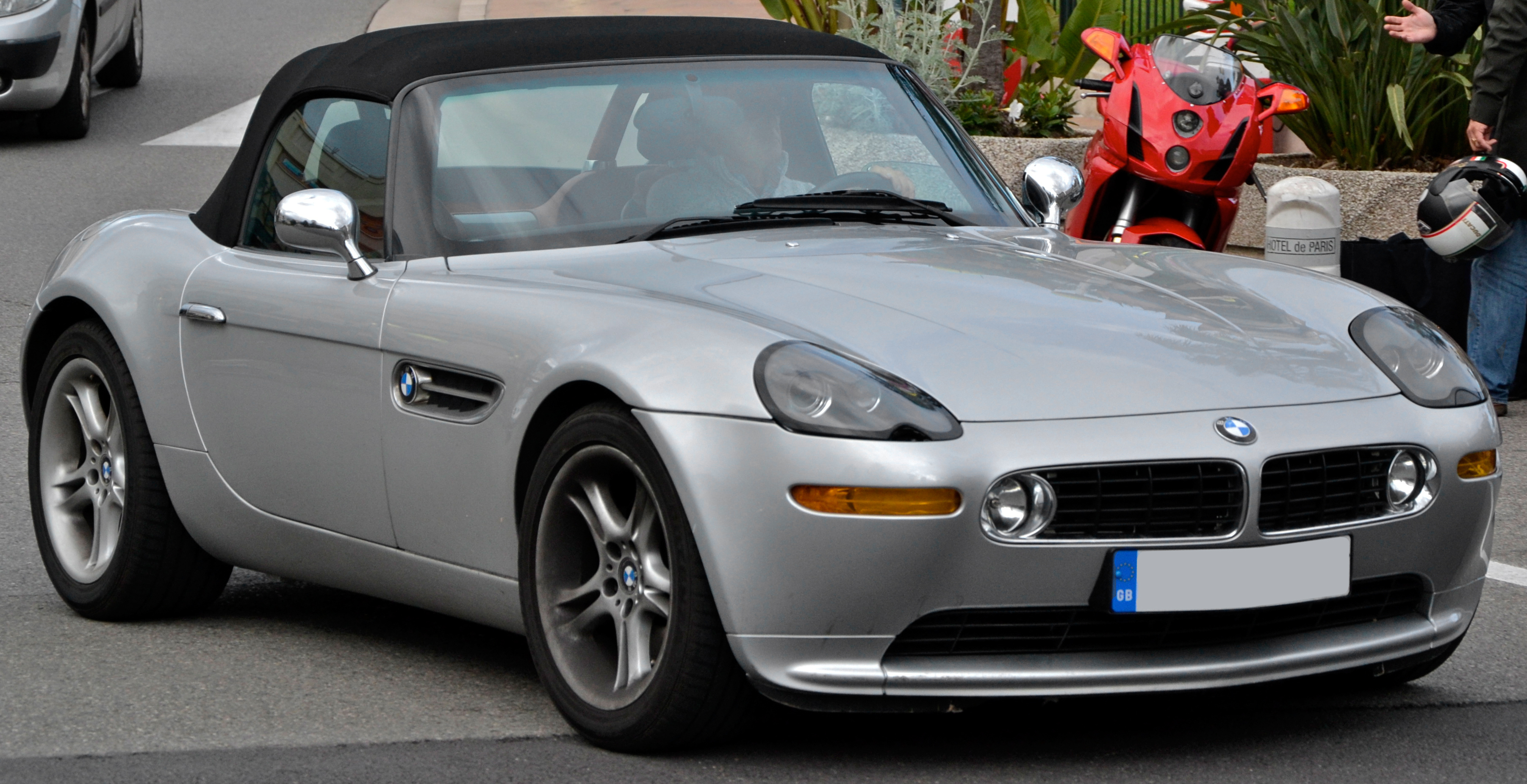
The filming occurred a few months before the BMW Z8 (unit pictured) was released

The interior (and single exterior shot) of L'Or Noir casino in Baku, Azerbaijan, was shot at Halton House, the officers' mess of RAF Halton. RAF Northolt was used to depict the airfield runway in Azerbaijan. Zukovsky's quayside caviar factory was shot entirely at the outdoor water tank at Pinewood. The exterior of Kazakhstan nuclear facility was shot at the Bardenas Reales, in Navarre, Spain, and the exterior of the oil refinery control centre at the Motorola building in Groundwell, Swindon. The exterior of the oil pipeline was filmed in Cwm Dyli, Snowdonia, Wales, while the production teams shot the oil pipeline explosion on Hankley Common, Elstead, Surrey. Istanbul, Turkey, was used in the film, also using the famous Maiden's Tower which was used as Renard's hideout in Turkey. Exteriors for Elektra King's Baku villa were shot at Küçüksu Pavilion in Istanbul, and interiors were shot at Luton Hoo in Bedfordshire, England. The underwater submarine scenes were filmed in the Bahamas.

The BMW Z8 driven by Bond in the film was the final part of a three-film product placement deal with BMW (which began with the Z3 in GoldenEye and continued with the 750iL in Tomorrow Never Dies) but, due to filming preceding release of the Z8 by a few months, several working mock-ups and models were manufactured for filming purposes.

The remote-controlled model submarine used in the film was displayed at Chatham Historic Dockyard until 2022, when it was converted into holiday accommodation on the Isle of Wight.

=== Music ===
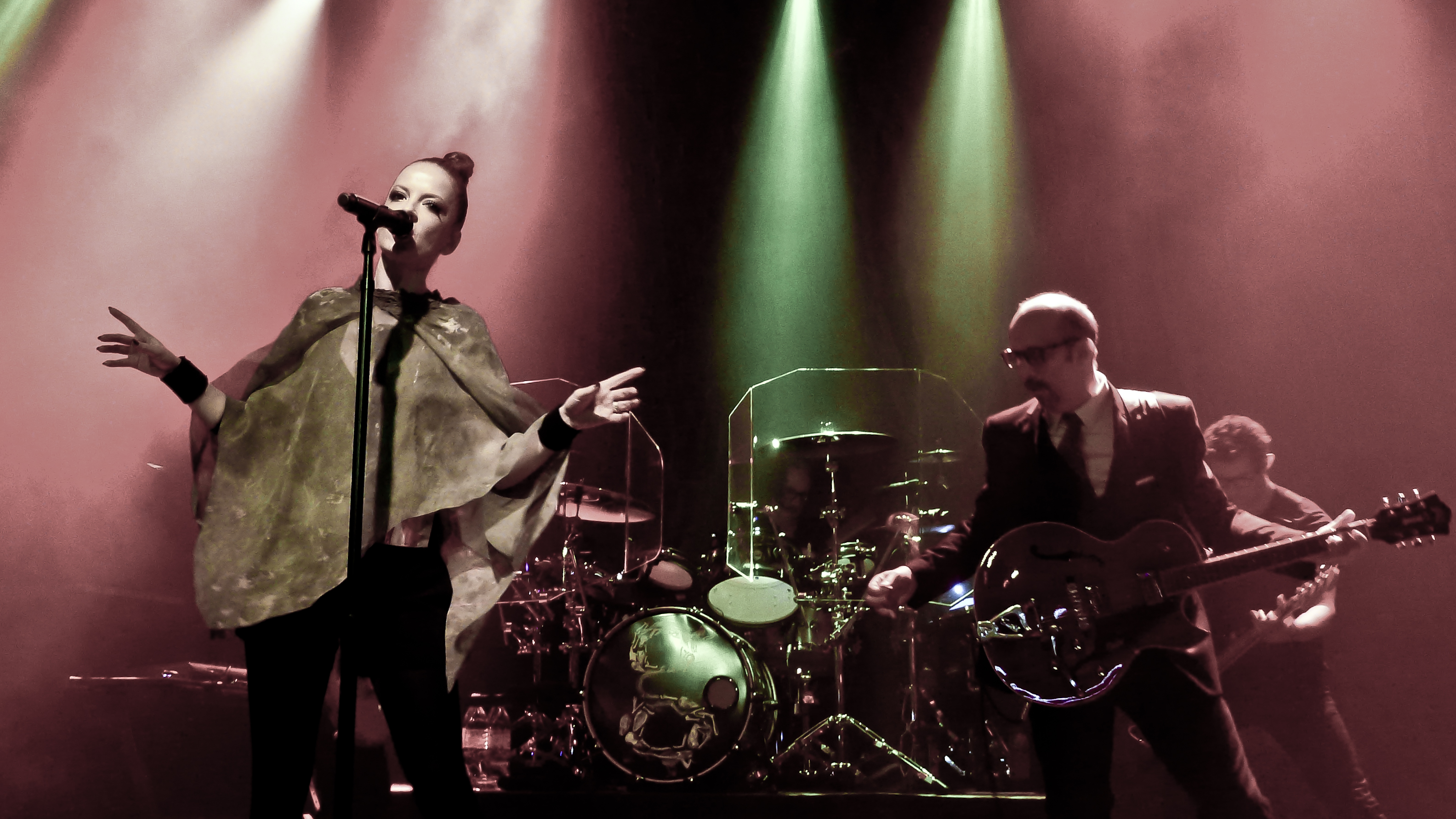
Rock band Garbage (pictured in 2012) sang the film's title song.

The soundtrack to The World Is Not Enough is the second Bond soundtrack to be composed by David Arnold. Arnold broke tradition by not ending the film with a reprise of the opening theme or, as with the previous three films, a new song. Originally, Arnold intended to use the song "Only Myself to Blame" at the end of the film; however, Apted discarded this and the song was replaced by a remix of the "James Bond Theme". "Only Myself to Blame", written by Arnold and Don Black and sung by Scott Walker, is the 19th and final track on the album and its melody is Elektra King's theme. The theme is heard in "Casino", "Elektra's Theme" and "I Never Miss". Arnold added two new themes to the final score, both of which are reused in the following film, Die Another Day.

The title song, "The World Is Not Enough", was written by David Arnold with Don Black and performed by Garbage. It is the fifth Bond theme co-written by Black, preceded by "Thunderball", "Diamonds Are Forever", "The Man with the Golden Gun", and "Tomorrow Never Dies". IGN chose "The World Is Not Enough" as the ninth-best James Bond theme of all time. In 2012 Grantland ranked the song as the second-best Bond song of all time, behind only "Goldfinger." The song also appeared in two "best of 1999" polls: #87 in 89X's "Top 89 Songs of 1999" and No. 100 in Q101's "Top 101 of 1999".

Another theme song was made by English post-Britpop band Straw, which was also entitled The World Is Not Enough but was rejected in favor of Garbage's song. The song is unique as the lyrics contain references to several of the Ian Fleming novels, including references to Goldfinger, You Only Live Twice, On Her Majesty's Secret Service, and Live and Let Die.

== Release and reception ==
The World Is Not Enough premiered on 19 November 1999 in the United States and on 26 November 1999 in the United Kingdom. Its world premiere was 8 November 1999 at the Fox Bruin Theater, Los Angeles, USA. At that time MGM signed a marketing partnership with MTV, primarily for American youths, who were assumed to have considered Bond as "an old-fashioned secret service agent". As a result, MTV broadcast more than 100 hours of Bond-related programmes immediately after the film was released, most being presented by Denise Richards.

=== Box office ===
The film opened at the top of the North American box office ahead of Sleepy Hollow with $35.5 million earned during its opening weekend. Despite falling into second place behind Toy Story 2 the following weekend, it made a $34 million five-day Thanksgiving gross, beating out third place newcomer End of Days. Its final worldwide gross was $361.7 million worldwide, with $126 million in the United States alone. It became the highest-grossing James Bond film of all time (not adjusting for inflation) until the release of Die Another Day. The film was also selected for the first round of nominations for the Academy Award for Best Visual Effects but did not make it to the final nominations. The film was nominated for a Best Action/Adventure/Thriller Film Saturn Award, Pierce Brosnan won both the Empire Award and the Blockbuster Entertainment Award as Best Actor, and David Arnold won a BMI Film Music Award for his score. The film became the first in the Bond series to win a Golden Raspberry when Denise Richards was chosen as "Worst Supporting Actress" at the 1999 Razzie Awards. Richards and Brosnan were also nominated for "Worst Screen Couple" (lost to Will Smith and Kevin Kline for Wild Wild West). The initial release of the DVD includes the featurette "Secrets of 007", which cuts into "making of" material during the film; the documentary "The Making of The World Is Not Enough"; two commentary tracks—one by director Michael Apted, and the other by production designer Peter Lamont, second unit director Vic Armstrong, and composer David Arnold; a trailer for the PlayStation video game, and the Garbage music video. The Ultimate Edition DVD released in 2006 has additional extras such as a 2000 documentary named "Bond Cocktail", a featurette on shooting the Q Boat scenes, Pierce Brosnan in a press conference in Hong Kong, deleted scenes, and a tribute to Desmond Llewelyn.

=== Critical reception ===
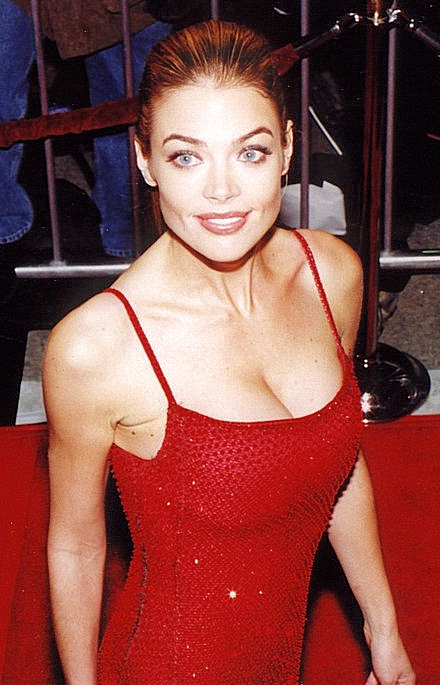
Denise Richards (pictured at the film's premiere) was widely criticised for her performance.

Reception was mixed. On Rotten Tomatoes, the film received an approval rating of 51% based on 148 reviews, with an average rating of 5.6/10, the lowest of the Brosnan Bond films. The site's critical consensus reads: "Plagued by mediocre writing, uneven acting, and a fairly by-the-numbers plot, The World Is Not Enough is partially saved by some entertaining and truly Bond-worthy action sequences." On Metacritic, the film has a weighted average score of 57 out of 100 based on 38 critics, indicating "mixed and average reviews". Audiences polled by CinemaScore gave the film an average grade of "B+" on an A+ to F scale.

Chicago Sun-Times critic Roger Ebert said the film was a "splendid comic thriller, exciting and graceful, endlessly inventive", and gave it three-and-a-half stars out of four. On the other hand, Eleanor Ringel Gillespie of The Atlanta Journal-Constitution disliked the film, calling it "dated and confused". Nathan Rabin from The A.V. Club opined that "enough fun moments are scattered throughout to make it a decent Bond entry. But the series still needs a massive shot of fresh ideas if it wishes to become anything more than a nostalgia-fueled commercial sure thing". Antonia Quirke from The Independent said that the film "is certainly less definitively feeble than other recent Bond offerings, with an at least two-dimensional female character in the bold and oval Marceau. But my reaction is much the same as to a new Rolling Stones album: I'm just grateful that it's not embarrassing". Negative criticism was focused on the execution of the plot, and the action scenes were considered excessive.

Richards was widely criticized for not being credible in the role of a nuclear scientist, with Variety calling her "the least plausible nuclear physicist in the history of movies, who makes even the electrochemist Elisabeth Shue played in 1997's The Saint sound like a Nobel laureate"; Nathan Rabin panned her performance and called it "so laughably awful that the film comes to a dead stop whenever she's on screen". She was ranked as one of the worst Bond girls of all time by Entertainment Weekly in 2008.

In contrast, Sophie Marceau was praised for her role as Elektra, with most critics agreeing that she was a better Bond Girl than Denise Richards' Christmas Jones and a better Bond villain than Robert Carlyle's Renard. Peter Bradshaw from The Guardian called her "terrific: sexy, stylish, with a really beautiful face entirely innocent of the cosmetic surgeon's art".

==== Retrospective ====
Pete Debruge of Variety wrote in 2012 that "[The World Is Not Enough] presents a conflicted persona torn between the corny antics of the Roger Moore era and the grim seriousness of where things would eventually go under Daniel Craig’s tenure. It also contains a dose of Timothy Dalton-esque toughness [...] Much of what made Brosnan such a great Bond is thrust into the back seat by lame jokes and a premature attempt to mix up the formula", concluding that it was "nothing but a reversion to the franchise's most adolescent tendencies". Entertainment Weekly picked it as the worst Bond film of all time in 2006, saying it had a plot "so convoluted even Pierce Brosnan has admitted to being mystified". Norman Wilner of MSN chose it as the third-worst film, above A View to a Kill and Licence to Kill, while IGN chose it as the fifth-worst, both in 2007.

== Adaptations ==
Bond novelist Raymond Benson wrote his adaptation of The World Is Not Enough from the film's screenplay. It was Benson's fourth Bond novel and followed the story closely, but with some details changed. For instance, Elektra sings quietly before her death and Bond still carries his Walther PPK instead of the newer P99. The novel also gave the cigar girl/assassin the name Giulietta da Vinci and retained a scene between her and Renard that was cut from the film.

In 2000, the film was adapted by Electronic Arts to create two first-person shooters of the same name for the Nintendo 64 and PlayStation. The Nintendo 64 version was developed by Eurocom and the PlayStation version was developed by Black Ops. (Note: Black Ops Entertainment had previously developed Tomorrow Never Dies for the PlayStation, while Eurocom would go on to develop Nightfire in 2002, GoldenEye 007 in 2010 and 007 Legends in 2012.) Versions of The World Is Not Enough for the PC and the PlayStation 2 were planned for release in 2000, but both were cancelled. These versions would have used the id Tech 3 game engine from Quake III Arena, and were subsequently used as the foundation for the game James Bond 007: Agent Under Fire (2001), which otherwise featured an original narrative and depiction of Bond. Although this game marks Pierce Brosnan's fifth appearance in a Bond video game, the game includes only his likeness; the character is voiced by Adam Blackwood.

== See also ==
- Outline of James Bond
