= P. G. Wodehouse locations =

Fictional locations in Wodehouse novels

The following is a list of recurring or notable fictional locations featured in the stories of P. G. Wodehouse, in alphabetical order by place name.

== Angler's Rest ==
The Angler's (or Anglers') Rest is the fictional public house frequented by irrepressible raconteur Mr. Mulliner. At the beginning of each Mulliner short story, Mr. Mulliner and his companions are having a conversation in the bar-parlour that touches on a variety of topics, often unconnected to the previous one. As one patron put it in "Archibald and the Masses": "We range. We flit. We leap from point to point. As an erudite Gin and Angostura once put it, we are like Caesar's wife, ready for anything." The conversations lead Mr. Mulliner to have a recollection of a similar event introducing some new members of the very large Mulliner family. The story then leaves the pub to enter into the narrator's world.

The landlord of The Angler's Rest is named Ernest Biggs ("The Juice of an Orange"), and his amiable barmaid is named Miss Postlethwaite, who is never given a first name even though she appears in most of the stories. She is a romantic type fond of motion picture and romance novels, described as "erudite" and "sensitive." Every Sunday afternoon, she retires to her room with a box of caramels and a novel from the circulating library, and on the following night, she places the results of her reading in front of the habitués of the Angler's Rest and invites their judgment ("The Castaways").

The Angler's Rest takes in residents for longer stay, as in "Unpleasantness at Bludleigh Court", it is mentioned a poet is spending the summer at the place. Across from the bar-parlour there is a larger room where they sometimes give smoking-concerts ("The Knightly Quest of Mervyn").

The Angler's Rest is located in a small English town, the name of which is never given. Some details given are that there is a High Street with a Bon Ton Drapery Stores, whose efficient sales assistant is named Alfred Lukyn ("The Story of Cedric"), and a cinema named the Bijou Dream ("A Slice of Life", "The Nodder" and "The Rise of Minna Nordstrom"). The village also contains a resident doctor ("The Truth About George") and a church ("Anselm Gets His Chance"), with its inevitable Choral Society ("Mulliner's Buck-U-Uppo"). About a mile or two up the river from the Angler's Rest stands an ancient and historic public school ("The Voice from the Past"). The neighborhood also includes a golf course ("Those in Peril on the Tee"), and also a racecourse ("Gala Night").

Mr. Mulliner's pub companions never have a real name but are named after the beverage they are drinking. Mr. Mulliner's own signature beverage is a hot Scotch and lemon. Here is a list of some of these names:

- Gin-and-Ginger-Ale
- Draught Stout
- Small Bass
- Double-Whisky-and-Splash
- Lemon Squash
- Tankard of Ale
- Pint of Stout
- Pint of Bitter
- Pint of Half-and-Half
- Whisky Sour
- Mild and Bitter
- Stout and Bitter
- Rum and Milk
- Sherry and Bitters
- Gin and Angostura
- Lemonade and Angostura
- Port from the Wood
- Eggnog

== Aspinall's ==
Aspinall's is a fictional jewellery store in New Bond Street, London, and is referenced in Joy in the Morning (chapter 5), Full Moon (chapter 2), and Jeeves and the Feudal Spirit (chapter 8). Aspinall's was based on Asprey's store in New Bond Street.

== Barribault's Hotel ==
Barribault's Hotel is a fictional hotel in London. It is a posh, dignified establishment, and may have been modeled on Claridge's. Barribault's first appears in Full Moon, in which it is located in Brook Street. In Spring Fever, the hotel is in Duke Street. In Ice in the Bedroom, it is in Clarges Street. Bertie Wooster has lunch there with Ginger Winship in Much Obliged, Jeeves. Barribault's also features in other novels including Something Fishy and Frozen Assets. It is also featured in Uncle Dynamite.

== Beckford ==
A fictional school, setting of the novel A Prefect's Uncle, and several short stories.

== Belpher ==
A fictional small coastal-village in Hampshire, and the setting for the novel A Damsel in Distress. Belpher was once a prosperous fishing-town made famous by the oyster trade, until it was discovered that the local bay had been polluted, thus driving away much of the tourist and fishing trade.

Local points of interest mentioned in the novel include The Belpher Arms, the village tavern, and Belpher Castle, the home of the aristocratic Marshmoreton family since the Wars of the Roses.

== Berkeley Mansions ==
Berkeley Mansions, Berkeley Square, London W1, is a fictional Mayfair residential building in the Jeeves stories, being the residence of Bertie Wooster. In an early story, Bertie lives at 6A, Crichton Mansions, Berkeley Street, W. but is later residing at Berkeley Mansions in Thank You, Jeeves, though he is obliged to leave after making noise with his banjolele. Bertie apparently returns to the building, as he is residing in Berkeley Mansions in the later novel The Code of the Woosters and specifies that he lives in 3A Berkeley Mansions in Jeeves and the Feudal Spirit. In the 1979 What Ho! Jeeves radio adaptation of Jeeves and the Feudal Spirit, the telephone number for Bertie's flat is Mayfair 2631 (as spoken to a telephone operator), though no telephone number is given for the flat in the original stories.

In A Pelican at Blandings, Galahad Threepwood lives in Berkeley Mansions, on the fourth floor. Galahad had previously lived in a flat in Duke Street, St James's.

Wodehouse briefly lived in a flat in Berkeley Street in 1922, the same year that the story showing Bertie living in Berkeley Street (in Crichton Mansions), "Sir Roderick Comes to Lunch", was published.

== Blandings Castle ==
Blandings Castle is a fictional location central to many P. G. Wodehouse stories. It is an idyllic country house.

== Blandings Parva ==
A small fictional hamlet near Blandings Castle. The people of the village enjoy much revelry at the annual School Treat, held on August Bank Holiday every year in the grounds of the Castle, much to Lord Emsworth's horror (not only does his garden become an inferno of children, tents and paper bags, but he is required to wear a top hat and make a speech). Blandings Parva is also known for taking in children from London in need of fresh air, such as Gladys and her brother Ern.

== Brinkley Court ==
The fictional country house of Tom and Dahlia Travers, Brinkley Court is located near Market Snodsbury in Worcestershire, near Droitwich, eight miles from Pershore and about a hundred miles from London. In one instance, it takes Dahlia Travers about three hours to travel from London to Brinkley Court. The residence of the Traverses' children Angela and Bonzo, Brinkley Court is also a popular destination for Bertie Wooster, Dahlia's beloved nephew. Brinkley's butler is named Seppings and its chauffeur Waterbury. Its most famous domestic employee is the gifted French chef Anatole. The Travers family also owns a house in London, located at 47 Charles Street, Berkeley Square.

Brinkley Court is the primary setting of "The Love That Purifies", Right Ho, Jeeves, Jeeves and the Feudal Spirit, Jeeves in the Offing, and Much Obliged, Jeeves. Jeeves works there temporarily in Stiff Upper Lip, Jeeves.

Brinkley is said to be modelled on Severn End, Hanley Castle, in Worcestershire. In the television series Jeeves and Wooster, exterior shots of Brinkley Court were filmed at Barnsley Park, Gloucestershire in series 1 and Hall Barn, Buckinghamshire in series 4. All interior shots of Brinkley Court were filmed at Wrotham Park, Hertfordshire.

The Travers family's address in London, 47 Charles Street, was the same address where Ian Hay, who collaborated with Wodehouse on three plays, lived in 1926.

== Bumpleigh Hall ==
Bumpleigh Hall is a fictional location appearing in Joy in the Morning, being the Hampshire residence of Bertie Wooster's Uncle Percy (Percy Craye, Lord Worplesdon) and Aunt Agatha. It is located near the village of Steeple Bumpleigh. Usual residents include Lord Worplesdon's children Florence Craye and Edwin Craye.

== Chuffnell Hall ==
Chuffnell Hall is the fictional country house of "Chuffy" Chuffnell, located near Chuffnell Regis in Somerset. The house is featured in Thank You, Jeeves. Eventually, Sir Roderick Glossop opened his clinic at the Hall, after his marriage to Lord Chuffnell's aunt.

Bertie Wooster stayed in the nearby cottage called Seaview Cottage, which was burnt down because of Brinkley.

== Chuffnell Regis ==
Chuffnell Regis is a fictional village featured in Thank You, Jeeves. The nearest village to Chuffnell Hall, it is located in Somerset ("Somersetshire" in the novel). In the village is the Seaview Hotel, which has the telephone number Chuffnell Regis 294.

== Corven Abbey ==
See Dreever Castle below.

== Demosthenes Club ==
The Demosthenes Club is a fictional gentlemen's club in Cocktail Time and Ice in the Bedroom. A respectable and dignified institution, it is located across the street from the more boisterous Drones Club. Members of the Demosthenes include Sir Roderick Glossop and John Shoesmith, Freddie Widgeon's employer.

It was based on the Athenaeum Club in London.

== Deverill Hall ==
Deverill Hall is a fictional country house with Tudor architecture, located in Hampshire, in the village of King's Deverill. The setting of The Mating Season, Deverill Hall is the residence of Esmond Haddock, Dame Daphne Winkworth, and her sisters, Emmeline, Charlotte, Myrtle and Harriet, as well as Dame Daphne Winkworth's daughter Gertrude.

Jeeves's uncle Charlie Silversmith is butler at Deverill, and Silversmith's daughter Queenie is the parlourmaid there.

In the Jeeves and Wooster television series, Deverill Hall was filmed at Joyce Grove.

== Ditteredge Hall ==
Ditteredge Hall is the fictional residence of the family of Sir Roderick Glossop in Hampshire in "Scoring off Jeeves".

== Dreever Castle ==
The fictional setting of much of A Gentleman of Leisure, Dreever is a large old place in Shropshire, with heavy grey walls to defend against Welsh marauders, but a comfortable interior. It is owned by Spennie, Lord Dreever, but run by his rich uncle Sir Thomas Blunt. One of the oldest and grandest houses in England, Dreever is famed for an old ghost story, handed down from generation to generation. There is a picturesque rose-garden, and a lake with an island, ideal for young lovers.

In The Gem Collector, an earlier version of the story, the house is called Corven Abbey, and owned by former New York policeman McEachern.

== Drones Club ==
The Drones Club is a fictional gentlemen's club for feckless youth, located in Dover Street, London.

== Easeby Hall ==
Easeby Hall is the fictional Shropshire seat of Bertie Wooster's Uncle Willoughby in "Jeeves Takes Charge".

== Eckleton ==
A fictional school, setting of the novel The Head of Kay's, and several other school stories.

== Emsworth Arms ==
A fictional inn on the High Street in Market Blandings, the Emsworth serves fine ale and makes an ideal meeting-place for conspirators not wishing to be overheard, as well as providing accommodation for anyone wishing to be near Blandings Castle but lacking an invitation.

There is a busy bar downstairs, and a more genteel dining-room on the first floor, with comfortable armchairs ideal for anyone in need of a nap. The garden stretches down to the river, with many shady nooks and summer-house, seemingly ideal for conspirators not wishing to be overheard and weary minds and bodies needing rest. The proprietor, G. Ovens, makes excellent home-brewed ale.

== Halsey Court ==
Halsey Court is a fictional London cul-de-sac that is not fashionable despite being located in Mayfair. It is featured in several stories, including Galahad at Blandings, Money in the Bank, and Frozen Assets. In Frozen Assets, Halsey Court is said to be located just round the corner from Barribault's.

== Heath House ==
The fictional home of Ukridge's Aunt Julia, Heath House is a large mansion near Wimbledon Common, set back from the road in the seclusion of spacious grounds. Ukridge lives there from time to time, in between being thrown out by his aunt for his misdeeds. The grounds are in much demand for dancing societies and charitable fetes. Among the staff of the house have been, at times, the likes of Oakshott the butler, and "Battling" Billson, a temporary handyman, and James Corcoran is rarely welcome there.

The house is occasionally called "The Cedars" in later stories.

== Ickenham Hall ==
The fictional Hampshire seat of Frederick Twistleton, Earl of Ickenham, where he lives much of the time, his wife Jane (Countess of Ickenham) having forbidden him to visit London lest he wreak his usual havoc. Polly Pott gambolled in the grounds as a child; there are too many statues there.

== Junior Ganymede Club ==
The Junior Ganymede Club is a fictional club for valets and butlers, of which Jeeves is a member. The club is located in Curzon Street in Mayfair, as stated in three novels and one short story. In Much Obliged, Jeeves, while Bertie and Jeeves are in Curzon Street, Jeeves says that the club is "just round the corner". (Curzon Street is not straight, so the club could be "round the corner" and still on the same street.)

Aside from socializing, the club's main activities are bridge and the writing and perusal of the club book, which has been in existence for more than eighty years and has reached its twelfth volume. According to Rule Eleven of the club's constitution, all members must record information about their employers in the club book. Information in the club book about Roderick Spode proves crucial in The Code of the Woosters. The club book was said to have eleven pages on Bertie Wooster. The total eventually ballooned to eighteen pages, before Jeeves agrees to destroy the pages on Bertie in Much Obliged, Jeeves.

A monthly luncheon is held at the Junior Ganymede. Jeeves is asked to chair the luncheon, which entails delivering a speech, in Jeeves and the Feudal Spirit. Bertie visits the club in Much Obliged, Jeeves. He is not surprised that Jeeves spends so much time there, noting that the Junior Ganymede, while lacking the sprightliness of the Drones Club, is a very cosy and comfortable establishment. It appears that members are not required to resign after relinquishing their positions in service, since one valet, Bingley, retains his membership after retiring.

According to Wodehouse scholar Norman Murphy, the club was inspired by The Running Footman, a pub that was frequented by butlers, valets, and other servants in Mayfair in the 1920s, located in Charles Street (not far from the eastern end of Curzon Street). The pub is now named The Only Running Footman, or The Footman for short.

== King's Deverill ==
King's Deverill is a fictional village near Deverill Hall. The village is featured in The Mating Season.

== Malvern House Preparatory School ==
Malvern House Preparatory School is the preparatory school at Bramley-on-Sea where Bertie Wooster, Kipper Herring, Bingo Little, Freddie Widgeon, Gussie Fink-Nottle and Catsmeat Potter-Pirbright studied in their earlier years. During their education, the school was presided over by the Rev. Aubrey Upjohn. The name comes from the real school which P. G. Wodehouse attended from 1891 to 1893.

== Mammoth Publishing Company ==
A fictional company owned and run by Lord Tilbury, the Mammoth is based at Tilbury House, Tilbury Street (off Fleet Street). The company's output is large and varied, from the gossipy Society Spice to the children's Tiny Tots, and includes newspapers such as the Daily Record, magazines like Home Gossip, and book imprints like the British Pluck Library, home to the adventures of Gridley Quayle, Investigator.

Employees at various times include Tilbury's timid son Roderick, briefly editor of Society Spice, Percy Pilbeam, Roderick's capable assistant who later takes over as editor, Ashe Marson, the writer of the Gridley Quayle stories, Joan Valentine, sometime editor of Home Gossip, and Sam Shotter, who worked for his neighbour Mr Wrenn, editor of Pyke's Home Companion. Monty Bodkin is deputy-editor of Tiny Tots at the start of Heavy Weather, thanks to his uncle Sir Gregory Parsloe-Parsloe meeting with Tilbury at a public dinner; Archie Gilpin was an occasional contributor. Lavender Briggs and Millicent Rigby have both acted as Tilbury's secretary.

== Mario's Restaurant ==
A fictional restaurant appearing in several novels, including Bill the Conqueror, Summer Lightning, and Big Money. Mario's was inspired by the Café de Paris. According to Richard Usborne, Bill the Conqueror was Wodehouse's first novel to feature Mario's Restaurant, "where Society dines and has fracas and where – as at the old Café de Paris – diners downstairs (Must Dress) cannot see the diners upstairs (Needn't Dress) who can see them".

== Market Blandings ==
Market Blandings is a fictional town, being the closest town to Blandings Castle. It is the site of the Emsworth Arms and a host of other hostelries (such as the Beetle and Wedge, the Blue Boar, the Blue Cow, the Blue Dragon, the Cow and Grasshopper, the Goat and Feathers, the Goose and Gander, the Jolly Cricketers, the Stitch in Time, the Wheatsheaf, and the Waggoner's Rest), as well as a useful railway station, from where a fast train can get you to Paddington in under four hours.

A sleepy old place, Market Blandings is one of England's most picturesque towns, and has an air of having been the same for centuries; the lichened church has a four-square tower, the shops red roofs, and the upper floors of the inns bulge comfortably outward. The most modern thing there is the moving-picture house, which calls itself an "Electric Theatre", is covered in ivy and features stone gables; the only other up-to-date location is the shop of Jno. Banks, hairdresser. The only taxi cab in town is the station taxi, driven by Mr Jno. Robinson; the chemist's is run by a Mr Bulstrode.

== Market Snodsbury ==
Market Snodsbury is a fictional town, about two miles from Brinkley Court and near Droitwich. It is at the Market Snodsbury Grammar School that, in Right Ho, Jeeves, Gussie Fink-Nottle gives his immortal drunken prize-giving speech. Market Snodsbury is also home to an inn called the Bull and Bush, which is praised highly in the Automobile Guide and to which Aubrey Upjohn went to stay in Jeeves in the Offing.

== Marling Hall ==
A fictional house in the neighbourhood of Blandings Castle, Marling is the home of Colonel Fanshawe, his wife and their attractive daughter Valerie. The butler there is a friend of Beach, and the two of them occasionally share a glass or two in the evenings. The house's coal cellar has, on at least one occasion, served as a makeshift prison.

== Marvis Bay ==
Marvis Bay is a fictional coastal resort, with smooth firm sands and a long pier at the northern end of the beach, which provides fishing. The Beach View Hotel lies just by the beach, and the Beach Theatre is not far away. Marvis is described as a quiet seaside spot, in contrast to the excitements of Roville.

The beach is the main setting for the events of "Deep Waters" and "Fixing it for Freddie", while Marvis Bay Golf and Country Club has a charming links and a comfortable clubhouse, from where the club's Oldest Member dispenses his wisdom in the form of his inexhaustible golf stories.

Marvis Bay is variously reported to lie in Dorsetshire ("Fixing it for Freddie") and Cornwall (Uneasy Money).

== Matchingham Hall ==
Matchingham Hall is a fictional location, being the seat of Sir Gregory Parsloe-Parsloe. The hall neighbours Blandings Castle and lies near the village of Much Matchingham. In its grounds resides the "Pride of Matchingham", Sir Gregory's pig and rival to Lord Emsworth's mighty Empress of Blandings, and later the "Queen of Matchingham", replacement for the Pride. The telephone number there is Matchingham 8-3.

== Mervo ==
A small fictional Mediterranean island, Mervo is the smallest independent state in the world, smaller even than Monaco. It is mentioned that "Jason went there in search of the Golden Fleece", which would place Mervo in the northern Aegean Sea. It is a sleepy little place, with an army of one hundred and fifteen, a small harbour, a small town and a few scattered fishing hamlets. The last prince, Charles, was driven out in 1886, when the place became a republic, but when Mervo is purchased by Benjamin Scobell in order to build a casino and resort, in The Prince and Betty, John Maude is revealed to be heir to the princedom.

== Much Matchingham ==
The fictional village adjacent to Matchingham Hall. "Beefy" Bingham inhabits the Vicarage there, the living being in the grant of Lord Emsworth, and his dog Bottles is well known from the Blue Boar on the High Street to the distant Cow and Caterpillar on the Shrewsbury Road.

== Much Middlefold ==
A fictional village located in Shropshire, similar in name to the real town Much Wenlock. It is the home of cricket enthusiast Joan Romney in five short stories published between 1905 and 1909, of Wilmot "Motty", Lord Pershore, in "Jeeves and the Unbidden Guest", and of Bruce Carmyle in The Adventures of Sally. It is also the birthplace of Jeremy Garnet in Love Among the Chickens (spelled Much Middleford in some editions), Ashe Marson in Something Fresh, and Sally Fitch in Bachelors Anonymous. Psmith is from Corfby Hall, near Much Middleford, in Leave it to Psmith. Much-Middlefold-on-the-Hill and Lesser-Middlefold-in-the-Vale are located near Beckford College in A Prefect's Uncle. The prefect of the title, Alan Gethryn, is recruited to play cricket for Much Middlefold in the Joan Romney story "Personally Conducted".

== New Asiatic Bank ==
A fictional organisation, the austere and serious New Asiatic is run by John Bickersdyke. Former employees include Mike Jackson and Psmith, employed there for a spell in Psmith in the City. It has the atmosphere of a public school, with the heads of department as autocratic as masters - the Postage Dept. is run by Mr Rossiter, the Cash Dept. by Mr Waller, and the Fixed Deposits Department by a Mr Gregory. The London branch is seen as something of a training ground for new blood - once a period of probation has been completed, most employees head out East.

At some point, the bank was successfully robbed of around two million dollars' worth of transferable bonds, by a man by the name of Edward Finglass, a friend of Alexander "Chimp" Twist and Thomas "Soapy" Molloy; though Finglass escaped, his haul was eventually recovered, thanks to Sam Shotter, in Sam the Sudden. On another occasion, a Mr John Benyon robbed the bank of $100,000, according to a story in The Man with Two Left Feet.

The bank is perhaps inspired by the Hong Kong and Shanghai Bank, where Wodehouse himself worked for a time before his writing career took off, and is mentioned in passing in many other stories and novels. It is described in the chapter 4 of Psmith in the City that the London branch of the New Asiatic Bank is situated somewhere around the Mansion House and Queen Victoria St in the City of London.

== Pelican Club ==
A riotous gentlemen's club back in the 1890s, the Pelican was that era's equivalent to the Drones. Galahad Threepwood and Uncle Fred were both prominent and popular members; others include "Dogface" Weeks, champion liar, and Galahad's friends "Plug" Basham and "Puffy" Benger. The club was a real gentlemen's club of the era from 1887–1892.

== Pen and Ink Club ==
The Pen and Ink Club is a fictional club for writers referenced in several stories, including the 1916 novel Uneasy Money (chapter 2) and the 1961 novel Ice in the Bedroom (chapter 10), as well as the short story "Mr Potter Takes a Rest Cure". Ukridge's Aunt Julia is president of the club, and it is featured in several Ukridge stories such as "Ukridge Sees Her Through". Rosie M. Banks appears to be a member, since she attends the club's annual dinner in the Drones Club story "Leave it to Algy".

Wodehouse may have drawn inspiration for the club from the Authors' Club, since he played cricket for its associated cricket team, the Authors XI. According to Wodehouse scholar Norman Murphy, the writers association PEN International may have been a source of inspiration for the club. Wodehouse references this organization in his 1971 novel The Girl in Blue, in which amateur poet Homer Pyle attends a PEN conference in Brussels. The first PEN Club was founded in London in 1921; the Pen and Ink Club debuted before this in Uneasy Money but is developed further in later appearances.

== Roville-sur-Mer ==
Roville-sur-Mer is a fictional resort in Northern France, 'in Picardy' (French Leave) and the setting of the likes of The Adventures of Sally and French Leave; the name, however, is reminiscent of Deauville and Boulogne-sur-Mer, on the Channel.

It first appeared in two of the short stories collected in the book The Man Upstairs, published in the U.K. in 1914: Ruth in Exile and The Tuppenny Millionaire. It also appears in the short story, "Aunt Agatha Takes the Count" (in The Inimitable Jeeves).

== Rowcester Abbey ==
Rowcester Abbey is the fictional 147-room home of impoverished aristocrat Bill Belfry, Lord Rowcester. The abbey is the setting for the novel Ring for Jeeves. The abbey dates as far back as the thirteenth century, around the time of Sir Caradoc Belfry, with fifteenth century and Tudor additions, and is alleged to be haunted by the ghost of Lady Agatha, who was Sir Caradoc Belfry's spouse. In the 1950s, the house has fallen into disrepair. Bill manages to sell the house to Rosalinda Spottsworth, who planned to take it down and reconstruct it in California.

Rowcester Abbey is located in the fictional county of Southmoltonshire, though in early editions it was the real Northamptonshire. The name was apparently changed due to a complaint from the Chief Constable of Northamptonshire over objections to one of the novel's characters, Colonel Wyvern.

== Sanstead House ==
Sanstead is a fictional school, setting for much of the action in The Little Nugget. An imposing Georgian building in around 9 acres (36,000 m^{2}) of land, Sanstead was formerly the private home of a family called Boone, but when the family's fortunes declined and the house became too large and expensive to maintain, one Colonel Boone keenly leased the place out as a school.

The place is perfect for the purpose, with ample grounds for cricket and football, and plenty of rooms of various sizes ideal for classrooms and dormitories. Its stables, with their thick walls and iron-barred windows, have been put to use as a gymnasium, carpenter's shop and general storage area, but also make a handy fortress in event of a siege. It is two miles (3 km) from the village, where the principal watering-hole is the Feathers, the barmaid of which, a Miss Benjafield, is a stately type who disapproves of Americans.

Run by the somewhat ineffectual Arnold Abney, Sanstead's staff includes the gloomy teacher Mr Glossop, White the smooth mannered butler, and Mrs Attwell the Matron, as well as a cook, an odd-job-man, two housemaids, a scullery-maid and a parlour-maid, before it is enhanced by the arrival of Peter Burns. The boys, who number some twenty-four in total, include Augustus Beckford, are augmented by the Nugget himself, Ogden Ford, who brings all manner of drama and bad behaviour to the school.

== Sedleigh ==
A fictional, very minor school, which achieves some cricketing success thanks to the arrival of Mike Jackson and Psmith, in Mike and Psmith. Set in pretty countryside, the school has some two hundred boys. The houses, a row of three, lie across the cricket field from the main school; Outwood's, of which Mike and Psmith become members, is the middle one.

The school has a thriving archaeological society, thanks to Outwood, and also a fire brigade, run by his colleague Downing but treated as an excuse to mess around by the boys. The drainpipes are sturdy, and there is a fire bell, in an archway near the school, which proves useful to Mike on one occasion; when it is rung, the boys get to flee the building via canvas chutes.

== Senior Conservative Club ==
A fictional gentlemen's club, the Senior Conservative Club is staid and old-fashioned. The Senior Conservative is a calm and quiet place with discreet staff and excellent dining. Opposite the wide windows of the lower smoking-room is an excellent flower shop, and there are Victorian Turkish baths (based on Nevill's Charing Cross branch) not twenty-five yards from the doors, in Cumberland Street (based on Northumberland Avenue).

Its numbers (increasing from three thousand, seven hundred and eighteen at the time of Psmith in the City to six thousand, one hundred and eleven by the time of Leave it to Psmith) are all respectable, mostly bald men, who look like they could be politicians or important figures in the City; they include Lord Emsworth, who joined as a country member in 1888, and Psmith, put up for the club by his father.

It was based on the Constitutional Club, a London club which has since been dissolved. Wodehouse was a member of a number of London and New York clubs at various times, including the Constitutional Club.

== Senior Liberal Club ==
A fictional gentlemen's club, the Senior Liberal Club is where Bertie Wooster and Bingo Little dine while the Drones Club is closed for cleaning in "Bingo and the Little Woman" (in The Inimitable Jeeves).

== St. Austin's ==
A fictional public school, setting of several early shorts (many of them collected in Tales of St. Austin's), as well as Wodehouse's first published novel The Pothunters. In the Jeeves short story "The Ordeal of Young Tuppy", it is revealed that Tuppy Glossop is an Old Austinian.

== Steeple Bumpleigh ==
Steeple Bumpleigh is a fictional location, being a small village in rural Hampshire and the location of Bumpleigh Hall. It is near the market town of East Wibley, where a fancy dress dance is held in Joy in the Morning. In Much Obliged, Jeeves, Bertie states that Steeple Bumpleigh is in Essex instead, perhaps because of the real Steeple Bumpstead.

== Tilbury House ==
The fictional home of the Mammoth Publishing Company lies on Tilbury Lane near Fleet Street, a narrow lane that smells somewhat of cabbage. The Mammoth's premises spill out from the main HQ at Tilbury House to various other buildings in the street. For a time, opposite Tilbury House on the fourth floor are the offices of J. Sheringham Adair, Detective, also known as Alexander "Chimp" Twist.

== Totleigh Towers ==
Totleigh Towers is a fictional location in two Jeeves stories, being the setting of The Code of the Woosters and Stiff Upper Lip, Jeeves. The country house of Sir Watkyn Bassett, Totleigh Towers is located in Totleigh-in-the-Wold, Gloucestershire. Sir Watkyn's daughter Madeline Bassett also resides there. The butler at Totleigh is Butterfield.

The house is initially the residence of Sir Watkyn's niece and ward Stiffy Byng, and is frequently visited by Sir Watkyn's friend Roderick Spode. When he first appears in the stories, Harold Pinker is the curate of Totleigh-in-the-Wold. Constable Oates is the local police officer.

In the television series Jeeves and Wooster, Totleigh Towers was filmed at Highclere Castle. Totleigh Towers plays a larger role in the television series than in the original Jeeves canon, as it is used as a setting more frequently. In the television series, Totleigh is used as the setting for episodes adapting some of the events of "Jeeves Takes Charge", The Mating Season, and Much Obliged, Jeeves, though these stories originally had different settings (Easeby Hall, Deverill Hall, and Brinkley Court, respectively).

== Twing Hall ==
Twing Hall is the fictional Gloucestershire home of Lord Wickhammersley in "The Great Sermon Handicap", "The Purity of the Turf", and "The Metropolitan Touch".

== Valley Fields ==
A fictional suburb in London. Valley Fields is one of London's quiet, leafy suburbs, in the SE21 postal district. The setting of much of Sam the Sudden, it is home to Matthew Wrenn, whose friend Mr Cornelius is the local estate agent and historian; he has many a tale to tell of the suburb, the most exciting being that of Edward "Finky" Finglass, the notorious bank robber, who lived for a time in the house later inhabited by Sam Shotter.

In Uncle Fred in the Springtime, we learn that part of the suburb was formed from the old estate of Lord Ickenham's Uncle Willoughby, known as Mitching Hill, setting of the drama related in "Uncle Fred Flits By". It is also home to Maudie, niece of Blandings Castle butler Beach.

The suburb is a setting in many non-series novels, including Ice in the Bedroom, which has a similar plot to that of Sam the Sudden. In the preface to the 1972 edition of Sam the Sudden, Wodehouse wrote: "It was the first thing of mine where the action took place in the delectable suburb of Valley Fields, a thin disguise for the Dulwich where so many of my happiest hours have been spent." In his youth, Wodehouse attended Dulwich College in the London suburb of West Dulwich.

In Big Money, Berry Conway, friend of Lord Biskerton, lives with his childhood nurse at 'The Nook, Mulberry Grove, Valley Fields, SE21'. He passes through Herne Hill and Brixton on his way to work so Valley Fields Station is analogous to West Dulwich railway station.

== Wee Nooke ==
The name Wee Nooke was given to two different fictional cottages that Bertie Wooster stays in. The first Wee Nooke, located in Steeple Bumpleigh, appeared in Joy in the Morning, though this cottage was destroyed by Edwin Craye. The second Wee Nooke, located in the town of Maiden Eggesford, appears in Aunts Aren't Gentlemen.

== Wrykyn ==
A fictional minor public school with a strong cricketing tradition, Wrykyn is most closely associated with Mike Jackson, hero of Mike at Wrykyn. It also features in the earlier school novels The Gold Bat and The White Feather, as well as a number of early school shorts.

The school is an imposing place, especially to new boys; the grounds are in the form of a series of terraces cut from a hill, with the school at the top, training grounds on the next step and on the next the cricket field, from the pavilion of which one can see three counties. The houses are run by the likes of Wain, Donaldson and Seymour, and the school's reputation for cricket is fearsome. The public schools "Geddington" and "Ripton" are sporting rivals.

Many characters in later works are old boys, including Ukridge and his friends James Corcoran, George Tupper, and "Looney" Coote, as well as other characters like Sam "The Sudden" Shotter and his friend Willoughby Braddock.

== See also ==
- List of P. G. Wodehouse characters

== Bibliography ==
- Cawthorne, Nigel (2013). A Brief Guide to Jeeves and Wooster. London: Constable & Robinson. ISBN 978-1-78033-824-8.
- Murphy, N. T. P. (2015). The P. G. Wodehouse Miscellany. Stroud, Gloucestershire: The History Press. ISBN 978-0750959643.
- Ring, Tony; Jaggard, Geoffrey (1999). Wodehouse in Woostershire. Chippenham: Porpoise Books. ISBN 1-870-304-19-5.
- Ring, Tony; Jaggard, Geoffrey (2000). Wodehouse with Old Friends. Chippenham: Porpoise Books. ISBN 1-870-304-20-9.
- Usborne, Richard (2003). Plum Sauce: A P. G. Wodehouse Companion. New York: The Overlook Press. ISBN 1-58567-441-9.
- Wodehouse, P. G. (2008) [1923]. The Inimitable Jeeves (Reprinted ed.). London: Arrow Books. ISBN 978-0099513681.
- Wodehouse, P. G. (2008) [1934]. Thank You, Jeeves (Reprinted ed.). London: Arrow Books. ISBN 978-0099513735.
- Wodehouse, P. G. (2008) [1934]. Right Ho, Jeeves (Reprinted ed.). London: Arrow Books. ISBN 978-0099513742.
- Wodehouse, P. G. (2008) [1938]. The Code of the Woosters (Reprinted ed.). London: Arrow Books. ISBN 978-0099513759.
- Wodehouse, P. G. (2008) [1954]. Jeeves and the Feudal Spirit (Reprinted ed.). London: Arrow Books. ISBN 978-0099513933.
- Wodehouse, P. G. (2008) [1971]. Much Obliged, Jeeves (Reprinted ed.). London: Arrow Books. ISBN 978-0099513964.
