= Psmith, Journalist =

1915 novel by P. G. Wodehouse

- First edition
- Author: P. G. Wodehouse
- Language: English
- Genre: Comic novel
- Publisher: A & C Black
- Publication date: 29 September 1915
- Publication place: United Kingdom
- Media type: Print (hardback & paperback)
- Preceded by: Psmith in the City
- Followed by: Leave it to Psmith

Psmith, Journalist is a novel by P. G. Wodehouse, first released in the United Kingdom as a serial in The Captain magazine between October 1909 and February 1910, and published in book form in the UK on 29 September 1915, by Adam & Charles Black, London, and, from imported sheets, by Macmillan, New York, later that year.

The story was also incorporated into the US version of The Prince and Betty, published by W.J. Watt and Co., New York, on 14 February 1912. This combined the magazine versions of The Prince and Betty and Psmith, Journalist, and is a very different book from that published as The Prince and Betty in the UK.

It continues the adventures of the silver-tongued Psmith, one of Wodehouse's best loved characters, and his friend Mike Jackson.

== Plot introduction ==
The story begins with Psmith accompanying his fellow Cambridge student Mike to New York on a cricketing tour. Through high spirits and force of personality, Psmith takes charge of a minor periodical, and becomes embroiled in a scandal involving slum landlords, boxing and gangsters – the story displays a strong social conscience, rare in Wodehouse's generally light-hearted works.

== Plot summary ==
Mr Wilberfloss, editor of Cosy Moments magazine, is forced by ill-health to go away to the mountains for ten weeks of rest, leaving his subordinate Billy Windsor in charge. Pugsy Maloney, the office boy, brings in a cat he has rescued from some ruffians in the street, which he says belongs to his cousin, gang leader Bat Jarvis.

Psmith, accompanying his friend Mike on a cricketing tour, is complaining that he finds New York a little dull, especially with his companion frequently called on for cricketing duties. They meet Billy Windsor, dining in the same restaurant, when the cat escapes its basket, and Psmith helps soothe an irate waiter. Invited back to his place, there they meet and befriend Bat Jarvis, come to retrieve his cat. Perusing Cosy Moments, Psmith tells Windsor they must sack the current writers and rebuild the paper in a more exciting style, and volunteers to act as unpaid subeditor.

Wandering lost, Mike and Psmith find themselves in "Pleasant Street", a slum neighbourhood. Upset by the poverty they see, Psmith resolves to dedicate the energies of Cosy Moments to the issue. Next day, Mike heads off to Philadelphia, and Psmith arrives at the offices to find them besieged by angry contributors, whom he soothes and takes out to lunch. Returning, he sees Kid Brady, who has been complaining to Windsor that he cannot get a fair chance in the crooked world of New York boxing; they resolve to make the magazine his manager, and use it to boost his career.

They begin work, attacking the owner of the tenements and pushing Kid Brady, amongst other stirring pieces, and are soon visited by a Mr Francis Parker, a well-dressed representative of the tenement owner, who offers them bribes to stop the articles. That night, they are approached by an associate of Bat Jarvis, who tells them a large price is being offered to get rid of the duo, which Jarvis, grateful to them for returning his cat, has turned down. On their way home they are dogged by suspicious types.

Kid Brady, his career now on the up thanks to the paper, has his first big fight and wins handsomely. After the fight, the Cosy Moments boys hire Brady as "fighting editor", to protect them. He is needed soon after, when, in an alley outside the stadium, they are set upon by a gang of thugs. They chase them off, capturing one, a man named Jack Repetto, who reveals he is a member of Spider Reilly's "Three Points" gang. His comrades begin shooting, ruining Psmith's hat, but flee when the police arrive.

Finding the paper's distribution hit by thugs, Psmith realises they must up their game, and plans to use the tenement's rent-collector to track the owner. Pugsy Maloney tells them about an incident at "Shamrock Hall", neutral ground under protection of Bat Jarvis, where Dude Dawson insulted a prominent member of the Three Points' girl and used a crude racial epithet, after which Spider Reilly shot Dawson in the leg. The resulting inter-gang warfare leaves Cosy Moments unpestered for a time, and Psmith and Windsor head off to await the rent-collector in one of the tenement apartments.

The man, named Gooch, arrives, and they are trying to shake his employer's name out of him when Maloney reports the arrival of Spider Reilly, Repetto and other gang members. Sending Maloney to fetch Dude Dawson, Psmith and Windsor repair through a hatch to the roof with the rent-collector, holding out there until gang warfare draws their attackers away. They leave a man guarding the skylight, but Psmith finds a ladder, and they cross it to the next building and escape.

Windsor got the rent-collector to divulge a name, that of Stewart Waring, a candidate for city Alderman and former Commissioner of Buildings. After a pick-pocket nearly makes off with their signed proof of Waring's involvement, Psmith posts it back to the paper. Next day at the office, Brady is forced to leave their service to begin training for a fight, and Psmith hears that Windsor has been arrested for hitting a policeman, who was trying to arrest him as part of a raid on a gambling den. Psmith relates a similar experience, and they realise the gang has used the police to get them out of the way while they search for the paper.

With Brady away training and Windsor in prison for a month, Psmith decides it is time to call in a favour from Bat Jarvis. He takes Mike, returned from his match, to visit the cat-lover. Pretending Mike is an English cat expert, they win Jarvis round, and he and his henchman Long Otto stand guard on the office the following day. Repetto and two other Three Pointers burst in, and are chased off with a warning from Jarvis to leave Cosy Moments alone.

Later, Francis Parker appears again, and persuades Psmith to send Jarvis away so they can talk; a message arrives from Windsor asking Psmith to come help him, and Psmith jumps into a taxi, only to find himself kidnapped at gunpoint by Parker. They drive out into the country, but get a flat tyre; while it is being fixed, Kid Brady comes along, out jogging, and distracts Parker long enough for Psmith to overpower him and escape. Next day, Parker invites Psmith to a meeting with Waring, but Psmith refuses, insisting the great man come to him. He also receives a telegram from Wilberfloss the editor, saying he will return the following day.

Wilberfloss arrives with the old contributors, enraged at the changes in the paper; he threatens to contact the owner, but Psmith reveals that he himself owns the paper, having bought it a month previously. Waring appears, and threatens Psmith, but is forced to give him $5,000 to improve the tenements, plus three to replace his hat; Psmith restores Wilberfloss and the staff of Cosy Moments to their positions, Billy Windsor having been offered his previous job at the paper back at a fine salary.

Some months later, back in rainy Cambridge, Psmith hears that Waring lost his election, and that Kid Brady has won his chance at a title-fight, while Mr Wilberfloss has regained the paper's old subscribers.

== Characters ==
- Psmith, an eccentric English dandy, on vacation from University
  - Mike Jackson, his close friend, a cricketer on tour
- Bat Jarvis, the cat-loving leader of the "Groome Street" gang
  - Long Otto, one of Jarvis' henchmen, a stringy, silent young man
- Spider Reilly, another gang boss, head of the "Three Points" gang
  - Jack Repetto, a thug in Reilly's gang, with hair like Bat Jarvis
- Dude Dawson, head of the "Table Hill" gang, Reilly's main rival
- Mr Gooch, a well-dressed rent-collector of Pleasant Street
  - Stewart Waring, Gooch's employer, a crooked politician and tenement-owner
    - Francis Parker, a well-dressed but sinister crook in a tall-shaped hat
- Kid Brady, a promising light-weight boxer, from Wyoming
  - Jimmy Garvin, boxing champ who the Kid hopes to face someday
  - "Cyclone" Al. Wolmann, a long-armed boxer who takes on the Kid

The staff of Cosy Moments:

- Mr J. Fillken Wilberfloss, editor and guiding spirit of Cosy Moments
- Billy Windsor, sub-editor, who takes over in Wilberfloss' absence
- Mr. Benjamin White, owner of Cosy Moments, away in Europe for some time
- Pugsy Maloney, the office-boy at Cosy Moments, cousin to Bat Jarvis
- Mr Wheeler, the paper's business manager, who has never read an issue
- Luella Granville Waterman, writer of Moments in the Nursery
  - Mr Waterman, her husband, a small round gentleman
- B. Henderson Asher, a man with a face like a walnut, who writes Moments of Mirth
- Reverend Edwin T. Philpotts, a cadaverous-looking man, who writes Moments of Meditation

== Reworkings ==
The book published in the US in February 1912 under the title The Prince and Betty merges the plot of the version which had appeared a month earlier in Ainslee's magazine with the plot of Psmith, Journalist (which at that date had only appeared in The Captain magazine). The first eleven chapters of the book follow the plot of the magazine version, with John Maude and Betty Silver meeting and falling out in Mervo. From chapter twelve onwards the story mirrors Psmith, Journalist, with some changes.

Psmith becomes Rupert Smith, a Harvard alumnus (Psmith's first name is Rupert in Mike and Psmith in the City; it is not mentioned in Psmith, Journalist, and has changed to Ronald for his next appearance), although he retains Psmith's characteristic monocle, mode of speech and habit of referring to all and sundry as "Comrade". Smith is acting editor of the magazine, here renamed Peaceful Moments, edited by a Mr Renshaw and owned by Mr Benjamin Scobell. John Maude is an old friend of Smith; the paper hires Betty as secretary, and their love-hate relationship carries on from the first part of the story. The affairs of boxer Kid Brady, boosted by Smith, gangster Bat Jarvis, befriended by Betty, and the tenement scandal, taken up by Smith at Betty's instigation, are intermingled with the romance of Maude and Betty.

The two books were combined and rewritten once more, and released as a serial under the title A Prince for Hire in a periodical called The Illustrated Love Magazine in 1931. The parts were reassembled and published in book form by Galahad Books in 2003.

== Publication history ==
In The Captain magazine, the story was illustrated by T. M. R. Whitwell. The first UK edition of the novel included twelve full page illustrations by Whitwell. The story was included in the 1974 collection The World of Psmith, published by Barrie & Jenkins, London.

One of the earliest known uses in print of the phrase "Elementary, my dear Watson" appeared in Psmith, Journalist. The exact phrase used in the book is "Elementary, my dear Watson, elementary". It appeared in the fourth part of the serial, published in January 1910. A similar phrase, "Elementary, my dear fellow, quite elementary", was used in the previous Psmith novel, Psmith in the City.

== Critical reception ==
On 5 November 2019 BBC News included Psmith, Journalist on its list of the 100 most influential novels.

== See also ==
Mike and Psmith had previously appeared in:

- Mike (1909)
- Psmith in the City (1910)

and returned in:

- Leave it to Psmith (1923).
