= Psmith =

Fictional character in P. G. Wodehouse stories

Rupert (Ronald Eustace) Psmith
- Psmith (left) and Mike Jackson, illustration by T. M. R. Whitwell of The New Fold, published in The Captain (1908)
- First appearance: The Lost Lambs (1908)
- Last appearance: Leave it to Psmith (1923)
- Created by: P. G. Wodehouse
- Portrayed by: Basil Foster (1930); Simon Ward (1981); Daniel Day-Lewis (1981); Nick Caldecott (2008); Edward Bennett (2020)

In-universe information
- Gender: Male
- Occupation: Various
- Nationality: British
- Education: Eton College (expelled); Sedleigh (fictional school); University of Cambridge

Rupert Psmith (or Ronald Eustace Psmith, as he is called in the last of the four books in which he appears) is a recurring fictional character in several novels by British author P. G. Wodehouse, being one of Wodehouse's best-loved characters.

The P in his surname is silent ("as in pshrimp", in his own words) and was added by himself, in order to distinguish him from other Smiths. A member of the Drones Club, Psmith is a monocle-sporting Old Etonian. He is something of a dandy, a fluent and witty speaker, and has the ability to pass through incredible adventures unruffled.

== Origins ==
Wodehouse said that he based Psmith on Rupert D'Oyly Carte (1876–1948), the son of the Gilbert and Sullivan impresario Richard D'Oyly Carte, as he put it "the only thing in my literary career which was handed to me on a silver plate with watercress around it". Carte was a school acquaintance of a cousin of Wodehouse's at Winchester College, according to an introduction to Leave It to Psmith. Rupert's daughter, Bridget D'Oyly Carte, however, believed that the Wykehamist schoolboy described to Wodehouse was not her father but his elder brother Lucas, who was also at Winchester.

Benny Green offers the theory that Psmith was partially based on Henry Hyndman, an eccentric Victorian demagogue who founded the Social Democratic Federation, the first major Marxist political organisation in England. Similarly, Psmith is Wodehouse's most socialist-leaning character, frequently referring to other individuals as 'Comrade'. Hyndman was also known for his fastidious dress and for being an accomplished cricketer in his youth.

== Appearances and names ==
Psmith appears in four novel-length works, all of which appeared as magazine serials before being published in book form.

Original serial appearance			Appearances in book form
Dates	Magazine	Title	Appearances in book form
April–September 1908	The Captain	"The Lost Lambs"	"The Lost Lambs" forms the second half of the novel Mike (1909). (The first half republishes the serial "Jackson Junior", in which Psmith does not appear.) "The Lost Lambs" was later republished separately as: * Enter Psmith (1935) and * Mike and Psmith (1953).
October 1908 – March 1909	The Captain	"The New Fold"	Psmith in the City (1910)
October 1909 – March 1910	The Captain	"Psmith, Journalist"	Psmith, Journalist (1915) * Parts of this serialised story were rewritten and incorporated into a novel for an American audience, published in the US as The Prince and Betty (1912). This rewritten story does not feature Psmith, but does include a similar character named "Smith".
February–March 1923	The Saturday Evening Post	"Leave It to Psmith"	Leave It to Psmith (1923) * The ending of this serialized story was rewritten for book publication, and differs significantly from the magazine version.

All these works also feature Mike Jackson, Psmith's solid, cricket-playing friend and sidekick, the original hero and central character of Mike and Psmith in the City until he was eclipsed by Psmith's wit and force of personality.

In his first appearance (in Mike, Enter Psmith or Mike and Psmith, depending on edition) Psmith introduces himself as Rupert. He is also referred to as Rupert twice in Psmith in the City.

In Leave it to Psmith, however, he introduces himself as Ronald Eustace. This is perhaps because Leave it to Psmith contains another character named Rupert, the efficient Baxter; Wodehouse presumably thought having two Ruperts would be confusing for readers, and since Psmith is generally referred to by his surname only, Wodehouse may have assumed that the change would go largely unnoticed.

In the United States version of The Prince and Betty, essentially a reworking of Psmith, Journalist that's been relocated to New York City and merged with some elements of the United Kingdom version, the Psmith character is replaced by Rupert Smith, an American and alumnus of Harvard who retains many of Psmith's characteristics, including the monocle. A Prince for Hire is another blending of these stories.

Leave It to Psmith differs somewhat in style from its predecessors. While Mike is a school story along the lines of much of Wodehouse's early output, and Psmith in the City and Psmith, Journalist are youthful adventures, Psmith's final appearance fits the pattern of Wodehouse's more mature period, a romantic comedy set in the idyllic, invariably imposter-ridden Blandings Castle. Here, Psmith fulfils the role of the ingenious, levelheaded fixer, a part taken elsewhere by the likes of Gally, Uncle Fred, or Jeeves, and finally shows a romantic streak of his own. Though predating both Jeeves and Uncle Fred by some years, Psmith seems to be a combination of both characters, on the one hand imbued with Jeeves' precision of speech and concern for being well turned out, and on the other hand expressing Uncle Fred's humorous self-expression and insouciant attitude.

== Life and character ==
We first meet Psmith shortly after he has been expelled from Eton, and sent to Sedleigh, where he meets Mike, and their long friendship begins. He is a tall and thin boy, immaculately dressed, and sports his trademark monocle. His speech is fluid and flowery. Psmith spends much of his time at Sedleigh lounging in deck chairs rather than engaging in physical activity. His most notable talent, even at this age, is a remarkable verbal dexterity, which he uses to confuse boys and masters alike; with his sombre, still face, it is often impossible to tell if he is being serious or not. This skill frequently comes in handy to get himself and his friends out of difficulty. In such circumstances, he is known to move fairly quickly too.

The Psmith name, he admits from the start, is one he has adopted that morning, as there are "too many Smiths". His father, Mr Smith, is a fairly wealthy man, although a little eccentric, who lives at Corfby Hall, Lower Benford, in Shropshire, not far from Crofton where his friend Mike grew up; he later moves to Ilsworth Hall, in a "neighbouring county", mostly to find better cricket.

While at Eton, he was a competent cricketer, on the verge of the first team – a slow left-arm bowler with a swerve, his enormous reach also makes him handy with a bat when some fast hitting is required, such as in the match between Sedleigh and Wrykyn at the climax of Mike and Psmith.

After Sedleigh, Psmith goes to work at the New Asiatic Bank, having annoyed his father's schoolfriend John Bickersdyke. After a time there, he persuades his father to let him study to become a lawyer, and goes to Cambridge, accompanied by Mike.

During the summer after their first year, Psmith travels to New York, accompanying Mike, who is on a cricketing tour with the M.C.C. There, he gets involved with the magazine Cosy Moments, befriending its temporary editor Billy Windsor and helping in its crusade against slum housing, which involves clashes with violent gangsters. We discover in the last chapter, when the head editor returns, that Psmith has persuaded his father to let him invest some money he has inherited from an uncle and now owns the magazine.

After university, his father dies, having made some unsound investments. As a result, Psmith must work for a time for an uncle in the fish business, something which repels him. He leaves the job shortly before meeting and falling for Eve Halliday, whom he follows to Blandings Castle. Despite having entered the castle claiming to be Canadian poet Ralston McTodd, he is eventually hired as secretary to Lord Emsworth, who knew his father by reputation, and is engaged to Eve Halliday.

In a preface to the 1953 version of Mike and Psmith, Wodehouse informs us that Psmith went on to become a successful defence lawyer, in the style of Perry Mason. In his introduction to the omnibus The World of Psmith (1974), Wodehouse suggests that Psmith eventually became a judge.

Psmith is a principled young man – although his principles can sometimes be eccentric – and is generous towards those he likes. In a typical example from Leave it to Psmith, he perceives Eve, trapped by the rain under an awning, and decides, as a chivalrous gentleman, to get her an umbrella, which he does not possess. He solves this problem by appropriating one, and when confronted by the owner, Psmith attempts to mollify him by saying it is for a good cause; and he later recounts it as: "Merely practical Socialism. Other people are content to talk about the Redistribution of Property. I go out and do it." (Another of Psmith's quirks is his penchant for nominal socialism, observed mostly in his casual use of "Comrade" as a substitute for "Mister.")

== Adaptations ==
In the 1930 play Leave It to Psmith adapted from the novel by Wodehouse and Ian Hay, Psmith was portrayed by Basil Foster, with Jane Baxter as Eve Halliday. The 1933 film based on the play, Leave It to Me, replaced Psmith with a different character, Sebastian Help, who was portrayed by Gene Gerrard, with Molly Lamont as Eve Halliday.

Simon Ward voiced Psmith, with Caroline Langrishe as Eve Halliday, in the radio adaptation of Leave it to Psmith dramatised by Michael Bakewell, which aired on BBC Radio 4 on 3 October 1981.

Psmith was portrayed by Daniel Day-Lewis in the BBC television film Thank You, P. G. Wodehouse. The film aired on 16 October 1981.

In the BBC radio adaptation of Psmith in the City dramatised by Marcy Kahan, which first aired in four parts in 2008, Nick Caldecott voiced Psmith, with Inam Mirza as Mike Jackson.

Edward Bennett played Psmith in the 2020 BBC radio dramatisation of Leave it to Psmith, with Susannah Fielding as Eve and Ifan Meredith as Mike Jackson.

== See also ==
- A list of characters involved in Psmith's adventures
