= Lady Florence Craye Arrives in New York =

- Jeeves and Wooster episode
- Episode no.: Season 4 Episode 2
- Directed by: Ferdinand Fairfax
- Original air date: 23 May 1993

Episode chronology
← Previous "Return to New York"	Next → "Honoria Glossop Turns Up"

"Lady Florence Craye Arrives in New York" is the second episode of the fourth series of the 1990s British comedy television series Jeeves and Wooster. It is also called "The Once and Future Ex" and was first aired in the UK on 23 May 1993 on ITV.

In the US, it was one of five episodes of Jeeves and Wooster that were not aired as part of the original broadcast of the television series on Masterpiece Theatre. Nevertheless, all episodes were made available on US home video releases. "Chuffy" aired as the second episode of the fourth series of Jeeves and Wooster instead.

== Background ==
Adapted from Joy in the Morning.

== Cast ==
- Bertie Wooster – Hugh Laurie
- Jeeves – Stephen Fry
- Stilton Cheesewright – Nicholas Palliser
- Florence Craye – Francesca Folan
- George Caffyn – Nigel Whitmey
- Zenobia "Nobby" Hopwood – Jennifer Gibson
- Lord Worplesdon – Frederick Treves
- Chichester Clam – John Cater
- Corrigan – Sam Douglas
- Liftman Coneybear – Joseph Mydell
- Secretary – Thomasine Heiner

== Plot ==
Bertie bumps into his former fiancée Lady Florence in a bookshop while buying a birthday present for Jeeves. But after a row with her present suitor, the insanely jealous D'Arcy "Stilton" Cheesewright she renews her engagement to Bertie. Friend George Caffyn needs $50,000 for his play but can only get it from Chichester Clam when he sells his boats to Lord Worplesdon, but the press pack haunting them is stopping the deal from going through. Jeeves sees a fancy dress party as a way of sorting everything out.

== See also ==
- List of Jeeves and Wooster characters
