= Mike Jackson (character) =

Fictional character in P. G. Wodehouse stories

Mike Jackson playing cricket, illustrated by T. M. R. Whitwell (1907)

Mike Jackson is a recurring fictional character in the early novels by British comic writer P. G. Wodehouse, being a good friend of Psmith. He appears in all the Psmith books.

== Overview ==
Mike is a solid, reliable character with a strong sense of fair play, but an appetite for excitement and a stubbornness that often leads him into trouble. He is a keen and talented cricketer, and comes from a cricketing family (his elder brothers have all distinguished themselves), and as we follow Mike's life he himself achieves considerable cricketing success. However, as Wodehouse's writing developed away from the school stories of his early period, cricket becomes a less important aspect of the tales, as does Mike himself.

== Appearances ==
Mike Jackson appears in five novel-length works, all of which appeared as magazine serials before being published in book form.

Original serial appearance			Appearances in book form
Dates	Magazine	Title	Appearances in book form
April–September 1907	The Captain	"Jackson Junior"	"Jackson Junior" forms the first half of the novel Mike (1909). "Jackson Junior" was later republished separately as Mike at Wrykyn (1953).
April–September 1908	The Captain	"The Lost Lambs"	"The Lost Lambs" forms the second half of the novel Mike (1909). "The Lost Lambs" was later republished separately as: * Enter Psmith (1935) and * Mike and Psmith (1953).
October 1908-March 1909	The Captain	"The New Fold"	Psmith in the City (1910)
October 1909-March 1910	The Captain	"Psmith, Journalist"	Psmith, Journalist (1915) * Note that parts of this serialised story were rewritten and incorporated into a novel for an American audience, published in the US as The Prince and Betty (1912). This rewritten story does not feature Mike Jackson or Psmith.
February–March, 1923	The Saturday Evening Post	"Leave It to Psmith"	Leave It to Psmith (1923) * Note that the ending of this serialized story was rewritten for book publication, and differs significantly from the magazine version.

In his first appearance ("Jackson Junior", later retitled Mike at Wrykyn) Mike is the sole focus of the story. Mike at Wrykyn starts with Mike heading off to prestigious Wrykyn school, where all his brothers had attended and one, Bob, is still an important figure, and a fixture in the school cricket team. Mike goes through many adventures, interspersed with cricket, during his first year at the school.

In "The Lost Lambs" (later known as Mike and Psmith or Enter Psmith), Mike is withdrawn from Wrykyn by his father after a poor academic performance, and must attend the less successful Sedleigh, much to his disgust. It is there, however, that he meets the charismatic Rupert Psmith, and the two become fast friends.

In "The New Fold" (later published as Psmith in the City), family financial troubles mean Mike cannot go to Cambridge as he had hoped, and must instead get a job at the (fictitious) New Asiatic Bank. Once there, however, he finds his friend Psmith also enrolled in the company, making his time there much more pleasurable.

In Psmith, Journalist, Mike, now enjoying success as a Cambridge cricketer, travels to the United States for a cricket tour. His friend Psmith comes along with him, and embroils the two in a dangerous adventure; by now, however, Mike has become a minor character, in the shadow of voluble Psmith.

In Leave It to Psmith, Mike only appears briefly early on; he is married to Phyllis, stepdaughter of Joseph Keeble, who is in turn married to Lord Emsworth's sister Lady Constance Keeble. Psmith falls for Phyllis' friend Eve Halliday, and the two strive to help out their impoverished friends.

== Fictional biography ==
Mike's family appear in the early stories, and we learn that he has four brothers, one of them (Bob, three years older than Mike) in the Wrykyn cricket team, the other three (Joe, Reggie and Frank) all county players. He also has four younger sisters, Marjory (a year Mike's junior), Phyllis, Ella, and Gladys Maud Evangeline (the baby), and an Uncle John. His kindly father, who has business interests in the Argentine, employs a cricket pro, a loyal man named Saunders, to train his boys during the holidays. Their house is at Crofton, in Shropshire, where they keep a bulldog named John, Mike's inseparable companion during the holidays.

Mike's early schooling was at a private school named "King-Hall's", at Emsworth in Hampshire; he made seven centuries there in his last year, including one knock of 123. At the age of fifteen, a place is found for him at Wrykyn, where his brothers before him had attended.

His huge self-confidence and skill in batting bring him much success at Wrykyn, and his noble character makes him many friends. After three happy years there, as he is on the verge of taking over the captaincy of the cricket team, he is forced, thanks to poor academic work, to leave Wrykyn. He goes to Sedleigh, a lesser school which he resents, but it is there that he meets Psmith, with whom he would form a lasting friendship.

His first months at Sedleigh demonstrate his obstinate nature; unable to play for Wrykyn, he refuses to play for a lesser school, missing much cricket, although he does manage a few games for a local village side. Generally good-natured, Mike has a sharp temper at times, especially when he sees some injustice done to himself or a friend; he is invariably generous and helpful to friends in need. He also gets on well with dogs.

After Sedleigh, Mike learns that his father's finances have taken a bit of a tumble, and rather than go to Cambridge, he will have to go to work at the New Asiatic Bank. He spends several months there, despite an early run-in with his employer John Bickersdyke, made more comfortable by the presence of Psmith on the scene, and eventually succumbs to the lure of sunshine and cricket, leaving his job to join his brother Joe in a match at Lord's. Psmith's father Mr Smith, seeing Mike's talent, decides to hire him as estate manager, paying for him to study at Cambridge first.

During his first year there he makes a century against Oxford, and in the summer break he joins an M.C.C. team on a tour of America

After university, Mike takes up his job with Psmith's father, and marries Phyllis. Unfortunately, old man Smith dies, leaving nothing but debts, and the people who buy his property have someone else to manage the estate, leaving Mike in difficulty. He finds temporary work as a schoolmaster, and has offered a farming business in Lincolnshire, but requires financial help from Joe Keeble.

In a preface to the 1953 version of Mike and Psmith, Wodehouse informs us that Mike would go on to become a prosperous farmer.
