= Mike (novel) =

1909 novel by P. G. Wodehouse

- First edition
- Author: P. G. Wodehouse
- Language: English
- Genre: School story
- Publisher: A & C Black
- Publication date: 15 September 1909
- Publication place: United Kingdom
- Media type: Print (hardcover and paperback)
- Followed by: Psmith in the City
- Text: Mike at Wikisource

Mike is a school story by P. G. Wodehouse, first published on 15 September 1909 by Adam & Charles Black, London. The story first appeared in the magazine The Captain, in two separate parts that were collected together in the original version of the book; the first part, originally called Jackson Junior, was republished in 1953 under the title Mike at Wrykyn, while the second half, called The Lost Lambs in its serialised version, was released as Enter Psmith in 1935 and then as Mike and Psmith in 1953. Although Mike was one of Wodehouse's earlier books, Wodehouse thought it his best work.

== Plot introduction ==
The first half of the story, found in Mike at Wrykyn, introduces Michael "Mike" Jackson. Mike is the youngest son of a renowned cricketing family. Mike's eldest brother Joe is a successful first-class player, while another brother, Bob, is on the verge of his school team. When Mike arrives at Wrykyn himself, his cricketing talent and love of adventure bring him success and trouble in equal measure.

The second part, also known as Enter Psmith or Mike and Psmith, takes place two years later. Mike, due to poor academic reports, is withdrawn from Wrykyn by his father and sent to a smaller school called Sedleigh. On arrival at Sedleigh, he meets the eccentric Rupert Psmith, another new arrival who has arrived from Eton. The two become friends and decide not to play cricket, instead participating in other school activities.

== Plot summary ==
=== Part 1: "Mike at Wrykyn", or, "Jackson Junior" ===
Mike is leaving his private school to go to Wrykyn. His sisters hope that he will get into the school team his first year, although his brother Bob and Saunders, the pro, are sceptical. On the train down to Wrykyn, Mike is joined by a stranger; seeing the boy get off the train without his bag, Mike throws it out onto the platform, but the boy returns at the next stop. It turns out that the stranger is Firby-Smith, head of Wain's house, which Mike is to join.

Mike meets and befriends Wyatt, Wain's stepson. Wyatt asks Burgess, the cricket captain, to allow Mike to try out; Mike performs well and gets on the third team.

Mike is later allowed to play for the first after Wyatt is involved in a fight between some of the students and a gang from Wrykyn town, which ends up with a policeman being thrown into a pond. The policeman exaggerates the incident to the headmaster, claiming several hundred boys had thrown him into the water, and the headmaster punishes the school by cancelling a forthcoming holiday. In retaliation, Wyatt organises a mass walk-out, taking most of the school with him to a nearby town. As punishment for this, the younger boys are caned, and the older boys are all given "extra" during a cricket match against the M.C.C. As there are now several openings in the team, Wyatt persuades Burgess to let Mike play.

Mike plays well in the M.C.C. match, scoring 23 not out, against a team that includes both Mike's brother Joe and the pro Saunders. However, in a later house match, Firby-Smith runs Mike out, and Mike insults him. Firby-Smith insists that Mike be punished, but Bob persuades him not to. In gratitude, Mike, finding that he has squeezed Bob out of the team, feigns a sprained wrist so that Bob will get into the team instead of him.

Soon after, a boy brings the chicken-pox to the school. The outbreak takes out one of the first-team players, giving Mike another chance; he plays reasonably in a poor game. Bob tells him he thinks the first-team place is now Mike's, but next day Mike again angers Firby-Smith by missing early morning fielding practice for the house. When Burgess hears Firby-Smith's story, he decides to pass Mike over in favour of Bob.

Neville-Smith, a bowler who has taken the other place in the team, plans a party at his house (he is a day boy) in celebration of his placement, and Wyatt sneaks out of school to attend. On his way out he is spotted by a master, who reports it to Wain; the housemaster waits in Mike's room until Wyatt returns, and tells him he is to leave the school at once, to take a job in a bank. Mike takes Wyatt's place in the team, and persuades his father to find Wyatt more interesting work, via his connections in Argentina.

Wrykyn go into the match against their biggest rivals, Ripton, short on bowling but with both Jacksons. The wicket is sticky from rain and Ripton notch up a good score, and taking the field reveal they having a strong bowler of googlies. After a bad start, Wrykyn's fortunes look up when the brothers bat together. Bob gets out, but has given Mike time to settle in; with the tail of the team accompanying him, he deftly collars the bowling, finishing on 83 not out; Wrykyn wins.

=== Part 2: "Mike and Psmith", or, "The Lost Lambs" ===
Mike has been at Wrykyn for another two years and is due to become cricket captain next term, but during the Easter holidays, his father, receiving Mike's poor performance report, removes him from Wrykyn and sends him instead to Sedleigh, a far smaller school.

Arriving at Sedleigh in a bitter mood, he meets Mr Outwood, the head of his house. Mike then meets a well-dressed boy with a monocle, who introduces himself as Psmith. The P in his surname is silent and was added by himself, in order to distinguish him from other Smiths. He is an ex-Etonian whose family lives near Mike's, and, like Mike, is a new boy. They decide to avoid cricket and instead join Mr Outwood's archaeological society.

Having made friends with a boy called Jellicoe, the three take a dormitory together. The next day, they meet Adair, school cricket captain, and house-master Mr Downing, both of whom are disappointed by the new boys' refusal to play cricket. Both Psmith and Mike claim ignorance of cricket, a decision which Mike comes to regret.

Bored by their archaeology trips, they wander off one day, and Mike runs into an old cricketing friend, who offers him a place in a local village team. Mike enjoys the games, but keeps his village cricket career a secret. Mike eventually reveals his cricketing history, and is persuaded to play in an upcoming house match as revenge against Mr Downing, who unfairly favours his own house. The game ends with Mike making 277 not out, and Downing's not getting an innings at all.

Mike agrees to deliver money to a pub owner in Wrykyn town for his roommate, Jellicoe. After discovering that the money was not owed, he returns to Wrykyn, attempts to return to his house, and is chased by Downing. He rings the school fire bell and escapes in the confusion.

The next morning, Sammy, Mr. Downing's dog, turns up covered in red paint. Downing is enraged and proceeds to investigate: he finds that a boy from Outwood's was seen abroad that night, and finds spilled red paint in the bike shed with a footprint in it. He gets Psmith to show him round Outwood's house, searching for boots with red paint on them, and he finds one of Mike's with paint on it. Psmith successfully hides the boot, but does not tell Mike, so Mike ends up wearing shoes to school, attracting Downing's attention.

Meanwhile, Stone and Robinson, not pleased with Adair's proposal to hold an early-morning cricket practice, decide they can safely skip it. Adair has other ideas, and fights Stone, bullying them both into playing. He then visits Mike and invites him to either play or fight. Despite being the better boxer, Adair loses his temper, and loses the fight. Psmith persuades Mike to play, telling him that he also will be playing, revealing that he had been a very good bowler at Eton. Adair sprained a wrist during the fight and is unable to play; the match is rained out. Downing tells the headmaster that he suspects Mike of painting Sammy, but it is found out that it had been done by Dunster, an old student. Mike and Adair arrange a match between Sedleigh and Wrykyn, and Sedleigh wins.

== Characters ==
- Michael "Mike" Jackson, main protagonist. Mike is described as being ordinary at everything except cricket, where he is a "natural genius". He is fifteen years old in the beginning of Part I and eighteen years old in Part II.
- Bob Jackson, Mike's older brother, a prefect at Wrykyn
- Trevor and Clowes, two friends of Bob Jackson, both cricketers
- "Gazeka" Firby-Smith, head of Mike's house at Wrykyn
- Mr Wain, master of Mike's house at Wrykyn
- James Wyatt, Mr Wain's stepson, Mike's roommate
- Burgess, Wrykyn cricket captain
- Neville-Smith, Wrykyn day boy and good bowler
- Rupert Psmith, boy who joins Sedleigh at the same time as Mike
- Mr Outwood, amiable master of Mike's house at Sedleigh
- Spiller, boy in Outwood's, whose study is taken by Psmith and Mike
- Stone, boy in Outwood's
- Robinson, boy in Outwood's, Stone's friend
- Tom Jellicoe, boy in Outwood's house, Mike and Psmith's roommate
- Mr Downing, unpopular master of another house
- Adair, Sedleigh cricket captain
- Dunster, Sedleigh old boy
- Sergeant Collard, school sergeant at Sedleigh

== Related stories ==
Both Mike and Psmith feature in several later novels by Wodehouse:

- Psmith in the City (1910)
- Psmith, Journalist (1915)
- Leave it to Psmith (1923)

Wrykyn school had previously appeared in two novels:

- The Gold Bat (1904)
- The White Feather (1907)

Several short stories are also set at Wrykyn, some of which are listed at List of short stories by P. G. Wodehouse#School stories.

Wodehouse reused the scene with the paint-splashed shoe in Something New (1915): although the setting and characters are different, the scene is essentially the same as in Mike. This scene was omitted from the UK edition, Something Fresh.
