= The Head of Kay's =

1905 novel by P. G. Wodehouse

- First edition
- Author: P. G. Wodehouse
- Language: English
- Publisher: A & C Black
- Publication date: 5 October 1905
- Publication place: United Kingdom
- Media type: Print (hardcover)

The Head of Kay's is a novel by English author P. G. Wodehouse. The novel was published on 5 October 1905 by A & C Black. The Head of Kay's was first published as a serial in The Captain from October 1904 to March 1905.

Set at the fictional public school of Eckleton, the story centres upon one of the school houses called Kay's, the riotous boys therein, its tactless, unpopular master Mr Kay, and Kennedy, who becomes the new head boy. The story features practical jokes, fighting between the boys, burglaries, politics amongst the houses of the school, a trip to an army-style camp, and plenty of cricket, rugby, and other school sports.

== Plot ==
Fenn is the head of Kay's, the most unruly house in Eckleton. He tries to keep order, but is hindered by Mr Kay, who is demanding and critical of Fenn. Fenn is a skilled cricketer and admired by the members of his house for almost single-handedly getting his house's cricket team into the finals of the inter-house cricket cup. Mr Kay is uninterested in the cup and keeps Fenn from playing for part of the final match after Fenn argued with him. This results in a loss for Kay's, which upsets the members of the house. Mr Kay oversees a school concert at the end of the term, and Fenn is one of the performers. He plays a lively song which causes the students, especially the members of Kay's, to loudly stamp their feet, angering Mr Kay. He tries to restore order, but the students continue stamping and abruptly start leaving after Fenn has finished playing. The concert is prematurely brought to an end. The incident increases Mr Kay's disapproval of Fenn. Fenn expects there will be more trouble between him and Mr Kay next term.

During the summer holidays, Fenn plays cricket while his friends Kennedy and Jimmy Silver, who are both members of Blackburn's House, go to an army-style camp. An unpleasant member of Kay's named Walton makes trouble at the camp. They all return to school when the next term starts. Kennedy enjoys being a prefect in Blackburn's House, which is much more unified than Kay's. He is dismayed to learn he has been appointed the head of Kay's in place of Fenn, due to Mr Kay's disapproval of Fenn. The members of Kay's, already disorderly, resent Kennedy taking Fenn's place, and make Kennedy's task of keeping order even harder. Fenn and Kennedy are both irritated by the situation, and they have a falling-out. Walton is the leading troublemaker in Kay's, and Kennedy decides the only way to stop him is by winning a fight against him. They follow the rules of boxing and Jimmy acts as timekeeper, but Walton cheats by injuring Kennedy with an illegal hit. Jimmy tries to stop the fight, but Kennedy perseveres, and defeats Walton. His victory makes Kay's less rebellious, though the house is still as unruly as when Fenn was the head of the house.

Fenn sneaks out to the nearby town's theatre to see a show written by his older brother. Spotting Mr Kay and two other masters in the audience, he tries to return to school unseen, but gets lost. A stranger in town steals his pocket watch and he loses his prefect's cap before he finally makes it back to Eckleton at night. He sees Mr Kay, who is hunting a burglar, and pretends he is also awake because of the burglar. Fenn is concerned about being expelled for going to town without permission if the cap is found, since the cap has his name in it. Jimmy helps Fenn and Kennedy reconcile. Fenn's cap is returned to him by the Headmaster, but he is not in trouble since the cap was found among the objects taken by the burglars, who have been caught. Kennedy and Fenn, now friends again, work together to bring order to their house. Mr Kay leaves the school and a more pleasant schoolmaster, Mr Dencroft, becomes the new housemaster. Under the leadership of Kennedy and Fenn, their house, now called Dencroft's, does much better in sports than before. Dencroft's narrowly loses to Blackburn's in the inter-house rugby cup, but manages to score the most points overall in a series of races and other contests to win the sports' cup. Kennedy remarks that this is the first trophy Dencroft's has won, and Jimmy says that it will not be the last.

== Main characters ==
- Robert Fenn, the head of Kay's House until he is demoted to second prefect
- Kennedy, a student who is initially the second prefect of Blackburn's House but replaces Fenn as the head of Kay's
- Jimmy Silver, the head of Blackburn's House, and the older brother of Billy Silver who is a member of Kay's
- Walton, a belligerent member of Kay's
- Mr Kay, the fussy and ineffective housemaster of Kay's House
- Mr Blackburn, the popular housemaster of Blackburn's House

== Publication history ==
The story was serialised in The Captain in six parts from October 1904 to March 1905, with illustrations by T. M. R. Whitwell.

The original novel included eight of Whitwell's illustrations. The novel also has a short preface by Wodehouse, and has the dedication, "To my father". The American edition was issued from imported sheets by Macmillan, New York in 1922.

The Head of Kay's was included in The Gold Bat and Other Stories, a book published by Penguin Books in 1986 which also contains two other school novels by Wodehouse, The Gold Bat (1904) and The White Feather (1907).
