= Psmith in the City =

1910 novel by P. G. Wodehouse

- First edition
- Author: P. G. Wodehouse
- Language: English
- Genre: Comic novel
- Publisher: A & C Black, London
- Publication date: 23 September 1910
- Publication place: United Kingdom
- Media type: Print (hardcover)
- Preceded by: Mike
- Followed by: Psmith, Journalist

Psmith in the City is a novel by P. G. Wodehouse, first published on 23 September 1910 by Adam & Charles Black, London. The story was originally released as a serial in The Captain magazine, between October 1908 and March 1909, under the title The New Fold.

It continues the adventures of cricket-loving Mike Jackson and his immaculately-dressed friend Psmith, first encountered in Mike (1909).

== Plot introduction ==
Mike Jackson, cricketer and scion of a cricketing clan, finds his dreams of studying and playing at Cambridge upset by news of his father's financial troubles, and must instead take a job with the "New Asiatic Bank". On arrival there, Mike finds his friend Psmith is also a new employee, and together they strive to make the best of their position, and perhaps squeeze in a little cricket from time to time.

== Plot summary ==
Playing cricket for a team run by Psmith's father, Mike meets John Bickersdyke for the first time when he walks behind the bowler's arm, causing Mike to get out on ninety-eight. Shortly afterward, Mike's father regretfully informs him that, having lost a large amount of money, he will have to sell the house, and won't be able to send Mike to Cambridge as he had hoped. Mike hears that Psmith is in the same position, as he is sent off to London.

Mike, feeling very lonely, homesick and sorry for himself, rents a horrid room in Dulwich, and next day presents himself for work at the New Asiatic Bank. He is put to work under Mr Rossiter in the Postage Department, replacing a youth named Bannister, and is befriended by Mr Waller, a kindly employee of the bank, who takes him to lunch; on his return, he is joined by Psmith, also a new employee, in the same department as Mike.

They go for a stroll, and Psmith reveals that he has been placed there on a whim of his father's, having annoyed Bickersdyke while he was staying for the weekend. Mike is worried that their employer has it in for them both and that they are powerless, but Psmith announces he plans to toy with Bickersdyke outside of work, being, like their employer, a member of the Senior Conservative Club. He also insists that Mike move in with him in his flat in Clement's Inn. That night Mike feels much happier for having an ally.

Trying to find a means of pacifying their manager Mr Rossiter, they find out from Bannister that he is a devotee of association football and a fan of Manchester United. For a few weeks Psmith uses this knowledge to ingratiate himself with Rossiter, before moving on to Bickersdyke. He haunts the man at their club, his position in the workplace unassailable thanks to his friendship with Rossiter, and disrupts a political meeting, part of Bickersdyke's campaign to become a member of parliament, turning it into a near-riot. Bickersdyke is angry at Psmith, but powerless.

Psmith continues to cultivate Mr Rossiter, and Mike gets used to his work. After a while, a new man starts, and Mike is moved on to the Cash Department, under Mr Waller. One day, hearing Psmith call Mike "Comrade", Waller reveals that he is an ardent socialist, and Psmith agrees to come and hear him speak, dragging Mike along. When a spectator goes to throw a stone at Waller, Mike intervenes, and a fight starts, which soon involves Psmith and a mob; the friends flee. Returning that evening for tea, Mike has an awful time, but Psmith acquires Waller's book of the proceedings of the "Tulse Hill Parliament", including some particularly fiery words from Mr Bickersdyke.

One day, worried by his son being ill, Waller fails to spot a forged cheque. To save the man's job, Mike takes the blame, and is fired and roasted by Bickersdyke. After work, Psmith trails Bickersdyke to a Victorian Turkish bath and threatens to leak Bickersdyke's anti-royalty speeches from the Tulse Hill book. Bickersdyke, furious, agrees to keep Mike on at the bank. Soon after, he is narrowly elected to Parliament, rendering the threat of the book useless, and Mike is moved to a new department, Fixed Deposits, a much less pleasant spot, with Psmith replacing him under Mr Waller.

As spring and sunshine arrive, Mike begins to long for the outdoors and his beloved cricket. One day, he is called by his brother Joe, who is playing for their county at Lord's. They are a man short, and need Mike to play; he agrees, asking Psmith to tell his new boss he has to "pop off"; the boss tells Mr Bickersdyke, who, as usual, is furious. Mike, convinced his job is over, resolves to play his heart out.

Psmith leaves work early, to take his father to the match. Mr Smith is shocked that the bank does not approve of people leaving to play cricket; Psmith persuades him that rather than working at the bank, he should study for the Bar. They arrive at the game just as Mike, playing well, reaches his century. After the match, Psmith tells Mike of his plans to study law at Cambridge, and also that his father, needing an agent for his estate, is willing to take Mike on, having first paid for him to go to the 'varsity too, to study the business.

Mr Bickersdyke, relaxing in his club, overjoyed at the thought of finally being able to sack Psmith and Mike, is further enraged when Psmith sympathetically announces their retirement from business.

== Characters ==
- Michael "Mike" Jackson, cricket-lover, had hoped to attend Cambridge, but sent to work at New Asiatic Bank because of family financial reverses
- Rupert Psmith, Mike's friend, at the mercy of his eccentric father, also sent to work at New Asiatic Bank; joins Mike in Postage
  - Mr Smith, Psmith's father, a wealthy taker-up of hobbies
- John Bickersdyke, a school-friend of Mr Smith, now head of the New Asiatic Bank
- Mr Rossiter, Head of Postage at the Bank, a football fan
- Mr Waller, Head of the Cash Department, an amiable sort
- Bannister, Mike's forerunner in Postage, an Old Boy of Geddington school
- Bristow, Mike replacement there, wearer of clothing that causes Psmith acute suffering

== Publication history ==
Under the title The New Fold, the story was published in six parts from October 1908 to March 1909 in The Captain and illustrated by T. M. R. Whitwell.

The book is dedicated: "To Leslie Havergal Bradshaw". The first edition of the book included twelve full page illustrations by T. M. R. Whitwell. The American edition was issued in November 1910 by Macmillan, New York, from imported sheets.

The story was included in the 1974 collection The World of Psmith, published by Barrie & Jenkins, London. An excerpt from the novel was included in the anthology Benny Green's The Cricket Addict's Archive, published in London by Elm Tree Books in 1977 and by Pavilion Books in 1985.

The book contains an early use in print of a variation of the phrase "Elementary, my dear Watson". In the book, Psmith says after making a deduction, "My dear Holmes, how—! Elementary, my dear fellow, quite elementary." This appeared in the second part of the serial in The Captain magazine, published in November 1908. The phrase "Elementary, my dear Watson, elementary" is used by Psmith in the following novel, Psmith, Journalist.

== Reception ==
The British writer Jeremy Lewis called Psmith in the City "the supreme achievement of P. G. Wodehouse," describing it as "a masterly exposé of office life."

== Adaptations ==
The story was adapted as a radio drama, which first aired in four parts between 19 September and 10 October 2008 on BBC Radio 4, dramatised by Marcy Kahan and produced by Abigail le Fleming. The cast included Simon Williams as P. G. Wodehouse (the narrator), Nick Caldecott as Psmith, Inam Mirza as Mike Jackson, Stephen Critchlow as John Bickersdyke, Jonathan Tafler as Mr Waller, Robert Lonsdale as Bannister, Dan Starkey as Jo Jackson and Bill, Ryan Watson as Edward Waller, Jill Cardo as Ada, and Chris Pavlo as Mr Rossiter, Mr Jackson, Mr Gregory, and Comrade Prebble.

== See also ==
Mike and Psmith returned in two more books:

- Psmith, Journalist (1915)
- Leave it to Psmith (1923)
