= The Prince and Betty (film) =

1919 film

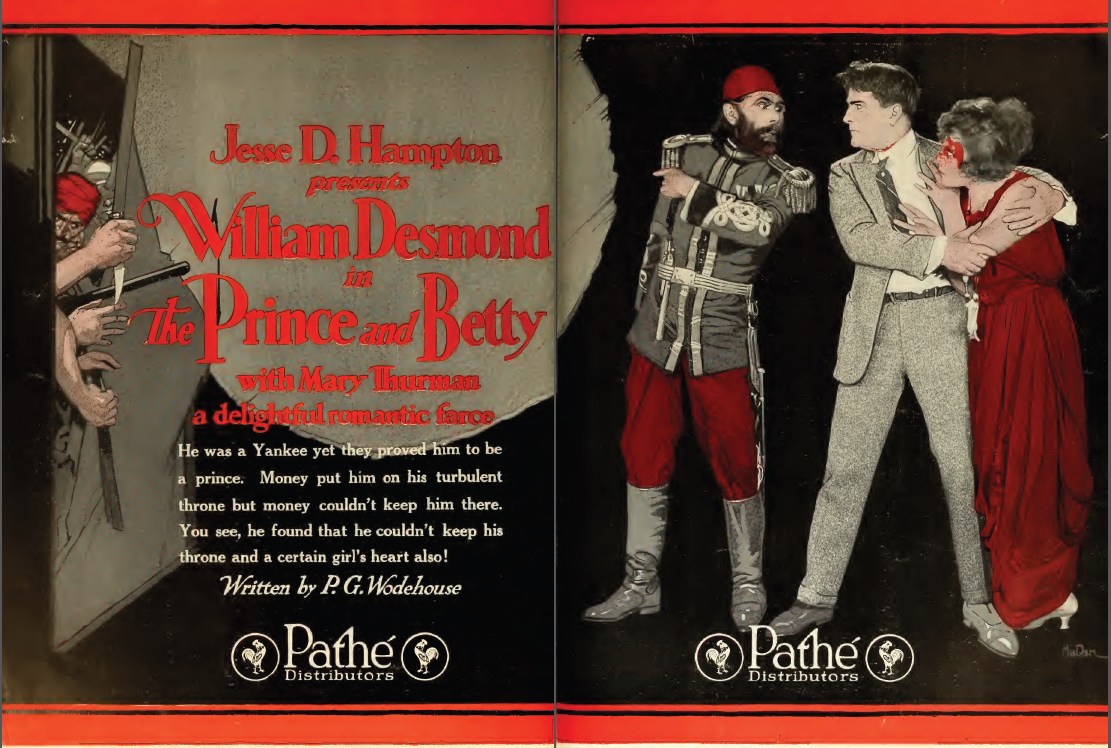
- Advert for the film
- Directed by: Robert Thornby
- Written by: Fred Myton
- Based on: The Prince and Betty by P. G. Wodehouse
- Produced by: Jesse D. Hampton
- Starring: William Desmond; Mary Thurman
- Cinematography: Harry W. Gerstad
- Production company: Jesse D. Hampton Productions
- Distributed by: Pathé Exchange
- Release date: December 21, 1919
- Running time: 5 reels
- Country: United States
- Language: Silent (English intertitles)

The Prince and Betty is a lost 1919 American silent comedy film directed by Robert Thornby. It features Boris Karloff in an uncredited role. It is based on the 1912 novel The Prince and Betty written by P. G. Wodehouse.

== Plot ==
As described in a film magazine, Benjamin Scobell, possessed of the idea that he can make the Principality of Merve more famous than Monte Carlo, if properly advertised, employs the American John Maude to impersonate a prince and start a revolution. John, anxious to marry the wealthy Betty Keith but temporarily out of funds, accepts the assignment. Later he learns that Betty is the stepdaughter of Scobell and that she disapproves of his method of obtaining a livelihood, which upsets his plan completely. After the plot thickens, John and Betty make their escape from Merve to the United States and Scobell, finding John a resourceful fellow, employs him to look after his vast estate.

== Cast ==
- William Desmond as John Maude
- Mary Thurman as Betty Keith
- Anita Kay as Mrs. Jack Wheldon
- George Swann as Lord Hayling
- Walter Perry as President of Mervo
- Wilton Taylor as Benjamin Scobell
- William De Vaull as Crump
- Frank Lanning as The Shepherd
- Boris Karloff as Undetermined Role
