= Nick Caldecott =

British stage actor

Nick Caldecott (born 5 June 1968) is a British stage actor.

Caldecott was born in Northern Ireland. His early career began at the Royal Exchange Theatre, Manchester where he appeared in productions of Lady Windermere's Fan, the 1997 premiere of The Candidate and Ben Keaton's production of Bats, amongst other roles.

Following appearances at the Watermill Theatre and as Phileas Fogg in the 2006 Bristol Old Vic production of Around the World in Eighty Days, Caldecott starred as Algenon in The Importance of Being Earnest at the Derby Playhouse.

In 2008 he starred in She Stoops To Conquer at the Nuffield Theatre, Southampton and as John Middleton Murry alongside Ed Stoppard in the DH Lawrence biopic On the Rocks at the Hampstead Theatre. He also appeared as P. G. Wodehouse's Psmith in the BBC Radio 4 production of Psmith in the City before returning to the Royal Exchange in 2009 in the role of Reverend Lionel Toop in See How They Run.

In 2015, Caldecott appeared as Monsieur Fernel in BBC's TV series The Musketeers episode 2.6 "Through a Glass Darkly".
