= Leave It to Psmith =

1923 novel by P. G. Wodehouse

- First edition
- Author: P. G. Wodehouse
- Language: English
- Genre: Comic novel
- Publisher: Herbert Jenkins (UK); George H. Doran (US)
- Publication date: 30 November 1923 (UK); 14 March 1924 (US)
- Publication place: United Kingdom
- Media type: Print
- Pages: 327
- Preceded by: Psmith, Journalist (Psmith), Something Fresh (Blandings)
- Followed by: Blandings Castle and Elsewhere (short stories), Summer Lightning (novel)

Leave It to Psmith is a comic novel by English author P. G. Wodehouse, first published in the United Kingdom on 30 November 1923 by Herbert Jenkins, London, England, and in the United States on 14 March 1924 by George H. Doran, New York. It had previously been serialised in the Saturday Evening Post in the US between 3 February and 24 March 1923, and in the Grand Magazine in the UK between April and December that year; the ending of this magazine version was rewritten for the book form.

It was the fourth and final novel featuring Psmith, the others being Mike (1909) (later republished in two parts, with Psmith appearing in the second, Mike and Psmith (1953)), Psmith in the City (1910), and Psmith, Journalist (1915). In his introduction to the omnibus The World of Psmith, Wodehouse said that he had stopped writing about the character because he couldn't think of any more stories. It was also the second novel set at Blandings Castle, the first being Something Fresh (1915). The Blandings saga would be continued in many more novels and short stories.

The book is dedicated to the author's step-daughter Leonora Wodehouse, referred to as "Queen of her species".

== Plot ==
Lord Emsworth is distressed to learn from his secretary, Rupert Baxter, that his sister Lady Constance (Connie) Keeble has invited the Canadian poet Ralston McTodd to stay at Blandings Castle, where another poet, Aileen Peavey, is already in residence. Emsworth is further annoyed to be told that he must leave his beloved gardens to travel to London to collect McTodd and to interview a Miss Halliday for the post of library cataloguer.

Connie’s husband, Joe Keeble, wants to lend money to his stepdaughter Phyllis Jackson and her husband Mike, but Connie, who controls their joint bank account, refuses. Emsworth’s feckless son, Freddie Threepwood, also needs funds and approaches his uncle Joe with a plan to circumvent Connie’s control. He suggests stealing Connie’s valuable necklace, a gift from Joe, so that Joe can sell it on and distribute the proceeds between Phyllis, Freddie, and himself. Joe agrees.

Freddie, not keen on doing the job himself, responds to a newspaper advertisement placed by Ronald Psmith, an elegant young man who is about to resign from his wealthy uncle’s fish business and who is offering to take on any job (except fish). Psmith is a friend of Mike Jackson and his wife Phyllis. Phyllis is an old schoolfriend of Eve Halliday, and Eve is loved by Freddie. Another friend of Eve’s, Cynthia, has been abandoned by her husband, Ralston McTodd.

Psmith is smitten when he sees Eve sheltering from the rain opposite The Drones Club, and he chivalrously dashes out to give her the best umbrella from the club's umbrella rack. Later, he encounters Emsworth at the Senior Conservative Club in London, where the Earl is dining with McTodd. Irritated at being left alone when the Earl absent-mindedly potters across the street to inspect a flower shop, McTodd departs in a rage. When Emsworth returns, he short-sightedly mistakes Psmith for his guest. Learning that Eve will soon be working at Blandings, Psmith decides to continue the deception and travels with Emsworth to the castle, posing as McTodd. During the journey, Freddie quietly explains his plan, and Psmith agrees to take charge of the theft.

At Blandings, the false McTodd is warmly welcomed by Aileen Peavey, though Baxter is suspicious. Psmith begins courting Eve, with some success despite her belief that he is the man who has wronged her friend Cynthia. Peavey, who is in fact a criminal known as “Smooth Lizzie”, enlists her former partner, the card sharp Eddie Cootes, into her own plan to acquire the necklace. Psmith is forced to agree to Cootes posing as his valet, but for safety's sake arranges the use of a quiet cottage nearby for his own personal use. Joe blurts out details of his and Freddie's plan to Eve.

During a poetry-reading in the drawing room, Cootes suddenly turns off the house lights, and Peavey snatches Connie's necklace and flings it out the window, expecting Cootes to run quickly round to scoop it up. However, the necklace lands near Eve, who happens to be taking the evening air. Quickly seizing her chance, she hides it in a flowerpot. Returning at night to recover it, she wakes Baxter, but evades him, leaving him embarrassingly locked out of the house in his lemon-coloured pyjamas. Attempting to raise the alarm, Baxter throws flowerpots through a window, leading Emsworth to believe he has gone mad. Next morning, Baxter is dismissed.

Eve discovers the necklace is missing from its hiding place and suspects Psmith. Accompanied by Freddie, she searches his cottage. Psmith arrives and explains his motives, and his friendship with Mike and Phyllis. Cootes and Peavey appear, armed, and threaten to escape with the necklace, but Psmith takes advantage of Freddie's leg crashing through the rotten ceiling to distract Cootes and retrieve the jewels.

Joe Keeble provides Phyllis and Freddie with their promised money, Psmith and Eve become engaged, and Psmith is appointed as Lord Emsworth’s new secretary.

Psmith (left) and Freddie, 1923 illustration by May Wilson Preston in The Saturday Evening Post

== Principal characters ==
- Lord Emsworth, owner of Blandings Castle, widower
- The Hon. Freddie Threepwood, his feckless younger son
- Lady Constance (Connie) Keeble, Emsworth's imperious sister
- Joe Keeble, Connie's husband
- Phyllis Jackson, Joe Keeble's stepdaughter
- Mike Jackson, her husband
- Rupert Baxter, Lord Emsworth's efficient secretary
- Eve Halliday, an old friend of Phyllis, hired to catalogue the library
- Ronald Psmith, an old friend of Mike, an elegant young man
- Ralston McTodd, a Canadian poet
- Cynthia, his estranged wife, an old friend of Eve and Phyllis
- Aileen Peavey ("Smooth Lizzie"), a poet and undercover criminal
- Edward Cootes, a card-sharp, in love with Peavey

== Style ==
Wodehouse uses vivid, exaggerated imagery in similes and metaphors for comic effect. For example, in chapter 7: "A sound like two or three pigs feeding rather noisily in the middle of a thunderstorm interrupted his meditation". He also uses literary references, sometimes adding to the quote to make it absurdly apposite to the situation. In chapter 11, the author writes:

"Oh, it's you?" he said morosely.
"I in person," said Psmith genially. "Awake, beloved! Awake, for morning in the bowl of night has flung the stone that puts the stars to flight; and lo! the hunter of the East has caught the Sultan's turret in the noose of light. The Sultan himself," he added, "you will find behind yonder window, speculating idly on your motives for bunging flower-pots at him."

Descriptions generally contain humorous elements, inserted into what would otherwise be pure exposition, for example in the description of Aileen Peavy in chapter 10: "She was alone. It is a sad but indisputable fact that in this imperfect world Genius is too often condemned to walk alone—if the earthier members of the community see it coming and have time to duck".

Injuries generally do much less harm than would normally be expected in real life, being similar to the inconsequential injuries depicted in stage comedies. After Psmith wakes up Freddie Threepwood by arranging for Freddie's suitcase to fall on him, Freddie merely massages the stricken spot, gurgles wordlessly, and is soon ready to resume normal conversation.

One of the prime sources of humour is the distinctive or absurd names given to characters, places, and brands of goods. In chapter 5, Psmith explains that the initial P in this name is silent, "as in pshrimp".

== Background ==
Eve and Psmith, 1923 Grand Magazine illustration

Wodehouse's adopted daughter Leonora had asked him to write another Psmith story. The finished book bears the dedication: "To my daughter Leonora, queen of her species."

== Publication history ==
The story was illustrated by May Wilson Preston in The Saturday Evening Post. The illustrator for the Grand serial is not stated, but the artist's signature, visible on some of the illustrations such as the first two in the first part and one in the fifth part, is the same as one used by A. Wallis Mills. Mills's signature can also be seen on the illustrations for one of the other Wodehouse books serialised in The Grand Magazine, The Adventures of Sally.

The complete novel was included in the 1932 collection Nothing But Wodehouse. It was also featured in the 1974 collection The World of Psmith.

== Adaptations ==
The story was adapted into a play, also titled Leave It to Psmith, by Wodehouse and Ian Hay. It opened at the Shaftesbury Theatre in London on 29 September 1930 and ran for 156 performances.

The film Leave It to Me (1933) was adapted from the 1930 play based on the novel.

A radio drama based on the novel was broadcast on BBC Radio 4 in October 1981. Dramatised by Michael Bakewell, it featured John Gielgud narrating as P. G. Wodehouse, Michael Hordern as Lord Emsworth, Joan Greenwood as Lady Constance, Simon Ward as Psmith, and Caroline Langrishe as Eve.

A 1988 Indian television ten-episode serial titled Isi Bahane (On This Excuse) was based on the novel and aired on DD National. The serial was produced by Doordarshan.

The novel was dramatised for radio by Archie Scottney, with Martin Jarvis as Lord Emsworth, Patricia Hodge as Constance, Edward Bennett as Psmith, and Susannah Fielding as Eve. The adaptation aired on BBC Radio 4 in May 2020.

== See also ==
- A full list of the Blandings stories.
