= The Gold Bat =

1904 novel by P. G. Wodehouse

- First edition
- Author: P. G. Wodehouse
- Language: English
- Publisher: A & C Black
- Publication date: 13 September 1904
- Publication place: United Kingdom
- Media type: Print (hardback & paperback)

The Gold Bat is a novel by P. G. Wodehouse, first published on 13 September 1904 by A & C Black, London. It was originally serialised in The Captain.

Set at the fictional public school of Wrykyn, the novel tells of how two boys, O'Hara and Moriarty, tar and feather a statue of a local politician as a prank. They get away with it, but O'Hara had borrowed a tiny gold cricket bat belonging to Trevor, the captain of the cricket team. After the prank, the boys discover that the trinket is missing. Schoolboy honour is at stake as Trevor and his friends conceal the loss of the gold bat until, through a stroke of luck, they find it. The novel deals with events during that term, including inter-house rugby matches and the dastardly actions of a mysterious society called "the League".

Wrykyn School appears again in The White Feather (1907) and as the setting of the first half of Mike (1909). It is also mentioned occasionally in later Wodehouse works.

== Plot ==
After the local mayor Sir Eustace Briggs makes negative remarks about Ireland, two Irish students at Wrykyn, O'Hara and Moriarty, sneak out at night to tar and feather a statue of Briggs, though they use leaves instead of feathers. They are not caught, but O'Hara realizes that during the escapade, he lost a tiny gold cricket bat he borrowed from his friend Trevor. Trevor won the bat, which is about an inch long, as a trophy since he was the captain of the winning cricket team in the latest house cricket cup. He is supposed to return it to the school by the next house cricket cup. Trevor is concerned about being blamed for the statue incident if the gold bat is found near the statue. Meanwhile, there is a vacant spot in the school rugby football team, and Trevor, as captain, considers Rand-Brown for the position, but favours Barry, who is smaller than Rand-Brown but more skilled.

A study belonging to a prefect named Mill is found wrecked, and a calling card left behind indicates that it was done by a group called the League, which was the name used by a society of students several years prior who bullied others to get what they wanted until they were expelled. The society has apparently been revived. Trevor receives a letter warning him that the League does not wish Barry to play for the school rugby team. Trevor knows the team will do better with Barry than Rand-Brown and ignores the letter. As a result, Trevor's study is also wrecked by the League. Rand-Brown has the clearest motive for trying to get Barry out of the team, and dislikes Mill, but he could not have damaged Trevor's study since he was playing rugby at the time the incident occurred. O'Hara tries to find where the League meets and believes he has succeeded when he sees two figures in a basement used to store extra chairs, but it turns out that they are only the two younger students Renford and Harvey, who are secretly keeping two ferrets in the basement.

The study of another prefect, Milton, is also wrecked by the League. Leather-Twigg, known as "Shoeblossom", saw a white figure coming out of Milton's study who was probably responsible, and Milton thinks the figure's description fits Rand-Brown, whom he insulted on the rugby field. Trevor receives a letter from the League warning him that they have the gold bat. Barry sprains his ankle and is unable to play in an important match against another school, Ripton, so Trevor chooses Rand-Brown to play instead. However, Trevor suspects Rand-Brown of being part of the League and searches his study for the gold bat, but Rand-Brown denies being involved with the League and Trevor does not find the bat. Rand-Brown plays badly in the important match and Barry is permanently awarded the place in the team. O'Hara and Moriarty again investigate the basement, but only find several students secretly smoking. The students smoking are caught, and O'Hara and Moriarty barely escape through a trap-door. Thereafter, the basement is kept locked, so O'Hara helps Renford and Harvey by moving the ferrets to another location behind the fives-courts.

The headmaster tells Trevor to search the studies in Dexter's House for hidden tobacco. While searching with his friend Clowes, they find the missing gold bat in a drawer in the study of Ruthven, who admits that he was blackmailed by Rand-Brown to form the League with him. Trevor intends to settle his feud with Rand-Brown with a fight, but O'Hara, who is a boxer, knows Trevor does not know how to fight and arranges a boxing match between himself and Rand-Brown before Trevor gets a chance. Moriarty goes as O'Hara's second. The fight takes place by one of the fives-courts, and Renford, coming upon the fight while on his way to feed the ferrets, agrees to keep time. O'Hara wins the fight, and it is also revealed that Rand-Brown is leaving the school since he was one of the students caught smoking. Political protesters repeat the tarring and feathering of Briggs's statue, apparently inspired by O'Hara and Moriarty's initiative. Sir Eustace Briggs was suspicious of the school's students after hearing that a tiny gold bat was found near the statue, and given to a student who claimed it was his property, but now thinks the protesters tarred and feathered the statue the first time too. Trevor also denies to Sir Eustace Briggs that it was his bat. Choosing his words carefully, he claims that his bat had been in a drawer nearly all the term.

== Characters ==
- Trevor, a school prefect and head of Donaldson's House, member of the First Eleven and captain of the First Fifteen, also appears in The White Feather, Mike, "The Reformation of Study Sixteen", and "The Last Place"
- Clowes, a close friend of Trevor in Donaldson's, also appears The White Feather, Mike, "The Reformation of Study Sixteen", and "The Last Place"
- O'Hara, an Irish student and light-weight boxer in Dexter's House, also appears in The White Feather, "Jackson's Extra", and "The Deserter"
- Moriarty, another Irish student in Dexter's who is also a boxer
- Rand-Brown, a member of Seymour's House and the school's Second Fifteen rugby football team who wants to be in the First Fifteen
- Barry, an enthusiastic rugby player initially in the Third Fifteen, shares a study with his friend M'Todd in Seymour's, also appears in The White Feather and "An Affair of Boats"
- Renford, a fourteen-year-old member of Seymour's House who is Milton's fag and looks after two ferrets with Harvey, also appears in The White Feather and "An Affair of Boats"
- Harvey, a member of Seymour's who keeps a pair of ferrets named Sir Nigel and Sherlock Holmes with help from his friend Renford
- Leather-Twigg, known as "Shoeblossom", an unpredictable troublemaker in Seymour's, also appears in Mike and "An Affair of Boats"
- Ruthven, a member of Dexter's who is an acquaintance of Trevor but disliked by Clowes, also appears in "An International Affair"
- Mill, an unpopular prefect in Seymour's, also appears in "An Affair of Boats"
- Milton, the head of Seymour's, also appears in "The Last Place" and "The Politeness of Princes"
- Sir Eustace Briggs, the pompous mayor of the nearby town of Wrykyn

== Publication history ==
The story was serialised in The Captain in six parts from October 1903 to March 1904, with illustrations by T. M. R. Whitwell.

The novel is dedicated "To That Prince of Slackers, Herbert Westbrook". The first edition of the book included eight of the illustrations by T. M. R. Whitwell from the serial. The American edition was issued by Macmillan, New York, from imported sheets in 1923.

Under the title By Order of the League!, the story was serialised in the magazine The Boys' Friend (UK) from January to February in 1923.

It was included in The Gold Bat and Other Stories, a collection of three school novels by Wodehouse published by Penguin Books in March 1986. The book also includes The Head of Kay's and The White Feather.
