= Joy in the Morning (Wodehouse novel) =

1946 novel by P. G. Wodehouse

- First edition (US)
- Author: P. G. Wodehouse
- Language: English
- Series: Jeeves
- Genre: Comic novel
- Publisher: Doubleday, Doran (US); Herbert Jenkins (UK)
- Publication date: 22 August 1946 (US); 2 June 1947 (UK)
- Publication place: United Kingdom
- Media type: Print
- Preceded by: The Code of the Woosters
- Followed by: The Mating Season

Joy in the Morning is a novel by English humorist P. G. Wodehouse, first published in the United States on 22 August 1946 by Doubleday & Co., New York and in the United Kingdom on 2 June 1947 by Herbert Jenkins, London. Some later American paperback editions bore the title Jeeves in the Morning.

The story is another adventure of Bertie Wooster and his resourceful valet Jeeves. Bertie is persuaded to brave the home of his fearsome Aunt Agatha and her husband Lord Worplesdon, knowing that his former fiancée, the beautiful and formidably intellectual Lady Florence Craye will also be in attendance.

The title derives from an English translation of Psalms 30:5:

"Weeping may endure for a night, but joy cometh in the morning."

Wodehouse was working on the novel in Le Touquet, France before he was interned by the occupying German authorities. He completed the book in Germany after his wife, Ethel, brought the unfinished manuscript with her when she joined her husband in Berlin. The manuscript was completed in Degenershausen, a small village in the Harz mountains.

== Plot ==
The novel opens with a brief flashforward of Bertie and Jeeves driving home, with Bertie remarking that there is an expression, something about Joy, that describes what he has just been through. Jeeves helpfully supplies the phrase, "Joy cometh in the morning". Bertie proceeds to narrate the events that occurred.

Jeeves wants to go fishing at the village of Steeple Bumpleigh, but Bertie refuses because his fearsome Aunt Agatha and her second husband, the irascible Lord Worplesdon, live there at Bumpleigh Hall. Bertie tries to make it up to Jeeves by buying him a gift, a new edition of the works of Spinoza. In the bookshop, Bertie runs into Florence Craye, Worplesdon's daughter and a serious, intellectual woman to whom Bertie was once engaged. Through a misunderstanding, she happily believes that Bertie is trying to improve his mind by reading Spinoza and her own book Spindrift, causing him to fear that she will renew their engagement. Afterwards, Bertie sees his college friend D'Arcy "Stilton" Cheesewright, who reveals he is engaged to Florence, much to Bertie's relief. Meanwhile, Jeeves has been consulted by Worplesdon on how to arrange a clandestine meeting with an American businessman, Chichester Clam, without alerting the press. Jeeves suggested that Bertie rent a cottage (called Wee Nooke) in Steeple Bumpleigh where the two businessmen can meet in secret. Bertie is incensed but calms when he learns there is a fancy-dress ball and that his Aunt Agatha is away from Bumpleigh Hall. She does, however, instruct Bertie to pick up and deliver a brooch as a birthday present for Florence.

Bertie drives to Steeple Bumpleigh with his friend, Zenobia "Nobby" Hopwood. She is engaged to Bertie's friend George "Boko" Fittleworth, who lives in the village. Worplesdon, Nobby's guardian, does not approve of Boko and therefore has not consented to the marriage. On arrival, Bertie runs into Stilton who is revealed to be a village policeman. Under the impression that Bertie is attempting to woo Florence, Stilton threateningly tells him to leave. Florence tells Bertie that she wishes that Stilton be an MP but he has refused causing tension in their engagement. At Wee Nooke, Bertie encounters Florence's troublesome younger brother Edwin, a boy scout. As one of his daily acts of kindness, Edwin attempts to clean the chimney only to burn down the cottage after using gunpowder and then paraffin. Worplesdon blames Bertie for the fire and ruining his meeting place for Clam. He invites Jeeves to stay at the Hall, leaving Bertie to lodge with Boko. Bertie discovers that he has lost Florence's birthday brooch, so he sends Jeeves to London to obtain a replacement.

"Jeeves tells me that Edwin has succeeded in burning Wee Nooke to the ground. Correct, Bertie?"
"Quite correct. It was his last Friday's act of kindness."

— Boko asks Bertie about the fire

After welcoming Bertie to his cottage, Boko tells him his plan to win Worplesdon's approval: he will pretend to stop a burglar at the Hall with Bertie playing the role of burglar. Despite his misgivings, Bertie agrees. Before he can break in, Bertie is put off by the presence of Edwin. He then runs into Jeeves who says that since Wee Nooke has been burned down, Worplesdon and Clam plan to meet in the potting shed that night. Boko mistakes Clam for an intruder and locks him in the shed, enraging Worplesdon. When Worplesdon insists that the imprisoned Clam is not a burglar, Boko (unaware of the situation) heavily berates him, straining their relationship even more. Jeeves devises a new plan where Boko come to Worpleson's defense while Bertie insults him, but Bertie refuses. Edwin tells Bertie that Florence and Stilton have fallen out and that he found the original brooch and gave it to Florence. Florence confirms the engagement is over after Stilton criticised Modern Enlightened Thought. Bertie tries to reason with her but instead she kisses him believing that he is being selfless and that the brooch was a present from him and renews their engagement, much to his horror.

Boko, once engaged to Florence himself, agrees to disclose how he got out of it if Bertie insults Worplesdon. Jeeves, however, discovers that Boko alienated her by kicking Edwin. Bertie does the same, but Florence ends up approving as Edwin had messed up her scrap album. Nobby promises Bertie to show Florence a letter in which he criticised her if Bertie insults Worplesdon. Bertie visits his uncle's study, but before the plan can proceed, Boko is escorted from the grounds by a gardener after Worplesdon discovers him hiding in the garden. Worplesdon receives Bertie warmly after hearing he kicked Edwin, something he'd wanted to do for years, and takes Bertie into his confidence. Jeeves advises that Bertie suggest to Worplesdon that he and Clam meet in disguise at the fancy-dress ball to take place that night; Worplesdon to wear the Sindbad the Sailor costume that Bertie had brought for himself. Boko drives to London to buy himself and Bertie new costumes but brings back the wrong bag. Jeeves steals Stilton's police uniform for Bertie so he can attend the ball and persuade Worplesdon to approve Nobby marrying Boko. Worplesdon's negotiations with Clam are successfully concluded by the time Bertie arrives. Worplesdon warms to Boko when he hears that he has also kicked Edwin and will shortly be starting a job in Hollywood, six thousand miles away. He approves the marriage.

The next morning, Stilton arrives to arrest Bertie for stealing his uniform but Boko reminds him that he needs a warrant. When Bertie tries to flee, he discovers that Worplesdon has been accidentally locked in Boko's garage overnight. Worplesdon emerges furious with Boko and withdraws his approval of the marriage. Worplesdon is horrified, however, when Jeeves informs him that Aunt Agatha, who disapproves of all fancy-dress balls, has returned unexpectedly and wants to know where Worplesdon has been. Jeeves suggests that Worplesdon say he spent the evening discussing the wedding plans with Nobby and Boko, then slept at Boko's cottage overnight. Worplesdon agrees, consenting to the marriage again. Stilton returns with a warrant but Worplesdon gives Bertie a false alibi. Nobby informs Bertie that Edwin has destroyed the insulting letter that Bertie wanted her to show to Florence. Stilton resigns from the police force in disgust at Worplesdon's underhanded behaviour which causes Florence to reconcile with him to Bertie's delight. Bertie prepares to face his Aunt Agatha with Worplesdon but Jeeves confesses that he lied about her returning.

With no reason to stay, the pair escape from Steeple Bumpleigh by car. Bertie tries to remember an expression which he feels sums up recent events, something about Joy, but notes that he already narrated all this before.

== Style ==
One of the stylistic devices used by Wodehouse for comic effect is the transferred epithet, using an adjective to modify a noun rather than the verb of the sentence, as in chapter 5: "I balanced a thoughtful lump of sugar on the teaspoon". Wodehouse employs exaggerated imagery in similes and metaphors, sometimes involving violent imagery that is mitigated either because any injuries that occur are much less serious than they would be in real life, or because actual violence is not taking place. An example of the latter case occurs in chapter 15, when Bertie Wooster compares someone who is suddenly surprised to someone who has been "struck in the small of the back by the Cornish Express". Though Bertie does not often use malapropisms, one is used in chapter 18, after Florence criticizes Stilton by calling him an uncouth Cossack. Bertie misunderstands: "A cossack, I knew, was one of those things clergymen wear, and I wondered why she thought Stilton was like one. An inquiry into this would have been fraught with interest, but before I could institute it she had continued". (Bertie is confusing a Cossack with a cassock.)

Throughout the stories, Jeeves teaches Bertie words and phrases, such as the Latin phrases nolle prosequi and rem acu tetigisti, that become recurring expressions in Bertie's language. This shows the influence that Jeeves has over Bertie. Bertie picks up nolle prosequi from Jeeves in Right Ho, Jeeves, and though Bertie initially uses it simply to signify a refusal, he later varies it in comic ways. For example, he renders the phrase in colloquial terms in chapter 12 of Joy in the Morning, when explaining to Nobby that he could not stand up to Florence:

"And if you think I've got the force of character to come back with a nolle prosequi—"
"A what?"
"One of Jeeves's gags. It means roughly 'Nuts to you!' If, I say, you think I'm capable of asserting myself and giving her the bird, you greatly overestimate the Wooster fortitude."

Jeeves introduces rem acu tetigisti in chapter 4 of Joy in the Morning, translating it as "You have touched the matter with a needle", which Bertie rephrases as "Put my finger on the nub". In addition to using this phrase in later novels, Bertie makes an attempt to repeat it when talking to Nobby Hopwood in chapter 27:

"Exactly," I said. "You have touched the matter with a needle."
"Done what?"
"One of Jeeves's gags," I explained. "Rem something. Latin stuff."

Literary references are common in Wodehouse's stories, with comic changes often being made to the quotations. This is accomplished in a number of ways, such as when Bertie uses quotations in unusual contexts, or paraphrases them using colloquial language. Jeeves also provides ways of altering standard quotations. For example, he occasionally breaks up the familiar rhythm of poetry by inserting an unnecessary "sir" or "madam" into the quotation, as when he quotes from Shakespeare's The Merchant of Venice in chapter 14: "There's not the smallest orb which thou beholdest, sir, but in his motion like an angel sings, still quiring to the young-eyed cherubims".

After Right Ho, Jeeves, Bertie becomes more intelligent and more a partner to Jeeves, working more closely with him to solve problems. For example, in Joy in the Morning, Bertie objects to part of Jeeves's plan about the fancy dress ball, suggesting he and Boko should attend it; Jeeves expresses "cordial agreement" and changes his plan accordingly. Bertie also makes a shrewd move at the ball when he influences Worplesdon on Boko's behalf by reminding Worplesdon that Boko had once kicked the bothersome Edwin.

Wodehouse scholar Richard Usborne used Joy in the Morning to highlight the difficulty of translating Wodehouse's English into another language, due to the combination of slang terms and allusions that Wodehouse employs. He compares Wodehouse's original text with a translation of Joy in the Morning into French by Denyse and Benoît de Fanscolombe, published by Amiot-Dumont under the title Jeeves, au secours!. Thus Wodehouse's phrase "to give the little snurge six of the best with a bludgeon" becomes, in French, "flanquer au maudit galopin une volée de martinet".

== Background ==
Wodehouse wrote much of the novel in France during the Phoney War and the German occupation of France before he was interned for being a British national. In view of the circumstances under which Joy in the Morning was written, Robert McCrum, in his biography of Wodehouse, states regarding the novel: "A more brilliant example of Wodehouse's literary escapism is hard to find". In the 2013 television film Wodehouse in Exile, which depicts this period of P. G. Wodehouse's life, Wodehouse is shown working on the novel in some scenes.

Wodehouse discussed ideas used for the character of Stilton Cheesewright in a letter he wrote to his friend William "Bill" Townend. In the letter, dated 6 April 1940, Wodehouse asked Townend if it were possible for a young peer to become a country policeman with the idea that he could later get into Scotland Yard. Wodehouse stated that the character "has got to be a policeman, because Bertie pinches his uniform in order to go to a fancy dress dance, at which it is vital for him to be present as he has no other costume".

Joy in the Morning was written with elements of England from the early twentieth century, as with the other Jeeves stories, despite being published in 1946. In a letter to Townend, dated 7 March 1946, Wodehouse wondered how this aspect of the novel would be received, but noted optimistically that "my stuff has been out of date since 1914, and nobody has seemed to mind". Wodehouse discussed the same subject in a letter written on 10 April 1946 to writer Compton Mackenzie. In that letter, Wodehouse wrote that his newest novels, including Joy in the Morning, were "definitely historical novels now, as they all deal with a life in which country houses flourish and butlers flit to and fro. I'm hoping that people, in America at any rate, will overlook the fact that they are completely out of date and accept them for their entertainment value. I think they're all pretty funny, but, my gosh, how obsolete!".

== Publication history ==
The first American edition of Joy in the Morning included illustrations by Paul Galdone, who also illustrated the dust wrapper.

== Reception ==
- The New York Times Book Review (25 August 1946): "Massively plotted, perfunctorily motivated, exquisitely characterized, written in a pleasingly mannered (if not downright euphuistic) prose—one can in the end say no more than that about it, and that much is true of any Wodehouse book. … Maybe Wodehouse uses the same plot over and over again. Whatever he does, it's moderately wonderful, a ray of pale English sunshine in a gray world". The review also comments on the controversy surrounding Wodehouse's wartime broadcasts: "There is, of course, the question of Mr. Wodehouse's 'war guilt.' Upon mature post-war reflection, it turned out to be about equal to the war guilt of the dachshunds which were stoned by super-heated patriots during World War I".
- In his book Wodehouse at Work (1961), Richard Usborne states that Joy in the Morning was perhaps the best of the author's books: "If I had to pick one as his happiest, best constructed and most jewel-encrusted, I'd say Joy in the Morning".
- Frances Donaldson, in her biography of Wodehouse, published in 1982, did not rate the book as highly as Usborne did, considering that some of Wodehouse's other novels, including the Jeeves-Wooster stories Right Ho, Jeeves and The Mating Season, were superior.
- In his 2004 biography of Wodehouse, Robert McCrum states that Joy in the Morning is "thought by a fervent minority to be his masterpiece".
- Raymond Sokolov, The Wall Street Journal (17 May 2013): "With his feckless Bertie Wooster and his omniscient man's man Jeeves at the center of the sublime foolery, Wodehouse, in novel after novel, just kept on letting us smile at a world of privilege and big houses, upstairs and downstairs going gently topsy-turvy. "Joy" is the story of a country weekend from hell at Steeple Bumpleigh. Engagements crumble, jewelry is mislaid, tempers are lost, drinks drunk. Jeeves saves the day, really he saves the world and now has time to read the latest scholarly edition of Spinoza".

== Adaptations ==
=== Television ===
The story was adapted into the Jeeves and Wooster episode "Lady Florence Craye Arrives in New York" which first aired on 23 May 1993.

=== Radio ===
Joy in the Morning was adapted for radio in 1978 as part of the BBC series What Ho! Jeeves starring Michael Hordern as Jeeves and Richard Briers as Bertie Wooster.
