= Big Money (novel) =

1931 novel by P. G. Wodehouse

- First US edition
- Author: P. G. Wodehouse
- Publisher: Doubleday, Doran
- Publication date: 30 January 1931

Big Money is a novel by P. G. Wodehouse, first published in the United States on 30 January 1931 by Doubleday, Doran, New York, and in the United Kingdom on 20 March 1931 by Herbert Jenkins, London. It was serialised in Collier's (US) from 20 September to 6 December 1930 and in the Strand Magazine (UK) between October 1930 and April 1931.

The story concerns two young men: Godfrey, Lord Biskerton ("Biscuit") and his one-time inseparable comrade John Beresford Conway ("Berry"), and their efforts to raise money and to woo their respective girls.

== Plot summary ==
Ann Margaret Moon is engaged to marry Godfrey, Lord Biskerton, reported in newspapers in New England and London. The daughter of a wealthy New England family in the US, she is in London for the summer, staying with the widowed acquaintance of her uncle Paterson Frisby. She seeks adventure. Godfrey is quite happy, but he is preoccupied with the low state of his finances and being pursued for his debts.

Berry Conway, longtime friend of Godfrey, is secretary to the very wealthy American businessman Paterson Frisby, now based in London. One lovely day, Frisby takes the day off and lets Berry off as well. Berry sees Ann as she lunches with Godfrey's father. He is immediately smitten. He leaves the restaurant and sees Ann in her two-seater car. He jumps into her car and asks her to “follow that car”, as he works for the Secret Service and is tailing a man who might be a drug-dealing criminal. She does. They tail Godfrey, which is revealed when Godfrey stops at a tavern, and Berry follows him in to it. Godfrey reveals his financial woes; Berry says to come stay in the place next door to his in the suburb of Valley Fields to escape his creditors. Meanwhile, Ann drives away, back to Lady Vera Mace’s flat, where she is staying. Lady Vera is aunt of Godfrey.

Ann met Kitchie (Katherine) Valentine on the ship from America. Kitchie stays with her uncle near Berry’s home. Godfrey meets her soon after settling in his new abode.

Berry asks his boss for advice on land with a dud copper mine in Arizona, called “The Dream Come True”, that he has inherited. Frisby owns the mine adjacent but does not reveal this to Berry. Frisby arranges for an intermediary to buy it from Berry for a price of 500 pounds, 2,500 dollars. The intermediary, Mr Hoke, buys it in his own name, knowing that a new vein of copper recently found and worth millions is primarily on that land. Hoke then proposes a merger with Frisby, as the route to carry out the ore is through his parcel. Frisby is very angry at Hoke, but agrees.

A few days after meeting Ann the first time, Berry follows her to a ball being held in a hotel in London. He sees her engagement ring. Before they can talk, the host challenges Berry for his invitation and ejects him from the ball. Ann and Berry have yet to learn each other’s name.

Berry and Godfrey (aka Biscuit) talk about recent events. They share no names of their new female love interests.

Ann drives out to see Kitchie, who is out at the films with Mr Smith (aka Godfrey). Instead she meets Berry, who lives next door. They learn each other’s name, and Ann drives them to dinner in town. Late that evening, Godfrey returns home, and Berry tells him he is engaged. Godfrey is engaged to two girls: Ann and Kitchie. He seeks advice from Berry. Berry reveals that he is engaged to Ann Moon. Godfrey realises this is all for the best. Both friends now need some big money to pursue their dreams.

Godfrey’s father, George Lord Hoddesdon, is pleased he let their country estate to Frisby for 600 pounds. Frisby may host a party in his niece Ann’s honour. George tells his sister Lady Vera, and Ann joins them. She tells them she will not marry Godfrey, as she is engaged to Berry. Lady Vera ate dinner at the same restaurant as Ann and Berry. Lady Vera says that man is a fortune hunter. The next day, Ann drives to Berry’s house and has a long talk with his Old Retainer Hannah, the woman who watched over him since childhood and is soon to leave. The Old Retainer thinks of Berry in terms of bed socks and flannel, calling him cautious. She tells Ann that Berry works for Frisby, not the secret service. When Berry meets her that evening at a tea room, she snubs him, feeling he lied, and she leaves without hearing him.

Mr Hoke is afraid of Godfrey, who tells him after lunch one day, I know your secret. Hoke is so nervous at this statement that he tells Godfrey all about the low price of the stock and the announcement soon to be made about the vein of copper found at the mine, which will raise the stock price.

Godfrey understands this is the moment to buy stock in Frisby and Hoke’s copper mine, but cannot find anyone to give him capital after a day of seeking some.

At Conway’a front steps that evening, Mr Frisby’s barrister mistakes Godfrey for Berry, and offers him money to stay away from Ann, 2,000 pounds. Godfrey accepts the cheque meant for Berry. The attorney was instructed by Frisby after he and Lady Vera agreed this was the way to push Berry away from Ann, and push Ann back to Godfrey.

Soon after, when darkness has fallen, Hoke and his associate Captain Kelly arrive in Valley Fields. Hoke is drunk and holding a gun in the back garden. He enters Berry’s place to eat the meal left on Berry’s table. Then he walks to the parlor where Berry sits with the Earl of Hoddesdon, Godfrey’s father. The Earl of Hoddesdon also wants to pay Berry off.

At the same time, Ann Moon comes to Godfrey’s place, a surprise. She is still angry with Berry for lying to her and thinks she will reconnect with Godfrey. Ann relates that Lady Vera will marry Frisby, another surprise. Ann is sorry she ended her engagement to Godfrey. He congratulates her on her engagement with Berry. She relates that she has ended that. Godfrey shows her the photo of his fiancée, Kitchie. Godfrey then defends Berry and makes clear that Lady Vera is all wrong about him. As Ann is about to leave, Captain Kelly arrives with his gun and tells both to stay put, as the Captain will stay put in the front yard. The Captain and Hoke intend that their presence will prevent both Berry and Godfrey from going out to buy mine stock.

At Berry’s place, Berry and the Earl cope with the drunken and armed Hoke. Abruptly, Godfrey uses an axe to break through the thin party wall between his and Berry’s front rooms. Berry gets the gun away from Hoke and knocks him down. The Earl grabs a chair for defense as Godfrey enlarges the hole in the wall, and hits at the intruder, unaware it is his son. Then Ann walks through. Ann’s love for Berry revives.

Hoke told Berry about the scheme to defraud him with the purchase of the mine. Godfrey tells him of the presently low priced stock in the copper mine, and hands Berry the cheque to buy the stock next morning before the price rises, so both can have income. Berry goes outside to overtake Captain Kelly. The two schemers, Kelly and Hoke, are tied up until the stock is purchased, so Berry and Godfrey can get that big money when the stock price rises: buy low and then sell high.

When alone, Berry tells Ann that the Old Retainer, returning from the pictures, hit Kelly over the head with her umbrella. Berry had only to carry him inside. Ann is pleased to hear the truth of this, having seen his bravery against Hoke.

== Characters ==
See full list at the Russian Wodehouse Society's page here.
