= Florence Craye =

Fictional character in P. G. Wodehouse stories

Lady Florence Craye
- Jeeves character
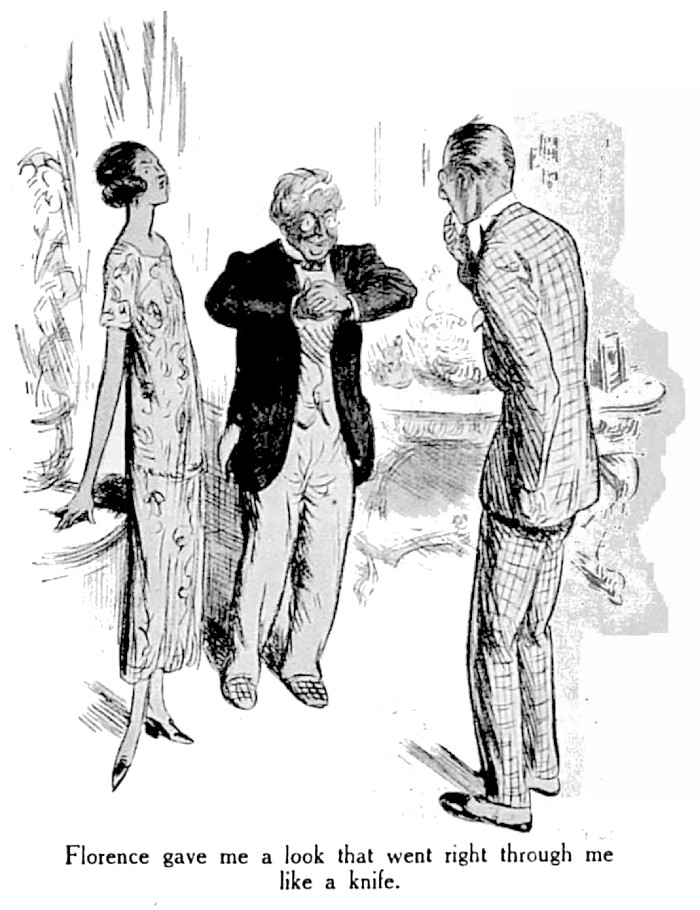
- Florence (left) glaring at Bertie (right) for failing to steal his uncle's memoirs, by A. Wallis Mills
- First appearance: "Jeeves Takes Charge" (1916)
- Last appearance: Much Obliged, Jeeves (1971)
- Created by: P. G. Wodehouse
- Portrayed by: Liza Goddard; Fiona Gillies and others

In-universe information
- Gender: Female
- Occupation: Author
- Family: Lord Worplesdon (father); Edwin Craye (brother)
- Nationality: British

Lady Florence Craye is a recurring fictional character who appears in P. G. Wodehouse's comedic Jeeves stories and novels. An intellectual and imperious young woman, she is an author who gets engaged at different times to various characters, each failing to perform a difficult task for her or to meet her high standards. She is one of the women to whom the hapless Bertie Wooster repeatedly finds himself reluctantly engaged, a situation from which he must be rescued by Jeeves.

== Prototype ==
An early version of Florence Craye appears in the Reggie Pepper story "Disentangling Old Percy" (1912), in which Florence has the same domineering personality. She has two younger brothers who are both old enough to be married, one ten years younger than she is, Edwin, and the other sixteen years younger than she, Percy (or Douglas). This early Florence appears to be a prototype for the later character, since in the Jeeves stories, Florence is a young woman, and Edwin, her only known sibling, is a young boy.

== Life and character ==
Being the daughter of Percy Craye, Earl of Worplesdon, Lady Florence Craye is the daughter of an Earl and is therefore entitled to the courtesy title of Lady. Jeeves formally addresses her as "m'lady" and refers to her as "her ladyship", while Bertie Wooster simply calls her "Florence". She is the elder sister to the troublesome young Edwin Craye and eventually becomes the step-daughter of Bertie's Aunt Agatha.

Florence is tall and willowy, with platinum blonde hair, an attractive profile, and bright hazel eyes, but also has an imperious personality. Bertie once suggests that marrying her would be difficult because the husband would have to look at her side-on all the time. Interested in intellectual matters, she is said by Bertie Wooster to be "steeped to the gills in serious purpose". She is an author and writes the novel Spindrift, which is widely read and apparently well received, going into five editions and popular with "the boys with the bulging foreheads out Bloomsbury way", though Jeeves considers it a "somewhat immature production lacking in significant form". The book is turned into a play by Percy Gorringe, though the play closes after only three nights.

Her first engagement mentioned in the stories is to Bertie Wooster in "Jeeves Takes Charge". In the story, she wants Bertie to steal his uncle's memoirs. Initially, Bertie is attracted by her beautiful profile, but starts to have doubts about her when she expects him to read the difficult book Types of Ethical Theory. She also plans to make him read Nietzsche. By the end of that story, he has realized that he finds her too overbearing and is glad that their engagement is over. He is unwilling to hurt a girl's feelings by turning her down, however, so he is in danger of becoming her fiancé again whenever she wants to renew their engagement. In Joy in the Morning, Zenobia "Nobby" Hopwood states her opinion that of all the men that Florence married, Bertie was the one she wanted most.

Florence gets engaged often in the stories, being quick to leave a fiancé if he fails in an undertaking or does not obey her wishes. At different times, she gets engaged to Bertie in "Jeeves Takes Charge", to Bertie and Stilton Cheesewright in Joy in the Morning, to Bertie, Stilton, and the playwright Percy Gorringe in Jeeves and the Feudal Spirit, and to Bertie and Harold "Ginger" Winship in Much Obliged, Jeeves. It is also mentioned, in Joy in the Morning, that she was once engaged to Boko Fittleworth. At one point, Bertie and his Aunt Dahlia jokingly suppose that, since Florence has been engaged to so many people, her former fiancés form clubs and societies, and call themselves the Old Florentians. At the end of the Jeeves canon, she is not married or engaged to anyone.

== Appearances ==
- Carry On, Jeeves (1925)
  - "Jeeves Takes Charge" (1916)
- Joy in the Morning (1946)
- Jeeves and the Feudal Spirit (1954)
- Much Obliged, Jeeves (1971)

== Types of Ethical Theory ==
When Florence Craye is first engaged to Bertie Wooster in the short story "Jeeves Takes Charge", she has him read a difficult book called Types of Ethical Theory. This is a real 1885 book written by philosopher James Martineau, published in two volumes. Bertie provides two abstruse quotes from the book, with only a few slight changes (mostly in punctuation) from Martineau's text. First, in "Jeeves Takes Charge", Bertie provides the following quote, nearly identical to a passage in the second volume of Types of Ethical Theory:

"The postulate or common understanding involved in speech is certainly co-extensive, in the obligation it carries, with the social organism of which language is the instrument, and the ends of which it is an effort to subserve."

Bertie uses this quote to illustrate Florence's intellectual and domineering nature, since she is apparently compelling him to read this work to make him more scholarly like her and expects him to finish this book within a week. In the same short story, Bertie provides the following quote, which is nearly identical to a different passage in the first volume of Types of Ethical Theory, as another jarring example of the book's content which ultimately drives him away from Florence, and repeats this second quote in Joy in the Morning:

"Of the two antithetic terms in the Greek philosophy one only was real and selfsubsisting; that is to say, Ideal Thought as opposed to that which it has to penetrate and mould. The other, corresponding to our Nature, was in itself phenomenal, unreal, without any permanent footing, having no predicates that held true for two moments together; in short, redeemed from negation only by including indwelling realities appearing through."

After repeating this quote, Bertie says to the reader, "Right. You will have got the idea, and will, I think, be able to understand why the sight of her made me give at the knees somewhat."

== Adaptations ==
Television

- In the 1990–1993 television series Jeeves and Wooster, Florence was portrayed by Fiona Gillies in series 3 (1992), and Francesca Folan in series 4 (1993). In this adaptation, Florence is also the niece of Sir Watkyn Bassett, which was not the case in the original stories.

Radio

- Florence was voiced by Avril Elgar in the 1958 Caedmon recording of "Jeeves Takes Charge".
- In the 1973–1981 series What Ho! Jeeves, Florence was voiced by Bronwen Williams (Joy in the Morning) and Liza Goddard (Jeeves and the Feudal Spirit).

== See also ==
- List of Jeeves characters, an alphabetical list of Jeeves characters
- List of P. G. Wodehouse characters in the Jeeves stories, a categorized outline of Jeeves characters
- List of Jeeves and Wooster characters, a list of characters in the television series

== Bibliography ==
- Cawthorne, Nigel (2013). A Brief Guide to Jeeves and Wooster. Constable & Robinson. ISBN 978-1-78033-824-8.
- Garrison, Daniel H. (1991) [1989]. Who's Who in Wodehouse (Revised ed.). Constable & Robinson. ISBN 1-55882-087-6.
- Martineau, James (1885). Types of Ethical Theory: Volume 1. Oxford University Press.
- Martineau, James (1886). Types of Ethical Theory: Volume 2 (Second ed.). Macmillan and Co.
- Ring, Tony; Jaggard, Geoffrey (1999). Wodehouse in Woostershire. Porpoise Books. ISBN 1-870-304-19-5.
- Wodehouse, P. G. (2008) [1925]. Carry On, Jeeves (Reprinted ed.). Arrow Books. ISBN 978-0099513698.
- Wodehouse, P. G. (2008) [1947]. Joy in the Morning (Reprinted ed.). Arrow Books. ISBN 978-0099513766.
- Wodehouse, P. G. (2008) [1954]. Jeeves and the Feudal Spirit (Reprinted ed.). Arrow Books. ISBN 978-1-78033-824-8.
