= The White Feather =

1907 novel by P. G. Wodehouse

- First edition
- Author: P. G. Wodehouse
- Language: English
- Publisher: A & C Black
- Publication date: 9 October 1907
- Publication place: United Kingdom
- Media type: Print

The White Feather is a novel by P. G. Wodehouse, first published on 9 October 1907 by A & C Black, London. It is set at Wrykyn school, scene of Wodehouse's earlier book The Gold Bat (1904), and the later Mike (1909). Like many early Wodehouse novels, the story first appeared as a serial in the boys' magazine The Captain, between October 1905 and March 1906. The phrase "white feather" is a reference to cowardice.

In the novel, Sheen, a quiet and studious boy, finds himself facing a street brawl between boys of Wrykyn and a gang of local toughs. He slips away to safety, but his cowardliness is noticed by his fellows, who ostracize him. He trains secretly under boxing legend Joe Bevan, hoping to restore his honour in the boxing ring.

== Plot ==
Sheen, a studious and inconspicuous member of the Sixth form at Wrykyn, and his friend Drummond, a more popular student and boxer, go to the nearby town. They come across a fight in progress between Wrykyn students and some local boys over the upcoming election for the town's mayor. Drummond joins in the fight to help the Wrykyn side, but Sheen runs away. Drummond disapproves of Sheen running away and shuns Sheen later, but does not reveal to the other students that Sheen fled. However, Stanning, another boxer and Sheen's rival for the in-school Gotford scholarship, saw Sheen run and tells others about it. The students in Sheen's house, Seymour's, believe Sheen disgraced the house with his cowardice, and punish him by acting as if he does not exist. Sheen feels isolated and wants to restore his reputation.

Sheen goes back to the town with the idea of fighting the town hooligans and regaining his honour, but is easily defeated. Joe Bevan, a boxing trainer and former champion, breaks up the fight and saves Sheen from being seriously injured. Impressed with Sheen's determination, Joe suggests that Sheen start training with him to learn boxing. Sheen starts his lessons with Joe at the Blue Boar, an inn up the river Severn. That area of the river has been designated out of bounds for students who live at the school. Sheen secretly goes to the pub using a boat on the river. He is eager to learn from Joe and becomes more confident as he improves. One day while he is at the inn, his boat disappears as a result of the feud between the boys in the school and those in town. Sheen gets help going to and from the pub from Jack Bruce, a modest day-boy at Wrykyn who is still friends with Sheen and drives a car.

Sheen wins the Gotford scholarship, though this does little to impress his house. Seymour's has not had a successful athletic season, so Sheen hopes to win the approval of his house by winning the inter-house boxing competition for Seymour's. Drummond, who is considered the best boxer in the school, contracts mumps and is unable to compete for Seymour's. Sheen writes him a letter asking to take his place. Drummond doubts that Sheen can fight and denies his request, instead choosing Stanning to compete. Stanning wins the competition but then pretends he has a wrist injury so he will not have to compete in the inter-school boxing competition at Aldershot, since he is afraid of the tough competitor from Ripton School. Sheen is disappointed that he did not have the chance to redeem himself in the inter-house competition. Joe Bevan suggests that Sheen instead compete for Wrykyn at Aldershot. Sheen explains his situation to Mr Spence, a sympathetic schoolmaster who is in charge of some of the school sports. Mr Spence is initially concerned that Sheen would be seriously injured at Aldershot, but agrees to let him compete after Sheen demonstrates his skill to O'Hara, an Old Wrykinian and boxer visiting the school. Joe promises to go to Aldershot to give Sheen assistance and encouragement.

Sheen does well at the start of the competition, though he is disappointed Joe is not there. Sheen struggles in the final round against the competitor from Ripton until Joe appears and gives Sheen advice. Sheen wins and returns to Wrykyn. Seymour's holds a sort of court-martial against Sheen largely instigated by Stanning, but the house considers Sheen to be redeemed when they hear the surprising news that Sheen won the boxing competition at Aldershot. It is also pointed out that the house should not listen to Stanning since he is a member of Appleby's, not Seymour's. Mr Spence is obliged to report to the Headmaster that Sheen went out of bounds across the river for boxing training, but explains that Sheen had good reasons and tactfully refrains from mentioning that the training was conducted in a pub. Jack Bruce then tells the Headmaster that Sheen did not cross the river since he drove Sheen by car, so Sheen does not get in trouble for breaking bounds. Sheen is also friends with Drummond again.

== Publication history ==
The White Feather was serialised in The Captain in six parts from October 1905 to March 1906, with illustrations by T. M. R. Whitwell.

The book is dedicated, "To my brother Dick", and includes a short preface by Wodehouse. The first edition included twelve illustrations by William Townend. The American edition was issued by Macmillan, New York, in December 1907, from imported sheets. Macmillan issued another American edition from imported sheets in October 1922.

The story was included in The Gold Bat and Other Stories, published by Penguin Books in 1986.
