= The Adventures of Sally =

1922 novel by P. G. Wodehouse

- Author: P.G Wodehouse
- Language: English
- Genre: Humorous fiction
- Published: Herbert Jenkins Ltd.
- Publication date: 1922-10-17

First edition (UK)

The Adventures of Sally is a novel by P. G. Wodehouse. It appeared as a serial in Collier's magazine in the United States from 8 October to 31 December 1921, and in The Grand Magazine in the United Kingdom from April to July 1922.

It was first published in book form in the United Kingdom by Herbert Jenkins on 17 October 1922, and in the U.S. by George H. Doran on 23 March 1923, under the title Mostly Sally. It was serialised again, under this second title, in The Household Magazinez from November 1925 to April 1926.

The novel relates the adventures of Sally Nicholas, a young American woman who inherits a fortune of $25,000.

== Plot ==
Sally Nicholas is a young, pretty, and popular American woman who lives in a boarding house in New York and works as a taxi dancer. Upon reaching her twenty-first birthday, she inherits a considerable fortune. Sally tries to adjust to her new life, but financial and romantic problems beset her until a happy ending ensues.

== Reception ==
Wodehouse biographer Richard Usborne called The Adventures of Sally "a jerky, choppy book... Several short-story themes are tied up untidily together and there is a scrambling of loose ends to finish up."
