= The Prince and Betty =

1912 novel by P. G. Wodehouse

- First edition (US)
- Author: P. G. Wodehouse
- Language: English
- Genre: Comic novel
- Publisher: Watt (US); Mills & Boon (UK)
- Publication date: 14 February 1912 (US); 1 May 1912 (UK)
- Publication place: United Kingdom
- Media type: Print (hardback & paperback)

The Prince and Betty is a novel by P. G. Wodehouse. It was originally published in Ainslee's Magazine in the United States in January 1912, and, in a slightly different form, as a serial in Strand Magazine in the United Kingdom between February and April 1912. It was published in book form, in the United Kingdom by Mills & Boon on 1 May 1912. A substantially different version, which incorporated the plot of Psmith, Journalist, was published in the US by W.J. Watt & Company, New York on 14 February 1912.

== US novel version ==
The US novel version of The Prince and Betty combines the original story, transferred to a New York setting, with the plot of Psmith, Journalist, substantially rewritten to merge in the romance of John Maude (who becomes an American in this version) and Betty. The merged version contains thirty chapters, as opposed to the original’s twenty.

== Adaptations ==
=== Film ===
A silent, black-and-white film adaptation, also titled The Prince and Betty, was made in 1919. It was released Dec. 21, 1919.

== Plot of the 1919 film ==
Young American John Maude is forced to find employment when he falls in love with Betty Keith, a high society girl. (In the novel, she is called Betty Silver.) Maude accepts an offer to travel to the tiny island country of Mervo, where he is hired by millionaire Benjamin Scobell who is planning to build a casino there that will rival Monte Carlo. Scobell wants Maude to impersonate the missing Prince of Mervo as an attraction for his casino. Scobell also wants John to marry his stepdaughter, who coincidentally turns out to be Betty Keith. When Betty accuses John of being an impostor, John shuts down the casino and tries to stage a revolution that will make Mervo a democratic state. The natives do not go along, but the President of Mervo returns to operate the casino personally, and Betty and John head off to America together.

== Cast ==
- Wilton Taylor as Benjamin Scobell, a wealthy and unscrupulous financier
- Mary Thurman as Betty Keith/ Betty Silver, Scobell's attractive stepdaughter
- William Desmond as John Maude, unwitting heir to a princedom, long admired by Betty
- Anita Kay as Mrs. Wheldon
- George Swann as Reggie Hayling
- Walter Peng as the President of Mervo
- William Levaull as Crump
- Frank Lanning as the shepherd
- Boris Karloff in a bit part

=== Radio ===
A musical comedy adaptation of The Prince and Betty under the title Meet the Prince was first broadcast by the BBC in January 1934. The story was adapted and produced by John Watt and the music was by Kenneth Leslie-Smith, with lyrics by Henrik Ege and orchestral arrangements by Sydney Baynes. The cast included Esmond Knight as John Maude, Polly Walker as Della Morrison, Adele Dixon as Betty Silver, Ewart Scott as Lord Arthur Hayling, Sydney Keith as Mr Morrison, Bernard Ansell as Edwin Crump, Davy Burnaby as Benjamin Scobel, Floy Penrhyn as Marian Scobel, and C. Denier Warren as General Poineau.

It was broadcast in the BBC Regional Programme on 1 January 1934 and repeated the next day in the BBC National Programme. A second production was broadcast on 28 September 1936 in the National Programme and repeated the following day in the Regional Programme.
