= Lispeth =

1886 short story by Rudyard Kipling

"Lispeth" is a short story by Rudyard Kipling. It was first published in the Civil and Military Gazette on 29 November 1886; its first appearance in book form was in the first Indian edition of Plain Tales from the Hills in 1888, and it later appeared in subsequent editions of that collection. The tale is an interesting example of Kipling's attitudes to different races and cultures, which is less simple than many accounts of his beliefs allow.

== Authorship ==
Rudyard's sister Alice "Trix" Kipling may have been involved in the writing of some of the stories in Plain Tales from the Hills, including "Lispeth": "As is widely acknowledged by Kipling scholars, Alice was a prime contributor to previous Kipling collection, among them Echoes (1884) and Quartette (1885)...In "Trix—The Other Kipling" (Kipling Journal, September 2014), Barbara Fisher...speculates that signs of Trix’s sensibility can be found in 'Lispeth', 'Three– and an Extra', 'Miss Youghal’s Sais', 'Bitters Neat', 'Yoked to an Unbeliever', 'False Dawn' and 'Cupid’s Arrow[sic]" (48). In all of these stories, Fisher locates central narrative strands concerning unrequited love, unhappy marriages, star-crossed lovers, and unhappy maidens—themes, as noted above, that concerned the eighteen-year old Alice more as they concerned Rudyard less." An anonymous article published in The Youth's Companion in 1924 also hints at this: “Rudyard Kipling was so seldom in Simla that I have always felt convinced that his sister helped him a great deal in the ground work of his tales and ditties; she had a more intimate knowledge than he of Simla and its society."

== Plot summary ==
The story is set in Kotgarh, a valley about 55 miles (89 km) by road from Simla, the "summer seat of the British Government of India". It is the home of Sonoo and his wife Jadeh, who, after the maize fails and bears raid their opium poppy field, turn Christian. Their daughter is Elizabeth, or 'Lispeth' in "the Hill or Pahari pronunciation." Cholera kills Sonoo and Jadeh, and Lispeth becomes servant/companion to the Chaplain's wife at Kotgarh. She grows very lovely, "a stately goddess, five feet ten in her shoes." One day on her walk ( "little constitutionals...between Kotgarth and Narkunda" consisting between 20–30 miles (32–48 km) says Kipling, with fine irony and huge admiration of the hill people) she finds an unconscious Englishman whom she carries back to the Mission, announcing that she has found her husband. This scandalises the Chaplain and his wife, and they "lectured her severely on the impropriety of her conduct."

The stranger, a traveler hunting plants and butterflies, recovers. He enjoys flirting with Lispeth, although he is engaged to an English "girl at Home." When he decides to leave Kotgarh to return to England, the Chaplain's wife advises the Englishman to tell Lispeth that he will marry her. Of course, the Englishman does not return, and after three months of Lispeth's waiting and weeping, the Chaplain's wife tells her the truth, saying "it was 'wrong and improper' of Lispeth to think of marriage with an Englishman, who was of a superior clay..." Upon learning that she has been deceived by the Englishman and the Chaplain's wife, Lispeth returns to live among her own people, marrying a wood-cutter "who beat her after the manner of paharis." In response to Lispeth's rejection of Christianity the Chaplain's wife concludes: "'There is no law whereby you can account for the vagaries of the heathen...and I believe that Lispeth was always at heart an infidel.” At this point in the story the 'native' is shown as honest, simple and admirable, and it is the Christians who are the hypocrites and liars. It is not quite as simple as that: Kipling also suggests that he has heard this story from Lispeth herself, who "when she was sufficiently drunk, could sometimes be induced to tell the story of her first love-affair" - which may seem a rather patronising European attitude to 'the natives.'

== The Woman of Shamlegh in Kim ==
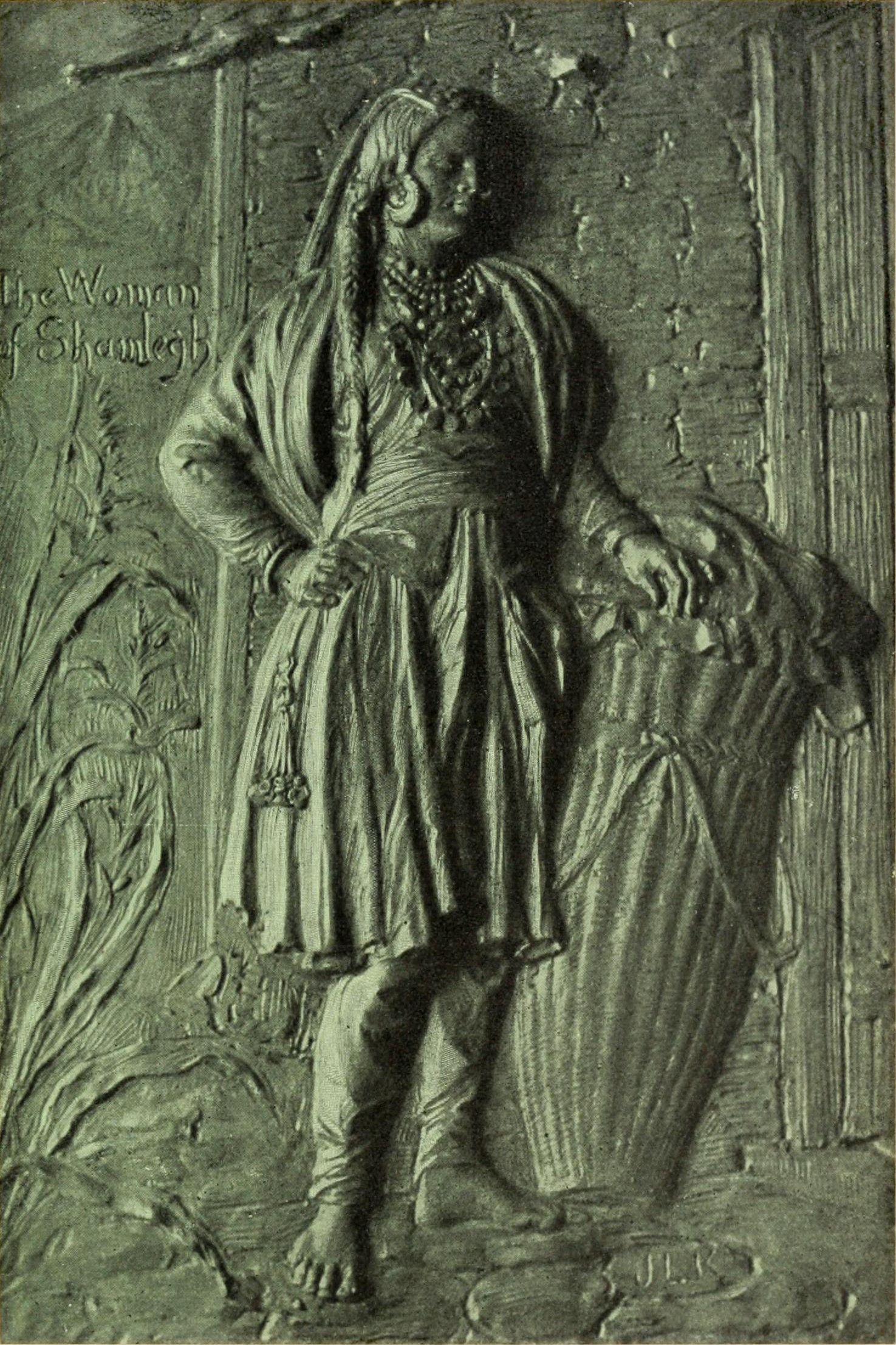
"The Woman of Shamlegh," John Lockwood Kipling, 1901.

An anonymous review of Kim published in the Yale Literary Magazine in 1901 suggested that the character of the Woman of Shamlegh in Kipling's novel might be Lispeth: "The Hill woman who helps Kim and the Holy man may be none other than Lispeth, whom we knew in 'Plain Tales from the Hills.' For she too, when a girl at the mission house, had nursed back to health a 'Sahib' who said he would return and wed her, but never did return. So she had gone back to her people. But, though lost to the 'Ker-lis-te-ans,' if she is indeed Lispeth, still in 'Kim' by service does she 'acquire merit beyond all others.'" Information on the Kipling Society's website gives a similar interpretation: "She next appears in Kim as the 'Woman of Shamlegh', and makes unsuccessful overtures to him although he does give her a kiss on the cheek. This is an interesting link between Kipling’s first book on India and his last and somewhat of a contradiction in the fate of Lispeth in this story and her more successful life in Kim, where Lockwood Kipling’s illustration shows her as a well-built and obviously prosperous woman."

In Narratives of Empire: The Fictions of Rudyard Kipling Zohreh T. Sullivan argues: "Sexually exploited and abandoned, [Lispeth] suggests the larger betrayal of the Indians by their colonizers (McClure 1981 : 75-6). Kim will refuse her sexual invitation, not only to show his moral superiority over callous Sahibs, but also to prove that he has passed a crucial test of colonial manhood–the denial of sexuality."

== Critical response ==
In 1890 The Atlanta Constitution published "Lispeth" in their newspaper and wrote that it "has a good deal of the cynicism with which Mr. Kipling is credited." An anonymous review of Plain Tales for the Hills published in The Derby Mercury in 1899 made mention of "Lispeth": "the author illustrates one of the difficulties of missionary work."

An anonymous letter entitled "Mr. Kipling's Theology," published in The Outlook in 1900 argued that: "both Lispeth and Ameera [another Kipling character] exemplify true feminine devotion, and none the less perfectly because they are heathen."

Bhupal Singh argues that "the same cynical attitude of Kipling towards missionaries is illustrated in the return of the heart-broken Lispeth to her ancestral gods. The satire, however, spoils this story, which is essentially tragic."

Harold Bloom argues that "while the denser of [Kipling's] contemporary English readers might have overlooked the irony and simply interpreted [Lispeth] as either an affirmation of their beliefs on miscegenation and the "White Man's Burden" or a quaint tragedy about true love lost, perceptive readers were forced to ask themselves just what good the missionaries brought to this girl's life and whether the same holds true for the imperialist enterprise as a whole."

Shahin Kuli Khan Khattak praises the story for its message, while acknowledging the inaccuracy of Kipling's depiction of Lispeth's behavior with the Englishman: “The moral of the tale is laudable, notwithstanding the fact that Indian girls of all religions are very demure in their attitude to marriage, and would seldom have behaved as depicted."

Dane Kennedy argues that "Kipling panders in this story to the British Indian community's widespread distrust of missionaries, who were accused of fostering expectations of equality on the part of indigenous peoples that were bound to cause disappointment and discontent. At the same time, however, he offers a far more sweeping commentary on the relationship between the British and the inhabitants of the hills. Lispeth serves as the symbol of a paradisiacal people who are too simple, too gentle, too fragile to survive the encounter with the West."
