= Putaway =

Putaway or Put away or Put-away may refer to:

- Putaway in Transportation and Warehouse Management, the process of storying goods
- Putaway, a type of shot in sports such as:
  - Pickleball
  - Tennis
- The Putaway Man, a character in the Bonobono managa series

== See also ==
- Thrown Away
