= Kidnapped =

Kidnapped may refer to:

- subject to the crime of kidnapping

== Literature ==
- Kidnapped (novel), an 1886 novel by Robert Louis Stevenson
- Kidnapped (comics), a 2007 graphic novel adaptation of R. L. Stevenson's novel by Alan Grant and Cam Kennedy
- "Kidnapped" (short story), by Rudyard Kipling, 1887
- Kidnapped, a 2006 book series by Gordon Korman

== Film ==
- Kidnapped (1917 film), a silent film based on R. L. Stevenson's novel
- Kidnapped (1935 film), a Danish film
- Kidnapped (1938 film), based on R. L. Stevenson's novel
- Kidnapped (1948 film), based on R. L. Stevenson's novel
- Kidnapped (1960 film), a Disney film based on R. L. Stevenson's novel
- Kidnapped (1971 film), with Michael Caine, based on R. L. Stevenson's novel
- Kidnapped (1986 film), an animation, based on R. L. Stevenson's novel
- Kidnapped (1987 film), a film directed by Howard Avedis
- Kidnapped (1995 film), a TV film based on R. L. Stevenson's novel
- Kidnapped (2010 film), a Spanish film
- Kidnapped (2023 film), an Italian-Franco-German film
- Kidnapped: The Hannah Anderson Story, a 2015 film about the Kidnapping of Hannah Anderson
- Kidnapped: In the Line of Duty, a 1995 American TV film
- Kidnapped, an alternative title for the Italian film Rabid Dogs

== Television ==
=== Shows ===
- Kidnapped (American TV series), an NBC drama show
- Kidnapped (1978 miniseries), based on R. L. Stevenson's novel, starring David McCallum
- Kidnapped (2005 TV series), based on R. L. Stevenson's novel
- Kidnapped: The Chloe Ayling Story, a 2024 television series

=== Episodes ===
- "Kidnapped", a 1960 episode of Four Feather Falls
- "Kidnapped", a 1970 episode of The Doris Day Show
- "Kidnapped", a 1978 episode of Dallas season 2
- "Kidnapped" (Dynasty)", a 1985 episode
- "Kidnapped", a 1990 episode of Zorro (1990)
- "Kidnapped!" (Jeeves and Wooster), a 1991 episode
- "Kidnapped" (Beavis and Butt-Head), a 1993 episode
- "Kidnapped", a 1997 episode of Captain Butler
- "Kidnapped", a 1997 episode of ChuckleVision
- "Kidnapped", a 2000 episode of Pacific Blue
- "Kidnapped", a 2000 episode of The Huntress
- "Kidnapped", a 2004 episode of Help! I'm a Teenage Outlaw
- "Kidnapped" (Static Shock), a 2004 episode
- "Kidnapped!", a 2006 episode of Frisky Dingo
- "Kidnapped" (Star Wars: The Clone Wars), a 2011 episode
- "Kidnapped", a 2013 episode of Beauty & the Beast (2012) season 2

== Theatre ==
- Kidnapped (play), a 2023 play based on R. L. Stevenson’s novel

== See also ==
- Kidnapping (disambiguation)
- Kidnap (disambiguation)
- Kidnapper (disambiguation)
