= Robert Hanham Collyer =

British physician, phrenologist, mesmerist, lecturer, author, and inventor

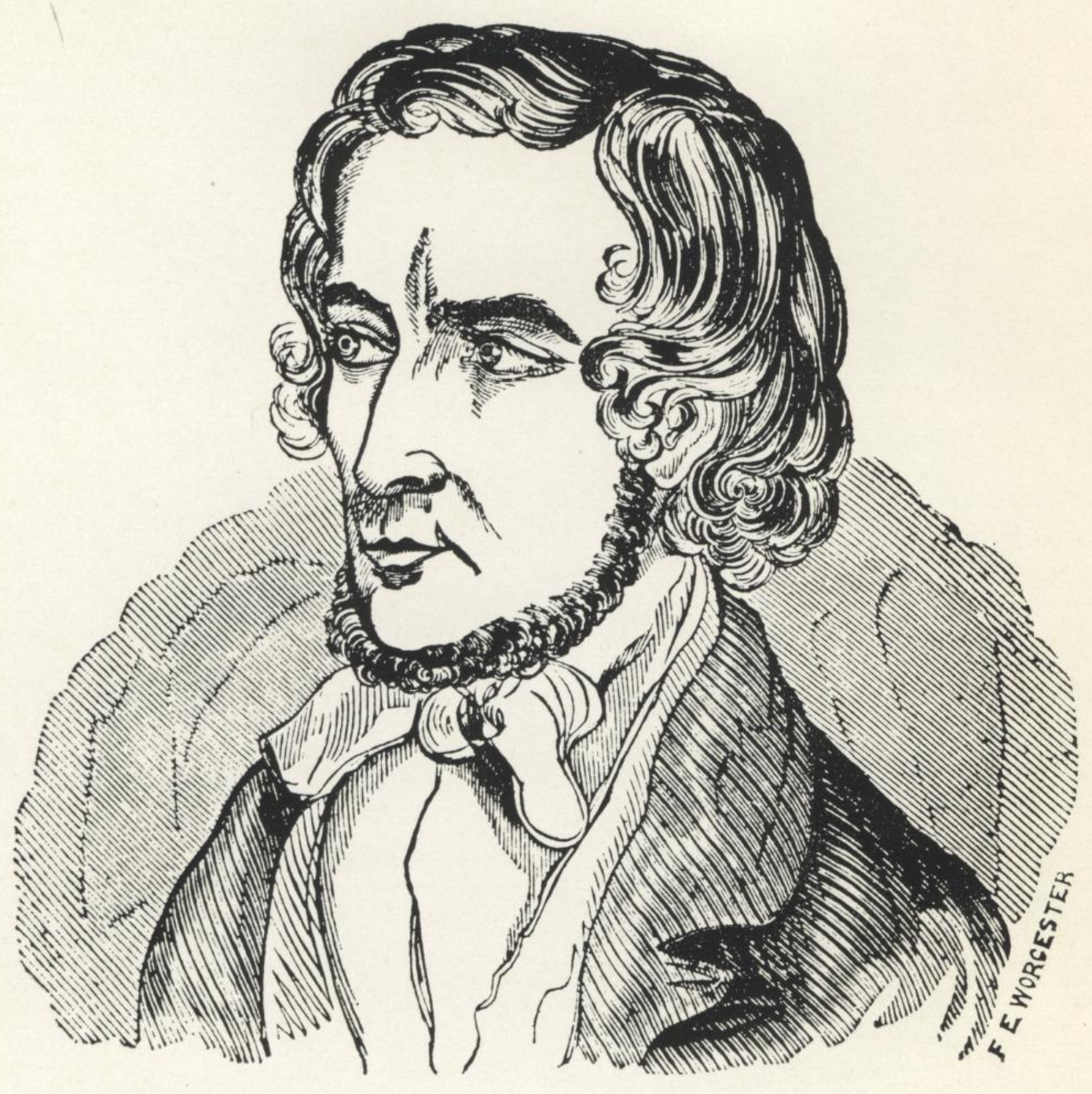
- Robert Hanham Collyer
- Born: 1814; St Helier, Jersey
- Died: c. 1891; New Orleans, US
- Occupations: Physician, phrenologist, mesmerist, lecturer, author, inventor
- Years active: 19th-century

Robert Hanham Collyer (1814 – c. 1891) was a British physician, phrenologist, mesmerist, lecturer, author, and inventor mostly active on the east coast of America and Canada during the 19th-century.

Collyer was known for his showmanship and became a popular traveling lecturer. In 1839, he discovered, conceived, and promoted the practice of "phreno-magnetism", but relinquished his claims as mistaken by mid-1843.

He was also involved in a number of scandals and rivalries, including a claim that he originated inhalation anesthesia for surgery before William T. G. Morton, who is generally credited with the discovery.

== Early life ==
Robert Hanham Collyer was born in St Helier, Jersey to Ann Du Jardin (1796-1879), and Robert Mitchell Collyer (1787-1859), although details of his early life are hazy.

== Phrenology ==
He studied phrenology under Johann Gaspar Spurzheim in Paris; and, then, attended classes at London University, where he studied medicine with John Elliotson — the founder and first President of the London Phrenological Society, and an early advocate of mesmerism in England (and, later, joint editor of The Zoist: A Journal of Cerebral Physiology & Mesmerism, and Their Applications to Human Welfare) — for at least two years, but did not go on to graduate.

In March 1836, aged 22, he and his parents and siblings migrated to America, where he traveled along the east coast of the United States and Canada giving lectures on phrenology. In-between lecturing he received the standard "quickie" degree from Berkshire Medical College. After receiving his degree, and having been mesmerized by Dr T. Cleaveland in October 1839, Collyer became more and more interested in mesmerism, and added mesmeric demonstrations to his lecture circuit.

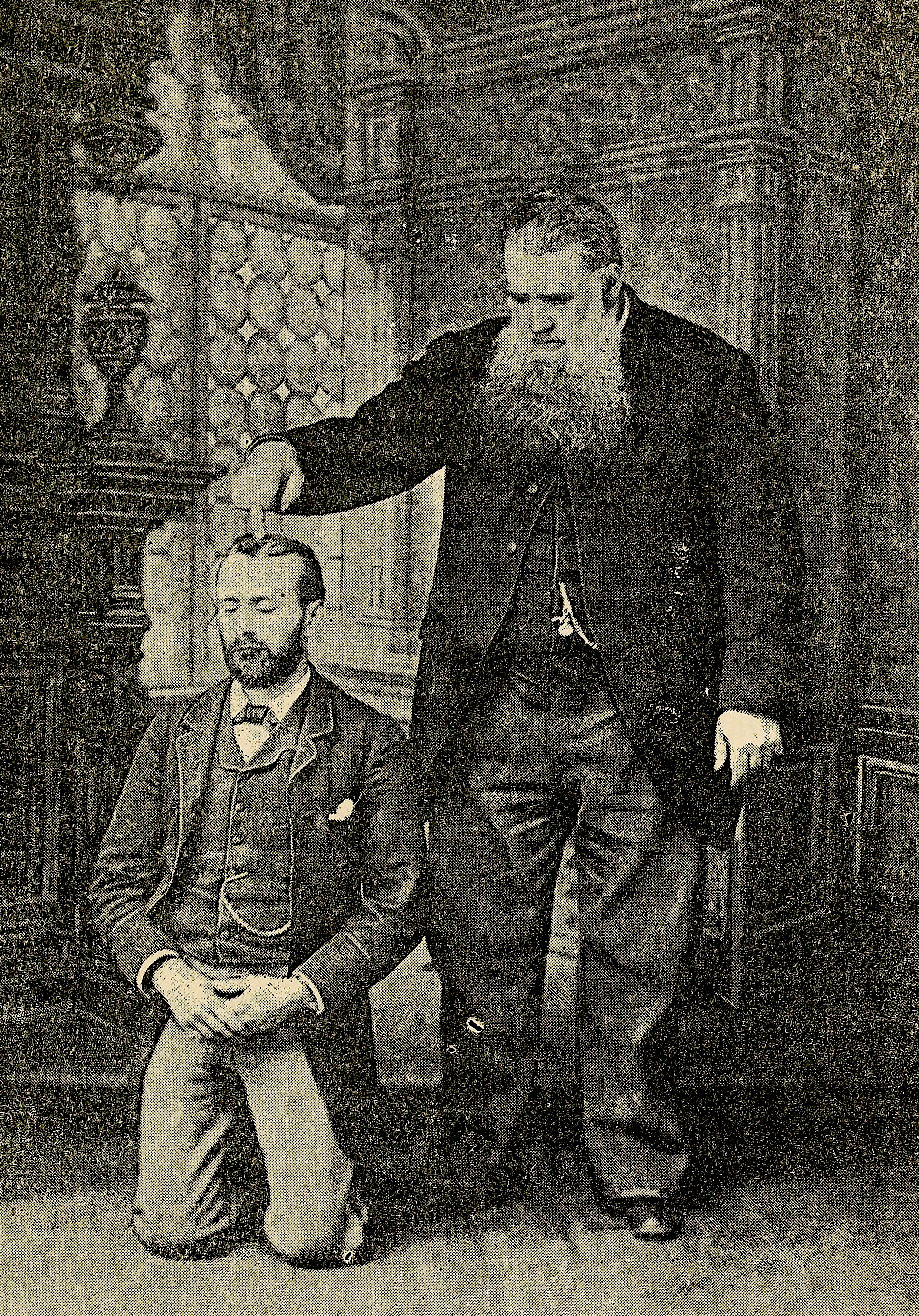
A Phreno-Magnetist "Exciting the Organ of Veneration" (c. 1887)

== Phreno-magnetism ==
He also began serving as editor of Mesmeric Magazine; and, in 1839, he discovered, and began to develop what he called "phreno-magnetism"; a practice which aimed to activate specific "phrenological organs" through mesmeric influence, or animal magnetism. (Note: As Lindsay B. Yeates observes, "The principal consequence of ... [Collyer's] apparent blending of the disparate practices ... of mesmerism and phrenology ... was that, to supporters of both sides, the theoretical correctness of each ‘science’ was now confirmed by the other; [and,] further, in phreno-mesmerism, many saw a long overdue return to the metaphysical domain from which Gall's materialist and mechanistic system of organology seemed to have diverted all and sundry.")

=== Other claimants ===
Prior to Collyer's later retraction of the claimed "discovery" in 1842, two others claimed to have independently confirmed the veracity of Collyer's discovery: architect Henry George Atkinson (1812-c.1890), a Fellow of the Geological Society at London, in November 1841; and chemist Charles Blandford Mansfield (1819-1849) at Cambridge in December 1841.

One of Collyer's rivals, La Roy Sunderland, also claimed to have independently discovered the same phenomena in 1841. However, like Collyer, he later relinquished his claims.

=== Clashes with rivals ===
He also frequently clashed with rival phrenological-mesmerists La Roy Sunderland and Joseph Rodes Buchanan.

== Mesmerism ==
Eventually Collyer mostly abandoned phrenology — especially, his own ideas of phreno-magnetism — and focused exclusively on mesmerism by mid-1843.

Other mesmerists such as K. Dickerson, and Phineas Parkhurst Quimby, who got their start after seeing a lecture by Collyer, were also inspired by him. Many thought of him as "the Champion of Mesmerism in America", a view which he encouraged. Public opinion of Collyer varied so widely and was so antithetical that one historian believed there were two Robert H. Collyers — "the one a respected visiting scientist from England, the other an impostor following his trail and trading on his reputation" — lecturing on mesmerism, though this is unlikely.

External images
- "Robert H. Collyer MD putting Mons. de Bonneville in the Mesmeric of Magnetic State, Boston, 17th. May 1842", a silhouette portrait of Collyer and Louis C.H. de Bonneville, by Auguste Edouart in the National Portrait Gallery, Smithsonian Institution.
- Entry for Robert Hanham Collyer in the U.K. Medical Register of 1869 (p.92).
- Entry for Robert Hanham Collyer in the U.K. Medical Register of 1877 (p.147).

== Notoriety ==
In February 1843, the phrenologist Orson Squire Fowler, noting that Collyer, the "notorious and in every way immoral Phrenologist, and magnetizer" had just returned to the US "from Canada, where his gross and flagrant crimes [had driven] him last summer", warned phrenologists and magnetizers "to give him no countenance, because he is utterly destitute of moral principle". Collyer countered with a libel suit; which prompted Fowler to appeal for the assistance of the phrenologist "lovers of morality and virtue" in providing supportive evidence of Collyer's "immorality and vice".

Collyer was known for his showmanship and self-promotion. For instance, one of his tours of the southern United States involved a cast of nearly naked artists in painted body stockings.

He was also known for a very public scandal in which his wife was found in bed with another man, in Louisville, Kentucky, on September 25, 1838: the eminent English novelist Captain Marryat, author of The Children of the New Forest, and Mr Midshipman Easy.

Collyer married another woman without divorcing his first wife, making him guilty of bigamy.

== Edgar Allan Poe ==
Collyer knew Edgar Allan Poe, and was one of those who believed Poe's short story "The Facts in the Case of M. Valdemar" to be factual. On December 16, 1845, Collyer wrote to Poe saying he had accomplished similar feats as the fictional mesmerist in the story. Collyer had more likely revived his own patient, a drunken sailor, by means of a cold bath and prolonged massage.

== Inventor ==
Collyer was also a prolific inventor, with a list of patents which ranged from a method for crushing quartz, ways to manufacture paper products, and a new covering for electric telegraph cables. He also said he invented an improved breech loading cannon, but no patent information is available.

=== Ether ===
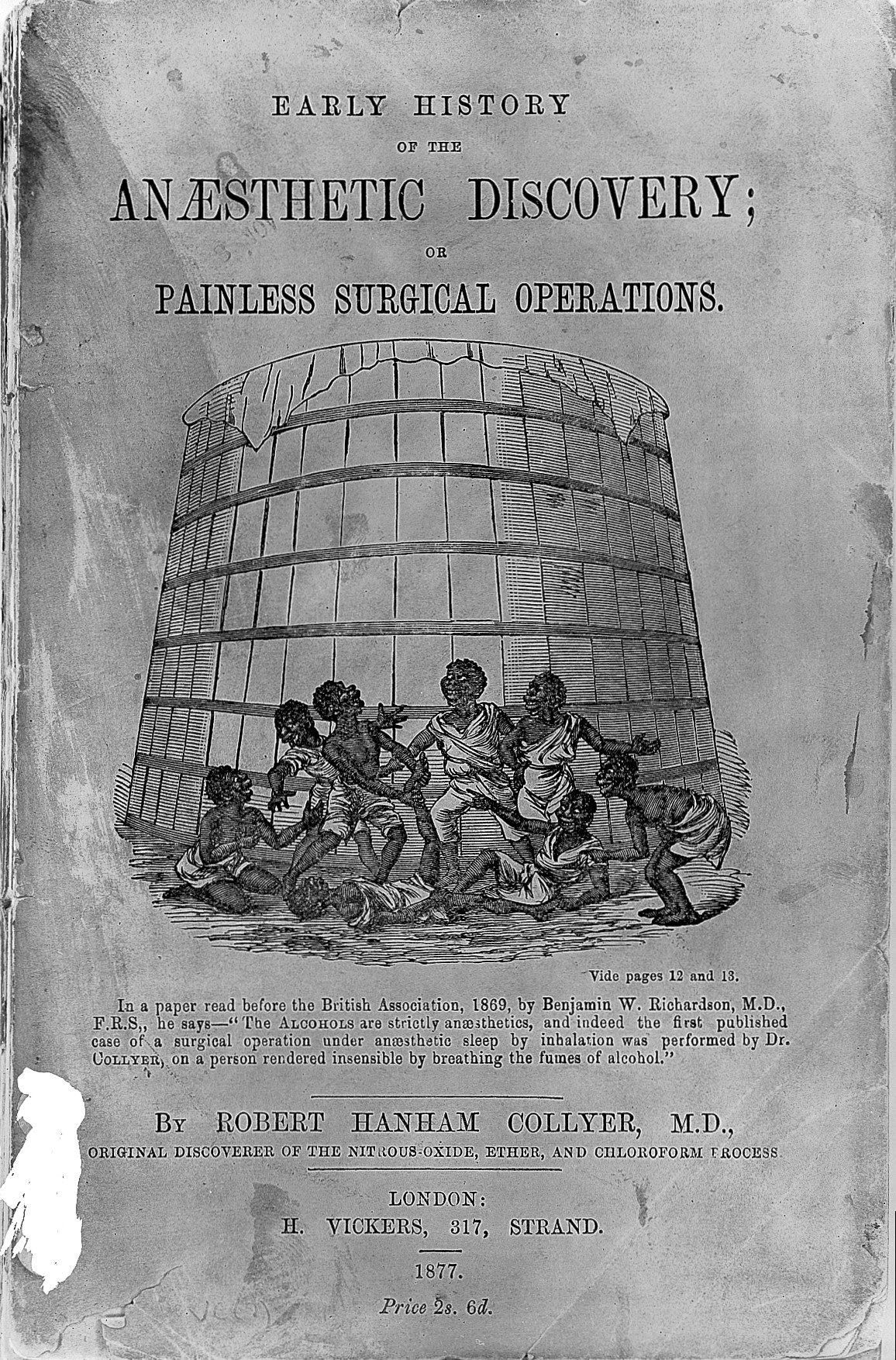
Collyer's book Early History of the Anaesthetic Discovery (1877) where he again credited himself with the discovery of anesthesia

Collyer claimed to have invented ether for anesthesia before William T. G. Morton, who is generally credited with the discovery, but Collyer never produced evidence of his claims. Collyer was not the only claimant to the invention, which was very much in demand to the point that Congress considered a $100,000 reward for a method of painless surgery.

Despite most in the medical profession dismissing his involvement, The Lancet gave credit to Collyer for the invention in 1868 and 1870, even though they too had dismissed the idea in 1847. However, it is likely that the author of at least the 1868 article giving Collyer credit was Collyer himself writing under a pen name.

== Later years ==
Eventually Collyer turned to more conventional medicine, and Taylor Stoehr writes that "the anesthesia controversy of 1847 was the last major pseudo-scientific effort of his career" as far as medicine was concerned, although he "never turned his back on the pseudo-science of the psyche".

He practiced medicine for some time in Jersey, joined the California Gold Rush, and was in charge of a cholera hospital in Mexico before returning to England to focus on his more profitable inventions.

Collyer occasionally wrote for publications such as The Spiritualist Magazine, and publicly defended the medium Henry Slade who had been convicted of fraud.

=== The Foxhall Jaw ===
He acquired a jawbone known as the "Foxhall Jaw" in 1863, and promoted it as "the oldest relic of the human animal now in existence"; but archeologists disputed the claim.

== Death ==
Collyer seems to have died sometime around 1891 in New Orleans, although like his early life, the end of his life is hazy.

== Selected writings ==
- 1835: A Manual of Phrenology, or the Physiology of the Human Brain, New York: J. Booth & Son.
- 1838: A Manual of Phrenology, or the Physiology of the Human Brain: Embracing a Full Description of the Phrenological Organs, their Exact Location, and the Peculiarities of Character produced by their various Degrees of Development and Combination (Fourth Edition), Cincinnati: N.G Burgess & Co.
- 1838: Lights and Shadows of American Life, Boston: Brainard & Co.
- 1843: Psychography, or, The Embodiment of Thought; with an Analysis of Phrenomagnetism, "Neurology," and Mental Hallucination, including Rules to Govern and Produce the Magnetic State, Philadelphia: Zieber & Co.
- 1844: Lights and Shadows of American Life, New York: Burgess & Stringer.
- 1847: "Inhalation of Narcotic Vapour", The Lancet, Vol.49, No.1219, (9 January 1847), pp. 50–51.
- 1855: "The Lost Gold Dust (Letter to the Editor)", The Sydney Morning Herald, (Tuesday, May 29, 1855), p. 5.
- 1862: "Phrenography", The Spiritual Magazine, Vol.3, No.2, (February 1862), pp. 49–57.
- 1867: "The Fossil Human Jaw from Suffolk", The Anthropological Review, Vol.5, No.17, (April 1867), pp. 221–229.
- 1868: History of the Anaesthetic Discovery by the Discoverer, Robert Hanham Collyer, Doctor of Medicine, Bruges: Edward Gailliard & Co.
- 1871: Mysteries of the Vital Element: In Connexion with Dreams, Somnambulism, Trance, Vital Photography, Faith and Will, Anæsthesia, Nervous Congestion and Creative Function: Modern Spiritualism Explained (Second Edition), London: Henry Renshaw.
- 1871: Review of the "Lancet's" Article on the History of Anaesthetic Discovery: by the original discoverer, Robert H. Collyer, M.D., London: Plackett & Co.
- 1871: Reply to Professor Allen Thomson's address as President of the Biological Section at the British Association held in Edinburgh, August, 1871, London : Robert H. Collyer.
- 1873: Exalted States of the Nervous System: In Explanation of the Mysteries of Modern Spiritualism, Dreams, Trance, Somnambulism, Vital Photography, Faith, Will, Origin of Life, Anæsthesia, and Nervous Congestion (Third Edition), London: Henry Renshaw.
- 1876: Automatic Writing: The Slade Prosecution: Vindication of the Truth, London: H. Vickers.
- 1876: "Test Seances with Dr. Slade", The Spiritualist, and Journal of Psychological Science, Vol.9, No.224, (8 December 1876), p. 222.
- 1877: Early History of the Anæsthetic Discovery; Painless Surgical Operations, London: H. Vickers.

== Selected patents ==
- 1854: US Patent, No.10,388 (3 January 1854): Improvement in Quartz-Pulverizers.
- 1854: English Patent, No.919 (21 April 1854): Improved Machinery for Crushing or Triturating Hard Substances.
- 1854: US Patent, No.11,034 (6 June 1854): Gold-Amalgamator.
- 1856: English Patent, No.2442 (18 October 1856): Improved Method of Manufacturing Paper.
- 1857: English Patent, No.819 (24 March 1857): Improved Machine for Cleaning and Purifying Wheat and other Grain.
- 1857: English Patent, No.1578 (5 June March 1857): An Improved Mode of preparing the Residue of Beetroot, Mangel Wurtzel, and other Species of the Genus Betâ left in Sugar-Making and Distillation, to be used as Material in Making Paper, Paper Maché, Millboard, and other similar Manufactures.
- 1858: English Patent, No.1820 (10 August 1858): An Improved Coating Composition to Protect Vessels from Marine, Animal, and Vegetable Substances.
- 1859: English Patent, No.550 (2 March 1859): A Process of Preparing Material for the Manufacture of Paper, and a Machine employed therein, which Machine is applicable for Crushing, Grinding, Bruising, and Reducing various Substances.
- 1859: English Patent, No.2771 (7 December 1859): A Chemical Ink Pencil or Composition applicable as an Instrument or Means for Writing, Drawing, and Marking.
- 1860: English Patent, No.564 (29 February 1860): Improvements in the Manufacture of Pulp, and in Preparing Materials for the Purpose, and in Apparatuses Employed Therein, Part of the Invention being also Applicable to Preparing Materials for Fibrous and Textile Manufacturing Purposes.
- 1860: English Patent, No.804 (28 March 1860): Improvements in the Manufacture of Pulp for Paper, Paper Maché, and other similar Uses, and in Apparatus Employed Therein, Part of the Invention being also Applicable to other Operations in which Materials have to be subjected to the Action of Liquids, Steam, and other Fluids.
- 1860: English Patent, No.1275 (23 May 1860): Improvements in the Manufacture of Tubes and Other Vessels and Other Articles, and in the Machinery and Apparatus Connected Therewith.
- 1860: English Patent, No.1329 (29 May 1860): Improvements in Telegraph Cables, also Applicable to other similar Purposes.
- 1863: English Patent, No.1 (1 January 1863): Improvements in the Method of and Apparatus for Preparing Materials for the Manufacture of Paper and Similar Purposes, Part of the Invention being also applicable to other Operations in which Materials are subjected to the Action of Hot Agents.
- 1864: English Patent, No.627 (12 March 1864): An Improved Apparatus and Process for the Conversion of Substances into Material for the Manufacture of Paper and Textile Purposes.
- 1889: US Patent, No.397,536 (12 February 1889): Machine for Decorticating Fibrous Plants.
- 1889: US Patent, No.402,232 (30 April 1889): Machine for Delinting Cotton-Seed.
- 1889: US Patent, No.408,085 (30 July 1889): Cotton-Seed Cleaner.

== Sources ==
- Anon. (1839-10-17). "Lectures on Phrenology by Dr. R.H. Collyer". Manufacturers' & Farmers Journal and Providence and Pawtucket Advertiser. p. 1.
- Anon. (1843). The History and Philosophy of Animal Magnetism, etc (PDF). Boston: J. N. Bradley & co.
- Anon. (1848-05-20). "A Shameful and Disgusting Exhibition". New-Orleans Commercial Bulletin. p. 2.
- Anon. (1992). "'Valdemar' in Great Britain Once More". PSA Newsletter. 20 (1): 6. ISSN 1051-743X. JSTOR 43899841.
- Anon. "People – Robert Hanham Collyer". www.eapoe.org. Edgar Allan Poe Society of Baltimore.
- Atkinson, H.G. (1843), "On Mesmero-Phrenology, and the Function of the Cerebellum: Being a Paper Read at the Second Meeting of the Phrenological Association, July the 4th, 1843; Dr. Elliotson in the Chair", The Medical Times, Vol.8, No.202, (5 August 1843), pp.294-296; No.203, (12 August 1843), pp.308-311.
- Bader, Arno (Autumn 1936). "The Gallant Captain and Brother Jonathan". The Colophon, A Book Collectors' Quarterly. 2 (1): 114–129.
- Barnes, Nigel (2009). A Dream Within a Dream: The Life of Edgar Allan Poe. London; Chester Springs, PA: Peter Owen Publishers. ISBN 978-0-7206-1322-3.
- Collyer, R.H. (1842-06-13). "Public Sales: The Mesmeric Magazine, or Journal of Animal Magnetism (advertisement)". American & Commercial Daily Advertiser. p. 3.
- Collyer, R.H. (December 27, 1845). "(Letter, dated December 16, 1845, to Edgar Allan Poe)". The Broadway Journal. 2 (25): 390–391.
- Crabtree, Adam (1994). From Mesmer to Freud: Magnetic Sleep and the Roots of Psychological Healing. New Haven: Yale University Press. ISBN 978-0-300-05588-7.
- Davies, John Dunn (1955). Phrenology: Fad and Science: A 19th-century American Crusade. New Haven, CT: Yale University Press.
- Dickerson, K. (1843). The Philosophy of Mesmerism, or Animal Magnetism: Being a Compilation of Facts ascertained by Experience, and Drawn from the Writings of the most Celebrated Magnetisers in Europe and America. Concord, NH: Morrill, Silsby & Co.
- Elliotson, John (October 1843). "(Address to the Sixth Session of the Phrenological Association, July 3rd. 1843)". The Zoist: A Journal of Cerebral Physiology & Mesmerism, and Their Applications to Human Welfare. 1 (3): 227–246.
- Elliotson, John (April 1855). "On the claims of Dr. Robert H. Collyer in reference ..." The Zoist: A Journal of Cerebral Physiology & Mesmerism, and Their Applications to Human Welfare. 13 (49): 61–68.
- Fowler, O.S. (February 1843a). "Collyer". The American Phrenological Journal and Miscellany. 5 (2): 94–95.
- Fowler, O.S. (July 1843b). "Testimony Wanted — Witnesses cannot be prosecuted". The American Phrenological Journal and Miscellany. 5 (7): 331–332.
- Fuller, Robert C. (1982). Mesmerism and the American Cure of Souls. Philadelphia: University of Pennsylvania Press. ISBN 978-0-8122-7847-7.
- Gibbons, Peter D. (1964). "The Berkshire Medical Institution". Bulletin of the History of Medicine. 38 (1): 45–64. JSTOR 44449804. PMID 14104983.
- Lystra, Karen (1992). Searching the Heart: Women, Men, and Romantic Love in Nineteenth-Century America. New York: Oxford University Press. ISBN 978-0-1950-7476-5.
- Melton, J. Gordon (2009). Melton's Encyclopedia of American Religions (8 ed.). Detroit: Gale, Cengage Learning. ISBN 978-0-787-69696-2.
- Monod, David (2016). The Soul of Pleasure: Sentiment and Sensation in Nineteenth-Century American Mass Entertainment. Ithaca, NY: Cornell University Press. ISBN 978-1-5017-0238-9.
- Moore, Wendy (2017). The Mesmerist: The Society Doctor Who Held Victorian London Spellbound. London: Weidenfeld & Nicolson. ISBN 978-1-4746-0229-7.
- Morrison, Richard James (1849). "Charles Blandford Mansfield, Esq". Zadkiel's Magazine, or Record and Review of Astrology, Phrenology, Mesmerism, and Other Sciences. 1 (1): 110.
- Nygren, E.J (1970). "Rubens Peale's Experiments with Mesmerism". Proceedings of the American Philosophical Society. 114 (2): 100–108. JSTOR 986028.
- O'Connor, Bernard (2021). The Archaeological Impact of the 19th and 20th Century Fossil Diggings. Lulu. ISBN 978-1-291-40975-8.
- Osborn, Henry Fairfield (20 January 1922a). "Search for the Record of Robert Hanham Collyer, M.D." Science. 55 (1412): 72–73. doi:10.1126/science.55.1412.72.a. PMID 17753929.
- Osborn, Henry Fairfield (3 February 1922b). "The Lost Foxhall Jaw; Robert Hanham Collyer". Science. 55 (1414): 128. Bibcode:1922Sci....55..128F. doi:10.1126/science.55.1414.128. PMID 17817603.
- Richards, Irving T. (June 1934). "Mary Gove Nichols and John Neal". The New England Quarterly. 7 (2): 335–55. doi:10.2307/359906. JSTOR 359906.
- Silverman, Kenneth (1992). Edgar A. Poe: Mournful and Never-ending Remembrance. HarperPerennial. ISBN 978-0-06-092331-0.
- Stoehr, Taylor (1987). "Robert H. Collyer's Technology of the Soul". In Wrobel, Arthur (ed.). Pseudo-science and Society in Nineteenth-century America. Lexington, KY: University Press of Kentucky. pp. 21–45. ISBN 978-0-8131-1632-7. Archived from the original on 2020-05-06.
- Sunderland, La Roy (June 1842). "Phreno-Magnetic Discoveries" (PDF). The Magnet. 1 (1): 7–10.
- Sunderland, La Roy (1847). Pathetism: Man Considered in Respect to his Form, Life, Sensation, Soul, Mind, Spirit, etc (PDF). Boston: White & Potter.
- Sunderland, K. (1853). Book of Psychology: Pathetism, Historical, Philosophical, Practical; Giving the Rationale of Every Possible Form of Nervous Or Mental Phenomena, etc (PDF). New York, NY: Stearns & Company.
- Sydney, Algernon (1848-01-27). "Philadelphia Correspondence". The (Washington) National Era. p. 15.
- Sykes, William Stanley (1960). "The Jump-Up-Behinder". In Ellis, Richard H. (ed.). Essays on the First Hundred Years of Anaesthesia. Edinburgh: Livingstone. pp. 45–60. ISBN 978-0-443-02867-0.
- Taves, Ann (1999). Fits, Trances, & Visions: Experiencing Religion and Explaining Experience from Wesley to James. Princeton, N.J.: Princeton University Press. ISBN 978-0-691-02876-7.
- Whitnall, Harold O. (1944-09-09). "There's a £250,000 Jaw Bone Missing from Britain". The World's News (Sydney). p. 6.
- Yeates, Lindsay B. (January 2013). James Braid: Surgeon, Gentleman Scientist, and Hypnotist (PhD thesis). School of History and Philosophy of Science, Faculty of Arts & Social Sciences, University of New South Wales.
- Yeates, Lindsay B. (Spring 2018). "James Braid (IV): Braid's Further Boundary-Work, and the Publication of Neurypnology" (PDF). Australian Journal of Clinical Hypnotherapy & Hypnosis. 40 (2): 58–111.
- Younger, D. (1887). The Magnetic and Botanic Family Physician, and Domestic Practice of Natural Medicine: With Illustrations Showing Various Phases of Mesmeric Treatment, including Full and Concise Instruction in Mesmerism, Curative Magnetism, Massage, and Medical Botany. London: E.W. Allen.
