= A Germ-Destroyer =

1887 short story by Rudyard Kipling

"A Germ-Destroyer" is a short story by Rudyard Kipling. It was first published in the Civil and Military Gazette on May 17, 1887, in the first Indian edition of Plain Tales from the Hills in 1888, and in subsequent editions of that collection. The story is one of Kipling's essays into farcical humour – with his frequent sardonic glances at the oddities of the way that the world works: here, the administrative world of the British Raj. He tells of the new Viceroy who has arrived with a Private Secretary called Wonder, who is trying to run the Indian Empire. ("All Simla agreed that there was 'too much Wonder and too little Viceroy in that rule.'")

The farce of the story begins with the coincidence of two men who want to speak to the Viceroy. There is a monomaniac inventor called Mellish, who has little hope of an audience; and Mellishe, of Madras, who is rich, grandiloquent and important, and has the 'perquisite' of 'conferring with the Viceroy'. They are both staying at the same hotel, and Wonder's invitation to a private lunch with the Viceroy is delivered to the inventor, rather than, as intended, the rich man. The Viceroy is charmed by his guest, who doesn't 'talk shop' till they smoke after lunch. Then Mellish, the Inventor, discourses on cholera, his theory, the 'conspiracy' against him of the medical establishment and so on, until he tips a sample of his patent Fumigatory powder into an ash-tray and lights it. The result is a "most pungent and sickening stench" which fills the entire Viceregal residence. (This is an example of Kipling's schoolboy sense of humour: he was after all only 21 when he wrote this story.) Mellish boasts that "'not a germ could live.'" The residence panics, until "an Aide-de-Camp, who desired the V.C. [more schoolboy humour] rushed through the rolling clouds and hauled Mellish into the hall." The Viceroy, "prostrate with laughter", repeats "'Not a germ, as you say, could rightly exist! I can swear it. A magnificent success!'"

Wonder arrives and is shocked by the scene. But it becomes a splendid anecdote for the Viceroy, and he uses it to get rid of Wonder (his own plague, or 'germ') by saying, in the latter's hearing, "'And I really thought ... that my dear good Wonder had hired an assassin to clear his way to the throne!'". Whereupon Wonder resigns (on health grounds) – the ending, too, may perhaps be thought of as rather adolescent.

All quotations in this article have been taken from the Uniform Edition of Plain Tales from the Hills published by Macmillan & Co., Limited in London in 1899. The text is that of the third edition (1890), and the author of the article has used his own copy of the 1923 reprint.
