= The Broken-Link Handicap =

The Rudyard Kipling story "The Broken-Link Handicap" was first published in the first Indian edition of Plain Tales from the Hills in 1888, and in subsequent editions of that collection.

Kipling states that horse-racing among the British community in India is a thoroughly immoral pastime in which almost everyone involved loses money. By chance, an otherwise undistinguished horse named "Shackles" proves to be unbeatable over two miles, "so long as his jockey sat still". His owner takes Shackles to the Autumn Races at the station of Chedputter "in the North", and insults almost everyone. They go to the Honorary Secretary and arrange a race to be called "The Broken-Link Handicap" because its purpose is to "break Shackles".

Although Shackles's owner is confident in his horse and his Australian jockey, Brunt, the owner of a less-fancied horse, "The Lady Regula Baddun" (named as a delicate tribute to Mrs. Reiver, see The Rescue of Pluffles), knows that Brunt is traumatised by a horrific fall at the Maribyrnong Plate in Melbourne where four jockeys were killed and often tells of how the jockey Whalley said "God ha' mercy, I'm done for" seconds before he was crushed. He also knows that at one end of the Chedputter course, two old brick mounds enclosing a funnel shaped hollow focus speech in an ordinary tone of voice into a whining echo.

Midway through the race, with Shackles about to pull clear of the pack, Brunt hears a ghostly voice saying "God ha' mercy, I'm done for." He screams and digs his spurs into Shackles, who throws him off. Regula Baddun wins in a close finish. Her owner has won about fifteen thousand rupees. Almost everyone else concerned has been broken, none more so than Brunt who is too unnerved ever to race again.

Kipling comments at the end that what he has related is the truth, but nobody will believe it, even though they will believe the most absurd speculation about Russia's designs on India, or the "recommendations of the Currency Commission".

All quotations in this article have been taken from the Uniform Edition of Plain Tales from the Hills published by Macmillan & Co., Limited in London in 1899. The text is that of the third edition (1890), and the author of the article has used his own copy of the 1923 reprint. Further comment, including page-by-page notes, can be found on the Kipling Society's website.
