= Hauksbee =

Hauksbee may refer to:

- Francis Hauksbee (scientist), 1666–1713.
- Mrs. Hauksbee, a fictional character in many stories by Rudyard Kipling
