= The Other Man (short story) =

1886 short story by Rudyard Kipling

"The Other Man" is a short story by the British writer Rudyard Kipling, first published in the Civil and Military Gazette on 13 November 1886, in the first Indian edition of Plain Tales from the Hills in 1888, and in subsequent editions of that collection.

The story, which is set in Simla, the Hill Station where the British used to spend their leaves during the hot weather, tells of Miss Gaurey, whom "her parents made ... marry Colonel Schreiderling ... not much more than 35 years her senior", who is a good match, if not particularly well off, and has lung-complaints which she nurses "seventeen days in each month". She had been secretly engaged to "the Other Man" ("I have forgotten his name"), who gets himself transferred away to an unhealthy Station. He also has bad health: intermittent fever, and a bad heart valve. Mrs Schreiderling, as she now is, never weeps, but begins to contract every infection on the Station. She becomes ugly - Schreiderling says so, and returns to bachelor habits.

One August, he leaves her at Simla to return to his regiment. The narrator hears that the Other Man is coming to Simla, being very sick. Mrs Schreiderling is waiting for him at dusk on the Mall as his Tonga (carriage) draws up as the narrator is passing - and then she screams. The long journey has killed the Other Man. The narrator sorts out the details, ensuring the confidentiality of the Tonga driver, and takes Mrs Schreiderling home.

"She did not die - men of Schreiderling's stamp marry women who don't die easily. They live and grow ugly." Two years later, she goes Home; and dies.

All quotations in this article have been taken from the Uniform Edition of Plain Tales from the Hills published by Macmillan & Co., Limited in London in 1899. The text is that of the third edition (1890), and the author of the article has used his own copy of the 1923 reprint.
