= Horatio Boileau Goad =

Horatio Boileau Goad (18 September 1839 – 12 February 1896) was a policeman who rose to be the secretary of the Municipal Corporation of Simla, British India. Goad committed suicide in 1896.

== Career description ==
He had an extraordinary knowledge of local languages and customs and was a master of disguise. He was the eldest son of Major Samuel Boileau Goad who built and owned 33 homes in Simla.

== Literary depiction by Kipling ==
Rudyard Kipling based the character Strickland in Plain Tales from the Hills on Goad.

== Suicide ==
Goad committed suicide in 1896.
