= The Conversion of Aurelian McGoggin =

1887 short story by Rudyard Kipling

"The Conversion of Aurelian McGoggin" is a short story by Rudyard Kipling. It was first published in the Civil and Military Gazette on April 28, 1887, and first in book form in the first Indian edition of Plain Tales from the Hills in 1888, and in subsequent editions of that collection.

Aurelian McGoggin is a young man fresh out to India. He is much influenced by the ideas of Auguste Comte and Herbert Spencer. These names, along with the attitudes expressed by the narrator of the story, are sufficient to stamp McGoggin as that most undesirable type in the days of the Raj, an 'intellectual': in the story, he is mocked for his 'theories' and his "Creed". This appears mostly to consist in denying the existence of souls, and of God. (In one of Kipling's characteristically double-edged ways of looking ironically at the world he writes, after discoursing on the chain of command in British India: "If the Empress be not responsible to her Maker - if there is no Maker for her to be responsible to - the entire system of Our administration must be wrong; which is manifestly impossible.")

McGoggin becomes intolerable to the men who have been in India longer than he has. "christened him the 'Blastoderm', and throw cushions at him in the Club: His superior says that "for a clever boy, Aurelian was a very big idiot." He works well, and hard - too hard, for he suffers an attack of aphasia - a mental breakdown, which deprives him speech. The Doctor prescribes him three months rest. The experience cows McGoggin: he is frightened of what he has learnt about himself, and what he does not understand about his own mind and memory. The upshot is that "the Club had rest when he returned".

This story is one where Kipling tries to make sense of the whole Indian experience, or at least portray it to those living in the United Kingdom ("Home"), and betrays an anti-intellectual pose as the bluff common-sensical man. At the same time, he shows real sympathy for the man who "was afraid - horribly afraid".

All quotations in this article have been taken from the Uniform Edition of Plain Tales from the Hills published by Macmillan & Co., Limited in London in 1899. The text is that of the third edition (1890), and the author of the article has used his own copy of the 1923 reprint. The Kipling Society's website has further comment, including page-by-page notes.
