= The Facts in the Case of M. Valdemar =

Short story by Edgar Allan Poe

- Short story by Edgar Allan Poe
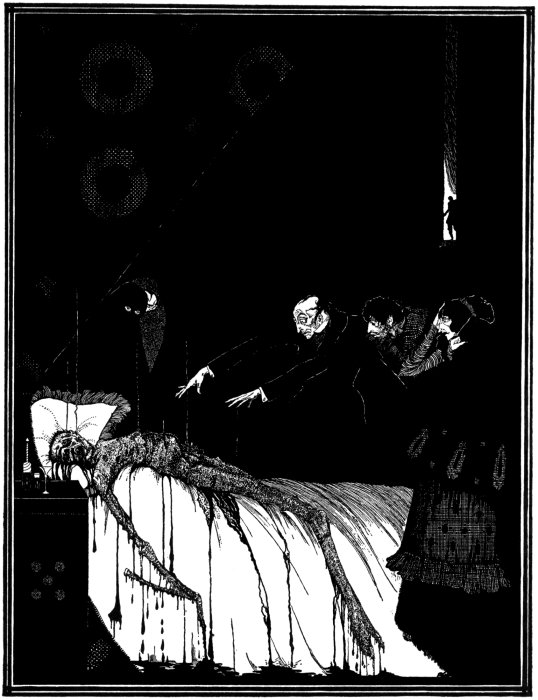
- Illustration for "The Facts in the Case of M. Valdemar" by Harry Clarke, 1919.
- Country: United States
- Language: English
- Genres: Suspense, hoax, Science fiction

Publication
- Published in: The American Review and Broadway Journal (simultaneously)
- Publication type: Periodical
- Media type: Print (Magazine)
- Publication date: December 1845

"The Facts in the Case of M. Valdemar" is a short story by the American author Edgar Allan Poe about a mesmerist who puts a man in a suspended hypnotic state at the moment of death. An example of a tale of suspense and horror, it is also to a certain degree a hoax, as it was published without claiming to be fictional, and many at the time of publication (1845) took it to be a factual account. Poe admitted it to be a work of pure fiction in letters to his correspondents.

== Plot ==
The narrator presents the facts of the extraordinary case of his friend Ernest Valdemar, which have incited public discussion. He is interested in mesmerism, a pseudoscience involving bringing a patient into a hypnagogic state by the influence of animal magnetism, a process that later developed into hypnotism. He points out that as far as he knows, no one has ever been mesmerized at the point of death, and he is curious to see what effects mesmerism would have on a dying person. He considers experimenting on Valdemar, an author whom he had previously mesmerized and who has recently been diagnosed with phthisis (tuberculosis).

Valdemar consents to the experiment and informs the narrator by letter that his doctors expect him to die by midnight of the following evening. Valdemar's two physicians inform the narrator of their patient's poor condition. After confirming again that Valdemar is willing to be part of the experiment, the narrator comes back the next night with two nurses and a medical student as witnesses. Again, Valdemar insists he is willing to take part and asks the narrator to hurry for fear he has "deferred it for too long". Valdemar is quickly mesmerized just as both physicians return and serve as additional witnesses.

In a trance, he reports first that he is dying and then that he is dead. The narrator leaves him in a mesmeric state for seven months and checks on him daily with the help of physicians and friends. Meanwhile, Valdemar is without pulse, heartbeat, or perceptible breathing, and his skin is cold and pale.

Finally, the narrator makes attempts to awaken Valdemar by asking questions that are answered with difficulty, as Valdemar's voice emanates from his throat and lolling tongue, but his lips and jaws are frozen in death. In between trance and wakefulness, Valdemar begs the narrator to put him back to sleep quickly or to waken him. As Valdemar shouts "Dead! Dead!" repeatedly, the narrator starts to bring him out of his trance, only for his entire body to immediately decay into a "nearly liquid mass of loathsome—of detestable putrescence."

== Publication history ==
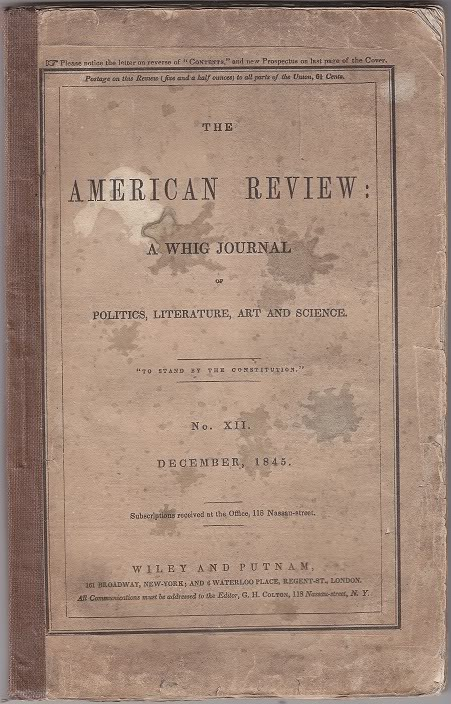
The story appeared as "The Facts of M. Valdemar's Case" in The American Review, December, 1845, Wiley and Putnam, New York.

While editor of The Broadway Journal, Poe printed a letter from a New York physician named Dr. A. Sidney Doane that recounted a surgical operation performed while a patient was "in a magnetic sleep"; the letter served as inspiration for Poe's tale. "The Facts in the Case of M. Valdemar" was published simultaneously in the December 20, 1845, issue of the Broadway Journal and the December 1845 issue of American Review: A Whig Journal—the latter journal used the title "The Facts of M. Valdemar's Case". It was also republished in England, first as a pamphlet edition as "Mesmerism in Articulo Mortis" and later as "The Last Days of M. Valdemar".

== Reception and critical response ==
Many readers thought that the story was a scientific report. Robert Hanham Collyer, an English magnetic healer visiting Boston, wrote to Poe saying that he himself had performed a similar act to revive a man who had been pronounced dead (in truth, the man was actually a drunken sailor who was revived by a hot bath). Collyer reported of the story's success in Boston: "Your account of M. Valdemar's case has been universally copied in this city, and has created a very great sensation." Another Englishman, Thomas South, used the story as a case study in his book Early Magnetism in its Higher Relations to Humanity, published in 1846. A medical student, George C. Eveleth, wrote to Poe: "I have strenuously held that it was true. But I tell you that I strongly suspect it for a hoax." A Scottish reader named Archibald Ramsay wrote to Poe "as a believer in Mesmerism" asking about the story: "It details ... most extraordinary circumstances", he wrote, concerned that it had been labeled a hoax. "For the sake of ... Science and of truth", he requested an answer from Poe himself. Poe's response was that "Hoax is precisely the word suited. ... Some few persons believe it—but I do not—and don't you." Poe received many similar letters, and replied to one such letter from a friend: "P.S. The 'Valdemar Case' was a hoax, of course." In the Daily Tribune, its editor, Horace Greeley, noted "that several good matter-of-fact citizens" were tricked by the story, but "whoever thought it a veracious recital must have the bump of Faith large, very large indeed."

Elizabeth Barrett Browning wrote to Poe about the story to commend him on his talent for "making horrible improbabilities seem near and familiar". The Virginia poet Philip Pendleton Cooke also wrote to Poe, calling the story "the most damnable, vraisemblable, horrible, hair-lifting, shocking, ingenious chapter of fiction that any brain ever conceived or hand traced. That gelatinous, viscous sound of man's voice! there never was such an idea before." George Edward Woodberry wrote that the story, "for mere physical disgust and foul horror, has no rival in literature." James M. Hutchisson refers to the story as "probably Poe's most gruesome tale".

Rudyard Kipling, an admirer of Poe, references "The Facts in the Case of M. Valdemar" in his story "In the House of Suddhoo", which suggests the disastrous results of the sorcery used by a man trying to save his sick son's life. One spell requires the head of a dead baby, which seems to speak. The narrator says, "Read Poe's account of the voice that came from the mesmerised dying man, and you will realise less than one half of the horror of that head's voice."

== Analysis ==
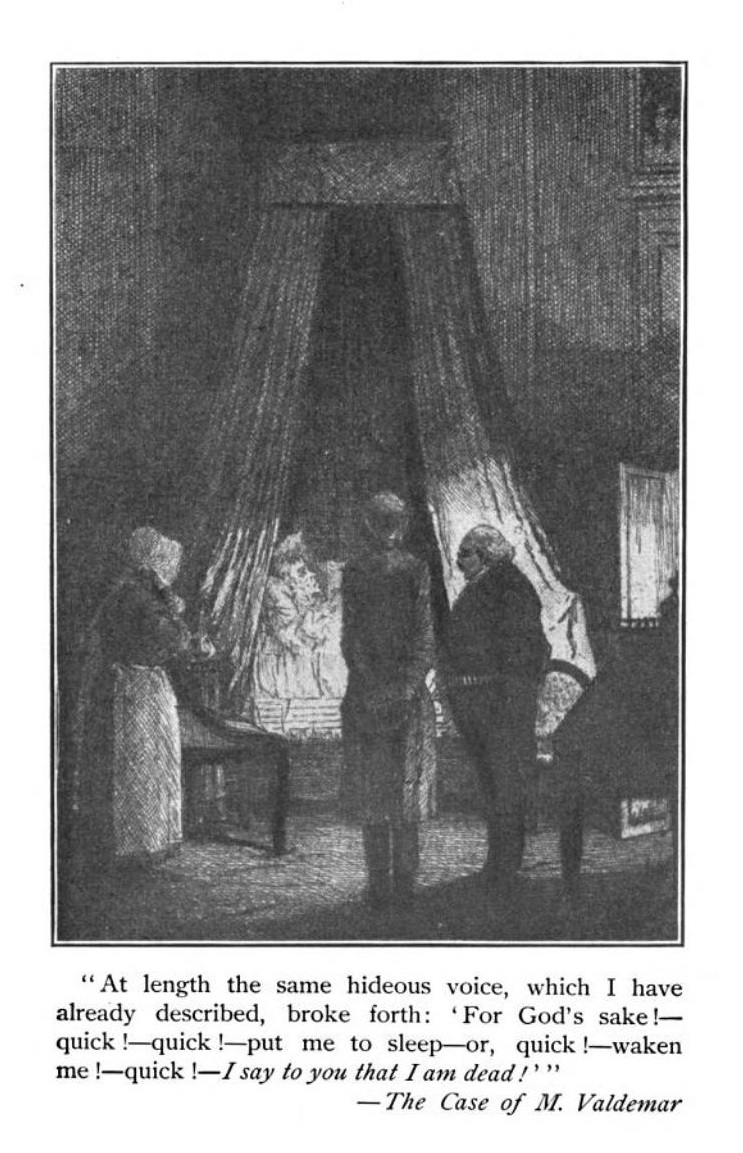
"I say to you that I am dead!" (1902)

Poe uses particularly detailed descriptions and relatively high levels of gore in "The Facts in the Case of M. Valdemar", displaying his own studies of medical texts. Valdemar's eyes at one point leak a "profuse outflowing of a yellowish ichor", for example, though Poe's imagery in the story is best summed up in its final lines: "... his whole frame at once—within the space of a single minute, or even less, shrunk—crumbled—absolutely rotted away beneath my hands. Upon the bed, before that whole company, there lay a nearly liquid mass of loathsome—of detestable putrescence." The disgusting imagery almost certainly inspired later fiction, including that of H. P. Lovecraft. These final lines incorporate shock, disgust, and uneasiness into one moment. The ending may also suggest that attempts to appropriate power over death have hideous results and are bound to be unsuccessful.

Valdemar's cultural or ethnic origins are unclear. He has "no relatives in America", according to the text, and scholar María DeGuzmán suggested his name is "Galician-Portuguese" term which can be literally translated as "valley of the sea". Biographer Jeffrey Meyers has suggested that the name thus suggests both solid and liquid states, as emphasized in the imagery deployed as Valdemar's body transitions from its normal solid state to liquid in the final lines. Gustavus Stadler has noted that other critics have also emphasized the "valley of the sea" meaning (from French val de mer) as a possible pun by Poe that corresponds to his use of the sea a metaphor in his stories. Stadler has also proposed that Valdemar represents a "shifty nationality" associated with 19th century mistrust and prejudice of Jews as people lacking their own culture and who "traffic in other's originality". His manner of death can also be read as suggestive of a fitting punishment for degeneracy.

Poe typically uses teeth to symbolize mortality, as with "sepulchral and disgusting" horse's teeth in "Metzengerstein", the obsession with teeth in "Berenice", and the sound of grating teeth in "Hop-Frog".

Valdemar's death by tuberculosis, and the attempts to postpone his death, may have been influenced by the experiences of Poe's wife, Virginia. At the time the story was published, she had been suffering from tuberculosis for four years. Poe's extreme detail in "The Facts in the Case of M. Valdemar" may have been based on Virginia's suffering. Additionally, Poe may have been inspired by Andrew Jackson Davis, whose lectures on mesmerism he had attended. Valdemar's death, however, is not portrayed sentimentally as Poe's typical theme of "the death of a beautiful woman" portrayed in other works such as "Ligeia" and "Morella". In contrast, the death of this male character is brutal and sensational.

== Adaptations ==
The short story "Omega" (1932) by Amelia Reynolds Long is a science fiction adaptation of Poe's story. The short movie Il caso Valdemar was produced in Italy in 1936 by directors Gianni Hoepli and Ubaldo Magnaghi. The radio drama show The Weird Circle aired an adaptation "The Case of Monsieur Valdemar" in 1943. "The Facts in the Case of M. Valdemar" was adapted into film in Argentina in 1960 as a segment of Masterpieces of Horror, first shown in the United States in 1965. It was also the last one of the three Poe-inspired segments in the 1962 Roger Corman film Tales of Terror.

Narciso Ibáñez Serrador included an adaption into his Historias para no dormir (Tales not to sleep) in 1966, which he remade sixteen years later with the same actors, this time in color. It was later adapted by George A. Romero in Two Evil Eyes (1990). The radio drama series Radio Tales produced an adaptation of the story entitled "Edgar Allan Poe's Valdemar" (2000) for National Public Radio. The story was also loosely adapted into the black comedy The Mesmerist (2002).

In the BBC docudrama Dickens, author Charles Dickens meets a fictionalized Poe on his tour of the United States. Poe takes him to witness a man held at the door of death by hypnotism and, when the man begs to be released so he can die, he turns into a pile of maggots. The scene is likely inspired by this story.

A theatrical adaptation was written by Lance Tait in 2005 and directed by Erica Raymos at the DR2 Theatre in New York. The story is also adapted in the animated anthology film of Poe tales, Extraordinary Tales (Raul Garcia, 2013), narrated by Christopher Lee, Bela Lugosi and Julian Sands.
