= Consequences (Kipling story) =

1886 short story by Rudyard Kipling

"Consequences" is the title of a short story by Rudyard Kipling, first published in the Civil and Military Gazette on December 9, 1886; and first in book form in the first Indian edition of Plain Tales from the Hills (1888), and in subsequent editions of that collection.

The story is an illustration of the power of Mrs Hauksbee, who features in seven of Kiping's Simla stories.

== Plot summary ==
Tarrion, a "clever and amusing" young officer in an unfashionable regiment, longs for a permanent appointment in Simla. There he has the good fortune to do Mrs Hauksbee a favour (by forging a date on her invitation, so that she can attend the more prestigious Ball, rather than the smaller "dance" to which she has been sent an invitation by the Governor's A.-D.-C. with whom she has quarrelled). So she owes Tarrion a favour, and asks what she can do. He admits that "I haven't a square inch of interest here in Simla" - but says that he wants a permanent post in that most desirable Hill Station. She agrees to help him.

Now by chance (an ill-written address, and a stupid orderly) she comes into possession of some official papers. These she reads with Tarrion, and he uses them to persuade "the biggest and strongest man that the Government owned" to give him a permanent post. It is not particularly well-paid, but it is finally granted because the Viceroy has an obsession with 'Diplomatic secrecy', and believes that "a boy so well supplied with information would be worth" promoting.

At the end, Tarrion thinks "'If Mrs Hauksbee were twenty years younger, and I her husband, I should be Viceroy of India in fifteen years.'" Mrs Hauksbee thinks "'What fools men are!'"

== Note on the text ==
All quotations in this article have been taken from the Uniform Edition of Plain Tales from the Hills published by Macmillan & Co., Limited in London in 1899. The text is that of the third edition (1890), and the author of the article has used his own copy of the 1923 reprint. Further comment, including these page-by-page notes are on the Kipling Society's website.
