= Throwaway =

Throwaway may refer to:

- Disposable, single use
- "Throwaway", an episode of The Shield
- "Throwaway", a song by Mick Jagger from the album Primitive Cool
- Throwaway, the winner of the Ascot Gold Cup in 1904

== See also ==
- Throwaway line, a joke delivered "in passing" without being the punch line to a comedy routine
- Throw-away society, a human society strongly influenced by consumerism
- Disposable email address, also known as a throwaway email address
- "Thrown Away", a short story by Rudyard Kipling
