= The Arrest of Lieutenant Golightly =

1886 short story by Rudyard Kipling

"The Arrest of Lieutenant Golightly" is a short story by Rudyard Kipling. It was first published in the Civil and Military Gazette on 23 November 1886 in book form, in the first Indian edition of Plain Tales from the Hills in 1888, and in subsequent editions of that collection. The story, published when Kipling was not quite 21 years old, is a well-crafted piece of writing about an essentially schoolboy version of schadenfreude - sheer pleasure, in this case, at seeing someone 'get his comeuppance' - with an element of slapstick.

Lieutenant Golightly is a young officer in the British Army in India who prides himself on "looking like 'an Officer and a Gentleman'". According to John McGivering, in the Notes to this story on the Kipling Society's website, Golightly is certainly an officer, but not at all certainly a gentleman. It is clear that he takes too much care over his appearance, and dresses rather too flashily, wearing, as he is, a "delicate olive-green suit" with a blue tie and a sola topee. As he hastens back from leave (having left all his money apart from loose change behind him), he is beset by misfortune: monsoon rains make him muddy and sweaty; his helmet dissolves in the rain; the dyes of its lining (purple) and his suit (green) run. He falls from his horse, which becomes so lame that he has to walk, whereon he throws away his tie, which has also run, and his (detachable) collar. He arrives at a railway station, buys a drink - and finds that he only has 6 annas left. On talking to the Station Master, he is taken for a deserter, one Private Binkle, and after some temporising is arrested and carried bodily off by four native policeman. They hand him over to a detachment of the British Army, who admire his fluency in bad language, but don't believe his insistence that he is an officer. Golightly is finally saved by a Major in his own Regiment, who recognises him and has him released - then, of course, relating the story to the army. Kipling says that he may now publish the story as Golightly has "gone Home".

All quotations in this article have been taken from the Uniform Edition of Plain Tales from the Hills published by Macmillan & Co., Limited in London in 1899. The text is that of the third edition (1890), and the author of the article has used his own copy of the 1923 reprint. Further comment, including page-by-page notes, can be found on the Kipling Society's website, at http://www.kipling.org.uk/rg_golightly1.htm
