= Yoked with an Unbeliever =

1886 short story by Rudyard Kipling

"Yoked with an Unbeliever" is a short story by Rudyard Kipling. It was first published in the Civil and Military Gazette on December 7, 1886, and in book form in the first Indian edition of Plain Tales from the Hills in 1888. It also appears in subsequent editions of that collection.

The story is one of Kipling's reflections on relations between the English settlers, representing the British Raj, and the native population. As so often, there is no clear-cut schematic version of the rights and wrongs - as Kipling himself says in the last sentence of the story, "Which is manifestly unfair."

The 'unfairness' is that a worthless man is loved by two women, for no reason apparent to outside observers. Phil Garron is an Englishman who has been sent out "to 'tea'". (This was a form of disgrace for the ruling class in Britain: those who failed, like Garron, in the home country were sometimes sent out 'to the Colonies' to try to redeem themselves.) Garron, who "was really going to reform all his slack, shiftless ways" leaves Agnes Laiter heartbroken behind him. He is a man of weak character, but he settles into decent (if not exceptional, as he believes) competence - and as he works, forgets Agnes, other than as a daydream. Her family bring pressure on her, successfully, to marry another (a 'better prospect' than Garron): she writes to Garron to tell him, saying "she would never know a happy moment all the rest of her life. Which was a true prophecy." (Kipling here shows his deft touch with at least seemingly mature psychological insight, and deft narrative detail.) Garron replies with a carefully drafted letter, which ordinary men might have called "the thoroughly mean and selfish work of a thoroughly mean and selfish man": but it makes Agnes cry; and Garron (in Kipling's ironic phrase) "felt every word he had written for at least two days and a half." He takes up shortly after with a Hill-woman called Dunmaya, the daughter of a senior soldier among the troops of the Native Army and marries her.

Agnes, now widowed, finds herself in Bombay and seeks Garron out. She finds him "very little altered, and Dunmaya was very nice to her." The shame, and unfairness, is first, that Phil, who really is not worth thinking of twice, was and is loved by Dunmaya, and more than loved by Agnes", and second, that "Dunmaya [the 'mere' native] is making a decent man of him [the 'white man']; and he will ultimately be saved from perdition by her training."

So it is clear that Kipling is neither a simple misogynist, nor a simple race supremacist.

All quotations in this article have been taken from the Uniform Edition of Plain Tales from the Hills published by Macmillan & Co., Limited in London in 1899. The text is that of the third edition (1890), and the author of the article has used his own copy of the 1923 reprint. Further comment, including page-by-page notes, can be found on the Kipling Society's website, at.
