= The Rescue of Pluffles =

1886 short story by Rudyard Kipling

"The Rescue of Pluffles" is a short story by Rudyard Kipling. Its first appearance in book form was in Kipling's first collection of short stories, Plain Tales from the Hills (1888); it was first published in the Civil and Military Gazette on November 20, 1886. It centres on Mrs Hauksbee, and begins

Mrs. Hauksbee was sometimes nice to her own sex. Here is a story to prove this; and you can believe just as much as ever you please.

(It is necessary to say how Mrs. Hauksbee can be 'nice', after the story "Three and - an Extra" which introduced her to Kipling's readers as a woman predatory on another's husband.)

In The Rescue of Pluffles, Pluffles is a subaltern (2nd Lieutenant) in a regiment known (for a concealing nickname) 'The Unmentionables'. He is callow, and 'trusts his own judgement': and, at 24, becomes "bound hand and foot to Mrs. Reiver's 'rickshaw wheels" - that is a hyperbolic way of saying that she dominates him so that he is at her whim. Mrs. Hauksbee and Mrs. Reiver hate each other "fervently." Mrs. Hauksbee learns that Pluffles has left a fiancée at home in England. She fights Mrs. Reiver in "the Seven Weeks' War", and finally wins by talking to him "after the manner of a mother". Pluffles and his fiancée are married. He leaves the army and returns to lead a happy life farming in England. "He would have come to extreme grief in India".

The story's last paragraph:

For these reasons, if anyone says anything more than usually nasty about Mrs. Hauksbee, tell him the story of the Rescue of Pluffles.

All quotations in this article have been taken from the Uniform Edition of Plain Tales from the Hills published by Macmillan & Co., Limited in London in 1899. The text is that of the third edition (1890), and the author of the article has used his own copy of the 1923 reprint. Further comment, including page-by-page notes, can be found on the Kipling Society's website, at .
