= His Wedded Wife =

1887 short story by Rudyard Kipling

"His Wedded Wife" by Rudyard Kipling ...was published in the Civil and Military Gazette on February 25, 1887, and in book form in the first Indian edition of Plain Tales from the Hills in 1888, and in subsequent editions of that collection. It is one of the short stories that J. M. S. Tompkins classifies as a tale of 'revenge', but it has elements of those classified as 'farce'.

== Plot summary ==
Henry Augustus Ramsay Faizanne, "for the sake of brevity" called 'The Worm', is a subaltern newly arrived in India.to join the Second Shikarris (a fictional regiment in India). His brother junior officers "soften" him (i.e. bully him, to make him conform) until all become bored, except the Senior Subaltern. One day when the latter has played a practical joker on him, the Worm turns and bets a month's pay that when the Senior Subaltern is promoted to captain, he (the Worm) will in turn play a joke on the Senior that he will never forget. The bet is accepted.

After two months, the Senior Subaltern "gets his Company" (promotion), and at the same time becomes engaged to be married. One night in the hot weather, while the Senior Subaltern was singing the praises of his fiancée to the members of the Officers' Mess and their guests (wives), a voice is heard: "Where's my husband?" (Kipling's sense of farce shows: "four men jumped up as if they had been shot. Three of them were married men ... The fourth said that he had acted on the impulse of the moment.") The voice cries "O Lionel!", and all recognize the Senior Subaltern. The plot thickens, in that the woman - who obviously knows him well - seems not quite a lady. The Colonel is perturbed - the narrator says that watching the Senior Subaltern's face "was rather like seeing a man hanged, but much more interesting." When she is challenged to produce her marriage certificate, she fetches a paper from her bosom, challenging "'my husband - my lawfully wedded husband - [to] read it aloud - if he dare!'". When he does, it says: "This is to certify that I, the Worm, have paid in full my debts to the Senior Subaltern...".

All laugh hard at this - which "leaned as near to a nasty tragedy as anything this side of a joke can." The Worm has established himself as a talented actor: he is elected president of the regiment's Dramatic Club, and spends his winnings on scenery and costume. He is now known as "Mrs Senior Subaltern" (for reasons of verisimilitude, Kipling is preserving the 'real names' of the characters in the Regiment), which is confusing when Lionel marries his real fiancée.

All quotations in this article have been taken from the Uniform Edition of Plain Tales from the Hills published by Macmillan & Co., Limited in London in 1899. The text is that of the third edition (1890)
