= In the House of Suddhoo =

1886 short story by Rudyard Kipling

"In the House of Suddhoo" is a short story by Rudyard Kipling. The story was published in the Civil and Military Gazette on April 30, 1886 under the title "Section 420, I.P.C." (Indian Penal Code). (Section 420 of the Indian Penal Code of 1860 lays down that anyone who cheats and dishonestly induces a person to hand over any valuable property shall be punished with imprisonment and a fine.) Its first appearance in book form was in the first Indian edition of Plain Tales from the Hills in 1888. It was the third of the stories that appear in that collection to be written

"In the House of Suddhoo" is a story about deception. There are several layers of uncertainty in it. Suddhoo is a "very, very old" man who lets rooms in his house. The inhabitants are: on the ground floor, Bhagwan Dass, the grocer, and a man who claims to be a seal-cutter, together with their households; on the upper floor, Janoo (and formerly Azizun, who has now married and left), "Ladies of the City, and theirs was an ancient and more or less honourable profession" (that is, prostitutes). Here is one layer of questionable honesty - although Kipling is at pains to show Janoo as honest and intelligent. The narrator is in favour with Suddhoo, because he, a Sahib or Briton has got a job for one of Suddhoo's cousins. "Suddhoo says that God will make me a Lieutenant-Governor one of these days. [Another layer of dishonesty - or humour?] I daresay his prophecy will come true. [Again]"

Suddhoo is very fond of his son, who lives at Peshawar, some 400 miles away. The young man contracts pleurisy. The seal-cutter, who understands the telegraph as Suddhoo cannot, has a friend in Peshawar who sends him the details before letters arrive. Suddhoo is worried at his son's health and invites the narrator to discuss it - specifically the prohibition on jadoo, or magic, by the Raj. The narrator reassures him that white magic is permitted, and that the officials of the Raj practise it themselves - Kipling adds, with more humour, "(If the Financial Statement [roughly, the Budget of the government of India] isn't magic, I don't know what is)". Suddhoo admits that he has paid much money for the 'clean sorcery' of the seal-cutter, who gets accurate reports "more quickly than the lightning can fly".

So they approach Suddhoo's house, hearing noises from the seal-cutter's window. They climb the darkened stairs, to Janoo's room, where there is more space. Then the magician enters, stripped to the waist, and puts on a most impressive performance, face white and eyes rolled back. The narrator recognises the fire-eating and the ventriloquism, and realises that, however impressive - and frightening - the performance is, it is a fraud, as Janoo says in her own language hearing him twice claim a very precise fee. (It is, of course, the central fraud in the tale.) She is upset that Suddhoo is spending all his money, some of which she had counted on acquiring (by "wheedling", which may be accounted as another form of deception).

Kipling summarises the narrator's problems: he has aided and abetted the seal-cutter in obtaining money under false pretences, so is guilty under British law; he cannot tackle the seal-cutter, as the latter will poison Janoo; and he fears that Janoo will poison the seal-cutter anyway. making him (the narrator) guilty as accessory to the act.

So deception is manifold.

All quotations in this article have been taken from the Uniform Edition of Plain Tales from the Hills published by Macmillan & Co., Limited in London in 1899. The text is that of the third edition (1890), and the author of the article has used his own copy of the 1923 reprint. The Kipling Society's website has further comment, including notes at .
