= Kidnapping (disambiguation) =

Kidnapping is the taking away of a person against the person's will.

Kidnapping may also refer to:

- The Kidnapping, or Black Friday, a 2007 film by Arthur Allan Seidelman
- The Austere Academy: or, Kidnapping!, an unreleased special edition in the book series A Series of Unfortunate Events
- DNA (Danish TV series), a 2017 television series, known as Kidnapping in some markets

== See also ==
- Abduction (disambiguation)
- Kidnap (disambiguation)
- Kidnapped (disambiguation)
- Kidnapper (disambiguation)
- List of kidnappings
