= Plain Tales from the Hills =

1888 collection of short stories by Rudyard Kipling

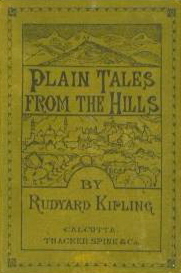
- Cover of the First Edition (1888)
- Author: Rudyard Kipling (English)
- Language: English
- Publisher: Thacker, Spink & Company, Calcutta
- Publication date: 1888
- Publication place: British India
- Media type: Print (Hardback & Paperback)

Plain Tales from the Hills (published 1888) is the first collection of short stories by Rudyard Kipling. Out of its 40 stories, "eight-and-twenty", according to Kipling's Preface, were initially published in the Civil and Military Gazette in Lahore, Punjab, British India between November 1886 and June 1887. "The remaining tales are, more or less, new." (Kipling had worked as a journalist for the CMG—his first job—since 1882, when he was not quite 17.)

The title refers, by way of a pun on "Plain" as the reverse of "Hills", to the deceptively simple narrative style; and to the fact that many of the stories are set in the Hill Station of Simla—the "summer capital of the British Raj" during the hot weather. Not all of the stories are, in fact, about life in "the Hills": Kipling gives sketches of many aspects of life in British India.

The tales include the first appearances, in book form, of Mrs. Hauksbee, the policeman Strickland, and the Soldiers Three (Privates Mulvaney, Ortheris and Learoyd).

In the preface to his short stories collection "Dr. Brodie's Report", Jorge Luis Borges wrote he was inspired by the quality and concision of Plain Tales from the Hills.

== The stories ==
- "Lispeth"
- "Three and – an Extra"
- "Thrown Away"
- "Miss Youghal's Sais"
- "'Yoked with an Unbeliever'"
- "False Dawn"
- "The Rescue of Pluffles"
- "Cupid's Arrows"
- "The Three Musketeers"
- "His Chance in Life"
- "Watches of the Night"
- "The Other Man"
- "Consequences"
- "The Conversion of Aurelian McGoggin"
- "The Taking of Lungtungpen"
- "A Germ-Destroyer"
- "Kidnapped"
- "The Arrest of Lieutenant Golightly"
- "In the House of Suddhoo"
- "His Wedded Wife"
- "The Broken-Link Handicap"
- "Beyond the Pale"
- "In Error"
- "A Bank Fraud"
- "Tods' Amendment"
- "The Daughter of the Regiment"
- "In the Pride of his Youth"
- "Pig"
- "The Rout of the White Hussars"
- "The Bronckhorst Divorce-case"
- "Venus Annodomini"
- "The Bisara of Pooree"
- "A Friend's Friend"
- "The Gate of the Hundred Sorrows"
- "The Madness of Private Ortheris"
- "The Story of Muhammad Din"
- "On the Strength of a Likeness"
- "Wressley of the Foreign Office"
- "By Word of Mouth"
- "To be Filed for Reference"

Some of the characters in these stories reappear in the novel Kim.
