= Miss Youghal's Sais =

1887 short story by Rudyard Kipling

"Miss Youghal's Sais" is a short story in Rudyard Kipling's collection Plain Tales from the Hills (1888). It is the first appearance in book form of the fictional character Strickland. (It was first published in the Civil and Military Gazette on 25 April 1887.)

== Plot ==
Strickland, a policeman who is regarded as disreputable for his habits in going undercover disguised as a native, falls in love with Miss Youghal. Her parents do not approve, not only are "ways and works" untrustworthy, but he works in "the worst paid Department in the Empire." Her parents forbid him from speaking with or writing to their daughter. "'Very well,' said Strickland, for he did not wish to make his lady-love's life a burden." Then he takes three months leave, disappears, and is employed as her Sais, or native groom, called Dulloo. One day, towards the end of the three months, "an old and very distinguished General" takes Miss Youghal riding, and flirts with her. Strickland "stood it as long as he could. Then he caught hold of the General's bridle, and, in most fluent English, invited him to step off and be flung over the cliff." Miss Youghal explains, and the General begins to laugh. He intercedes on the behalf of the young pair to her parents, and they are married.

All quotations in the plot summary above have been taken from the Uniform Edition of Plain Tales from the Hills published by Macmillan & Co., Limited in London in 1899. The text is that of the third edition (1890), and the author of the article has used his own copy of the 1923 reprint. Further comment, including page-by-page notes, can be found on the Kipling Society's website, at .

== Further appearances of Strickland ==
Strickland made six further appearances in the Kipling canon, figuring in two tales of the supernatural in Life's Handicap. "Mark of the Beast" tells of the possession of a naive Englishman by a werewolf-like spirit as punishment for defiling the image of a native god, and its exorcism by Strickland and the narrator. "The Return of Imray" is cast in the classic form of the ghost of a murdered man returning to seek justice. Both stories are set in the time before Strickland's engagement, and refer to his reputed knowledge of Indian customs and psychology. In The Bronkhorst Divorce (in Plain Tails from the Hills), a brutish army officer tries to divorce his wife, using the perjured testimony of Indian servants as evidence of adultery. Although Strickland has sworn not to go undercover officially, following his marriage, he nevertheless hangs around Bronkhorst's compound in various disguises. In court, one sight of "Estrakheen Sahib" is enough to make Bronkhorst's servants retract their statements.

Strickland makes his fourth appearance in Kipling's "Kim", where, as a District Superintendent of the Police, he rescues E23 with Kim's help. He is described by E23 as "no less than the greatest" of those who play in the Great Game.

Strickland and his son, Adam, appear in two more stories: "The Son of His Father," set in Adam's childhood, and "A Deal in Cotton," which depicts Adam's own adventures in the Civil Service in Africa.
