= Kidnapped (short story) =

The Rudyard Kipling story "Kidnapped" was first published in the Civil and Military Gazette on March 21, 1887, in the first Indian edition of Plain Tales from the Hills (1888), and in subsequent editions of that collection.

This story is an interesting example of the attitudes of Kipling and his contemporaries towards race, particularly interracial marriage. Kipling appears to accept the norms of his time but displays sympathy for the would-be couple. Kipling also makes his characteristic amused observations of the oddities of social behaviour. The story heavily features irony and satirises contemporary fears about miscegenation.

== Plot summary ==
Kipling starts by announcing, "We [British] are a high-caste and enlightened race", but suggesting that arranged marriages are preferable to Western notions of love matches. "The Hindu notion - which is the Continental notion, which is the aboriginal notion - is sound", he writes.

It tells of Peythroppe, an exemplary member of the Indian Civil Service. "All his superiors spoke well of him because he knew how to hold his tongue and his pen at the proper times. There are, today, only eleven men in India who possess this secret; and they have all, with one exception, attained great honour and enormous incomes." There is one flaw in Peythroppe's exemplary conduct: he falls in love with Miss Castries, who is "impossible" as all mothers will know.

The impossibility is a matter of race, always a sensitive subject in the British Raj. Miss Castries is of Portuguese origin ("d'Castries it was originally, but the family dropped the d' for administrative reasons") and has a "'Spanish' complexion", a pronounced widow's peak, and an opal-tinted mark on her nails. These are enough to stamp her as having Indian blood in her ancestry - at a time when marrying someone of a different (or 'impure') race was regarded as disgraceful among the British. Kipling reports the facts, without overt comment: he accepts the 'impossibility' of such a gifted young man marrying such a woman. with all the necessary relationships with her relations. Peythroppe is determined to commit professional suicide. Here Mrs Hauksbee enters. "Her brain struck out the plan that saved him." She talks with Three Men, who dine with Peythroppe three weeks later, as he learns he has been gazetted a month's leave. Then camels are heard in the compound, and ... Kipling employs what in the cinema would be called a fade-out. Furniture is broken, and Peythroppe disappears.

"Mrs Hauksbee said that Mr. Peythroppe was shooting in Rajputana with the Three Men; so we are compelled to believe her." The leave is extended, past the wedding day: "Mrs Hauksbee went to the wedding, and was much astonished when Peythroppe did not appear". The young men return from the leave, one with a cut on his nose "caused by the kick of a gun. Twelve-bores kick rather curiously". Miss Castries' father, Honorary Lieutenant Castries, calls and threatens Peythroppe with a lawsuit for breach of promise, but his daughter knows how a lady should behave and keeps her broken heart to herself. "One of these days [Peythroppe] will marry a sweet pink-and-white maiden, on the Government House List." Kipling ends by saying how much trouble would have been avoided by an Official Matrimonial Department, charged with arranging matches.
