= Chuffy =

- Jeeves and Wooster episode
- Episode no.: Season 2 Episode 4
- Directed by: Simon Langton
- Original air date: 5 May 1991

Episode chronology
| ← Previous "Pearls Mean Tears" | Next → "Kidnapped!" |

"Chuffy" is the fourth episode of the second series of the 1990s British comedy television series Jeeves and Wooster. It is also called "Jeeves in the Country". It first aired in the UK on 5 May 1991 on ITV.

In the US, the episode was aired as the second episode of the fourth series of Jeeves and Wooster. It aired on 15 January 1995 on Masterpiece Theatre. The episode "Aunt Dahlia, Cornelia and Madeline" was aired as the fourth episode of the second series instead.

== Background ==
Adapted from Thank You, Jeeves.

== Cast ==
- Jeeves – Stephen Fry
- Bertie Wooster – Hugh Laurie
- "Chuffy", Lord Chuffnell – Matthew Solon
- Pauline Stoker – Sharon Holm
- J. Washburn Stoker – Manning Redwood
- Brinkley – Fred Evans
- Myrtle Pongleton – Fidelis Morgan
- Seabury Pongleton – Edward Holmes
- Sgt. Voules – Dave Atkins
- Dobson – William Waghorn

== Plot ==
Bertie's insistence on playing the trombone drives Jeeves to give notice. Bertie hires a less satisfactory valet, Brinkley. Bertie's friend, Lord Chuffnell or "Chuffy", quickly snaps Jeeves up.

Bertie rents a country cottage from Chuffy in Chuffy's family-owned village of Chufnell Regis in Devon, and practices his trombone. Chuffy is intent on selling Chuffnell Hall to J. Washburn Stoker, so that he can afford to marry Stoker's daughter Pauline. He discovers, to his concern, that Pauline was once engaged to Bertie—and that Washburn wants Bertie to stay away from his daughter.

Jeeves produces a plan to get Pauline and Chuffy together that results in the burning down of Bertie's cottage. Sympathetic to Bertie, however, Jeeves resumes working for him at the end of the episode.

The seaside part of the Chufnell Regis village scenes (beach, jetty, steep hillside cottages) were filmed in Clovelly, Devon. The thatched cottage village scenes were filmed elsewhere. Chuffnell Hall scenes were filmed at Wrotham Park in Hertfordshire.

== See also ==
- List of Jeeves and Wooster characters
