= Thank You, Jeeves =

1934 novel by P. G. Wodehouse

- First edition (UK)
- Author: P. G. Wodehouse
- Language: English
- Series: Jeeves
- Genre: Comic novel
- Publisher: Herbert Jenkins (UK); Little, Brown & Co (US)
- Publication date: 16 March 1934 (UK); 23 April 1934 (US)
- Publication place: United Kingdom
- Media type: Print
- Preceded by: Very Good, Jeeves
- Followed by: Right Ho, Jeeves

Thank You, Jeeves is a Jeeves comic novel by P. G. Wodehouse, first published in the United Kingdom on 16 March 1934 by Herbert Jenkins, London, and in the United States on 23 April 1934 by Little, Brown and Company, New York.

The story had previously been serialised, in the Strand Magazine in the UK from August 1933 to February 1934, and in the US in Cosmopolitan Magazine from January to June 1934.

Thank You, Jeeves is the first full-length novel in the series of stories following narrator Bertie Wooster and his valet Jeeves, though Jeeves leaves Bertie's employment for most of this story. The novel largely takes place around Chuffnell Hall, the home of Bertie's friend Lord "Chuffy" Chuffnell, who hopes to sell the house to the wealthy J. Washburn Stoker and is in love with Stoker's daughter Pauline.

== Plot ==
"Obviously, the fellow must be shoved over the brink."
"I do not quite follow you, sir."
"Of course you do. The thing's perfectly clear. Here's old Chuffy, for the nonce just hanging dumbly round the girl. What he needs is a jolt. If he thought there was grave danger of some other bloke scooping her up, wouldn't that make him forget these dashed silly ideas of his and charge in, breathing fire through the nostrils?"

— Bertie tells Jeeves his plan to spur Chuffy to propose

After a falling-out concerning Bertie's relentless playing of the banjolele, Jeeves leaves his master's service and finds work with Bertie's old friend, Lord "Chuffy" Chuffnell. Bertie travels to one of Chuffy's cottages in Somersetshire to practise the banjolele without complaints from neighbours. Chuffy hopes to sell his dilapidated manor to the rich J. Washburn Stoker. Mr Stoker plans to rent out the property to the famous "nerve specialist" (or, as Bertie prefers, "loony doctor") Sir Roderick Glossop, who intends to marry Chuffy's Aunt Myrtle. Chuffy has also fallen in love with Mr Stoker's daughter, Pauline Stoker, a former fiancée of Bertie, but feels unable to propose to her until his finances improve.

Bertie plans to kiss Pauline in front of Chuffy to spur Chuffy to propose but Mr Stoker sees the kiss. A fight between Mr Stoker's son Dwight and Chuffy's cousin Seabury divides the Chuffnells and Stokers. Mr Stoker returns to the yacht in which he and his family are staying. Thinking Bertie and Pauline are still in love, Stoker keeps Pauline on board to keep her from him. Chuffy writes a love letter to Pauline, which Jeeves smuggles aboard the yacht by briefly entering Mr Stoker's employ; Pauline is so moved that she swims ashore to Bertie's house, planning to visit Chuffnell Hall in the morning. Bertie lets her sleep in his bed while he tries to sleep in the garage. Unfortunately, he is seen by Police Sergeant Voules, who informs Lord Chuffnell. Chuffy, thinking Bertie is intoxicated, takes him back up to his bedroom. Seeing Pauline there, Chuffy assumes she and Bertie have resumed their romantic relationship. Chuffy and Pauline argue, and return to their respective homes.

The next day, Mr Stoker invites Bertie to his yacht, but locks him in one of the rooms. Stoker found out about Pauline's visit to Bertie, and plans to force them to marry. Jeeves helps Bertie escape: Mr Stoker has hired some blackface minstrels for his son's party, and Bertie disguises himself by blacking his face with boot polish to go ashore with them. Bertie returns to his cottage. His new valet, Brinkley, is drunk and chases Bertie with a carving knife, then sets the cottage on fire, destroying Bertie's banjolele. Searching for butter to remove the boot polish from his face, Bertie goes to Chuffnell Hall. Chuffy, thinking that Pauline loves Bertie and that Bertie should not try to abandon Pauline, refuses to give him butter.

Jeeves, again in Chuffy's employ, informs Bertie that Sir Roderick had blackened his face with boot polish to entertain Seabury; unappreciative, Seabury made a butter-slide using all the Hall's butter to make Sir Roderick fall, resulting in an altercation and Sir Roderick leaving the hall. Jeeves suggests that Bertie sleep in the Dower House, where Jeeves will bring him butter the next day; Brinkley is occupying the Dower House. Bertie sees Sir Roderick, who now feels friendly towards Bertie, since Bertie dislikes Seabury. Sir Roderick goes to Bertie's garage to find petrol, which he says can remove boot polish; Bertie, wishing to avoid Sergeant Voules, does not join him. Bertie sleeps in a summer-house.

In the morning, Bertie meets with Jeeves in Chuffy's office. Mr Stoker is looking for Bertie; Jeeves tells him that Bertie is in the Dower House. Pauline appears and Bertie reveals himself suddenly to her. Startled, Pauline shrieks, bringing Chuffy running to her. The couple reconciles. After Mr Stoker returns from a run-in with Brinkley, Jeeves delivers a cable saying that Mr Stoker's relatives are contesting the will of his late uncle, who left him fifty million dollars, on the grounds that the deceased was insane. Stoker is confident that Sir Roderick will testify against this; Sir Roderick has been arrested trying to break into Bertie's garage; his testimony will not have much weight if he is imprisoned. Jeeves suggests that Bertie switch places with Sir Roderick, as he could hardly be charged with breaking into his own garage. The plan succeeds. Stoker will buy the Hall, and Chuffy and Pauline are to be wed. Jeeves reveals that he was responsible for the cable. Stating that it has never been his policy to serve a married gentleman, Jeeves returns to Bertie's employ. Very surprised and grateful, Bertie has difficulty finding words, and simply says, "Thank you, Jeeves".

== Style ==
According to writer Robert McCrum, the plot of Thank You, Jeeves, which follows the separation and reconciliation of Bertie and Jeeves, "is constructed like a classic romance in which a couple quarrel, separate and are finally reunited". Author Kristin Thompson makes the same statement about the story's construction, and adds that despite the feud, Bertie and Jeeves interact in a friendly manner after their initial argument, which allows Bertie and Jeeves to work together to help Chuffy and Pauline and move towards reconciliation.

While Bertie Wooster is threatened with marriage in some of the earlier short stories in which he appears, he also faces other kinds of disaster which Jeeves helps him avoid. The emphasis of the plot shifts in Thank You, Jeeves. Beginning with this novel, Bertie's efforts to avoid marriage become the mainspring of the plot. This essential situation occurs in each of the following Jeeves novels. Bertie's language becomes considerably more formal starting in Thank You, Jeeves; this is acknowledged in chapter 4, when Bertie states that his vocabulary has improved due to Jeeves's influence. Another shift starting with Thank You, Jeeves is that, unlike many of the short stories, each Jeeves novel is set principally at a country house and the locality, allowing Wodehouse to bring more characters together to create longer, more complex stories.

Wodehouse uses various styles and language, moving between formal language in narration and informal language in dialogue. He sometimes makes fun of purism, the excessive insistence on adherence to a particular use of language, as in chapter 9:

"You have a perfect right to love who you like..."
"Whom, old man," I couldn't help saying. Jeeves has made me rather a purist in these matters.

In this quote, there is comic contrast between the tense situation and the comparatively petty concern about "correctness" in language.

Wodehouse occasionally derives words from phrases using suffixation, for example the adjective "fiend-in-human-shape-y" in chapter 12. A transferred epithet is used in chapter 2: "Such, then, is the sequence of events which led up to Bertram Wooster [...] standing at the door [...] through the aromatic smoke of a meditative cigarette". Bertie often uses unnecessary abbreviations, sometimes referring to words by only their initial letters. This can be seen in chapter 21, when Sir Roderick Glossop is imprisoned in a shed: "Can you remove Sir R. from the s., Jeeves?".

Another stylistic device Wodehouse uses to create humour is the pun. For example, a pun is used in chapter 1, after Jeeves gives notice

"No, sir. I fear I cannot recede from my position."
"But, dash it, you say you are receding from your position."
"I should have said, I cannot abandon the stand which I have taken."

Wodehouse uses vivid, exaggerated imagery drawing on a wide range of sources. This imagery at first seems comically incongruous and yet is appropriate to the situation. Examples include "We are the parfait gentle knights, and we feel that it ill beseems us to make a beeline for a girl like a man charging into a railway restaurant for a bowl of soup" (chapter 4) and "The light faded from her face, and in its stead there appeared the hurt, bewildered look of a barefoot dancer who, while halfway through the Vision of Salome, steps on a tin tack" (chapter 9).

When violence occurs in Wodehouse's stories, it causes either no injury or much less than would be expected in real life, similar to the downplayed injuries that occur in stage comedy. Wodehouse also sometimes references violent imagery where there is no actual violence, for example in Thank You, Jeeves, chapter 14: "The poor old lad distinctly leaped. The cigarette flew out of his hand, his teeth came together with a snap, and he shook visibly. The whole effect being much as if I had spiked him in the trousering with a gimlet or bodkin". By presenting an intentionally partial depiction of violence in comic situations and imagery, Wodehouse demonstrates that violence does not always need to be taken seriously and can be used to add amusement to a comic portrayal of existence.

Bertie, as the first-person narrator of the story, is an unreliable narrator in the sense that he does not know how much the events of the story result from Jeeves's scheming. The reader must infer to what extent Jeeves influences other characters or creates any of the problems he ultimately solves. It is possible that Jeeves schemes from the start to return to Bertie's employ, get rid of Bertie's banjolele and enters Chuffy's employment knowing that Chuffy would be near Bertie. Interpreting events through hints provided by Bertie's narration presents what Thompson calls "a perpetual and delightful challenge to the reader". Thompson suggests there is a hint that Jeeves may have deliberately led Bertie into trouble by arranging that Stoker rather than Chuffy saw Bertie kiss Pauline. When Bertie learns that Chuffy is jealous because Bertie was once engaged to Pauline, Bertie comments, "I began to perceive that in arranging that Stoker and not he should be the witness of the recent embrace the guardian angel of the Woosters had acted dashed shrewdly" (chapter 6). According to Thompson, "We know the identity of the somewhat diabolical guardian angel of this particular Wooster".

== Background ==
The book uses the dated and now derogatory term "nigger minstrels" which was once a common term for white performers in blackface. Blackface minstrels were a staple of British seaside resorts until World War II. The term "nigger minstrels" was historically used to differentiate blackface minstrels from "colored minstrels" who were actually black performers.

Blackface performances, widely considered offensive today, were popular at the time Wodehouse was writing this novel. During this period, Al Jolson, Bing Crosby and Shirley Temple were among the many actors who performed in blackface.

While planning Thank You, Jeeves, Wodehouse wrote a letter to his friend William Townend about ideas for the novel. In the letter, dated 1 April 1932, Wodehouse wrote that he was writing "a Jeeves novel where Bertie, who is blacked up like a nigger minstrel, is scouring the countryside for butter to remove his blacking". According to the letter, Wodehouse was considering ideas that do not appear in the final novel, including an idea of Bertie breaking into an animal breeder's house for butter and being confronted by a number of animals, and another idea in which Bertie ends up at a girls' school, gets chased by a Games Mistress (a woman who teaches sports), and subsequently hides in a dormitory, where the kids welcome him enthusiastically because they think he is a blackface minstrel.

== Publication history ==
The story was illustrated by Gilbert Wilkinson in the Strand and by James Montgomery Flagg in Cosmopolitan.

The novel was finished by the end of May 1932. Thank You, Jeeves appeared in serial form in the Canadian magazine Family Herald and Weekly Star from 24 March to 11 August 1937, with illustrations by James H. Hammon.

The 1977 Coronet paperback edition contains a glaring error. On the outer back cover, in the plot summary, Chuffy is referred to as 'Lord Chuffington'.

== Reception ==
- The Times (16 March 1934): "One thinks of the world of Mr. Wodehouse as being perfect, and therefore stable—a world in which there is no change nor need for change. It comes, therefore, as a shock to read in the publishers' note to his new book that Jeeves has been translated from his sphere of the short story. … There is a further and more disintegrating shock in the first chapter; it is headed 'Jeeves gives Notice,' and for a moment it leads the reader to fear that there is an end to his association with his employer, Mr. Bertram Wooster. … The ending is doubly happy; happy for the lovers, for about the last thing we learn of the leading lady is that 'She remained in Chuffy's arms gurgling like a leaky radiator'; and happy for the reader, for the last thing we learn of Jeeves is that he has re-entered the service of Mr. Wooster".
- John Chamberlain, The New York Times (23 April 1934): "Clifton Fadiman has a theory that P. G. Wodehouse gets his comic effects by judicious combination of understatement and overstatement, poetry and cold water. This is only the half of it. At the bottom of Mr. Wodehouse's genius is an ability to make his consonants dance, pirouette, leap, roll over and play dead. … Jeeves, good old Jeeves, silent as the Sphinx except when spoken to, saves the day for romance. The status of international marriage is preserved, in spite of the growing nationalism that bids fair to rob Mr. Wodehouse of many of his best situations. In brief, "Thank You, Jeeves!" is a satisfactory, a bonhomous, book, brought to no bad end".
- George Stevens, The Saturday Review (28 April 1934): "There is no way of reviewing this book that makes sense. To the Wodehouse following, it only requires announcement. To the others, who have tried Wodehouse and found themselves wanting, one can only say that they don't know what they are missing. One cannot go further. To say that his latest book is his funniest is a bromide; his latest book is always his funniest".
- The New York Times Book Review (29 April 1934): "The glory of Jeeves passes all overstatement. Footing it, as he would justly say, featly through the antic and astounding mazes of Bertie Wooster's hilarious career, he does some of the soundest brain-work of our epoch. … Chuffy falls impractically in love with Pauline, J. Washburn decides that Bertie must marry Pauline after all, Sir Roderick becomes enamored of the Dowager Lady Chuffnell, and, with all that to go on, one of Wodehouse's most pleasing pandemoniums gets going".
- Fanny Butcher, The Chicago Tribune (19 May 1934): "Mr. Wodehouse has written more times than I remember the same tale about the good-hearted but goofy young Englishman with more money than brains, his superior 'man,' and a series of impossible and hilarious situations in a (slanguage) language which is by Broadway out of Bond Street. But to those who find it to their taste it's the sweetest story ever told, Wodehouse's Old Sweet Song. I am one of those who get a thorough laughing jag on Wodehouse and the more utterly absurd he is the better, say I. He's utterly utter in "Thank You, Jeeves"'.

== Adaptations ==
=== Film ===
Thank You, Jeeves! is also the name of a theatrical film from 1936, starring Arthur Treacher as Jeeves and David Niven as Bertie Wooster, and directed by Arthur Greville Collins; aside from the presence of Bertie and Jeeves, however, none of the characters or major plot elements are taken from the novel. Bertie does play a musical instrument despite disapproval from Jeeves early in the film, though Bertie plays drums instead of a banjolele.

=== Television ===
This novel was adapted into the television series Jeeves and Wooster episodes "Chuffy" and "Kidnapped!", which first aired 5 May 1991 and 12 May 1991, respectively.

There are several differences in plot:

- the banjolele was replaced by a trombone, which Jeeves terms as "not an instrument for a gentleman."
- Sir Roderick Glossop does not appear in the first episode. Instead, Stoker originally wants to make the Hall a hotel.
- Mr. Manglehoffer, the manager of Berkeley Mansions, appears instead of Sir Roderick to give Bertie the ultimatum personally rather than via telephone.
- the cottage and Chuffy's manor are located in Devon, not Somersetshire.
- instead of being Chuffy's aunt Lady Chuffnell, Myrtle is his sister, Mrs. Pongleton. Sir Roderick Glossop is still married to Lady Glossop, and is never engaged to Myrtle.
- Brinkley's political views are never mentioned. Instead, he is portrayed as a grouchy, amoral, opportunistic, middle-aged man.
- In the first episode, Bertie's cottage catches fire when Chuffy tries to return Bertie to bed. Chuffy saves Pauline from the fire. Jeeves had intended for Stoker to discover Pauline in Bertie's room, so he would look more kindly on Chuffy. Jeeves returns to Bertie's employment and they go home.
- In the second episode, members of the Drones Club form the blackface minstrel troupe; in the original story, Bertie does not know the minstrels.
- Stoker locks both Bertie and Jeeves inside a room on his yacht.

=== Radio ===
Thank You, Jeeves was adapted into a radio drama in 1975 as part of the series What Ho! Jeeves starring Michael Hordern as Jeeves and Richard Briers as Bertie Wooster.

In 1998, the novel was dramatized by L.A. Theatre Works, with Paxton Whitehead voicing Jeeves and Simon Templeman voicing Bertie Wooster. Directed by Rosalind Ayres, the radio drama also featured Gregory Cooke as Chuffy, Jennifer Tilly as Pauline Stoker, Guy Siner as Sir Roderick Glossop, Kenneth Danziger as Sergeant Voules, Alastair Duncan as Brinkley and Seabury, and Dominic Keating as Constable Dobson. J. Washburn Stoker was voiced by Richard Riordan, who was Mayor of Los Angeles at the time of recording. In this adaptation, the minstrel musicians were changed to Appalachian hillbilly performers. To help Bertie escape from Stoker's yacht, Jeeves disguises Bertie as one of the performers by giving him a false beard, using dyed cotton wool applied with adhesive. Bertie then requires butter, like in the novel, to remove the adhesive. Mark Richard, who adapted the story for L.A. Theatre Works, had previously incorporated this change into a 1996 stage adaptation of the novel. Richard's adaptation was also used for a 2013 stage production of Thank You, Jeeves.
