= Kidnapper (disambiguation) =

A kidnapper is a person who performs a kidnapping.

Kidnapper may also refer to:

- Kidnapper (film), a 2010 Singaporean thriller film
- "Kidnapper" (song), by Blondie from the 1978 album Plastic Letters

== See also ==
- Kidnap (disambiguation)
- Kidnapped (disambiguation)
- Kidnapping (disambiguation)
