= Kidnap (disambiguation) =

To kidnap is to unlawfully take someone away and confine them against their will.

Kidnap may also refer to:

== Films ==
- Kidnap (1974 film), an Italian crime film
- Kidnap (2007 film), a Hong Kong thriller film starring Karena Lam and Rene Liu
- Kidnap (2008 film), an Indian Hindi-language action thriller
- Kidnap (2012 film), a short film by Ahmed Nimal
- Kidnap (2017 film), an American thriller film
- Kidnap (2019 film), a Bengali action thriller film
- Kidnap (2023 film), a Sri Lanka action film

== Television ==
- "Kidnap", fifth episode of the 1964 Doctor Who serial The Sensorites
- Kidnap (Philippine TV series), later Inagaw na Bituin, a 2019 Philippine TV drama musical series
- Kidnap (Thai TV series), a 2024 Thai TV series

== See also ==
- Kidnapping (disambiguation)
- Kidnapped (disambiguation)
- Kidnapper (disambiguation)
