= Samuel Boileau Goad =

India military figure

Goad, Samuel

Personal details
- Born: 21 August 1806 Madras
- Died: 13 December 1876 (aged 70) Simla
- Spouses: Emma Gordon Davidson (m. 1833) Frederica Blood (m. 1857)
- Children: Horatio Boileau Goad

Samuel Thomas Boileau Goad (21 August 1806 – 13 December 1876) was a major of the 1st Bengal European Light Cavalry and one of the principal property owners in Simla, India during the years of British rule. By his death, Goad had accumulated 33 properties in the town. The buildings were among the most valuable in Simla and included Barnes' Court, Kennedy House, the Park and Holly Lodge.

Samuel's father was Samuel Thomas Goad and his mother was Jane M. His paternal grandparents were William Goad and Darling Thomas. He was the oldest of seven children. He had four brothers and two sisters, named William, Henry, Charles, George, Anna and Maria.

Samuel married Emma Gordon Davidson, daughter of Leith Alexander Davidson, on 30 December 1833 in Calcutta Cathedral, India. Samuel secondly married Frederica Blood, daughter of Thomas Blood, on 12 November 1857 in Kasauli, Punjab (now Himachal Pradesh), India. Goad was the father of Horatio Boileau Goad and father-in-law of William Knight Treves, brother of Sir Frederick Treves, the surgeon associated with the Elephant Man, Joseph Merrick.

Samuel Boileau Goad committed suicide on 13 December 1876. He is one of the last people to be buried in Simla's Cart Road Cemetery.
