= False Dawn (short story) =

1888 short story by Rudyard Kipling

"False Dawn" is a short story by Rudyard Kipling. It was first published in the first Indian edition of Plain Tales from the Hills in 1888, and in subsequent editions of that collection.

== Plot summary ==
The story is set on an unnamed 'station,' or one of the posts where the British lived during the Raj. It is something of a backwater, "nearly a day's journey" from Lahore; and at the time of the story, "just before the final exodus of the Hill-goers", i.e., at the beginning of the hot season, there are under 20 British in residence. The story concerns Saumarez, a well-paid member of the Indian Civil Service who is "popular with women". He decides to propose marriage to one of a pair of sisters, Maud (the elder) and Edith Copleigh, who do everything together: the gossip of the station is that it will be to Maud, which would be an excellent match. She is prettier than her sister, though they are very alike in figure, look, and voice. Saumarez arranges a moonlight picnic for six couples to provide a romantic setting. After midnight, the supper is interrupted by a terrible dust storm, and confusion reigns. In a lull in the storm, the narrator (the usual persona of 'Kipling') hears Edith crying "O my God!" and asking to be taken home. He refuses till daylight, they separate - and then Saumarez says he's proposed to the wrong one. The narrator sees on Maud's face "that look on her face which only comes once or twice in a lifetime - when a woman is perfectly happy and the air is full of trumpets and gorgeously-coloured fire, and the Earth turns into a cloud because she loves and is loved." It is Saumarez's duty to wipe that look off her face. Kipling leaves him to it, galloping off to tell Edith, "You have got to come back with me, Miss Copleigh. Saumarez has something to tell you." They return home in the dawn, Maud riding with 'Kipling': "Maud Copleigh did not talk to me at any length."

All quotations in this article have been taken from the Uniform Edition of Plain Tales from the Hills published by Macmillan & Co., Limited in London in 1899. The text is that of the third edition (1890), and the author of the article has used his own copy of the 1923 reprint. Further comment, including page-by-page notes, can be found on the Kipling Society's website, at .
