= La Roy Sunderland =

American minister and abolitionist

La Roy Sunderland (May 18, 1804 – May 15, 1885) was an American minister and abolitionist. He left the Methodist Episcopal Church in 1842 after a dispute over slavery and helped organize the Wesleyan Methodist Church the next year. He was also a noted mental philosopher.

Sunderland was born on May 18, 1802 in Exeter, Rhode Island. He was an ordained clergyman in the Methodist Episcopal Church from 1826 to 1843, when he surrendered his credentials. He formed the Methodist Antislavery Society in 1834 and wrote the essay “An Appeal on the Subject of Slavery” in the newspaper Zion’s Herald that year as well supporting abolitionism. Sunderland founded the Wesleyan Methodist Church in 1842 around antislavery causes and Wesleyan theological ideas like sanctification.
