= Transportation and Warehouse Management System =

Software application supporting eCommerce, distribution, and third-party logistics

A transportation and warehouse management system (TWMS) is a software application that supports eCommerce, distribution, and third-party logistics (3PL) companies within supply chain management.

A TWMS aids supply chain managers in overseeing the daily operations of their business in the areas of organizing, directing, planning, shift and staff scheduling, inventory management, order receipt, order processing, picking, and shipping. It combines all of the aspects of a traditional transportation management system (TMS) with a warehouse management system (WMS) into one code set, removing the need for integrations. A TWMS takes traditional WMS and TMS software applications and improves upon them by removing the need to create an additional piece of software that enables them to communicate, called an integration.

== Traditional WMS ==
A WMS aids warehouse management in overseeing aspects of the supply chain including product handling from the time manufacturing of an item is complete, while it is en route to warehousing, and during warehousing, until it is sold and packaged for shipment.

== Traditional TMS ==
A TMS picks up where the WMS left off and handles all aspects of shipping sold goods from warehousing until it is in the possession of the end-user. A transportation management system is also a database driven computer application. It focuses on the part of the supply after a product is sold to the end user and is being prepared for shipment to its final destination. A generally accepted, streamlined framework for a (TMS) consists of the following:

- Support to Transportation system configuration
- Transport Planning
- Management Accounting
- Shipping Management

As shippers grow, their business needs change and it becomes necessary to incorporate more and more aspects of varying systems in order to fulfill orders. As needs change, shippers often find that integrating disparate systems into a conglomeration that contains all needed functionality poses risk. Integrations have to be constantly monitored by IT experts who work to keep breakdowns at bay, systems may not communicate well, downtime costs can be significant, and employees that are unable to be productive often become frustrated and lose the desire to work.

“These systems are key factors in integrating the physical flow of goods along the supply chain. The integration of these systems leads to global inventory visibility, which, in turn, leads to reduced costs and improved customer service by decreasing shipping and receiving cycle times, increasing shipment and inventory accuracy, and decreasing lead-time variability.”

A software application is considered a TWMS when it moves beyond the integration to which Mason et al. referred in the research, and is one application, with one code set for both the transportation and warehouse management aspects of supply chain management.

== The COVID-19 pandemic and its effect on eCommerce ==
When COVID-19 closed retail businesses all over the globe and it became necessary for the population to shelter in place, the world of commerce changed overnight. In order to survive, shopping online became a necessity and even those who were hesitant to adopt this practice adapted quickly. This experience put immense pressure on ecommerce in ways they had never anticipated, and eCommerce sellers were caught off-guard.

Bhatti, et al. stated, “Coronavirus Compelled Customers to Use Internet and Make it Habit in their Daily Routine." Furthermore, many challenges facing retailers in e-commerce, such as extended delivery times, difficulty faced during movement control, social distancing, and lockdown (Hasanat et al., 2020), made the process even more difficult.

== The need for a TWMS ==
Due to the speed at which ecommerce was growing, shippers needed systems that better combined all of their activities into one seamless system, without integrations that could potentially slow down the warehousing, processing, and shipping of goods. From this need, a TWMS became the next important step in supply chain management software.

The first true, seamless, TWMS to be commercially available was created by iDrive Logistics, based in Lehi, Utah in the United States, called ShipCaddie TWMS. It combined all of the functionality of a WMS and a TMS into one, seamless system without the use of integrations to tie the pieces together.

== Functionalities ==
=== Overall ===
- Software as a Service (SaaS) model
- Integration with accounting software
- Data Dashboard
- Customizable Reporting
- Workflow Management

=== Warehouse management ===
- Location Control
- Picking list creation
- Packing
- Invoicing
- Advance incoming shipment notifications
- Incoming carrier shipping data
- Pick session details

=== Inventory management ===
- Product Management
- Batch Processing
- Backorder inventory management
- SKU tracking
- Receiving and Putaway
- Stock level control
- Lot number/expiration tracking
- Production kitting
- Virtual warehouse management
- SKU management

=== Order management ===
- Synchronization with marketplaces
- Purchase order management
- Return authorization
- Damage order processing
- Packing audit

=== Transportation management ===
- Real-Time AI to route shipments
- Integration with marketplace and eCommerce platforms
- Carrier integration
- Address validation
- Email templates
- Reporting
- Scale Integration
- Barcoding printing/Batch Printing
- Barcode Scanning
- Shipment Management/Automation
- Return management
- Presets for shipping sites
- Presets for Carriers
- Presets for Packages
- Package Types
- Custom Templates
- Manifests

=== Customer relationship management ===
- Contact Manager
