= Kidnapped! (Jeeves and Wooster) =

- Jeeves and Wooster episode
- Episode no.: Season 2 Episode 5
- Directed by: Simon Langton
- Original air date: 12 May 1991

Episode chronology
← Previous "Chuffy"	Next → "Wooster with a Wife"

"Kidnapped!" is the fifth episode of the second series of the 1990s British comedy television series Jeeves and Wooster. It is also called "The Mysterious Stranger". It first aired in the UK on 12 May 1991 on ITV.

In the US, "Kidnapped!" was one of five episodes of Jeeves and Wooster that were not aired as part of the original broadcast of the television series on Masterpiece Theatre, though all episodes were made available on US home video releases.

== Background ==
Adapted from Thank You, Jeeves. Chuffnell Regis parts were filmed in Clovelly, Devon.

== Cast ==
- Jeeves – Stephen Fry
- Bertie Wooster – Hugh Laurie
- "Chuffy", Lord Chuffnell – Matthew Solon
- Pauline Stoker – Sharon Holm
- J. Washburn Stoker – Manning Redwood
- Dwight Stoker – James Holland
- Myrtle Pongleton – Fidelis Morgan
- Seabury Pongleton – Edward Holmes
- Sir Roderick Glossop – Roger Brierley
- Lady Glossop – Jane Downs
- Barmy Fotheringay-Phipps – Martin Clunes
- Oofy Prosser – Richard Dixon
- Sgt. Voules – Dave Atkins
- Dobson – William Waghorn
- Aunt Hilda – Cynthia Grenville
- Station Master – Gordon Salkilld
- Drones Porter – Michael Ripper

== Plot ==
Bertie's club, the Drones Club, are electing a new dining committee chairman. Bertie wishes to be elected, but discovers that no one with a criminal record can stand. The trip results in startling results, including an encounter with several Drones in blackface.

Pauline Stoker is being stalked by a mysterious stranger. Bertie, always chivalrous, is called upon to protect her on her way back to Chuffnell Regis.

Because Lord Chuffnell ("Chuffy") cannot get permission to turn Chuffnell Hall into a hotel, Pauline tries to persuade Sir Roderick Glossop to turn it into a sanatorium. Glossop initially views Bertie as mentally unstable.

Bertie is kidnapped by Pauline Stoker's father, who wants Bertie to marry his daughter. But Bertie escapes by posing as one of the Barmy's blackface musicians.

All musicians and Sir Roderick, Stoker and Bertie are arrested in blackface. Sir Roderick, Stoker and Bertie become civil to each other and they patch up their differences after having been obliged to blacken their faces for different reasons.

And they get in front of Chuffy as the local magistrate, who releases the prisoners Sir Roderick, Stoker and Bertie. Sir Roderick, Stoker and Bertie are going undercover using snazzy aliases so that they aren't recognized: Sir Roderick as Alfred Trotsky, Stoker as Frederick Aloisius Lenin and Bertie as Dr. Crippen. But all musicians of Bertie's club, the Drones, are punished by Chuffy. The musicians of Bertie's club, the Drones, now have all a criminal record.

Chuffy, as the local magistrate, says: ″... you, Alfred Trotsky, and you, Frederick Aloisius Lenin, were led astray. You are discharged. But as for the rest of you: Boko Disraeli, Oofy Lloyd George, Barmy, Lord Tennyson, and the rest—not only have you been guilty of a breach of the peace of considerable magnitude, I also strongly suspect that you have given false names and addresses! You are each fined the sum of five pounds... Quiet, Dr. Crippen″

== See also ==
- List of Jeeves and Wooster characters
