= Cupid's Arrows =

1888 short story by Rudyard Kipling

"Cupid's Arrows" is a short story by Rudyard Kipling. It was first published in 1888 in the collection Plain Tales from the Hills.

== Plot ==
This story is a Kiplingesque investigation - that is to say a strange combination of close observation, some mild satire of the strangeness of social conventions, and an acceptance of their strangeness, from the rather distant stance of an observer - of matters of love and marriage. It begins with "a very pretty girl, the daughter of a poor but honest District and Sessions Judge ... Her Mamma was very anxious about her daughter's future, as all good Mammas should be." There is also (at Simla) Barr-Saggott, a rich man of high status - a Commissioner, no less - but ugly. "When he turned his attentions to Miss Beighton, I believe that Mrs Beighton wept with delight at the reward Providence had sent her in her old age." (In one of Kipling's very 'knowing' asides, designed to convince readers of his veracity, he says "the ugliest man in Asia, with two exceptions." This [our emphasis] may also be a 'tongue-in-cheek mock of the habits in certain British circles of immense and fashionable hyperbole.) Kitty Beighton's thoughts are with young Cubbon, a junior officer - "a boy" - in a cavalry regiment.

At the time of the story, some time after 1850, archery was the fashionable sport among the administrative classes; and Miss Beighton "shot divinely". Commissioner Barr-Saggott offers a magnificent prize - a diamond studded bracelet - for a ladies' tournament of archery, "and every one saw that the bracelet was a gift to Miss Beighton; the acceptance carrying with it the hand and heart of Commissioner Barr-Saggott." Miss Beighton shoots last. Her first shot is a bull's eye, and Barr-Saggott smiles. "Now horses used to shy when Barr-Saggott smiled. Kitty saw that smile. She looked to her left-front, gave an almost imperceptible nod to Cubbon, and went on shooting" - with great skill, but no further high-scoring shots. She records 21q, out of as possible 324, and the prize is won by "a little snubby, mottled, half-grown girl"." Mrs Beighton weeps, in front of all the people (all the 'best sort' are present). Miss Beighton leaves with Cubbon, instead of her Mamma; "and - the rest isn't worth printing."

All quotations in this article have been taken from the Uniform Edition of Plain Tales from the Hills published by Macmillan & Co., Limited in London in 1899. The text is that of the third edition (1890), and the author of the article has used his own copy of the 1923 reprint. Further comment, including page-by-page notes, can be found on the Kipling Society's website, at .
