= Three and – an Extra =

"Three and – an Extra" is the earliest appearance in Kipling's books of the character Mrs. Hauksbee. It was first published in the Civil and Military Gazette on November 17, 1886, and first in book form in Plain Tales from the Hills, in 1888. It reports a defeat of "the clever, witty, brilliant and sparkling" Mrs. Hauksbee by Mrs. Cusack-Bremmil - in the former's predatory pursuit of Mr. Cusack-Bremmil.

Three years after the Cusack-Bremmils' marriage, Mrs. Bremmil is grieving for the death of their baby. "Perhaps Bremmil ought to have comforted her", but although he tries, he does not succeed. Instead, he becomes attached to Mrs. Hauksbee, causing gossip. The Bremmils are invited to a Ball given by Lord Lytton, the Viceroy: she says she will stay at home, and he takes Mrs. Hauksbee. However Mrs. Bremmil goes on her own, with a magnificent gown, and reawakens his affection: they leave together, early.

"Then said Mrs. Hauksbee to me - she looked a trifle faded and jaded in the lamplight - 'Take my word for it, the silliest woman can manage a clever man; but it needs a very clever woman to manage a fool.'

Then we went in to supper."

All quotations in this article have been taken from the Uniform Edition of Plain Tales from the Hills published by Macmillan & Co., Limited in London in 1899. The text is that of the third edition (1890), and the author of the article has used his own copy of the 1923 reprint. Further comment, including page-by-page notes, can be found on the Kipling Society's website, at
