= Mrs. Hauksbee =

Mrs. Hauksbee is a fictional character in many short stories by Rudyard Kipling. In the first, "Three and - an Extra", she is introduced as:

Mrs Hauksbee appeared on the horizon; and where she existed was fair chance of trouble. At Simla her by-name was the 'Stormy Petrel'. She had won that title five times to my certain knowledge.... She was clever, witty, brilliant, and sparkling beyond most of her kind; but possessed of many devils of malice and mischievousness. She could be nice, though, even to her own sex. But that is another story.

Four stories later in the same volume, there is a story where she is shown in a good light - "The Rescue of Pluffles". In "Consequences", she does Tarrion's career great service. In "Kidnapped", she does Peythroppe equally great service, against his will.

Mrs Hauksbee exemplifies many of the characteristics of Rudyard Kipling's characteristic writing. She is partly a stereotype (in this case, of the clever woman of the ruling classes [here, the British in India; and the administrative class of them]), and yet a very clearly delineated individual member of that stereotypical group. Her motivations are not simple nor clear cut.

Physically, "She was a little, brown, thin, almost skinny, woman, with big, rolling, violet-blue eyes and the sweetest manners in the world" ('Three and - an Extra'). A characteristic gesture when she is thinking is to draw the lash of her riding whip between her lips - which may indicate her underlying cruelty. There is something feline about her.

Her character is dominated by her cleverness. She likes to gather the intelligent and the young around her. Tarrion, in "Consequences", "because he was clever and amusing, ... gravitated naturally to Mrs Hauksbee, who could forgive everything but stupidity". "She had the wisdom of the Serpent, the logical coherence of the Man, the fearlessness of the Child, and the triple intuition of the Woman" "Kidnapped").

In essence, she is the clever woman who is to be seen as far more clever than men. A characteristic thought is "What fools men are!"
