= Thrown Away =

1888 short story by Rudyard Kipling

"Thrown Away" is a short story by British author Rudyard Kipling. It was published in the first Indian edition of Plain Tales from the Hills (1888), and in subsequent editions of that collection.

"Thrown Away" tells of an unnamed 'Boy', a product of the English "sheltered life system" that Kipling abhors:

"Let a puppy eat the soap in the bath-room or chew a newly-blacked boot. He chews and chuckles until, by and by, he finds out that blacking and Old Brown Windsor make him very sick; so he argues that soap and boots are not wholesome. Any old dog about the house will soon show him the unwisdom of biting big dogs' ears. Being young, he remembers and goes abroad, at six months, a well-mannered little beast with a chastened appetite. If he had been kept away from boots, and soap, and big dogs till he came to the trinity full-grown and with developed teeth, just consider how fearfully sick and thrashed he would be! Apply that motion to the "sheltered life," and see how it works."

Having been protected from all unpleasantness, the Boy has not been toughened and has not learned "the proper proportions of things". The Boy is sent to India, not having met his parents' expectations at Sandhurst, and becomes a subaltern in an Indian regiment. "This Boy — the tale is as old as the hills — came out and took all things seriously": he quarrels, and remembers disagreements; he gambles; he flirts, and is too serious; he loses money and health; he is reprimanded by his Colonel. When, finally, he is insulted (thoughtlessly) by a woman, he contemplates, and then asks for shooting leave, to go after Big Game where only partridge are to be found. He takes a revolver.

A Major (also nameless) who has taken an interest in the Boy returns from his own leave, and fearing the worst presses the narrator to go with him to visit the Boy. ("'Can you lie?'", the Major asks; "'You know best,' I answered. 'It's my profession'" says the journalist Kipling, ever self-deprecating.) After a furious drive, they find the Boy dead, by suicide — as the Major had feared. They discreetly bury him, concocting a story of cholera. They discover letters that the Boy has written to the Colonel, to the Boy's mother, and to a girl in England. They are moved to tears by reading the letters, but they burn them, and concoct a letter to the Boy's mother, telling the lie about cholera, and others about his great promise etc., which earns her undying gratitude - "the obligation she would be under to us as long as she lived." "All things considered, she was under an obligation, but not exactly as she meant." The Major reveals the cause of his concern — he too had despaired when he was young, and he sympathised with the Boy.

The story has keen psychological observations (the conspirators' combined laughter and choking fits as they prepare their lies) and telling narrative detail. For example, although they are tired, the Major and the narrator remember to "put away [the Boy's] revolver with the proper amount of cartridges in the pouch" in his room.

All quotations in this article have been taken from the Uniform Edition of Plain Tales from the Hills published by Macmillan & Co., Limited in London in 1899. The text is that of the third edition (1890), and the author of the article has used his own copy of the 1923 reprint. Further comment, including page-by-page notes, can be found here on the Kipling Society's website.
