= The Civil and Military Gazette =

Newspaper published in India, 1872–1963

- Type: Daily newspaper
- Publisher: E.A. Smedley
- Founded: 1872
- Ceased publication: August 31, 1963
- Language: English
- Headquarters: Lahore, British India (later Pakistan)

The Civil and Military Gazette was a daily English-language newspaper founded in 1872 in British India. It was published from Lahore, Simla and Karachi, some times simultaneously, until its closure in 1963. The archives are owned by Lahore-based businessman Humayun Naseer Shaikh and have been digitized by Sharmeen Obaid-Chinoy's Citizens Archive of Pakistan.

== History ==
The Civil and Military Gazette (Lahore)
- Type: Daily newspaper
- Editor: Stephen Wheeler (??–1886); E. Kay Robinson (1886–??)
- Associate editor: Rudyard Kipling (1882–1887)
- Founded: 1872
- Ceased publication: September 13, 1963
- Language: English
- Headquarters: Lahore, British India (later Pakistan)

The Civil and Military Gazette (Simla)
- Type: Daily newspaper
- Founded: 1872
- Ceased publication: February 12, 1949
- Language: English
- Headquarters: Simla, British India (later India)

The Civil and Military Gazette (Karachi)
- Type: Daily newspaper
- Founded: February 3, 1949
- Ceased publication: March 31, 1953
- Language: English
- Headquarters: Karachi, British India (later Pakistan)

The Civil and Military Gazette was founded in Lahore and Simla in 1872. It was a merger of The Mofussilite in Calcutta, and the Lahore Chronicle and Indian Public Opinion and Panjab Times in Lahore.

The Lahore and Simla editions of the paper continued to be published concurrently until 1949, when the Simla branch was closed.

The Civil and Military Gazette began publishing in Karachi a week before its branch in Simla closed. However, the CMG in Karachi was very short-lived, the publication lasting a mere 4 years.

During the CMG's publication in Lahore, Simla, and Karachi, the frequency of publication changed thrice as follows:

Date changed	Until	Frequency of Publication	Branches affected
January 2, 1929	November 14, 1932	Daily (except Tuesday)	Lahore, Simla
November 15, 1932	December 27, 1932	Daily	Lahore, Simla
June 1, 1945	October 24, 1949	Daily (except Monday)	Lahore, Karachi

== Notable staff members ==
=== Rudyard Kipling ===
The Civil and Military Gazette was the workplace of renowned British author and poet, Rudyard Kipling. It was referred to by Kipling as his "mistress and most true love."

Kipling was assistant editor of the CMG, a job procured for him by his father, who was curator of the Lahore Museum, when it was decided that he lacked the academic ability to get into Oxford University on a scholarship.

When Kipling joined the staff at the Lahore CMG in 1882, the editor-in-chief was Stephen Wheeler. 1886 brought a change of editors at the newspaper. Kay Robinson, the new editor, allowed more creative freedom, and Kipling was asked to contribute short stories to the newspaper. His first collection of short stories, Plain Tales from the Hills, contained 28 stories that had initially found publication in the CMG.

Rudyard Kipling eventually left The Civil and Military Gazette in 1887, to move to its sister-newspaper in Allahabad, The Pioneer.

=== CE Newham ===
CE Newham remained acting editor of the paper during 1928-1929. After that he remained editor during 1929-1930.

=== Abdul Hamid Sheikh ===
The last editor of the CMG was Abdul Hamid Sheikh, who wrote Lahore Notes under 'HS' in The Pakistan Times after the CMG shut down.

=== Mahbub Jamal Zahedi ===
Mahbub Jamal Zahedi joined The Civil and Military Gazette in 1963, at a time when its last branch, situated in Lahore, was about to cease publication. He served there for only a few months, before he moved to Dawn in Karachi.
