= Rudyard Kipling bibliography =

This is a bibliography of works by Rudyard Kipling, including books, short stories, poems, and collections of his works.

== Books ==
(These are short story collections except as noted. Listed by year of publication.)

- The City of Dreadful Night (1885), short story
- Departmental Ditties (1886), poetry
- Plain Tales from the Hills (1888)
  - "Lispeth" (short story)
  - "Three and – an Extra" (short story)
  - "Thrown Away" (short story)
  - "Miss Youghal's Sais" (short story)
  - "'Yoked with an Unbeliever'" (short story)
  - "False Dawn" (short story)
  - "The Rescue of Pluffles" (short story)
  - "Cupid's Arrows" (short story)
  - "The Three Musketeers" (short story)
  - "His Chance in Life" (short story)
  - "Watches of the Night" (short story)
  - "The Other Man" (short story)
  - "Consequences" (short story)
  - "The Conversion of Aurelian McGoggin" (short story)
  - "The Taking of Lungtungpen" (short story)
  - "A Germ-Destroyer" (short story)
  - "Kidnapped" (short story)
  - "The Arrest of Lieutenant Golightly" (short story)
  - "In the House of Suddhoo" (short story)
  - "His Wedded Wife" (short story)
  - "The Broken-link Handicap" (short story)
  - "Beyond the Pale" (short story)
  - "In Error" (short story)
  - "A Bank Fraud" (short story)
  - "Tod's Amendment" (short story)
  - "The Daughter of the Regiment" (short story)
  - "In the Pride of his Youth" (short story)
  - "Pig" (short story)
  - "The Rout of the White Hussars" (short story)
  - "The Bronckhorst Divorce-case" (short story)
  - "Venus Annodomini" (short story)
  - "The Bisara of Pooree" (short story)
  - "A Friend's Friend" (short story)
  - "The Gate of the Hundred Sorrows" (short story)
  - "The Madness of Private Ortheris" (short story)
  - "The Story of Muhammad Din" (short story)
  - "On the Strength of a Likeness" (short story)
  - "Wressley of the Foreign Office" (short story)
  - "By Word of Mouth" (short story)
  - "To be Filed for Reference" (short story)
- Soldiers Three (1888)
- The Story of the Gadsbys (1888)
- In Black and White (1888)
- Under the Deodars (1888)
- The Phantom 'Rickshaw and other Eerie Tales (1888) – including "The Man Who Would Be King"
- Wee Willie Winkie and Other Child Stories (1888) – including "Baa Baa, Black Sheep"
- American Notes (1891), non-fiction
- Letters of Marque (1891)
- The City of Dreadful Night and Other Places (1891) – A.H. Wheeler & Co (Indian Railway Library #14)
- Mine Own People (John W. Lovell Company, New York City, NY, March 1891)
  - Introduction by Henry James
  - "Bimi" (later re-published as "Bertran and Bimi")
  - "Namgay Doola"
  - "The Recrudescence of Imray" (later re-published as "The Return of Imray")
  - "Moti Guj -- Mutineer"
  - "The Mutiny of the Mavericks"
  - "At the End of the Passage"
  - "The Incarnation of Krishna Mulvaney"
  - "The Courting of Dinah Shadd"
  - "The Man Who Was"
  - "A Conference of the Powers"
  - "On Greenhow Hill"
  - "Without Benefit of Clergy"
- Life's Handicap (MacMillan and Co., London, August 1891)
  - "The Lang Men o' Larut"
  - "Reingelder and the German Flag"
  - "The Wandering Jew"
  - "Through the Fire"
  - "The Finances of the Gods"
  - "The Amir's Homily"
  - "Jews in Shushan"
  - "The Limitations of Pambé Serang"
  - "Little Tobrah"
  - "Bubbling Well Road"
  - "'The City of Dreadful Night'"
  - "Georgie Porgie"
  - "Naboth"
  - "The Dream of Duncan Parrenness"
  - "The Incarnation of Krishna Mulvaney"
  - "The Courting of Dinah Shadd"
  - "On Greenhow Hill"
  - "The Man Who Was"
  - "The Head of the District"
  - "Without Benefit of Clergy"
  - "At the End of the Passage"
  - "The Mutiny of the Mavericks"
  - "The Mark of the Beast"
  - "The Recrudescence of Imray" (later re-published as "The Return of Imray")
  - "Namgay Doola"
  - "Bimi" (later re-published as "Bertran and Bimi")
  - "Moti Guj -- Mutineer"
  - "L'envoi"
- Barrack-Room Ballads (1892), poetry
- Many Inventions (1893)
- The Jungle Book (1894) – including Mowgli stories, here marked "(M)":
  - "Mowgli's Brothers" (M) (short story)
  - "Hunting-Song of the Seeonee Pack" (poem)
  - "Kaa's Hunting" (M) (short story)
  - "Road-Song of the Bandar-Log" (poem)
  - "Tiger! Tiger!" (M) (short story)
  - "Mowgli's Song That He Sang at the Council Rock When He Danced on Shere Khan's Hide" (poem)
  - "The White Seal" (short story)
  - "Lukannon" (poem)
  - "Rikki-Tikki-Tavi" (short story)
  - "Darzee's Chaunt (Sung in Honour of Rikki-Tikki-Tavi)" (poem)
  - "Toomai of the Elephants" (short story)
  - "Shiv and the Grasshopper (The Song That Toomai's Mother Sang to the Baby)" (poem)
  - "Her Majesty's Servants" (short story) – originally titled "Servants of the Queen"
  - "Parade-Song of the Camp Animals" (poem)
- The Second Jungle Book (1895) – including Mowgli stories, here marked "(M)":
  - "How Fear Came" (M) (short story)
  - "The Law of the Jungle" (poem)
  - "The Miracle of Purun Bhagat" (short story)
  - "A Song of Kabir" (poem)
  - "Letting in the Jungle" (M) (short story)
  - "Mowgli's Song Against People" (poem)
  - "The Undertakers" (short story)
  - "A Ripple Song" (poem)
  - "The King's Ankus" (M) (short story)
  - "The Song of the Little Hunter" (poem)
  - "Quiquern" (short story)
  - "'Angutivaun Taina'" (poem)
  - "Red Dog" (M) (short story)
  - "Chil's Song" (poem)
  - "The Spring Running" (M) (short story)
  - "The Outsong" (poem)
- The Naulahka: A Story of West and East (1892)
- The Seven Seas (1896), poetry
- The Day's Work (1898)
- A Fleet in Being (1898)
- The Brushwood Boy (1899), story from 1895, illus. Orson Lowell; US only?
- Stalky & Co. (1899)
- From Sea to Sea and Other Sketches, Letters of Travel (1899), non-fiction
- Just So Stories for Little Children (1902)
  - "How the Whale Got His Throat" – First published in St Nicholas Magazine, December 1897, as "How the Whale Got His Tiny Throat"
  - "How the Camel Got His Hump"
  - "How the Rhinoceros Got His Skin"
  - "How the Leopard Got His Spots"
  - "The Elephant's Child"
  - "The Sing-Song of Old Man Kangaroo"
  - "The Beginning of the Armadillos"
  - "How the First Letter Was Written"
  - "How the Alphabet Was Made"
  - "The Crab That Played With the Sea"
  - "The Cat That Walked by Himself"
  - "The Butterfly That Stamped"
  - "The Tabu Tale" (published in the US in 1903)
- The Five Nations (1903), poetry
- Traffics and Discoveries (1904), 12 stories
- With the Night Mail: A Story of 2000 A.D. Available online (1905) – "(Together with extracts from the magazine in which it appeared)"
- They (1905), story from Traffics and Discoveries
- Puck of Pook's Hill (1906)
- The Brushwood Boy (1907), 1895 story, illus. F. H. Townsend; UK and US
- Actions and Reactions (1909)

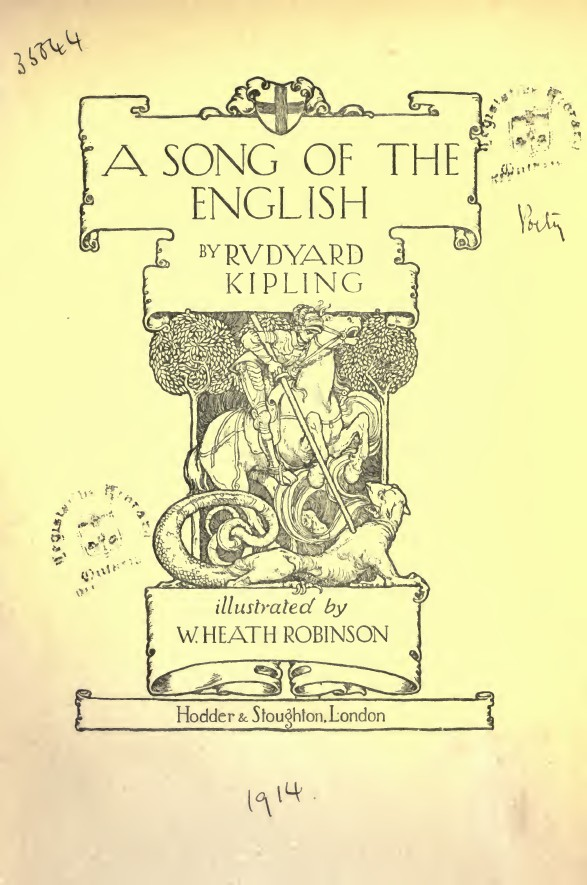
A Song of the English illustrated by W. Heath Robinson, 1914

- A Song of the English (1909), with W. Heath Robinson (illustrator)
- Rewards and Fairies (1910)
- A History of England (1911), non-fiction, with Charles Robert Leslie Fletcher
- Songs from Books (1912)
- As Easy as A.B.C. (1912), science-fiction short story
- The Fringes of the Fleet (1915), non-fiction
- Sea Warfare (1916), non-fiction
- A Diversity of Creatures (1917)
- The Years Between (1919), poetry
- Land and Sea Tales for Scouts and Guides (1923)
- The Irish Guards in the Great War (1923), non-fiction
- Debits and Credits (1926)
- A Book of Words (1928), non-fiction
- Thy Servant a Dog (1930)
- Limits and Renewals (1932)
- Tales of India (The Windermere Series, Rand McNally, 1935), illus. Paul Strayer
- Something of Myself (1937), autobiography
- The Muse Among the Motors (1904, 1919, 1929), poetry – unknown first publication as a whole

== Novels ==
- The Light that Failed (1891)
- The Naulahka: A Story of West and East (1892) (with Wolcott Balestier)
- Captains Courageous (1896)
- Kim (1901)

== Collections ==
Some of Kipling's works were collected by him; some others were collected by publishers of "unauthorised" editions (Abaft the Funnel, From Sea to Sea, for example). Still others of his works were never collected. The lists given below include all the collections that Kipling acknowledged as his own work. However, it is possible to find other works that appeared in American but not English editions, works that only appeared in an original periodical publication, and some others that only appeared in the Sussex and Burwash editions.

=== Autobiographies and speeches ===
- Independence. Rectorial Address Delivered at St. Andrews, 10 October 1923
- A Book of Words (1928)
- Something of Myself (1937)
- Rudyard Kipling's Uncollected Speeches: A Second Book of Words (2008), ed. Thomas Pinney, ELT Press

=== Short story collections ===
- Quartette (1885) – with his father, mother, and sister
- Plain Tales from the Hills (1888)
- Soldiers Three, The Story of the Gadsbys, In Black and White (1888)
- The Phantom 'Rickshaw and other Eerie Tales (1888)
- Under the Deodars (1888)
- Wee Willie Winkie and Other Child Stories (1888)
- Mine Own People (1891)
- Life's Handicap (1891)
- Many Inventions (1893)
- The Jungle Book (1894)
- The Second Jungle Book (1895)
- The Day's Work (1898)
- Stalky & Co. (1899)
- Just So Stories (1902)
- Traffics and Discoveries (1904)
- Puck of Pook's Hill (1906) – children's historical fantasy short stories
- Actions and Reactions (1909)
- Abaft the Funnel (1909)
- Rewards and Fairies (1910) – historical fantasy short stories
- The Eyes of Asia (1917)
- A Diversity of Creatures (1917)
- Land and Sea Tales for Scouts and Guides (1923)
- Debits and Credits (1926)
- Thy Servant a Dog (1930)
- Limits and Renewals (1932)

=== Military collections ===
- A Fleet in Being (1898)
- France at War (1915)
- The New Army in Training (1915)
- Sea Warfare (1916)
- The War in the Mountains (1917)
- The Graves of the Fallen (1919)
- The Irish Guards in the Great War (1923)

=== Poetry collections ===
- Schoolboy Lyrics (1881)
- Echoes (1884) – with his sister, Alice ('Trix')
- Departmental Ditties (1886)
- Barrack-Room Ballads (1890)
- The Seven Seas (1896)
- An Almanac of Twelve Sports (1898, with illustrations by William Nicholson)
- The Five Nations (1903)
- Collected Verse (1907)
- Songs from Books (1912)
- The Years Between (1919)
- Rudyard Kipling's Verse: Definitive Edition (1940)

=== Travel collections ===
- From Sea to Sea – Letters of Travel: 1887–1889 (1899)
- Letters of Travel: 1892–1913 (1920)
- Souvenirs of France (1933)
- Brazilian Sketches: 1927 (1940)

=== Most complete collected sets ===
- The Outward Bound Edition (New York), 1897–1937 – 36 volumes
- The Edition de Luxe (London), 1897–1937 – 38 volumes
- The Bombay Edition (London), 1913–38 – 31 volumes
- The Sussex Edition (London), 1937–39 – 35 volumes
- The Burwash Edition (New York), 1941 – 28 volumes

The last two of these editions include volume(s) of "uncollected prose".

== Poems ==
=== His own collections ===
Collections issued during his lifetime by the poet himself include:

- Departmental Ditties and Other Verses, 1886.
- Barrack Room Ballads, 1889, republished with additions at various times.
- The Seven Seas and Further Barrack-Room Ballads, in various editions 1891–96.
- The Five Nations, with some new and some reprinted (often revised) poems, 1903.
- Twenty-two original 'Historical Poems' contributed to C.R.L. Fletcher's A History of England (a cheaper edition was sold as A School History of England), 1911.
- Songs from Books, 1912.
- The Years Between, 1919.

=== Posthumous collections ===
Posthumous collections of Kipling's poems include:

- Rudyard Kipling’s Verse: Definitive Edition.
- A Choice of Kipling's Verse, edited by T. S. Eliot (Faber and Faber, 1941).
- Early verse by Rudyard Kipling, 1879–1889 : unpublished, uncollected, and rarely collected poems, Oxford : Clarendon Press, 1986.
- The Surprising Mr Kipling, edited by Brian Harris, 2014

=== Individual poems ===
Some of Kipling's many poems are:

- "The Absent-Minded Beggar"
- "The Advertisement"
- "An American"
- "The American Rebellion"
- "Anchor Song"
- "Angutivaun Taina"
- "The Answer"
- "The Anvil"
- "Arithmetic on the Frontier"
- "Army Headquarters"
- "Arterial"
- "As the Bell Clinks"
- "An Astrologer's Song"
- "At His Execution"
- "Azrael's Count"
- "Back to the Army Again"
- "The Ballad of Boh Da Thone"
- "The Ballad of Bolivar"
- "A Ballad of Burial"
- "The Ballad of the Cars"
- "The Ballad of the "Clampherdown""
- "The Ballad of East and West"
- "Ballad of Fisher's Boarding-House"
- "A Ballad of Jakko Hill"
- "The Ballad of the King's Jest"
- "The Ballad of the King's Mercy"
- "The Ballad of Minepit Shaw"
- "The Ballad of the Red Earl"
- "Banquet Night"
- "Beast and Man in India"
- "The Bee-Boy's Song"
- "The Bees and Flies"
- "Before a Midnight Breaks in Storm"
- "The Beginner"
- "The Beginnings"
- "The Bells and Queen Victoria"
- "The Bell Buoy"
- "The Benefactors"
- "Belts"
- "The Betrothed"
- "Big Steamers"
- "Bill 'awkins"
- "Birds of Prey March"
- "The Birthright"
- "Blue Roses"
- "Bobs"
- "Boots"
- "The Bother"
- "The Boy Scouts' Patrol Song"
- "The Braggart"
- "Bridge-Guard in the Karroo"
- "A British-Roman Song"
- "The Broken Men"
- "Brookland Road"
- "Brown Bess"
- "Buddha at Kamakura"
- "The Burden"
- "The Burial"
- "Butterflies"
- "By the Hoof of the Wild Goat"
- "Cain and Abel"
- "The Captive"
- "Carmen Circulare"
- "A Carol"
- "Cells"
- "The Centaurs"
- "Certain Maxims of Hafiz"
- "The Changelings"
- "Chant-Pagan"
- "Chapter Headings"
- "A Charm"
- "Chartres Windows"
- "The Children's Song"
- "A Child's Garden"
- "Cholera Camp"
- "Christmas in India"
- "Cities and Thrones and Powers"
- "The City of Brass"
- "The City of Sleep"
- "Cleared"
- "The Coastwise Lights"
- "A Code of Morals"
- "The Coiner"
- "Cold Iron"
- "Columns"
- "The Comforters"
- "The Consolations of Memory"
- "Contradictions"
- "The Conundrum of the Workshops"
- "A Counting-Out Song"
- "Covenant"
- "The Craftsman"
- "Cruisers"
- "Cuckoo Song"
- "The Cure"
- "Dane-geld"
- "Danny Deever"
- "Darzee's Chaunt"
- "The Dawn Wind"
- "The Day's Work"
- "The Dead King"
- "A Death-Bed"
- "The Declaration of London"
- "Dedication"
- "A Dedication"
- "The Deep-Sea Cables"
- "Delilah"
- "A Departure"
- "The Derelict"
- "The Destroyers"
- "Dinah in Heaven"
- "The Disciple"
- "Divided Destinies"
- "Doctors"
- "The Dove of Dacca"
- "The Dutch in the Medway"
- "The Dying Chauffeur"
- "Eddi's Service"
- "Edgehill Fight"
- "The Egg-Shell"
- "En-Dor"
- "England's Answer"
- "The English Flag"
- "The 'eathen"
- "Evarra and His Gods"
- "The Expert"
- "The Explanation"
- "The Explorer"
- "The Fabulists"
- "The Fairies' Siege"
- "The Fall of Jock Gillespie"
- "Farewell and adieu..."
- "Fastness"
- "The Feet of the Young Men"
- "The Female of the Species"
- "The Fires"
- "The First Chantey"
- "The Flight"
- "The Floods"
- "The Flowers"
- "Follow Me 'ome"
- "For All We Have And Are"
- "Ford O'Kabul River"
- "For to Admire"
- "The Four Angels"
- "Four-Feet"
- "The Four Points"
- "Frankie's Trade"
- "The French Wars"
- "Fuzzy-Wuzzy"
- "The Galley-Slave"
- "Gallio's Song"
- "Gehazi"
- "General Joubert"
- "A General Summary"
- "Gentlemen-Rankers"
- "Gertrude's Prayer"
- "Gethsemane"
- "Giffen's Debt"
- "The Gift of Sea"
- "The Gipsy Trail"
- "Gipsy Vans"
- "The Glory of the Garden"
- "The Gods of the Copybook Headings"
- "The Grave of the Hundred Head"
- "Great-Heart"
- "The Greek National Anthem"
- "Gunga Din"
- "Half-Ballad of Waterval"
- "Harp Song of the Dane Women"
- "Helen All Alone"
- "Heriot's Ford"
- "The Heritage"
- "The Holy War"
- "The Hour of the Angel"
- "The Houses"
- "Hunting-Song of the Seeonee Pack"
- "Hyaenas"
- "Hymn Before Action"
- "Hymn to Physical Pain"
- "The Idiot Boy"
- "If—"
- "I Keep Six Honest..."
- "An Imperial Rescript"
- "In the Matter of One Compass"
- "In the Neolithic Age"
- "In Springtime"
- "The Instructor"
- "The Inventor"
- "The Irish Guards"
- "The Jacket"
- "James I"
- "Jane's Marriage"
- "The Jester"
- "Jubal and Tubal Cain"
- "The Juggler's Song"
- "The Jungle Books"
- "The Junk and the Dhow"
- "Justice"
- "The Justice's Tale"
- "Just So Stories"
- "Kim"
- "The King"
- "The Kingdom"
- "The King's Job"
- "The King's Task"
- "Kitchener's School"
- "The Ladies"
- "Lady Geraldine's Hardship"
- "The Lament of the Border Cattle Thief"
- "The Land"
- "The Landau"
- "The Last Chantey"
- "The Last Department"
- "The Last Lap"
- "The Last Ode"
- "The Last of the Light Brigade"
- "The Last Rhyme of True Thomas"
- "The Last Suttee"
- "Late Came the God"
- "The Law of the Jungle (From The Jungle Book)"
- "The Legend of Evil"
- "The Legend of the Foreign Office"
- "The Legend of Mirth"
- "A Legend of Truth"
- "L'envoi"
- "L'envoi to "Life's Handicap"
- "The Lesson"
- "Lichtenberg"
- "The Light That Failed"
- "The Liner She's a Lady"
- "The Long Trail"
- "Loot"
- "Lord Roberts"
- "The Lost Legion"
- "The Lovers' Litany"
- "The Love Song of Har Dyal"
- "The Lowestoft Boat"
- "Lukannon"
- "Macdonough's Song"
- "The Man Who Could Write"
- "Mandalay"
- "Many Inventions"
- "The Mare's Nest"
- "The Married Man"
- "The Mary Gloster"
- "Mary, Pity Women!"
- "Mary's Son"
- "The Masque of Plenty"
- "The Master-Cook"
- "M'Andrew's Hymn" (AKA "McAndrew's Hymn")
- "The Men That Fought at Minden"
- "The Merchantmen"
- "Merrow Down"
- "Mesopotamia"
- "Mine Sweepers"
- "The Miracles"
- "The Moon of Other Days"
- "The Moral"
- "Morning Song in the Jungle"
- "The Mother-Lodge"
- "Mother o' Mine"
- "The Mother's Son"
- "Mowgli's Song"
- "Mowgli's Song Against People"
- "Mulholland's Contract"
- "Municipal"
- "My Boy Jack"
- "My Father's Chair"
- "My Lady's Law"
- "My New-Cut Ashlar"
- "My Rival"
- "The Native Born"
- "A Nativity"
- "Natural Theology"
- "The Naulahka"
- "The Necessitarian"
- "Neighbours"
- "The New Nighthood"
- "Norman and Saxon"
- "The North Sea Patrol"
- "La Nuit Blanche"
- "The Nursing Sister"
- "The Old Issue"
- "Old Mother Laidinwool"
- "An Old Song"
- "The Oldest Song"
- "One Viceroy Resigns"
- "The Only Son"
- "Oonts"
- "Our Fathers Also"
- "Our Fathers of Old"
- "The Outlaws"
- "Outsong in the Jungle"
- "The Overland Mail"
- "A Pageant of Elizabeth"
- "Pagett, M.P."
- "The Palace"
- "Parade-Song of the Camp-Animals"
- "The Peace of Dives"
- "The Penalty"
- "Pharaoh and the Sergeant"
- "Philadelphia"
- "A Pict Song"
- "A Pilgrim's Way"
- "The Pink Dominoes"
- "The Pirates in England"
- "The Playmate"
- "The Plea of the Simla Dancers"
- "Poceidon's Law"
- "Poor Honest Men"
- "The Portant"
- "Possibilities"
- "The Post That Fitted"
- "The Power of the Dog"
- "The Prairie"
- "The Prayer"
- "The Prayer of Miriam Cohen"
- "Prelude"
- "A Preface"
- "The Press"
- "The Pro-Consuls"
- "The Prodigal Son"
- "The Progress of the Spark"
- "Prophets at Home"
- "Public Waste"
- "Puck's Song"
- "The Puzzler"
- "The Queen's Men"
- "The Question"
- "The Rabbi's Song"
- "Rebirth"
- "The Recall"
- "A Recantation"
- "Recessional"
- "Rector's Memory"
- "The Reeds of Runnymede"
- "The Reformers"
- "The Return"
- "The Return of the Children"
- "The Rhyme of the Three Captains"
- "The Rhyme of the Three Sealers"
- "Rimini"
- "Rimmon"
- "A Ripple Song"
- "The Ritual of the Calling of an Engineer"
- "The Rivers Tale"
- "Road-Song of the Bandar-Log"
- "The Roman Centurion's Song"
- "Romulus and Remus"
- "Route Marchin'"
- "The Rowers"
- "The Runes on the Weland's Sword"
- "The Run of Downs"
- "The Rupaiyat of Omar Kal'vin"
- "Russia to the Pacifists"
- "The Sacrifice of Er-Heb"
- "Sappers"
- "A School Song"
- "Screw-Guns"
- "The Sea And the Hills"
- "Seal Lullaby"
- "The Sea-Wife"
- "The Second Voyage"
- "The Secret of the Machines"
- "Sepulchral"
- "The Sergeant's Weddin'"
- "A Servant When He Reigneth"
- "Sestina of the Tramp-Royal"
- "Settler"
- "Seven Watchmen"
- "Shillin' a Day"
- "Sir Richard's Song"
- "A Smuggler's Song"
- "Snarleyow"
- "Soldier an' Sailor Too"
- "Soldier, Soldier"
- "The Song at Cock-Crow"
- "A Song in Storm"
- "The Song of the Banjo"
- "The Song of the Cities"
- "The Song of the Dead"
- "Song of Diego Valdez"
- "The Song of the English"
- "Song of the Fifth River"
- "Song of the Galley-Slaves"
- "A Song of Kabir"
- "The Song of the Little Hunter"
- "Song of the Men's Side"
- "The Song of the Old Guard"
- "Song of the Red War-Boat"
- "The Song of Seven Cities"
- "Song of Seventy Horses"
- "The Song of the Sons"
- "A Song of Travel"
- "A Song of the White Men"
- "Song of the Wise Children"
- "The Song of the Women"
- "The Songs of the Lathes"
- "The Sons of Martha"
- "South Africa"
- "The Spies' March"
- "A St. Helen Lullaby"
- "The Story of Ung"
- "The Story of Uriah"
- "The Stranger"
- "Study of Elevation, In Indian Ink"
- "The Survival"
- "Sussex"
- "A Tale of Two Cities"
- "Tarrant Moss"
- "Things and the Man"
- "Thorkild's Song"
- "The Thousandth Man"
- "A Three-Part Song"
- "The Threshold"
- "Tin Fish"
- "To the City of Bombay"
- "To the Companions"
- "Together"
- "To James Whitcomb Riley"
- "To a Lady, Persuading Her to a Car"
- "To Motorists"
- "To T. A."
- "The Totem"
- "To Thomas Atkins"
- "To the True Romance"
- "To the Unknown Goddess"
- "To Wolcott Balestier"
- "Tomlinson"
- "Tommy"
- "The Tour"
- "The Trade"
- "A Translation"
- "A Tree Song"
- "Troopin'"
- "The Truce of the Bear"
- "A Truthful Song"
- "Two Kopjes"
- "Two Months"
- "The Two-Sided Man"
- "Ulster"
- "The Undertaker's Horse"
- "Untimely"
- "The Vampire"
- "The Verdicts"
- "The Veterans"
- "The Vineyard"
- "The Virginity"
- "The Wage-Slaves"
- "The Way Through the Woods"
- "We and They"
- "The Wet Litany"
- "What Happened"
- "What the People Said"
- "When Earth's Last Picture Is Painted"
- "When the Great Ark"
- "When the Journey Was Intended To the City"
- "When 'Omer Smote..."
- "The Widower"
- "White Horses"
- "The White Man's Burden"
- "The Widow's Party"
- "The Widow at Windsor"
- "Wilful Missing"
- "The Winners"
- "The Wishing-Caps"
- "With Drake in the Tropics"
- "With Scindia to Delphi"
- "You Mustn't Swim..."
- "The Young British Soldier"
- "Zion"
