= Wee Willie Winkie (disambiguation) =

Wee Willie Winkie is a nursery rhyme. It may also refer to:

- Wee Willie Winkie and Other Child Stories, a collection of short stories by Rudyard Kipling
- Wee Willie Winkie (film), a 1937 film based on the Kipling story, starring Shirley Temple
- Wee Willie Winkie, the hero in a long-running Treasure (magazine) story series
- Wee Willie Winkie, also known as William Winkie, a character in Jasper Fforde's 2005 book The Big Over Easy
- "Wee Willie Winkie", a song numbered 13711 in the Roud Folk Song Index
- Wee Willie Winkie, a minor character in Salman Rushdie's novel Midnight's Children

== See also ==
- The Kin-der-Kids and Wee Willie Winkie's World, two early comic strips drawn by Lyonel Feininger
