= Boxwallah =

Boxwallah is a term with at least two vastly contrasting meanings: one denoting a street peddler in British India and the other denoting an elite corporate executive, chiefly in the city of Calcutta (now Kolkata), in early postcolonial India.

== Boxwallah as a street peddler ==
The Collins English Dictionary defines a boxwallah as a derogatory term referring to "an itinerant pedlar or salesman in India". In various 19th and early 20th century writings, the term was used in this sense. An edition of Hobson-Jobson from this period similarly defined a boxwallah as "a native itinerant peddler" who "sells cutlery, cheap nick-nacks, and small wares of all kinds, chiefly European", as did another dictionary of slang. The word was a combination of "box" and "wallah". According to author Ronald Vivian Smith, such boxwallahs started disappearing from the late 1940s onwards.

== Boxwallah as an elite corporate executive ==
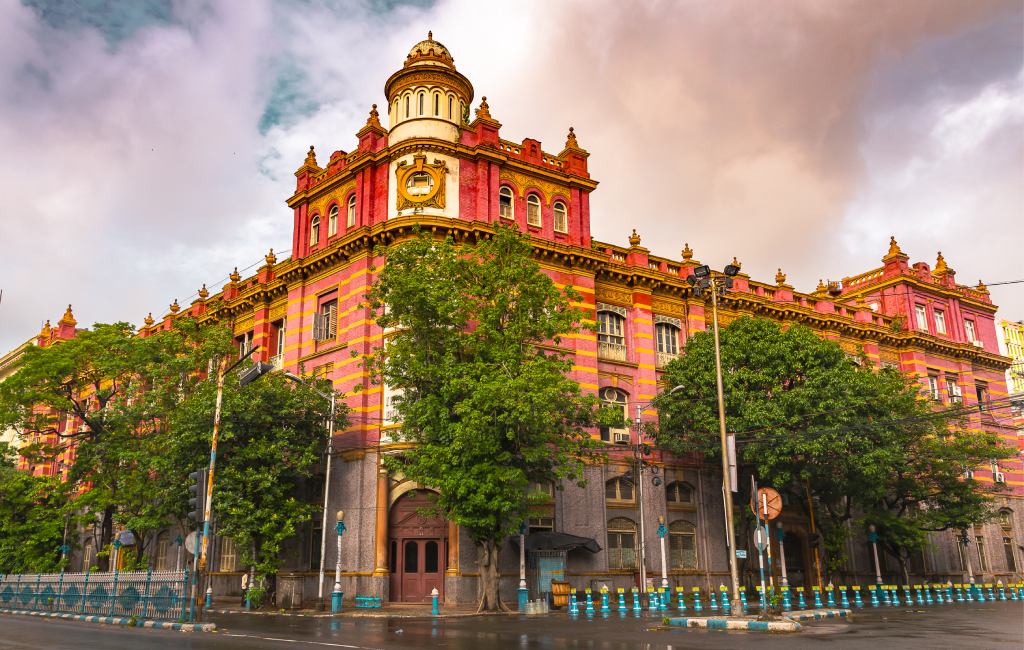
In postcolonial India, V. S. Naipaul vividly described the "box-wallah culture of Calcutta". Naipaul's imagery cited the Dalhousie business district (pictured) and British companies like Imperial Tobacco and Metal Box.

The term boxwallah assumed a vastly different meaning in postcolonial India. The term became associated with anglicised Indian professionals working in elite British mercantile firms in Calcutta. Notably, V. S. Naipaul described boxwallahs as a "select and envied group" and part of "the new Indian elite", and observed: "The box-wallah culture of Calcutta is of a peculiar richness... This culture, though of Calcutta, is not necessarily Bengali. ...No one who works for the Marwaris can therefore properly be considered a box-wallah—your true box-wallah works only for the best British firms." Naipaul further observed: "The Calcutta box-wallah comes of a good family, ICS, Army or big business; he might even have princely connections. He has been educated at an Indian or English public school and at one of the two English universities, whose accent, through all the encircling hazards of Indian intonation, he rigidly maintains." Naipaul mentioned film personality Chidananda Dasgupta, who had worked with Imperial Tobacco in Calcutta, as someone who was a boxwallah. Similarly, the autobiography of Raj Chatterjee, also a former executive at Imperial Tobacco in Calcutta, is titled The Boxwallah and the Middleman. Similarly, corporate executive R. Gopalakrishnan has used the expression while referring to old British companies in Calcutta, such as Andrew Yule, Balmer Lawrie and Martin Burn: "names that have now virtually vanished." Other authors to use the term boxwallah in the second sense include Amit Chaudhuri and Pavan Verma. However, even though referring to elite corporate professionals, the use of the term boxwallah was still considered somewhat derogatory, owing to its original colonial association with street peddlers.

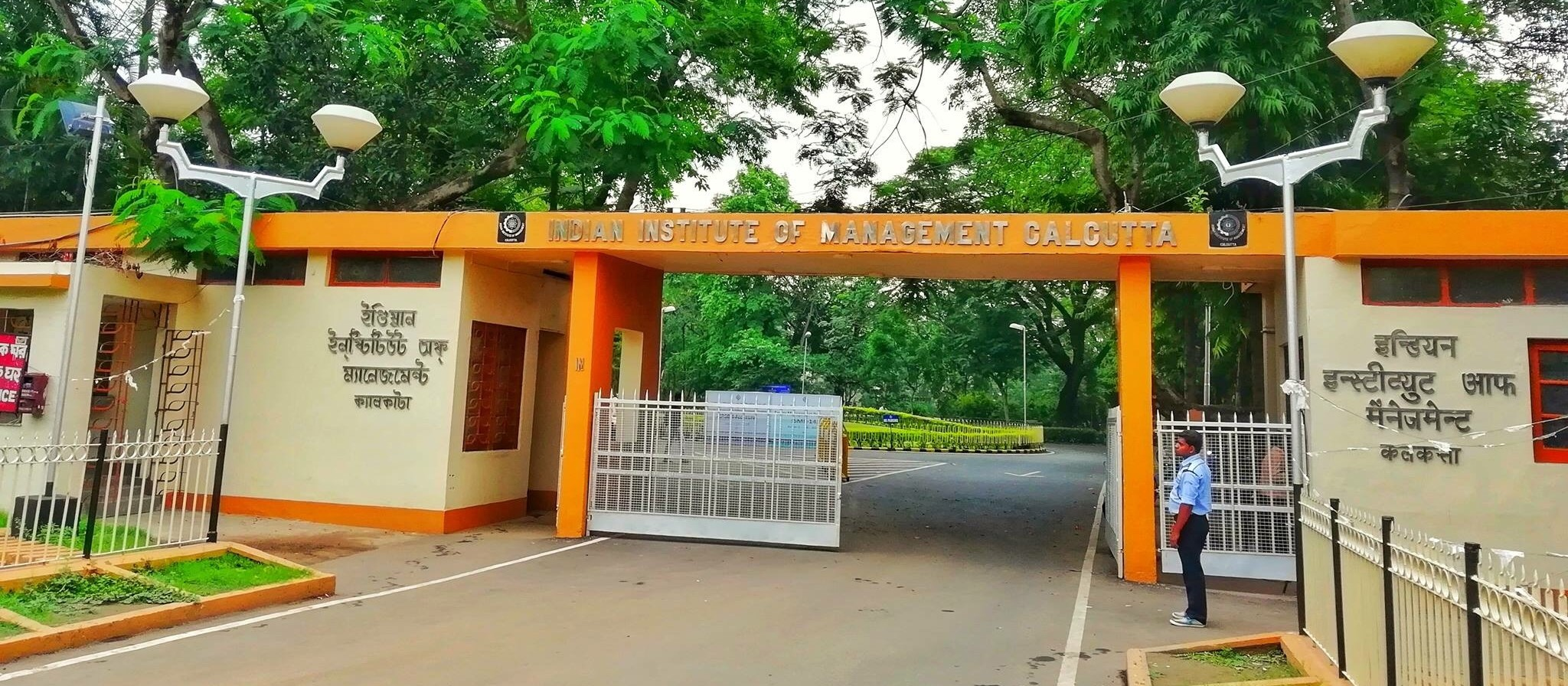
The advent of the Indian Institutes of Management are thought to have led to elite boxwallah executives from liberal arts backgrounds becoming redundant.

With the liberalisation of the Indian economy, the term "boxwallah" has become less common with changes in management culture. In the 1980s, Arabinda Ray, then executive director of General Electric in India spoke of the need for industry to "transition from the image of a 'boxwallah'... to the modern professional manager", advocating the hiring of talent from the Indian Institutes of Management and the Indian Institutes of Technology. Chatterjee, in a chapter his autobiography titled "Requiem for a Boxwallah" describes how executives like him were eventually succeeded by "Brash young men with degrees in business administration who thought that our ideas were outdated, our pace too slow." Anup Sinha, former professor at the Indian Institute of Management Calcutta, has explained the shift as follows: "The British colonial model of running businesses was on the way out as were the companies themselves. The age of the box-wallah' was over and the managerial characteristics of having a liberal arts education with a good family background and communication skills became redundant. There was a shift of focus in managerial skills towards production and operations and away from sales and marketing. The old British model was found wanting, and India turned to the US model with its emphasis on technical competence and rigorous training in the science of management."

== Boxwallah English ==
In 1845, an article in The New Monthly Magazine and Humorist referred to the grammatically incorrect dialect of English spoken by boxwallahs (peddlers) in Calcutta. The article stated: "Every one of these superlative pedlars declares he is 'mem's own boxwallah', and each protests that he 'money not want – mem say her own price'." In 1891, the linguist Hugo Schuchardt identified Boxwallah English as one of five types of pidgin English spoken in India, association the dialect with street peddlers in "Upper India". In postcolonial India, Braj Bihari Kachru similarly identified Boxwallah English as a distinct form of English. Some examples of expressions in Boxwallah English given by Kachru are "I come go", "This good, fresh ten rupee", "He thief me" and "price good".

In contrast, certain elite English accents appear to have been equated with that spoken by elite postcolonial boxwallahs. For example, Stephen Fry has described the film director Robin Hardy as possessing "a rather box-wallah version of an upper-class accent." In his novel "A Fine Family", Gurcharan Das has said of a character: "A. N. Rao, Neena's father, was a boxwallah, and one of the first Indian directors of a British company based in Bombay. He sported an ascot and a tweed jacket; he was the sort of person who spoke Hindustani with an Oxford accent."

== Boxwallah in literature ==
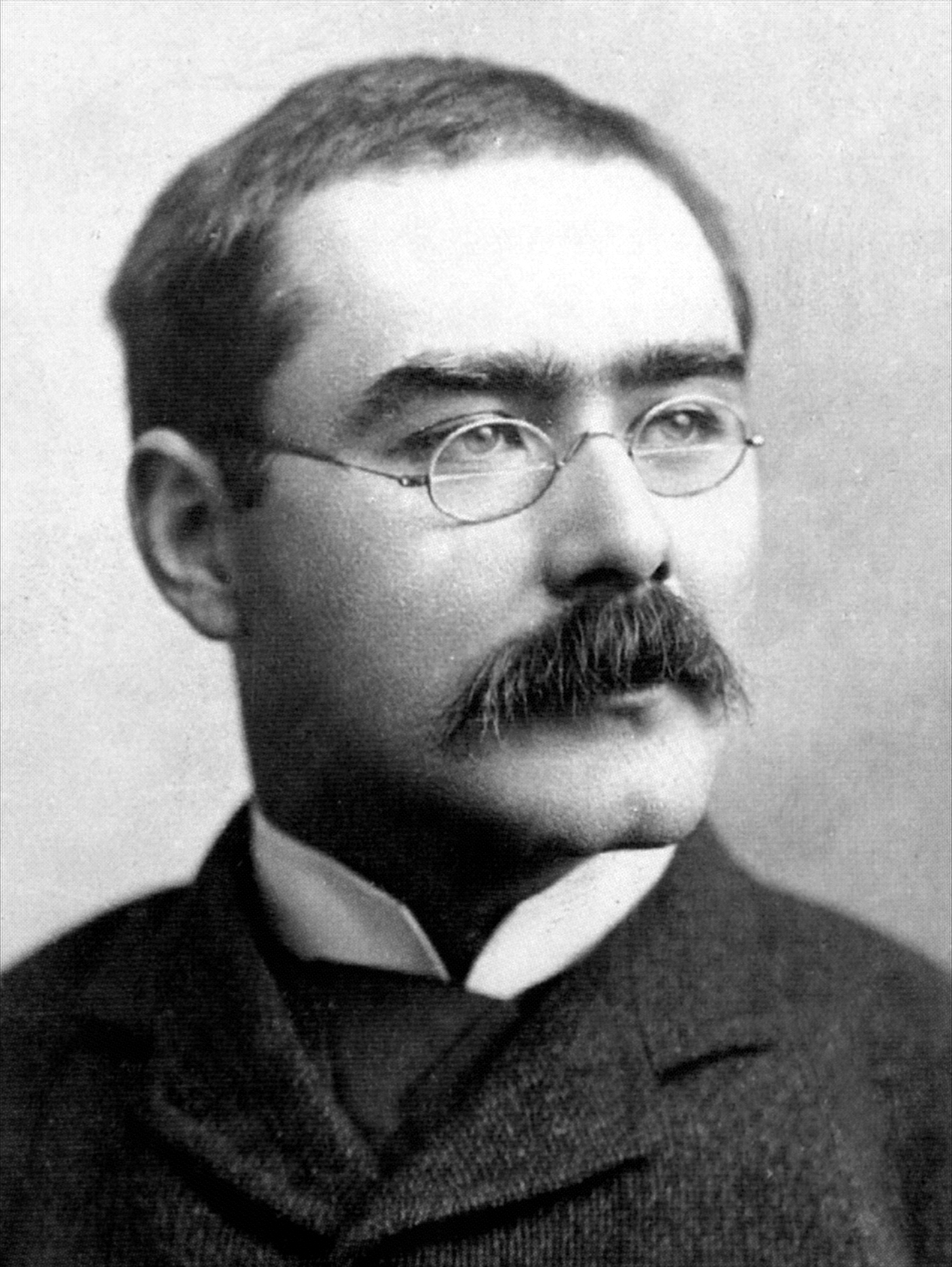
Rudyard Kipling

Rudyard Kipling was particularly attracted by the idea of a boxwallah and the idea of a boxwallah is present in several of his short stories. In "From Sea to Sea", Kipling talks of a mistreated Burmese girl as if she were a Delhi Boxwallah, presumably because the protagonist bargained too hard with her. In "The Sending of Dana Da", the title character makes a deathbed reference to his former life as a boxwallah. Evelyn Waugh also mentions a 'wallah' at the end of his short story, "Incident in Azania." Within the short essay "A Hanging" George Orwell describes the execution of a prisoner. Afterwards one of the prison workers mentions a cigarette case he claims to have purchased from a boxwallah.

== Boxwallah in cinema ==
Satyajit Ray's film Seemabaddha ("Company limited") is regarded as a portrayal of a boxwallah in the elite, postcolonial sense of the term, i.e. a westernised corporate executive in Calcutta. The protagonist in the film (played by Barun Chanda) works with a fictitious British fan manufacturing company called Hindusthan Peters. Ray himself described the film as "a definitive film about the boxwallahs".

In Anik Dutta's 2019 film Bhobishyoter Bhoot, one of the characters in the film (also played by Chanda) is a corporate executive from early postcolonial Calcutta, referred to as a boxwallah in the film.

The Boxwallah is also the title of an ITV Playhouse TV film that aired on 31 July 1982 and starred Leo McKern and Rachel Kempson.
