= Late Came the God =

1926 poem by Rudyard Kipling

- by Rudyard Kipling
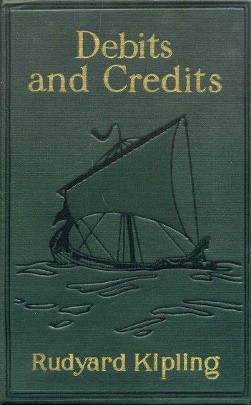
- First published in: Debits and Credits
- Publication date: 1926

"Late Came the God" is a poem by Indian-born English writer Rudyard Kipling, published in 1926 as the opening to the short story The Wish House in Debits and Credits.

== Background ==
The poem is comparable to the story that follows it. In The Wish House, the protagonist Grace Ashcroft had badly treated a number of men who loved her more than she loved them. She falls in love with a Harry Mockler who leaves her; she subsequently takes his poor health and suffering to bear upon herself, for the sake of love, doing so with resoluteness and without regret.

== Poem ==
Late came the God, having sent his forerunners who were not regarded–
Late, but in wrath; Saying: "The wrong shall be paid, the contempt be rewarded
On all that she hath." He poisoned the blade and struck home, the full bosom receiving
The wound and the venom in one, past cure or relieving.

He made treaty with Time to stand still that the grief might be fresh-
Daily renewed and nightly pursued through her soul to her flesh-
Mornings of memory, noontides of agony, midnights unslaked for her,
Till the stones of the streets of her Hells and her Paradise ached for her.

So she lived while her body corrupted upon her.
And she called on the Night for a sign, and a Sign was allowed,
And she builded an Altar and served by the light of her Vision-
Alone, without hope of regard or reward, but uncowed,
Resolute, selfless, divine. These things she did in Love's honour...
What is a God beside Woman? Dust and derision!

== Critical reception ==
Historian Philip Mason calls the poem "as dense and driven a poem as anything in Donne or Hopkins – and better crafted." Mason singles out the ending: "These things she did in Love's honour . . . What is a God beside Woman? Dust and derision!" He praises the poem and the story to which it is attached:

The outstanding question about Kipling to my mind – and here unasked – is how a man who could publish in his last years so trivial a story as, for instance, "The Tie" [Limits and Renewals] could also rise to such heights. "The Tie" I can only call silly and vulgar. Contrast it with, let us say, "The Wish House" [Debits and Credits], and the poem that goes with it, "Late Came the God".

Mason suggests that the god referred to in the poem "is the pagan god who punishes hubris, the excessive pride shown in treatment of previous lovers." Author William B. Dillingham suggests it might be "Fate or Destiny".

In the Kipling Journal, Gee Kim noted the poem's themes of "wasted life and physical pain" also seen in other works of Kipling. She discusses its religious inklings:

It has a serious, biblical tone, like many of Kipling's poems; for instance in the phrase 'she builded an Altar'; 'builded' rather than 'built' could give a mocking sense to the words, similar to its use in "The Conundrum of Workshops", – 'They builded a tower to shiver the sky' – where the hard work of man is derided by the Devil. But Kipling could also be showing admiration through the religious language; suggesting her nobility and grace (Grace is also coincidentally the first name of Mrs Ashcroft).
