= The Man Who Would Be King =

1888 short story by Rudyard Kipling

- Short story by Rudyard Kipling
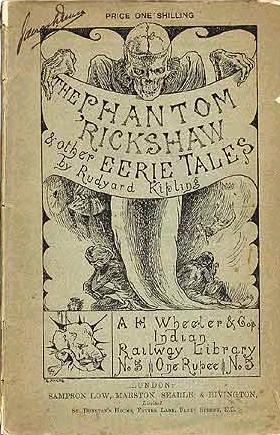

Text available at Wikisource
- Country: United Kingdom, British India
- Language: English
- Genres: Adventure, lost world

Publication
- Published in: The Phantom 'Rickshaw and other Eerie Tales
- Publication type: Anthology
- Publisher: A. H. Wheeler & Co. of Allahabad
- Publication date: 1888

"The Man Who Would Be King" is an 1888 short story by Rudyard Kipling about two British adventurers in British India who become kings of Kafiristan, a remote part of Afghanistan. The story was first published in The Phantom 'Rickshaw and Other Tales (1888); it also appeared in Wee Willie Winkie and Other Child Stories (1895) and numerous later editions of that collection. It has been adapted for other media a number of times.

== Plot summary ==
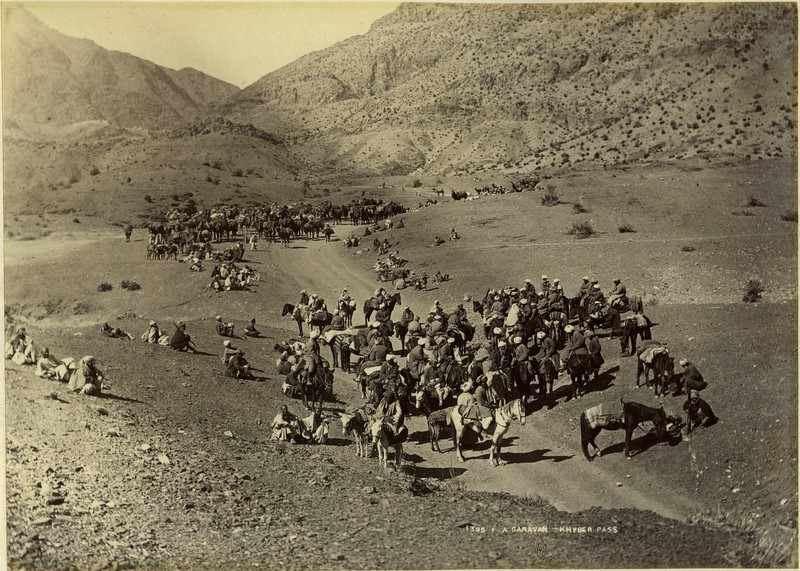
A caravan in the Khyber Pass c. 1880s

The narrator of the story is a Victorian journalist, correspondent of Backwoodsman in India during the British Raj: Kipling himself, in all but name. Whilst on a tour of some Indian native states, in 1886, he meets two scruffy adventurers, Daniel Dravot and Peachey Taliaferro Carnehan. Softened by their stories, he agrees to help them in a small errand, but later he regrets this and informs the authorities about them, which prevents them from blackmailing a minor rajah. A few months later, the pair appear at the narrator's newspaper office in Lahore, where they tell him of a plan they have hatched. They declare that, after years of trying their hands at all manner of things, they have decided that India is not big enough for them, so they intend to go to Kafiristan and set themselves up as kings. Dravot, disguised as a priest, and Carnehan, as his servant, will go to the unexplored region armed with twenty Martini-Henry rifles and their British military knowledge. Once there, they plan to find a king or chief and help him defeat his enemies before taking over for themselves. They ask the narrator to see books, encyclopedias, and maps about the area as a favour, both because they are fellow Freemasons and because he spoiled their blackmail scheme. In an attempt to prove that they are not crazy, they show the narrator a contract they have drawn up between themselves, which swears loyalty between the pair and total abstinence from women and alcohol until they are kings.

Two years later, on a scorching hot summer night, Carnehan creeps into the narrator's office. He is a broken man, a crippled beggar clad in rags who has trouble staying focused, but he tells an amazing story: he says he and Dravot succeeded in becoming kings. They traversed treacherous mountains, found the Kafirs, mustered an army, and took over villages, all the while dreaming of building a unified nation or even an empire. The Kafirs were impressed by the rifles and Dravot's lack of fear of their pagan idols, and they soon began to acclaim him as a god and descendant of Alexander the Great; they exhibited a whiter complexion than the natives of the surrounding areas ("so hairy and white and fair it was just shaking hands with old friends"), implying an ancient lineage going back to Alexander and some of his troops themselves. Dravot and Carnehan were shocked to discover that the Kafirs practiced a form of Masonic ritual, and their reputations were cemented when they showed knowledge of Masonic secrets beyond those known by even the highest of the Kafir priests and chiefs.

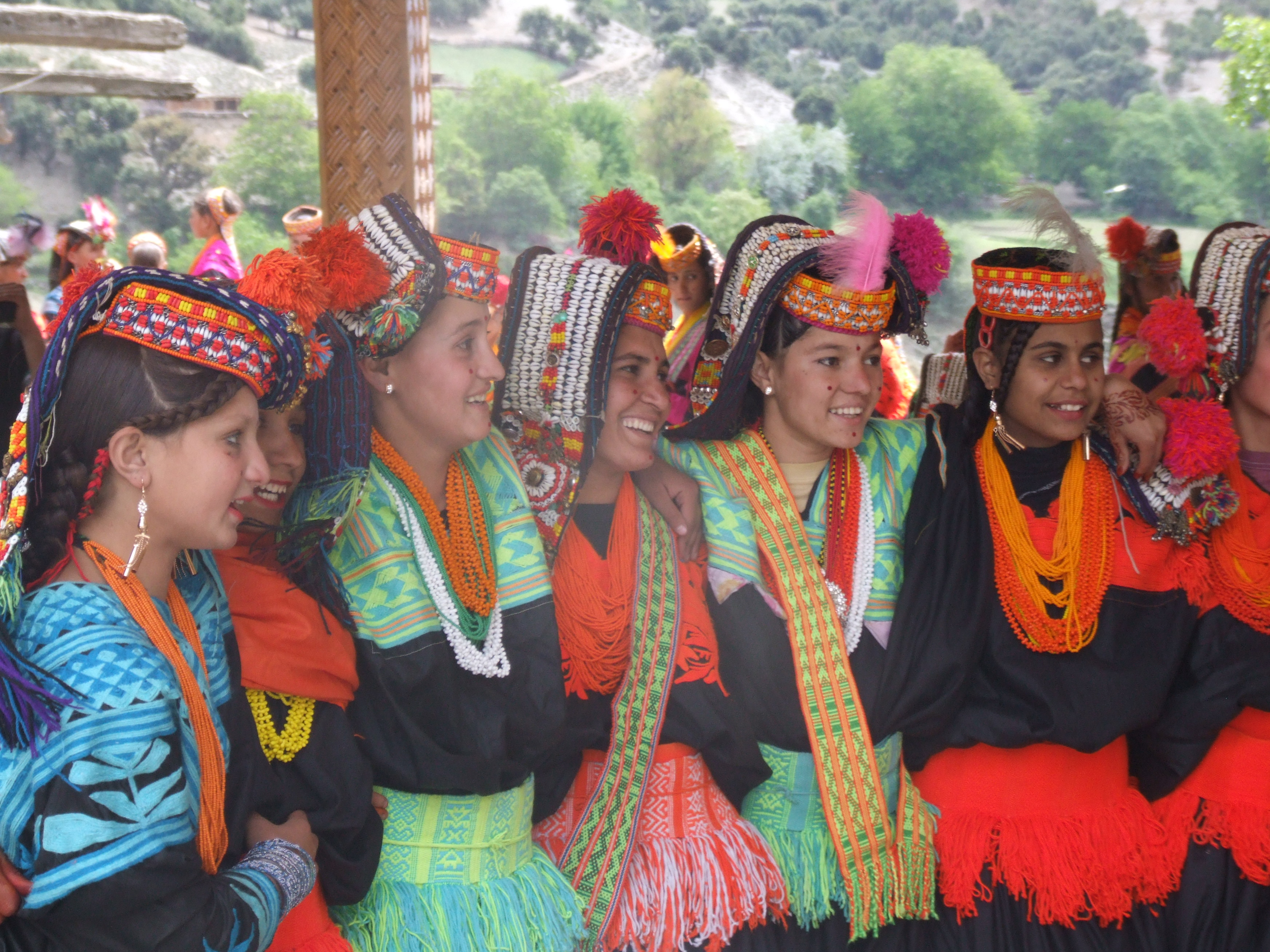
A Kalash festival

The schemes of Dravot and Carnehan were dashed, however, when Dravot, against the advice of Carnehan, decided it was time to marry a Kafir girl — kingship going to his head, he decided he needed a queen to give him a royal son. Terrified by the idea of marrying a god, the girl bit Dravot when he tried to kiss her during the wedding ceremony. Seeing him bleed, the priests cried that he was "Neither God nor Devil but a man!" and most of the Kafirs turned against Dravot and Carnehan. A few of their men remained loyal, but the army defected and the two kings were captured. Dravot, wearing his crown, stood on a rope bridge over a gorge while the Kafirs cut the ropes, and he fell to his death. Carnehan was crucified between two pine trees, but, when he survived this torture for a whole day, the Kafirs considered it a miracle and let him go. He then slowly begged his way back to India over the course of a year.

As proof of his tale, Carnehan shows the narrator Dravot's severed head and golden crown before he leaves, taking the head and crown, which he swears never to sell, with him. The following day, the narrator sees Carnehan crawling along the road in the noon sun with his hat off. He has gone mad, so the narrator sends him to the local asylum. When he inquires two days later, he learns that Carnehan has died of sunstroke. No belongings were found with him.

== Acknowledged sources ==
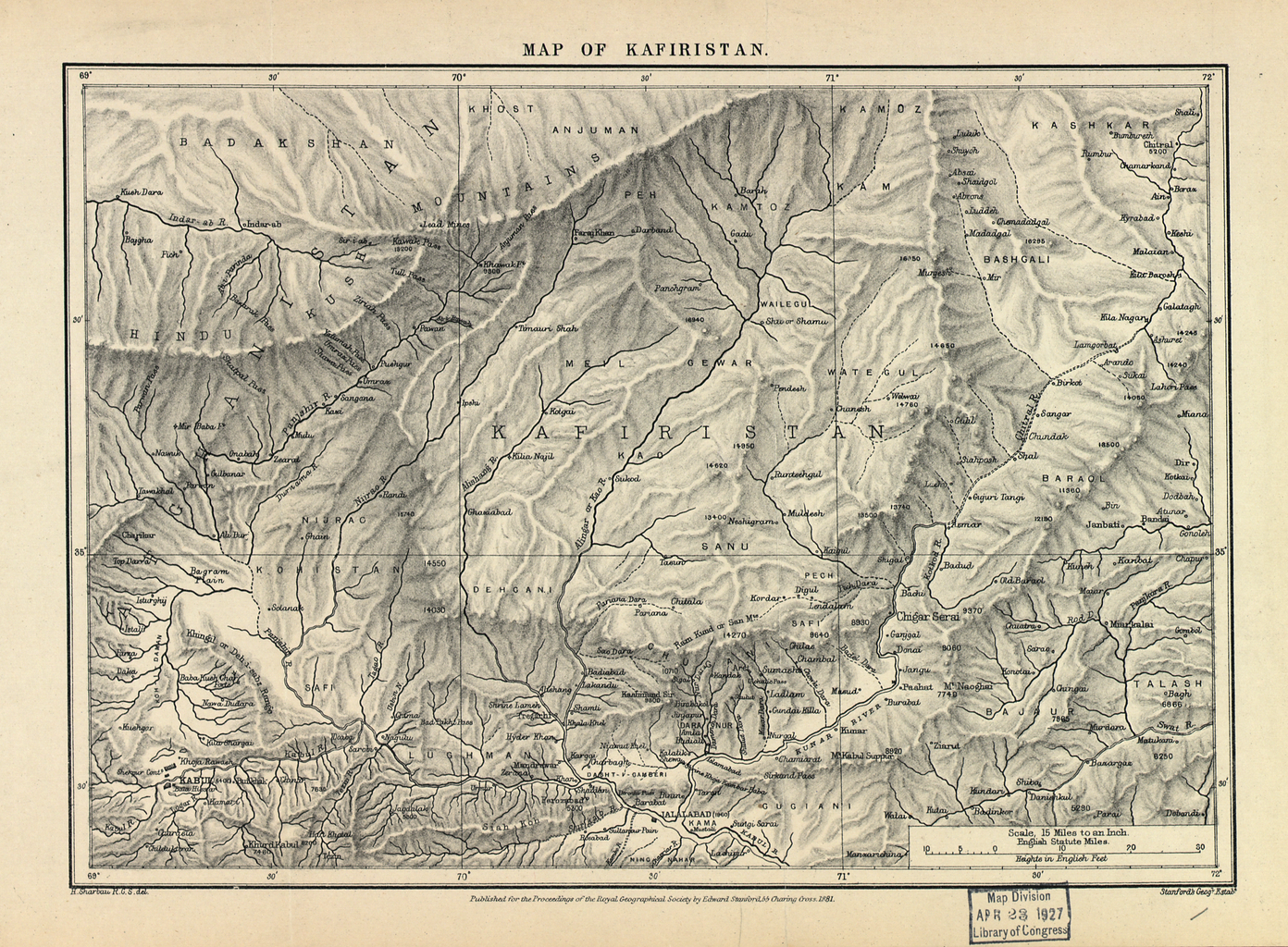
Map of Kafiristan 1881

Kafiristan was recognised as a real place by at least one early Kipling scholar, Arley Munson, who in 1915 called it "a small tract of land in the northeastern part of Afghanistan", though she wrongly thought the "only source of information is the account of the Mahomedan traders who have entered the country." By then, Kafiristan had been literally wiped off the map and renamed "Nuristan" in Amir Abdur Rahman Khan's 1895 conquest, and it was soon forgotten by literary critics who, under the sway of the New Criticism, read the story as an allegory of the British Raj. The disappearance of Kafiristan was so complete that a 1995 New York Times article referred to it as "the mythical, remote kingdom at the center of the Kipling story."

As the New Historicism replaced the New Criticism, scholars rediscovered the story's historical Kafiristan, aided by the trail of sources left in it by Kipling himself, in the form of the publications the narrator supplies to Dravot and Carnehan:

- "Volume INF-KAN of the Encyclopædia Britannica", which, in the ninth edition of 1882, contained Sir Henry Yule's long "Kafiristan" entry. Yule's entry described Kafiristan as "land of lofty mountains, dizzy paths, and hair-rope bridges swinging over torrents, of narrow valleys laboriously terraced, but of wine, milk, and honey rather than of agriculture." He includes Bellew's description of a Kafir informant as "hardly to be distinguished from an Englishman" and comments at length on the reputed beauty of Kafir women.
- "Wood on the Sources of the Oxus", namely, A Personal Narrative of a Journey to the Source of the River Oxus by the Route of the Indus, Kabul, and Badakhshan (1841) by Captain John Wood (1811–1871), from which Dravot extracts route information.
- "The file of the United Services' Institute", accompanied by the directive, "read what Bellew says," refers, no doubt, to an 1879 lecture on "Kafristan [sic] and the Kafirs" by Surgeon Major Henry Walter Bellew (1834–1892). This account, like Wood's, was based largely on second-hand native travellers' accounts and "some brief notices of this people and country scattered about in the works of different native historians," for, as he noted, "up to the present time we have no account of this country and its inhabitants by any European traveler who has himself visited them." The 29-page survey of history, manners and customs, was as "sketchy and inaccurate" as the narrator suggests, Bellew acknowledging that "of the religion of the Kafirs we know very little", but noting that "the Kafir women have a world wide reputation of being very beautiful creatures."
- The narrator smokes "while the men pored over Raverty, Wood, the maps, and the Encyclopædia." Henry George Raverty's "Notes on Káfiristan" appeared in the Journal of the Asiatic Society of Bengal in 1859, and it is presumably this work, based on Raverty's contact with some Siah-Posh Kafirs, that is being referenced.

== Possible models ==
In addition to Kipling's acknowledged sources, a number of individuals have been proposed as possible models for the story's main characters.

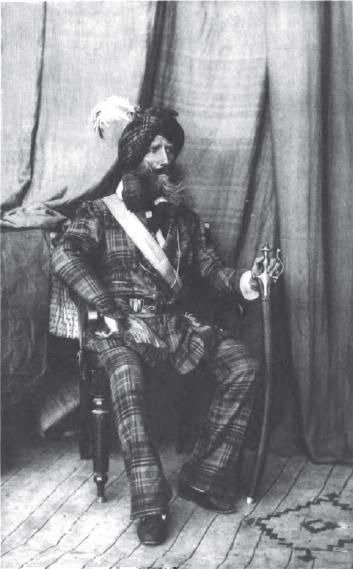
Gardner

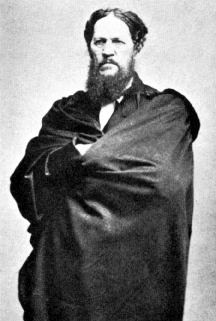
Harlan

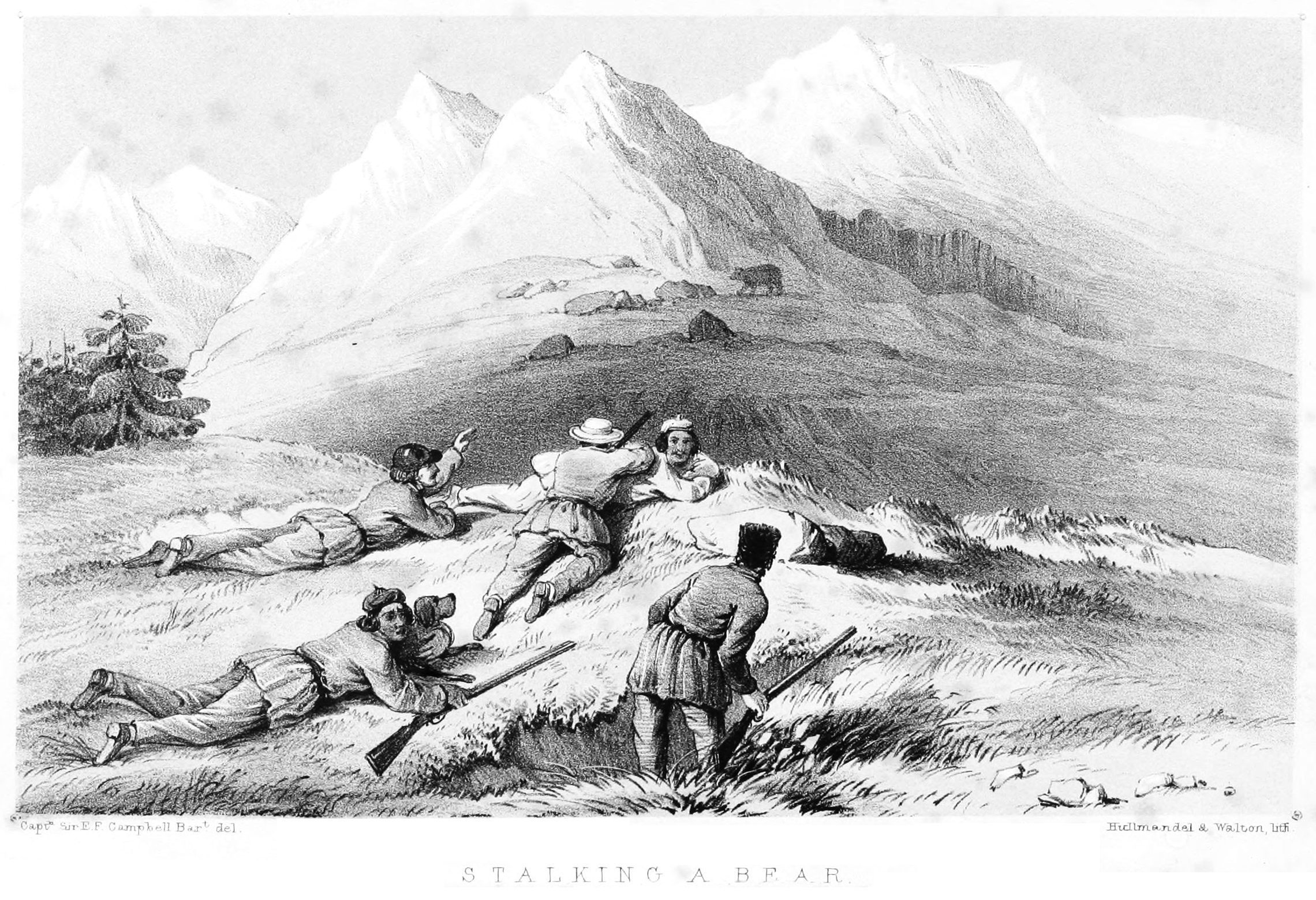
Frederick Wilson (at left in black cap)

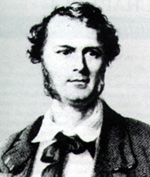
Brooke

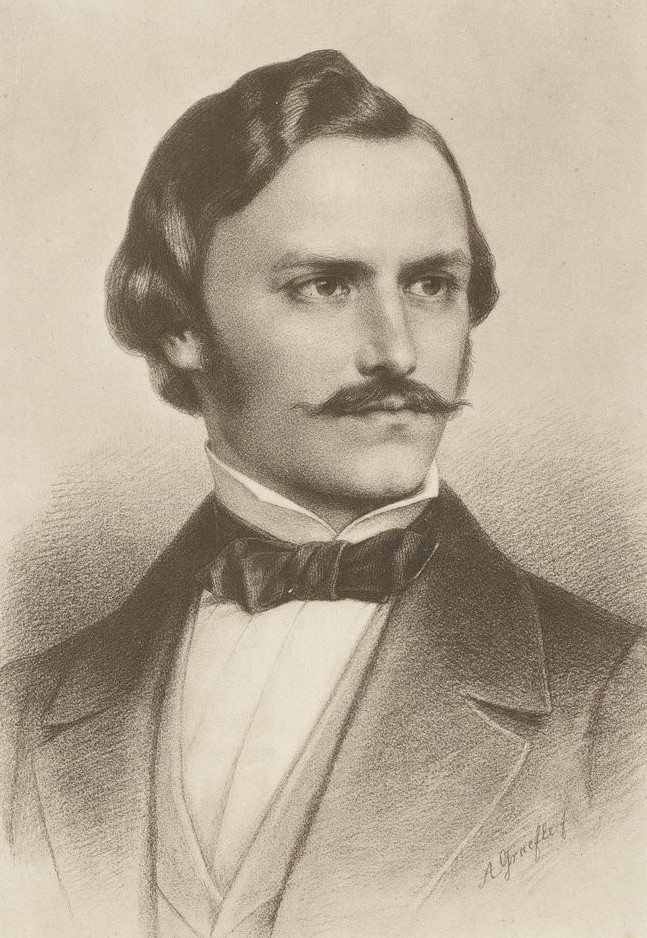
Schlagintweit

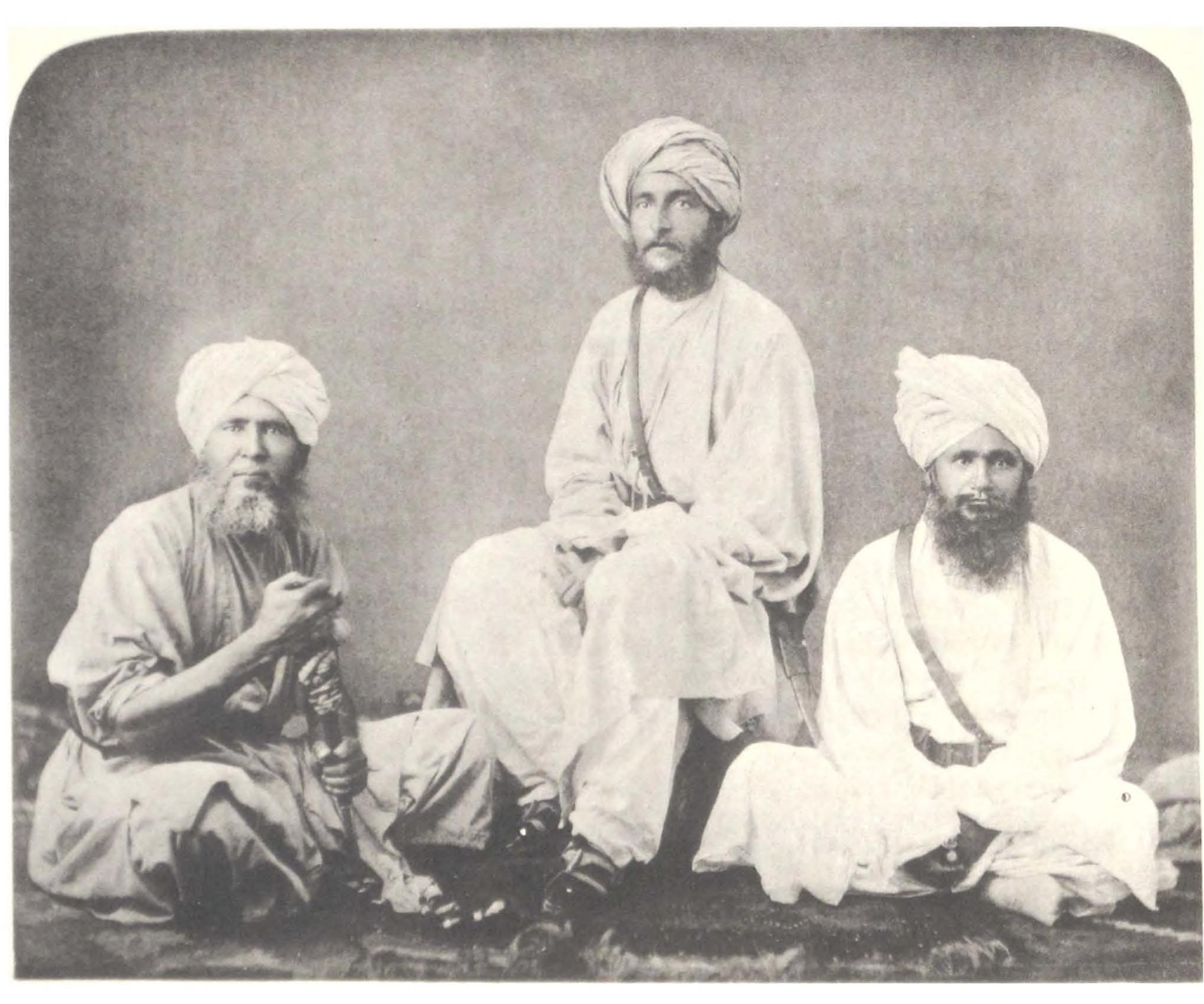
McNair
- Alexander Gardner (1785–1877), American adventurer captured in Afghanistan in 1823. Gardner "stated that he visited Kafiristan twice between 1826 and 1828, and his veracity was vouched for by … reliable authorities" "Only Gardner provides the three essential ingredients of the Kipling novel," according to John Keay.
- Josiah Harlan (1799–1871), American adventurer enlisted as a surgeon with the British East India Company's army in 1824.
- Frederick "Pahari" Wilson (1817–1883), a British officer who deserted during the First Afghan War and later became "Raja of Harsil." Mrs. Admonia Hil a friend of Kipling's states that the first draft of the story was written in Allahabad soon after Kipling returned from Mussoorie in 1888. In Mussoorie, Kipling stayed at the Charlesville Hotel where the stories of Wilson and his son were likely still discussed. Especially, with an English Jornalist.
- James Brooke, a Briton who in 1841 was made the first White Rajah of Sarawak in Borneo, in gratitude for military assistance to the Sultan of Brunei. Kipling alludes to Brooke twice in the story: when Dravot refers to Kafiristan as the "only one place now in the world that two strong men can Sar-a-whack" and when Dravot says "Rajah Brooke will be a suckling to us."
- Adolf Schlagintweit (1829–1857) German botanist and explorer of Central Asia. Suspected of being a Chinese spy, he was beheaded in Kashgar by the amir, Wali Khan. A Persian traveler subsequently delivered his supposed head to colonial administrators, much as Carnehan had brought Dravot's head to the narrator of the story.
- William Watts McNair (1849–1889), a surveyor in the Indian Survey Department who, in 1883, visited Kafiristan while on furlough disguised as a hakim or native doctor, disregarding Government regulations. His report to the Royal Geographical Society earned him the Murchison Award.

== Reception ==
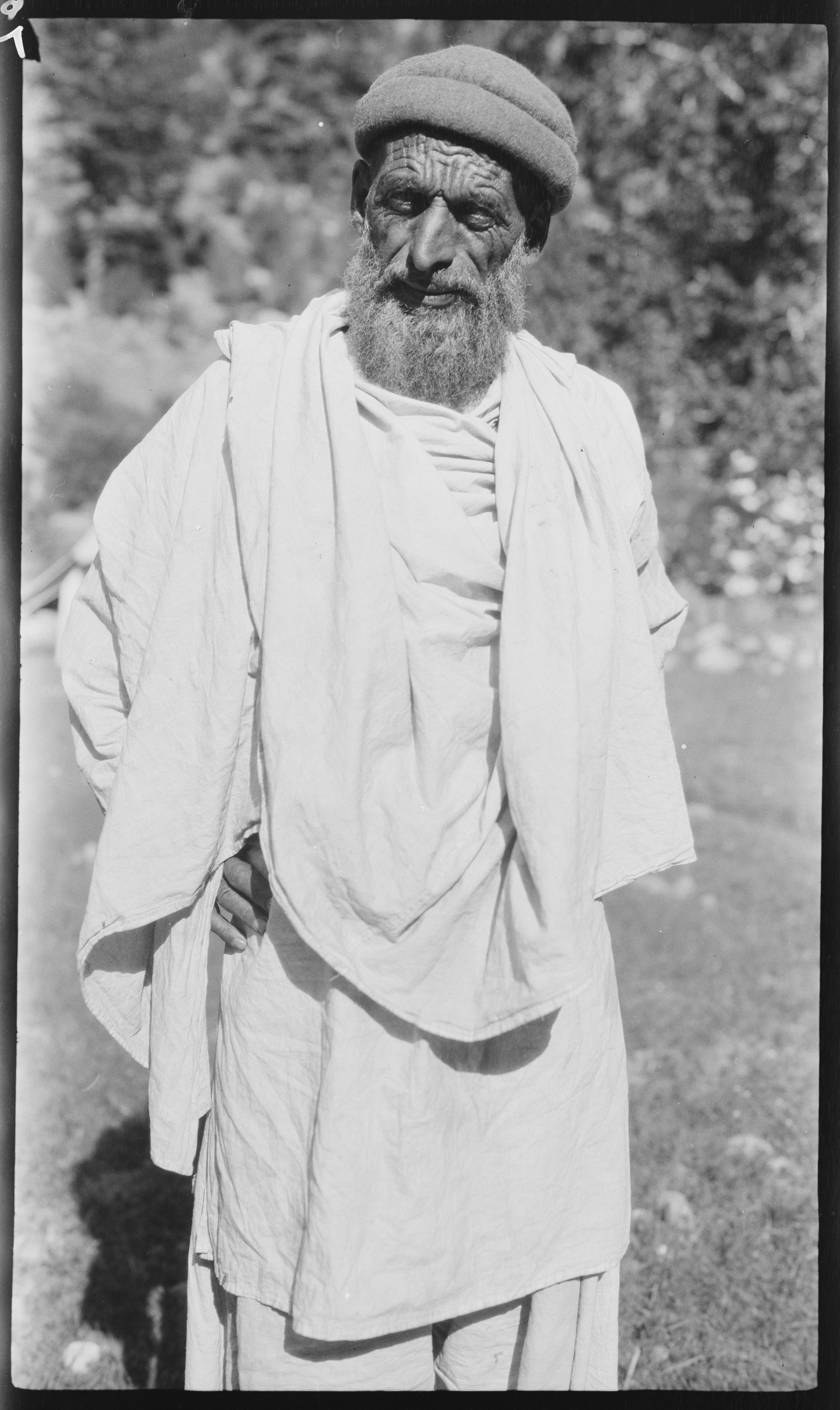
Abdal Kadir, last malik of the Red Kafirs of Kunisht

- As a young man, the would-be poet T. S. Eliot, already an ardent admirer of Kipling, wrote a short story called "The Man Who Was King". Published in 1905 in the Smith Academy Record, a magazine of the school he was attending as a day-boy, the story explicitly shows how the prospective poet was concerned with his own unique version of the "King".
- J. M. Barrie described the story as "the most audacious thing in fiction".
- Kingsley Amis called the story a "grossly overrated long tale" in which a "silly prank ends in predictable and thoroughly deserved disaster."
- Additional critical responses are collected in Harold Bloom's Rudyard Kipling.

== Adaptations and cultural references ==
=== Literature ===
- In H. G. Wells' When the Sleeper Wakes/The Sleeper Awakes (1899, revised 1910), the Sleeper identifies a cylinder ("a modern substitute for books") with "The Man Who Would Be King" written on the side in mutilated English as "oi Man huwdbi Kin". The Sleeper recalls the story as "one of the best stories in the world".
- In the Anno Dracula series of novels by Kim Newman, Danny Dravot appears as a vampire agent of the Diogenes Club in the first three entries: Anno Dracula (1992), The Bloody Red Baron (1995), and Dracula Cha Cha Cha (1998).
- The two main characters appear in Ian Edginton's graphic novel Scarlet Traces (2002).
- The non-fiction work The Man Who Would Be Queen by J. Michael Bailey takes its title, but nothing else, from Kipling's story.
- The 1975 film version figures in the plot of Jimmy Buffett's book A Salty Piece of Land (2004).
- Harry Turtledove's fantasy novel Every Inch a King (2005) has two protagonists who are similar to Dravot and Carnehan. The novel is ostensibly based on the ramblings of German acrobat Otto Witte in the 1920s, which may have been in turn inspired by Kipling's story.
- Garth Nix's short story "Losing Her Divinity", in the book Rags & Bones (2013), is based on the story.
- A French Bande dessinée version by Jean-Christophe Derrien and Remi Torregrossa was published by Glénat Editions in 2023 as L'Homme qui voulut etre roi.

=== Radio ===
- A CBS Radio adaption of the story by Les Crutchfield was broadcast on the anthology series Escape on 7 July 1947. It was rebroadcast on 1 August 1948.
- An adaptation by Mike Walker was broadcast on BBC Radio 4 on 22 July 2018 as part of the To The Ends of the Earth series.

=== Films ===
- The Man Who Would Be King (1975), adapted and directed by John Huston and starring Sean Connery as Dravot and Michael Caine as Carnehan, with Christopher Plummer as Kipling. (As early as 1954, Humphrey Bogart expressed the desire to star in The Man Who Would Be King and was in talks with Huston.)
- The DreamWorks 2D hand-drawn animated movie The Road to El Dorado (2000) is loosely based on the story.
- The horror comedy film Shaun of the Dead (2004) has a DVD special feature called "The Man Who Would Be Shaun," showing Simon Pegg and Nick Frost doing impressions of the duo from the 1975 film.
- The 2019 children's adventure The Kid Who Would Be King is an urban fantasy involving King Arthur, with no resemblance to Kipling's story beyond the title.

=== Television ===
- Numerous shows have episodes titles formatted as "The Man Who Would Be..." or "The ... Who Would Be King (or Queen)", often with tenuous relation to Kipling's story. E.g., "The Smurf Who Would Be King" or "The Gorg Who Would Be King".
- DuckTales (1987-1990) had occasional references to Kipling's story. The first-season episode "Launchpad's First Crash" has a brief allusion to the story (although the episode plot also contains elements of Edgar Rice Burroughs' Pellucidar and Charlotte Perkins Gilman's Herland). More on point, the second chapter of the 1989 serial "Time is Money" is entitled "The Duck Who Would Be King" (with Bubba Duck being the relevant character), but bears a tenuous resemblance to Kipling's story.
- The 2014 British miniseries Fleming: The Man Who Would Be Bond is a biography of Ian Fleming, author of James Bond. Although peripheral, James Bond was played in films by Sean Connery, who also starred in the 1975 film of Kipling's story.

=== Games ===
- Gold and Glory: The Road to El Dorado (2000) (the video game tie-in to The Road to El Dorado) was developed by Revolution Software and released on PlayStation, Game Boy Color, and Microsoft Windows.

=== Music ===
- The Libertines have a song called "The Man Who Would Be King" on their self-titled second album (2004). It reflects on the story, as two friends—who seem to be at the top—drift away from each other and begin to despise each other, mirroring the bandmates' turbulent relationship and eventual splitting of the band shortly after the album's release. Songwriters Pete Doherty and Carl Barât are known fans of Kipling and his work.
- The third song on Billy Woods’ album History Will Absolve Me (2012) takes its title from Kipling’s story. Woods uses Kipling as a colonial intertext in the song, whose speaker narrates the various imperial exploits of Europe (specifically England) in Africa.
