= The Phantom 'Rickshaw and Other Tales =

Collection of short stories by Rudyard Kipling, first published in 1888

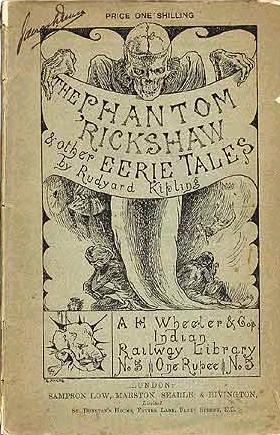
- Cover of the 1888 edition
- Author: Rudyard Kipling
- Language: English
- Series: Indian Railway Library
- Publisher: A H Wheeler & Co
- Publication date: 1888
- Publication place: British India
- Media type: Print (Hardback & Paperback)

The Phantom 'Rickshaw and Other Tales, also known as The Phantom 'Rickshaw & other Eerie Tales, is a collection of short stories by Rudyard Kipling, first published in 1888.

== The Phantom 'Rickshaw (horror story) ==
After an affair with a Mrs. Agnes Keith-Wessington in Simla, the narrator, Jack, repudiates her and eventually becomes engaged to Miss Kitty Mannering. Yet Mrs. Wessington continually reappears in Jack's life, begging him to reconsider, insisting that it was all just a mistake. But Jack wants nothing to do with her and continues to spurn her. Eventually Mrs. Wessington dies, much to Jack's relief. However, some time thereafter he sees her old rickshaw and assumes that someone has bought it. Then, to his astonishment, the rickshaw and the men pulling it pass through a horse, revealing themselves to be phantoms, bearing the departed ghost of Mrs. Wessington. This leads Jack into increasingly erratic behavior which he tries to cover up by concocting increasingly elaborate lies to assuage Kitty's suspicions. Eventually a Dr. Heatherlegh takes him in, supposing the visions to be the result of disease or madness. Despite their efforts, Kitty and her family become increasingly suspicious and eventually call off the engagement. Jack loses hope and begins wandering the city aimlessly, accompanied by the ghost of Mrs. Wessington.

== My Own True Ghost Story ==
The narrator, while staying at a dâk-bungalow in Katmal, India, hears someone in the next room playing billiards. He assumes that it is a group of doolie-bearers who've just arrived. The next morning he complains, only to learn that there were no coolies in the dâk-bungalow the night before. The owner then tells him that ten years ago it was a billiard-hall. An engineer who had been fond of the billiard hall had died somewhere far from it and they suspected that it was his ghost that occasionally came to visit it.

== The Strange Ride of Morrowbie Jukes ==
One evening Morrowbie Jukes, an Englishman, is feeling a bit feverish and the barking of the dogs outside his tent is upsetting him. So he mounts his horse in order to pursue them. The horse bolts and they eventually fall into a sandy ravine on the edge of a river. He awakens the next morning to find himself in a village of the living dead, where people who appear to have died of, for instance, cholera, but who revived when their bodies were about to be burned, are imprisoned. He quickly learns that it is impossible to climb out because of the sandy slope. And the river is doubly treacherous with quicksand and a rifleman who will try to pick them off. He recognizes one man there, a Brahmin named Gunga Dass. Gunga has become ruthless, but he does feed Jukes with dead crow. Eventually Jukes discovered that another Englishman had been there and died. On his corpse Jukes finds a note explaining how to safely get through the quicksand. After Jukes explains it to Gunga, Gunga confesses to murdering the Englishman for fear of being left behind. They plan their escape for that evening, when the rifleman will be unable to see them in the dark. When the time to escape arrives, Gunga knocks Jukes unconscious and escapes alone. When Jukes awakes he is found by the boy who kept his dogs and is helped to escape by means of a rope.

== The Man Who Would Be King ==
The narrator, a journalist, meets two colorful characters, Daniel Dravot and Peachey Carnahan, while traveling. Later, they seek him out at his printing press in Lahore to look at books and maps about Kafiristan. He then plays witness to their vow to each other to become kings of Kafiristan, a venture which he sees as ill-advised. Two years later, Carnahan returns and informs the narrator that he and Dravot indeed reached Kafiristan. While there, they were seen as gods and eventually Dravot was made king. The two men taught the Kafiristanis military tactics and how to use rifles. Eventually, Dravot decided to take a Kafiristani woman as his wife, but, in her terror, she bit him. Upon seeing him bleed, the priests realized that he was not a god and the Kafiristanis immediately sought to kill Dravot and Carnahan. One clan chief, whom they called "Billy Fish", helped them to escape, but they eventually were caught and Dravot was dropped from a rope bridge into a gorge to his death. The Kafiristanis crucified Carnahan, but let him go when he was still alive the next morning, and he slowly made his way back to Lahore over the next year. The narrator puts Peachey in an asylum, where he dies soon thereafter. Dravot's severed head and golden crown, which Carnahan was carrying with him when he visited the narrator, are not found among his possessions.
