= Indian Railway Library =

The Indian Railway Library was an enterprise conducted in Allahabad from 1888. It was a publishing venture of A. H. Wheeler & Co., who "had the monopoly on bookstall sales on Indian railway stations" It was a series of pamphlets intended to catch the interest of railway passengers, and offer cheap "throwaway" reading material.

The series began as a result of an initiative by Rudyard Kipling as he sought to assemble funds to return to England from India in 1888: he approached the senior partner of A. H. Wheeler & Co., Émile Moreau, with the proposal to publish his stories in cheap booklet form. The booklets were to have grey-green card covers, with illustrations by Rudyard's father John Lockwood Kipling.

Six booklets were initially produced, which sold at the price of one rupee. They were all by Rudyard Kipling, and consisted mainly of reprints of stories that had already appeared in various of the periodicals for which he was already writing in India. They were all published in 1888. Twenty volumes followed, of which nineteen were by other authors; the last appears to have been published in 1894.

The following volumes were included:

By Kipling:

- No. 1: Soldiers Three: a collection of stories setting forth certain passages in the lives and adventures of Privates Terence Mulvaney, Stanley Ortheris and John Learoyd done into type and edited by Rudyard Kipling., 97 pp.: "Reprinted in chief from the Week’s news"
- No. 2: The Story of the Gadsbys, 100 pp: "Reprinted in chief from the Week’s news"
- No. 3: In Black and White, 108 pp.: "Reprinted in chief from the Week’s news"
- No. 4: Under the Deodars, 106 pp.: "Reprinted in chief from the Week’s news"
- No. 5: The Phantom 'Rickshaw and other Eerie Tales, 114 pp
- No. 6: Wee Willie Winkie and Other Child Stories, 104 pp.: "Reprinted in chief from the Week’s news"
- No. 14: The City of Dreadful Night and Other Places (1888)

Other authors:

- No. 7: The Colonel's Crime: A Story of To-day; and, Jim's Wife - Ivan O'Beirne. 1889.
- No. 8: The Heart of a Maid - Bernice Grange, pseud. [= Alice Kipling]. 1890.
- No. 9: Closer than a Brother - G. B. Stuart; [and] Two Broken Hearts. 1890.
- No. 10: The Subaltern, the Policeman and the Little Girl: An Anglo-Indian Sketch Written in English - Brownlow Fforde. 1890.
- No. 11: Doctor Victor: A Sketch - Ivan O'Beirne. 1891.
- No. 12: The Trotter: A Poona Mystery - Arthur Brownlow Fforde. 1890.
- No. 13: Whiffs: Anglo-Indian and Indian - Lunkah. 1891.
- No. 15: The Maid and the Idol: A Tangled Story of Poona - Arthur Brownlow Fforde. 1891.
- No. 16: Dr. Rollison's Dilemma - L. E. Tiddeman. 1892.
- No. 17: Major Craik's Craze - Ivan O'Beirne. 1892.
- No. 18: Felix Holt Secundus, and A Tosa Monogatari of Modern Times - James Murdoch. [189-?].
- No. 19: Cigarette Papers - S. Levett-Yeats [= Sidney Kilner Levett Yeats]. 1893.
- No. 20: The Wooing of Webster. Faustus Junior, Ph. D. The Bear Hunt on Fuji-san. - A. M.
- No. 21: The Widow Lamport - S. Levett-Yeats [= Sidney Kilner Levett Yeats]. 1893.
- No. 22: A Yoshiwara Episode: Fred Wilson's Fate - James Murdoch
- No. 23: A Romance of Bureaucracy - Alpha-Beta. 1893.
- No. 24: That Little Owl: A Tale of a Lunatic, a Loafer, and a Lover - Arthur Brownlow Fforde.
- No. 25: Bought to Bay - H. D. E. Forbes. 1894.
- No. 26: Mr. & Mrs. John Brown at Home - John Brown. 1893.

The One-Eyed Forger, and Other Detective Stories by R. Reid, and Under the Rose by Ivan O'Beirne were announced but probably not published.
