= In Black and White (short story collection) =

1888 collection of eight short stories by Rudyard Kipling

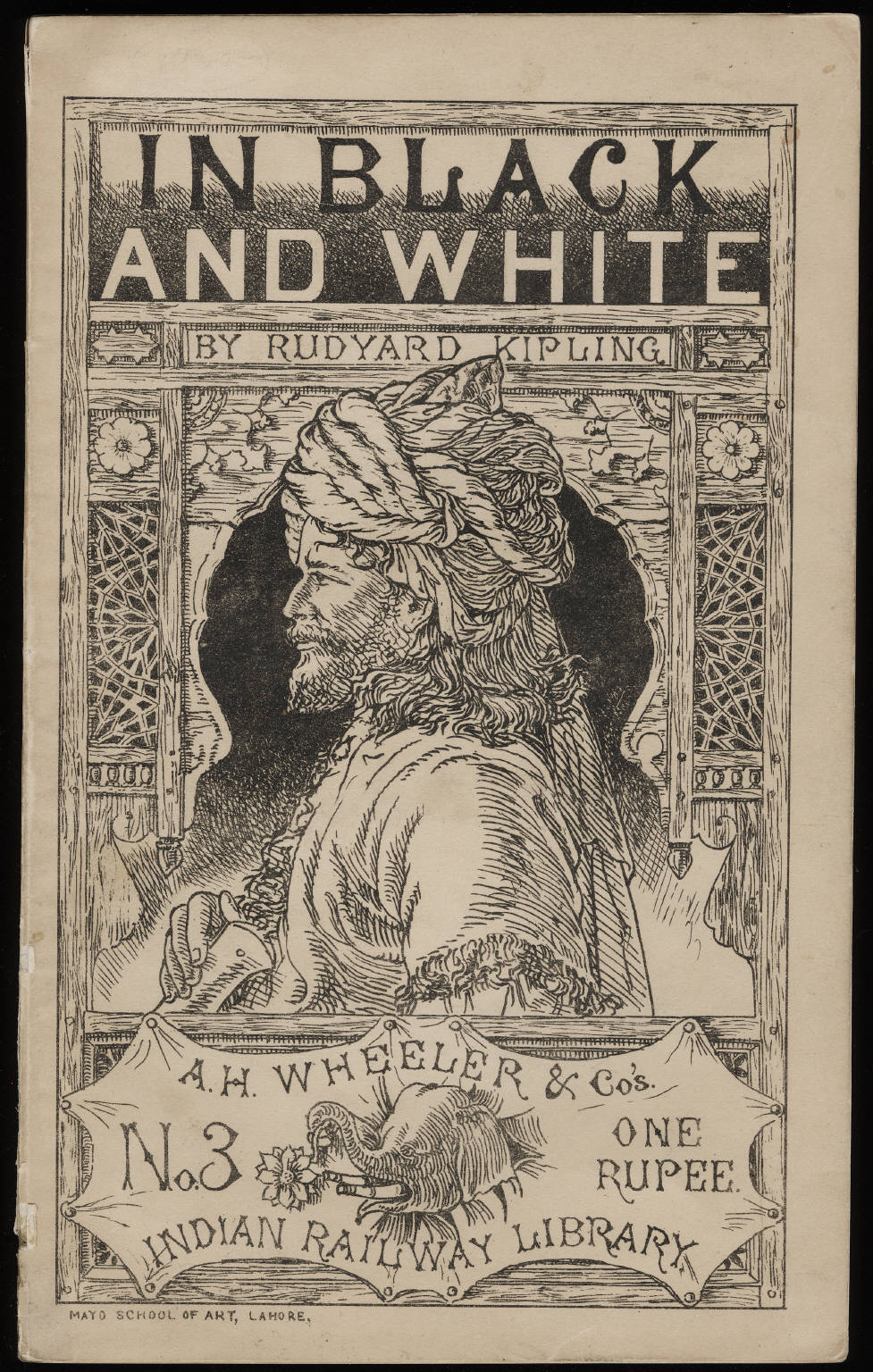
Published in Allahabad in 1888

In Black and White is a collection of eight short stories by Rudyard Kipling which was first published in a booklet of 108 pages as no. 3 of A H Wheeler & Co.'s Indian Railway Library in 1888. It was subsequently published in a book along with nos 1 and 2, Soldiers Three (1888) and The Story of the Gadsbys, as Soldiers Three (1899). The characters about whom the stories are concerned are native Indians, rather than the British for writing about whom Kipling may be better known; four of the stories are narrated by the Indians, and four by an observant wise English journalist (the persona that Kipling likes to adopt). The stories are:

- "Dray Wara Yow Dee" – told by an Afghan (Pathan) narrator
- "The Judgement of Dungara" – told by an English narrator
- "At Howli Thana" – told by an Indian narrator
- "Gemini" – told by an Indian narrator
- "At Twenty-Two" – told by an English narrator
- "In Flood Time" – told by an Indian narrator
- "The Sending of Dana Dee" – told by an English narrator
- "On the City Wall" – told by an English narrator

== "Dray Wara Yow Dee" ==
This story details a Pathan man who runs across his unnamed, English friend whom he calls "Sahib" throughout the story. The narrator tells the Sahib a story about his wife who was of the Abazai tribe, whom he married to bring peace amongst the Pathan and Abazai. One day, he tells his wife he will be gone fifteen days, but is only gone twelve. Upon returning one night, he hears a man singing: "Dray wara yow dee" or "all three are one." The narrator tries to sneak up on the pair, but a rock slides under his foot, and the man, an Abazai man named Daoud Shah, runs away, fearing for his life. The Pathan man confronts his wife who confirms she loved the other man and laughs in his face. The narrator decapitates her and throws her into the Kabul River.

The narrator then explains to the Sahib his trip so far in chasing Daoud Shah, and how close he has gotten. He explains hearing the devil tell him where to go, and ignores the Sahib when he reminds him of the laws. Frequently the narrator will return to the saying "Dray wara yow dee" in what comes off as madness.

The story ends with the storyteller claiming that his running into the Sahib was a good omen; that he shall find Daoud Shah soon.

== "The Judgement of Dungara" ==
German missionary Justus Krenk and his wife come to the world of Buria Kol to spread the ways of Christianity and proper western societal traditions. High Priest Athon Dazé, of the Temple of Dungara, resents their efforts to change the ways of the people.

After converting forty members of Buria Kol, the Krenk's plan a ceremony to celebrate. With plans to make white clothes for the new converts, Athon Dazé suggests a plant that grows all around the Buria Kol for the fibers of the cloth. Grateful, Justus Krenk crafts the outfits accordingly.

When the day of the ceremony arrives, the new members start to complain of a burning pain and run for the river, wishing to return to the shield of the God Dungara. Dazé has tricked the Krenks into using poisonous plants to make the cloth, thus making it seem like the God Dungara's revenge.

The Krenks return to Europe in defeat.

== "At Howli Thana" ==
Another story told solely through direct dialogue, "At Howli Thana" is about a Pathan man named Afzal Khan, who is seeking a job from an Englishman—in doing so he describes his previous job as a policeman at the Howli Thana, where many dishonest officers worked—until discovered by an English officer called Yunkum Sahib.

In his retelling, Afzal Khan claims that one night, while the men slept at their post, an unknown individual came in and robbed the station of their weaponry and record book. To cover the mistake, they stage an elaborate story by destroying the post—only to find that the thief was Yunkum Sahib himself.

== "Gemini" ==
"Gemini" is a plea to the English justice system from a man named Durga Dass, against his twin brother (who is younger by "full three breaths") Ram Dass. Both bunnia or money lenders, the brothers begin working on the street of Isser Jang. Durga Dass, works honestly and makes little money, whereas Ram Dass is sneaky, and tricks a man only known to the reader as "landholder", into a debt that can only be paid by giving Ram Dass all his land.

Infuriated, the landholder sends men to attack Ram Dass, but instead mistakes Durga Dass for him. Beating him close to death, Durga Dass is left helpless, until his brother promises him to take care of him and seek revenge.

Taking Durga Dass to their aunt for care, Ram Dass also inquires about any possessions he should recover from Durga Dass's home and asserts that he will press on for revenge from the justice system for his brother, Durga Dass thanks him and falls into a sickly sleep for several days.

Upon awakening, Durga Dass realizes all of his possessions are gone, as are his brother and aunt. The townspeople are surprised to see Durga Dass, and shame him for having been tricked.

== "At Twenty-Two" ==
An old, coal mining, blind man named Janki Meah has recently taken a new young, beautiful wife named Unda, as a result of selling the oil given to him by the mining company. Unfortunately, Unda is in love with Kundoo, a man who works with her husband.

One day there is a flood in the mines, and it traps both Janki Meah and Kundoo, along with other members of their "gang" and ten basket women are trapped inside their galleries. Luckily, Janki Meah, in his blindness, has familiarized himself with the mines and leads the group to an alternative route to freedom.

As a result, Janki Meah gets his pension, but his wife Unda still leaves him for Kundoo in the end.

== "In Flood Time" ==
An Englishman is angrily held up on his journey by a flood, and takes refuge with a man living by the ford, who frequently helps people cross the river.

During the Englishman's stay, the man tells him of when he was young and strong, and in love with a Hindi girl from across the river. Although they could not marry, they would frequently meet in a field—and one day when they planned to meet, this man swam through a flood like no other to meet her.

By the end of the story, the flood waters have subsided, and the man tells the Englishman to hurry so that he can cross the river before the levels rise again.

== "The Sending of Dana Da" ==
Dana Da is supposedly a man who has abilities beyond any religious comprehension—but is best when aided with opium and whiskey. Having heard this, an Englishman pays the man ten rupees, and Dana Da promises to send a Sending to a man whom he hates, Lone Sahib.

Knowing that the Lone Sahib hates cats, Dana Da has kittens mysteriously appear over a span of several days, in random places in the Lone Sahib's path. The Englishman hears of this and asks how he does it—the Dana Da on his deathbed explains the elaborate trick, in which a man he knows who works with the Lone Sahib places kittens from his village in the Lone Sahib's way.

== "On The City Wall" ==
Lalun, a beautiful and talented woman, lives and entertains along the city way of Lahore. Visited by many men, one named Wali Dad is especially friendly. Wali Dad has had an English education and feel uncomfortably placed between the European and English worlds.

As the story continues, the reader gets an introduction to a leader Khem Singh, someone who may disrupt British rule in India. Khem Singh has been imprisoned though, but escapes. A riot breaks out and Lalun helps an old man out of the riot through her window. She asks the narrator for assistance in getting him through the city safely, and he agrees, only to later realize it is Khem Singh.

He returns the man to captivity and the rebellion ceases.

== Common themes in "In Black and White" ==
=== Revenge ===
In several of Kipling's stories within his collection of In Black and White, revenge is the basis of the plotline. Within "Dray Wara Yow Dee", "The Judgement of Dungara", and "Gemini", actions of the primary characters are greatly fueled by the act of revenge.

Each character motivated by revenge is an Indian character—but whether or not that was intended by Kipling is unknown.

=== European Ignorance ===
In two stories within this collection, Kipling criticizes the ignorance of European colonizers of Indian life. This can be seen with the missionaries in "The Judgement of Dungara" and the acts of the British in "On the City Wall".

== Narrative Styles ==
Within In Black and White, Kipling utilizes two recurring ways of telling his stories depending on the race of the narrator. For example, in the stories in which the narrator is not white, the reader gets only words from that speaker's mouth, with little to no dialogue. The narrator is also always speaking to an Englishman, from whom we never get a direct quotation. This can be seen in "Dray Wara Yow Dee", "At Howli Thana", "Gemini", and "In Flood Time".

Other stories are instead told from the perspective of a third person speaker, there is a more traditional layout of the story, with dialogue, characters, clear storyline, etcetera. This is seen in "The Judgement of Dungara", "At Twenty-Two", "The Sending of Dana Da", and "On the City Wall".
