= Under the Deodars =

Collection of short stories by Rudyard Kipling

- Original publication
- Author: Rudyard Kipling (English)
- Language: English
- Series: Indian Railway Library
- Publisher: A. H. Wheeler & Co.
- Publication date: January 1889
- Publication place: British India
- Media type: Print (hardback & paperback)

Under the Deodars (published January 1889) is a collection of short stories by Rudyard Kipling.

== The Education of Otis Yeere ==
Mrs. Hauksbee decides to start a salon in Simla, but Mrs. Mallowe talks her out of it. She then explains to Mrs. Hauksbee that she's experiencing a mid-life crisis and that she came out of her own by becoming an Influence in the life of a young man. So Mrs. Hauksbee decides to try the same. Against Mrs. Mallowe's warnings, she chooses Otis Yeere. Everything seems to be going according to plan—Otis Yeere is coming up in the world, by virtue of his association with Mrs. Hauksbee. And Mrs. Hauksbee platonically encourages his attentions. But one day she learns that everything has not gone according to plan when he tries to kiss her.

== At the Pit's Mouth ==
The wife of a man who is serving in the plains of India, leaving her alone in Simla, enters into an extra-marital affair with a 'Tertium quid'. They often rendezvous at the cemetery. On one occasion they see a grave being dug and it ruins the atmosphere for them. They decide to run away to Tibet together, but while going the Tertium Quid's horse is spooked. Horse and rider tumble from the road, which passes by the cemetery. The Tertium Quid is killed in the fall and is buried in the freshly dug grave.

== A Wayside Comedy ==
Major and Mrs. Vansuythen come to live at the station of Kashima. After a time, Mrs. Boulte comes to suspect that her husband has fallen for Mrs. Vansuythen. So when he confronts her about whether she loves him or not, she admits her own affair with Captain Kurrell. Mr. Boulte is overjoyed and carries the news to Mrs. Vansuythen, imploring her to run away with him. Mrs. Vansuythen, however, becomes distraught to learn that she has not been the only one receiving attentions from Captain Kurrell. The last to find out is Captain Kurrell, who loses both women in one swoop. Mrs. Vansuythen informs both men that she hates them and refuses to see either again. Mr. Boulte and Captain Kurrell become friends, so that both may prevent the other from causing either Mrs. Boulte or Mrs. Vansuythen any grief.

== The Hill of Illusion ==
A man just come back from the plains of India to see the married woman he wants to elope with becomes jealous when he learns that she has been keeping appointments with other men while he has been away. She then asks if he's ever courted any other girls and becomes jealous when he admits that he has. When they part company she begins acting evasively, prompting him to suspect that one of those men was more significant than he'd feared.

== A Second-rate Woman ==
Mrs. Hauksbee gossips with Mrs. Mallowe and is highly critical of Mrs. Delville, whom she calls 'The Dowd' (on account of her out-of-style dress), and a man whom she calls 'The Dancing Master' (because he dances so poorly), who seems to be courting her. Mrs. Hauksbee becomes more alarmed when a young man, the Hawley Boy, whom she's been grooming to marry the Holt girl, takes an interest in Mrs. Delville. Her estimation of Mrs. Delville improves a little, though, when Mrs. Delville rejects 'The Dancing Master' after learning that he was married and had a family. Later, when Mrs. Hauksbee is helping take care of children during an epidemic of diphtheria, she gains a greater appreciation of Mrs. Delville when the latter saves a child who is choking to death. It is later revealed that Mrs. Delville lost a child in the same manner.

== Only a Subaltern ==
Bobby Wick is made a subaltern and he joins a regiment called the Tyneside Tail Twisters. One of the soldiers, Dormer, has a temper and is constantly getting into trouble. Bobby takes him fishing and makes friends with him, eventually inspiring him to improve his behaviour and become a better soldier. Bobby has this sort of effect on most of the soldiers in his regiment. Bobby goes on leave to Simla, but is called back early because cholera is spreading through the regiment. Bobby rallies the spirits of many of the men, aiding in their recovery. When Dormer falls ill, Bobby spends the whole night in the tent, holding his hand. Bobby then falls ill and though he fights to stay alive (in part because he'd left a girl back in Simla), he eventually succumbs to the disease. When a convalescent private, Conklin, declares that another officer has died, Dormer rebukes him and declares that Bobby Wick was an angel.

== In the Matter of a Private ==
A soldier in barracks snaps under repeated teasing and takes his rifle to his tormentor.

== The Enlightenments of Pagett, M. P. ==
A Member of the British Parliament visits an old school friend who is now an administrator in India. He finds that his theoretical ideas on Indian democracy do not match the realities of the people and country.
