= Fairy-Kist =

- Short story by Rudyard Kipling
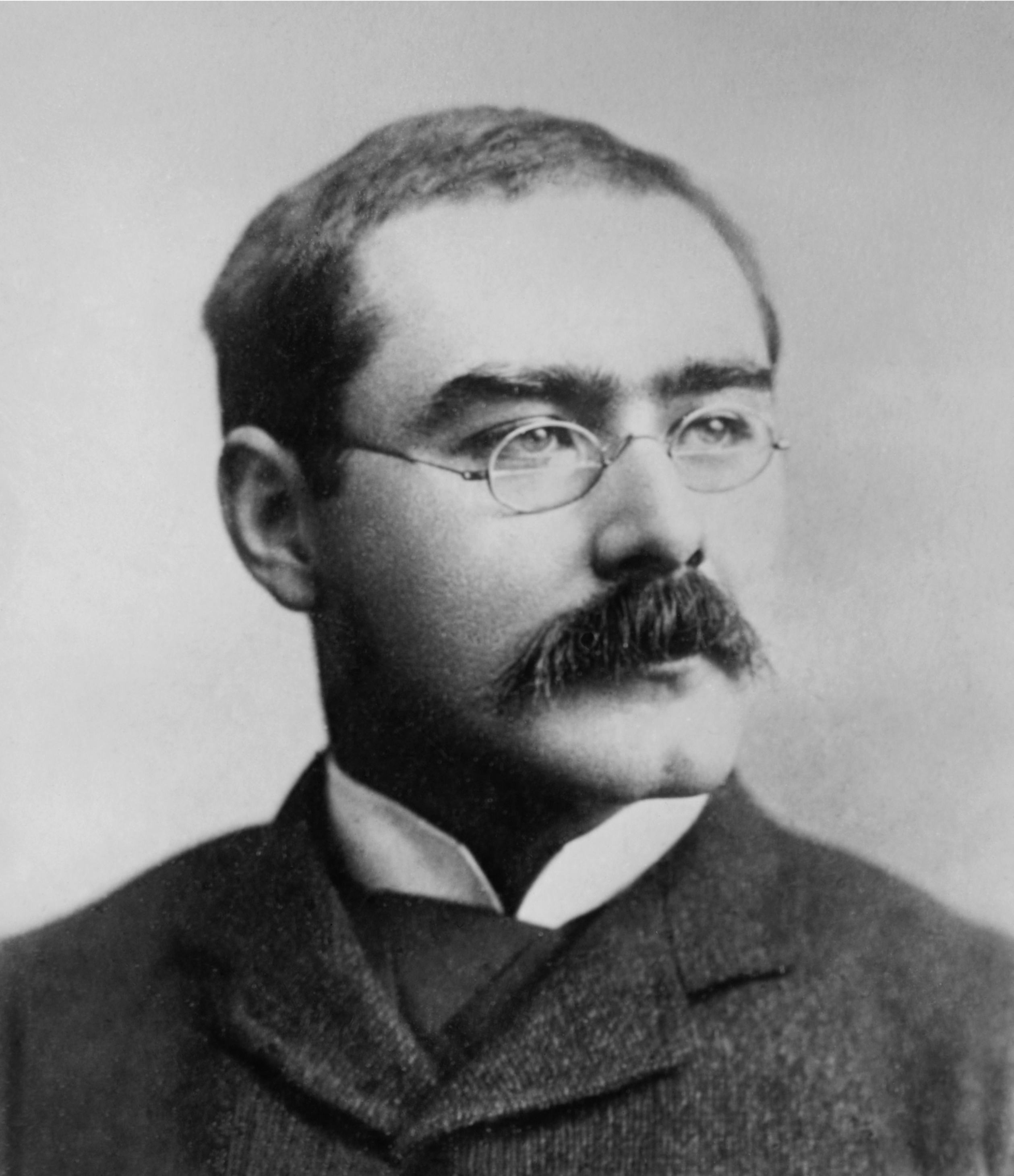
- Country: United Kingdom
- Language: English
- Genre: Short story

Publication

"Fairy-Kist" is a short story by Rudyard Kipling. It first appeared in 1927 in the Canadian Maclean's Magazine. It was after published in 1928 in England in the Strand Magazine, illustrated by C. E. Brock. It finally came out in book format in 1932, in the collection Limits and Renewals.

== Plot ==
The story is framed with a dinner party attended by the narrator where one of his friends, a doctor named Keede, relates a youthful adventure.

The body of a young girl was found outside his village one night under mysterious circumstances. A trowel was found by her body, apparently the weapon with which the murder had been committed. Her lover was suspected; they had quarrelled that night, but there was no evidence against him and the affair was dropt for a time.

Keede himself had suspicions in another quarter; he had passed the spot on the night and seen a man with a woman's body, and not realising she was dead, reported the affair to the police. They ignored the clew, and Keede determined to "play Sherlock Holmes" on his own account.

He was able to trace the man by the plates on his motorcycle, and Keede and a friend paid him a visit at his house. They found him to be a returned soldier, Henry Wollin, now an enthusiastic gardener, in the care of his housekeeper. She told them how he had been wounded and gassed in the Great War, come home suffering from shock - Fairy-kist she called it - and how she had nursed him ever since.

Wollin, realising from their questioning that he was suspected, appeared to flee disappeared for some time. On his reappearance Keede and his friend Lemming had returned to the scent, only to learn that the murder had been solved and their suspicions were groundless - a passing lorry had struck and killed the girl. Puzzled as to why Wollin had behaved in so guilty a fashion, Keede eventually discovered the truth from himself.

He had been out that night on his motorcycle on one of his customary eccentric expeditions, planting flowers. Coming across the girl's body, had stopt to investigate when Keede coming up in his car had so panicked him that he had fled, leaving his trowel behind. Terrified of being suspected of the murder, he had bought a new trowel, and committed other similar acts to hide his own trail, and incidentally make himself seem the real criminal. When he thought the police were on his track he had hidden in his cellar for a month. Wollin was even afraid of being arrested for planting roots in the country, as he had been on the night of the tragedy. He is convinced he is mad, and had heard voices while he had been in hospital bidding him plant gardens. In fact, Keede's friend Lemming, a doctor, discovered that the supposed voices had been no more than the hospital nurse reading to him a book, Mrs Ewing's Mary's Meadow, while he had been delirious. When he explained this to Wollin, the latter was vastly relieved, and realising that he was not mad, had recovered forthwith.

== Criticism ==
The story's reception from the critical world was mixed but, on the whole, unfavourable. Like many of Kipling's other works, its theme is the trauma of returned soldiers.
