= Soldiers Three =

1888 collection of short stories by Rudyard Kipling

Soldiers Three is a collection of short stories by Rudyard Kipling. The three soldiers of the title are Learoyd, Mulvaney and Ortheris, who had also appeared previously in the collection Plain Tales from the Hills. The current version, dating from 1899 and more fully titled Soldiers Three and other stories, consists of three sections which each had previously received separate publication in 1888; Learoyd, Mulvaney and Ortheris appear only in the first section, which is also titled Soldiers Three. The books reveal a side of the British Tommy in Afghanistan rarely seen in the Twilight of the British Empire. The soldiers comment on their betters, act the fool, but cut straight to the rawness of war in central Asia as the British began to loosen their Imperial hold.

== Publication history ==
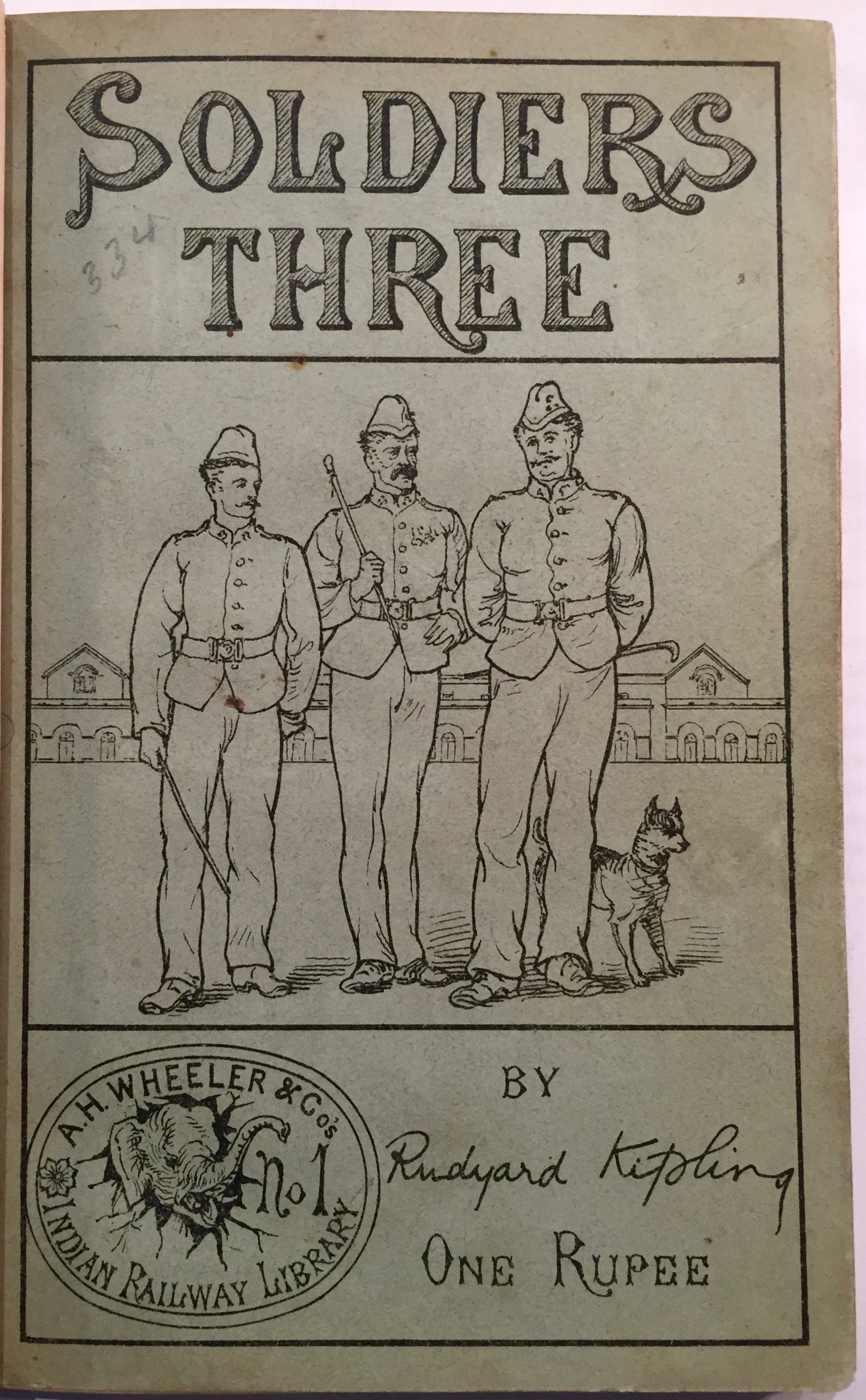
First publication

The first publication of a collection of seven stories called Soldiers Three was as No 1 of A.H. Wheeler & Co.’s Indian Railway Library, a slim volume of 97 pages printed at the “Pioneer” Press, Allahabad in 1888 called Soldiers Three: a collection of stories setting forth certain passages in the lives and adventures of Privates Terence Mulvaney, Stanley Ortheris and John Learoyd, done into type and edited by Rudyard Kipling. In 1899, it became part of the book Soldiers Three and Other Stories, known to most people by the simpler title Soldiers Three. It is this collection whose contents are listed here. To the original Soldiers Three were added nos 2 and 3 of the Indian Railway Library, The Story of the Gadsbys, which is written in dramatic form, and In Black and White, looking more at the native Indians than the British. Both of these were also published in 1888. (The phrase 'Soldiers Three' may be used in writings about Kipling to group the three heroes of this collection: see Learoyd, Mulvaney and Ortheris.)

Soldiers Three (in the Indian Railway Library edition) became the second collection of short stories by Rudyard Kipling to be published, after Plain Tales from the Hills (in which the 'Three Soldiers' also appear). Like it, it was collected from some of the fiction he had published in journals; but while Plain Tales was mostly collected from the Civil and Military Gazette, this was "Reprinted in chief from the Week's news", an Allahabad paper.

== Contents ==
The 1899 edition contains:

=== Soldiers Three: A Collection of Stories ===
- "The God from the Machine"
- "Private Learoyd's Story"
- "The Big Drunk Draf'"
- "The Solid Muldoon"
- "With the Main Guard"
- "In the Matter of a Private"
- "Black Jack"
- "Only a Subaltern"

=== The Story of the Gadsbys: A Tale without a Plot ===
(first published as no. 2 in the Indian Railway Library: eight 'stories' in dramatic form, with a final poem in four verses)

- "Poor Dear Mamma"
- "The World Without"
- "The Tents of Kedar"
- "With any Amazement"
- "The Garden of Eden"
- "Fatima"
- "The Valley of the Shadow"
- "The Swelling of Jordan"
- "L'Envoi" (a poem)

=== In Black and White ===
- "Dray Wara Yow Dee"
- "The Judgement of Dungara"
- "At Howli Thana"
- "Gemini"
- "At Twenty-Two"
- "In Flood Time"
- "The Sending of Dana Dee"
- "On the City Wall"
