= Wee Willie Winkie (film) =

1937 film by John Ford

- Theatrical release poster
- Directed by: John Ford
- Written by: Ernest Pascal; Julien Josephson; Mordaunt Shairp (uncredited)
- Based on: Wee Willie Winkie an 1888 story in Week's News by Rudyard Kipling
- Produced by: Darryl F. Zanuck; Gene Markey (associate)
- Starring: Shirley Temple; Victor McLaglen; C. Aubrey Smith; June Lang; Michael Whalen; Cesar Romero
- Cinematography: Arthur Miller
- Edited by: Walter Thompson
- Music by: Alfred Newman
- Distributed by: 20th Century-Fox
- Release date: June 25, 1937 (Los Angeles)
- Running time: 100 minutes
- Country: United States
- Language: English
- Budget: over $1 million

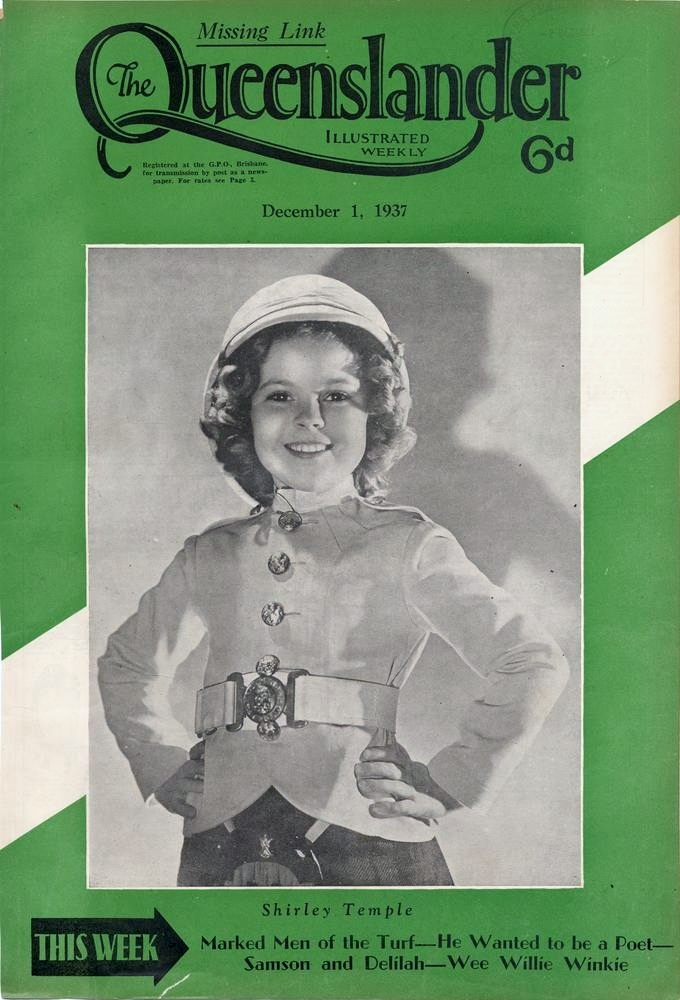
Front cover of The Queenslander to publicize the film in Australia

Wee Willie Winkie is a 1937 American adventure drama film directed by John Ford and starring Shirley Temple, Victor McLaglen, C. Aubrey Smith, June Lang, Michael Whalen, and Cesar Romero. The screenplay by Ernest Pascal and Julien Josephson was based on an 1888 story by Rudyard Kipling that concerns the British presence in 19th-century India. The production was filmed largely at the Iverson Movie Ranch in Chatsworth, California, where a number of elaborate sets were built for the film. It is noteworthy for not having any elaborate song or dance routines, which had become staples in Temple's films for 20th Century-Fox.

This film was the first of three in which Temple and Romero appear together: the second was Ali Baba Goes to Town (1937, in which both make cameo appearances as themselves), and the third was The Little Princess (1939). At the 10th Academy Awards, William S. Darling and David S. Hall were nominated for Best Art Direction for their work on the film.

== Plot ==
In 1897, during the British Raj, Sergeant Donald MacDuff escorts Joyce Williams, an impoverished young widow, and her daughter, Priscilla, to a military outpost on the northern frontier of British occupied India to live with her stern father-in-law, Colonel Williams. Along the way, they witness the capture of freedom fighter chief Khoda Khan. Soon, Priscilla, nicknamed "Wee Willie Winkie" by MacDuff, wins the hearts of all the soldiers, especially MacDuff and her grandfather. Even Khan is touched by her visits to cheer him up in his captivity, and her returning a lost necklace to him. Meanwhile, Joyce is courted by Lieutenant Brandes, who Priscilla nicknames "Coppy".

Khan is rescued by his men in a night raid. MacDuff is part of the patrol that attempts to recapture him, and is severely wounded. He dies in the hospital while Priscilla sings "Auld Lang Syne" to him, though she initially thinks he has only fallen asleep.

Priscilla decides to persuade Khan to stop fighting, and Mohammet Dihn, a servant who is secretly Khan's spy, smuggles her out of the base and takes her to the impenetrable rebel mountain fortress. Khan is greatly pleased, surmising the colonel will bring his entire regiment in a hopeless attempt to rescue her. The British troops soon arrive, demanding Khan surrender Priscilla, and, as his men prepare for battle, he orders that Dihn be thrown over a wall, presumably to his death.

Colonel Williams halts his force at a safe distance and walks alone to the entrance. A few of Khan's men shoot at Williams, but he is undeterred, and Priscilla eventually breaks away and rushes to her grandfather's side. Impressed by the colonel's courage and overcome with empathy for the child, Khan orders his men to stop firing. He agrees to negotiate, and the rebellion ends.

== Cast ==
- Shirley Temple as Priscilla "Winkie" Williams
- Victor McLaglen as Sergeant Donald MacDuff
- C. Aubrey Smith as Colonel Williams
- June Lang as Joyce Williams
- Michael Whalen as Lieutenant "Coppy" Brandes
- Cesar Romero as Khoda Khan
- Constance Collier as Mrs. Allardyce
- Douglas Scott as Mott
- Gavin Muir as Captain Bibberbeigh
- Willie Fung as Mohammet Dihn
- Brandon Hurst as Bagby
- Lionel Pape as Major Allardyce
- Clyde Cook as Pipe Major Sneath
- Lauri Beatty as Elsie Allardyce
- Lionel Braham as Major General Hammond
- Mary Forbes as Mrs. MacMonachie
- Cyril McLaglen as Corporal Tummel
- Pat Somerset as Officer
- Hector Sarno as Driver
- Harry Tenbrook as Soldier (uncredited)

== Production ==
Production of the film had to be moved from the Fox Studio Lot to Chatsworth, California, owing to intense conflicts taking place between labor unions and Hollywood studios at the time. During one standoff, a Fox studio messenger visiting the set nearly had a light dropped on his head after scolding a stagehand who complained about working conditions. During the shoot, Temple's mother, Gertrude, was hospitalized for two weeks with an unspecified stomach ailment. Shortly after the film was completed, an unknown gunman fired a shot at Temple and her mother as they were walking into their home with a group of other people.

Until The Little Princess (1939), Wee Willie Winkie was Shirley Temple's most expensive film. Ford was notorious for his distaste of working with child stars, but he was drawn to this project for its large budget and strong supporting cast, including Ford-favorite Victor McLaglen. He was initially indifferent towards Temple, but his demeanor changed after Sergeant MacDuff's death scene, as he was pleased with the restraint shown in her performance and impressed by her professionalism. Temple and Ford remained friends for many years, with Ford being chosen as the godfather of Temple's oldest daughter, and Temple being cast in Ford's 1948 film Fort Apache.

According to Temple, this was her favorite of her films:

Of all my films I rate Wee Willie Winkie the best, but for all the wrong reasons. It was best because of its manual of arms, the noisy marching around in military garb with brass buttons, my kilts bouncing. It was best because of daredevil stunts with snipers and stampeding horses. It was also best because I finally seemed to earn the professional respect of someone so blood-and-thunder macho as Ford. Best of all, the watery-blue color of my portable dressing room had been repainted in regimental red.

== Reception ==
Frank S. Nugent of The New York Times called the film "a pleasing enough little fiction, sure to delight every Temple addict and likely to win the grudging approval even of those who, like myself, are biding their time until she grows up, becomes gawky and is a has-been at 15." Variety praised the film's "realistic and elaborate backgrounds and tense reality", as well as "good comedy" between Temple and McLaglen, but suggested that it was too long for Temple's younger fans to be able to sit through. Harrison's Reports wrote: "Very good! Although Shirley, as usual, predominates, the producers have wisely surrounded her with capable players...The story has comedy, romance, and thrills, and holds one's attention throughout." John Mosher wrote that the film "isn't much as a Shirley Temple tryout...Miss Temple's talent is rather overexploited at times, and she seems just a bit too pert."

=== Libel action against Graham Greene ===
Writing for Night and Day in 1937, Graham Greene gave the film a mildly positive review, complaining about the manufactured ingenue of the Temple's handlers, but otherwise observing that the Hollywood treatment is an improvement over the original Kipling version. The review also said the nine-year-old star displayed "a dubious coquetry", which appealed to "middle-aged men and clergymen", however, which provoked Temple and the British and American branches of Twentieth-Century Fox to sue Greene, Night and Day, its publisher (Chatto & Windus), and its printers (Hazell, Watson and Viney) for libel. The case appeared before the King's Bench in 1938, and a settlement was announced the following day. Speaking on behalf of Greene, Night and Day, and the publisher, Valentine Holmes, the counsel for the defense, attempted to frame the review as saying the film was one to which anybody could take their children, but the Lord Chief Justice who prevailed over the hearing declared the printed review "libel...simply a gross outrage" and fined the defendants £3500 (Note: The details of the settlement were such that Shirley Temple was to receive £2000 (equivalent to £116,400 in 2025) in compensation to partially defray court costs, and the film corporation and company would receive £1000 (£58,200) and £500 (£29,100), respectively. The film and company would donate their portion of the judgement to charity.) (equivalent to £203,700 in 2025). Greene left the UK until after the trial was over to live in Mexico, where he developed the ideas for the novel often considered his masterpiece, The Power and the Glory (1940).

== Home media ==
In 2009, the film was available on videocassette and DVD in the original toned and tinted version, as well as in black and white, and colorized. Some releases had theatrical trailers and special features.

== See also ==
- Shirley Temple filmography
