= Rudyard Kipling's Verse: Definitive Edition =

English poetry collection

The Definitive Edition of the verse of Rudyard Kipling (1865–1936) was published in 1940 in London by Hodder and Stoughton, Ltd and in Edinburgh by R. R. Clark. It is a one-volume collection and was printed on India paper.

The bibliographical information given on the verso of the title page (the 'Edition notice') of the 1958 reprint of the 1940 edition gives the following information (years link to corresponding "[year] in poetry" article):

- The first edition of Kipling's Collected Verse (1885–1912) was published in 1912, with a reprint in the same year.
- The second collected edition, the Inclusive Edition (1885–1918) was first published in 3 volumes in December 1919. A second impression came out in April 1920.
  - This edition (inclusive of his verse from 1885 to 1918) was issued as a single volume in October 1921, and went through 18 further impressions by August 1926.
- The third collected edition (Inclusive Edition, 1885 - 1926) appeared as a single volume in September 1927. 11 more impressions came out by October 1931.
- The fourth Inclusive Edition of Rudyard Kipling's Verse (1885–1932), in one volume, appeared in October 1933, and was followed by six impressions up to November 1939.
- The Definitive Edition of Rudyard Kipling's Verse appeared posthumously in 1940. It was reprinted — the edition notice of the 1958 reprint states — in 1941, 1949 and 1958.
- In 2013, The Cambridge Edition of the Poems of Rudyard Kipling was published and included 50 previously unpublished poems alongside more than 1300 previously, though often rarely, published poems in a three-volume edition.

Many other versions of Kipling's verse have been made. These include

  - Kipling, Rudyard (1913) Songs from Books, London, Macmillan.
  - Kipling, Rudyard (1925) A choice of songs from the verse of Rudyard Kipling, London, Methuem.
  - Kipling, Rudyard (1941) A Choice of Kipling's Verse made by T.S.Eliot, with an essay on RUDYARD KIPLING, London, Faber and Faber.
  - Kipling, Rudyard (1986) Early verse by Rudyard Kipling, 1879-1889: unpublished, uncollected, and rarely collected poems, Oxford, Clarendon Press.
  - Kipling, Rudyard (1992) Rudyard Kipling: selected poetry, London, Penguin.
  - Kipling, Rudyard (1994) The collected poems of Rudyard Kipling, introduction and notes by R. T. Jones, Ware, Wordsworth Editions.

== See also ==
- Rudyard Kipling bibliography
- 1940 in poetry
