= Debits and Credits (book) =

1926 collection of stories, poems and scenes from a play by Rudyard Kipling

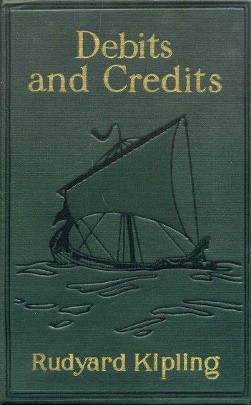
First edition (publ. Doubleday Page)

Debits and Credits is a 1926 collection of fourteen stories, nineteen poems, and two scenes from a play by Rudyard Kipling. Four of the poems that accompany the stories are whimsically presented as translations from the "Bk. V of Odes" by Horace, but are actually poems by Kipling imitating the style of the Roman poet.

== Contents ==
=== Stories ===
- "The Enemies to Each Other"

The story of Adam and Eve retold in the style of a Muslim fable

- "Sea Constables: a Tale of ’15"

Weekend sailors turned naval officers discuss their patrolling of the coast over dinner

- " 'In the Interests of the Brethren' "

An account of the generous hospitality of a Masonic Lodge in wartime

- "The United Idolaters"

A tale of school life, in which Stalky & Co discover Uncle Remus and outrage a new master

- "The Wish House"

An old Sussex woman talks about the love of her life and the price she paid for loving him

- "The Janeites"

A still-bewildered old soldier recalls how he came to join a 'secret society' of Jane Austen admirers and gives his own unique take on her oeuvre

- "The Prophet and the Country"

A stranded motorist meets an exiled American who explains his passionate objection to Prohibition

- "The Bull that Thought"

A story about an uncannily intelligent bull with a flair for the bullfight

- "A Madonna of the Trenches"

After the war, a soldier reveals the true cause of his "shell-shock"

- "The Propagation of Knowledge"

A tale of school life, in which Stalky & Co bait their English master with the Curiosities of Literature and the Baconian theory

- "A Friend of the Family"

An Australian soldier avenges his friend by waging war on the home front

- "On the Gate: a Tale of ’16"

A fantasy in which St Peter and the administrators of Heaven struggle to cope with the surge of souls from the war

- "The Eye of Allah"

In a mediaeval abbey, an artist shows some doctors an early microscope, which provokes debate

- "The Gardener"

A story about respectability and mother-love

=== Poems ===
- The Changelings
- The Vineyard
- ‘Banquet Night’
- To the Companions (Horace, ode 17, Bk. v.)
- The Centaurs
- ‘Late Came the God’
- Rahere
- The Survival (Horace, Ode 22 Bk. v.)
- Jane's Marriage
- The Portent (Horace, Ode 20, Bk, v.)
- Alnaschar and the Oxen
- Gipsy Vans
- The Birthright
- A Legend of Truth
- We and They
- The Supports
- Untimely
- The Last Ode: Nov. 27, B.C. 8 (Horace, Ode 31, Bk. v.)
- The Burden

=== Play Fragments ===
- Gow's Watch : Act IV. Sc. 4
- Gow's Watch: Act V. Sc. 3
