= Limits and Renewals =

Short story collection by Rudyard Kipling

Limits and Renewals is a short story collection published by Rudyard Kipling in 1932.

This was Kipling's last published collection. J. M. S. Tompkins wrote "The title, Limits and Renewals, is exactly appropriate to the content of the book; the limits are of many kinds, passable and impassable, and the renewals are of this world and of another."

== Contents ==
The collection contains the following short stories:

- Dayspring Mishandled
- The Woman in His Life
- The Tie
- The Church that was at Antioch
- Aunt Ellen
- Fairy-Kist
- A Naval Mutiny
- The Debt
- Akbar's Bridge
- The Manner of Men
- Unprofessional
- Beauty Spots
- The Miracle of Saint Jubanus
- The Tender Achilles
- Uncovenanted Mercies

Additionally, several poems were published:

- Gertrude's Prayer
- Dinah in Heaven
- Four-Feet
- The Totem
- The Disciple
- The Playmate
- Naaman's Song
- The Mother's Son
- The Coiner
- At his Execution
- The Threshold
- Neighbours
- The Expert
- The Curé
- Song of Seventy Horses
- Hymn to Physical Pain
- The Penalty
- Azrael's Count

== See also ==
- List of the works of Rudyard Kipling
- 1932 in literature
