= The Story of the Gadsbys =

- Short story by Rudyard Kipling
- Frontispiece The Story of the Gadsbys 1899
- Illustrator: L. J. Bridgman

Publication

The Story of the Gadsbys is a story by Rudyard Kipling. It was originally published as no. 2 of the Indian Railway Library in 1888. The Story of the Gadsbys is written in dramatic form, consisting of eight short scenes (listed below). This short pamphlet, of 100 pages, was later collected in book form as the second part of Soldiers Three.

- "Poor Dear Mamma"
- "The World Without"
- "The Tents of Kedar"
- "With any Amazement"
- "The Garden of Eden"
- "Fatima"
- "The Valley of the Shadow"
- "The Swelling of Jordan"
- "L'Envoi" (a poem)
