= From Sea to Sea and Other Sketches, Letters of Travel =

1899 travelogue by Rudyard Kipling

From Sea to Sea and Other Sketches, Letters of Travel is a book containing Rudyard Kipling's articles about his 1889 travels from India to Burma, China, Japan, and the United States en route to England.
