= Wee Willie Winkie and Other Child Stories =

1888 collection of short stories by Rudyard Kipling

- original publication
- Author: Rudyard Kipling (English)
- Language: English
- Series: Indian Railway Library
- Publisher: A H Wheeler & Co
- Publication date: 1888
- Publication place: British India
- Media type: Print (hardback & paperback)

Wee Willie Winkie and Other Child Stories (published 1888) is a collection of short stories by Rudyard Kipling.

== Wee Willie Winkie ==
Percival William Williams, affectionately called 'Wee Willie Winkie' because of the nursery rhyme, is the only son of the Colonel of the 195th. The six-year-old is well-liked by everyone in the regiment, but becomes especially good friends with a subaltern he nicknames 'Coppy'. One day, Winkie confesses to Coppy that he saw Coppy kissing Miss Allardyce, whose father is a Major. Coppy persuades Winkie to keep silent about the matter, since he is engaged to Miss Allardyce, but they haven't announced it yet. Three weeks later, Winkie sees Miss Allardyce ride her horse across the river in an attempt to prove her mettle. He knows that the 'Bad Men' (who he equates with the goblins in a storybook) live on the other side of the river, so he rides out after her, even though he is grounded. Miss Allardyce's horse stumbles and falls, and Miss Allardyce twists her ankle. Winkie catches up to her and sends his pony, Jack, back to the cantonment for help as some natives approach. The natives debate whether to return Miss Allardyce and Winkie for a reward or hold them for ransom. When Winkie's riderless horse returns to the cantonment, E Company immediately marshals and sets out to find him. The Company frightens away the natives, and Winkie is lauded as a hero for saving Miss Allardyce. He announces that people should start calling him by his given name because, as the narrator says, he has "enter[ed] into his manhood."

== Baa, Baa, Black Sheep ==
A young boy, Punch, and a young girl, Judy, are sent to live with their Aunt Rosa, Uncle Harry, and cousin Harry in England while their parents remain in Bombay, India. Uncle Harry is kind to Punch, but Aunt Rosa, a domineering Christian, treats him only with scorn and contempt. Life gets steadily worse for Punch (who is eventually renamed 'Black Sheep'), and his only escape from his insufferable life is in reading. Things take a turn for the worse when Uncle Harry, the only person besides Judy who shows Black Sheep any kindness, dies. Black Sheep is then sent to school and one day gets into a fight at school. This emboldens him, and he begins threatening his cousin Harry and Aunt Rosa that he will murder them. He also attempts suicide, though survives. During this time, a visitor to the house discovers that Black Sheep has nearly gone blind. When their mother comes to retrieve them, life quickly improves again for Black Sheep, and he goes back to being known as Punch.

== His Majesty the King ==
A child, named Toby (the eponymous 'His Majesty the King'), is generally ignored by his parents and is raised by a nurse, Miss Biddums. But more than anything, he wants his parents to love him. Unbeknownst to him, their coolness results from an affair his father once had. One afternoon, a package is left at the house, and he covets the string used to wrap it. He removes the string and, to his dismay, the wrapping paper falls off the box. Then, curious, he opens the box and discovers a jewel inside. He takes it to play with it, intending to give it back to his mother and apologise when she asks. But she never asks for it. Toby is wracked with guilt, eventually leading to his becoming ill. In a delirium, he confesses his theft to Miss Biddums. A note is found with the jewel, eventually leading to a reconciliation between his parents. When he wakes up from his fever, his parents give him all the love he could wish for.

== The Drums of the Fore and Aft ==
The narrator explains that it is generally known that the regiment known facetiously as the 'Fore and Aft' suffered an embarrassing defeat on their first foray into the battlefield. Part of this was due to the inexperience of both the men and the officers. The story concerns two drummer boys, Jakin and Lew, who are generally disorderly. When news comes that their company will be sent to the front, they convince the Colonel to let them come along. Several misunderstandings and mistakes resulted in the Fore and Aft rushing out to battle before they were supposed to. They are soundly defeated by their opponents, Ghazis from Afghanistan, and flee the battlefield. Jakin and Lew, who are left behind, try to rouse the regiment by playing the fife and the drum. The 'Fore and Aft' rush back to the fight, but in the first volley of the Afghans, both boys are killed. Inspired by a thirst for revenge, the' Fore and Aft' drives back the Afghans and wins some respect. But the honour for the victory goes to the two drummer boys who died while showing bravery greater than that of the men they served with.
