= A. H. Wheeler =

Indian-owned bookstore company

- A. H. Wheeler company logo
- Company type: Bookstore
- Founded: Allahabad (1877) (now Prayagraj)
- Headquarters: Prayagraj, India
- Key people: Émile Moreau
- Website: www.ahwheeler.com

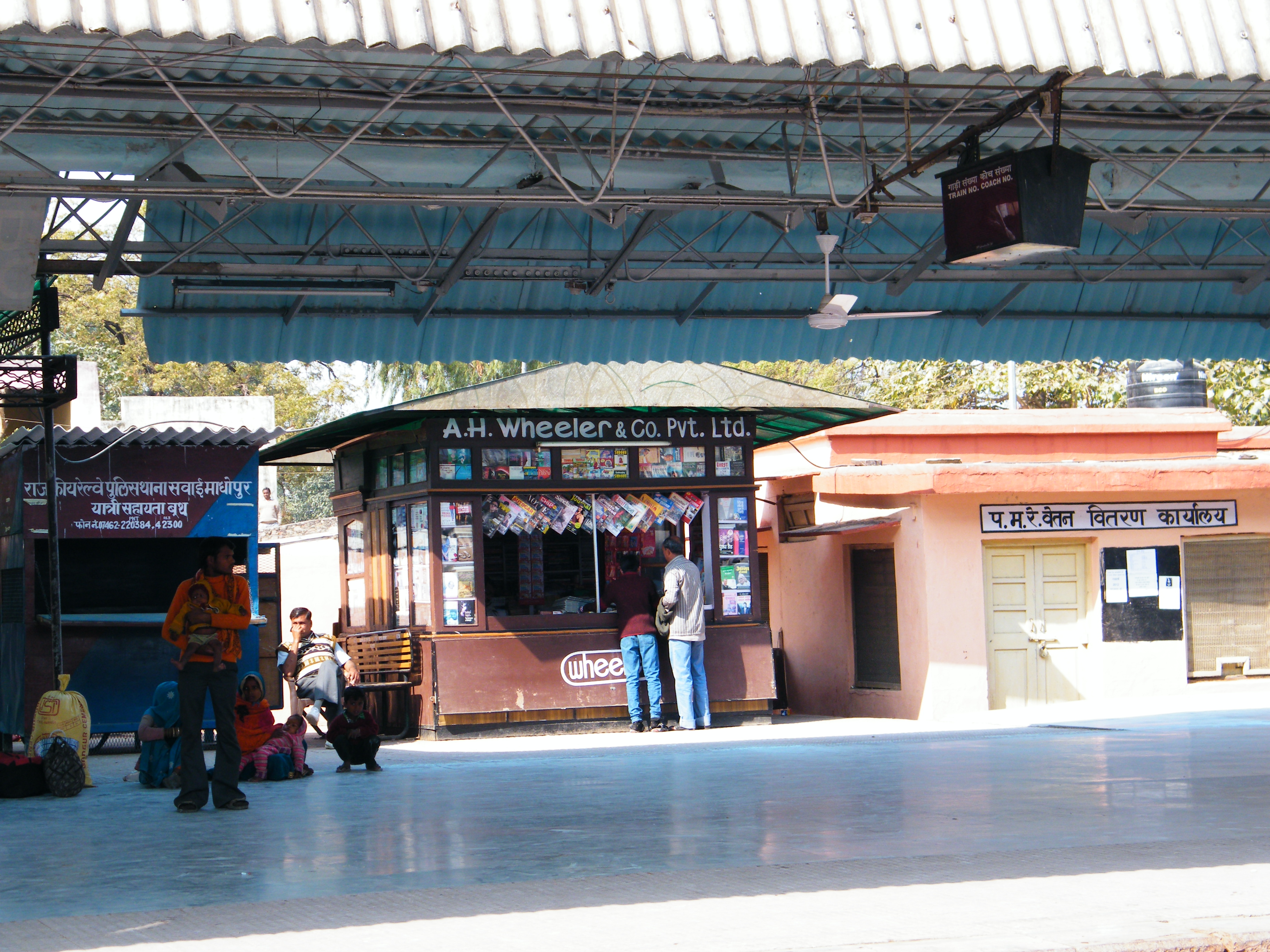
An A.H. Wheeler Bookstore at Sawai Madhopur railway station, Rajasthan

A. H. Wheeler & Co. Pvt. Ltd., commonly known as A. H. Wheeler or simply Wheeler, is an Indian bookstore chain. Co-founded by Émile Moreau, a French businessman in Prayagraj in 1877, it mainly operates from railway stations.

A. H. Wheeler borrowed its name from the then-successful London bookstore and its owner, "Arthur Henry Wheelers", who was also a friend of Emile Moreau and helped him financially.

== History ==
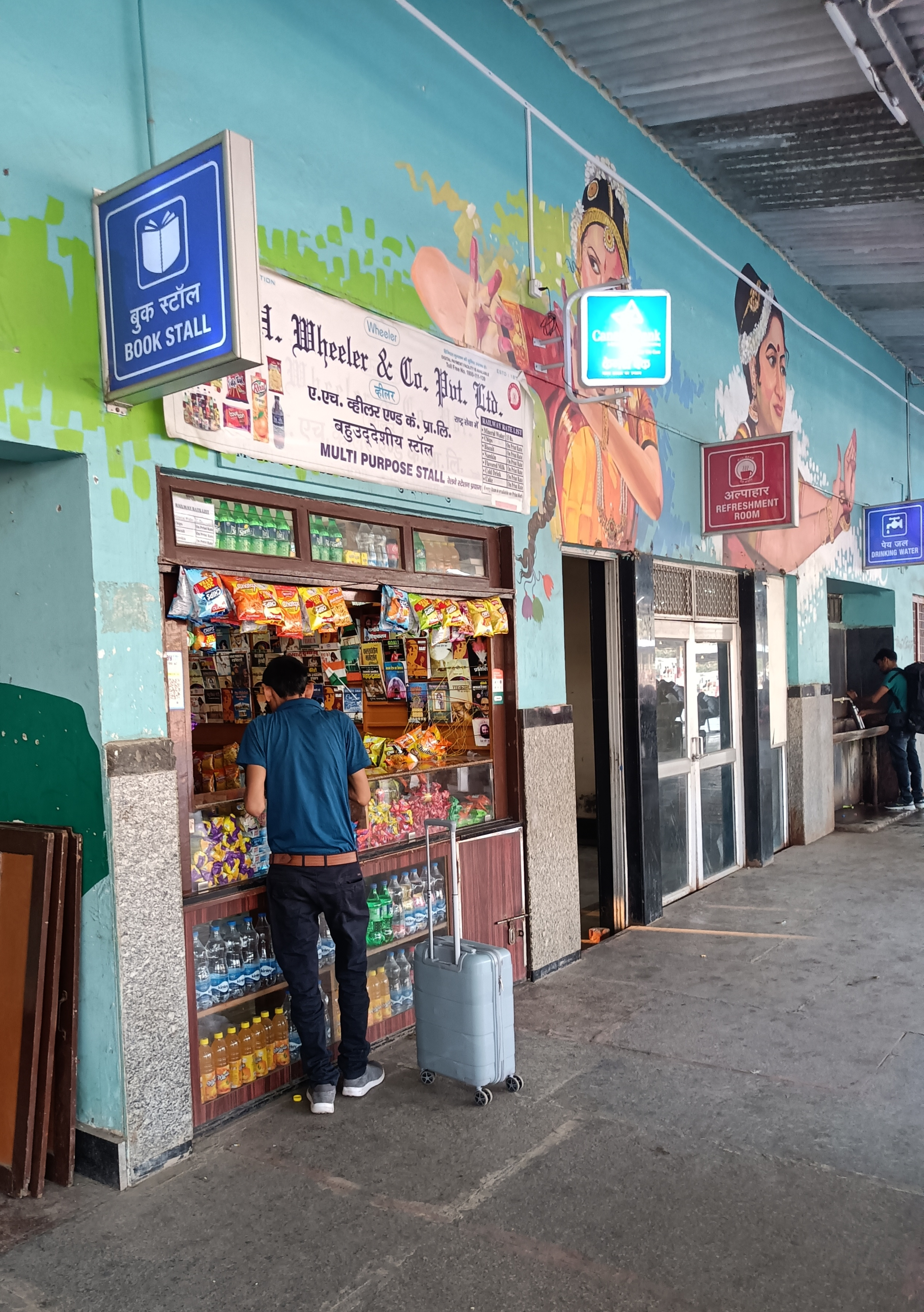
Book stall at Prayag Junction railway station, now converted into a multi-purpose stall.

After its foundation in 1877, the company grew to have stores at railway stations all over India, especially in the north. The first store was opened at Prayagraj railway station in 1877. In 1888 the company began publishing a series of booklets known as the Indian Railway Library.

The Banerjees took over the company in 1950 and it was registered with the Registrar of Companies on 31 October 1953. In 2004 it had bookstores at 258 railway stations all over India. It contributed to about 80% of the revenue earned by the Indian Railways from book sales. Up to 2004, it had a monopoly on selling books at railway stations. it is headquartered in Prayagraj and the distribution network is also managed from there.

A 2004 Indian Railways circular stated: "At present M/s. A.H. Wheeler & Co. is enjoying sole selling rights for running bookstalls at platforms on which this company had been running the same till 01.01.1976. It has now been decided that M/s. A.H. Wheeler & Co. shall not have any sole selling rights henceforth and their rights are brought at par with others. The number of bookstalls held by M/s. A.H. Wheeler & Co. and M/s. Higginbothams Ltd. are at present frozen. Since, the sole selling rights of M/s.A.H. Wheeler & Co. have been withdrawn and their rights have been brought at par with others, the freezing on the holding of stalls by M/s. A.H. Wheeler & Co. and M/s. Higginbothams Ltd. is also removed. In view of the need for decongesting the platform, any fresh allotment of any new bookstall to any category at the stations where railways had frozen the holding of M/s. A.H. Wheeler & Co. and M/s. Higginbothams Ltd. should have to be amply justified before any such decision is taken. The allotment at such stations should be done only with the personal approval of General Manager, irrespective of the type of station."

According to The Financial Express this loss of monopoly was a result of a "New Book policy" being implemented by the Indian Railways. It also carries Wheeler's claims that it was the first Indian company to be granted "total rights of any business" by the British, which it gained in 1937.

The following restrictions have been introduced by the Indian Railways on the nature of books sold on its platforms: "Sale of all types of obscene, scurrilous, smutty, pornographic, offensive or objectionable publications including pirated books is prohibited at all bookstalls. Zonal railways should exercise strict supervision and in case any licensee is found indulging in sale of such literature serious view should be taken including termination of licence."

== Notable publications ==
Plain Tales from the Hills written by Rudyard Kipling were issued as the "Indian Railway Library Series" by Wheeler. These were the first publications of Kipling's collection of stories. These books were sold on railway stations. They cost One rupee, then fifteenth part of a pound. Richard Jaffa considers them "amongst the early paperbacks".
