= Gunga Din =

Poem by Rudyard Kipling

"Gunga Din" (/ˌɡʌŋɡə ˈdiːn/) is an 1890 poem by Rudyard Kipling set in British India. The poem was published alongside "Mandalay" and "Danny Deever" in the collection Barrack-Room Ballads.

The poem is much remembered for its final line "You're a better man than I am, Gunga Din".

== Background ==
Though I've belted you and flayed you,
By the livin' Gawd that made you,
You're a better man than I am, Gunga Din!

— "Gunga Din", lines 82–84
View the full poem on Wikisource

The poem is a rhyming narrative from the point of view of a British soldier in India. Its eponymous character is an Indian water-carrier (a bhishti) who, after the narrator is wounded in battle, saves his life, only to be shot and killed. In the final three lines, the soldier regrets the abuse that he dealt to Din and admits that Din is the better man. The poem was published as part of a set of martial poems called the Barrack-Room Ballads.

In contrast to Kipling's later poem "The White Man's Burden", "Gunga Din" is named after the Indian and portrays him as a heroic character who is not afraid to face danger on the battlefield as he tends to wounded men. The British soldiers who order Din around and beat him for not bringing water to them fast enough are presented as being callous and shallow and ultimately inferior to him.

Although "Din" is frequently pronounced to rhyme with "pin", the rhymes within the poem make it clear that it should be pronounced /ˈdiːn/, to rhyme with "green". T. S. Eliot included the poem in his 1941 collection A Choice of Kipling's Verse. Actor Clifton Crawford was a famous performer of the poem; first doing so in the Broadway musical Three Twins (1908-1909) and later as a monologist.

== Adaptations and references in popular culture ==
In the 1968 film The Party, starring Peter Sellers as the main character Hrundi V Bakshi, there is a beginning segment that references Gunga Din. Hrundi (Sellers) portrays the "Son of Gunga Din".

The poem inspired the 1939 adventure film Gunga Din from RKO Pictures, starring Sam Jaffe in the title role, along with Cary Grant, Victor McLaglen, Douglas Fairbanks Jr., and Joan Fontaine. This movie was remade in 1961 as Sergeants 3, starring the Rat Pack with Sammy Davis Jr. as the Gunga Din character, in which the locale was moved from British-colonial India to the old West. Many elements of the 1939 film were also incorporated into Indiana Jones and the Temple of Doom. The film Three Kings, set during the Gulf War of 1990–1991, also has many resemblances, including a "heist theme", to the film Gunga Din.

Robert Sheckley's short story "Human Man's Burden" (1956, anthologized in Pilgrimage to Earth) alludes to the story by featuring a robotic servant named Gunga Sam, programmed to behave in a manner similar to the stereotypical colonial native servant. While stated to have no soul, he ultimately proves to be no less human and wise than his owner in actions.

In 1964 Duane Hiatt and the group The 3Ds released an album of classic poetry set to music, including Gunga Din, with lyrics almost word for word from Kipling's poem.

Songwriter Jim Croce set the words to music as "The Ballad of Gunga Din" and released it on his 1966 Facets album.

In Carry On Up the Khyber (1968), part of the Carry On series of British comedy films, the rebel warrior chief is called Bungdit Din (Bernard Bresslaw), a parody of Gunga Din. In a scene where he boasts of wiping out the Khyber Pass garrison, the "Khazi of Kalabar" (Kenneth Williams) replies: "You're a better man than me, Bungdit Din."

In 1996, the animated television series Animaniacs featured a segment called "Gunga Dot", in which the "Warner Sister" Dot has a job serving water to the patrons of a resort in a boiling hot desert near Bombay. After growing tired of the constant complaining, she releases the valve on the Warner Bros. Water Tower, which placates the guests and somehow creates the Indian Ocean.

In 1999, the HBO series The Sopranos, episode Pax Soprano references Gunga Din. Livia Soprano whilst living in a retirement community complains to her son that the woman living in the room adjacent to her runs the water all day, remarking that “I’m livin’ next door to Gunga Din”.

In 2015, The Libertines, an English rock band, composed the single "Gunga Din" for their comeback album Anthems for Doomed Youth. The verse "You are a better man than I am" is used throughout the lyrics.

== See also ==
- No Heaven for Gunga Din, 1965 fictional book with a similar theme

== Sources ==
- George Robinson: "Gunga Din" (article on the 1939 Hollywood film). Soldiers of the Queen (Journal of the Victorian Military Society). September 1994.
