= Five Nations =

Five Nations may refer to:

== Arts and entertainment ==
- Five Nations, an area of the fictional Eberron campaign setting for the Dungeons & Dragons role-playing game
  - Five Nations (accessory), a book about the fictional Eberron location
- The Five Nations, a 1903 poetry collection by Rudyard Kipling
- Five Nations, a 2021 real-time strategy video game

== Organizations ==
- The original five nations of the Iroquois Confederacy, a union of Native Americans
- Five Civilized Tribes
- Five Nations Golf Club, a golf course in Belgium

== Rugby ==
- Asian Five Nations, a rugby tournament replaced by Asia Rugby Championship
- Pacific Five Nations, a rugby tournament replaced by World Rugby Pacific Nations Cup
- Five Nations Championship, a UK/Europe rugby tournament replaced by Six Nations Championship
