= Ubique =

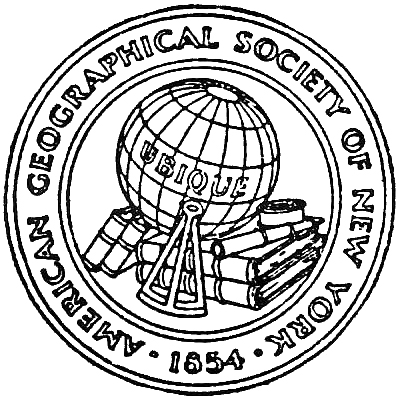
American Geographical Society logo

Ubique is Latin for "everywhere", and may refer to:

- Omnipresence, the property of being present everywhere - commonly used in a religious context.
- Ubique (company).
- Ubique (poem), by Rudyard Kipling.
- Ubique (publication), by the American Geographical Society

and is the motto of:

- Foreign Affairs magazine
- Royal Regiment of Artillery of the British Army
- Corps of Royal Engineers of the British Army
- Royal Canadian Artillery of the Canadian Army
- Royal Australian Artillery of the Australian Army
- Royal Australian Engineers of the Australian Army
- Canadian Military Engineers of the Canadian Army
- Sri Lanka Engineers of the Sri Lanka Army
- South African Artillery
- Royal New Zealand Artillery
- Royal New Zealand Engineers

== See also ==
- Pelagibacter ubique, a ubiquitous marine microorganism
- Ubik, novel by Philip K. Dick
