= Michael Barthorp =

British historian and writer

Michael John Barthorp (died 5 January 2018, aged 90 years) was a British historian and writer, specialising in military history and military uniforms. He lived in Jersey, Channel Islands.

Barthorp attended Wellington College until the end of the Second World War. In September 1945, he joined the Rifle Brigade under universal conscription and was demobilised in 1958. After some time with the Royal Hampshire Territorials, he exchanged for a regular commission in the Northamptonshire Regiment in which his family had served for three generations.

Major Barthorp retired from service in 1968, to become a military historian and writer. He was a member of the Victorian Military Society and contributed to their magazine Soldiers of the Queen.

Predeceased by his wife Penelope, they were survived by two sons and a daughter, grandchildren, and great-grandchildren.

== Bibliography ==
- (1974) The Northamptonshire Regiment (Famous Regiments), Leo Cooper, ISBN 0-8505-2146-7
- (1976) Crater to the Creggan: A History of the Royal Anglian Regiment, 1964-74, Leo Cooper, ISBN 0-8505-2212-9
- (1978) Napoleon's Egyptian Campaigns, 1798–1801, UK: Osprey Publishing, ISBN 978-0-85045-126-9
- (1979) Indian Infantry Regiments, 1860-1914, UK: Osprey Publishing, ISBN 0-85045-307-0
- (1979) To Face the Daring Māoris, Hodder and Stoughton, ISBN 0-3402-2719-2
- (1980) The Zulu War: A Pictorial History, Blandford Press, ISBN 0-7137-1005-5
- (1980) Marlborough's Army 1702-11 UK: Osprey Publishing, ISBN 0-8504-5346-1
- (1982) British Military Uniforms Since 1660, Poole: New Orchard Editions, ISBN 1-85079-009-4
- (1982) British Infantry Uniforms Since 1660, Littlehampton Book Services, ISBN 0-7137-1127-2
- (1982) The Jacobite Rebellions, 1689-1745, London: Osprey Publishing, ISBN 0-85045-432-8
- (1982) The North-West Frontier: British India and Afghanistan, a Pictorial History 1839-194, Blandford Press, ISBN 0-7137-1133-7
- (1984) War on the Nile: Britain, Egypt and the Sudan, 1882-1898, Blandford Press, ISBN 978-0-71371-310-7
- (1984) British Cavalry Uniforms Since 1660, Littlehampton Book Services, ISBN 0-7137-1043-8
- (1987) The Anglo-Boer Wars, Blandford Press, ISBN 0-7137-1658-4
- (1987) The British Army on Campaign (1), 1816-1853, UK: Osprey Publishing, ISBN 0-8504-5793-9
- (1987) The British Army on Campaign (2), 1854-56 : The Crimea, UK: Osprey Publishing, ISBN 0-8504-5827-7
- (1988) The British Army on Campaign (3), 1856-1881, UK: Osprey Publishing, ISBN 0-8504-5835-8
- (1988) The British Army on Campaign (4), 1882–1902, UK: Osprey Publishing, ISBN 0-8504-5849-8
- (1989) The Old Contemptibles, UK: Osprey Publishing, ISBN 978-0-85045-898-5
- (1990) Wellington's Generals, UK: Osprey Publishing, ISBN 978-0-85045-299-0
- (1991) Heroes of the Crimea: The Battles of Balaclava and Inkermann, Blandford Press, ISBN 0-7137-2102-2
- (1994) The British Troops in the Indian Mutiny, 1857–59, UK: Osprey Publishing, ISBN 978-1-85532-369-8
- (1996) The Frontier Ablaze: The North-West Frontier Rising, 1897-98, Windrow & Greene, ISBN 1-8591-5023-3
- (2000) Queen Victoria's Commanders, UK: Osprey Publishing, ISBN 978-1-84176-054-4
- (2002) The Zulu War: Isandhlwana to Ulundi, Weidenfeld & Nicolson, ISBN 0-3043-6270-0
- (2002) Afghan Wars: and the North-West Frontier 1839-1947, Cassell, ISBN 0-3043-6294-8
- (2002) Slogging Over Africa: The Boer Wars 1815-1902, Cassell, ISBN 0-3043-6293-X
