= Danny Deever =

Poem by Rudyard Kipling

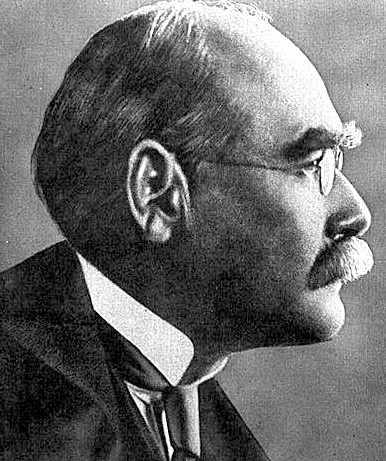
Rudyard Kipling

"Danny Deever" is an 1890 poem by Rudyard Kipling, one of the first of the Barrack-Room Ballads. It received wide critical and popular acclaim, and is often regarded as one of the most significant pieces of Kipling's early verse. The poem, a ballad, describes the execution of a British soldier in India for murder. His execution is viewed by his regiment, paraded to watch it, and the poem is composed of the comments they exchange as they see him hanged.

== Background and origins ==
Kipling had worked as a journalist in northern British India during the 1880s, initially for the Civil and Military Gazette in Lahore and later for The Pioneer in Allahabad. In 1886, the Gazette was taken over by a new editor, who began publishing Kipling's short stories and poetry to "put some sparkle" into the paper. Later that year, a first volume of the poems was published as Departmental Ditties, and a volume of short stories, Plain Tales from the Hills, followed in 1887. He continued to write at a rapid rate, publishing in a number of different papers and, in 1888, the Indian Railway Library series published five new volumes of short stories plus a novel.

A growing theme in these stories was Army life, particularly among working-class private soldiers rather than the middle-class young officers who had appeared in the pre-1887 stories. Starting with The Three Musketeers (March 1887, then Plain Tales), he began a series with a recurring trio of privates, Learoyd, Mulvaney and Ortheris, who described the adventures of barracks life in exaggerated Yorkshire, Irish, and Cockney accents. His focus on the soldier as an individual, rather than a romanticised caricature, was unusual for the period; Charles Carrington, his official biographer, argued that "you will find no treatment of the English soldier on any adequate scale between Shakespeare and Kipling". There is some dispute about how well Kipling knew actual soldiers; Carrington suggested he mainly socialised with officers and drew his characters from ex-servicemen he had known in his schooldays, while David Gilmour recorded that he visited barracks and canteens at Mian Mir as the guest of the NCOs, taking a particular interest in slang and soldier's songs.

In early 1889, Kipling left the Pioneer, and decided to return to England to further his literary career. After a voyage through the Far East and across North America, he arrived in England that October. Here, his first new poetry was published (under a pseudonym, "Yussuf") in Macmillan's Magazine in November and December 1889 - one of these, The Ballad of East and West, would become one of his best known works - followed by a series of pieces submitted to William Henley's Scots Observer. The second of these, Danny Deever, was published on 22 February 1890 and rapidly followed by a series of others which would become known as the Barrack-Room Ballads.

In 1889, prior to leaving India, Kipling had offered a series of twelve "soldier poems" to a publisher under the name Barrack-Room Ballads, but it is not known which poems were contained in this. Edmonia Hill, a friend who travelled with him on the voyage to America, wrote in her diary that after leaving Burma he announced "I'll write some Tommy Atkins ballads". The majority of the series are assumed to have been written in early 1890.

The poem describes the execution of a soldier for murder, and it has been suggested that it was inspired in part by the execution of Private Flaxman of the Leicestershire Regiment, at Lucknow in 1887. A number of details of this execution correspond to the occasion described by Kipling in the poem, and he later used a story similar to that of Flaxman's as a basis for the story Black Jack. A number of Kipling's short stories and poems of the period can be identified as having their origins in a wide range of sources, ranging from contemporary reports of fighting in Burma to passages from Daniel Deronda.

== Summary ==
The form is a dialogue, between a young and inexperienced soldier (or soldiers; he is given as "Files-on-Parade", suggesting a group) and a more experienced and older NCO ("the Colour-Sergeant"). The setting is an execution, generally presumed to be somewhere in India; a soldier, one Danny Deever, has been tried and sentenced to death for murdering a fellow soldier in his sleep, and his battalion is paraded to witness the hanging. This procedure strengthened discipline in the unit, by a process of deterrence, and helped inure inexperienced soldiers to the sight of death.

The young soldier is unaware of what is happening, at first – he asks why the bugles are blowing, and why the Sergeant looks so pale, but is told that Deever is being hanged, and that the regiment is drawn up in "[h]ollow square" to see it. He presses the Sergeant further, in the second verse – why are people breathing so hard? why does a man in the front-rank collapse? These signs of the effect that watching the hanging has upon the men of the regiment are explained away by the Sergeant as being due to the cold weather or the bright sun. The voice is reassuring, keeping the young soldier calm in the sight of death, just as the Sergeant will calm him with his voice in combat. In the third verse, Files thinks of Deever, saying that he slept alongside him, and drank with him, but the Sergeant reminds him that Deever is now alone, that he sleeps "out an' far to-night", and reminds the soldier of the magnitude of Deever's crime –

For 'e shot a comrade sleepin'—you must look 'im in the face;
Nine 'undred of 'is county an' the Regiment's disgrace,

— lines 22-23

(Nine hundred was roughly the number of men in a single infantry battalion, and as regiments were formed on local lines, most would have been from the same county; it is thus emphasised that his crime is a black mark against both the regiment, as a whole, and against his comrades). The fourth verse comes to the hanging; Files sees the body against the sun, and then feels his soul as it "whimpers" overhead; the term reflects a shudder in the ranks as they watch Deever die. Finally, the Sergeant moves the men away; though it is not directly mentioned in the poem, they would be marched past the corpse on the gallows – reflecting that the recruits are shaking after their ordeal, and that "they'll want their beer to-day".

== Structure ==
The poem is composed of four eight-line verses, containing a dialogue between two (or three) voices:

"What are the bugles blowin' for?" said Files-on-Parade.
"To turn you out, to turn you out", the Colour-Sergeant said.
"What makes you look so white, so white?" said Files-on-Parade.
"I'm dreadin' what I've got to watch," the Colour-Sergeant said.
For they're hangin' Danny Deever, you can hear the Dead March play,
The Regiment's in 'ollow square—they're hangin' him to-day;
They've taken of his buttons off an' cut his stripes away,
An' they're hangin' Danny Deever in the mornin'.

— Stanza 1 (lines 1-8)

The four verses each consist of two questions asked by "Files" and answered by the Sergeant- a call-and-response form – and then another four lines of the Sergeant explaining, as above. In some interpretations, the second four lines are taken to be spoken by a third voice, another "file-on-parade". Both the poem's rhythm and its rhyme scheme reinforce the idea of drilling infantry by giving the effect of feet marching generally but not perfectly in unison: Although the poem's overall meter is iambic, each line in the verses and, to the slightly lesser extent, the chorus features syllables with additional grammatical and phonetic emphasis that fit the rhythm of the "left, left, left right left" marching cadence. The first four lines always end with the same word, and the last four feature an aaab rhyme scheme with slightly lighter syllables that force the pace into a brisk march despite its somber mood (cf. the text of the poem's final chorus). As the scholar Henry W. Wells put it in 1943, Kipling's chorus with "tripping anapaests" contrasts with the "grave iambs" of the verses, is powerfully expressive of the "masterly irony" in the ballad. These parallel, Wells writes, the stark contrast between the heaviness of the soldiers' hearts with the briskness of "military quick-step". T. S. Eliot noted the imperfect rhyme scheme – parade and said do not quite rhyme – as strongly contributing to this effect, with the slight interruption supporting the feel of a large number of men marching together, not quite in harmony.

== Critical reaction ==
Danny Deever is often seen as one of Kipling's most powerful early works, and was greeted with acclaim when first published. David Masson, a professor of literature at the University of Edinburgh, is often reported (perhaps apocryphally) to have waved the magazine in which it appeared at his students, crying "Here's literature! Here's literature at last!". W. E. Henley, the editor of the Scots Observer, is even said to have danced on his wooden leg when he first received the text.

The poem was later commented on by the poet William Butler Yeats, who noted that "[Kipling] interests a critical audience today by the grotesque tragedy of Danny Deever". Another poet, T. S. Eliot, called the poem "technically (as well as in content) remarkable", holding it up as one of the best of Kipling's ballads. He included the poem in his 1941 collection A Choice of Kipling's Verse and offered analysis of the poem in the introduction. Eliot described the poem's combination of "heavy beat and variation of page" as remarkable both technically and in content. He concluded that Danny Deever was "a barrack-room ballad which somehow attains the intensity of poetry".

Both Yeats and Eliot were writing shortly after Kipling's death, in 1936 and 1941, when critical opinion of his poetry was at a low point; both, nonetheless, drew out Danny Deever for attention as a significant work. Discussing that low critical opinion in a 1942 essay, George Orwell described Danny Deever as an example of Kipling "at his worst, and also his most vital ... almost a shameful pleasure, like the taste for cheap sweets that some people secretly carry into middle life". He felt the work was an example of what he described as "good bad poetry"; verse which is essentially vulgar, yet undeniably seductive and "a sign of the emotional overlap between the intellectual and the ordinary man."

== Music ==
The Barrack-Room Ballads, as the name suggests, are songs of soldiers. Written by Kipling, they share a form and a style with traditional Army songs. Kipling was one of the first to pay attention to these works; Charles Carrington noted that in contrast to the songs of sailors, "no-one had thought of collecting genuine soldiers' songs, and when Kipling wrote in this traditional style it was not recognised as traditional". Kipling himself was fond of singing his poetry, of writing it to fit the rhythm of a particular tune. In this specific case, the musical source has been suggested as the Army's "grotesque bawdy song" Barnacle Bill the Sailor, but it is possible that some other popular tune of the period was used.

However, the ballads were not published with any music, and though they were quickly adapted to be sung, new musical settings were written; a musical setting by Walter Damrosch was described as "Teddy Roosevelt's favourite song", and is sometimes encountered on its own as a tune entitled They're Hanging Danny Deever in the Morning. To date, at least a dozen published recordings are known, made from 1893 to 1985.

The tune "They're Hanging Danny Deever in the Morning" (Walter Damrosch) was played from the Campanile at UC Berkeley at the end of the last day of classes for the Spring Semester of 1930, and has been repeated every year since, with a certain ironic humour, at the beginning of final exams week, making it one of the oldest campus traditions.

Percy Grainger composed a setting of Danny Deever for male chorus and orchestra.

== See also ==
- 1892 in poetry
- 1892 in literature
