= Never the Twain Shall Meet =

"Never the twain shall meet" is a line in the Rudyard Kipling poem The Ballad of East and West.

Never the Twain Shall Meet is the title of two films:

- Never the Twain Shall Meet (1925 film), a silent film
- Never the Twain Shall Meet (1931 film), a talking remake of the earlier film
