= The Seven Seas (poetry collection) =

1896 book of poetry by Rudyard Kipling

The Seven Seas is a book of poetry by Rudyard Kipling published 1896. Poems include "Hymn Before Action", "In the Neolithic Age", "The Lost Legion", "The Mary Gloster", and "McAndrew's Hymn".
