= Ali Mirdrekvandi =

Ali Mirdrekvandi Dinani علی میردریکوندی
- Born: 1916–1918; Rikhan, Lorestan, Iran
- Occupation: Writer
- Writing career
- Notable work: No Heaven for Gunga Din

Ali Mirdrekvandi (also called Gunga Din), (Persian: علی میردریکوندی) is an Iranian author, known for authoring No Heaven for Gunga Din, a fable, and Noorafkan (trans. Irradiant), a popular epic, both written in broken English in the mid-20th century.

== Life and works ==
Mirdrekvandi wrote The British and American Officer's Book while working at the officer's mess in Tehran during World War II, which was given to his mentor Hemming (then a British officer). Hemming's last contact with Mirdrekvandi was in 1949. At the time of publication the author's history and current circumstances were unknown. Some sources asserted that Mirdrekvandi was fictional, and that the story was actually written by Hemming or Zaehner, which is unlikely given the linguistic structure of the book.

On publication of the book in 1965 the Iranian press conducted a public search for Mirdrekvandi, characterized as a "missing millionaire". His brother, a former classmate, and others who recalled him were found, they provided additional information that was he born some time in 1916–1918 in a village in Lorestan Province in western Iran. According to one source, he was raised by his grandfather after his parents were "taken away by soldiers" and never heard of again. This would have been around the time the Pahlavi dynasty crushed a rebellion by the nomadic Lurs of Lorestan. Young Ali's talents were noted and he was sent to a school for sons of tribal leaders, "not to learn banditry and robbery." He reportedly left school after a dispute with the son of the school director, and was working for a railway when British and Soviet forces entered Iran at the beginning of World War II.

It was later discovered that Derikvandi had been living in impoverished circumstances in the town of Borujerd, where he was notable for reading many English language books. He is reported to have written several other stories, which he burned after reading them to fellow homeless people, and as having died on November 26, 1964, just prior to the publication of his book. He had expected his British and American Officer's Book would soon be published but suffered from drug addiction and memory loss. One other unpublished manuscript by Derikvandi remains in Hemming's archives.

== Sources ==
- Mirdrekvandi, Ali (1965). No Heaven for Gunga Din. E. P. Dutton & Company. LCCN 65023748. Edited and introduction by John Hemming, foreword by Professor R. C. Zaehner.
- Motamedi-Fraser, Mariam (November 2013). "Locating the Archive: The Search for 'Nurafkan'". Ibraaz.
- Nematpour, Gholamreza (2013). No Heaven For Gunga Din — Baraye Gungadin Behesht Nist. In Persian with English subtitles.
- Zaehner, R. C. (1965). "Zoroastrian Survivals in Iranian Folklore" (PDF). Iran. 3. British Institute of Persian Studies: 87–96. doi:10.2307/4299562. JSTOR 4299562.
- Zaehner, R. C. (1992). "Zoroastrian Survivals in Iranian Folklore II" (PDF). Iran. 30. British Institute of Persian Studies: 65–75. doi:10.2307/4299870. JSTOR 4299870. With introduction by P. G. Kreyenbroek.
