= A Choice of Kipling's Verse =

T. S. Eliot book

A Choice of Kipling's Verse, made by T. S. Eliot, with an essay on Rudyard Kipling is a book first published in December 1941 (by Faber and Faber in UK, and by Charles Scribner's Sons in U.S.A.). It is in two parts. The first part is an essay by American-born British poet T. S. Eliot (1888–1965), in which he discusses the nature and stature of British poet Rudyard Kipling (1865–1936). The second part consists of Eliot's selection from Kipling's poems.

A Choice of Kipling's Verse was republished in 1963.

== Critical reception ==
A Choice of Kipling's Verse rapidly attracted critical attention, both supportive and hostile, on both sides of the Atlantic.

W. J. Turner said that "Mr. Eliot's essay is an admirable example of the finest type of criticism. He succeeds in making us look at his subject's work with freshly opened eyes and he is at once sober, illuminating and sound".

George Orwell took the opportunity to write an extended political essay, which included his own appraisal of Kipling as man and poet. Orwell condemned Kipling for his imperialism, but defended him from charges of fascism which had recently been raised against him. He disliked Kipling's use of the vernacular. He summed up Kipling as a "good bad poet", where a "good bad poem is a graceful monument to the obvious."

Mulk Raj Anand believed that Eliot had over-praised Kipling's critical thought.

A pseudonymous reviewer in New English Weekly wrote, "Mr. Eliot offers an important defense of Kipling's imperialism".

English poet Norman Nicholson asserted his right as one of the presumed intended audience to comment, and gave his own, somewhat equivocal, opinion on Kipling.

Marjorie Farber praised Eliot for his "valuable distinction between ballad-makers and poetry-makers", and for his clearing away of some of the prejudices against Kipling; she regretted Eliot's failure to acknowledge Kipling's "pleasure in hating".

Louise Bogan wrote, "It is [...] strange to see [Eliot] bending the subtle resources of his intelligence in a hopeless cause" (i.e. that of rehabilitating Kipling).

William Rose Benét wrote (ambiguously), "[Eliot] is not a genius, like Kipling, but his is a subtle and interesting mind".

Lionel Trilling placed Kipling's book in a larger, political and literary context in The Nation (in copyright, and not readable online, but readable in his The Liberal Imagination). His summary response:

Kipling, then, must be taken as a poet. Taken so, he will scarcely rank very high, although much must be said in his praise. ... you can read through the bulky Inclusive Edition of his verse, on which Mr. Eliot's selection is based, and be neither wearied, in part because you will not have been involved, nor uninterested, because Kipling was a man of great gifts...but when you have done you will be less inclined to condemn than to pity.

W. H. Auden wrote a two-page review for The New Republic (in copyright, and not readable online), which Mildred Martin summarized as "Little on Eliot, chiefly in praise of Kipling".

Carl T. Naumburg called Eliot's choice of poems "a scholarly and intelligently chosen anthology" and "an altogether excellent selection"; and said that "it is obvious that the essay not the anthology is of importance", and that the essay "will always be regarded as a work of outstanding importance in the field of Kiplingiana".

In 2008, Roger Kimball described Eliot's essay as "partly, but only partly, an effort at rehabilitation". "[H]is essay turns on a distinction between 'verse' – at which Kipling is said to excel – and 'poetry,' which, says Eliot, he approaches but rarely and then only by accident." Kimball summarised the essay as "sensitive, intelligent, and a subtle masterpiece of deflation", and also said that "Eliot wants to preserve a place for Kipling, but he also wants to put him in his place – not, we are meant to understand, the same (and higher) place occupied by Eliot himself".

== The book ==
=== Eliot's essay ===
Eliot's essay occupies 32 pages, and is dated 26 September 1941. It is divided into two sections. (Numerical superscripts in the following summary refer to page numbers in the 1963 edition.)

Eliot doubted whether anyone could make the most of two such different forms of expression as poetry and imaginative prose. He asserted that for Kipling neither form could be judged individually, and that he was the inventor of a mixed form.^{5} He called Kipling a ballad-maker, someone whose poems could be understood at first hearing, so that his poems had to be defended against the charge of excessive lucidity, not that of obscurity; and against the charge of being jingles.^{6,9} He singled out "Danny Deever" as remarkable in both technique and content.^{11-12} He contrasted the dramatic monologues "McAndrew's Hymn" and "The 'Mary Gloster'", which he considered to belong together.^{13-14} He noted the "important influence of Biblical imagery and the Authorised Version language upon [Kipling's] writing", and suggested that Kipling was both a great epigram writer and (on the strength of "Recessional") a great hymn writer.^{16}

Eliot found it impossible to fit Kipling's poems into one or another distinct class. The later poems are more diverse than the early. Neither "development" nor "experimentation" seems the right description. The critical tools which Eliot was accustomed to use did not seem to work.^{16-17} He said that "most of us" (i.e. poets) were interested in form for its own sake, and with musical structure in poetry, leaving any deeper meaning to emerge from a lower level; in contrast to Kipling, whose poems were designed to elicit the same response from all readers.^{18} Eliot defended himself against the hypothetical charge that he had been briefed in the cause of some hopelessly second-rate writer. He asserted that Kipling "knew something of the things which are underneath, and of the things which are beyond the frontier". He next said, "I have not explained Kipling's verse nor the permanent effect it can have on you. It will help if I can keep him out of the wrong pigeon-holes".^{19-20} He then quoted in full one poem, "The Fabulists" (1914-1918),^{(ws)} (Note: The dates are those of the Great War of 1914-18.) which he said showed Kipling's integrity of purpose and which he thought would have more effect in the essay than in the body of the book.^{21-22}

Eliot opened the second part of his essay by restating his original proposition: that Kipling's prose and verse have to be considered together; while calling him "the most inscrutable of authors" and "a writer impossible wholly to understand and quite impossible to believe".^{22} He wondered whether Kipling's world-view had been shaped by his upbringing in India under the British Raj - and argued that one of his defining features was his acceptance of all faiths and beliefs, as exemplified in his novel Kim.^{23-24} He compared Kipling to Dryden, another English writer who put politics into verse: "[T]he two men had much in common. Both were masters of phrase, both employed rather simple rhythms with adroit variations. [...] [T]hey were both classical rather than romantic poets".^{25-26} For both men, wisdom was more important than inspiration, and the world about them than their own feelings. Nevertheless, Eliot did not wish to overstress the likeness, and recognised the differences.^{26}

Kipling thought his verse and prose as both being for a public purpose. Eliot warned against taking Kipling out of his time, and against exaggerating the importance of a particular piece or phrase which a reader might dislike. He considered that Edward Shanks had missed the point when he called the poem "Loot" ^{(ws)} "detestable". In Kipling's military poems, he had tried to describe the soldier (serving or discharged, both unappreciated at home), and not to idealise him. He was exasperated both by sentimentalism and by depreciation and neglect.^{26-27}

Eliot attributed Kipling's development to the time he had spent in India; on travel and in America; and finally settled in Sussex. Kipling had a firm belief in the British Empire and what he thought it should be, while recognising its faults. He was more interested in individuals than in man in the mass. Eliot found Kipling in some way alien, as if from another planet. People who are too clever are distrusted. He compared Kipling with another outsider, the 19th century British politician Benjamin Disraeli.^{27-28}

Kipling had the misfortune of early success, so that critics judged him by his early work and did not revise their opinions to take account of the later.^{28} He had been called both a Tory (for his content) and a journalist (for his style); in neither case as a compliment. Eliot disagreed, except insofar as those terms could be considered honourable. He dismissed the charge that Kipling believed in racial superiority. Rather, he believed that the British had a natural aptitude to rule and to rule well. He admired people from all races; as can be seen from Kim, which Eliot called "his maturest work on India, and his greatest book". A problem with Kipling was that he expressed unpopular ideas in a popular style. So saying, Eliot concluded his discussion of Kipling's early imperialism. Kipling was not doctrinaire and did not have a programme; for which Eliot rated him favourably over H. G. Wells.^{29-30}

Kipling's middle years are marked by "the development of the imperial imagination into the historical imagination", to which his settling in Sussex must have contributed. He was humble enough to submit to his surroundings, and had the fresh vision of a stranger. There is more than one kind of "historical imagination". One gives life to abstractions, and the larger picture. Another implies a whole civilisation from a single individual. Kipling's imagination was of the second kind.^{30-31} The historical imagination can convey the vast extent of time, or the nearness of the past, or both. Eliot pointed to Puck of Pook's Hill and Rewards and Fairies as doing both. Kipling was a different kind of regional writer from Thomas Hardy; and not just in that Kipling was chronicling a Sussex he wished to preserve and Hardy the decay of a Dorset he had known from boyhood. Kipling did not write about Sussex because he had run out of foreign and imperial material or because the public demand for it had passed, nor because he was a chameleon who took his colour from his surroundings. He was "discovering and reclaiming a lost inheritance".^{32-33} The most important thing in Kipling's Sussex stories was his vision of "the people of the soil"; not in a Christian but more in a pagan sense, not as a programme for agrarian reform, but as a counterbalance to materialism and industrialism. Eliot noted the contrast in "The Wish House" (a short story in the 1926 collection Debits and Credits) between its supernatural elements and its sordid realism; he found both it and its two accompanying poems "hard and obscure". Kipling had become more than a mere story teller, and more than the man who had felt it his duty to tell his countrymen things they refused to see. He must have known that his own fame and reputation would get in the way of all but a few people understanding his late parables and the skill with which they were constructed; both in his time and afterwards.^{33-34}

Kipling wrote "verse" rather than "poetry" (two terms which Eliot acknowledged he was using loosely). He handled a wide variety of stanza and metre with perfect competence, but produced no revolution in form. The musical interest of his verse - taken as a whole - is subordinated to its meaning, and that differentiates it from poetry. Doing otherwise would have interfered with his intention. Eliot did not imply a value judgment. Kipling did not write verse because he could not write poetry; he wrote verse because it does something which poetry cannot do. He was a great verse writer. Eliot chose not to name any other famous poets who might be called great verse writers; but declared that Kipling's position in that latter class was not only high but unique.^{34-36}

Eliot concluded by saying that if his essay assisted the reader to approach Kipling with a fresh mind, it would have served its purpose.^{36}

=== Eliot's selection of poems ===
Eliot did not attempt to define a critical consensus on the merits of any of Kipling's poems. He chose not to include anything which he considered juvenilia. His selection expresses the personal opinion of one major poet on another, and deserves attention for that reason.

The titles in the following list are those used by Eliot. They sometimes differ in minor ways from those chosen by Kipling. Dates are included only where Eliot included them. As superscripts:

- ^{(ws)} links to the text in Wikisource of a poem which has no Wikipedia article;
- ^{[Poem]} links to a reputable online source for the text of a poem not in Wikisource;
- ^{(na)} means that no reputable source has been found.

This list is complete

- "L'Envoi" (Departmental Ditties) ^{(ws)}
- "Dedication" from Barrack-Room Ballads ^{(ws)}
- "Sestina of the Tramp-Royal" (1896) ^{(ws)} (Note: A sestina is a fixed verse form dating from the 12th century. Kipling's "tramp-royal" is a tramp or vagrant.)
- "The Greek National Anthem" (1918) ^{{ws)} (Note: A translation of 7 of the 158 stanzas of "Hymn to Liberty" (1823) by Dionýsios Solomós.)
- "The Broken Men" (1902) ^{(ws)}
- "Gethsemane" (1914–18) ^{(ws)} (Note: The Garden of Gethsemane was where Christ prayed, and His disciples slept, before His arrest, trial and crucifixion. Eliot said that he did not think that he understood the poem.)
- "The Song of the Banjo" (1894) ^{(ws)}
- "The Pro-Consuls" ^{(ws)}
- "McAndrew's Hymn" (1893)
- "The Mary Gloster" (1894)
- "The Ballad of the Bolivar" (1890) ^{(ws)} (Note: Bolivar is a fictional ship, perhaps named after Simón Bolívar El Libertador.)
- "A Song in Storm" (1914–18)
- "The Last Chantey" (1892) ^{(ws)} (Note: A chantey is a sailors' work song.)
- "The Long Trail"
- "Ave Imperatrix!" ^{(ws)} (Note: "Ave Imperatrix!" is Latin for "Hail, Empress!"; in context, Victoria, Queen and Empress.)
- "A Song of the English" (1893) ^{(ws)}
- "The Gipsy Trail" ^{(ws)}
- "Our Lady of the Snows" (1897) ^{(ws)} (Note: The poem "Our Lady of the Snows" is subtitled "Canadian Preferential Tariff, 1897". This appears to relate to an element of the Canadian budget of 1897 called "British preference", which was intended to grant lower duties on imports into Canada from the United Kingdom and from some of its colonies – only. The intention failed at first, because it conflicted with obligations by the United Kingdom to other countries under existing treaties. The United Kingdom was persuaded to denounce those treaties at the 1897 Colonial Conference, allowing the Canadian intention to take effect.) (Note: "Our Lady of the Snows" is a title of the Virgin Mary, but its meaning in this poem is for the reader to decide.)
- "The Irish Guards" (1918) ^{(ws)} (Note: The Irish Guards are a regiment of foot guards in the British Army.)
- "The Settler" (1903) ^{(ws)}
- "Sussex" (1902) ^{(ws)} (Note: Kipling's poem "Sussex" was, allegedly, the inspiration for the song "Sussex by the Sea".)
- "The Vampire" (1897) ^{(ws)}
- "When Earth's Last Picture Is Painted" (1892) ^{(ws)}
- "The Ballad of East and West" (1889)
- "Gehazi" (1915) ^{(ws)} (Note: Gehazi was a Biblical figure cursed by the prophet Elisha with leprosy for abusing his power. Eliot said that the poem was inspired by the Marconi scandals.)
- "Et Dona Ferentes" (1896) ^{(ws)} (Note: ""Et Dona Ferentes" is from the proverbial phrase Timeo Danaos et dona ferentes ("Beware of Greeks bearing gifts"), and alludes to the Trojan Horse.)
- "The Holy War" (1917) (Note: "The Holy War" is preceded by a quotation from The Holy War by John Bunyan (1628-1688); and is partially about him.)
- "France" (1913)
- "The Bell Buoy" (1896)
- "Mesopotamia" (1917) (Note: Mesopotamia is an historical region between the Tigris and Euphrates rivers, in modern days roughly corresponding to most of Iraq plus Kuwait, the eastern parts of Syria, Southeastern Turkey, and regions along the Turkish-Syrian and Iran–Iraq borders.)
- "The Islanders" (1902) ^{(ws)}
- "The Veterans"
- "The Dykes" (1902) ^{(ws)} (Note: A dyke is an earthen defence against waters; see levee.)
- "The White Man's Burden" (1899)
- "Hymn Before Action" (1896) ^{(ws)}
- "Recessional" (1897)
- "'For All We Have and Are'" (1914) ^{(ws)}
- "The Benefactors" ^{(ws)}
- "The Craftsman"
- "Samuel Pepys" (1933) ^{(na)} (Note: Samuel Pepys (1633-1703), famous not only as a diarist but also for his part in turning the Royal Navy into a professional fighting organisation.)
- "'When 'Omer Smote 'Is Bloomin' Lyre'" (Note: 'Omer is the ancient Greek epic poet Homer. "Bloomin'" is a euphemism for the British expletive intensifier "bloody". A lyre is a string instrument like a small harp, dating back to Greek antiquity.)
- "Tomlinson" (1891) ^{(ws)}
- "The Last Rhyme of True Thomas" (1893) ^{(ws)} (Note: "True Thomas" is Thomas the Rhymer.)
- "The Sons of Martha" (1907) ^{(ws)} (Note: In Christian tradition, Martha is a symbol of the active, and her sister Mary of the contemplative, life. See Jesus at the home of Martha and Mary.)
- "Epitaphs of the War" (1914–18) ^{(ws)}
- "'Bobs'" (1898) ^{(ws)} (Note: "Bobs" was an affectionate nickname for Frederick Roberts, 1st Earl Roberts (1832-1914). He was a successful army officer in British India, and in 1895 was made Commander-in-Chief of British forces in Ireland. In 1897, he published his memoirs, Forty-one Years in India: from Subaltern to Commander-in-chief. In 1899 (i.e. after the date of the poem), he was given overall command of the British forces in South Africa during the Second Boer War.)
- "Danny Deever"
- "Tommy"
- "'Fuzzy-Wuzzy'"
- "Screw-Guns" ^{(ws)} (Note: "Screw-gun" was a nickname for the RML 2.5-inch Mountain Gun, which could be broken down into four parts for easier transport in rough country.)
- "Gunga Din"
- "The Widow at Windsor"
- "Belts" ^{(ws)} (Note: "Belts" is about the use of belts as impromptu weapons in hand-to-hand fighting, especially during inter-unit military brawls.)
- "The Young British Soldier" ^{(ws)}
- "Mandalay"
- "Troopin'" ^{(ws)}
- "The Widow's Party" ^{(ws)} (Note: "The Widow" was Queen Victoria.)
- "Gentlemen-Rankers"
- "Private Ortheris's Song" ^{(ws, "My girl she gave me the go onst")} (Note: For Private Ortheris, see Learoyd, Mulvaney and Ortheris.)
- "Shillin' a Day" ^{(ws)}
- "'Back to the Army Again'" ^{(ws)}
- "'Birds of Prey' March" ^{(ws)}
- "'Soldier an' Sailor Too'" ^{(ws)} (Note: A "soldier and sailor too" is a Royal Marine.)
- "Sappers" ^{(ws)} (Note: A "sapper" is a soldier in the Royal Engineers.)
- "That Day" ^{(ws)}
- "'The Men that Fought at Minden'" ^{(ws)} (Note: Battle of Minden (1759), during the Seven Years' War, in which an Anglo-German army decisively defeated a French army.)
- "The Ladies" ^{(ws)}
- "'Follow Me 'Ome'" ^{(ws)}
- "The Sergeant's Weddin'" ^{(ws)}
- "The 'Eathen" ^{(ws)}
- "'For to Admire'" ^{(ws)}
- "The Absent-Minded Beggar"
- "Chant-Pagan" ^{(ws)}
- "Boots"
- "The Married Man" ^{(ws)}
- "Stellenbosch" ^{(ws)} (Note: Stellenbosch is a town in the Western Cape province of South Africa. During the Second Boer War (1899-1902), it was a British military base. Officers who had failed to distinguish themselves in battle were posted there.)
- "Piet" ^{(ws)} (Note: "Piet" was a British nickname for a Boer soldier, from the common Afrikaans given name.)
- "Ubique"
- "The Return" ^{(ws)}
- "Cities and Thrones and Powers" ^{(ws)}
- "The Recall" ^{(ws)}
- "Puck's Song"
- "The Way Through the Woods" ^{(ws)}
- "A Three-Part Song"
- "The Run of the Downs" (Note: The North and South Downs are rolling chalk hills in southeastern England.)
- "Sir Richard's Song (A.D. 1066)"
- "A Tree Song (A.D. 1200)"
- "A Charm" ^{(ws)}
- "Chapter Headings" (Note: The "Chapter Headings" are the introductory verses to some of the short stories in Kipling's 1888 collection Plain Tales from the Hills.^{(ws)})
- "Cold Iron" ^{(ws)}
- "'My New-Cut Ashlar'" (Note: Ashlar is finely dressed masonry.)
- "Non Nobis Domine!" (Note: "Non nobis Domine" ("Not unto us, O Lord") is a mediaeval Latin hymn used as a prayer of thanksgiving and expression of humility.)
- "The Waster" (1930)
- "Harp Song of the Dane Women"
- "A St. Helena Lullaby" (Note: After Napoleon's final defeat in 1815, he was exiled to the British-controlled island of St. Helena in the south Atlantic; where, in 1821, he died.)
- "Road Song of the Bandar-Log" ^{(ws)} (Note: The Bandar-log are a tribe of monkeys in Kipling's The Jungle Book.)
- "A British-Roman Song (A.D. 406)"
- "A Pict Song"
- "The Law of the Jungle"
- "MacDonough's Song" ^{(ws)}
- "The Heritage" ^{(ws)}
- "Song of the Fifth River"
- "The Children's Song" ^{(ws)}
- "If—"
- "A Translation" (Note: The translation is (according to Kipling) of Book V, Ode 3 by the Roman poet Horace. Both Kipling and Eliot would have known that Horace wrote only four books of odes.)
- "The Land"
- "The Queen's Men"
- "Mine Sweepers" (1914–18)
- "The Love Song of Har Dyal" ^{(ws)} (Note: Har Dyal is a character in the short story "Beyond the Pale" in Kipling's 1888 collection Plain Tales from the Hills.)
- "Mowgli's Song Against People" ^{(ws)} (Note: Mowgli is the fictional protagonist of Kipling's The Jungle Book stories.)
- "'The Trade'" (1914–18)
- "The Runes on Weland's Sword" (1906)
- "Song of the Galley-Slaves"
- "The Roman Centurion's Song" ^{(ws)}
- "Dane-Geld (A.D. 980-1016)"
- "Norman and Saxon (A.D. 1100)"
- "Edgehill Fight" (Note: The Battle of Edgehill (1642) was the first pitched battle of the First English Civil War. It was indecisive.)
- "The Dutch in the Medway (1664-72)" (Note: The navigable part of the River Medway flows through the English county of Kent and empties into the Thames Estuary. It was once an important depot of the Royal Navy. It was successfully raided in 1667 by the Dutch fleet under Admiral Michiel de Ruyter.)
- "The Secret of the Machines" ^{(ws)}
- "Gertrude's Prayer" (Note: "Gertrude's Prayer" is from the short story "Dayspring Mishandled" in Kipling's 1932 collection Limits and Renewals.)
- "The Gods of the Copybook Headings" (1919)
- "The Storm Cone" (1932)
- "The Appeal"
