= The Absent-Minded Beggar =

Poem by Rudyard Kipling

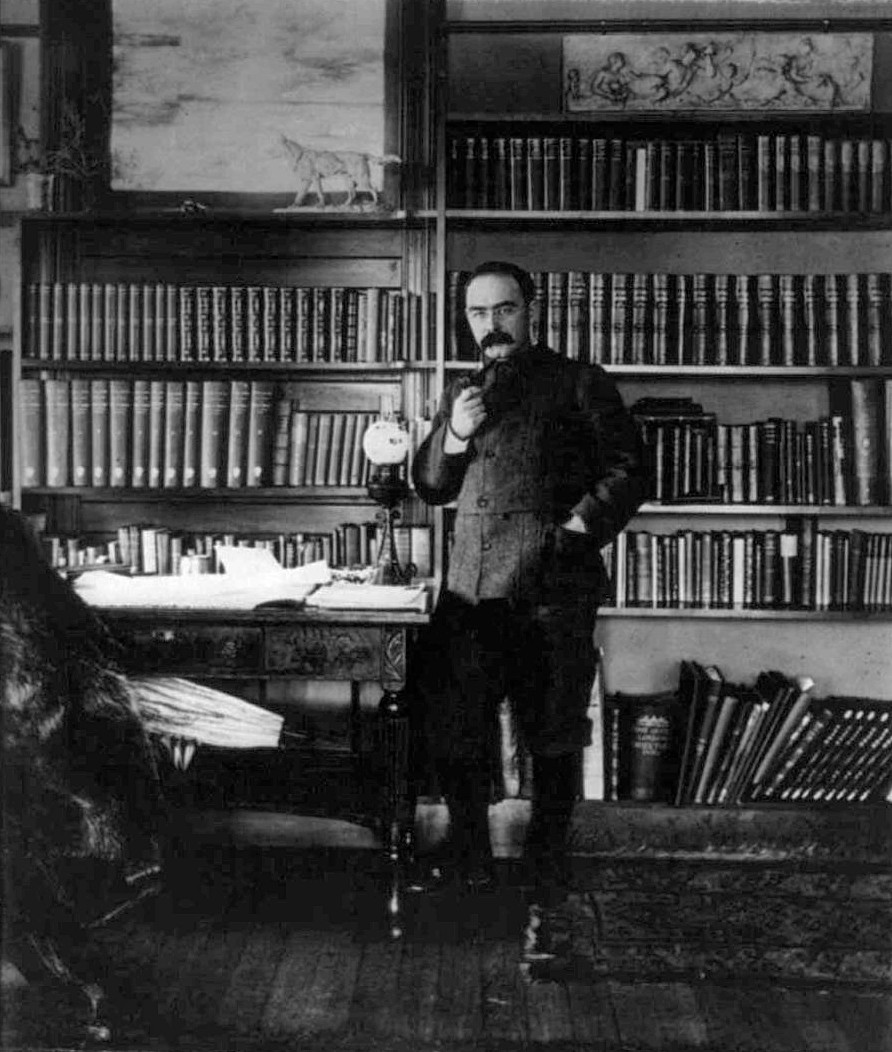
Kipling in his study in Naulakha ca. 1895

"The Absent-Minded Beggar" is an 1899 poem by Rudyard Kipling, set to music by Sir Arthur Sullivan and often accompanied by an illustration of a wounded but defiant British soldier, "A Gentleman in Kharki", by Richard Caton Woodville Jr. The song was written as part of an appeal by the Daily Mail to raise money for soldiers fighting in the Second Boer War and their families. The fund was the first such charitable effort for a war.

The chorus of the song exhorted its audience to "pass the hat for your credit's sake, and pay– pay– pay!" The patriotic poem and song caused a sensation and were constantly performed throughout the war and beyond. Kipling was offered a knighthood shortly after publication of the poem but declined the honour. Vast numbers of copies of the poem and sheet music were published, and large quantities of related merchandise were sold to aid the charity. The "Absent-Minded Beggar Fund" was an unprecedented success and raised a total of more than £250,000.

== History ==
In September 1899, it was clear that the hostilities between British settlers and Boers in South Africa was likely to turn into war. By 2 October, all British military leave had been cancelled, and urgent preparations were under way to send a large expeditionary force to the Cape Colony, with horses and supplies being requisitioned and mobilised. On 7 October, a proclamation was issued calling out the Army Reserve. Of 65,000 liable men, around 25,000 were intended to be called up for service. The Second Boer War broke out on 11 October.

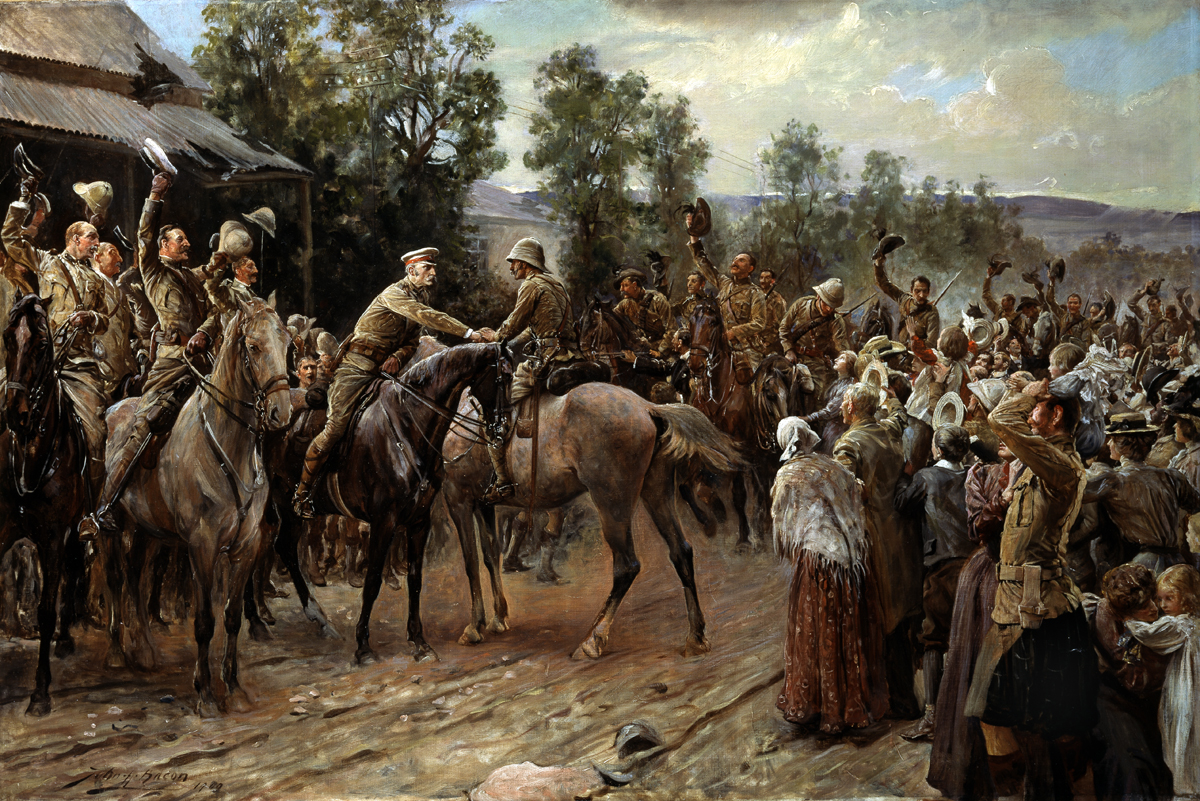
The Relief of Ladysmith. White greets Major Hubert Gough on 28 February 1900. Painting by John Henry Frederick Bacon (1868–1914)

Many, if not all, of the men thus mobilised were ex-soldiers in permanent employment for whom returning to military duty meant a significant cut in their income. As a result, many families were quickly plunged into poverty, since a lifestyle comfortably maintained on a workman's wage of twenty shillings could not be kept up on the infantryman's "shilling a day". In addition, there was no contemporary legislation protecting the permanent employment of Reservists. Employers could – and often would – replace them with other workers, with no guarantee that if the soldier returned he would be able to take back his job. In addition, of course, the men faced the prospect of injury or death. A number of charitable funds existed to support these individuals, most notably the Soldiers' and Sailors' Families Association, and a number of private appeals were also made. A wave of patriotism swept the country, catered to by jingoist newspapers such as the Daily Mail. Many of these newspapers were also involved in the charitable fundraising efforts to benefit the Reservists and their dependants.

The Daily Mail proprietor, Alfred Harmsworth, publicised efforts to help soldiers and their families. This drew the attention of Rudyard Kipling, who produced "The Absent-Minded Beggar" on 16 October 1899 and sent the verses to Harmsworth on 22 October with a note that "they are at your service. ... turn [the proceeds] over to any one of the regularly ordained relief-funds, as a portion of your contribution. I don't want my name mixed up in the business except as it will help to get money. It's catchpenny verse and I want it to catch just as many pennies as it can. ... [p.s.] It isn't a thing I shall care to reprint; so there is no need of copyrighting it in America. If any one wants to sing it take care that the proceeds go to our men." It was first published in the Daily Mail on 31 October 1899 and was an immediate success. Maud Tree, the wife of actor-manager Herbert Beerbohm Tree, recited it at the Palace Theatre, every night before the show, for fourteen months, and other performers recited it at music halls and elsewhere, giving part of the profits to the fund. The manuscript itself was auctioned for £500, and a Special Edition de Luxe was issued.

Meanwhile, by 25 October, Kipling was plotting with Harmsworth on how to maximise the fundraising from the poem. In addition to having it recited at entertainments, he suggested finding a composer to set it to a "common + catchy" tune. On 1 November, the country's premier composer, Sir Arthur Sullivan, was asked to set the poem to music. Sullivan had written some 20 operas, including fourteen comic operas with W. S. Gilbert, and a large volume of songs, orchestral pieces and other music. Although he was in the middle of orchestrating and rehearsing his next opera, The Rose of Persia (his last completed opera), Sullivan agreed. Both Kipling and Sullivan declined proffered fees for creating the song. Artist Richard Caton Woodville Jr., within several days, provided an illustration, titled "A Gentleman in Kharki", (Note: The phrase "a gentleman in khaki" is from the first verse of the poem, which uses the more common spelling, "khaki"; loanwords such as this Hindi word often had multiple forms in English. The spelling "Kharki" is given as a "vulgar" form in the Hobson-Jobson dictionary.) showing a wounded but defiant British Tommy in battle. This illustration was included in "art editions" of the poem and song.

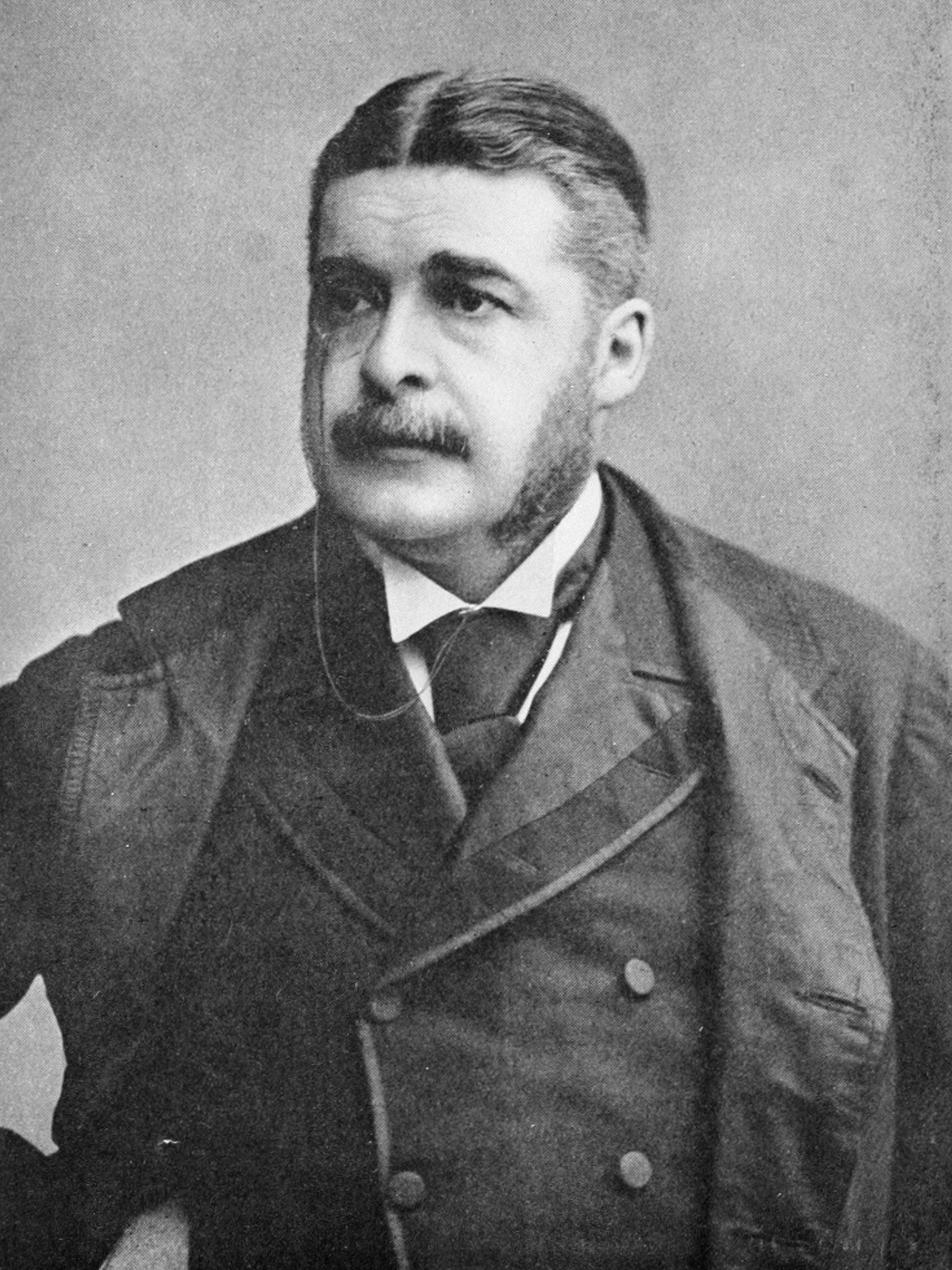
Arthur Sullivan, c. 1885

In 1897, Sullivan had agreed to compose music for Kipling's poem Recessional, but he never completed the song. When asked to set "The Absent-Minded Beggar" to music two years later, Sullivan found Kipling's verses difficult to set and said, "if it wasn't for charity's sake, I could never have undertaken the task". Still, the experienced composer completed the music in four days, on 5 November 1899, and it was published by Enoch & Sons for the Daily Mail. The first public performance was sung by John Coates, under Sullivan's baton, at the Alhambra Theatre on 13 November 1899, to a "magnificent reception" of an overflowing theatre. In 1900, "Kipling travelled to South Africa to help distribute the supplies bought with the funds raised by the song."

== Reception of the song ==
Sullivan's music captured Britain's jingoistic mood, and his diary entry notes, "Wild enthusiasm. All sang chorus! I stood on the stage and conducted the encore – funny sight!" With characteristic grace, the composer wrote to Kipling, "Your splendid words went with a swing and enthusiasm which even my music cannot stifle". Kipling, on the other hand, later described the music as "a tune guaranteed to pull teeth out of barrel-organs".

The Daily Chronicle wrote that "It has not been often that the greatest of English writers and the greatest of English musicians have joined inspiring words and stirring melody in a song which expresses the heart feelings of the entire nation". Sullivan's manuscript was later auctioned for £500 towards the fund. Critic Fuller Maitland disapproved of the composition in The Times, but Sullivan asked a friend, "Did the idiot expect the words to be set in cantata form, or as a developed composition with symphonic introduction, contrapuntal treatment, etc.?"

The poem, song and piano music sold in extraordinary numbers, as did all kinds of household items, postcards, memorabilia and other merchandise emblazoned, woven or engraved with the "Gentleman in Kharki" figure, the poem itself, the sheet music, or humorous illustrations. Some of these items were very expensive. 40 clerks answered 12,000 requests a day for copies of the poem, and it was included in 148,000 packets of cigarettes within two months of the first performance. Alternative arrangements of the song were published, such as "The Absent-Minded Beggar March".

Humorous postcard

The Daily Mail's charitable fund was eventually titled the "Absent Minded Beggar Relief Corps" or the "Absent-Minded Beggar Fund", providing small comforts to the soldiers themselves as well as supporting their families. Among other activities of the Corps, it "met the soldiers on arrival in South Africa, welcomed them on their return to Britain and, more importantly, set up overseas centres to minister to the sick and wounded". The fund raised the unprecedented amount of more than £250,000. The money was not raised solely by the Daily Mail; the poem was publicly available, with anyone permitted to perform or print it in any way, so long as the copyright royalties went to the fund. Newspapers around the world published the poem, hundreds of thousands of copies were quickly sold internationally, and the song was sung widely in theatres and music halls, first being heard in Australia on 23 December 1899. Local "Absent Minded Beggar Relief Corps" branches were opened in Trinidad, Cape Town, Ireland, New Zealand, China, India and numerous places throughout the world; all of this contributed to the fund and to other war efforts, such as the building of hospitals. The fund was the first such charitable effort for a war and has been referred to as the origin of the welfare state. In December, after the first £50,000 was raised, the Daily Mail asserted, "The history of the world can produce no parallel to the extraordinary record of this poem."

The popularity of the poem was such that allusions to it were common. Mark Twain wrote that "The clarion-peal of its lines thrilled the world". By 18 November, less than a month after publication of the poem, "a new patriotic play" was advertised to open the next week, titled The Absent Minded Beggar, or, For Queen and Country. The same month, the Charity Organisation Society called "The Absent-Minded Beggar" the "most prominent figure on the charitable horizon at present." Even a critical book on the conduct of the war, published in 1900, was titled An Absent-Minded War. Kipling was offered a knighthood within a few weeks of publication of the song but declined, as he declined all offers of State honours. Historian Stephen M. Miller wrote in 2007, "Kipling almost single-handedly restored the strong ties between civilians and soldiers and put Britain and its army back together again."

A performance of "The Absent-Minded Beggar March" on 21 July 1900 at The Crystal Palace was Sullivan's last public appearance, and the composer died four months later. "The Absent-Minded Beggar" remained popular throughout the three-year war and for years after the war ended. It became a part of popular culture of the time, with its title becoming a popular phrase and cartoons, postcards and other humorous representations of the character of the absent-minded beggar becoming popular. The song is performed in John Osborne's 1957 play The Entertainer. T. S. Eliot included the poem in his 1941 collection A Choice of Kipling's Verse.

Woodville's illustration "A Gentleman in Kharki"

The song is still heard on re-issues of early recordings and on post-Second World War recordings by Donald Adams and others. In 1942, George Orwell noted that "The phrase "killing Kruger with your mouth" ... was current till very recently". In 2010, a Kipling conference, called "Following The Absent-minded Beggar" was held at the School of the Humanities of the University of Bristol, organised by Dr. John Lee, that included lectures and an exhibition of memorabilia and documents relating to the poem and song.

== Lyrics ==
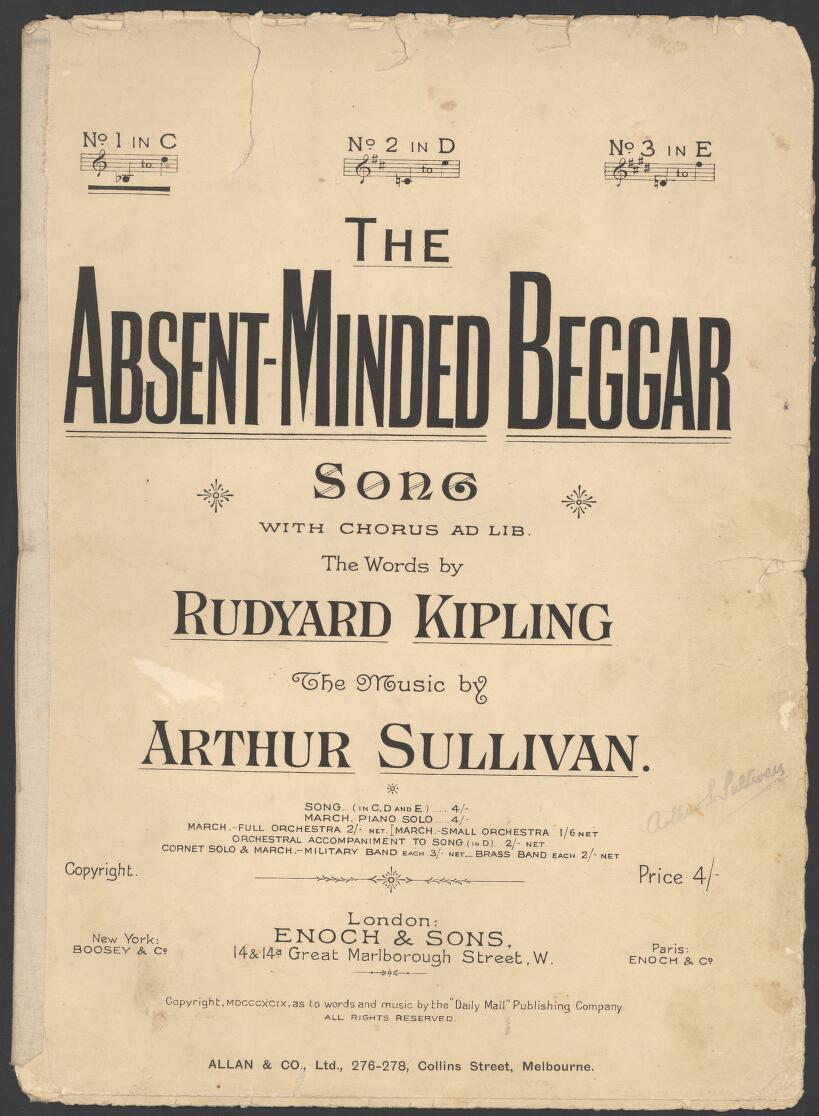
Sheet music

The first and final stanzas are:

When you've shouted "Rule Britannia," when you've sung "God Save the Queen," (Note: Queen Victoria died during the war. The next British monarch was Edward VII)
When you've finished killing Kruger with your mouth,
Will you kindly drop a shilling in my little tambourine
For a gentleman in khaki ordered South?
He's an absent-minded beggar and his weaknesses are great—
But we and Paul must take him as we find him—
He is out on active service, wiping something off a slate—
And he's left a lot of little things behind him!
Duke's son—cook's son—son of a hundred kings—
(Fifty thousand horse and foot going to Table Bay!)
Each of 'em doing his country's work
(and who's to look after the things?)
Pass the hat for your credit's sake,
and pay—pay—pay!
...
Let us manage so as, later, we can look him in the face,
And tell him—what he'd very much prefer—
That, while he saved the Empire, his employer saved his place,
And his mates (that's you and me) looked out for her.
He's an absent-minded beggar, and he may forget it all,
But we do not want his kiddies to remind him
That we sent 'em to the workhouse while their daddy hammered Paul,
So we'll help the homes that Tommy left behind him!
Cook's home—Duke's home—home of a millionaire,
(Fifty thousand horse and foot going to Table Bay!)
Each of 'em doing his country's work
(and what have you got to spare?)
Pass the hat for your credit's sake,
and pay—pay—pay!

— Stanzas 1 and 4
