= McAndrew's Hymn =

1893 poem by Rudyard Kipling

"McAndrew's Hymn" is a poem by English writer Rudyard Kipling (1865–1936). It was begun in 1893, and first published in December 1894 in Scribner's Magazine. It was collected in Kipling's The Seven Seas of 1896. Some editions title the poem "M'Andrew's Hymn". (Note: Kipling himself came to prefer "McAndrew" over "M'Andrew".)

It is an extended monologue by an elderly Scottish chief marine engineer serving in a passenger steamship, who is standing the nighttime middle watch. Except for two brief interjections to others, it is a musing on his life addressed to the Christian God from a Calvinist perspective.

== Synopsis of the poem ==
McAndrew sees God's hand, and predestination, in the working of the engines. He has had no reason to visit any port since Elsie Campbell died 30 years ago. (Note: Elsie may have been McAndrew's wife. It was a Scottish custom to refer to a dead married woman by her maiden name.) (Note: Elsie died 30 years ago, "[t]he year the Sarah Sands was burned". That was 1857. The imagined date for McAndrew's monologue is therefore 1887.) The company directors treat him with respect. He recalls how primitive engine design was when he first began, and how improvements still continue; in contrast to the soul of man. His body bears burn-scars from being thrown against a furnace door during his first typhoon; but they are as nothing against his sins of 44 years ago. (Note: The poem mentions blasphemy, hints at drunkenness and fornication, and describes worldliness. "Number Nine" in the poem has been identified with a brothel in Yokohama, Japan.) Six months short of 24 years old, while serving as third engineer in the Mary Gloster, an inner voice tempted him with pleasures to abandon his mother's religion. After long inner struggle during a sea voyage, he rejected what the voice had offered. Although tempted since, he has never been lost beyond return.

He reflects on the passengers he has carried. He must not judge them. His duty is to preserve their bodies no matter how difficult his work, not to care for their souls. Even if the passengers with their gloves and canes thank half the crew but never the dour Scots engineer, he does not mind, he likes his job. He rejects all opportunities for corruption, even though he is paid less than £400 a year, (Note: As of 2017, equivalent to about £48,000.) and has no pension. Holding his steam engines in the affection a man might reserve for a living thing, McAndrew refuses even to try to earn a bonus by using less fuel, or cheaper substitutes; only Welsh steam-coal (or when forced by necessity, Wangarti coal from New Zealand) will do. Men and women call him stern; but children sometimes understand, and he will show them where he works. He criticises those first-class passengers who think that steam has destroyed the romance of the sea. He calls for a new Robbie Burns to sing the "Song o' Steam". (Note: Robert Burns is Scotland's national poet.) He praises the parts of his engines and their designed interdependence and interworking. But, no-one cares except him. He thanks God for His gift of grace, and submits to His judgment.

The engine-room telegraph signals "Stand-By" as the ship is to rendezvous with the pilot. McAndrew teases Ferguson for running the engines slightly too fast in his haste to get back to his wife, and the poem ends as he prepares to let the furnaces die down so that the fuel will just be exhausted as the ship docks.

== Background ==
Kipling said that the poem was inspired by a voyage on the steamship Doric. According to Kipling in the original Scribner's publication (citing a "private letter"), it was inspired by a conversation during a middle watch with a man similar to McAndrew. That "private letter" of Kipling's has since been denounced as fictitious.

Scribner's offered Kipling a publication fee either of £100 or of $500 (sources differ). (Note: The 2017 equivalents are about £12,200 and about $13,800 respectively.) One source says that he at first rejected the offer but later accepted it. Other sources say that it was at the time a record fee for publication of a new poem in U.S.A.

== Analysis and reception ==
The poem consists of 188 lines; mostly rhyming couplets, but interrupted by a short cluster of rhyming triplets when McAndrew describes the temptation which he rejected.

In 1957, a retired marine engineer published his professional understanding of the technical expressions used in the poem.

The poem attracted critical attention, mostly approving, from soon after its first publication. For example, in 1897 Charles Eliot Norton called the poem "of surpassing excellence alike in conception and in execution". American-born British poet T. S. Eliot included the poem in his 1941 collection A Choice of Kipling's Verse. He thought that it belonged with another of Kipling's dramatic monologues, "The Mary Gloster" (1894). He saw both as owing something of a debt to Robert Browning, and as being "metrically and intrinsically ballads". He shared the popular verdict that "McAndrew's Hymn" is the more memorable, but did not find it easy to say why. He found both poems equally successful. The greater memorability may be because there is "greater poetry in the subject matter. It is McAndrew who creates the poetry of Steam [...]". On the other hand, Lord Birkenhead, writing in 1947, considered "The Mary Gloster" to be the more successful of the two. More recently, Peter Keating (1994) and David Gilmour (2003) also have seen similarities to Browning. In 2015, Scottish critic Stuart Kelly suggested that McAndrew was the most famous Scot in literature when John Buchan's adventure novel The Thirty-Nine Steps was published in 1915.

George Orwell criticised Kipling for his use of the "stage Cockney dialect". However, "McAndrew's Hymn" is written in a Glasgow dialect: the poem mentions Maryhill, Pollokshaws, Govan and Parkhead as places which McAndrew had known when younger, and indeed "Glasgie" itself.

This poem mentions a time when McAndrew was "Third on the Mary Gloster". Kipling's poetic monologue "The Mary Gloster" (1894) involves a McAndrew who is "Chief of the Maori Line", a "stiff-necked Glasgow beggar", who has prayed for the protagonist's soul, who is incapable of lying or stealing, and who will command the Mary Gloster on its final voyage. The descriptions of the two men are not inconsistent. Internal dating evidence in the two poems (insofar as that can be trusted in works of the imagination) is also not inconsistent. More than one writer has equated them.

== Cultural references ==
In George Orwell's 1949 novel Nineteen Eighty-Four, the protagonist Winston Smith meets in prison the poet Ampleforth, a former colleague in the Ministry of Truth. Ampleforth explains why he had been arrested. "We were producing a definitive edition of the poems of Kipling [i.e., a version edited to fit with the regime's ideology]. I allowed the word 'God' to remain at the end of a line. I could not help it!" he added almost indignantly, raising his face to look at Winston. "It was impossible to change the line. The rhyme was 'rod'. Do you realize that there are only twelve rhymes to 'rod' in the entire language? For days I had racked my brains. There was no other rhyme." Ampleforth's predicament may have been caused by "McAndrew's Hymn":

From coupler-flange to spindle-guide I see Thy Hand, O God—
Predestination in the stride o' yon connectin'-rod.

— lines 3-4

Angus Wilson quoted that couplet in his 1977 book The Strange Ride of Rudyard Kipling. Leslie Fish's "Engineer's Song" on her 1992 album Skybound sets some of the words of "McAndrew's Hymn" to music. It too includes that couplet.
