= The Taking of Lungtungpen =

1887 short story by Rudyard Kipling

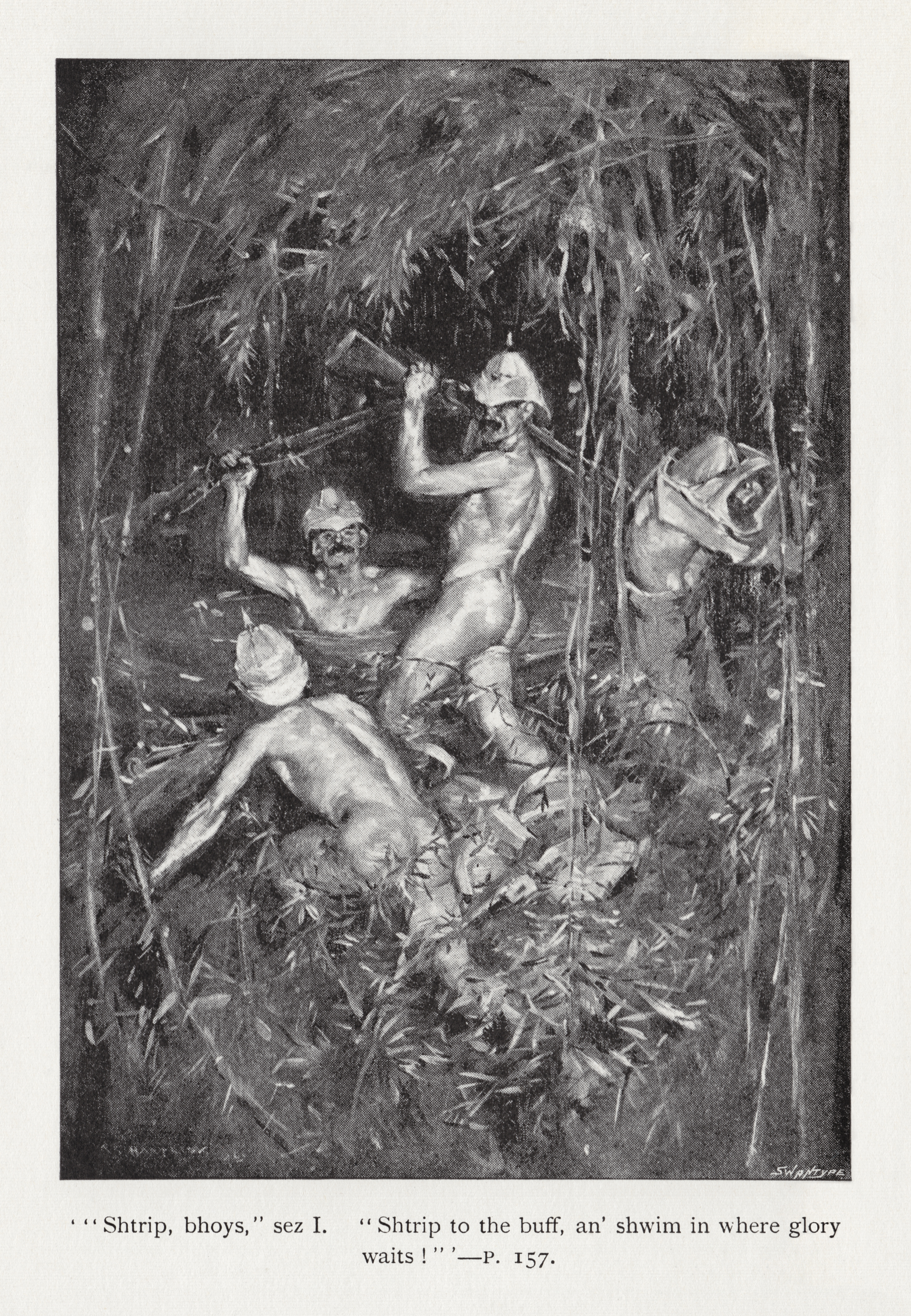
'"Shtrip, bhoys," sez I. Shtrip to the buff, an' shwim in where glory waits!"': Archibald Standish Hartrick's first illustration to the story, from Kipling's 1896 collection, Soldier Tales.

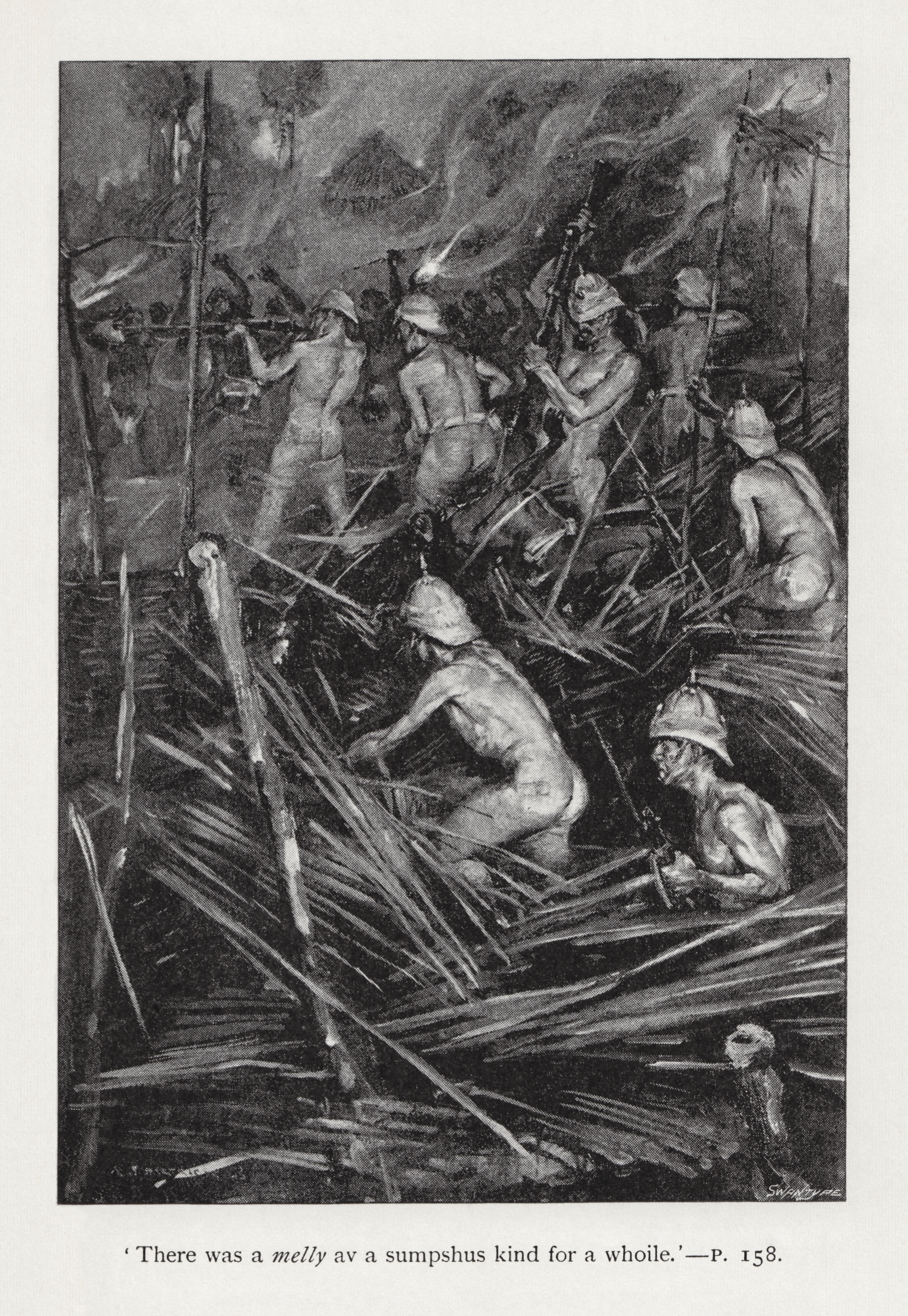
'There was a melly av a sumpshus kind for a whoile.' – from the same.

"The Taking of Lungtungpen" is a short story by Rudyard Kipling which was first published in the Civil and Military Gazette on 11 April 1887. In book form, the story appeared in the first Indian edition of Plain Tales from the Hills in 1888, and in subsequent editions of that collection.

== Plot ==
The story is about one of Kipling's three private soldiers, Learoyd, Mulvaney and Ortheris, whose adventures are further related in his collection of short stories Soldiers Three: Terence Mulvaney.

This story tells "how Privit Mulvaney tuk the town av Lungtungpen", in his own words (Kipling represents him conventionally as an Irish speaker of English). Mulvaney, who continually blots his copybook (and loses promotions and good conduct badges from his habit of "wan big dhrink a month") is nevertheless a fine soldier. When he is patrolling Burma against dacoits with 24 young recruits under Lieutenant Brazenose, they capture a suspect. Mulvaney, with an interpreter, takes the prisoner aside and "trates him tinderly" [='treats him tenderly'] with a cleaning rod. This example of army brutality extracts the information that there is a town called Lungtungpen, a haunt of dacoits, 9 miles away, 'across the river'.

Mulvaney persuades the Lieutenant not to await reinforcements, but to "visit" Lungtungpen that night. Mulvaney is in the lead when they come to the river, and tells the four men with him to strip and swim across. Two of them can't swim, but they use a tree trunk for flotation and cross the river – despite their discovery that "That shtrame [= stream] was miles woide!" When they reach the other side, in the dark they have landed on the river wall of Lungtungpen, and a fierce fight ensues – but the British are so close under the wall that, in the dark, the Burmese fire passes harmlessly over their heads.

After reinforcements arrive, the British – still naked from their swim – go in with bayonets and the butts of their rifles, as well as their ammunition. They kill 75 Burmese. They then hold "the most ondasint p'rade [= 'indecent parade'] I iver tuk a hand in", with only eight men having even belt and pouches on; the rest are "as naked as Venus". While half of them dress, the other half patrol the town, with the women laughing at them.

== Analysis ==
The moral of this story, to Mulvaney, is that it shows what three-year enlisted men can do, and why he values them above more experienced men, who would have been much more cautious. These would defeat European armies as well as dacoits. "They tuk Lungtungpen nakid; an' they'd take St. Pethersburg in their dhrawers!" Kipling appears to value the British soldier highly (see Barrack-Room Ballads (1892), Soldiers Three (1888) and many other works throughout his career).

However, the modern western reader – often lacking experience in similar cultures – may wonder at the casual imperial acceptance of brutality and a shocking casualty rate. To such a reader, it stretches credibility that women who have been widowed in this attack – and impoverished by the looting that Mulvaney relates – would laugh at the naked invaders. George Orwell, while serving with the Indian Imperial Police in Burma, observed this type of behaviour and found it extremely distasteful. Such experiences provided some of the material for his later literary career.

== Language ==
All quotations in this article have been taken from the Uniform Edition of Plain Tales from the Hills published by Macmillan & Co., Limited in London in 1899. The text is that of the third edition (1890), and the author of the article has used his own copy of the 1923 reprint. Further comment, including page-by-page notes, can be found on the Kipling Society's website, at .
