= Execution of George Flaxman =

1887 imposition of capital punishment

Private George Flaxman (c. 1860-10 January 1887) of the Leicestershire Regiment was hanged at Lucknow maidan on 10 January 1887. He had been convicted by court-martial of the murder of Lance Sergeant William Carmody of the same regiment on or around 9 September 1886. The event may have inspired Rudyard Kipling's poem "Danny Deever", which describes similar events.

== Murder of Carmody ==
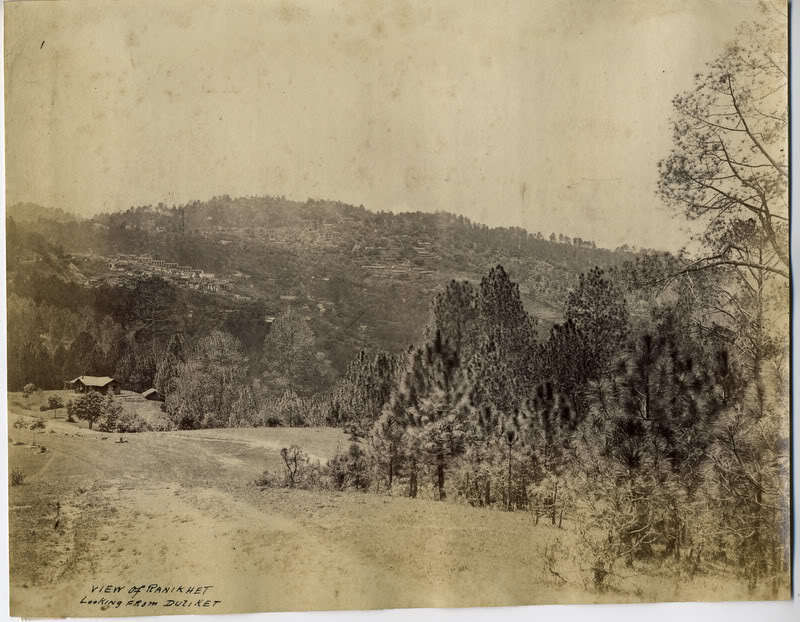
Ranikhet hill station pictured in the 1880s

Private George Flaxman served in the 2nd battalion of the Leicestershire Regiment, deployed to British India. He was a man of reasonably good conduct, being rated in band C of the regiment's good conduct register (indeed he continued to receive a good conduct bonus until the month of his execution). During his service with the regiment in India he did not appear in the Court Martial Register for any minor offences such as falling asleep on sentry or being drunk on duty. In May 1886 he was with his unit in Lucknow, North-Western Provinces and Oudh, when he was admitted to hospital. Within weeks he was transferred to Ranikhet, Kumaon division, to convalesce. Ranikhet was a hill station in the foothills of the Himalayas, some 250 miles (400 km) from Lucknow, where the milder climate was thought to be more conducive to recovery.

On or around 9 September 1886 Lance Sergeant William Carmody of the 1st battalion of the Leicestershire Regiment was murdered whilst drinking a cup of tea in his tent in Ranikhet. A court-martial found Flaxman guilty of the offence. It found that Flaxman and two others with grudges against Carmody had conspired to kill him. It was determined that the trio had dealt out a deck of cards to decide which would kill Carmody, with the man receiving the ace of spades having to carry out the act. Flaxman's defence entered a plea for clemency on account of the unusual manner in which he had been allotted the task, this was rejected by the Commander-in-Chief, India General Sir Frederick Roberts.

== Execution of Flaxman ==
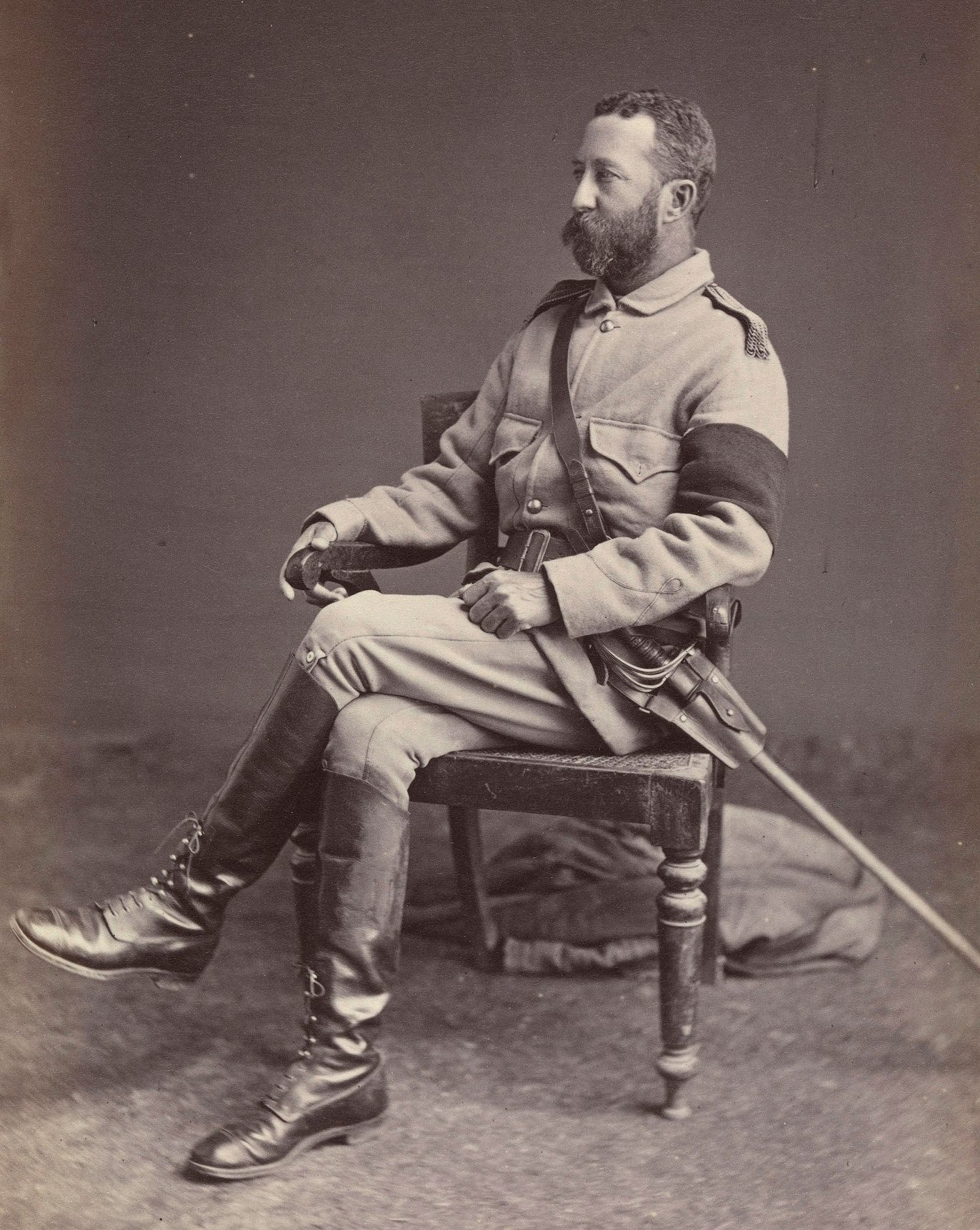
General Gough, pictured in 1879, presided over Flaxman's execution

Flaxman was hanged on the morning of 10 January 1887 in the maidan (or General Parade Ground) in Lucknow, he was then 27 years old. Troops assembled at the maidan at 8.15 am. Flaxman's battalion formed up on the face of the square opposite the scaffold, the 17th Lancers were on the face to their right and detachments of the Bengal Native Cavalry, Bengal Native Infantry and Royal Horse Artillery on the face to their left. The parade was commanded by General Sir Charles Gough.

Flaxman, who was handcuffed, was brought to the maidan in a covered carriage, accompanied by a Church of England minister and an escort of 12 men with fixed bayonets. After disembarking he was brought very close to the rear of a gun-carriage, drawn by two bullocks, that carried his coffin. In front of the carriage was his battalion's band, whose drums had been trimmed with black crepe for the occasion. After a few minutes the band major ordered a slow march and the playing of George Frideric Handel's "Dead March" from Saul. As they marched the minister prayed with Flaxman. An eye witness recalled that he marched with "a firm step and his head slightly bent". The sight shocked a number of soldiers present, both British and Indian, and some asked for permission to leave the parade.

Upon arrival at the scaffold Flaxman was ordered to turn to face his battalion. The chief warder and two assistants from the Lucknow Military Prison then removed his handcuffs and bound his hands behind his back with a black silk rope, the same that he was to be hanged with. Flaxman was then ordered to quick march to the scaffold. He kicked off his boots before climbing, at a run, the steps to the platform. One of the warders then placed a black hood over his head. An Indian executioner placed the noose over his neck and Flaxman, noticing this, told him to "go away, you black". Shortly afterwards the trigger was pulled to release the trapdoor and Flaxman fell 8 feet 3 inches (2.51 m) to his death. Flaxman was left hanging for a few minutes before a black cloth, that hid his body from general view, was removed and the assembled troops ordered to march past him. Within 23 minutes of his execution Flaxman was in his coffin and on the way to a burial in an unmarked grave.

Flaxman maintained that he was innocent throughout. The minister who attended the execution had visited him frequently in prison but Flaxman had refused to pray with him, stating that he did not need to do so because he had not committed the crime. The minister thought that Flaxman had been involved in the conspiracy but not the actual murder.

The Leicestershires' regimental history makes no mention of Flaxman's execution. Gough may have alluded to the matter during his 12 November 1888 speech to the 2nd battalion upon its leaving the Oudh military division. He noted he had seen a marked improvement in the conduct of the unit over the past eight months "which I attribute to you having got rid of some bad characters who were bringing disgrace to the Regiment". During Roberts's period as commander-in-chief (1885–1893) he oversaw eight executions. He was generally regarded as a kind commander and was known for reducing sentences of imprisonment for other crimes. Alarmed at the rate of violent crime in the army he ordered that British and Indian soldiers should no longer routinely carry ammunition for their small arms. This order was initially opposed by the Viceroy's Executive Council but was agreed to in 1887.

The Flaxman case received extensive coverage in the Lucknow-based newspaper The Pioneer. An eye witness account of the execution, made by an unknown author, was discovered in 1952 in a house clearance. It was probably written shortly after the execution. The account was published in the Leicestershire Regiment magazine The Green Tiger in August 1952 and since 2001 has been held in the collection of the Leicestershire, Leicester and Rutland Records Office.

== Potential influence on Kipling ==
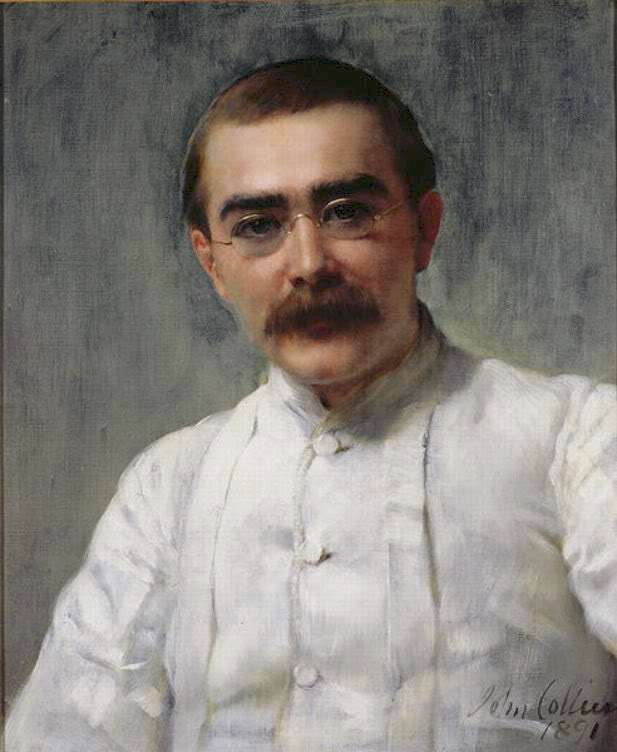
Kipling depicted in an 1891 painting by John Collier

The poet Rudyard Kipling was in India at the time of Flaxman's execution. It is thought to be unlikely that he witnessed the event as he was working in Lahore, Punjab Province (around 600 miles, 970 km away) as assistant editor of the Civil and Military Gazette, a sister paper of The Pioneer. Kipling's poem "Danny Deever" describes the execution of a soldier for the shooting of a comrade and may have been inspired by the Flaxman case. "Danny Deever" was definitely written at some point between 1886 and its first publication in the Scots Observer on 22 February 1890, but was almost certainly written in the weeks following Flaxman's execution.

Flaxman's execution was one of eight British Army regimental hangings during Kipling's years in India. The case would likely have been widely discussed in his social circle. Flaxman's execution shares many similarities with Kipling's poem, including the playing of the Dead March. A few differences include that Kipling describes men fainting in the ranks and Deever having his uniform buttons and stripes cut off (as a private, Flaxman wore no rank insignia and there is no record of his buttons being cut off). These differences may arise for artistic reasons or because Kipling did not witness the actual execution.

They are hangin' Danny Deever, you must mark 'im to 'is place,
For 'e shot a comrade sleepin'—you must look 'im in the face;
Nine 'undred of 'is county an' the Regiment's disgrace,
While they're hangin' Danny Deever in the mornin'.

— Danny Deever: stanza 3 (lines 5–8)

Lieutenant General Sir George Fletcher McMunn thought that Kipling had been inspired by Flaxman's execution and noted another execution in 1889, in his own Royal Artillery battery, of a gunner convicted of murdering an officer at Ranikhet. The Kipling Society council member R.E. Harbord thought it likely that Kipling started his poem after hearing of Flaxman's execution and was prompted to complete it when hearing of the later execution which came just as he was leaving India and had more time available to him for writing.

The method of selection of the murderer by means of dealing cards was used by Kipling in his "Black Jack" short story published in Soldiers Three in 1888; this story may have been written in 1887. Kipling's character Mulvaney overhears some of his compatriots dealing cards to determine who will murder a sergeant and then planning to blame the murder on Mulvaney. In Kipling's poem Deever is convicted for shooting a sleeping comrade. Kipling had, in January 1884, witnessed the trial of William Day, a private convicted for shooting a sleeping soldier he had earlier quarrelled with. Kipling is thought to have been inspired by a third Indian military murder, an incident in which three drunk Manchester Regiment soldiers shot dead an Indian in Multan on 26 September 1884. His The Story of Tommy was published pseudonymously in the Civil and Military Gazette three days later and recounted the story of a drunk British soldier who shoots a sleeping punkah wallah and is hanged for his crime.
