= In the Neolithic Age =

English poem from the late 19th century

- by Rudyard Kipling
- First published in: Civil and Military Gazette 31 Dec 1892; San Francisco Examiner 31 Dec 1892; The Idler December 1892
- Publication date: 1892

Full text
- The Seven Seas/In the Neolithic Age at Wikisource

"In the Neolithic Age" is a poem by the English writer Rudyard Kipling. It was published in the December 1892 issue of The Idler and in 1896 in his poetry collection The Seven Seas. The poem is the source of the quotation: "There are nine and sixty ways of constructing tribal lays, / And every single one of them is right."

== Background ==
The poem was published in the December 1892 issue of the literary magazine The Idler as the introduction to Kipling's article "My First Book", with the title "Primum Tempus". Kipling experimented with a variety of styles in his poetry. He had also been reluctant to criticize other writers after becoming well known.

In 1896, now titled "In the Neolithic Age", the poem was published in Kipling's next volume of poetry, The Seven Seas. He placed it between two other poems about tribal singers, "The Last Rhyme of True Thomas" and "The Story of Ung".

== Text ==
The narrator is a Stone Age tribal singer who reacts badly to criticism of his work. He also deals badly with other artists whose work he dislikes. He kills a younger singer as well as a cave painter.

Then I stripped them, scalp from skull, and my hunting-dogs fed full,
And their teeth I threaded neatly on a thong;
And I wiped my mouth and said, "It is well that they are dead,
For I know my work is right and theirs was wrong."

— Stanza 4

His actions are noticed by his tribe's totem, who visits him in a dream.

But my Totem saw the shame; from his ridgepole-shrine he came,
And he told me in a vision of the night:—
"There are nine and sixty ways of constructing tribal lays,
And every single one of them is right!"

— Stanza 5

In the second half of the poem the narrator has been reincarnated as a present-day poet. "And I stepped beneath Time's finger, once again a tribal singer / [And a minor poet certified by Tr—ll]." In January 1892 H. D. Traill had published an article "Our Minor Poets". In March he published a sequel which added Kipling to the list. This stanza was omitted when the poem was published in The Idler.

The poet finds his fellows still neglecting their own work to criticize others.

Here's my wisdom for your use, as I learned it when the moose
And the reindeer roared where Paris roars to-night:—
"There are nine and sixty ways of constructing tribal lays,
And—every—single—one—of—them—is—right!"

— Stanza 10

== Critical reception ==
The collection The Seven Seas was praised in the American press by Charles Eliot Norton in the Atlantic Monthly and William Dean Howells in McClure's Magazine. In London the Saturday Review's response was mixed. It begins by considering "In the Neolithic Age" and its two companion tribal singer poems to be "all excessively clever" and an attempt to "instruct the reviewer what to say". The review continues: "No, dear Kipling, there is only one way..."

== Musical setting ==
In 1993 Leslie Fish set the poem to music and recorded it with Joe Bethancourt on their album Our Fathers of Old. This is the third album Fish has done based on Kipling's poems.
