= The Mary Gloster =

1890s poem by Rudyard Kipling

"The Mary Gloster" is a poem by British writer Rudyard Kipling (1865-1936). It is dated 1894, but seems to have been first published in his 1896 collection The Seven Seas.

It is a deathbed monologue by a wealthy shipowner and shipbuilder, Sir Anthony Gloster, addressed to his only surviving child, his son Dick or Dickie, who does not speak.

== The poem ==
The old man speaks urgently to his son, who has spent his money and broken his heart. He knows that he will die tonight, even if his doctor says that he is good for another fortnight. The monologue does not follow an orderly narrative sequence. Increasingly towards the end, the old man repeats himself, and digresses.

He was a ship's master at 22, and married (to Mary) at 23. Now, 50 years later, he has made a million (£ sterling, as of 2017 equivalent to about £120M), has 10,000 on his payroll, has 40 freighters at sea, is a "baronite" (i.e. baronet), (Note: Baronetcies are inherited. When Sir Anthony dies, "Dickie" will become "Sir Richard Gloster" and his wife will become "Lady Gloster".) has dined with royalty, and the press have called him "not the least of our merchant-princes". He took on jobs which others rejected as too dangerous and, urged on by Mary, saved up enough to buy a half-share in a ship, and then to buy their own ship, the Mary Gloster, the first in his freighter line. Mary died on her, and was buried at sea in the Macassar Straits. He afterwards took to drink; but Mary told him to stop, and he devoted himself to work.

In London, using his savings, he formed a partnership with a man named M'Cullough and set up a ship-repair foundry. It was successful, and they moved to the Clyde to build ships. Business prospered, the freighter line grew, and he was always one step ahead of his competitors. M'Cullough died; he took advantage of what he found in M'Cullough's private papers, and made his fortune.

His son, nearer 40 than 30, has disappointed him. He was educated at "Harrer" (i.e. Harrow School) and Trinity College, is only interested in arts and society, and is married to a woman who Sir Anthony describes in unflattering terms both physically and personally. Their marriage is childless; whereas Mary was continually pregnant, even though only Dickie survived. Sir Anthony calls his son "weak, and a liar, and idle, and mean as a collier's whelp nosing for scraps in the galley". He is leaving Dickie £300,000 (as of 2017, equivalent to about £37M) in his will – but only the interest from it, the money is tied up in a trust which specifies that it will revert to the business if Dickie dies childless. The wife with her sham tears will hate that. Sir Anthony justifies his affairs with paid women after Mary's death.

Dickie goes to depart, but his father stops him. If Dickie does what he will now be asked to do, he will get £5,000 (as of 2017, equivalent to about £600,000), in cash. Sir Anthony does not want to be buried in the vault he had bought in Woking at a time when he had hoped to establish a family line. His will may be challenged on the grounds that he was not of sound mind when he made it; only Dickie can defend it. He wants to be buried at sea, in the Macassar Straits, at the same location as Mary. Dickie is to ask the company for the loan of Mary Gloster for a cruise. He is to write to McAndrew, who is Sir Anthony's oldest friend, who works for him, who knew Mary, and who knows his wishes; the company will grant McAndrew leave of absence if Dickie says that this concerns Sir Anthony's business. (Sir Anthony had, after his first stroke, set up arrangements with McAndrew.) The Mary Gloster is to steam to the Macassar Straits, to a place which Sir Anthony has just described and which McAndrew also knows, with the ship in ballast and Sir Anthony's body in the deck cabin. Once the body is over the side, McAndrew will give Dickie the money and land him at Macassar; then (in an act which Mary would have called wasteful), take Mary Gloster out to sea, and scuttle her. (Note: The poem does not say and Kipling never seems to have said where Mary Gloster is to be scuttled. Any source which says that she was to be scuttled at the site of the double sea-burial may be inferring something into the poem which is not there.)

Never seen death yet, Dickie? ... Well, now is your time to learn!

— line 186

== Analysis and reception ==
The poem consists of 186 lines, in rhyming couplets, typically with six stresses per line. The metre is in large part an irregular mixture of iambuses (.-) and anapaests (..-).

American-born British poet T. S. Eliot included the poem in his 1941 collection A Choice of Kipling's Verse. He thought that it belonged with another dramatic monologue, "McAndrew's Hymn" (1893). He saw both as owing something of a debt to Robert Browning, and as being "metrically and intrinsically ballads". He shared the popular verdict that "McAndrew's Hymn" is the more memorable, but did not find it easy to say why. He found both poems equally successful. The greater memorability may be because there is "greater poetry in the subject matter. It is McAndrew who creates the poetry of Steam [...]". On the other hand, Lord Birkenhead, writing in 1947, considered "The Mary Gloster" to be the more successful of the two. More recently, one writer has seen parallels between "The Mary Gloster" and Swinburne's poetry. More recently still, David Gilmour (2003) has also seen similarities to Browning.

"McAndrew's Hymn" mentions a time when one McAndrew was "Third on the Mary Gloster". "The Mary Gloster" involves a McAndrew who is "Chief of the Maori Line", a "stiff-necked Glasgow beggar", who has prayed for the protagonist's soul, who is incapable of lying or stealing, and who will command the Mary Gloster on its final voyage. The descriptions of the two men are not inconsistent. Internal dating evidence in the two poems (insofar as that can be trusted in works of the imagination) is also not inconsistent.

== Cultural references ==
In 1921, American travel writer E. Alexander Powell wrote, 'Our course took us within sight of "the Little Paternosters, as you come to the Union Bank," where, as you may remember, Sir Anthony Gloster, of Kipling's ballad of The Mary Gloster, was buried beside his wife'. In 2008, British historian John Charmley (not all of whose works are accepted without question) compared Sir Anthony to Conservative Prime Minister Bonar Law and Dickie to his predecessor Arthur Balfour. Later in 2008, British journalist Peter Stothard said that "The Mary Gloster" had been or was a favourite poem both of American writer Mark Twain and of British politician Margaret Thatcher.
