= Boots (poem) =

1903 poem by Rudyard Kipling

- by Rudyard Kipling
- First published in: The Five Nations
- Country: England
- Language: English
- Genre: Poetry
- Publication date: 1903
- Media type: Print

"Boots" is a poem by English author and poet Rudyard Kipling (1865–1936). It was first published in 1903, in his collection The Five Nations.

"Boots" imagines the repetitive thoughts of a British Army infantryman marching in South Africa during the Second Boer War. During the Advance on Pretoria in 1900, in which British troops marched more than 300 miles from Bloemfontein to Pretoria over a month, averaging 11 miles a day, it was reported that many troops felt fatigued and extremely exhausted.

During the latter half of the war, when the Boers had resorted to guerrilla warfare, the British would often go on long marches in an attempt to pursue them, often with no success, leading to further exhaustion. It has been suggested for the first four words of each line to be read slowly, at a rate of two words per second, to match with the cadence, or rhythm, of a foot soldier marching.

== Versions ==
Rudyard Kipling's poem "Boots" performed by Taylor Holmes, 1915

The 1915 spoken-word recording of the poem by American actor Taylor Holmes has been used for its psychological effect in U.S. military Survival, Evasion, Resistance and Escape schools.

The poem was set to music for low male voice and orchestra by "P. J. McCall", and recorded in 1929 by Australian bass-baritone Peter Dawson. McCall was Dawson, publishing under a pseudonym. That setting was soon recorded by other singers, but seems largely to have fallen out of fashion, possibly because of World War II.

American-born British poet T. S. Eliot included the poem in his 1941 collection A Choice of Kipling's Verse.

A Russian version of the poem, Pyl' (Russian: Пыль, Dust), was set to music by Soviet bard Evgeny Agranovich during World War II, and used as a marching song in his unit. The unit's commissar enjoyed the song, but disapproved of the foreign lyrics. Because of this, Agranovich later added several verses of his own invention to the march.

== In popular culture ==
- In 1939, in Finnegans Wake, James Joyce alludes to the poem: "[...] tucking to him like old booths, booths, booths, booths." (p. 332).
- In 2023, Holmes's recording was used in the horror film Horror in the High Desert 2: Minerva.
- In 2024, Holmes's recitation was used in the cinematic trailer for the Call of Duty: Black Ops 6 Zombies map "Terminus". ,
- In 2025, Holmes's recording was on the track "Boots" by Young Fathers, as part of their soundtrack for the horror film 28 Years Later, and its acclaimed trailer.
- In January 2026, the official Valorant TikTok account posted a stitched compilation of several cinematics animated by Fortiche with an arrangement of Holmes's recitation as the main audio.
- In 2026, the poem was used as a means of acoustic torture in Season 2, Episode 6 of the television series The Terminal List.
- In 2026, Holmes's recording was used in an A.I. generated "film trailer" posted on the YouTube channel Tupacabra that ties the 1561 celestial phenomenon over Nuremberg with various technological and military actions thereafter. Tupacabra plans on making this into a full film.

== Poem ==
We're foot—slog—slog—slog—sloggin' over Africa
Foot—foot—foot—foot—sloggin' over Africa --
(Boots—boots—boots—boots—movin' up and down again!)
There's no discharge in the war!

Seven—six—eleven—five—nine-an'-twenty mile to-day
Four—eleven—seventeen—thirty-two the day before --
(Boots—boots—boots—boots—movin' up and down again!)
There's no discharge in the war!

Don't—don't—don't—don't—look at what's in front of you.
(Boots—boots—boots—boots—movin' up an' down again);
Men—men—men—men—men go mad with watchin' em,
An' there's no discharge in the war!

Count—count—count—count—the bullets in the bandoliers.
If—your—eyes—drop—they will get atop o' you!
(Boots—boots—boots—boots—movin' up and down again) --
There's no discharge in the war!

We—can—stick—out—'unger, thirst, an' weariness,
But—not—not—not—not the chronic sight of 'em,
Boots—boots—boots—boots—movin' up an' down again,
An' there's no discharge in the war!

'Taint—so—bad—by—day because o' company,
But night—brings—long—strings—o' forty thousand million
Boots—boots—boots—boots—movin' up an' down again.
There's no discharge in the war!

I—'ave—marched—six—weeks in 'Ell an' certify
It—is—not—fire—devils, dark, or anything,
But boots—boots—boots—boots—movin' up an' down again,
An' there's no discharge in the war!

Try—try—try—try—to think o' something different
Oh—my—God—keep—me from goin' lunatic!
(Boots—boots—boots—boots—movin' up an' down again!)
There's no discharge in the war!

== Notable recordings ==
- 1915 – Taylor Holmes (spoken word) Victor B 55057
- 1929 – Peter Dawson His Master's Voice B 3072
- 1935 – Eric Woodburn
- 1940 – Norman Corwin (spoken recitation) Columbia 36055
- 1951 – Leonard Warren
