= Dane-geld (poem) =

Poem by Rudyard Kipling

"Dane-geld" is a poem by British writer Rudyard Kipling (1865-1936). It relates to the foolishness of paying "Danegeld". The most famous lines are "once you have paid him the Danegeld/ You never get rid of the Dane."

== Excerpt ==
The poem ends thus:

It is wrong to put temptation in the path of any nation,
For fear they should succumb and go astray;
So when you are requested to pay up or be molested,
You will find it better policy to say:—

"We never pay any-one Dane-geld,
No matter how trifling the cost;
For the end of that game is oppression and shame,
And the nation that plays it is lost!"

— Stanzas 5-6

== Background ==
The poem is subtitled "(AD 980-1016)". In 978, Æthelred the Unready was crowned king of England. In 980, small companies of Danish adventurers carried out a series of coastline raids against England. The raids continued; and in 991, Æthelred paid the Danes in silver to stop raiding and to go away. The Danes thought this an excellent idea – and returned year after year to demand more. In Kipling's words: "if once you have paid him the Dane-geld, you never get rid of the Dane". The practice only ceased in 1016, when the Scandinavian ruler Canute the Great invaded England, won its crown, and established control over the country.

== Publication history ==
The poem was first published in 1911, in A School History of England by C. R. L. Fletcher and Rudyard Kipling. It was included in all subsequent editions. Fletcher's description of the historical events has been said to be "lurid" and to contain "over-heavy sarcasm" when drawing parallels with the time of writing.

T. S. Eliot included the poem in his 1941 collection A Choice of Kipling's Verse.

The poem has been included in collected editions of Kipling's works; and presumably also in poetry anthologies, because it has been quoted by 21st-century historical and political writers.

== Legacy ==
Kipling did not invent the expression "paying someone Dane-geld"; but it has become attached to him, even in books of quotations. In the 1930s, it was invoked against the British government's policy of appeasing Nazi Germany.

In 1984, Margaret Thatcher quoted Kipling (Stanza 6) in her Conservative Party speech in Brighton.

In 2008, American historian Richard Abels quoted from the poem as an introduction to his own study of Danegeld. In 2011, Norwegian philosopher Ole Martin Moen quoted from the poem in an argument against paying ransoms to Somali pirates for the release of hostages.

Leslie Fish has set "Dane-geld" to music and performed it, along with other settings of Kipling, on her 1985 album The Undertaker's Horse.
