= Victorian Military Society =

British educational charity

The Victorian Military Society is a British educational charity (Registered Charity No 1117006) which promotes the study of military history – of all nations and races – in the period 1837 to 1914. Its journal Soldiers of the Queen publishes work by professional and amateur historians as well as articles by academic researchers and the Society provides speakers and lecturers to local groups and seminars as well as organising its own events.

== History ==
The Victorian Military Society was founded in 1974 by the late John Crouch FRIBA, who was an architect employed by the Ministry of Defence in Great Britain. His work involved him visiting a number of Victorian buildings and military works such as Woolwich Arsenal, Chatham Dockyard and the Palmerston Forts protecting Portsmouth Harbour. He became interested in their history and the events that had given rise to buildings of such considerable size and complexity.

As the result of a letter to the press asking if there were any other people who might share his interest in the military history of the Victorian period (at the time a somewhat unfashionable one), the Victorian Military Society was formed. The late Marquis of Anglesey, the distinguished historian of the British Cavalry, became the Society’s first President and the late Stanley Baker, the actor and producer of the film Zulu, became the Society’s first Vice-President.

Other notable members of the Society have included the military historians Ian Knight (one of the Society’s founder members) a noted expert on the Zulu War and Rorke’s Drift, Michael Barthorp author of books on the North West Frontier, the Boer War and the Sudan campaigns, and the late Kenneth Griffith, actor, documentary film maker, Boer war historian and author of a book on the siege and relief of Ladysmith.

The Society's current President is General Lord Dannatt and its Vice-Presidents are Allan Mallinson and Colonel Peter Walton.

The Society publishes original research and articles on the Victorian and Edwardian periods in its thrice-yearly journal Soldiers of the Queen, which takes its name from the popular song of the period. It became an educational charity in 2007.

Over the years, as well as publishing many articles on a wide number of subjects related to the period 1837 to 1914, the journal has also reflected some of the major anniversaries of the time, producing special editions of Soldiers of the Queen to commemorate General Gordon and the attempt to relieve Khartoum, the Boer War, the Territorial Army and its forerunners, and the 150th anniversary of the Indian Mutiny.

A whole edition was also dedicated to the Royal Navy in the Victorian period, recognising the role it played in maintaining the Pax Britannica, as well as in polar exploration, surveying the oceans and the suppression of the slave trade.

The Editor of the journal is Andy Smith and the Reviews Editor is Dr Roger T. Stearn. Regular contributors include Ian Knight, Harold E Raugh, Dr Rodney Atwood, Dr Andrew Winrow, Dorothy Anderson, N.C. Hayes and Ian Cross.

The Society also has a Living History arm, The Diehards, who recreate British infantry regiments of the Victorian and Edwardian periods.

An offshoot chapter of the Society exists in Newport, Rhode Island. Formed in the late 1970s, this group petitioned the main organization for permission to use its name and logo, which was granted. This group organizes a formal mess-style dinner in early February, but has little if any tangible connection with the parent group and its activities.
