= The Five Nations =

Collection of poems by Rudyard Kipling

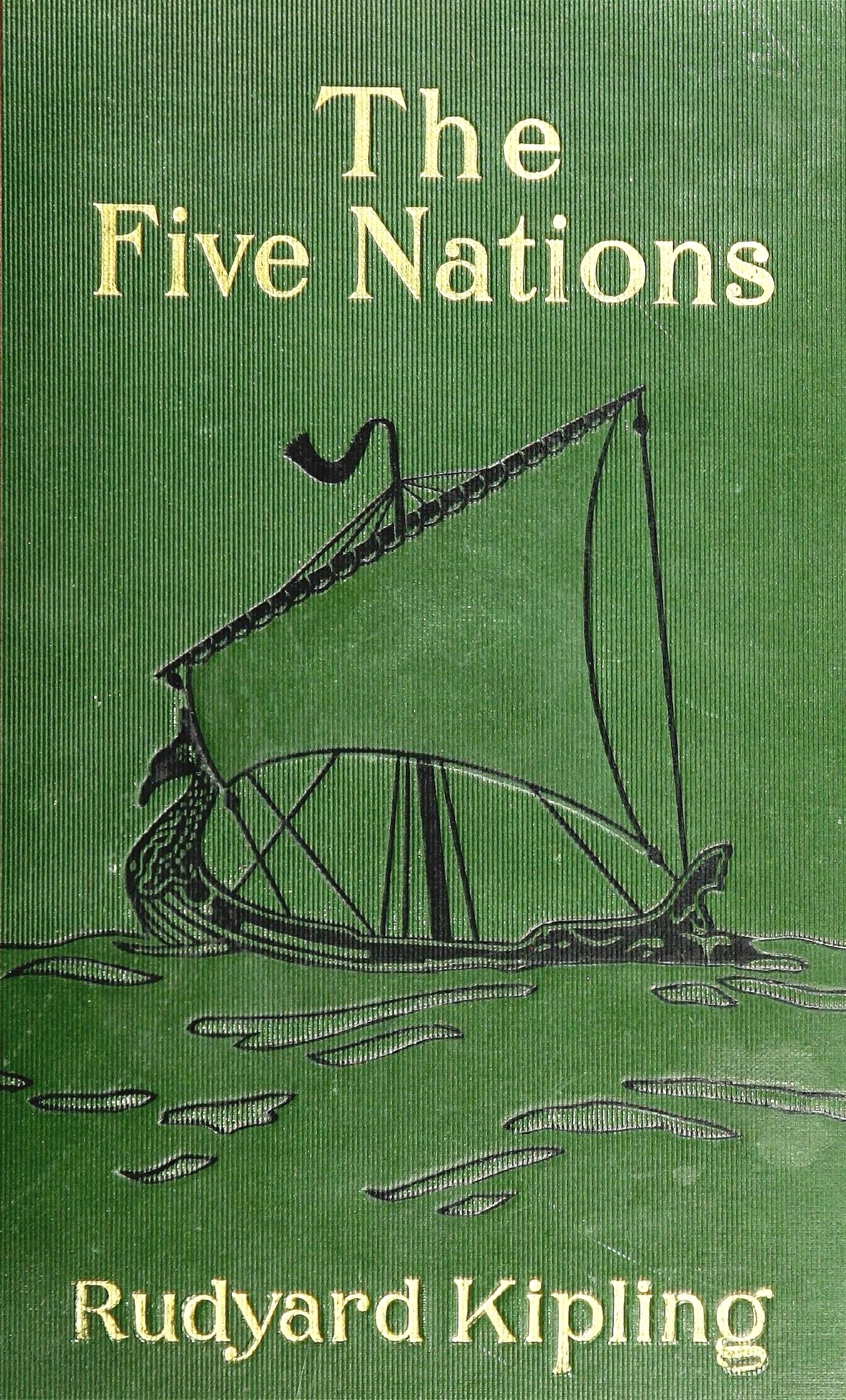
- Author: Rudyard Kipling
- Language: English
- Subject: Poetry collection
- Genre: Poetry
- Publication date: 1903
- Publication place: United Kingdom

The Five Nations, a collection of poems by English writer and poet Rudyard Kipling (1865–1936), was first published in late 1903, both in the United Kingdom and the US. Some of the poems were new; some had been published before (notably "Recessional" in 1897), sometimes in different versions.

== Description ==
In 1903, the United Kingdom consisted of four nations: England, Ireland, Scotland and Wales. It was soon suggested that Kipling's "five nations" were the "five free nations of Canada, Australia, New Zealand, South Africa [i.e. Cape Colony], and 'the islands of the sea' [i.e. the British Isles]" —all dominated by Britons; and except in the last case, by recent settlers. That suggestion was endorsed some one hundred years later.

In an early review from 1903, US literary critic Bliss Perry delicately called The Five Nations both "a notable collection" and "singularly restricted in range of interest".

== The poems ==
The poems are divided into two groups. The first is untitled, and covers a wide range of subjects. The second is titled "Service Songs", and mostly relates to the real or imagined experiences of common British soldiers around the turn of the 20th century.

=== The untitled group ===
- "Dedication"
- "The Sea and the Hills"
- "The Bell Buoy"
- "Cruisers" (Note: A cruiser is a warship.)
- "The Destroyers" (Note: A destroyer is a warship.)
- "White Horses" (Note: White horses are wind-driven waves of the sea, crowned with white foam.)
- "The Second Voyage"
- "The Dykes"
- "The Song of Diego Valdez" (Note: Diego Menéndez de Valdés (1533–1596), Spanish conquistador.)
- "The Broken Men"
- "The Feet of the Young Men"
- "The Truce of the Bear"
- "The Old Men"
- "The Explorer"
- "The Wage-Slaves"
- "The Burial"
- "General Joubert" (Note: An epitaph on Piet Joubert (1831/34 – 1900), Boer general.)
- "The Palace"
- "Sussex" (Note: Allegedly, the inspiration for the song "Sussex by the Sea".)
- "Song of the Wise Children"
- "Buddha at Kamakura" (Note: Kamakura, Japan, known for its ancient Buddhist shrines.)
- "The White Man's Burden"
- "Pharaoh and the Sergeant"
- "Our Lady of the Snows"
- "'Et Dona Ferentes'"
- "Kitchener's School" (Note: Herbert Kitchener, 1st Earl Kitchener (1850–1916).)
- "The Young Queen"
- "Rimmon" (Note: Rimmon, a Syrian deity mentioned in the Hebrew Bible at 2 Kings 5:18, usually equated to Baal.)
- "The Old Issue"
- "Bridge-Guard in the Karroo" (Note: Karroo, a semi-desert region of South Africa.)
- "The Lesson"
- "The Files"
- "The Reformers"
- "Dirge of Dead Sisters"
- "The Islanders"
- "The Peace of Dives" (Note: Dives, the rich man in the parable of the rich man and Lazarus.)
- "South Africa"
- "The Settler"

=== Service Songs ===
- "Chant-Pagan"
- "M.I." (Note: M.I. were mounted infantry.)
- "Columns"
- "The Parting of the Columns"
- "Two Kopjes" (Note: A kopje is an isolated rocky hill or outcrop in the South African plains.)
- "The Instructor"
- "Boots"
- "The Married Man"
- "Lichtenberg" (Note: Lichtenburg, South Africa.)
- "Stellenbosh" (Note: Stellenbosch is a town in the Western Cape province of South Africa. During the Second Boer War (1899–1902), it was a British military base. Officers who had failed to distinguish themselves in battle were posted there.)
- "Half-Ballad of Waterval" (Note: Waterval, South Africa.)
- "Piet"
- "'Wilful-Missing'"
- "Ubique"
- "The Return"
- "Recessional"
