= Ubique (poem) =

Poem by Rudyard Kipling

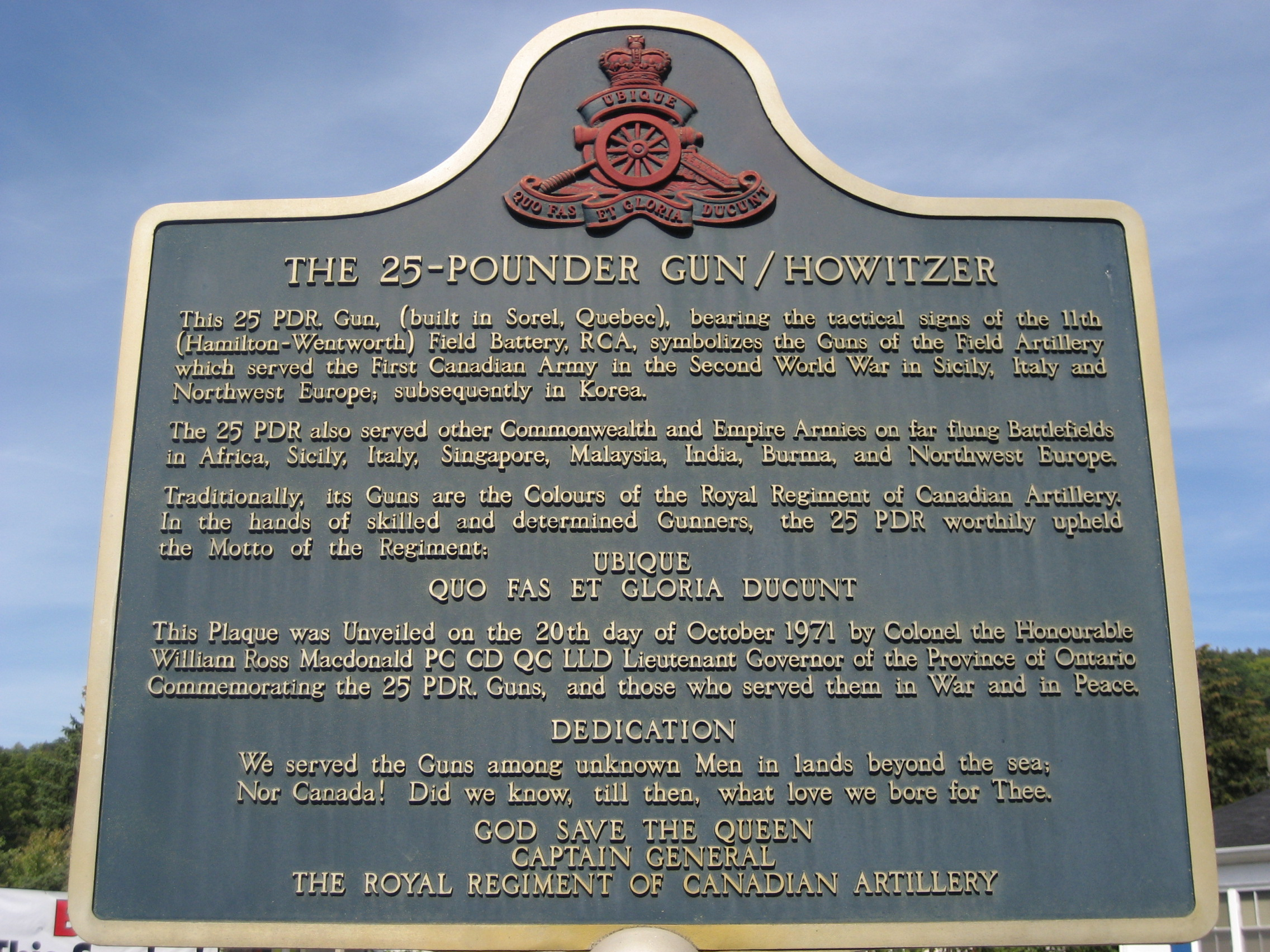
Plaque unveiled October 20, 1971 in King Street (Dundas, Hamilton, Ontario)

"Ubique" is a poem by Rudyard Kipling about the Boer War, published in The Five Nations in 1903. T. S. Eliot included the poem in his 1941 collection A Choice of Kipling's Verse.

== Use in military culture ==
Ubique ("everywhere" in Latin) is the motto of the Royal Artillery and the Royal Engineers. It was given to them by King William IV in 1832 and in 1833 it was further granted as a battle honour to the Royal Artillery in place of all former and later battle honours they could receive. In 1926, King George V granted the Royal Canadian Artillery permission to use "Ubique" in its motto.
