= Five Nations Golf Club =

Golf Club

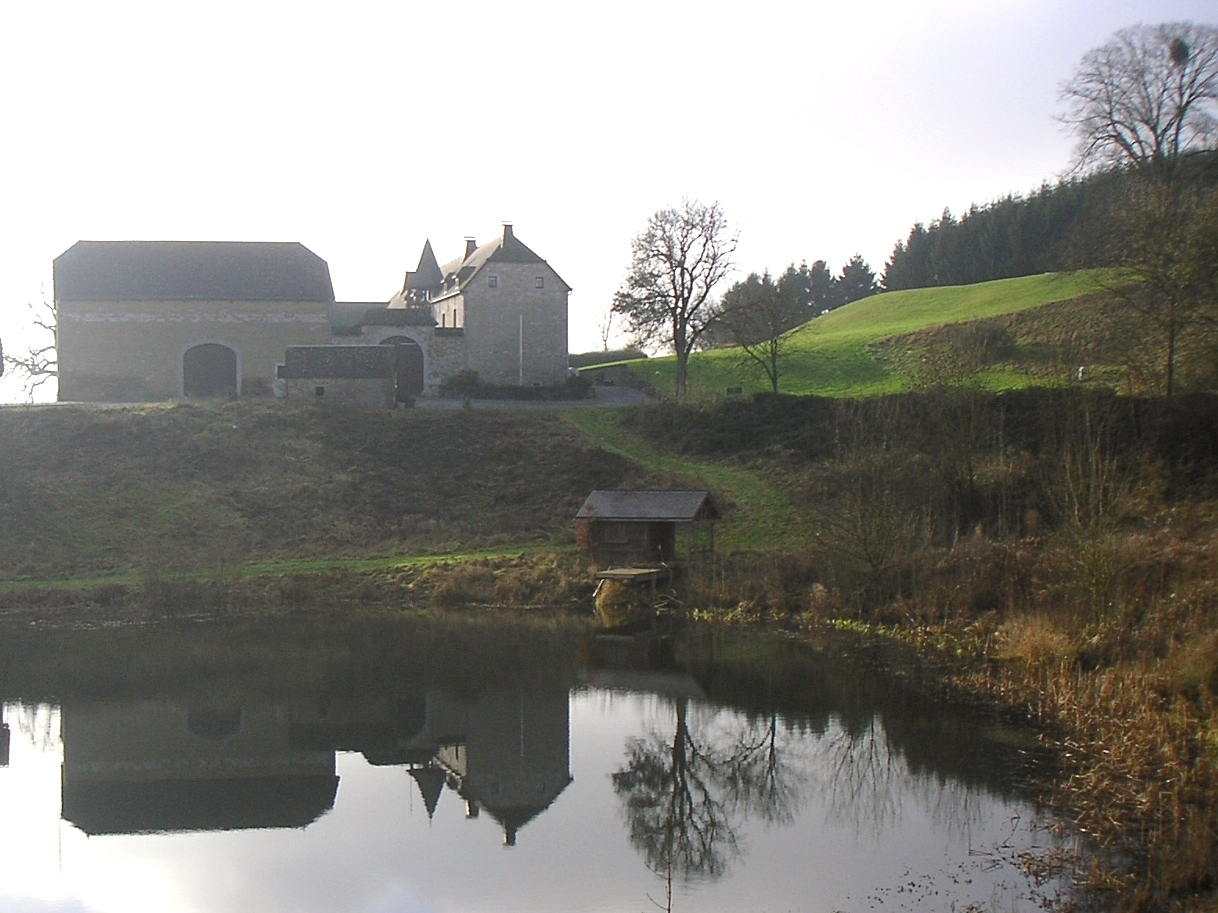
- Interactive map of Five Nations Golf Club
- 50°20′46″N 5°21′1″E

Club information
- Location: Méan (Belgium)
- Established: 1990
- Tota holes: 18
- Website: www.fivenations.be

18 holes
- Designed by: Gary Player
- Par: 72
- Length: 6038 m
- Course rating: 72.3; Slope 130

Practice - 3 holes
- Par: 10
- Length: 500 m

Five Nations Golf Club is located in the village of Méan, near Marche-en-Famenne, Belgium. Its name was chosen because of its central position close to Germany, Luxembourg, France, The Netherlands and Belgium.

The 18-hole, par 72 course was designed by Gary Player. The "front nine" is a promenade in the forest while the "back nine" looks like a links.

Many holes are surrounded by water hazards and by thick roughs that make the course somewhat difficult for the visitor.

	Men's back tees	Men's front tees	Ladies'back tees	Ladies'front tees
Par	72	72	72	72
CR	72.3	70.1	74.0	70.0
Slope	130	124	125	123
Length	6038m	5623m	5303m	4700m

In addition to the driving range, it has a 3-hole practice course composed of two par-3 and one par-4.

== Sources ==
- Five Nations's EGA handicap table
