= Learoyd, Mulvaney and Ortheris =

Three fictional characters by Rudyard Kipling

Rudyard Kipling introduces, in the story The Three Musketeers (1888) three characters who were to reappear in many stories, and to give their name to his next collection Soldiers Three. Their characters are given in the sentence that follows: "Collectively, I think, but am not certain, they are the worst men in the regiment so far as genial blackguardism goes"—that is, they are trouble to authority, and always on the lookout for petty gain; but Kipling is at pains never to suggest that they are evil or immoral. They are representative of the admiration he has for the British Army—which he never sought to idealise as in any way perfect—as in the poems collected in Barrack-Room Ballads (1892), and also show his interest in, and respect for the "uneducated" classes. Kipling had great respect for the independence of mind, initiative and common sense of the three—and their cunning.

The three are distinguished by their accents, and by Kipling's use of standard stereotyping. If money is to be discussed, it will be done by Learoyd, the caricature Yorkshireman always careful with "brass"; Mulvaney, the Irishman, is the most talkative; and the cockney Ortheris is the most street-wise. But each is much more than a caricature or stereotype: that aspect of their construction is partly a question of the economy Kipling has to use in these short pieces, and partly an aspect of his presentation of himself as an ingenuous young reporter.

== Mulvaney ==
Private Terence Mulvaney (whose surname should be pronounced Mullvanny) is the leader of the three. He is an Irishman: his speech is distinguished by certain dialect characteristics, even if the dialect is to some extent stage Irish. His "t"s and "d"s are often aspirated (indicated by a following "h", as in "dhrinkin"); the strength of his pronunciation of "wh-" is often indicated by preceding it with "f" ("fwhat" for "what"); his "s" is often followed by an "h" (as in "pershuade"); the different quality of his vowels from the Received Pronunciation of his day is indicated by variant spellings. For example,

Thin I became a man, an' the divil of a man I was fifteen years ago. They called me Black Mulvaney in thim days, an', begad, I tuk a woman's eye. I did that! Ortheris, ye scrub, fwhat are ye sniggerin' at? Do you misdoubt me? [emphasis added]

This shows not only the spelling of his speech, but indicates the articulate fluency with which he speaks (he has "the gift of the gab") and also demonstrates, if read aloud, Kipling's feeling for the rhythms and "swing" of Irish English. It also has the word "misdoubt", which is more local than Standard English.

Mulvaney is also representative of the stereotypical Irishman in that he drinks, and has lost all his good conduct pay and badges; but he is less typical in that he is an exemplary soldier in what he (and Kipling) thinks is important: he may be regularly Confined to Barracks for his misdemeanours (mostly for being drunk and disorderly)—he thinks this is fair enough - but he supports army traditions (The Three Musketeers shows him defending the tradition of Thursday half day working, more successfully that the rest of the regiment) and resents some "cruel bad treatment" by the Colonel in The God from the Machine: "Me that have saved the repitation av a ten times better man than him".

Even though Mulvaney gets into some fairly farcical adventures, (passing himself off as a god in "The Incarnation of Krishna Mulvaney") and speaks in a broad Irish dialect, in the bulk of the stories Kipling portrays him seriously. As a veteran private of the line who "knows the duty of his shuperior officer and does it at the salute" he is both the backbone of the British army (and therefore the British empire) and also a tragic hero whose only son died in childbirth and who has nothing to show for his decades of service other than the love of his wife, the devoted Dinah Shadd.

Many of Mulvaney's stories are contradictory in nature, reflecting his divided view of himself. "Good cause has the Regmint to know me for the best soldier in ut. Better cause have I to know meself as the worst man." In a story like "The Solid Muldoon," for example, Mulvaney begins by bragging of his success with women during his long-ago days as a fast-rising corporal in the regiment. Yet as the story continues, we see Mulvaney not only rejected by the beautiful and virtuous Annie Bragin, but forced to see himself as others see him, a shallow cad driven solely by vanity and lust.

The passing of time and the loss of youth are themes in a number of Mulvaney's narratives as well. In "Black Jack" the story begins in the present, with an aging Mulvaney needlessly humiliated and punished with extra duty by callow, weak-willed Sergeant Mullins. After his punishment is over for the day, Mulvaney, still in a rage, leads his friends several miles off base, where he tells the story of how he once prevented the murder of the cruel and immoral Sgt. O'Hara. Mulvaney makes it clear that though he hated O'Hara there was respect between them, such as is no longer possible with younger men like Mullins in command.

"He was the tallest man in the regiment" (The God from the Machine)

== Ortheris ==
According to John McGivering, "it has been suggested that when Kipling asked himself 'Who is to be the third Musketeer?' he answered himself 'The author is!' (Ortheris)."

In many ways Ortheris is the "odd man out" in the trio of British soldiers. Mulvaney refers to him as "little man" and he appears to be younger as well as smaller than tough, Irish Mulvaney and hulking Yorkshireman Learoyd. Unlike his comrades, Ortheris is a superb rifle shot and in combat relies on marksmanship rather than brute strength. He is no coward, however; in the story "His Private Honour" Ortheris actually challenges an officer who has accidentally struck him to a fist fight, and inflicts considerable damage even though he is ultimately knocked out. Ortheris is the only member of the Soldiers Three who expresses a desire to rise in society, perhaps because he is the product of a modern big city, London, and has a skilled trade as a taxidermist.

T. S. Eliot included "Private Ortheris's Song" in his 1941 collection A Choice of Kipling's Verse.

== Learoyd ==
Learoyd is a slow-moving, slow-talking, but deeply loyal and quietly sympathetic Yorkshireman. While Ortheris sometimes mocks his slow speech and northern English dialect, Mulvaney shows him enormous respect. A born listener, just as Mulvaney is a born talker, he serves as a silent background in most of the Soldiers Three stories. One of the most tragic and powerful stories in the Soldiers Three collection, however, "On Greenhow Hill," details John Learoyd's past in memorable fashion and explains why he joined the army.

== The narrator ==
The narrator of the Soldiers Three stories is a young British reporter for a newspaper in India. He is never identified by name. Like Kipling, he prides himself on a profound knowledge of the British army and the character of the common British soldier. He is also an unapologetic booster of the cause of the expanding British empire, and he continually draws the reader's attention to the essential role of the military. More than that, the stories themselves are meant to drive home how difficult conditions are for common soldiers like Ortheris, Mulvaney, and Learoyd while serving in India.

== List of stories ==
In approximate chronological order.

Title	Collected	Notes
On Greenhow Hill	Life's Handicap	Set before Learoyd enlisted
Black Jack	Soldiers Three	Mulvaney still with the Black Tyrone
God from the Machine, The	Soldiers Three	Mulvaney not married
Solid Muldoon, The	Soldiers Three	Mulvaney not married, still a Corporal
My Lord the Elephant	Many Inventions	Mulvaney not married
Courting of Dinah Shadd, The	Life's Handicap	Mulvaney still a Corporal
Daughter of the Regiment, The	Plain Tales from the Hills	Mulvaney still a Corporal
Three Musketeers, The	Plain Tales from the Hills	
Taking of Lungtungpeng, The	Plain Tales from the Hills	Action takes place in Burma
Private Learoyd's Story	Soldiers Three	
With the Main Guard	Soldiers Three	Silver's Theatre
Love o' Women	Many Inventions	Follows immediately after the action in Silver's Theatre
Madness of Private Ortheris, The	Plain Tales from the Hills	Takes place in current time (i.e. not someone recounting a past adventure)
Incarnation of Krishna Mulvaney, The	Life's Handicap	Takes place in current time. Includes an introduction to the three soldiers.
His Private Honour	Many Inventions	Takes place in current time
Big Drunk Draf', The	Soldiers Three	Mulvaney retired from army

Stories in which the three are only peripherally involved:

- In the Matter of a Private (Soldiers Three)

Involves Corporal Slane of the Old Regiment, who is about to marry Jhansi McKenna (The Daughter of the Regiment).

- Garm - a Hostage (Actions and Reactions)

The narrator looks after a dog belonging to a soldier (who appears to be Ortheris) and seeks the advice of another soldier (who appears to be Mulvaney). Neither soldier is named, Ortheris features mainly at the start and the end, and Mulvaney features once very briefly.
