= No Heaven for Gunga Din =

1965 fable by Ali Mirdrekvandi

- Cover of Dutton edition
- Author: Ali Mirdrekvandi علی میردریکوندی
- Cover artist: Leo and Diane Dillon
- Language: English
- Genre: Fable
- Published: 1965 (E. P. Dutton & Company)
- Pages: 128
- OCLC: 366963

No Heaven for Gunga Din; consisting of The British and American Officer's Book, is a fable by Ali Mirdrekvandi (who "preferred to be called 'Gunga Din'"), edited by John Hemming, who also wrote the introduction. Published in 1965 by Victor Gollancz Ltd (London) and E. P. Dutton & Company (New York), and in six other languages.

In the foreword Professor R. C. Zaehner (of All Souls College, Oxford) says Ali Mirdrekvandi was an Iranian peasant who had taught himself to read and write Persian, and then English when British and American troops arrived during World War II. The book's author is the subject of a 2013 documentary by Gholamreza Nematpour.

== Author ==
The British and American Officer's Book was written by Mirdrekvandi while working at an officers' mess in Tehran during World War II, then given to Hemming (then a British officer), who was mentoring him. Hemming's last contact with Mirdrekvandi was in 1949. At the time of publication the author's history and current circumstances were unknown. Some sources have asserted that Mirdrekvandi was fictional, and the story actually written by Hemming or Zaehner.

On publication of the book in 1965 the Iranian press instituted a public search for Mirdrekvandi, characterized as a "missing millionaire". His brother, a former classmate, and others who recalled him were found, with the additional information that was he born some time in 1916–1918 in a village in Lorestan Province in western Iran. According to one source he was raised by his grandfather after his parents were "taken away by soldiers" and never heard of again. This would have been around the time the Pahlavi dynasty had crushed a rebellion by the nomadic Lurs of Lorestan. Young Ali's talents were noted, and he was sent to a school for sons of tribal leaders "not to learn banditry and robbery." He reportedly left school after a dispute with the son of the school director, and was working for a railway when British and Soviet forces entered Iran at the beginning of World War II.

It was later discovered that Derikvandi had been living in impoverished circumstances in the town of Borujerd, where he was notable for reading many English language books. He is reported to have written several other stories, which he burned after reading them to fellow homeless people, and to have died on November 26, 1964, just prior to the publication of his book. He had expected his British and American Officer's Book would soon be published but suffered from drug addiction and memory loss. One other unpublished manuscript by Derikvandi, entitled Irradiant, remains in Hemming's archives.

== Story ==
The story is told in somewhat broken English with an often curious choice of words (such as "steepy" for a steep place). Mirdrekvandi's English has been described as "often very comic, ... almost always felicitous." The story lacks the sophisticated style of modern writing, being more like the narrative style of ancient ballads.

The story has been described as "a kind of Pilgrim's Progress" as the 82 officers trek across the Milky Way seeking Heaven "with General Burke their commander in their front and Gunga Din their servant in their behind." Along the way various stories are told, such as the traveler who, wanting to see how blind people walk, closed his eyes for a section, and so missed some money certain angels had left on the side of the road for him.

When they reach the gate of Heaven they find it is guarded by M.P.s (Military Police), who prevent them from entering without Freedom Passes. For these they must go to the Judgement-Field and be judged. Fearing they will be condemned to Hell they become outlaws in a forest on the border of Heaven, giving the Heaven M.P.s much trouble for eight years. Eventually Adam is asked to deal with his children, and he arranges for them to be judged.

At the Judgement Field the officers' sins are forgiven on the condition of spending 14 minutes in purgatory. Gunga Din, however, is condemned to Hell for forty earthly years. After suffering bad dreams the officers appeal on his behalf. The story ends with the Children of Man agitating for changes in how Heaven and Hell are run.

== Sources ==
- Mirdrekvandi, Ali (1965). No Heaven for Gunga Din. E. P. Dutton & Company. LCCN 65023748. Edited and introduction by John Hemming, foreword by Professor R. C. Zaehner.
- Motamedi-Fraser, Mariam (November 2013). "Locating the Archive: The Search for 'Nurafkan'". Ibraaz.
- Nematpour, Gholamreza (2013). No Heaven For Gunga Din — Baraye Gungadin Behesht Nist. In Persian with English subtitles.
- Zaehner, R. C. (1965). "Zoroastrian Survivals in Iranian Folklore" (PDF). Iran. 3. British Institute of Persian Studies: 87–96. doi:10.2307/4299562. JSTOR 4299562.
- Zaehner, R. C. (1992). "Zoroastrian Survivals in Iranian Folklore II" (PDF). Iran. 30. British Institute of Persian Studies: 65–75. doi:10.2307/4299870. JSTOR 4299870. With introduction by P. G. Kreyenbroek.

== Book reviews ==
- Capouya, Emile (September 25, 1965). "Protest March on Purgatory". Saturday Review.
- Sayre, Joel (September 24, 1965). "Heavenly Homer from an Iranian Batman". Life.
- Tidwell, Gregory (2007). "No Heaven for Gunga Din by Mirdrekvandi, Ali, 1965". Ompahlos' SF Book Reviews.
