= Soldiers of the Queen (magazine) =

- Language: English

Publication details
- History: 1976–
- Publisher: Victorian Military Society
- Frequency: Triannual

Standard abbreviations
- ISO 4: Soldiers Queen

Indexing
- ISSN: 0143-5515
- OCLC no.: 61219407

Links
- Journal homepage

Soldiers of the Queen is the quarterly academic magazine of the Victorian Military Society. It covers many aspects of military and naval history of the Victorian and Edwardian eras, but with a strong emphasis on the armed forces of Great Britain and the British Empire, and the colonial wars of this period. The editor for many years was Roger Stearn, who remains the journal's reviews editor. The editor-in-chief is Andy Smith. The magazine is based in Newbury.
