= The Ballad of East and West =

Poem by Rudyard Kipling

"The Ballad of East and West" is a poem by Rudyard Kipling. It was first published in 1889, and has been much collected and anthologized since.

== The poem ==
Kamal, a tribal chieftain in the North-West Frontier of the British Raj, steals a British Colonel's prize mare. The Colonel's son, who commands a troop of the Guides Cavalry, asks if any of his men know where Kamal might be. One does, and tells him, but warns of the dangers of entering Kamal's territory, which is guarded by tribesmen concealed among the rocks and scrub.

The Colonel's son takes a dun horse and sets off to retrieve the mare. He catches up with Kamal at the edge of the chieftain's territory and fires his pistol, but he misses. Kamal challenges the Colonel's son to a riding contest, and the two men gallop until dawn. The dun falls when crossing a river, and Kamal pulls the Colonel's son to safety and knocks the pistol out of his hand. When Kamal says that the Colonel's son is only still alive because he has not gestured to his hidden men to kill the young man, the Colonel's son counters that the retribution for his death by the Raj would likely cost Kamal more than the act would be worth. He demands that Kamal return the mare and says he will fight his own way back to his territory.

Through the chase and their posturing, the two men have developed respect for each other. Kamal helps the Colonel's son to his feet, and the young man offers to give the mare to the chieftain as a gift from his father. However, the mare goes over to the Colonel's son and nuzzles him, so Kamal decides to respects the animal's choice. He gives her back to the Colonel's son, along with the fine tack with which he has equipped her. The Colonel's son offers another pistol to Kamal, saying the first was taken from a foe, but this one is offered by a friend. As a final gesture, Kamal commands his only son go with the Colonel's son to protect and serve him, even though that will mean fighting for England against her enemies, which include Kamal himself.

The Colonel's son and Kamal's son swear blood brotherhood and ride back to the British fort. Kamal's son is greeted with hostility by the guards, but the Colonel's son admonishes them, saying that his companion is now no longer a border thief, but a fellow soldier.

== Critical analysis ==
The first line of the poem is often quoted, sometimes to ascribe racism to Kipling in regard to his views on Asians. Those who quote it thus often miss the third and fourth lines, which contradict the opening line. The full refrain that opens and closes the poem reads:

Oh, East is East, and West is West, and never the twain shall meet,
Till Earth and Sky stand presently at God's great Judgment Seat;
But there is neither East nor West, Border, nor Breed, nor Birth,
When two strong men stand face to face, though they come from the ends of the earth!

— lines 1–4

This may be read as saying that it is indisputable that geographic points of the compass will never meet in this life, but that when two strong men [or equals] meet, the accidents of birth, whether of nationality, race, or family, do not matter at all—the mutual respect such individuals have, each for the character, prowess, and integrity of the other, are their only criteria for judging and accepting one another. Any differences in ethnicity between such individuals are never even considered.

The poem is written with rhyming heptameters, two of which are equivalent to a ballad stanza. Some texts print the poem in groups of four lines.

It is written in the style of a border ballad. The vocabulary, stock phrases and rhythms are reminiscent of the old ballads, and the culture described is not unlike that of the Border Reivers. The first line of the actual story, for example, is: "Kamal is out with twenty men to raise the Border-side," meaning that a raid is in progress to cause trouble in the Border. In this poem, the border is the North-West Frontier of the British Raj (which was, at the time the poem was written, on the boundary of the Raj, but is now in Pakistan), but it harks back to the English/Scottish Border. The second line contains the word "lifted", a Scots term for "stolen". The fourth line contains the word "calkin", a term for part of a horseshoe, which Kamal is said to have "turned", referring to a trick used by horse-mounted brigands of reversing horseshoes to leave misleading tracks. The second quatrain (line 9) has the stock phrase: "Then up and spoke the Colonel's son that led a troop of the Guides", which is also found in the Scottish ballad Sir Patrick Spens. Such echoes are found throughout the poem.

There is a couplet that is repeated with slight variations several times:

There is rock to the left, and rock to the right, and low lean thorn between,
And ye may hear a breech-bolt snick where never a man is seen. (lines 19–20)

There was rock to the left and rock to the right, and low lean thorn between,
And thrice he heard a breech-bolt snick tho' never a man was seen. (lines 35–36)

There was not a rock for twenty mile, there was not a clump of tree,
But covered a man of my own men with his rifle cocked on his knee. (lines 43–44)

T. S. Eliot included the poem in his 1941 collection A Choice of Kipling's Verse.
