= All About H. Hatterr =

1948 novel by G. V. Desani

- First edition (published by Aldor Press, London)
- Author: G. V. Desani
- Language: English
- Genre: Novel
- Publisher: Aldor Press
- Publication date: 1948
- Publication place: United Kingdom
- Pages: 256 (NYRB Classics edition)
- ISBN: 978-1590172438

All About H. Hatterr (1948) is a novel by G. V. Desani chronicles an Anglo-Malay man's adventures in search of wisdom and enlightenment. "As far back as in 1951," Desani later wrote, "I said H. Hatterr was a portrait of a man, the common vulgar species, found everywhere, both in the East and in the West".

== Literary significance and reception ==
Salman Rushdie comments,

The writer I have placed alongside Narayan, G.V. Desani, has fallen so far from favour that the extraordinary All About H. Hatterr is presently out of print everywhere, even in India. Milan Kundera once said that all modern literature descends from either Richardson's Clarissa or Sterne's Tristram Shandy, and if Narayan is India's Richardson then Desani is his Shandean other. Hatterr's dazzling, puzzling, leaping prose is the first genuine effort to go beyond the Englishness of the English language. His central figure, 'fifty-fifty of the species,' the half-breed as unabashed anti-hero, leaps and capers behind many of the texts in this book. Hard to imagine Allan Sealy's Trotter-Nama without Desani. My own writing, too, learned a trick or two from him.

The mad English of All About H. Hatterr is a thoroughly self-conscious and finely controlled performance, as Anthony Burgess points out in its preface:

But it is the language that makes the book, a sort of creative chaos that grumbles at the restraining banks. It is what may be termed Whole Language, in which philosophical terms, the colloquialisms of Calcutta and London, Shakespearean archaisms, bazaar whinings, quack spiels, references to the Hindu pantheon, the jargon of Indian litigation, and shrill babu irritability seethe together. It is not pure English; it is, like the English of Shakespeare, Joyce and Kipling, gloriously impure.

Comments Amardeep Singh, Assistant Professor of English at Lehigh University on the novel's mad English:

One of the reasons many people are afraid of this novel is its reputation for slang-ridden obscurity. Actually, it's not that obscure -- certainly not as difficult as Ulysses (and not even on the same astral plane as Finnegans Wake). Moreover, the obscurity is generally literary, not linguistic. In the first 100 or so pages of the novel, I counted a total of ten Hindi words in the text. And most of those are 'Hobson-Jobson' words like topi (hat), which would have been readily familiar to readers in 1948...

Anthony Burgess, in his preface to the 1969 edition of the novel, is also careful to disavow the métèque label that dogged late colonial African writers like Amos Tutuola. F. W. Bateson coined Métèque as a way of referring to writers for whom English was a second or third language, who don't respect (or don't know) 'the finer rules of English idiom and grammar'.

It's not that such writing can't produce interesting effects. But successful forays into slang or, even further, dialect English, are rarely interesting to fluent English speakers unless they are carefully controlled -- by a writer who is quite confident (and of course competent) in the language. The writer may have a memory of learning English, but he or she cannot still be learning English at the time of the writing of the novel. Conrad, Nabokov, and even the contemporary writer Jonathan Safran Foer (Everything Is Illuminated) knew exactly what they were doing. So did Desani.

The mad English of All About H. Hatterr is a thoroughly self-conscious and finely controlled performance.

The novel appeared in The Telegraph's 2014 list of the 10 all-time greatest Asian novels.
