= G. V. Desani =

British-Indian writer and educator (1909–2000)

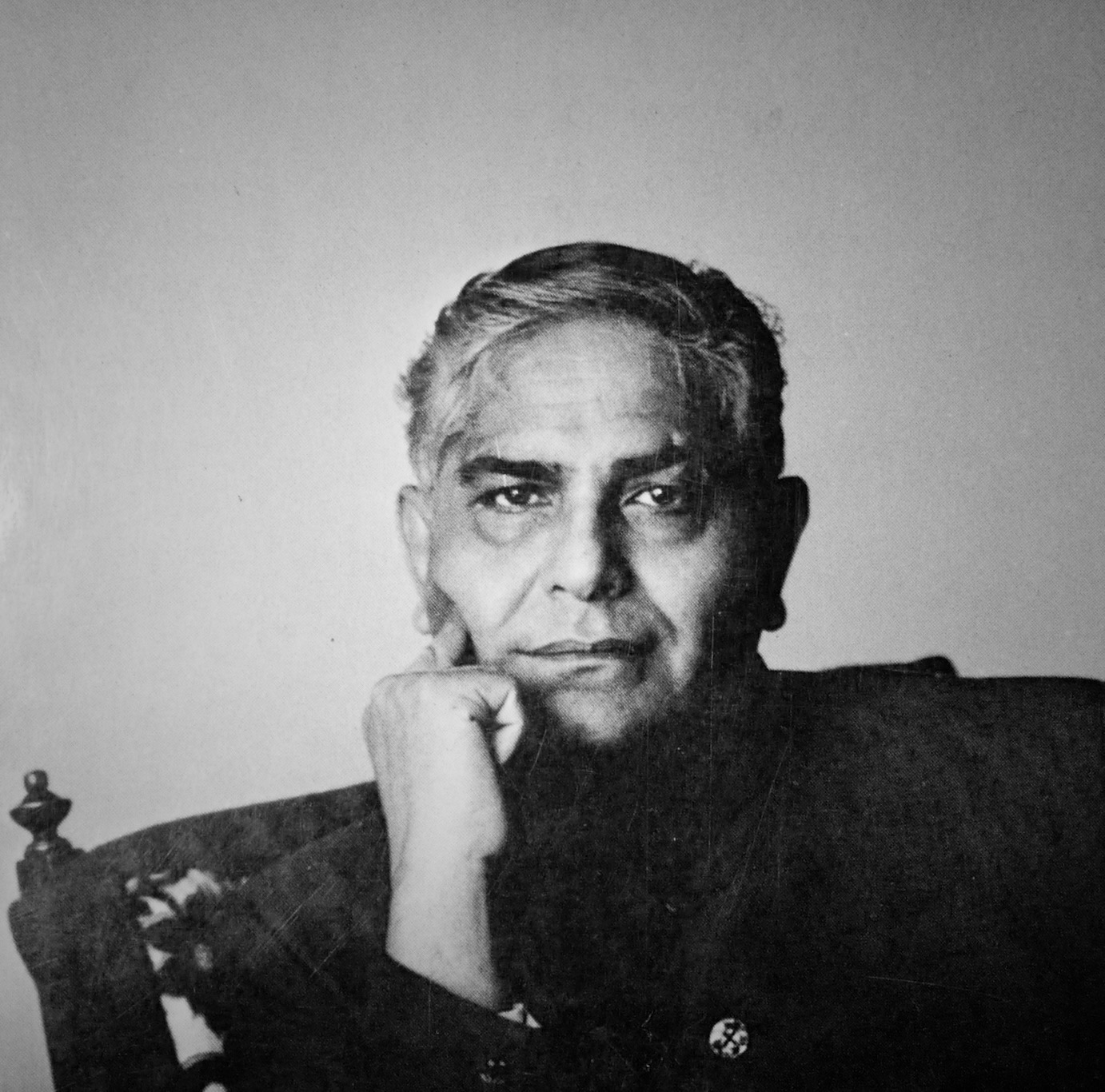
- Desani in 1970
- Born: Govindas Vishnoodas Dasani; 8 July 1909; Nairobi, Kenya
- Died: 15 November 2000 (aged 91); Fort Worth, Texas
- Citizenship: U.S.
- Education: Autodidactic (expelled, age 13)
- Occupations: Author, educator
- Writing career
- Language: English, Hindi, Urdu, Sindhi, Sanskrit, Pali
- Genres: Novel, short story, essay, lecture
- Notable works: All About H. Hatterr (1948, 1951, 1970, 1972, 1982, 1985, 1986, 1998, 2007, 2018, 2020 [German].); Hali: A Play (1952); Hali and Collected Stories (1991)

Govindas Vishnoodas Desani (1909–2000), known as G.V. Desani, was a British-Indian journalist, lecturer, writer and educator. Desani is best known for his novel All About H. Hatterr, first published in Great Britain in 1948, which cast an absurdist, comedic light on the plight of a common man in a multicultural, pan-ethnic world.

Hatterr is notable for its many revised editions and attendant reviews received over seven decades which describe the book as … "a genuine literary rarity, the lost-and-found masterpiece," "a lost classic", and, of the author, an "elusive talent of the Fifties."

Post 40, Desani became a seeker, devotee, adept, reporter and lecturer on ancient Indian traditions — including obscure mantric and tantric crafts — to Eastern and Western audiences.

== Bibliography ==
=== All About H. Hatterr ===
The 1948 publication of Desani's mock-heroic novel, with its high-velocity East-West pitter-patter, attracted widespread attention. T.S. Eliot said of it, "… In all my experience, I have not met with anything quite like it. It is amazing that anyone should be able to sustain a piece of work in this style and tempo at such length." Orville Prescott, in a mixed review in The New York Times wrote, "... To describe a rainbow to a child born blind would not be much more difficult than to describe the unique character of All About H. Hatterr ... as startling as a unicorn in the hall bedroom. Reading it issues dizzy spells, spots before the eyes, consternation, and even thought." Four decades later Salman Rushdie wrote "Hatterr's dazzling, puzzling, leaping prose is the first genuine effort to go beyond the Englishness of the English language."

=== Hali: A Play ===
Desani's Hali: A Play was published and performed in 1950. It was described by Eliot as "completely different from Hatterr." Eliot and E.M. Forster contributed forewords to the 55-page lyrical tragedy. Eliot called Hali's imagery "... often terrifyingly effective," while Forster wrote, "... it keeps evoking heights above the 'Summit-City' of normal achievement." Other of their comments were less enthusiastic. Eliot added, "Hali is not likely to appeal quickly to the taste of many readers." And Forster observed, "It depends upon a private mythology – a dangerous device."

=== Hali and Short Stories ===
In 1991, Hali was re-published in Hali and Collected Stories.

== Biography ==
Desani was born in Kenya into a Sindhi Indian family that had a general store, specializing in wood fuel. The family moved back to Sindh (now part of Pakistan) when he was about eight. Desani described himself as a rebellious child. He ran away from home three times and was, at the age of 13, expelled from school. Fleeing an arranged marriage, Desani at age 15 or 16 caught a steamer for the UK.

He arrived in England speaking only Hindi but within a couple of years had mastered English to the point that he was befriended by several prominent Londoners. For example, he was recommended by George Lansbury MP, Deputy Leader of the Labour Party, for admission as a reader to the British Museum Library.

=== Career ===
In the 1930s Desani worked as a film extra, an artists' model and as a correspondent for The Times of India, Reuters and the Associated Press, among others, contributing from both Great Britain and India. During World War II, Desani lectured in both English and Hindustani for the British Ministry of Information and the Imperial Institute. He was also a regular BBC commentator. Recalling his popularity as a lecturer during the war, Anthony Burgess wrote, "Desani came to England, in fact, to demonstrate in live speech the vitality of the British rhetorical tradition, brilliant in Burke and Macaulay, decadent in Churchill, now dead."

==== Search for Spiritual Knowledge ====
Decades later, Desani recounted how — despite his achievements — he became increasingly unhappy. In 1952 he returned to India where he sought out a series of gurus and fakirs. These teachers, typically residing in rural Indian villages, assigned him arduous disciplines, often requiring months of intense Sādhanā.

Desani spent most of 1960 in Rangoon (now Yangon) practicing Samatha-vipassana under Theravada Buddhist master Mahasi Sayadaw. Upon completion, he was asked to address the Burmese diplomatic corps on Buddhist ethics and techniques. The meeting took place at the Israeli embassy; Burmese Justice U Chan Htoon presided.

==== Social and political commentary ====
From 1962-67 Desani made frequent contributions to The Illustrated Weekly of India. His articles included short stories, and commentary on Indian social and cultural issues, ethics, religion and occultism. An unsigned weekly column entitled "Very High & Very Low" ran from 1964-66.

==== Academic career ====
In 1967 a Fulbright Program grant brought Desani to the University of Texas, Austin as a lecturer on Eastern Philosophy. In 1969 he joined the faculty as a full professor (notably Desani never graduated from high school and had no college). From 1970-79, Desani taught courses in Theravada Buddhism and other yoga traditions. He retired in 1982 following a semester as a Boston University lecturer under the sponsorship of then B.U. president John Silber.

In his last years as a professor emeritus at UT Austin Desani hoped to write two more books: an autobiography and a book based on journal entries he made during his years investigating Nadi astrology and other occult crafts in India.

Desani died at the age of 91 in Fort Worth, Texas.

== Principal Works ==
=== Novels ===
- Desani, G.V. (1970) [1948]. All About H. Hatterr (hardback). London: The Bodley Head. ISBN 0-370-01424-3.
- All About H. Hatterr First Edition; minor revisions
  - Aldor Press, London 1948
  - Saturn Press, London 1950
  - Farrar, Straus & Young, New York 1951
  - The Bodley Head, London, 1970
  - Farrar, Straus & Giroux, New York 1970
- All About H. Hatterr with an eighth chapter.
  - Lancer Books, New York 1972
  - Penguin Modern Classics, Penguin Books, London 1972
  - Penguin Books, King Penguin Series, Harmondsworth 1982
  - Arnold Heinemann, New Delhi 1985
  - McPherson & Co., New York 1986
  - Penguin Books India, Ltd., New Delhi 1998
  - The New York Review of Books 2007
  - Aleph Classics, New Delhi 2018
  - Alles über Herrn H. Hatterr, Büchergilde Gutenberg, Frankfurt 2020

=== Plays ===
- Hali: A Play First Edition; minor revisions
  - Hali: A Play, Saturn Press, London 1950
  - Hali, The Illustrated Weekly of India 1964
  - Hali: A Poem-Play, Writer's Workshop, Calcutta, India 1967

=== Short story collection ===
- Desani, G.V. (1991). Hali and Collected Stories (hardback). Kingston, New York: McPherson & Company. ISBN 0-929701-12-7.

=== Major Short Stories ===
- A Border Incident
- A New Bridge of Plenty
- Abdullah Haii
- Correspondence with Sister Jay
- Country Life, Country Folk, Cobras, Thok!
- Down with Philosophy 1979
- Gipsy Jim Brazil to Kumari Kishino
- Goan, Meet a Samoan! 1964
- In Memoriam
- Mephisto's Daughter
- Rudyard Kipling's Evaluation of His Own Mother
- Since a Nation Must Export, Smithers!
- Sutta Abandoned
- The Barber of Sahibsarai
- The Fiend Screams 'Kya Chahate Ho? 1967
- The Lama Arupa
- The Last Long Letter 1967
- The Mandatory Interview with the Dean
- The Merchant of Kisingarh 1983
- The Pansari's Account of the Incident
- The Second Mrs. was Wed in a Nightmare
- The Valley of Lions
- This Shrub, This Child of God
- With Malice Aforethought

=== Columns ===
- Very High & Very Low, Illustrated Weekly of India 1963-66 (unsigned)
- No Reason, No Rhyme, Illustrated Weekly of India 1963-66

=== Notable Commentary ===
- Varanasi: An Impression 1964
- Indian Affairs, an Appraisal in Two Parts 1964
- Jawaharlal Nehru: An Assessment 1965
- How Is the Inexpressible To Be Expressed? 1970
- An Indian View of God, Cosmos, Love, Marriage, Sex, etc. 1971
- Mostly Concerning Kama and Her Immortal Lord 1973
- I Believe 1969
- Rudyard Kipling's Evaluation of His Mother 1976
- Down with Philosophy, Boston University Journal 1979
- A Passage to Mid-West U.S.A. — Fly High to Chicago! 1979
- Peanut Cum Sale, Department of Religion, Boston University 1979
- India For the Plain Hell of It, The New Yorker, India Issue 1997
- JFK As I Saw Him, 1964
- Guru Parampara
- The Nadi Shastra
- Mantra and Tantra
- Sri Ramakrishna Paramahamsa 1966
- A No-Image Image
- The Incredible Baba Visvanath

=== Published Lectures ===
- India Invites New College, Oxford and Trinity, Cambridge 1941
- Patanjala Yoga Philosophy, Rhodes House, Oxford
- Yoga and Vipassana Meditation, Israel Embassy, Rangoon, Burma 1961
- Certain Techniques of Yoga and Meditation Karachi Theosophical Society 1962
- Ethics, Nirvana and Sundry Items, Kishinchand Chellaram College, Mumbai 1968
- Indian Occultism, University of Chicago 1968
- The Benares That Was, ANON 1970
- Indian Cultural Values Versus the Western Cultural Values, Embassy of India, Moscow, U.S.S.R. 1970
- Techniques In All About H. Hatterr, University of Sussex 1970
- How Does Crisis in Civilization Affect India?, University of Texas, Austin 1971
- Bhakti Yoga, Southwestern Conference on Asian Studies, University of Houston 1975
- An Imageless Image, Symposium in Comparative World Humanities, Michigan State University 1976
- Difficulties of Communicating an Oriental to a Western Audience, Association of Commonwealth Literature and Language Studies, Jawaharlal University, New Delhi, January, 1977; Sterling Publishers, New Delhi 1978
- The Novel as Gesture, Sterling Publishers, New Delhi 1978
- A Marginal Comment on the Problem of Medium in Bi-cultures, Associations of Commonwealth Literature and Languages Studies, University of Malta 1978; University Press 1979
- Banares, City of God, Boston Institute of Religion and Philosophy 1979
- On Civil Disobedience (As a Means of Attaining Social and Political Ends as Practiced in South Africa and India Under the Leadership of M.K. Gandhi), Boston University 1979
- Has India Anything To Teach to the United States, Boston University 1979

=== Anthologies ===
- The Yellow Textbook of Theravada Buddhism, editor and contributor, Cedarbrook Press, Austin (1973)
  - Instruction in Buddhist Technique of Mental Culture, G.V. Desani
  - A Note on the Doctrine of Anatta and the Boddhisattva Ideal, G.V. Desani
