= Coldiron =

Coldiron or cold iron or cold Fe may refer to:

- Cold iron, historically believed to repel ghosts, fairies, and other supernatural creatures
- "Cold Iron" (poem), a 1910 poem by Rudyard Kipling
- Cold Iron (video game), 2018
- Cold ironing, the process of providing shoreside electrical power to a ship at berth
- "Cold Irons Bound", a 1997 song by Bob Dylan
- Coldiron, Kentucky, United States
