= Burwash =

Village and parish in East Sussex, England

Coordinates: 51.00°N 0.39°E

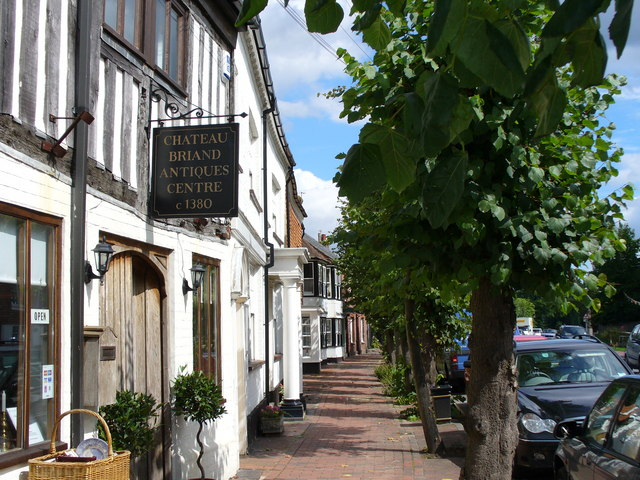
- Burwash High Street

- Location within East Sussex
- Area: 30.1 km^{2} (11.6 sq mi)
- Population: 2,713 (2011)
  - Density: 217/sq mi (84/km^{2})
- OS grid reference: TQ675247
  - London: 41 miles (66 km) NNW
- District: Rother
- Shire county: East Sussex
- Region: South East
- Country: England
- Sovereign state: United Kingdom
- Post town: ETCHINGHAM
- Postcode district: TN19
- Dialling code: 01435
- Police: Sussex
- Fire: East Sussex
- Ambulance: South East Coast
- UK Parliament: Bexhill and Battle

Burwash, archaically known as Burghersh, is a rural village and civil parish in the Rother district of East Sussex, England. Situated in the High Weald of Sussex some 15 miles (24 km) inland from the port of Hastings, it is located five miles (8.0 km) south-west of Hurst Green, on the A265 road, and on the River Dudwell, a tributary of the River Rother. In an area steeped in history, some nine miles (14 km) to the south-east lies Battle Abbey and eight miles (13 km) to the east is Bodiam Castle.

Its main claim to fame is that for half of his life Rudyard Kipling (1865–1936) lived in the village at Bateman's. Kipling used the house's setting and the wider local area as the setting for many of his stories in Puck of Pook's Hill (1906) and the sequel Rewards and Fairies (1910), and there is a Kipling room at "The Bear" public house, one of two pubs located along Burwash High Street. Rudyard's son, John Kipling, died during the First World War and is named on the village war memorial at the end of Bell Alley Lane. He was named after Rudyard's father, the artist John Lockwood Kipling, (1837–1911), who provided illustrations for The Jungle Book. A complete collection of Kipling's works, including Just So Stories, Rewards and Fairies, The Man Who Would Be King and Kim, was published as the "Burwash Edition" (1941).

== History ==
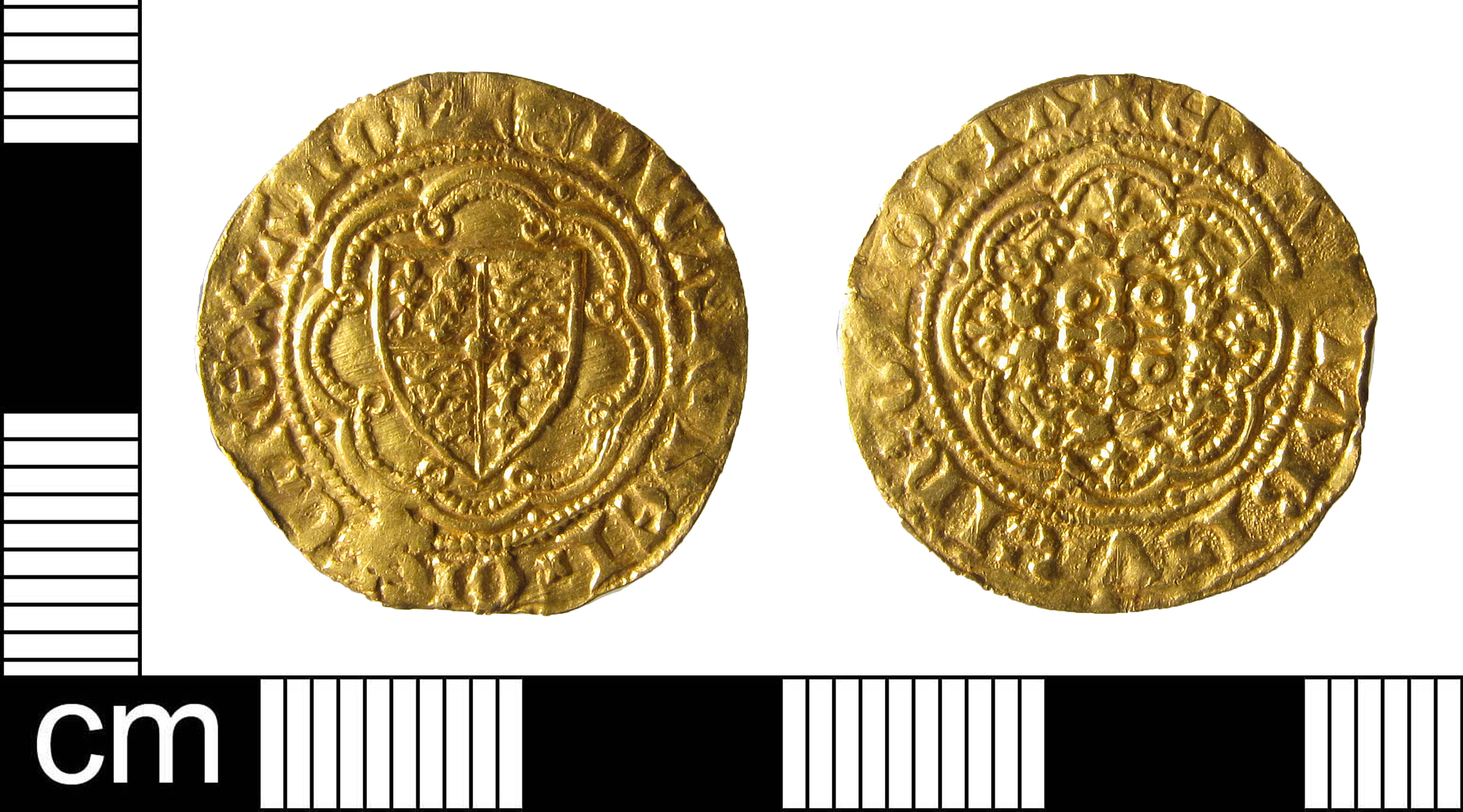
A gold quarter-noble coin of Edward III, dating from c. 1361 – c. 1363, found in Burwash

The village developed as a trading place when King Henry III authorised a weekly market in 1252. He also allowed a three-day fair in May. Smuggling took place in the 18th and 19th centuries, and several smugglers' graves can still be seen in the churchyard of St Bartholomew's.

The main road through Burwash, today's A265, was improved in the 18th and 19th centuries after it came under the administration of the Ringmer and Hurst Green turnpike trust. The trust was formed by the Hurst Green Road Act 1765 (5 Geo. 3. c. 64) after fifteen petitions were presented to Parliament on 25 December 1764 calling for the road to be turnpiked because it was stated to be "in many places impassable for wheeled conveyances in winter". The highway covered by the trust extended for 23 miles (37 km) across east Sussex from Ringmer, near Lewes, in the west, to Hurst Green in the east, where it met the principal turnpike road from London to Hastings (today's A21). The first section of road to be turnpiked ran from Hurst Green to Burwash; the rest followed three years later. A number of toll gates and bars were erected in the Burwash area on the principal highway and side roads. Although the trust repaired and improved the existing parish roads it was not until around 1830 that entirely new sections of main road were built, including one at Burwash Common. In a parliamentary return of 1840 the trust reported the roads it administered to be in good condition, with the exception of a short branch running from Burwash Common towards Stonegate. The trust was wound up in November 1864.

The road through Burwash was a notorious spot for highwaymen.

Burwash was one of the villages involved in the Wealden iron industry, and there was a forge located at Burwash Weald, close to the site of the historic "Wheel" public house.

A traditional marriage-rhyme includes the archaic pronunciation of the name: "To love and to cherish, / From Battle to Berrish, / And round about Robertsbridge home ..." ("Burrish" is a variant pronunciation mentioned in 1933).

== Landmarks ==
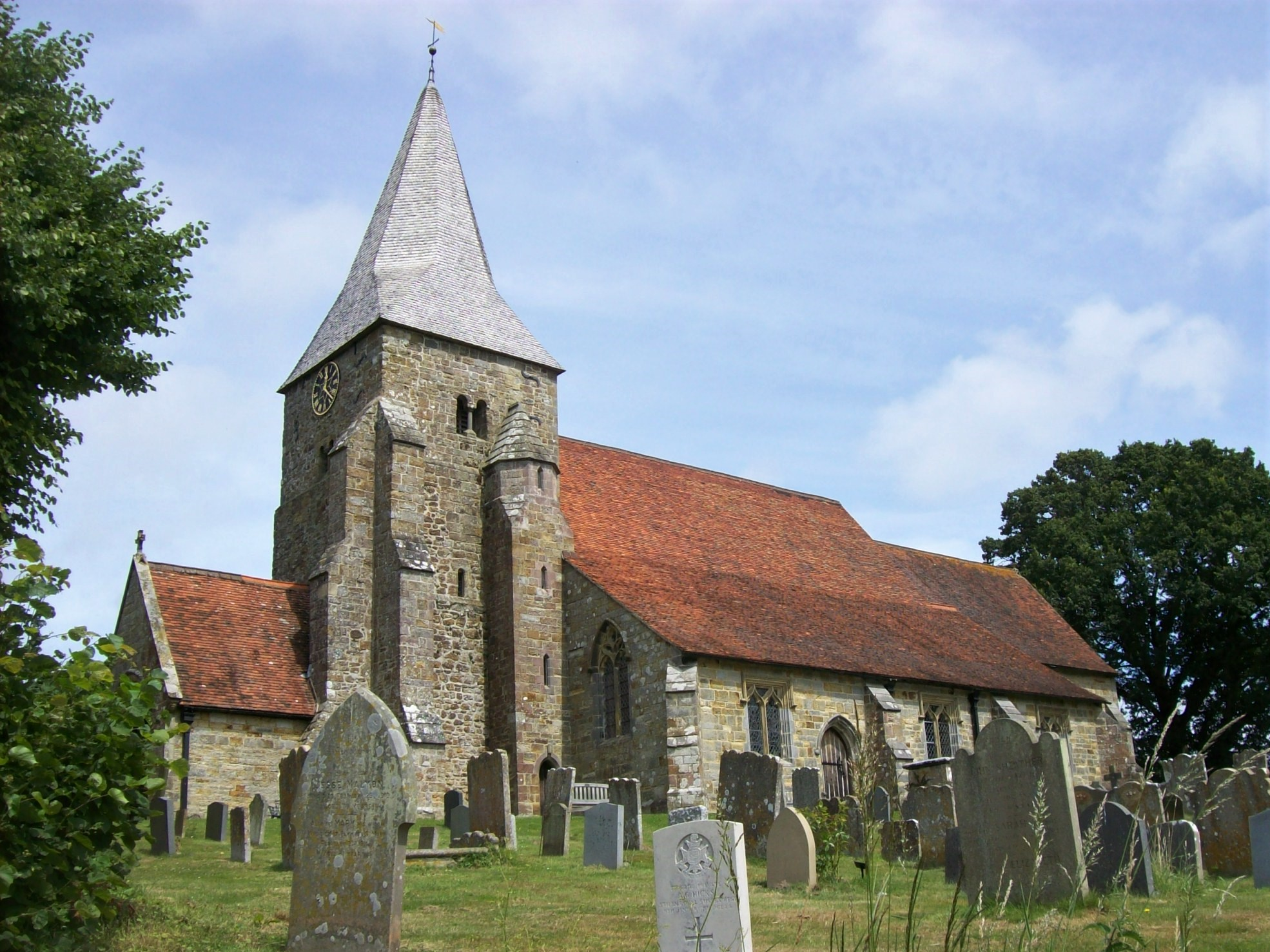
St Bartholomew's Church

St Bartholomew's Church is a Grade II* listed building.

The High Street has been designated a Conservation area by Rother District Council. The intention is to preserve the character of the village by strictly controlling building within the area. Additionally, the buildings along the High Street have been given listed building status by English Heritage, including a garden wall. The Bateman's mansion, a fine example of Jacobean architecture formerly owned by Rudyard Kipling, is now a National Trust property, open to the public. It can be found just outside the main village on the Burwash Weald and Common side, and is set within 33 acres (130,000 m^{2}) of the Sussex Weald, and includes a working watermill and millpond, which connects to the River Dudwell. The location was used while shooting the film My Boy Jack (2007), starring Daniel Radcliffe. A bronze statue of Kipling by the local sculptor Victoria Atkinson was installed in the High Street in 2019.

There is a Site of Special Scientific Interest within the parish—Dallington Forest, an area of ancient woodland. Its interest lies in a nationally rare habitat as a result of a steep-sided stream flowing through the site.

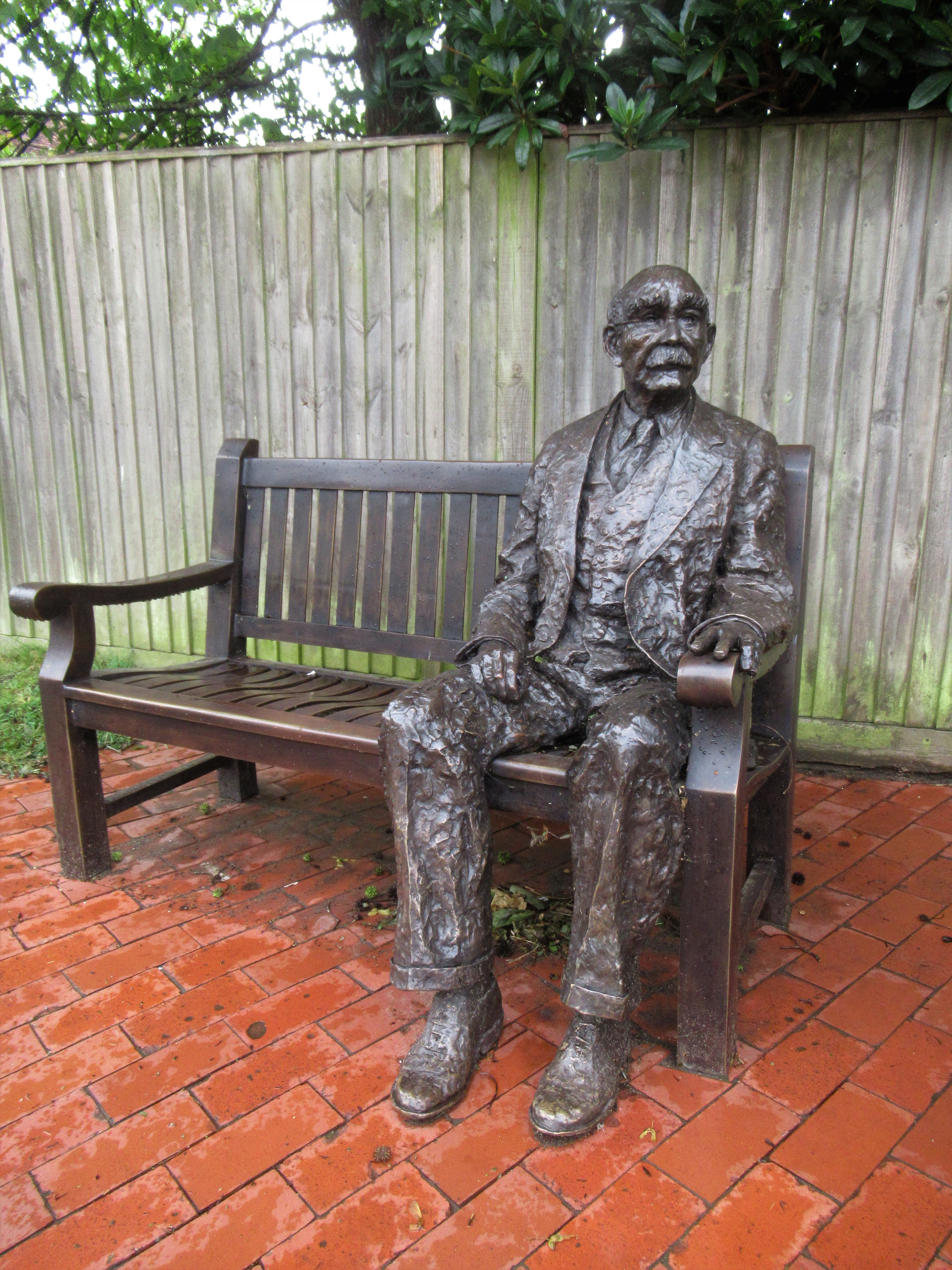
Statue of Rudyard Kipling on the High Street

Burwash is located within the High Weald Area of Outstanding Natural Beauty.

== Governance ==
The lowest level of government is the Burwash parish council, which meets once a month. The parish council is responsible for local amenities such as the provision of litter bins, bus shelters and allotments. It also provides a voice into the district council meetings. The parish council comprises thirteen councillors with elections being held every four years.

Rother District Council provides the next level of government with services such as refuse collection, planning consent, leisure amenities and council tax collection. Burwash lies within the Darwell ward, which provides two councillors.

East Sussex County Council is the third tier of government, providing education, libraries and highway maintenance. Burwash falls within the Rother North West ward.

The UK Parliament constituency for Burwash is Bexhill and Battle, which has been represented by Dr. Kieran Mullan since the 2024 general election.

== Notable people ==
As Kipling's main home, Bateman's was host to many notable visitors including fellow author Sir Henry Rider Haggard and Kipling's cousin Stanley Baldwin, who was Britain's Prime Minister from 1935 to 1937. Kingsley Amis visited Bateman's whilst preparing a tribute to Kipling (Amis's father was a resident of Burwash in the 1960s). Ex-Prime Minister James Callaghan lived just outside the village. Picture Post photographer Thurston Hopkins was educated at St Joseph's Salesian school in the village.

Cricketers Edward Hussey (1749–1816) and Albert Relf (1874–1937) were born here, The Who frontman Roger Daltrey maintains a Holmshurst Manor country estate and Lakedown fishery near Burwash Common, Robert Smith, singer and founding member of rock band The Cure is a resident.

== See also ==
Listed buildings in Burwash
