= Listed buildings in Burwash =

Civil Parish in East Sussex, England

Burwash is village and civil parish in the Rother district of East Sussex, England. It contains one grade I, six grade II* and 132 grade II listed buildings that are recorded in the National Heritage List for England.

This list is based on the information retrieved online from Historic England

== Listing ==
Name	Grade	Location	Type	Completed (Note: The date given is the date used by Historic England as significant for the initial building or that of an important part in the structure's description.)	Date designated	Grid ref. (Note: Sometimes known as OSGB36, the grid reference is based on the British national grid reference system used by the Ordnance Survey.) Geo-coordinates	Notes	Entry number (Note: The "List Entry Number" is a unique number assigned to each listed building and scheduled monument by Historic England.)	Image
Bateman's	I	Bateman's Lane			3 August 1961	TQ6709623794; 50°59′21″N 0°22′46″E		1044063	Bateman's More images
The Shop at Bateman's	II	Bateman's Lane			13 May 1987	TQ6707423796; 50°59′22″N 0°22′45″E		1044064	The Shop at Bateman's More images
Gates and Two Pairs of Gate Piers at Bateman's to the North East of the House	II	Bateman's Lane			3 August 1961	TQ6710823830; 50°59′23″N 0°22′47″E		1352935	Gates and Two Pairs of Gate Piers at Bateman's to the North East of the House More images
Park Mill	II	Bateman's Lane			13 May 1987	TQ6705323583; 50°59′15″N 0°22′44″E		1352936	Park Mill More images
Oast House, Park Mill	II	Bateman's Lane			13 May 1987	TQ6706523574; 50°59′14″N 0°22′44″E		1044065	Oast House, Park Mill More images
Barn Cum Oasthouse at Park Farm to the North East of the House	II	Bateman's Lane			20 May 1976	TQ6700323367; 50°59′08″N 0°22′41″E		1232544	Barn Cum Oasthouse at Park Farm to the North East of the House More images
Park Farmhouse	II	Bateman's Lane			13 May 1987	TQ6698823335; 50°59′07″N 0°22′40″E		1044066	Upload Photo
Old Dudwell Mill	II	Bell Alley Road			3 August 1961	TQ6767423860; 50°59′23″N 0°23′16″E		1352937	Upload Photo
Bines Farmhouse	II	Bivelham Road			13 May 1987	TQ6427826146; 51°00′40″N 0°20′25″E		1044067	Upload Photo
Great Bines	II	Bivelham Road			3 August 1961	TQ6435126113; 51°00′39″N 0°20′29″E		1232548	Upload Photo
Burwash Weald War Memorial	II	Burwash Weald			26 April 2019	TQ6401223654; 50°59′20″N 0°20′08″E		1462978	Upload Photo
Central Cottage	II	Etchingham			13 May 1987	TQ6749924708; 50°59′51″N 0°23′08″E		1044044	Upload Photo
Tott Cottages	II	1, 2 and 3, Etchingham Road			13 May 1987	TQ6860325223; 51°00′06″N 0°24′06″E		1232558	Upload Photo
Prospect Cottages	II	1-5, Etchingham Road			3 August 1961	TQ6787424928; 50°59′57″N 0°23′28″E		1044068	Upload Photo
Barn at Great Tott Farm to West of the Farmhouse	II	Etchingham Road			13 May 1987	TQ6866825254; 51°00′07″N 0°24′09″E		1232559	Upload Photo
Glebe Cottage Jasmine Cottage North View Cottage Rutland Cottage	II	Etchingham Road			13 May 1987	TQ6781024914; 50°59′57″N 0°23′25″E		1352938	Upload Photo
Glebe House	II*	Etchingham Road			3 August 1961	TQ6823024997; 50°59′59″N 0°23′46″E		1232557	Upload Photo
Great Tott Farmhouse	II	Etchingham Road			13 May 1987	TQ6871925256; 51°00′07″N 0°24′12″E		1044071	Upload Photo
Meadowlands	II	Etchingham Road			13 May 1987	TQ6849525200; 51°00′05″N 0°24′00″E		1044070	Upload Photo
The Old Police House	II	Etchingham Road			13 May 1987	TQ6779524900; 50°59′57″N 0°23′24″E		1232549	Upload Photo
Young's Garden	II	Etchingham Road			3 August 1961	TQ6793424948; 50°59′58″N 0°23′31″E		1044069	Upload Photo
Bowman's Farmhouse	II	Fontridge Lane			3 August 1961	TQ6809122957; 50°58′53″N 0°23′36″E		1044072	Upload Photo
Cockham Manor	II	Fontridge Lane			13 May 1987	TQ7056124628; 50°59′45″N 0°25′45″E		1044076	Upload Photo
Cottage at Bowman's Farm to the North East of the Barn	II	Fontridge Lane			13 May 1987	TQ6813722979; 50°58′54″N 0°23′38″E		1044073	Upload Photo
Fisher's Farmhouse	II	Fontridge Lane			13 May 1987	TQ7009724063; 50°59′27″N 0°25′20″E		1044075	Upload Photo
Fonthill Farmhouse	II	Fontridge Lane			13 May 1987	TQ6881723206; 50°59′01″N 0°24′13″E		1232561	Upload Photo
Fontridge Manor	II	Fontridge Lane			13 May 1987	TQ7037424649; 50°59′46″N 0°25′36″E		1232570	Upload Photo
Grandturzel Farmhouse	II	Fontridge Lane			13 May 1987	TQ6938924503; 50°59′42″N 0°24′45″E		1352939	Upload Photo
Hutchings	II	Fontridge Lane			13 May 1987	TQ7049024781; 50°59′50″N 0°25′42″E		1277016	Upload Photo
Old Brick Farmhouse	II	Fontridge Lane			13 May 1987	TQ6880823913; 50°59′24″N 0°24′14″E		1232562	Upload Photo
Perryman's Farmhouse	II	Fontridge Lane			3 August 1961	TQ6811322566; 50°58′41″N 0°23′36″E		1044092	Upload Photo
Phoebe's Cottage	II	Fontridge Lane			13 May 1987	TQ6865422874; 50°58′50″N 0°24′04″E		1277126	Upload Photo
Platt's Farmhouse	II	Fontridge Lane			3 August 1961	TQ6880923581; 50°59′13″N 0°24′14″E		1044074	Upload Photo
Two Oasthouses and Granary at Fontridge Manor to the North of the House	II	Fontridge Lane			13 May 1987	TQ7036724669; 50°59′46″N 0°25′35″E		1352940	Upload Photo
Barn at Parkhill Farm to the South of the Farmhouse	II	Foot's Lane			13 May 1987	TQ6478822482; 50°58′41″N 0°20′46″E		1232576	Upload Photo
Chandler's Farm	II	Foot's Lane			13 May 1987	TQ6478623088; 50°59′01″N 0°20′47″E		1277017	Upload Photo
Parkhill Farmhouse	II	Foot's Lane			28 July 1977	TQ6480122509; 50°58′42″N 0°20′46″E		1044077	Upload Photo
Barn at Bowman's Farm to North East of the Farmhouse	II	Frontridge Lane			3 August 1961	TQ6809922967; 50°58′54″N 0°23′36″E		1277013	Upload Photo
Almond Tree Cottage, Coach House, Cottage Everton, Cottages Lobbs, Cottage Mandalay Mole End	II	Ham Lane			3 August 1961	TQ6751824759; 50°59′52″N 0°23′09″E		1044053	Almond Tree Cottage, Coach House, Cottage Everton, Cottages Lobbs, Cottage Mandalay Mole End More images
Hoppers Croft the Cottage	II	Ham Lane			13 May 1987	TQ6751524777; 50°59′53″N 0°23′09″E		1277020	Upload Photo
The Rose and Crown Inn	II	Ham Lane			13 May 1987	TQ6749124772; 50°59′53″N 0°23′08″E		1352941	The Rose and Crown Inn More images
Bantree House	II	Heathfield Road			13 May 1987	TQ6460423282; 50°59′07″N 0°20′38″E		1352943	Upload Photo
Bright's Cottage	II	Heathfield Road			13 May 1987	TQ6355023358; 50°59′11″N 0°19′44″E		1044040	Upload Photo
Burnt House Farmhouse	II	Heathfield Road			13 May 1987	TQ6565823349; 50°59′09″N 0°21′32″E		1044080	Upload Photo
Green Farmhouse	II	Heathfield Road			13 May 1987	TQ6541223537; 50°59′15″N 0°21′19″E		1232595	Upload Photo
Hillside Cottage Paygate Cottage	II	Heathfield Road			13 May 1987	TQ6701924543; 50°59′46″N 0°22′43″E		1277021	Upload Photo
Paygate Cottage St Nicholas Cottage	II	Heathfield Road			13 May 1987	TQ6700524470; 50°59′43″N 0°22′43″E		1044078	Upload Photo
Rye Green	II	Heathfield Road			3 August 1961	TQ6640823491; 50°59′12″N 0°22′10″E		1044079	Upload Photo
Slutswell	II	Heathfield Road			13 May 1987	TQ6412623385; 50°59′11″N 0°20′13″E		1352962	Upload Photo
Witherhurst	II	Heathfield Road			13 May 1987	TQ6656324280; 50°59′38″N 0°22′20″E		1232587	Upload Photo
Victoria Terrace	II	2-5, High Street			13 May 1987	TQ6747824707; 50°59′51″N 0°23′07″E		1276969	Victoria Terrace More images
Alman House (I Karagelis Newsagent)	II	High Street			13 May 1987	TQ6738524708; 50°59′51″N 0°23′02″E		1352930	Upload Photo
Ashdown House Premises to the South Occupied By FJ Jarvis (Butcher)	II	High Street			13 May 1987	TQ6750424742; 50°59′52″N 0°23′09″E		1276875	Ashdown House Premises to the South Occupied By FJ Jarvis (Butcher) More images
Barn Joining Mount House on the West	II	High Street			3 August 1961	TQ6755824709; 50°59′51″N 0°23′11″E		1352926	Upload Photo
Beech House Sones Cottage	II	High Street			3 August 1961	TQ6769024789; 50°59′53″N 0°23′18″E		1232763	Upload Photo
Bower Cottage Dudwell Cottage Oak Beam Cottage	II	High Street			3 August 1961	TQ6758824763; 50°59′52″N 0°23′13″E		1044052	Bower Cottage Dudwell Cottage Oak Beam Cottage More images
Burghurst	II*	High Street			3 August 1961	TQ6763824778; 50°59′53″N 0°23′15″E		1044051	Burghurst More images
Burwash Post Office the National Westminster Bank	II	High Street			13 May 1987	TQ6749424739; 50°59′52″N 0°23′08″E		1044054	Burwash Post Office the National Westminster Bank More images
Charlton Cottage (C Waterhouse Funeral Director)	II	High Street			13 May 1987	TQ6731424688; 50°59′50″N 0°22′59″E		1372058	Charlton Cottage (C Waterhouse Funeral Director) More images
Chateaubriand Premises Occupied By E Watson and Sons Estate Agents Premises Occupied By E Workman Greengrocers Villiers	II*	High Street			3 August 1961	TQ6744324723; 50°59′51″N 0°23′05″E		1232850	Chateaubriand Premises Occupied By E Watson and Sons Estate Agents Premises Occupied By E Workman Greengrocers Villiers More images
Chaunt House	II	High Street			13 May 1987	TQ6746224701; 50°59′50″N 0°23′06″E		1352927	Chaunt House More images
Cherton	II	High Street			13 May 1987	TQ6723924681; 50°59′50″N 0°22′55″E		1276842	Cherton More images
Chestnut Cottage Willow Cottage	II	High Street			13 May 1987	TQ6731524668; 50°59′50″N 0°22′59″E		1232740	Chestnut Cottage Willow Cottage More images
Chilston House	II	High Street			3 August 1961	TQ6746524730; 50°59′51″N 0°23′07″E		1352929	Chilston House More images
Church House	II	High Street			3 August 1961	TQ6767924784; 50°59′53″N 0°23′18″E		1044050	Church House More images
Cobbler's Cottage	II	High Street			13 May 1987	TQ6729424667; 50°59′49″N 0°22′58″E		1044048	Cobbler's Cottage More images
Denes House	II	High Street			3 August 1961	TQ6763724737; 50°59′51″N 0°23′15″E		1352925	Denes House More images
Elizabeth's Shop With the House Attached Rover Cottage (Shop and House Attached)	II	High Street			3 August 1961	TQ6743424717; 50°59′51″N 0°23′05″E		1044055	Elizabeth's Shop With the House Attached Rover Cottage (Shop and House Attached) More images
Garden Wall of Denes House to the East of the House	II	High Street			13 May 1987	TQ6766424727; 50°59′51″N 0°23′17″E		1044042	Garden Wall of Denes House to the East of the House More images
Garstons	II	High Street			3 August 1961	TQ6774024806; 50°59′54″N 0°23′21″E		1352963	Garstons More images
Gideon House	II	High Street			13 May 1987	TQ6742224692; 50°59′50″N 0°23′04″E		1044046	Gideon House More images
Gregwood Kimberley the Cottage	II	High Street			13 May 1987	TQ6741024689; 50°59′50″N 0°23′04″E		1276932	Gregwood Kimberley the Cottage More images
Ivy Cottage Ivy House	II	High Street			3 August 1961	TQ6761524726; 50°59′51″N 0°23′14″E		1232603	Ivy Cottage Ivy House More images
Kim's Cottage	II	High Street			13 May 1987	TQ6697024454; 50°59′43″N 0°22′41″E		1352942	Upload Photo
Lime Cottage, Swan Inn House, the Cygnet, the Old Granary, Yew Tree House	II	High Street			3 August 1961	TQ6755724758; 50°59′52″N 0°23′11″E		1352928	Lime Cottage, Swan Inn House, the Cygnet, the Old Granary, Yew Tree House More images
Linden Cottage	II	High Street			3 August 1961	TQ6760724765; 50°59′52″N 0°23′14″E		1276920	Linden Cottage More images
Mount House Mount House Cottage	II	High Street			3 August 1961	TQ6757824724; 50°59′51″N 0°23′12″E		1232668	Mount House Mount House Cottage More images
Novar Providence Cottage Wayside	II	High Street			13 May 1987	TQ6723724659; 50°59′49″N 0°22′55″E		1044049	Novar Providence Cottage Wayside More images
Numbers 1 and 2 South Side	II	High Street			13 May 1987	TQ6745224694; 50°59′50″N 0°23′06″E		1232718	Numbers 1 and 2 South Side More images
Numbers 1-3 Rose Cottages	II	High Street			13 May 1987	TQ6726624662; 50°59′49″N 0°22′56″E		1276914	Upload Photo
Peartony Staronley	II	High Street			13 May 1987	TQ6729624686; 50°59′50″N 0°22′58″E		1039980	Peartony Staronley More images
Pope's Cottage Sadlers (Antiques)	II	High Street			13 May 1987	TQ6743424693; 50°59′50″N 0°23′05″E		1044045	Pope's Cottage Sadlers (Antiques) More images
Rampyndene	II	High Street			3 August 1961	TQ6760424726; 50°59′51″N 0°23′14″E		1044043	Rampyndene More images
Revenue Cottage, Shadwell Row Shadwell Cottage, Shadwell Row Smugglers, Shadwell Row the Highway Cottage, Shadwell Row Timbers, Shadwell Row	II	High Street			3 August 1961	TQ6740924710; 50°59′51″N 0°23′04″E		1276885	Revenue Cottage, Shadwell Row Shadwell Cottage, Shadwell Row Smugglers, Shadwell Row the Highway Cottage, Shadwell Row Timbers, Shadwell Row More images
St Anthony's	II	High Street			3 August 1961	TQ6754524752; 50°59′52″N 0°23′11″E		1232813	St Anthony's More images
The Admiral Vernon Public House	II	High Street			13 May 1987	TQ6782424914; 50°59′57″N 0°23′25″E		1277011	Upload Photo
The Bear Hotel	II	High Street			13 May 1987	TQ6738724681; 50°59′50″N 0°23′02″E		1044047	The Bear Hotel More images
The Bell Inn	II	High Street			3 August 1961	TQ6765724786; 50°59′53″N 0°23′16″E		1232764	The Bell Inn More images
The Corn Stores (FT Farley's Premises)	II	High Street			3 August 1961	TQ6747624733; 50°59′51″N 0°23′07″E		1232842	The Corn Stores (FT Farley's Premises) More images
The Corner House (Penelope Claire Womens Dress Shop) The Corner House (The Lime Tree)	II	High Street			13 May 1987	TQ6732724694; 50°59′50″N 0°22′59″E		1352931	The Corner House (Penelope Claire Womens Dress Shop) The Corner House (The Lime Tree) More images
The Gift (Now Part of the Stores)	II	High Street			13 May 1987	TQ6736424703; 50°59′51″N 0°23′01″E		1044056	Upload Photo
The Nook Yaxley	II	High Street			13 May 1987	TQ6750424713; 50°59′51″N 0°23′09″E		1276962	Upload Photo
The Parish Church of St Bartholomew	II*	High Street			3 August 1961	TQ6771524748; 50°59′52″N 0°23′19″E	Norman W tower, C14 shingled broach spire. Substantially rebuilt 1855-6. Cast iron tomb slab to Jhone Coline, died 1537.	1044041	The Parish Church of St Bartholomew More images
The Stores (AE Manley)	II	High Street			13 May 1987	TQ6737224706; 50°59′51″N 0°23′02″E		1276889	The Stores (AE Manley) More images
The White House	II	High Street			3 August 1961	TQ6735824704; 50°59′51″N 0°23′01″E		1044057	The White House More images
Tudor Cottage Tudor House	II	High Street			3 August 1961	TQ6734724701; 50°59′51″N 0°23′00″E		1232872	Tudor Cottage Tudor House More images
Wren Cottage	II	High Street			13 May 1987	TQ6725824681; 50°59′50″N 0°22′56″E		1372059	Wren Cottage More images
Horsebrooks Farmhouse	II	Ludpit Lane			13 May 1987	TQ7128324324; 50°59′34″N 0°26′22″E		1276847	Upload Photo
The Cottage	II	Ludpit Lane			13 May 1987	TQ7138624319; 50°59′34″N 0°26′27″E		1232933	Upload Photo
The Old House	II*	Ludpit Lane			3 August 1961	TQ7141424331; 50°59′34″N 0°26′28″E		1276843	Upload Photo
Willard's Hill	II	Ludpit Lane			13 May 1987	TQ7137424331; 50°59′34″N 0°26′26″E		1232932	Upload Photo
Willard's Hill Farmhouse	II	Ludpit Lane			13 May 1987	TQ7144924356; 50°59′35″N 0°26′30″E		1232934	Upload Photo
Clovelly	II	1 and 2 (Clovelly) , School Hill			3 August 1961	TQ6767724704; 50°59′50″N 0°23′17″E		1276848	Clovelly More images
The Old House	II	3, School Hill			3 August 1961	TQ6768924693; 50°59′50″N 0°23′18″E		1276844	The Old House More images
The Old Thatch and Chime Cottage	II	4, School Hill			3 August 1961	TQ6771224668; 50°59′49″N 0°23′19″E		1232935	The Old Thatch and Chime Cottage More images
Bellcroft and Fairview	II	School Hill			13 May 1987	TQ6774524679; 50°59′49″N 0°23′21″E		1232942	Upload Photo
51 and 53 Shrub Lane	II	51 and 53, Shrub Lane			13 May 1987	TQ6810325546; 51°00′17″N 0°23′41″E		1276828	Upload Photo
Crowhurst Bridge Farmhouse	II	Shrub Lane			13 May 1987	TQ6841426256; 51°00′40″N 0°23′58″E		1232980	Upload Photo
Square Farmhouse	II	Shrub Lane			3 August 1961	TQ6778724976; 50°59′59″N 0°23′23″E		1276850	Upload Photo
Woodrising	II	Shrub Lane			13 May 1987	TQ6821825828; 51°00′26″N 0°23′47″E		1232979	Upload Photo
Franchise Lodge	II	Spring Lane			13 May 1987	TQ6624125251; 51°00′09″N 0°22′05″E		1276831	Upload Photo
Franchise Manor	II	Spring Lane			13 May 1987	TQ6640425727; 51°00′25″N 0°22′14″E		1232983	Upload Photo
Franchise Oast	II	Spring Lane			13 May 1987	TQ6621725643; 51°00′22″N 0°22′04″E		1232984	Upload Photo
Mottynsden Manor	II	Spring Lane			3 August 1961	TQ6665825312; 51°00′11″N 0°22′26″E		1276830	Upload Photo
Mottynsden Oast	II	Spring Lane			13 May 1987	TQ6662425253; 51°00′09″N 0°22′24″E		1232982	Upload Photo
Numbers 1 and 2 Holton Cottage	II	Spring Lane			13 May 1987	TQ6650825017; 51°00′02″N 0°22′18″E		1232981	Upload Photo
The Cottage	II	Spring Lane			13 May 1987	TQ6655524998; 51°00′01″N 0°22′20″E		1276829	Upload Photo
Witherenden Hill	II	Ticehurst Hill			13 May 1987	TQ6488826458; 51°00′50″N 0°20′57″E		1276835	Upload Photo
Thatchers Barn	II	1 and 2, Ticehurst Road			13 May 1987	TQ6472025967; 51°00′34″N 0°20′48″E		1233023	Upload Photo
Black House Cottages South East of Witherenden Stores	II	Ticehurst Road			13 May 1987	TQ6485626336; 51°00′46″N 0°20′55″E		1232988	Upload Photo
Fairways Fairways Cottage	II	Ticehurst Road			13 May 1987	TQ6484426404; 51°00′48″N 0°20′55″E		1233025	Upload Photo
Holmhurst	II	Ticehurst Road			3 August 1961	TQ6436025464; 51°00′18″N 0°20′29″E		1233008	Upload Photo
Holmshurst Cottages	II	Ticehurst Road			13 May 1987	TQ6447925544; 51°00′21″N 0°20′35″E		1276833	Upload Photo
Kestrels	II	Ticehurst Road			13 May 1987	TQ6431325712; 51°00′26″N 0°20′27″E		1276809	Upload Photo
Pear Tree Cottage	II	Ticehurst Road			13 May 1987	TQ6451625602; 51°00′23″N 0°20′37″E		1232986	Upload Photo
Pont's Farmhouse	II	Ticehurst Road			13 May 1987	TQ6450824883; 50°59′59″N 0°20′35″E		1276832	Upload Photo
Two Oasthouses and Granary (Now A Garage) At Holmhurst to North East of the House	II	Ticehurst Road			13 May 1987	TQ6439125481; 51°00′19″N 0°20′30″E		1232985	Upload Photo
Two Oasthouses and Granary at Woodknowle Farm to the North East of the Farmhouse	II	Ticehurst Road			13 May 1987	TQ6535526010; 51°00′35″N 0°21′20″E		1232987	Upload Photo
Witherenden Cottages	II	Ticehurst Road			13 May 1987	TQ6483626378; 51°00′47″N 0°20′54″E		1276834	Upload Photo
Woodknowle Farmhouse	II	Ticehurst Road			3 August 1961	TQ6529025992; 51°00′34″N 0°21′17″E		1276810	Upload Photo
Poundsford Farmhouse	II	Vicarage Lane			13 May 1987	TQ6366622520; 50°58′44″N 0°19′48″E		1276788	Upload Photo
Westdown	II	Westdown Lane			13 May 1987	TQ6441622258; 50°58′35″N 0°20′26″E		1232989	Upload Photo
Little Park Hill	II	Willingford Lane			13 May 1987	TQ6519823104; 50°59′01″N 0°21′08″E		1276790	Upload Photo
Little Willingford	II	Willingford Lane			13 May 1987	TQ6560622645; 50°58′46″N 0°21′28″E		1233063	Upload Photo
Mousehole Farmhouse	II	Willingford Lane			13 May 1987	TQ6536322961; 50°58′56″N 0°21′16″E		1232990	Upload Photo
Perch Hill Farmhouse	II	Willingford Lane			13 May 1987	TQ6655422137; 50°58′28″N 0°22′16″E		1232991	Upload Photo
Burwash War Memorial	II*				25 August 1998	TQ6765424754; 50°59′52″N 0°23′16″E		1376156	Burwash War Memorial More images
Glaziers Forge Cottage	II				25 July 2003	TQ6500921250; 50°58′01″N 0°20′55″E		1390534	Upload Photo

== See also ==
- Grade I listed buildings in East Sussex#Rother
- Grade II* listed buildings in Rother

== Sources ==
- Antram, Nicholas; Pevsner, Nikolaus (2012) [1965], Sussex: East, The Buildings of England, New Haven and London: Yale University Press, ISBN 978-0-300-18473-0
