= Kipling House =

Kipling House may refer to

- Kipling House in Villiers Street in London, part of which was briefly the home of Rudyard Kipling in his younger days
- Bateman's, a mansion in East Sussex in England that was the home of Rudyard Kipling in his later years
- One of several boarding houses at Haileybury and Imperial Service College, a private school in England

== See also ==
- Sir J. J. Institute of Applied Art, site of the Kipling Bungalow in Mumbai (Bombay), India
