= Holmshurst Manor =

Country house in East Sussex, England

Coordinates: 51.004837°N 0.341429°E

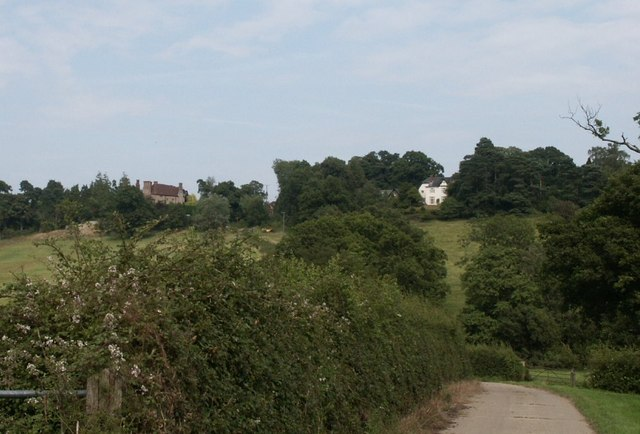
Holmshurst (left) from Farm Lane

Holmshurst Manor is a Jacobean country house near Burwash in East Sussex, England. In 1970 it was purchased by Roger Daltrey of the Who.

== Description ==
Holmshurst lies north of Burwash Common, near Witherenden Hill, and is surrounded by farm land. The house is built of brick with stone dressings and has twenty rooms and seven bedrooms. It features a tiled roof, clustered chimneys, stone fireplaces, stained glass windows, oak paneling and a gallery seventy feet in length. Daltrey maintained the Jacobean style of the house, but also installed a sauna and Persian carpets. In the mid-1970s Daltrey designed and built Lakedown Fishery on the manor farm, and also installed a recording studio in one of the barns.

The grounds include a number of outbuildings, including two oast houses, meant for drying hops as part of the process for brewing beer, and a granary which Daltrey converted to a garage. The manor house, oast houses and granary are listed as Grade II historical structures by English Heritage. Two cottages on the property are also listed at Grade II.

Oast House at Holmshurst

== History ==
Holmshurst Manor was built by Goddard Hepden (Hebden) in 1610 and bears his initials "GH" carved in a coat-of-arms on the lintel. Hepden was born in Burwash in about 1550, the son of John Hepden and Joan Wenham. He married Anne Frye, born in about 1552 in Ringmer, the daughter of Nicholas and Elizabeth Frye. The couple married in around 1580 and raised twelve children.
