= Invictus =

1888 poem by William Ernest Henley

- by William Ernest Henley
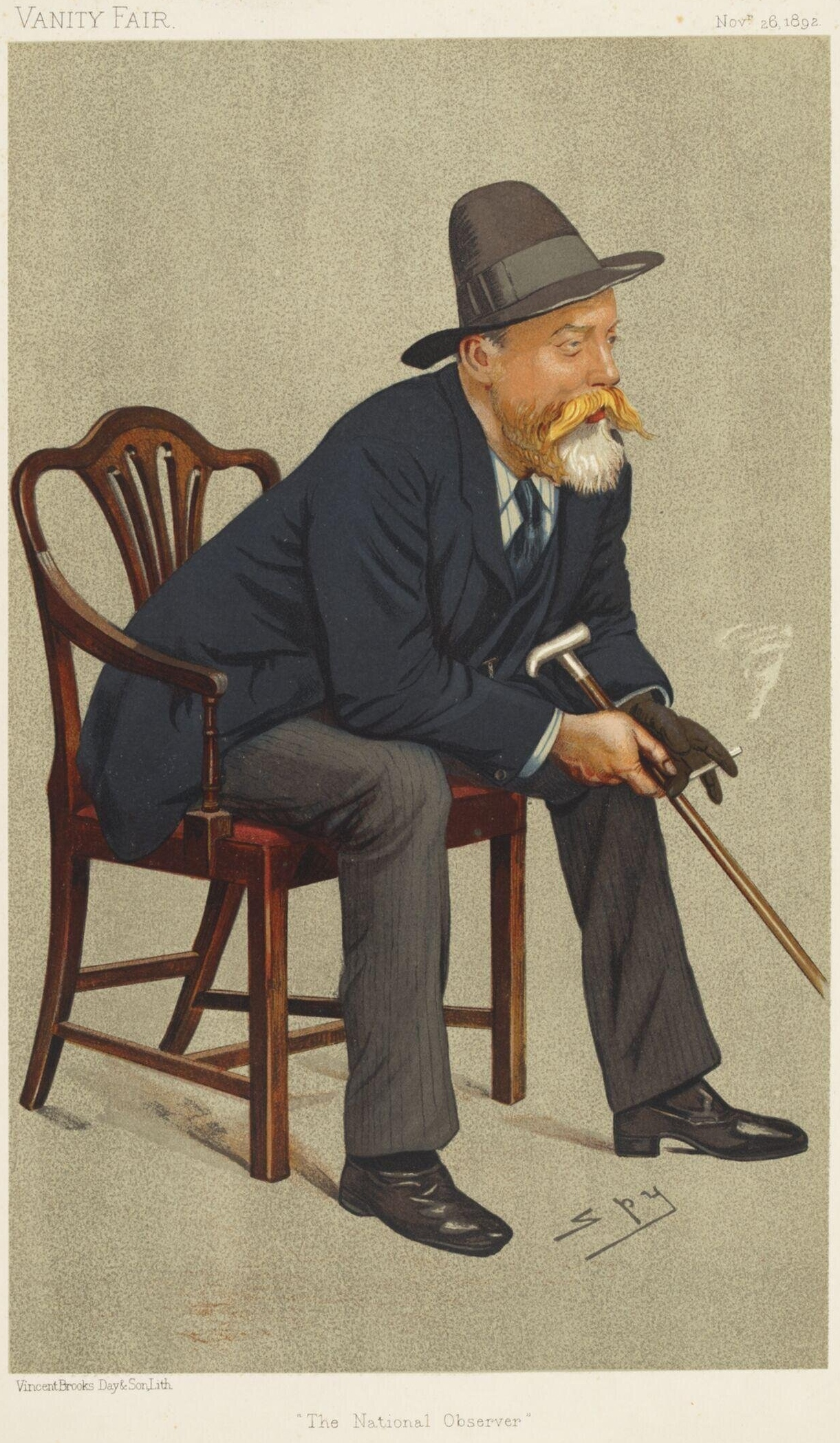
- Portrait of William Ernest Henley by Leslie Ward, published in Vanity Fair, 26 November 1892.
- Written: 1875
- Country: United Kingdom
- Genre: Victorian lyric poetry

"Invictus" is a short poem by English poet William Ernest Henley. Henley wrote it in 1875, and in 1888 he published it in his first volume of poems, Book of Verses, in the section titled "Life and Death (Echoes)".

== Background ==
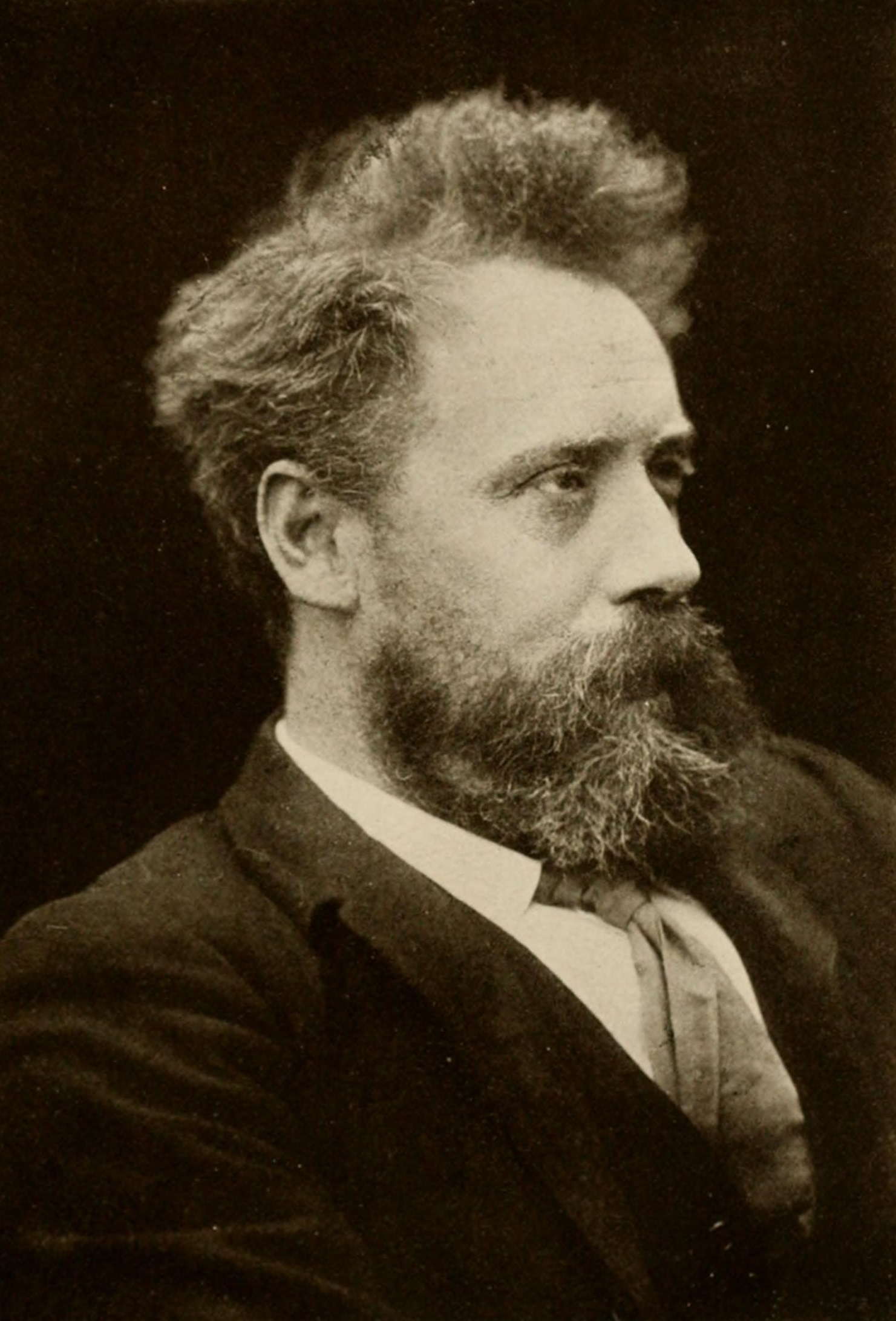
William Ernest Henley (terminus ante quem 1903)

When Henley was 16 years old, his left leg required amputation below the knee owing to complications arising from tuberculosis. In the early 1870s, after seeking treatment for problems with his other leg at Margate, he was told that it would require a similar procedure.

He instead chose to travel to Edinburgh in August 1873 to enlist the services of distinguished English surgeon Joseph Lister, who was able to save Henley's remaining leg after multiple surgical interventions on the foot. While recovering in the infirmary, he was moved to write the verses that became the poem "Invictus". A memorable evocation of Victorian stoicism—the "stiff upper lip" of self-discipline and fortitude in adversity, which popular culture rendered into a British character trait—"Invictus" remains a cultural touchstone.

== Poem ==
Out of the night that covers me
Black as the pit from pole to pole,
I thank whatever gods may be
For my unconquerable soul.

In the fell clutch of circumstance,
I have not winced nor cried aloud.
Under the bludgeonings of chance
My head is bloody, but unbowed.

Beyond this place of wrath and tears
Looms but the Horror of the shade,
And yet the menace of the years
Finds, and shall find, me unafraid.

It matters not how strait the gate,
How charged with punishments the scroll,
I am the master of my fate:
I am the captain of my soul.

== Analysis ==
With the title being Latin roughly for "unconquered", the poem "Invictus" is a deeply descriptive and motivational work filled with vivid imagery. With four stanzas and sixteen lines, each containing eight syllables, the poem has a rather uncomplicated structure. The poem is most known for its themes of willpower and strength in the face of adversity, much of which is drawn from the horrible fate assigned to many amputees of the day—gangrene and death.

Each stanza takes considerable note of William Ernest Henley's perseverance and fearlessness throughout his early life and over twenty months under Lister's care. In the second stanza, Henley refers to the strength that helped him through a childhood defined by his struggles with tuberculosis when he says "I have not winced nor cried aloud." In the fourth stanza, Henley alludes to the fact that each individual's destiny is under the jurisdiction of themselves, not at the mercy of the obstacles they face, nor other worldly powers.

Those who have taken time to analyze "Invictus" have also taken notice of religious themes, or the lack thereof, that exist in this piece. There is agreement that much of the dark descriptions in the opening lines make reference to Hell. Later, the fourth stanza of the poem alludes to a phrase from Jesus's Sermon on the Mount in the King James Bible, which says, at Matthew 7:14, "Because strait is the gate, and narrow is the way, which leadeth unto life, and few there be that find it."

Despite Henley's evocative tellings of perseverance and determination, worry was on his mind; in a letter to a close companion, William Ernest Henley later confided, "I am afeard my marching days are over" when asked about the condition of his leg.

== Publication history ==
The second edition of Henley's Book of Verses added a dedication "To R. T. H. B."—a reference to Robert Thomas Hamilton Bruce, a successful Scottish flour merchant, baker, and literary patron. The 1900 edition of Henley's Poems, published after Bruce's death, altered the dedication to "I. M. R. T. Hamilton Bruce (1846–1899)," whereby I. M. stands for "in memoriam."

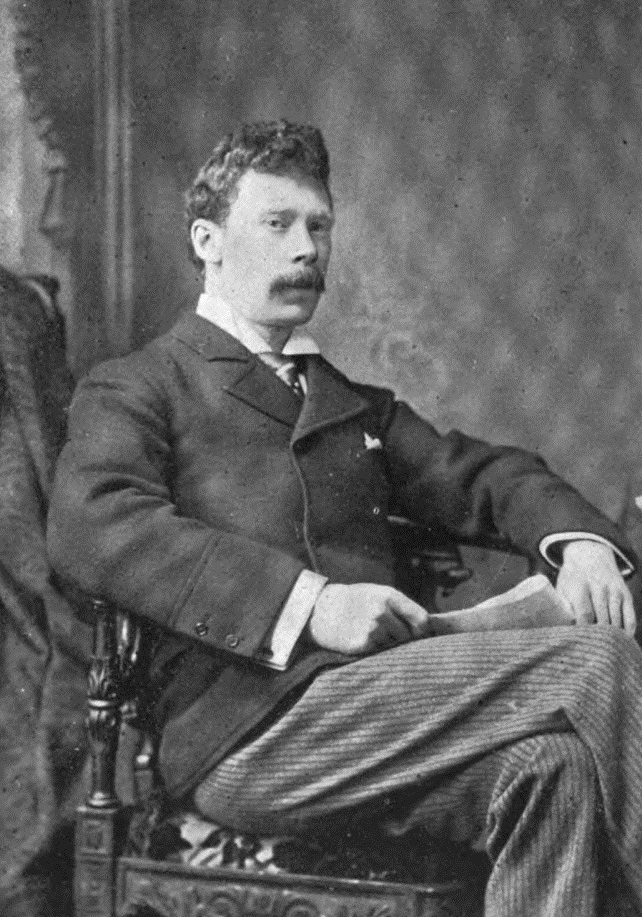
Arthur Quiller-Couch, the editor who came up with the title, "Invictus"

=== Title ===
The poem was published in 1888 in his first volume of poems, Book of Verses, with no title, but would later be reprinted in 19th-century newspapers under various titles, including:

- "Myself"
- "Song of a Strong Soul"
- "My Soul"
- "Clear Grit"
- "Master of His Fate"
- "Captain of My Soul"
- "Urbs Fortitudinis"
- "De Profundis"

The established title "Invictus" was added by editor Arthur Quiller-Couch when the poem was included in the Oxford Book of English Verse (1900).

== Notable uses ==
=== History ===
- Before his death in 1926, labour activist and American presidential candidate Eugene V. Debs wrote down the final lines of the poem on a piece of paper, which was preserved by his family as his last utterance.
- In a speech to the House of Commons on 9 September 1941, Winston Churchill paraphrased the last two lines of the poem, stating "We are still masters of our fate. We still are captains of our souls."
- Nelson Mandela, while incarcerated at Robben Island prison, recited the poem to other prisoners and was empowered by its message of self-mastery.
- Former State Counsellor of Myanmar and Nobel Peace laureate Aung San Suu Kyi stated: "This poem had inspired my father, Aung San, and his contemporaries during the independence struggle, as it also seemed to have inspired freedom fighters in other places at other times."
- The poem was read by U.S. prisoners of war during the Vietnam War. James Stockdale recalls being passed the last stanza, written with rat droppings on toilet paper, from fellow prisoner David Hatcher.
- The poem's last stanza was quoted by U.S. President Barack Obama at the end of his speech at the memorial service of Nelson Mandela in South Africa (10 December 2013), and published on the front cover of the 14 December 2013 issue of The Economist.
- The poem was chosen by Oklahoma City bomber Timothy McVeigh as his final statement before his execution.
- The perpetrator of the Christchurch mosque shootings in New Zealand in 2019 cited "Invictus".
- According to his sister, before becoming a civil rights leader, American Congressman John Lewis used to recite the poem as a teenager and continued to refer to it for inspiration throughout his life.
- Duterte family, one of the most prominent political clans of the Philippines, frequently cited "Invictus" to project resilience and defiance amidst ongoing legal issues:
  - Davao City mayor Sebastian Duterte recited the poem word-for-word during a prayer and protest rally held outside the premises of the International Criminal Court (ICC) in The Hague, Netherlands, in support of his father, former president Rodrigo Duterte, who is currently detained in ICC, on March 2026.
  - Veronica "Kitty" Duterte, Sebastian's younger half-sister and Rodrigo's youngest daughter delivered a message by quoting parts of "Invictus" on behalf of her father outside the International Criminal Court on Wednesday, hours after the tribunal upheld its jurisdiction over his crimes against humanity case, on April 2026.
  - On July 7, 2026 Rodrigo's daughter, Sebastian's older sister and Kitty's older half-sister incumbent vice president Sara Duterte cited the famous parts of the poem during a brief media appearance at the Philippine Senate ahead of her impeachment proceedings.
  - Former president Rodrigo Duterte posted on his Facebook page featuring an image of himself alongside the whole poem with a caption that reads: "Everything I did, I did it for my country." after appearing at the International Criminal Court status conference in his case involving crimes against humanity, on September 16, 2026.

=== Music ===
- The Belgian black / folk metal band Ancient Rites used the poem for their song of the same name on the album Rvbicon.
- The Minnesota-based Indian rock-musician Mychael Gabriel recited this poem as the bridge of his song "Invictus" released in 2020.

=== Film ===
- Nelson Mandela is depicted in Invictus (2009) presenting a copy of the poem to Francois Pienaar, captain of the national South African rugby team, for inspiration during the Rugby World Cup—though at the actual event he gave Pienaar a text of "The Man in the Arena" passage from Theodore Roosevelt's Citizenship in a Republic speech delivered in France in 1910.

=== Sports ===
- The Invictus Games were founded by Prince Harry, the Ministry of Defence, and Sir Keith Mills. Prior to the inaugural games in London in 2014, entertainers including Daniel Craig and Tom Hardy, and athletes including Louis Smith and Iwan Thomas, read the poem in a promotional video.

== See also ==
- If—, Rudyard Kipling
- The Man in the Arena, Theodore Roosevelt
- "Let No Charitable Hope", Elinor Wylie
- Agency (philosophy)
