= Rewards and Fairies =

1910 historical fantasy book by Rudyard Kipling

1913 Macmillan 'Dominions' edition

Rewards and Fairies is a historical fantasy book by Rudyard Kipling published in 1910. The title comes from the poem "Farewell, Rewards and Fairies" by Richard Corbet, which was referred to by the children in the first story of Kipling's 1906 book Puck of Pook's Hill. Rewards and Fairies, a followup to Puck, is set one year later, although it was published four years afterwards. The original satire by Richard Corbet declares "Farewell rewards and Fairies /Good housewives now may say, /For now foul sluts in dairies /Do fare as well as they.

The book consists of a series of short stories set in historical times and a linking contemporary narrative about Dan and Una, two children living in the Weald of Sussex in the area of Kipling's own home, who encounter Puck. He magically conjures up real and fictional individuals from Sussex's past to tell the children some aspect of the history and prehistory of the region, though the episodes are not always historically accurate and some of the stories contain elements of the supernatural as well as history. Another recurring character is Old Hobden, who represents the continuity of the inhabitants of the land. His ancestors sometimes appear in the stories and seem very much like him.

Each story is preceded and followed by a poem, one of which is If—, often described as Britain's favorite poem. Other well known poems included in the book are Cold Iron and The Way through the Woods.

== Stories and poems ==
=== A Charm ===
A poem which gives a charm to see the treasures of familiar places.

=== Introduction ===
A brief summary of Puck of Pook's Hill and the main characters.

=== Cold Iron ===
There is a brief episode in which the children Dan and Una encounter Puck again a year after their previous experience. Then Puck tells the story of a young mortal taken by Fairies whose fate will be determined by the first piece of iron that he encounters.

=== Cold Iron ===
A poem which compares how various metals affect human life but states in a recurring line that 'Iron—Cold Iron—is master of men all!' ending with a reference to the iron nails used to crucify Jesus Christ at Calvary.

=== The Two Cousins ===
A poem which foreshadows the story making references to the devotion of her courtiers to the Queen and the sacrifices they make.

=== Gloriana ===
Dan and Una meet a lady who the reader realises is Queen Elizabeth I. She tells them about a mission to prevent the Spanish settling in Virginia. (The Queen engages the services of two gallant young lordlings who are willing to endure any peril in order to earn her approval. She makes it clear that they must undertake their desperate venture without her official blessing, and indeed that she will officially denounce them before the Spanish King should the need arise. It appears from the narrative as though the mission miscarried, but the Queen is interested to know whether Dan and Una thought it was right to send the young men.)

=== The Looking-Glass ===
This poem shows an ageing Queen Elizabeth being taunted by the spirits of Mary, Queen of Scots and the Earl of Leicester for being too afraid to look in a mirror. But the Queen rallies her courage as daughter of King Henry VIII and looks at her ageing features.

=== A Truthful Song ===
This poem has two verses both deal with the theme how a craftsmen's skills from the past can be applicable in modern life. The first verse has an ancient Egyptian Pyramid builder and the second refers to the story of Noah and shipbuilding.

=== The Wrong Thing ===
Sir Harry Dawe (introduced in 'Hal o' the Draft' in Puck of Pook's Hill) tells Old Hobden and Dan about his design to decorate Henry VII's ship Sovereign and how he gets knighted for advising the King not to use it. (The story also involves Harry's rivalry with the similarly gifted but jealous Benedetto. When Harry is knighted—not for good work, but for giving the King advice that will save him some money—he cannot help laughing since he had always hoped he would be ennobled for his clever craftsmanship. Benedetto, who was on the point of murdering him, sees him overcome with mirth and insists that he should at least have his laugh out before dying, and by the time he has understood the joke himself he is willing to drop their quarrel for good.)

=== King Henry VII and the Shipwrights ===
The King watches how his shipbuilders start to take apart a warship for their own benefit until stopped by one of their fellows who admits to some minor pilfering. He is promoted and the others punished and the king advises him to 'steal in measure'.

=== The Way Through the Woods ===
The poem describes how an old road has been shut and taken back by nature but still occasionally you can hear the ghostly presence of past travellers.

=== Marklake Witches ===
A young girl dying of consumption, describes René Laennec's invention of the stethoscope while a prisoner of war in Sussex. (The narrator, Miss Philadelphia Bucksteed, is clearly innocent of the seriousness of her condition, believing it to be a "silly cough" that will disappear when she goes to London. However, as she describes the reactions of M. Laennec, "Witchmaster" Jerry Gamm, Doctor Break, Sir Arthur Wesley and her own father, it is clear that they all know better. Laennec's presence in Sussex as a prisoner-of-war on parole is entirely Kipling's invention.)

=== Brookland Road ===
A man falls in love with a mysterious silent girl who seems to be supernatural.

=== The Run of the Downs ===
A poem about the South Downs and Sussex naming various landmarks.

=== The Knife and the Naked Chalk ===
A Neolithic shepherd barters one of his eyes with prehistoric metal-working newcomers for metal knives so that his people can fight off the marauding wolves, but in doing so loses his own depth perception, so can no longer hunt or defend himself.

=== Song of the Men's Side ===
This poem reprises the basic plot of the preceding story.

=== Philadelphia ===
The poem refers to the story to follow and states that, while men and places in the story have passed, the landscape and nature persist.

=== Brother Square-Toes ===
Pharaoh Lee, known as Brother Square-Toes, is a Sussex smuggler. In 1793, he ends up in Philadelphia and lives there and among the Seneca people. He attends a meeting of the Seneca and George Washington where Washington states that he will not fight with the French against Britain.

=== If— ===
One of the most famous and popular poems in English, it gives guidance on the ideal behaviour to be considered a man.

=== A St Helena Lullaby ===
A poetic history of Napoleon's career.

=== A Priest in Spite of Himself ===
The continuation of Brother Square-Toes story and how he meets Talleyrand while he was exiled in Philadelphia. Later Talleyrand helped him recover his ship which had been seized as a prize by the French Navy. (Talleyrand is keen to learn what was said in the conversation between Washington and other White leaders, that was witnessed by the Indian chiefs known as Red Jacket and Cornplanter, but Pharaoh will not speak without Red Jacket's leave and he already knows that Red Jacket has held his tongue out of loyalty to Washington. Despite the inconvenience this causes Talleyrand, Pharaoh expects that he will nevertheless wield as much influence in Europe as he wishes, and Talleyrand accepts the compliment once he understands that it is sincerely meant. Talleyrand respects his integrity enough to repay him a favour before Napoleon Bonaparte himself.)

=== 'Poor Honest Men' ===
A lament of smugglers that after all their difficulties they are treated as criminals not honest traders.

=== Eddi's Service ===
Eddi, one of St Wilfrid's priests in Manhood End (Selsey), holds a midnight service and only a donkey and a bullock come, so he preaches to them.

=== The Conversion of St Wilfrid ===
St Wilfrid tells Dan and Una how he converted Æthelwealh, the pagan king of Sussex, by showing tolerance for his old faith in Wotan while they were in danger.

=== Song of the Red War-Boat ===
A Viking ship survives a storm by hard work and faith in Odin and Thor.

=== An Astrologer's Song ===
An astrologer's praise for his art and how the stars rule over humanity. The line "[While] the stars in their courses" was used by James Jeans as the title of his book The stars in their courses, first published 1931 (Cambridge University Press).

=== A Doctor of Medicine ===
Nicholas Culpeper explains how he stopped the plague in a Sussex village by getting the rats killed for astrological reasons. (Although Culpeper was already dead by the time of the Great Plague of London in 1665–1666, lesser outbreaks were common occurrences during his life. Culpeper prescribes the right course of action for all the wrong reasons, but his shade, conjured by Puck, knows only what Culpeper knew in life and naturally believes his reasoning to have been sound.)

=== 'Our Fathers of Old' ===
A poem which lists many medicinal plants and how they were boldly used but laments that in the past medical knowledge was poor and mostly ineffective.

=== The Thousandth Man ===
How one man in a thousand is a friend who will stand by you for the rest of your lives.

=== Simple Simon ===
A Rye shipbuilder tells a story about Francis Drake and the Spanish Armada. It implies that Drake's family came not from Devonshire but from Surrey.

=== Frankie's Trade ===
A sea shanty style poem of how Francis Drake learned his skills as a sailor and to fight against the Spanish.

=== The Ballad of Minepit Shaw ===
Two poachers are saved by falling into a pit but claim they were hidden by a fairy.

=== The Tree of Justice ===
Sir Richard Dalyngridge from Puck of Pook's Hill explains how King Harold survived the Battle of Hastings and ended up a blind beggar.

=== A Carol ===
A lament of the hardships of winter but asking And who shall judge the Lord? for bringing them.
