= Citizenship in a Republic =

1910 speech given by Theodore Roosevelt

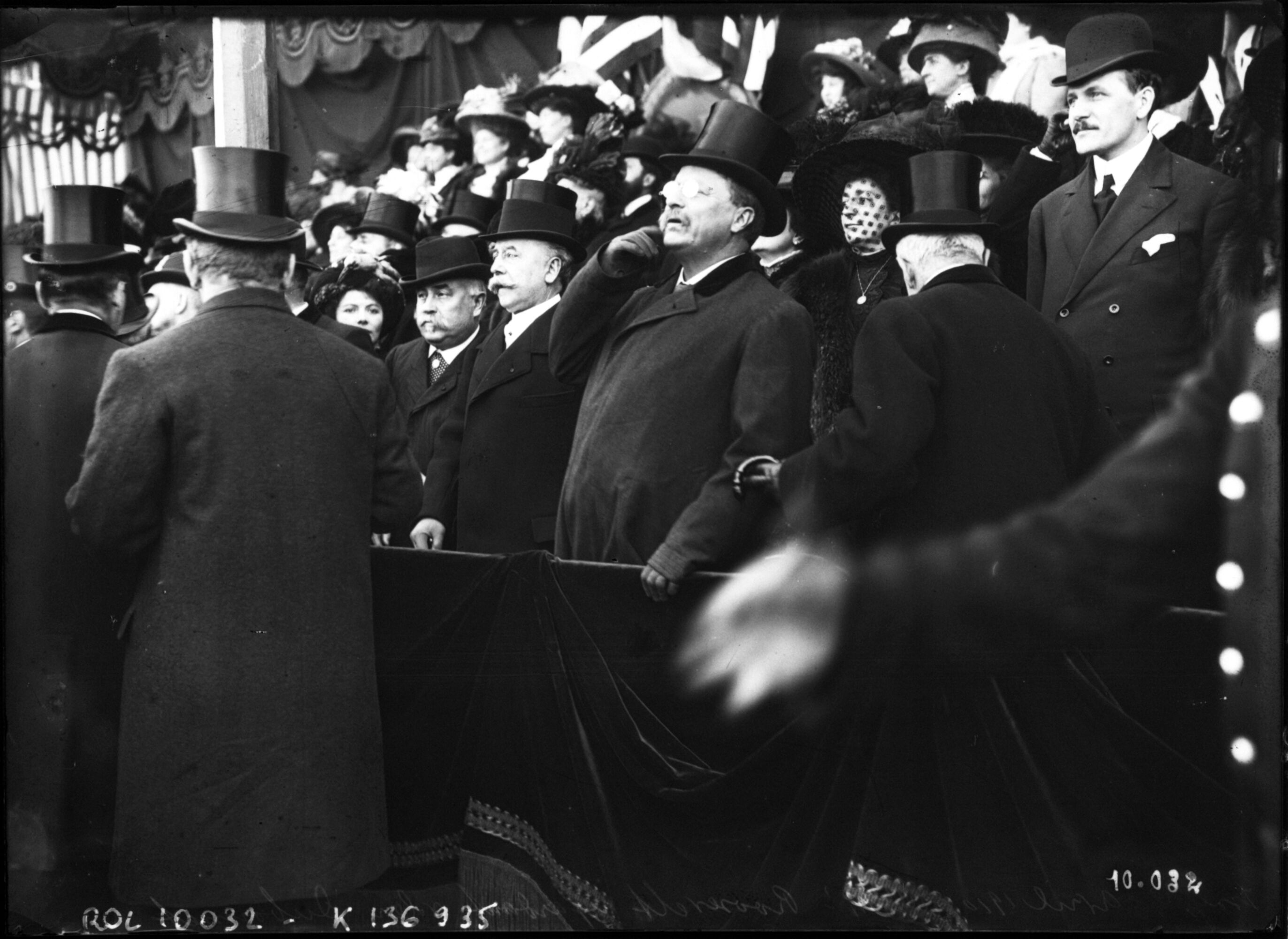
- Theodore Roosevelt watching Dubonnet fly to Issy on Tellier plane in France, three days after his speech
- Date: April 23, 1910; 116 years ago
- Location: Sorbonne
- Type: Speech
- Participants: Theodore Roosevelt
- Website: www.presidency.ucsb.edu/documents/address-the-sorbonne-paris-france-citizenship-republic

Citizenship in a Republic is a speech given by Theodore Roosevelt, the 26th President of the United States, at the Sorbonne in Paris, France, on April 23, 1910.

One notable passage from the speech is referred to as "The Man in the Arena":

It is not the critic who counts; not the man who points out how the strong man stumbles, or where the doer of deeds could have done them better. The credit belongs to the man who is actually in the arena, whose face is marred by dust and sweat and blood; who strives valiantly; who errs, who comes short again and again, because there is no effort without error and shortcoming; but who does actually strive to do the deeds; who knows great enthusiasms, the great devotions; who spends himself in a worthy cause; who at the best knows in the end the triumph of high achievement, and who at the worst, if he fails, at least fails while daring greatly, so that his place shall never be with those cold and timid souls who neither know victory nor defeat.

Someone who is heavily involved in a situation that requires courage, skill, or tenacity, as opposed to someone sitting on the sidelines and watching, is often referred to as "the man in the arena."

== In popular culture ==
The "Man in the Arena" passage was quoted by another U.S. president, Richard Nixon, both in his victory speech on November 6, 1968, and in his resignation address to the nation on August 8, 1974:

Sometimes I have succeeded and sometimes I have failed, but always I have taken heart from what Theodore Roosevelt once said about the man in the arena, "whose face is marred by dust and sweat and blood [...]"

Nelson Mandela gave a copy of this speech to François Pienaar, captain of the South African rugby team, before the start of the 1995 Rugby World Cup, in which the South African side eventually defeated the heavily favoured All Blacks of New Zealand. In the film based on those events, the poem "Invictus" is used instead.

Mark DeRosa, an American professional baseball utility player then with the Washington Nationals, read the passage to teammates prior to the Nationals' pivotal Game Four versus the St. Louis Cardinals in the 2012 National League Division Series which was won on a walk-off home run by the Nationals' Jayson Werth. Since his days at the University of Pennsylvania, DeRosa would turn to those words before important games.

American scholar Brené Brown quotes the excerpt in the Netflix special The Call to Courage; she also used a somewhat abbreviated version of the quote in her March 2012 TED talk "Listening to Shame," and subsequently as the inspiration for the title of her book, Daring Greatly (2012).

When then Ferrari Formula One driver Jean Alesi was about to start the last lap of the 1995 Canadian Grand Prix (which would become his only Grand Prix win), then ESPN commentator Bob Varsha used parts of Roosevelt´s speech, saying that Alesi looked a while like being the man Roosevelt had talked about.

The "Man in the Arena" passage was used in a 2015 ad for Cadillac, ending with "dare greatly".

At the 2016 Democratic National Convention President Barack Obama cited the speech in his endorsement speech of Hillary Clinton.

Lindsey Stirling's 2016 album release Brave Enough features a song titled "The Arena". The inspiration for this song comes from this speech. The music video for the track also starts out with a quotation from this speech.

LeBron James has #ManInTheArena written on his shoes.

During the United States Naval Academy's Plebe Summer, incoming freshmen are encouraged to memorize "The Man in the Arena".

Tom Brady named his ESPN+ docuseries “Man in the Arena,” drawing directly from the famous passage in Theodore Roosevelt’s “Citizenship in a Republic”. The series has 10 episodes with each focused on one of Tom Brady’s 10 Super Bowl game appearances.

“Man in the Arena” the lead single off The Script’s eighth album The User’s Guide to the Galaxy, is based on Citizenship in the Republic and uses some lines from the speech verbatim

== See also ==
- If—
- The Strenuous Life
- Muscular Christianity
