= St Bartholomew's Church, Burwash =

Parish church in the village of Burwash, East Sussex, England

Coordinates: 50.99769°N 0.38874°E

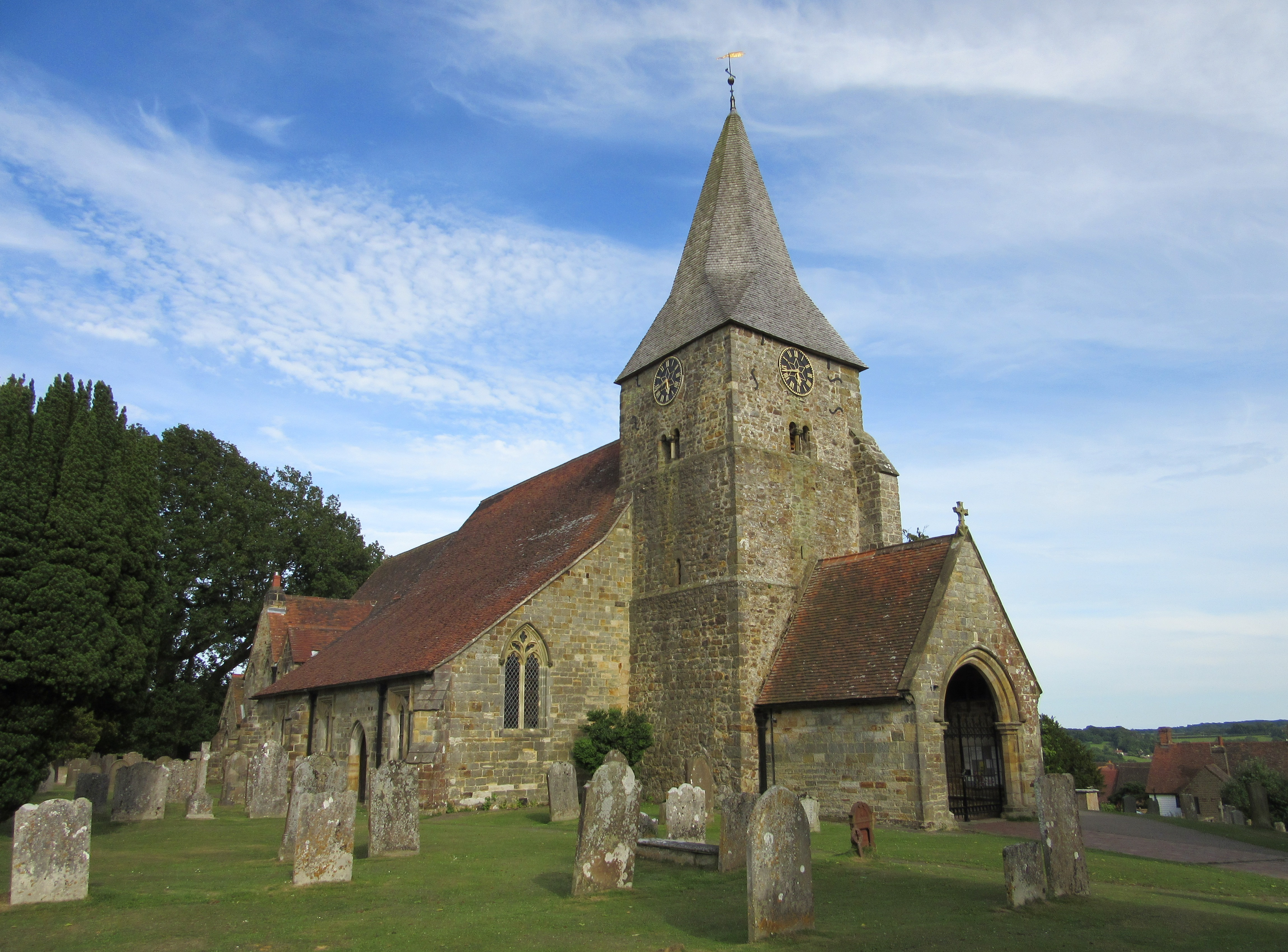

- Location within East Sussex
- Location: Burwash, East Sussex
- Country: England
- Denomination: Anglican
- Website: sussexparishchurches.org/church/burwash-st-bartholomew

History
- Status: Parish church

Architecture
- Functional status: Active
- Heritage designation: Grade II*
- Designated: 3 August 1961
- Completed: Originally 1090, rebuilt since

Administration
- Province: Canterbury
- Diocese: Chichester
- Archdeaconry: Hastings
- Deanery: Dallington
- Parish: Burwash

St Bartholomew's Church is a parish church in the village of Burwash, East Sussex, England. It is a Grade II* listed building.

== Building ==
St Bartholomew's Church is located next to the A265 road.

Only the thick-walled tower survives from the original Norman church (built in 1090) with evidence of its origin being discernible by the great width of the mortar in which the stones are bedded and which can be seen from the outside.

The church was partially rebuilt and extensively restored in 1856; the chancel was completely renewed, although its 13th-century arch survives. This work also included the lowering of the floor and this in turn necessitated the removal of a considerable depth of earth from the surrounding churchyard. Some of the flooring of the church was again renewed owing to the considerable rotting of the old planks, in the years 1989 to 1990.

In the south aisle, an early-16th century cast-iron memorial slab is the oldest in England, as Burwash was a centre of the Wealden iron industry.

== History ==
The church was originally built in the Norman Era, in 1090, however only the tower survives of this original church.

== See also ==
- List of places of worship in Rother
- Burwash

== Sources ==
- Antram, Nicholas; Pevsner, Nikolaus (2013). Sussex: East with Brighton and Hove. The Buildings of England. London: Yale University Press. ISBN 978-0-300-18473-0.
- Barkshire, John (2000). Burwash: Domesday to Millennium. Burwash: John Barkshire. ISBN 0-9538259-0-6.
- Coppin, Paul (2001). 101 Medieval Churches of East Sussex. Seaford: S.B. Publications. ISBN 1-85770-238-7.
- Syms, James Antony (1994). East Sussex Country Churches. Seaford: S.B. Publications. ISBN 1-85770-056-2.
- Whiteman, Ken; Whiteman, Joyce (1998). Ancient Churches of Sussex. Seaford: S.B. Publications. ISBN 1-85770-154-2.
- Willatts, Rosalind (1987). 'Iron graveslabs: a sideline of the early iron industry' in Sussex Archaaeological Collections, vol. 125, pp. 99-113. Lewes: Sussex Archaeological Society.
