= Iron in folklore =

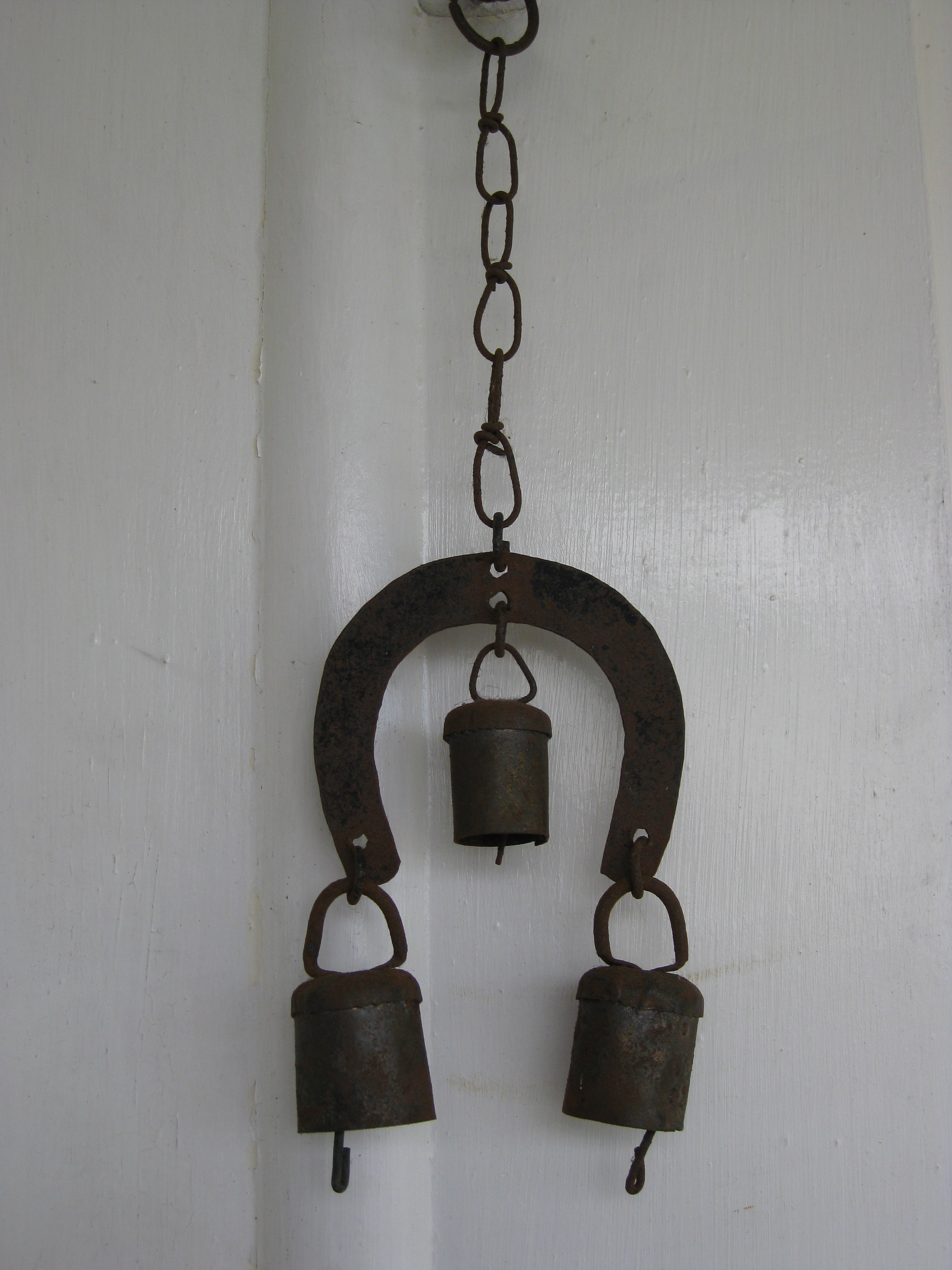
A horseshoe wind chime, used as a good luck charm

Iron has a long and varied tradition in the mythology and folklore of the world.

While iron is now the name of a chemical element, the traditional meaning of the word "iron" is what is now called wrought iron. In East Asia, cast iron was also common after 500 BC, and was called "cooked iron", with wrought iron being called "raw iron" (in Europe, cast iron remained very rare until it was used for cannonballs in the 14th century). At the end of the Bronze Age and beginning of the Iron Age, tools (including weapons) of iron replaced those of bronze, and iron-using cultures replaced bronze-using cultures. Many early legends spring from this transition, such as Homeric epic and the Vedas, as well as major cultural shifts in Africa. Iron mixed with larger amounts of carbon has very different working properties and structural properties, and is called steel. Steel was rare; making it was difficult and somewhat unpredictable, and steelworkers were often associated with supernatural skill, until the Industrial Revolution. Now, steel is cheaper to make, and most of what is now sold as "wrought iron" is in fact mild steel. See ferrous metallurgy for more historical detail.

== In Europe ==
=== Cold iron ===
"Cold iron" is historically believed to repel, contain, or harm ghosts, fairies, witches, and other malevolent supernatural creatures. This belief continued into later superstitions in a number of forms:

- Nailing an iron horseshoe to a door was said to repel evil spirits or, later, to bring good luck.
- Surrounding a cemetery with an iron fence was thought to contain the souls of the dead.
- Burying an iron knife under the entrance to one's home was alleged to keep witches from entering.

"Cold iron" is a substitute name used for various animals and incidents considered unlucky by Irish fishermen. A similar phenomenon has been found with Scottish fishermen.

=== Horseshoes ===
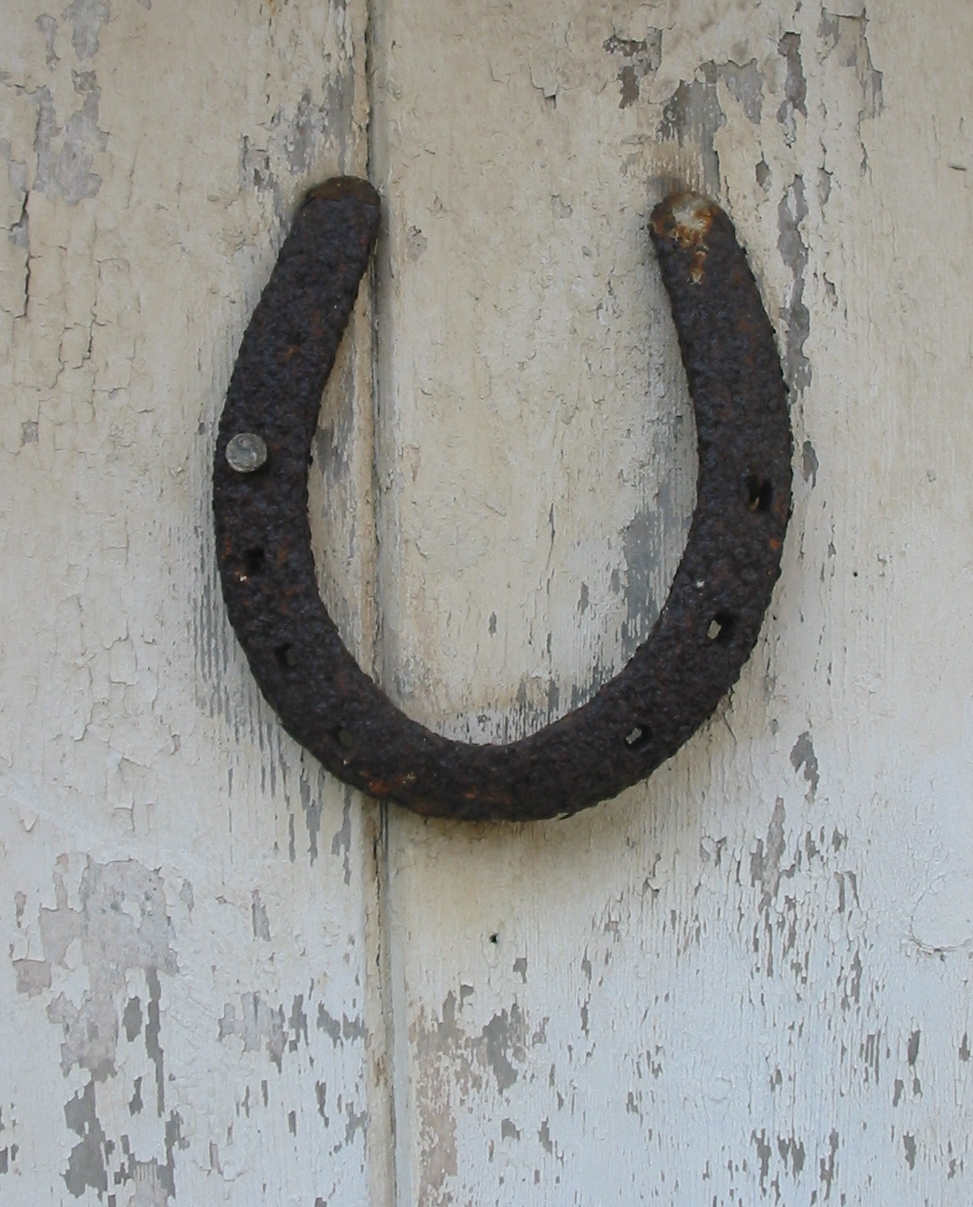
A horseshoe on a door is regarded as a protective talisman in some cultures.

Horseshoes are considered a good luck charm in many cultures, including those of England, Denmark, Lithuania, and Estonia, and its shape, fabrication, placement and manner of sourcing are all important. A common belief is that if a horseshoe is hung on a door with the two ends pointing up then good luck will occur. However, if the two ends point downwards then bad luck will occur. Traditions do differ on this point, however. In some cultures, the horseshoe is hung points down (so the luck pours onto a person standing under it); in others, it is hung points up (so the luck does not fall out); in others it does not matter so long as the horseshoe has been used (not new), was found (not purchased), and can be touched. In all traditions, luck is contained in the shoe and can pour out through the ends.

In some traditions, any good or bad luck achieved will only occur to the owner of the horseshoe, not the person who hangs it up. Therefore, if the horseshoe was stolen, borrowed or even just found then the owner, not the person who found or stole the horseshoe, will get any good or bad luck. Other traditions require that the horseshoe be found to be effective.

Illustration by George Cruikshank for The True Legend of St. Dunstan and the Devil

One reputed origin of the tradition of lucky horseshoes is the story of Saint Dunstan and the Devil. Dunstan, who would become the Archbishop of Canterbury in AD 959, was a blacksmith by trade. The story relates that he once nailed a horseshoe to the Devil's hoof when he was asked to reshoe the Devil's horse. This caused the Devil great pain, and Dunstan only agreed to remove the shoe and release the Devil after the Devil promised never to enter a place where a horseshoe is hung over the door.

Another possible reason for the placing of horseshoes above doorways is to ward off faeries, the supposition being that supernatural beings are repelled by iron and as horseshoes were an easily available source of iron, they could be nailed above a door to prevent such beings entering a house.

== Meteoric iron in Tibet ==
Thogcha (Tibetan: ཐོག་ལྕགས, Wylie: thog lcags) means 'sky-iron' in Tibetan. Meteoric iron was highly prized throughout the Himalayas, where it was included in sophisticated polymetallic alloys for ritual implements such as the singing bowl (Jansen, 1992) and phurba (Müller-Ebeling, et al., 2002).

Beer (1999: p. 234) states that:

Meteoric iron or "sky-iron" (Tib. gnam lcags) is the supreme substance for forging the physical representation of the vajra or other iron weapons, since it has already been tempered by the celestial gods in its passage across the heavens. The indivisibility of form and emptiness is a perfect metaphor for the image of a meteorite or "stone fallen from the sky", manifesting out of the voidness of space as a shooting star or fireball, and depositing a chunk of fused "sky iron" on the earth below. Many vajras held by deities as weapons are described as being forged from meteorite iron, and Tibet, with its high altitude, thin atmosphere and desolate landscape, received an abundance of meteorite fragments. Tibetan vajras were often cast from meteorite iron, and as an act of sympathetic magic a piece of the meteoric iron was often returned to its original site.

== In Judaism ==
In Judges 1:19, although God was with Judah (see Verse 2), he (Judah) was unable to lead the nation to victory against the Valleymen due to them having chariots of iron. "And the LORD was with Judah; and he drave out the inhabitants of the mountain; but could not drive out the inhabitants of the valley, because they had chariots of iron."

== In fiction ==
Cold iron is a poetic term for iron. Francis Grose's 1811 Dictionary of the Vulgar Tongue defines cold iron as "A sword, or any other weapon for cutting or stabbing." This usage often appears as "cold steel" in modern parlance.

Rudyard Kipling's poem "Cold Iron", found in his 1910 collection of stories Rewards and Fairies, used the term poetically to mean "weapon".

In his novel Redgauntlet, the Scottish author Sir Walter Scott wrote, "Your wife's a witch, man; you should nail a horse-shoe on your chamber-door."

In modern fantasy, cold iron may refer to a special type of metal, such as meteoric iron or unworked metal. Weapons and implements made from cold iron are often granted special efficacy against creatures such as fairies and spirits.

In the Disney film Maleficent, the title character reveals early on that iron is lethal to fairies, and that the metal burns them on contact.

In the Pokémon games, Pokémon categorized as Fairy-types are weak against moves that are categorized as Steel-type. Fairy-type moves are also less effective than other types of moves against Pokémon of the Steel-type.

In the Lords and Ladies novel of Terry Pratchett's Discworld series, the Elves are a fey and maleficent race, strongly sensitive to what a modern reader will recognize to be magnetic fields. They are powerfully averse to iron for this reason.

In Quatermass and the Pit, an iron crane is used to disperse the energy of a Martian that emerges from archeological excavations. The use of "iron and water against the devil" is cited by one of the characters who suggests and applies the theory.

In Trollhunters: Tales of Arcadia, as well as the wider Tales of Arcadia canon, a pure iron horseshoe, referred to as a "gaggletack", can be used to force changelings to take the form of either a troll or a human, depending on whichever they were not currently voluntarily taking, upon direct contact with a gaggletack. Gaggletacks are used within the series to reveal trolls and humans to be changelings.

In Changeling: The Dreaming, Changelings as well as True Fae are weak to cold iron, in the mechanics of the game, cold iron does "aggravated" damage to Changelings and True Fae, meaning it cannot be healed with any supernatural means or accelerated healing powers. A player playing a Changeling or True Fae must weigh the risks of fighting people with Cold Iron, as healing from potential wounds could take as long, if not longer, than equivalent wounds done to a human.

== See also ==
- Silver § Symbolic role
- Silver bullet
