= If— =

Poem by Rudyard Kipling

- by Rudyard Kipling
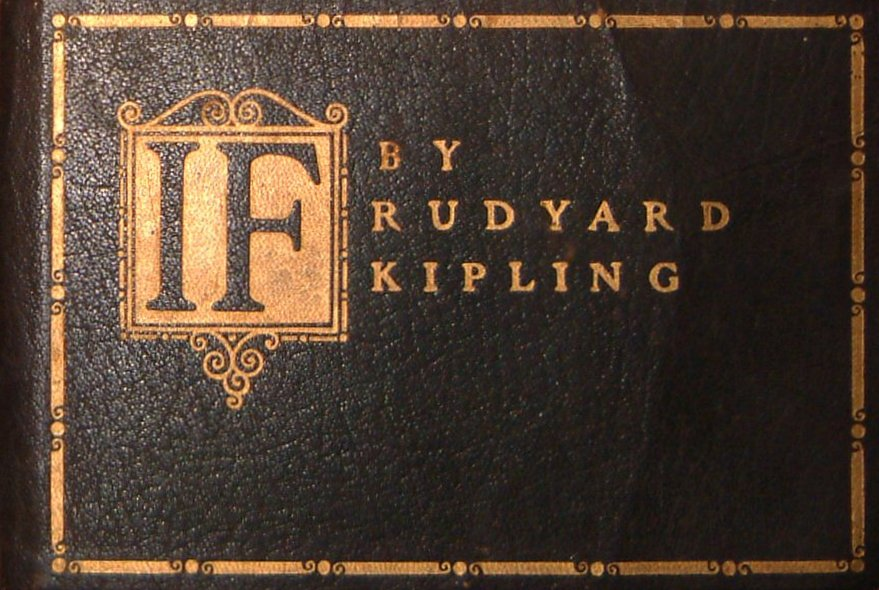
- A Doubleday, Page & Co. edition from 1910
- First published in: Rewards and Fairies
- Publisher: Doubleday, Page & Company
- Publication date: 1910 (116 years ago)

"If—" is a poem by the English poet Rudyard Kipling (1865–1936), written as a tribute to Leander Starr Jameson. It is a literary example of Victorian-era values. The poem, first published in Rewards and Fairies (1910) following the story "Brother Square-Toes", is written in the form of paternal advice to the poet's son, John.

== Publication ==
"If—" first appeared in the "Brother Square Toes" chapter of the book Rewards and Fairies, a collection of Kipling's poetry and short-story fiction published in 1910. In his posthumously published autobiography, Something of Myself (1937), Kipling said that, in writing the poem, he was inspired by the character of Leander Starr Jameson, leader of the failed Jameson Raid against the South African Republic to overthrow the Boer government of Paul Kruger. The failure of that mercenary coup d'état aggravated the political tensions between the United Kingdom and the Boers, which led to the Second Boer War (1899–1902).

== Text ==
If you can keep your head when all about you
Are losing theirs and blaming it on you;
If you can trust yourself when all men doubt you,
But make allowance for their doubting too:
If you can wait and not be tired by waiting,
Or being lied about, don't deal in lies,
Or being hated don't give way to hating,
And yet don't look too good, nor talk too wise;

If you can dream—and not make dreams your master;
If you can think—and not make thoughts your aim,
If you can meet with Triumph and Disaster
And treat those two impostors just the same:
If you can bear to hear the truth you've spoken
Twisted by knaves to make a trap for fools,
Or watch the things you gave your life to, broken,
And stoop and build 'em up with worn-out tools;

If you can make one heap of all your winnings
And risk it on one turn of pitch-and-toss,
And lose, and start again at your beginnings
And never breathe a word about your loss:
If you can force your heart and nerve and sinew
To serve your turn long after they are gone,
And so hold on when there is nothing in you
Except the Will which says to them: 'Hold on!'

If you can talk with crowds and keep your virtue,
Or walk with Kings—nor lose the common touch,
If neither foes nor loving friends can hurt you,
If all men count with you, but none too much:
If you can fill the unforgiving minute
With sixty seconds' worth of distance run,
Yours is the Earth and everything that's in it,
And—which is more—you'll be a Man, my son!

== Reception ==
As an evocation of Victorian-era stoicism, the "stiff upper lip" self-discipline that popular culture rendered into a British national virtue and character trait, "If—" remains a cultural touchstone. The British cultural-artifact status of the poem is evidenced by the parodies of the poem, and by its popularity among Britons.

Kipling himself took wry note of the poem's ubiquity, noting in the last year of his life:

Once started, the mechanisation of the age made [the verses] snowball themselves in a way that startled me. Schools, and places where they teach, took them for the suffering Young—which did me no good with the Young when I met them later. ('Why did you write that stuff? I’ve had to write it out twice as an impot.') They were printed as cards to hang up in offices and bedrooms; illuminated text-wise and anthologised to weariness. Twenty-seven of the Nations of the Earth translated them into their seven-and-twenty tongues, and printed them on every sort of fabric.

In 1931, Elizabeth Lincoln Otis wrote "An 'If' for Girls" in response to Kipling's poem. Otis's poem was published in the anthology Father: An Anthology of Verse (1931).

T. S. Eliot included the poem in his 1941 collection A Choice of Kipling's Verse.

In India, a framed copy of the poem was affixed to the wall before the study desk in the cabins of the officer cadets at the National Defence Academy at Pune and the Indian Naval Academy at Ezhimala. In Britain, the first verse is set, in granite setts, into the pavement of the promenade in Westward Ho! in Devon. The third and fourth lines of the second stanza of the poem: "If you can meet with Triumph and Disaster / and treat those two impostors just the same" are written on the wall of the players' entrance to the Centre Court at the All England Lawn Tennis and Croquet Club, where the Wimbledon Championships are held. These same lines appear at the West Side Tennis Club in Forest Hills, New York City, where the US Open was played until 1977.

The Indian writer Khushwant Singh considered the poem "the essence of the message of The Gita in English."

Charles McGrath, a former deputy editor of The New Yorker and a former editor of the New York Times Book Review, wrote that when he was in school, "they had to recite Kipling's 'If—' every day, right after the Pledge of Allegiance."

Pablo Neruda—like Kipling, a Nobel laureate—found a framed ornamental copy of the poem near the Duke of Alba's bedside in the Palacio de Liria. However, his view was not favourable, and he referred to it as "that pedestrian and sanctimonious poetry, precursor of the Reader's Digest, whose intellectual level seems to me no higher than that of the Duke of Alba's boots."

In the BBC's 1996 nationwide poll, "If—" was voted the UK's favourite poem, gaining twice as many votes as the runner-up.

The boxer Muhammad Ali was known to carry the poem in his wallet throughout his life as a guiding principle.

In 2006, the French philosopher Olivier Rey saw "If—" as an example of paternal tyranny, in which the father imposes a list of impossible conditions on his son.

== See also ==
- "Invictus" by William Ernest Henley
- "The Man in the Arena" by Theodore Roosevelt
- "Desiderata" by Max Ehrmann
- "The Gods of the Copybook Headings" by Rudyard Kipling
- "Vitaï Lampada" by Henry Newbolt
- Agency (philosophy)
