= Cold Iron (video game) =

2018 video game

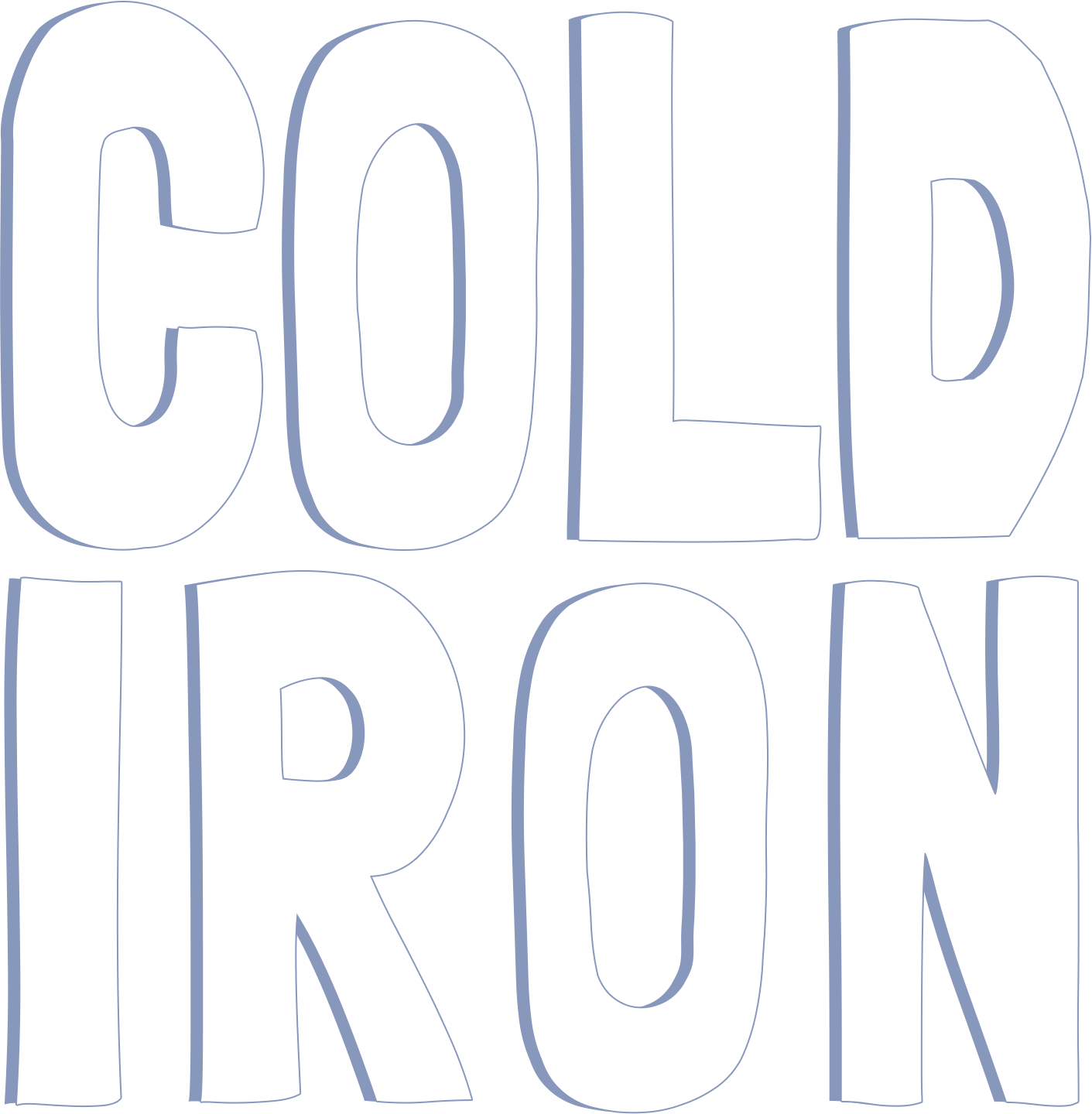
- Developers: Catch & Release
- Publishers: Catch & Release
- Engine: Unity
- Platforms: HTC Vive, PlayStation 4, Oculus Rift
- Release: Microsoft Windows: WW: January 30, 2018; PlayStation 4: WW: January 30, 2018
- Genre: Shooter
- Mode: Single-player

Cold Iron is a 2018 virtual reality first-person shooter video game developed and published by Catch & Release for HTC Vive, PlayStation VR, and Oculus Rift. The game is presented in a first-person perspective, with a primary focus on fast draw and puzzle solving gameplay. Cold Iron was released on January 30, 2018.

== Plot ==
After mysterious outlaws ride into town and gun down your father, you are tasked with seeking revenge with the help of your father's signature weapon, the titular Cold Iron. Along the journey it is revealed that Cold Iron is a unique weapon with magical properties. The player is subsequently entrusted with destroying the weapon and ridding the world of its evil power while overcoming opponents from different time periods and dimensions who seek to stop you in your quest.

== Gameplay ==
Cold Iron is marketed under the term "puzzle-shooter", combining elements of first-person shooter and puzzle games. After obtaining Cold Iron, players progress through a series of increasingly complex duels. These interactions range from basic western-style duels that emphasize speed, to more puzzle focused battles, such as finding differences between multiple enemies and identifying the correct one.

== Reception ==
Reception

Aggregate score
Aggregator	Score
Metacritic	71/100

Review scores
Publication	Score
GameCritics	9.0/10
Gaming Nexus	8.0/10
PlayStation LifeStyle	8.0/10
4Players.de	7.8/10
Impulsegamer	3.6/5

Cold Iron has received "mixed or average" reviews according to review aggregator website Metacritic. Both GameCritics and PlayStation LifeStyle praised the game's rewarding puzzle elements and split-second shooting. Some reviewers found that the game was overly punishing in its difficulty, though GamingNexus noted that while "some might consider it too difficult, the game never feels unfair."
