= Cold Iron (poem) =

Poem by Rudyard Kipling

"Cold Iron" is a poem written by Rudyard Kipling published as the introduction to Rewards and Fairies in 1910. Not to be confused with Kipling's 1909 Cold Iron (The Tale) published in the same book.

In 1983, Leslie Fish set the poem to music and recorded it as the title track on her fifth cassette-tape album. In 1996, the song was nominated for a Pegasus Award for "Best Spiritual Song" by a ballot of science fiction and fantasy fans, conducted by the committee of the annual Ohio Valley Filk Fest (OVFF), a filk music convention.

== Summary ==
"Cold Iron" begins with Baron realizing that war (cold iron) is the gift or metal of man. The second stanza implies that the Baron believes force is how one gets what they want. The third stanza implies the foolishness of the Baron. The Baron rebels against the King, but is captured. However, the King shows him mercy. In stanza seven, the reader sees that the King is actually Christ. The eighth stanza talks about Christianity and the forgiveness Christ gives to His followers.

== Text ==
Gold is for the mistress – silver for the maid" –
Copper for the craftsman cunning at his trade!"
"Good!" said the Baron, sitting in his hall,
But Iron – Cold Iron – is master of them all."

So he made rebellion 'gainst the King his liege,
Camped before his citadel and summoned it to siege.
"Nay!" said the cannoneer on the castle wall,
"But Iron – Cold Iron – shall be master of you all!"

Woe for the Baron and his knights so strong,
When the cruel cannon-balls laid 'em all along;
He was taken prisoner, he was cast in thrall,
And Iron – Cold Iron – was master of it all.

Yet his King spake kindly (ah, how kind a Lord!)
"What if I release thee now and give thee back thy sword?"
"Nay!" said the Baron," mock not at my fall,
For Iron – Cold Iron – is master of men all."

"Tears are for the craven, prayers are for the clown
Halters for the silly neck that cannot keep a crown."
"As my loss is grievous, So my hope is small,
For Iron – Cold Iron – must be master of men all!"

Yet his King made answer (few such Kings there be!)"
Here is Bread and here is Wine – sit and sup with me.
Eat and drink in Mary's Name, the whiles I do recall
How Iron – Cold Iron – can be master of men all."

He took the Wine and blessed it. He blessed and brake the Bread
With His own Hands He served Them, and presently He said:
"See! These Hands they pierced with nails, outside My city wall,
Show Iron – Cold Iron – to be master of men all."

"Wounds are for the desperate, blows are for the strong.
Balm and oil for weary hearts all cut and bruised with wrong.
I forgive thy treason – I redeem thy fall
For Iron Cold Iron – must be master of men all!"

'Crowns are for the valiant – sceptres for the bold!
Thrones and Powers for mighty men who dare to take and hold!'
"Nay!" said the Baron, kneeling in his hall,
"But Iron – Cold Iron – is master of men all!
Iron out of Calvary is master of men all!"

== Interpretation ==
Peter Bellamy sang it on his first album of songs set to Kipling's poems: Oak, Ash and Thorn. He stated that the text of the song isn't derived from the tale of Cold Iron but they share a common theme of the iron's influence over men and the People of the Hills.

William H. Stoddard observed that "Cold Iron" means ordinary iron that the Roman Legion used to crucify criminals, he also commented how the iron was interpreted differently as a magical substance.

== Music ==
The poem was set to music by Leslie Fish, who besides her political activism, is well known for setting many poems of Kipling to music.
