= Dallington Forest =

Forest in Northamptonshire, England

Coordinates: 50.961°N 0.351°E

- Site of Special Scientific Interest
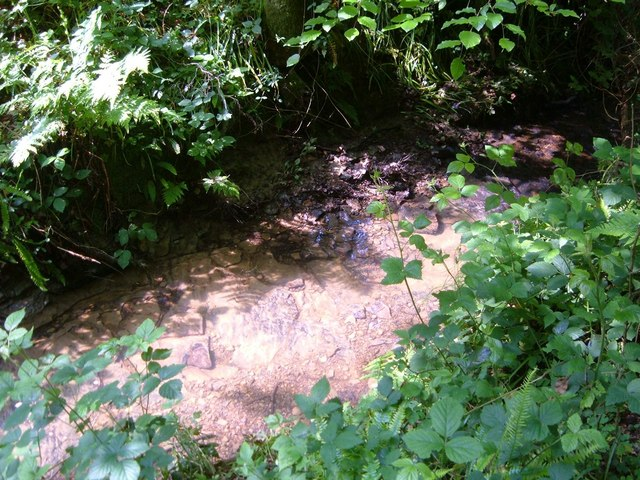
- Location of Dallington Forest.
- Area of search: East Sussex
- Grid reference: TQ 652 206
- Interest: Biological
- Area: 16.1 hectares (40 acres)
- Notification date: 1985
- Location map: Magic Map

Dallington Forest is a 16.1-hectare (40-acre) biological Site of Special Scientific Interest (SSSI) east of Heathfield in East Sussex. The SSSI is part of the larger Dallington Forest.

The Willingford Stream has cut through forest, creating a steep sided valley with a warm and moist microclimate and the woodland in the valley is the main feature of the site. In the north beech and oak are dominant, whereas in the south there is very little beech and the main trees are oak, birch and hazel. In the bottom of the valley there are stands of alder.
