= Bateman's =

Home of Rudyard Kipling in Burwash, East Sussex, England

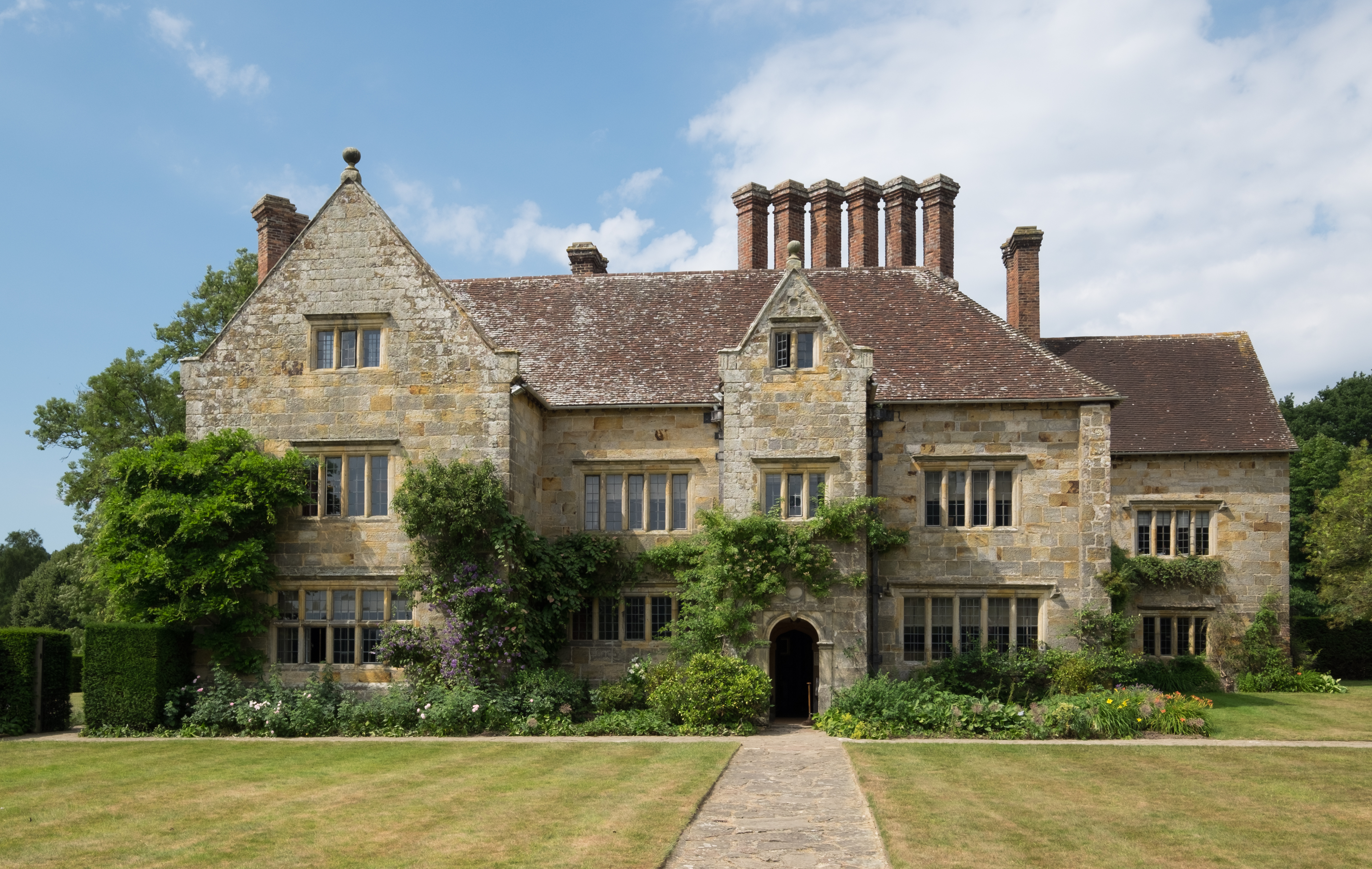
- "A good and peaceable place" - Kipling on his beloved Sussex home

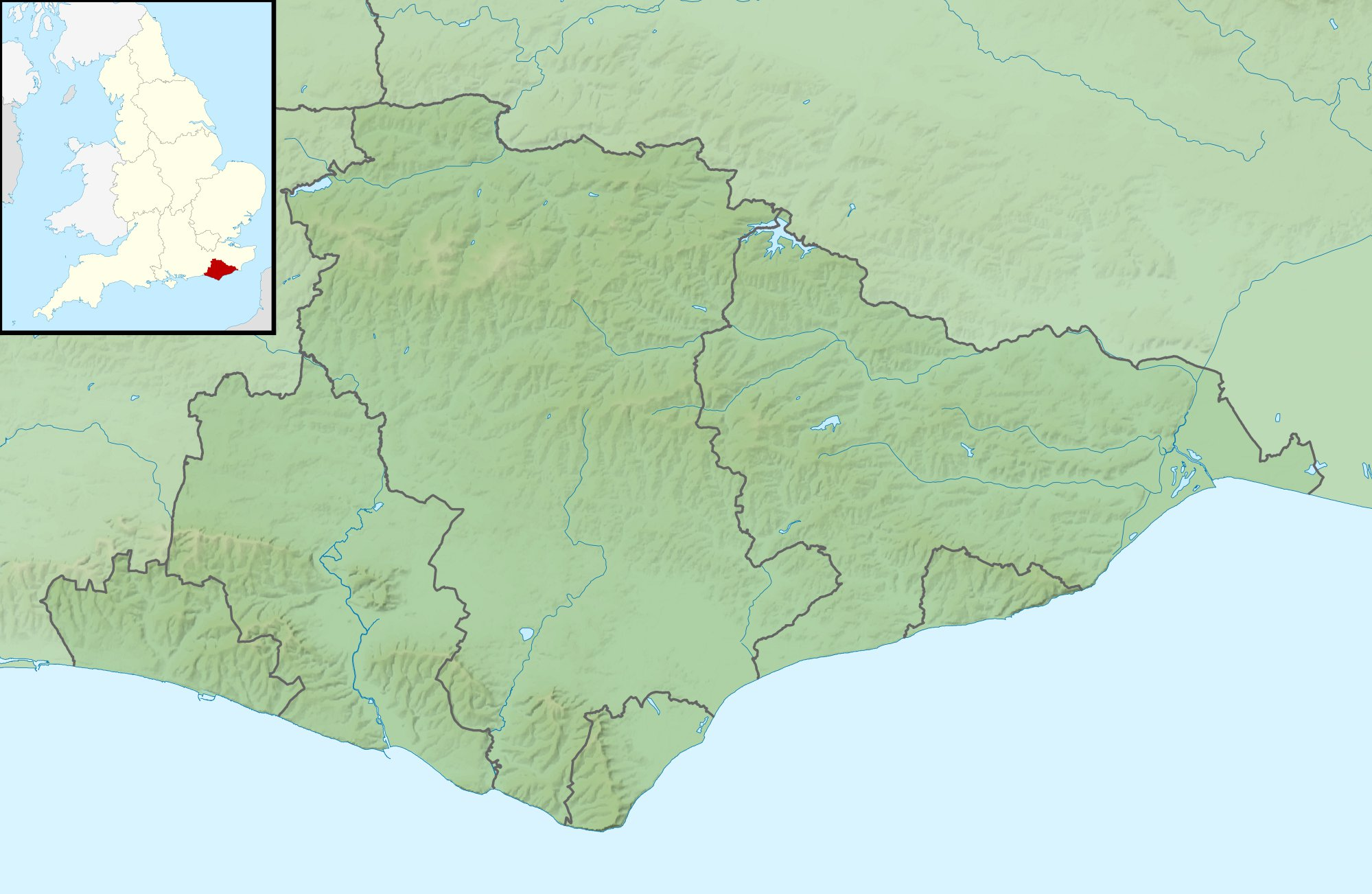
- Location within East Sussex
- 50.9893°N 0.3793°E
- Type: House
- Location: Burwash, East Sussex

History
- Built: 1634

Site notes
- Architectural style: Jacobean
- Governing body: National Trust

Listed Building – Grade I
- Official name: Bateman's
- Designated: 3 August 1961
- Reference no.: 1044063

Bateman's is a 17th-century house located in Burwash, East Sussex, England. It was the home of Rudyard Kipling from 1902 until his death in 1936. The house was built in 1634. Kipling's widow Caroline bequeathed the house to the National Trust on her death in 1939. The house is a Grade I listed building.

== History ==
Bateman's is a Jacobean Wealden mansion constructed in 1634. There is debate as to the original builder. Historic England follows the tradition favoured by Kipling of ascribing the construction to a Sussex ironmaster, John Britten. The historian Adam Nicolson reports the tradition in the National Trust's guidebook, but notes that Britten was a dealer in iron, rather than a manufacturer. Pevsner attributes the construction to a lawyer, William Langham.

By the early twentieth century, the house had descended to the status of a farmhouse, and was in a poor state of repair. The Kiplings first saw it in 1900, on returning to England from America, following the death of their daughter Josephine in 1899 and a disastrous falling-out between them and Carrie Kipling's brother, Beatty Balestier. Enchanted by the house, they were too slow in making an offer and it was let for two years. In 1902, they were able to purchase it, with 33 acres of land, from a wealthy stockbroker, Alexander Carron Scrimgeour.

In 1900, Kipling was the most famous author in England, and was earning £5,000 per year; the cost of Bateman's, £9,300, was thus entirely affordable. Kipling wrote some of his finest works at the house including: "If—", "The Glory of the Garden", and Puck of Pook's Hill, named after the hill visible from the house. The house's setting and the wider local area features in many of his stories. Kipling's poem "The Land" is inspired by the Bateman's estate.

Kipling's only son, John, was killed at the Battle of Loos on 29 September 1915. Kipling died on 18 January 1936, of peritonitis. Carrie died three years later, in 1939. Under the terms of her will the house passed to the National Trust.

== Architecture and description ==
The house is built of sandstone to a double-pile plan, and is of two storeys with gables above. The eastern entrance, front may once have been symmetrical with a northern wing matching the southern one. Historic England's listing states that the wing was constructed but later torn down, while Pevsner suggests that it may never have been built. The windows are mullioned and the roof has an "impressive row of six diamond-shaped red brick chimney stacks".

The interior is retained as it was in the time of the Kiplings. The study is almost as Kipling left it, although without the "pungent aroma" of his forty-a-day Turkish cigarette habit. The house contains a significant collection relating to Kipling, amounting to nearly 5,000 individual pieces, including his Nobel Prize, his Rolls-Royce Phantom I, many oriental items he purchased while living in India or touring in the East and paintings he collected by Edward Poynter, Edward Burne-Jones and James Whistler.

The garden was created by Kipling from 1907, using the prize money from his award of the Nobel Prize in Literature. The house is a Grade I listed building, the highest grade reserved for buildings of "exceptional interest".

== Park Mill ==
Park Mill

There is a water mill on the estate, powered by water from the River Dudwell. The earliest reference to a mill relates to its construction between 1246 and 1248, and first mentioned with the name 'Park' in 1618. The present mill was built between 1751 and 1753, and extended in the 1830s. It became part of the Bateman's estate in the late 19th century. By Kipling's time, the mill was no longer in operation and he installed an electric turbine in it to provide power for the house. The mill was restored by the Trust in 1975, and again between 2017 and 2020. The mill is itself Grade II listed.

== Sources ==
- Antram, Nicholas; Pevsner, Nikolaus (2013). Sussex: East. The Buildings of England. New Haven, US & London, UK: Yale University Press. ISBN 9-780300-18473-0. OCLC 826658807.
- Aslet, Clive (2005). Landmarks of Britain. London: Hodder & Stoughton. ISBN 978-0-340-73510-7.
- Garnett, Oliver (2015). Rudyard Kipling at Bateman's. London: National Trust. ISBN 978-1-84359-452-9. OCLC 944313789.
- Jenkins, Simon (2003). England's Thousand Best Houses. London: Penguin Books. ISBN 0-713-99596-3.
- Nicolson, Adam (1999). Bateman's. London: National Trust. ISBN 9781843591368. OCLC 967909099.
- Ricketts, Harry (2000). Rudyard Kipling: A Life. London: Carroll & Graf. p. 388. ISBN 978-0-7867-0830-7.
- Wilmshurst, Alan (2020). Park Mill at Bateman's. Swindon, UK: National Trust.
