= List of James Bond vehicles =

Throughout the James Bond series of films and novels, Q Branch has given Bond a variety of vehicles with which to battle his enemies. Among the most noteworthy gadgets, Bond has been equipped with various vehicles that have numerous modifications to include elaborate weapons and anti-pursuit systems, alternative transportation modes, and various other functions. One car in particular that has been linked to Mr. Bond's collection is the Aston Martin DB5.

This is a list of noteworthy vehicles seen in James Bond, used by either Bond himself, his allies, or his enemies.

== Vehicles in films ==
=== Cars and trucks ===
Vehicle	Owner	Notes
Dr. No (1962)
Ford Anglia 105E (1960)	John Strangways	In the Queen's Club parking lot, Strangways is shot beside his car by the "Three Blind Mice."
LaSalle Funeral Coach (1939)	"Three Blind Mice"	Used as a getaway car after the murder of Strangways. Appears again later in the film chasing Bond in the Blue Mountains. A Humber Super Snipe MK II was used as a stand-in when the vehicle drives off a cliff.
Chevrolet Bel Air (1957)	stolen	Dr No's henchman "Mr Jones" picks up Bond from Palisadoes Airport in this stolen car. After Jones dies, Bond drives the car to Government House, making it the first car Bond drives in the series. A speedometer close-up is actually from a 1957 Ford.
Chevrolet Impala (1961)	CIA	Leiter and Quarrel trail Bond from the airport in this car.
Ford Consul Mk. II (1959)	Superintendent Duff	Duff and Bond take this car from Government House to visit Strangways's house. Later, Duff uses this car to pick up Miss Taro from her house.
Austin Cambridge A55 (1959)	Yellow Cab Company	Bond takes this cab to the harbour to meet Quarrel. He later takes another Yellow Cab from Pus-Feller's back to the hotel.
Vauxhall PA Velox (1961)	R. J. Dent	Dent drives to the pier to take a boat to Crab Key to warn Dr. No of Bond's investigation.
Sunbeam Alpine (1961)	rental	Bond hires this car and takes it to Miss Taro's home in the Blue Mountains. This was Bond's first car.
From Russia with Love (1963)
Bentley 3.5 Litre drophead coupé Park Ward (1938)	MI6	Near the beginning of the film, this car appears parked. No details about the car appear in the film, however, based on the dialogue from Goldfinger this is James Bond's first Q Branch equipped vehicle. After Bond asks about it, Q responds, "It's had its day, I'm afraid. M's orders, 007." The only gadget that is visible is a car phone. The car in the film is chassis no. B4MR (body no. 3626) and has number plate EYX 393. Bentley initially kept it for trials and in 1941 sold it to Lt. P. W. Pedley.
Rolls-Royce Silver Wraith (1958)	Ali Kerim Bey	Kerim's son chauffeurs Bond from Yesilköy Airport in this car. The car's chassis is number LELW21.
Citroën 11 Légère (1948)	Bulgarian agents	Agents follow Bond through Istanbul. Spectre assassin Donald "Red" Grant steals the car and uses it to follow Bond.
Ford Ranch Wagon (1960)	Ali Kerim Bey	Bond and Kerim take this wagon to the gypsy camp. It appears later driven by one of Kerim's sons to the rendezvous with the Orient Express. The vehicle in the first scene was a two-door, while the one that appears later in the film was a four-door.
Chevrolet C30 Apache (1961)	Rukotvorine Pikva	A SPECTRE henchman uses this truck for the intended meeting with Grant. The name "Pikva" on the door is likely a misspelling of Pivka, Slovenia.
Goldfinger (1964)
Aston Martin DB5 (1964)	MI6	There were a total of four Goldfinger DB5s. Two of these were used in filming and two were used only for promotional purposes. The first filming car, DP/2161/1, was added with gadgets. This DB5 was the original prototype and was painted Dubonnet Red. Before it appeared in Goldfinger, it was used in episode 2.17, "The Noble Sportsman," of The Saint. On 18 June 1997, it was stolen in Florida from its owner, Anthony Pugliese. In August 2021 the Telegraph reported that Art Recovery International had found the car in the Middle East. The second filming car, DB5/1486/R, was used for driving scenes and had no gadgets. After filming, gadgets were added and the car was used for promotion. It features the pop-out gun barrels behind the front indicators, the bullet shield behind the rear window, and a three-way revolving front number plate showing "LU 6789" or "4711-EA-62" or "BMT 216A." In 2010, RM Auctions sold the car for $4.6 million to Harry Yeaggy. The first publicity car, DB5/2017/R, now belongs to the Louwman Museum in The Hague. The second publicity car, DB5/2008/R, was auctioned by RM Sotheby's in August 2019 for $6.4 million to an unknown buyer.
Rolls-Royce Phantom III (1937)	Auric Goldfinger	The Goldfinger Rolls-Royce was built in 1937 for Urban Huttleston Broughton, 1st Baron Fairhaven. In 1962 he sold the car to Eon. The car used in the film is chassis no. 3BU168, a Barker sedanca de ville. Between 1986 and 2000 it was owned by Steven Greenberg. It is still in private ownership.
Ford Mustang (1964)	Tilly Masterton	White over red 1964½ convertible. Called the T-5 in Europe. Its tires and lower portion of the right side were slashed by Bond's Aston Martin DB5.
Mercedes-Benz 190 (1956)	Auric Goldfinger	At least two black 190s appear in the chase scene, plates NE 9641 and NE 5961.
Mercedes-Benz 220 SE (1959)	Auric Goldfinger	After Bond is captured in the forest, Odd Job takes this car back to the factory. The car is painted Blue Grey over a red interior, contrasting with the black 190s.
Ford Country Squire (1964)	Auric Goldfinger	Odd Job drives Bond from Blue Grass Field to Auric Stud Farms in this wagon.
Ford Thunderbird (1964)	Felix Leiter	Leiter drives this white convertible with a black top while in Louisville.
Lincoln Continental (1964)	Auric Goldfinger	Mr. Solo is shot in the backseat by Oddjob and the vehicle is driven to a junkyard and crushed in a baling press. The vehicle which is crushed is a 1963 model with its engine removed. Later in the film, a pair (a sedan and a convertible) bring Bond to the airport on behalf of the U.S. Government.
Ford Ranchero (1964)	Auric Goldfinger	Driven by Oddjob to carry the crushed Lincoln back to the Goldfinger's Kentucky horse farm.
Lincoln Continental (1964)	United States Government	The final car that appears in the film is a Continental convertible that drives Bond to the airport for his flight to Washington.
Thunderball (1965)
Lincoln Continental Executive Limousine (1964)	Jacques Bouvoir	At the beginning of the film, Bouvoir is driven in a 1964 Lincoln Continental Lehmann-Peterson limousine from the funeral at the Chateau d'Anet.
Aston Martin DB5 (1965)	MI6	Appears in the pre-credits sequence as Bond makes his escape, where the rear-facing water cannon are activated (this gadget was not referred to in Goldfinger), and this fades into the aquatically themed credits sequence. Both of the filming cars from Goldfinger appear in Thunderball.
Ford Thunderbird (1965)	Emilio Largo	Largo arrives at SPECTRE's Paris headquarters, No. 35 Avenue d'Eylau, in this car. Its plates are CZ421.
Ford Fairlane 500 Skyliner (1957)	Count Lippe	As a punishment for failing to dispose of Bond, Lippe is killed in his Fairlane, which is blown up by villainess Fiona Volpe using rocket launchers mounted on her BSA motorbike.
Mercedes-Benz 190 Ambulance (1964)	Shrublands	Brings François Derval's body to the hospital. Seen again in the background as Bond leaves the next morning.
Ford Zephyr 4 (1962)	Royal Air Force	Shuttles Angelo Palazzi from hotel to RAF station.
Triumph Herald 1200 (1964)	Quist	Largo's henchman Quist drives this car to "Palmyra" before being killed.
Ford Mustang (1965)	Fiona Volpe	After picking Bond up along the road, Fiona Volpe drives him to the Coral Harbour Hotel.
Lincoln Continental (1965)	rental	In the Bahamas, Bond drives a 1965 Continental convertible in Powder Blue with a white top.
Ford Country Sedan (1965)	Emilio Largo	Volpe takes Bond in this station wagon after she captures him.
GMC C-Series (1962)	Emilio Largo	Carries Largo's team of divers.
You Only Live Twice (1967)
Toyota 2000GT (1967)	Aki	Used by Aki during Bond's time in Tokyo. This vehicle was unique as the 2000GT did not have a convertible version. Due to his height, Connery could not fit in the car, and thus Toyota built one-off cars for the film. Eon ordered two cars, one for filming and one for backup. After the shooting was completed, the filming car was sent to England for promotional use. At this time it was customized with gadgets by John Stears. At some point around the film's release, it disappeared and its whereabouts are unknown. The second car was displayed in March 1967 at the Geneva Motor Show and was then used at the Fuji Speedway as a course car. In 1977 Toyota purchased it from its owner in Hawaii, and it is on display at the Toyota Automobile Museum.
Dodge Polara (1964)	Osato Chemicals and Engineering	Used by Osato's henchmen as a getaway car after the murder of Dikko Henderson.
Toyopet Crown Deluxe (1966)	Osato Chemicals and Engineering	Chases Bond and Aki after meeting at Osato Chemicals. A Kawasaki KV-107II picks it up with a magnet and drops it in Tokyo Bay.
Pontiac Parisienne (1966)	MI6	This gold convertible is seen in Q's workshop in Kagoshima when Bond comes to see Little Nellie. The vehicle is a right-hand drive model.
On Her Majesty's Secret Service (1969)
Aston Martin DBS (1968)	MI6	The car was seen in four scenes, including the pre-credits teaser and as James and Tracy's wedding car. The car has a hiding place for a sniper rifle in the glovebox. It was not fitted with bulletproof glass as per the end of that film. The DBS is glimpsed in the subsequent film, Diamonds Are Forever, parked up in Q Branch back in London when Bond calls Q from Amsterdam. Two cars were lent by Aston for On Her Majesty's Secret Service: DBS/5109/R for studio scenes and DBS/5234/R for exterior shots. Both used the registration GKX 8G. One of the two cars now belongs to Sigi Zidziunas of Melbourne.
Mercury Cougar XR7 (1969)	Contessa Teresa de Vicenzo	Red on Red 1969 Convertible, driven by Tracy onto a Portuguese beach where she attempts suicide, later in a winter stock-car race on an ice-covered track to help Bond escape from Blofeld's henchmen and Irma Bunt. Three cars were used in the film. The car used in the rally sequence was scrapped after filming. One car, serial 9F94R549292, sold at Bonhams in December 2020 for £356,500. Another is owned by the Ian Fleming Foundation.
Rolls-Royce Silver Shadow (1968)	Marc-Ange Draco	Has license plate: 6640 TT 75
Rolls-Royce Phantom IV (1954)	M	Car is seen parked at M's house, "Quarterdeck." This car is chassis number 4BP7 and was built for Princess Margaret, who used it under the registration PM 6450. A Pegasus emblem adorns the radiator. In 1967 she sold it to A. W. D. Adams, who registered it as 302 HYP, which is how it appears in the film. In June 2021 it was sold by RM Sotheby's for ₣ 2.25 million (it is currently SORN under its original registration number).
Volkswagen Beetle (1969)	Shaun Campbell	After Bond's arrival at Lauterbrunnen railway station, Campbell follows the sleigh carrying Bond to the helicopter.
Mercedes-Benz 220S (1963)	Ernst Stavro Blofeld	Chases Bond through village after his escape from Piz Gloria.
Mercedes-Benz 600 (1964)	Ernst Stavro Blofeld	Silver SWB – Irma Bundt shot newlywed Tracy Bond from the back seat of the parked vehicle in an attempt to kill James Bond for revenge.
Diamonds Are Forever (1971)
Triumph Stag (1970)	Peter Franks	Commandeered by Bond at the Port of Dover and takes it to Amsterdam. The car in the film is a pre-production Mark I, build number LD14. It was owned for a time by the Cars of the Stars Motor Museum and in 2011 was purchased by Michael Dezer. In 2014 Dezer sold it to an unknown buyer.
Cadillac Funeral Coach (1968)	Slumber, Inc.	The hearse picks up Peter Franks's casket at Los Angeles International Airport. The coach is a Superior Sovereign Landaulet.
Plymouth Fury (1971)	CIA	After losing Tiffany at Circus Circus, Felix takes this car to meet Bond.
Ford Galaxie 500 (1971)	Hertz	Bond rents this car in anticipation of picking Tiffany Case up after she gets the diamonds at Circus Circus.
Ford Mustang Mach 1 (1971)	Tiffany Case	The highlight of the Las Vegas car chase is the Mustang balancing on two side wheels to drive through a narrow alley.
Ford Econoline (1971)	Whyte Tectronics	Saxby picks up the diamonds from McCarran Airport and then trades vehicles with Metz at a gas station. After Tiffany creates a diversion in the gas station, Bond sneaks into the back of the van to gain access to the Whyte Tectronics facility.
Lincoln Continental (1971)	Willard Whyte	Metz takes this car to the gas station, where he and Saxby trade vehicles.
Ford Custom 500 (1971)	Whyte Tectronics	Three cars go in pursuit of Bond in the stolen moon buggy and are destroyed or damaged in the ensuing chase through the desert.
Ford Custom (1971)	Clark County Sheriff's Department	During the chase, the Sheriff attempts the same two-wheel maneuver as Bond.
Ford Custom (1970)	Las Vegas Police Department	Several LVPD squad cars chase Bond in downtown Las Vegas.
Ford Thunderbird (1971)	Mister Wint and Mister Kidd	Used to transport Bond from the basement of the Whyte House out to the Nevada desert to have him buried alive in an underground pipe.
Ford Custom (1970)	CIA	Two black Ford Customs take Bond, Leiter, and other agents to the house where Whyte is being held.
Mercedes-Benz 600 (1968)	Ernst Stavro Blofeld	Silver LWB – Blofeld leaves the casino dressed in drag and Tiffany Case is thrown into the back.
Live and Let Die (1973)
Cadillac Fleetwood 60 Special Brougham	Kananga	Used to transport Kananga and his entourage from the United Nations to Harlem.
Checker Taxicab		Bond takes this taxicab to tailgate Kananga's Cadillac to Harlem.
Chevrolet Impala	James Bond (1963 convertible while in San Monique) / Kananga's henchmen / J.W.Pepper / Louisiana State Police / New York City taxicab	Various 1973 Chevrolets appear throughout the film. During the car chase down Manhattan's FDR Drive, nearly all the cars which Bond's out-of-control taxicab encounters are 1973 Impalas and Chevelles.
Chevrolet Chevelle	Unmarked Louisiana State Police car	
Chevrolet Nova	San Monique Police, Kananga's henchmen in New Orleans	Two of these police cars are seen chasing Bond's stolen AEC Regent RT-type-double-decker bus with three motorcycles across San Monique. Also seen chasing Bond's stolen Cessna 170A around an airfield in New Orleans.
Corvorado	Kananga/Mr. Big	This is a combination of a Chevy Corvette and a Cadillac El Dorado, custom made by Dunham coaches (which was known at the time for its customized pimpmobiles). It is driven in the film by the Kananga henchmen, Whisper, who fires a poison dart from its side mirror at the driver of Bond's taxi.
The Man with the Golden Gun (1974)
AMC Hornet	American Motors Car dealership	Featured in The Man with the Golden Gun. Bond steals this red 1974 hatchback from an AMC dealership in Bangkok, Thailand. He makes his exit by crashing through the showroom window. unknowing that Sheriff J.W. Pepper was in it looking to test drive it. A Hornet was also used for the famous twisting corkscrew aerial jump that was captured in just one filming sequence. A special modified car performed the stunt with a lower stance and larger wheel wells (just as the Astro Spiral Javelin stunt cars that performed that same jump in AMC sponsored thrill shows) compared to the stock Hornet X model in all of its other appearances in the film. Seven tests were performed in advance before the one jump performed by an uncredited British stuntman "Bumps" Willert for the film with six (or 8, depending on the source) cameras simultaneously rolling. Two frogmen were positioned in the water, as well as an emergency vehicle and a crane were ready, but not needed. An engineer at the Cornell Aeronautical Laboratory (CAL) used computer modeling to calculate the stunt and specified 1,460.06 kilograms (3,219 lb) for the weight of car and driver, the exact angles and the 15.86-metre (52 ft) distance between the ramps, as well as the 64.36-kilometre-per-hour (40 mph) launch speed. This vehicle is on display at the National Motor Museum in Beaulieu, Hampshire. The ramps and the modified jump car are still in the possession of the Jay Milligan's stunt company, JM Productions in Hamburg, New York.
AMC Matador coupe	Francisco Scaramanga and Nick Nack	The featured car in The Man with the Golden Gun. "Bond is foiled by perhaps the best trick a getaway car has ever performed; the Matador transforms into a plane." Francisco Scaramanga and Nick Nack use this 1974 car to kidnap Mary Goodnight and make their escape. In the film, the Matador coupe is converted into a 'car plane' to fly from Bangkok to an island in the China Sea. With the flight tail unit, the complete machine was 9.15 metres (30 ft) long, 12.80 metres (42 ft) wide, and 3.08 metres (10 ft) high and the "flying AMC Matador" was exhibited at auto shows; however, it could only make a 500-metre (1,640 ft) flight so for the film's aerial sequences it was replaced by a 1-metre (39 in) remote controlled model. Transformation of the AMC Matador into a light airplane occurred when wings and flight tail unit were attached to the actual car (that served as the fuselage and landing gear) and a stuntman drove the 'car plane' to a runway at which point the scene cut to the radio-controlled scale model built by John Stears. See Aircraft section below.
AMC Matador sedan	Bangkok Police	The featured police car in The Man with the Golden Gun. The 1974 Matador used in the chase is a left-hand drive model although Thailand operates with UK style left-hand traffic rules.
MGB	Mary Goodnight	This tan MGB is owned by Hong Kong's MI6 agent Mary Goodnight. She and Bond follow Andrea Anders in her dark green Rolls-Royce; they end up at the Peninsula Hotel where Bond discovers that they have a fleet of dark green Rolls-Royces.
Mercedes-Benz W115	Lieutenant Hip	
Rolls-Royce Silver Shadow	Peninsula Hotel	
Toyota Celica GT	Francisco Scaramanga	Briefly seen in The Man with the Golden Gun, Scaramanga and Nicknack get out and into his boat.
The Spy Who Loved Me (1977)
Leyland Sherpa van	Jaws	Used by Jaws posing as a telephone engineer. He subsequently tears it apart trying to thwart Bond and Anya's escape. The van's engine eventually overheats and seizes in the middle of the desert
Ford Taunus 2.3 Ghia	Jaws and Stromberg's henchmen	The windscreen is sprayed with paint by Bond's Lotus Esprit and the driver loses control. As result, the car careers off a mountainside and crashes through a barn roof. Jaws walks away from the crash unscathed.
Lotus Esprit S1 "Wet Nellie"	MI6	Delivered to Bond by Q in Sardinia, this Lotus Esprit is capable of transforming into a submarine. In this mode, it is equipped with anti-aircraft missiles (wherein one was used to take down the helicopter hovering above 007 and XXX). This car is on display in the National Motor Museum, Beaulieu. RM Auctions auctioned the white Lotus Esprit submarine in London on September 9, 2013, for £550,000 ($865,000).
Moonraker (1979)
AMC Concord	Drax Industries	A 1978 D/L station wagon is seen in Moonraker where Bond and Hugo Drax are pigeon hunting.
Jeep Wagoneer		Bond is seen briefly driving the Jeep through some caves.
Hispano-Suiza J12 cabriolet (1936)	Hugo Drax	
Chevrolet C-10 ambulance	Hugo Drax	Drax's men, disguised as paramedics, capture Bond and Holly Goodhead
Rolls-Royce Silver Shadow I LWB	Bond's Hotel	Long wheelbase model
MP Lafer Cabriolet	Manuela, MI6's contact in Rio	The car Manuela uses to tail Bond to the hotel in Rio.
For Your Eyes Only (1981)
Citroën 2CV	Melina Havelock	Used in a major car chase, after Bond's own car – Lotus Esprit Turbo – explodes. Bond and love interest Melina Havelock are pursued by evil henchmen in Peugeot 504s. The chase includes a hairpin road, an olive orchard, and a village. At one point the 2CV is on its side and is righted by hand. Bond and Havelock dispatch their pursuers with car accidents and make their escape. The car is on display at the Orlando Auto Museum in Florida.
Lotus Esprit Turbo	MI6	Two Esprits are featured in this film. The first, a white model driven by Bond in Spain, is destroyed when a thug trips its self-destruct system by breaking the driver's side window (with a sticker labeled "burglar protected"). The second one is a bronze model driven by Bond at a ski resort in Northern Italy. The two cars were not repainted Essex-spec Turbo Esprits, but specially commissioned cars. The car is on display at the Orlando Auto Museum in Florida.
Mercedes-Benz 450 SEL	Emile Locque	After the raid on Kristatos's base in Albania, Locque attempts to escape Bond in the car by driving along a cliffside road. While driving, he is shot by Bond and loses control, resulting in the car hanging perilously off the edge. Bond kicks the car off the cliff to finish off Locque.
Rolls-Royce Silver Shadow I	Aristotle Kristatos	
Peugeot 504		Two Peugeot 504s used by Hector Gonzales's henchmen to chase Bond and Melina driving with Citroën 2CV.
Octopussy (1983)
Alfa Romeo GTV6	Civilian	Bond steals the parked car while its owner uses a pay phone booth and makes haste towards Octopussy's Circus, pursued by two Bavarian BMW police cars.
BMW 518i	West German police	Two of these cars are seen in a short chase scene when Bond commandeers an Alfa Romeo GTV6 and makes haste towards Octopussy's circus. These two cars are in pursuit.
Austin FX4 taxi	British Intelligence	Used by Smithers to follow Kamal Khan from Sotheby's.
Range Rover Classic convertible		Used to tow the horse box containing the Acrostar Jet.
Mercedes-Benz 600	Kamal Khan	Kamal Khan leaves Sotheby's in a 600.
Mercedes 250SE	General Orlov	After the tires get torn off by a stinger device, Bond drives the car on the railway tracks in pursuit of the circus train. It was subsequently hit by a train coming down the opposite line and thrown into a river. It is later seen being recovered via crane and covered in seaweed.
Volkswagen Beetle	German couple	Bond hitchhikes a ride in this car to the US air base after the train chase.
Rolls-Royce Phantom II	Kamal Khan	
A View to a Kill (1985)
Jeep Cherokee (XJ)	Stacey Sutton	Featured in A View to a Kill where Stacey is seen driving home.
Ford Bronco	Chuck Lee	
Ford LTD	rental	Bond uses this car to pursue Stacy to Oakland.
Chevrolet Corvette (C4)	Pola Ivanova	
Cadillac Fleetwood 75 limousine	Henchmen of Max Zorin	
Rolls-Royce Silver Cloud II	Sir Godfrey Tibbet	After Tibbet's murder, his corpse and an unconscious Bond are pushed into a lake in the car by May Day and Max Zorin. (The car in the film was owned by producer Cubby Broccoli)
Dodge Diplomat/Dodge Monaco	San Francisco Police Department	Featured in A View to a Kill as a San Francisco Police Department patrol car. A few late 1970s Dodge Monacos were seen, along with a Plymouth Volaré seen outside San Francisco City Hall. Late 1980s Diplomats were also featured in Licence to Kill as the squad cars in Key West, Florida (some may have been identical Plymouth Gran Furys).
Renault 11		Featured in A View to a Kill, Bond commandeers this car and takes it on a pursuit through Paris. He drives the car on stairs, under barriers, and on top of buses. During the pursuit, the car has its roof chopped off and Bond continues to drive even after the entire back half of the car is ripped off.
Renault Fuego		Used in A View to a Kill to transport the Bond Girl.
Range Rover Classic	Zorin Industries	Two 5-door Range Rovers were used by Zorin's henchmen in France.
The Living Daylights (1987)
Aston Martin V8 Vantage Volante	MI6	A convertible, it is later "winterised" with a hardtop. It comes with all the usual refinements, including extending side outriggers, spike-producing tires, missiles, lasers (an update of the DB5's tire-slashers), signal-intercepting smart radio, head-up display, and rocket propulsion. It could also self-destruct when primed.
Audi 200 Quattro	Saunders	Used as a part of General Koskov's defection and escape to Austria. This was an 'Exclusiv' model with flared wheel arches and 41-centimetre (16 in) BBS RS split-rim alloy wheels. The car has a Vienna registration, W 207.182. The car is in the ownership of the Audi Museum in Ingolstadt, Germany.
Audi 200 Quattro Avant	British Intelligence	This was the estate version of the Audi 200 saloon (See above). The car's Moroccan registration number is 5196–33.
VAZ-2106	Czechoslovak Law Enforcement	Several are engaged in the pursuit and are destroyed at the hands of Bond's Aston Martin, the first is cut in half by the Aston's laser tyre shredder, the second is sunk into a frozen lake after the Aston cuts a hole in the ice, while another plummets from a ramp and goes through a shed.
VAZ-2105	KGB	Used by a KGB agent to tail Kara Milovy.
Rover 800	British Government	Appears outside the Blayden Safe House, and in the emergency response convoy shortly after Necros's attack.
GMC Vandura Ambulance	Government of Morocco	Driven by Necros, this ambulance is only featured for a short time. During the short scene, Necros drives the ambulance from the airport terminal in Tangier across the tarmac to Koskov's plane, with the drugged Bond in the back.
Land Rover Series III	British SAS	Crashes off the Rock of Gibraltar and explodes in the pre-credits sequence
Range Rover Classic	British Government	Appears outside the Blayden Safe House.
Land Rover Series III (Armoured)	Red Army	Used by Bond and Milovy in their escape from the C-130 Hercules shortly before it crashes.
Mercedes-Benz W114	Pushkin's motorcade	
Dodge WC 51	Red Army	Used by Koskov to chase Bond and Milovy before it was destroyed.
Licence to Kill (1989)
Jeep CJ-7	Henchman Perez	A 1976 Renegade-II is seen in Licence to Kill. It is used by Sanchez's henchman Perez, who fires a FIM-92 Stinger missile at a commandeered oil tanker where Bond does a wheelie (in this scene, Bond crushes the Jeep).
Ford Grand Marquis stretched limousine	Truman-Lodge	
Lincoln Mark VII LSC	rental	Bond hires this car in Miami.
Chevrolet Caprice	Fallon (MI6 agent seen after Bond's capture by Hong Kong Narcotics)	
Rolls-Royce Silver Shadow II	Hotel de Isthmus	Q poses as Bond's chaffeur in Isthmus City
Maserati Biturbo 425i	Franz Sanchez	Used by Franz Sanchez during the tanker pursuit scene. It was later abandoned.
Dodge Ram		Seen in Licence To Kill during the tanker pursuit scene.
GoldenEye (1995)
Aston Martin DB5	James Bond	Driven in the opening scenes by Bond, whilst racing a Ferrari.
Ferrari F355 GTS	Xenia Onatopp	Xenia Onatopp playfully races James Bond in his Aston Martin DB5 by chance on the mountain roads behind Monte Carlo in this vehicle, which is later revealed to have false French registration plates, hinting that it may be stolen. Another 355 appears twice in Die Another Day during the opening sequence and later on in the An-124 airplane. It is then pushed out of the plane along with the Lamborghini Diablo.
VAZ-2106	St. Petersburg Police	Several go in pursuit of Bond in the stolen tank, but all are destroyed in various collisions.
BMW Z3	MI6	Supposedly equipped with 'Stinger' missiles and other armaments, which are never seen or used except for a deployable parachute and auto-HUD. Car is left-hand drive. Total screen time less than two minutes.
Mercedes W140	French Navy	
GAZ-31029	General Ourumov	This car was used in the film during the car/tank chase in St. Petersburg when Bond was pursuing this car in a Russian T-95 tank.
VAZ-2106	St. Petersburg Police	Used by the police during the car/tank chase scene.
ZAZ-965	Jack Wade	Used by CIA agent Jack Wade to drive Bond from St Petersburg International Airport to Valentin Zukovsky's building complex.
Tomorrow Never Dies (1997)
Jeep Cherokee (XJ)	Wai Lin	A 1994 XJ Cherokee right-hand drive export model is seen in front of Wai Lin's hideout.
Aston Martin DB5	James Bond	Seen parked in the front quadrangle of New College, a college of the University of Oxford and driven by Bond in a transitional scene of Bond arriving at the Ministry of Defence.
BMW 750iL	MI6	Loaned to Bond by Q at an Avis rental station in Germany, this car is equipped with missile launchers, caltrops, self-inflating tires, and a near-impenetrable body. The BMW can be remotely controlled via a special Ericsson cell phone. During a chase inside a carpark, Bond exits the car and remotely drives it to the rooftop, sending it flying off the carpark before crash-landing into an Avis station across the street.
Daimler Limousine	British Government	
Ford Scorpio	Elliot Carver's henchmen	
Vauxhall Omega	British Government	Are seen as part of the motorcade carrying M and Bond from the Ministry of Defence
Opel Senator	Carver's Henchman	Is destroyed by a rocket fired from Bond's BMW 750i in the chase through the multi-storey parking lot.
Range Rover (P38A)	Elliot Carver	Used to pursue Bond through the streets of Saigon
Mercedes W126s	Elliot Carver's henchmen	
The World Is Not Enough (1999)
Aston Martin DB5		Seen parked at the funeral of Sir Robert King. A thermal image of the DB5 is briefly shown towards the end of the film.
VAZ-2121	Sasha Davidov	After killing Davidov, Bond uses the car whilst infiltrating Renard's operation.
BMW Z8	MI6	Cut in half by chopper after firing one shot from a surface-to-air missile (SAM). Other gadgets involve a key that can summon the vehicle and a hidden remote control within the steering wheel.
Rolls-Royce Silver Shadow II	Valentin Zukovsky	
Die Another Day (2002)
Aston Martin V12 Vanquish	MI6	The car is equipped with all the usual refinements, including front-firing rockets between two machine guns, hood-mounted target-seeking shotguns, spike-producing tires, again and a passenger ejector seat in homage to the original Aston Martin DB5, but used here in a clever bit of improvisation by 007 to right the car when it has been flipped onto its roof. The Aston was also equipped with "adaptive camouflage" – a cloaking device that allowed it to become effectively invisible at the push of a button. This vehicle was also featured in the video games Nightfire (2002), Everything or Nothing (2004) and 007 Legends
Ferrari F355 Berlinetta	Colonel Tan-Sun Moon	Part of Colonel Moon's car collection. Later fallen off Gustav Graves's plane and landed on a farm paddy in Korea.
Ford Thunderbird	Giacinta Jinx Johnson	
Ford Fairlane	James Bond	Ford Fairlane is briefly driven by Bond during his visit to Cuba in Die Another Day. A homage to Thunderball where villain Count Lippe drives a 1957 Ford Fairlane Skyliner.
Ford GT40	Colonel Tan-Sun Moon (Gustav Graves)	Part of Colonel Moon's car collection. Shown parked at the North Korean military base near the DMZ. Later shown inside Graves's plane where it falls off and is presumably destroyed.
Lamborghini Diablo	Colonel Tan-Sun Moon (Gustav Graves)	Part of Colonel Moon's car collection. Fallen off Graves's plane and landed on a farm paddy in Korea.
Mercedes-Benz SL	Colonel Tan-Sun Moon	Part of Colonel Moon's car collection.
Porsche 911 Carrera 4	Colonel Tan-Sun Moon (Gustav Graves)	Part of Colonel Moon's car collection. Accidentally destroyed by James Bond when he steals a hovercraft to escape.
Jaguar XKR	Zao	Equipped with front grille machine guns, door panel missiles, rear mounted gattling gun and boot mounted mortars. This vehicle is on display at the National Motor Museum, Beaulieu.
Range Rover (L322)	Gustav Graves	Several Range Rover L322s were used by Graves' henchmen.
Casino Royale (2006)
Aston Martin DB5		The DB5 is owned by a gambling villain in the Bahamas, which Bond acquires in a poker game. It has no special modifications.
Aston Martin DBS	MI6	Featured in the third Casino Royale. No special gadget was visible on the DBS other than the secret compartments which housed Bond's Walther P99, and an emergency medkit which includes components of an emergency medical link to MI6 HQ, antidotes to various poisons, and a small defibrillator. The DBS is rolled and destroyed during a high pursuit car chase where 007 swerves to avoid a tied-up Vesper Lynd in the middle of the road.
Ford Crown Victoria Police Interceptor	Miami-Dade Police Department	
Ford Explorer	Miami-Dade Police Department	
Ford Mondeo 2.5 Litre ST		Driven by Bond during his arrival in the Bahamas. This car was later on display in the James Bond Experience at the National Motor Museum, Beaulieu
Jaguar XJ8	Le Chiffre	Used to kidnap Vesper Lynd and drop her off the road so she could be used as bait to lure Bond into a trap.
Jaguar XJ8	Mr. White	A similar Jaguar XJ driven by Mr. White is shown at the end where he goes back to his estate at Lake Como before being captured by Bond.
Range Rover Sport	Ocean Club golfer	Bond deliberately crashes it in a hotel parking lot to serve as a distraction. A black version of the Range Rover Vogue is one of the cars used by Le Chiffre's henchmen.
Quantum of Solace (2008)
Alfa Romeo 159	Villain	Shortly after capturing Mr. White, Bond is chased by two Alfas from Lake Garda to Siena, Italy. Despite sustaining heavy damage, Bond's Aston Martin DBS manages to escape while both Alfas are destroyed.
Alfa Romeo 156	Carabinieri	A police vehicle that honked at pedestrians to clear the way after Bond shot Mitchell.
Aston Martin DBS	MI6	A slightly darker-coloured vehicle to that featured in Casino Royale is heavily damaged after a chase at the beginning of the film in Siena, Italy. The vehicle does not have any gadgets. It transports Mr. White.
Audi A6		
Ford Ka (Hydrogen Fuel Cell Model)	Camille Montes	Used by Camille when she picks up Bond from the hotel
Ford Edge (Hydrogen Fuel Cell Model)	Dominic Greene, later by James Bond	
Ford Bronco II		Stolen by James Bond
Daimler Super V8	Dominic Greene	Dominic Greene is chauffeured from the airport to the Spectre meeting in this car. The government agent Bond chases off the roof falls on the bonnet of the car, before being shot by one of Dominic Greene's henchmen.
Range Rover Sport		Used to drive Bond to Craig Mitchell's apartment in London. Driven by Bond in Bolivia.
Land Rover Defender 90	Carabinieri	Used to chase down Bond and the pursuing thugs only to be knocked over in the opening sequence
Volkswagen Beetle	Camille Montes	Used to pick up Bond at Bolivia
Volvo S40		Hire car used in Austria
Skyfall (2012)
Aston Martin DB5	James Bond	The right-hand drive gadget-filled Aston Martin DB5 inexplicably returned in 2012's Skyfall. Two gadgets are shown on this vehicle, the ejector seat and two front-firing machine guns. This is the first time machine guns have been used in action since 1964's Goldfinger. This car is destroyed in the climactic battle scene. An Aston Martin DB5 appeared in 007: Blood Stone and shared a similar fate to the DB5 in Skyfall.
Audi A5	Patricé	Driven by Patricé in a car chase through Istanbul that precedes the film's opening titles. The car ends up flipped over and he continues his escape on a Honda motorbike.
Jaguar XJ (X351)	British Intelligence	M's official car, used in multiple scenes throughout the film. Last seen driven by James Bond himself as he is chauffeuring M.
Land Rover Defender	British Intelligence	Driven by Eve Moneypenny with James Bond in the passenger seat. Used in a car chase through Istanbul that precedes the film's opening titles.
Range Rover (L322)	British Intelligence/Metropolitan Police Service	Used as police cars and MI6 vehicles in multiple scenes in London.
Land Rover Discovery 4	Metropolitan Police Service	Used to transport Raoul Silva whilst disguised as a police officer, to proceed to the inquiry. It is then driven by Raoul Silva as an escape vehicle after the attack on the inquiry.
Mercedes S400	British government	Driven by Bond in China briefly
Volkswagen New Beetle		During the pre-credits sequence, several of these 2nd Generation Beetles are knocked off the train, and others driven over, by Bond after he commandeers an excavator.
Spectre (2015)
Alfa Romeo 166	Civilian	A car probably owned by a Roman and destroyed by Bond.
Aston Martin DB10	MI6	Bond absconds to Rome with the vehicle. Gadgets include a rear-facing double-barreled gun sticking out of the Aston Martin badge (that Q forgot to load ammo with), a rear-facing flamethrower, and an ejection seat with a parachute. Following a chase and successful ejection, Bond sinks the car in the Tiber.
Aston Martin DB5	James Bond	The DB5 from Skyfall is found in Q's lab, in the process of being rebuilt, and is seen completed at the end of the film, to be driven from MI6 by 007.
Aston Martin DB9	MI6	Shown in Q's lab
Fiat 500	Civilian	A car owned by a Roman in which Bond uses his car to push out of the way resulting its driver to hit a nearby pole causing the airbag to be activated during a chase in Rome.
Hyundai ix35	Metropolitan Police Service	Shown parked at Thames during an operation to stop Blofeld
Hyundai i40	Metropolitan Police Service	Shown parked at Thames during an operation to capture Blofeld
Hyundai Santa Fe		Shown parked at Thames during an operation to capture Blofeld
Jaguar C-X75	Mr. Hinx	Used by Mr. Hinx to pursue Bond (who drives the Aston Martin DB10) across Rome. In the car chase, Bond sets the front end on fire by activating his DB10's flamethrower hidden in the exhaust. Mr. Hinx gives up chasing Bond when Bond ejects from the DB10, sinking it in the Tiber.
Jaguar XJ8	British Intelligence	M's car, destroyed in an ambush set up by Ernst Stavro Blofeld's henchmen.
Land Rover Defender Bigfoot	SPECTRE	Used by Mr. Hinx and a team of SPECTRE mercenaries to capture Madeleine Swann and take her away.
Range Rover Sport	SPECTRE	Used by Mr. Hinx and a team of SPECTRE mercenaries to capture Madeleine Swann and take her away.
Discovery Sport	British Intelligence	
Mercedes S-Class	Lucia Sciarra	Shown arriving at her house in Rome.
Rolls-Royce Silver Wraith	Ernst Stavro Blofeld	The car, a red and black 1948 model, is driven by one of Blofeld's assistants to pick up Bond and Dr. Madeleine Swann from the train station on their way to Blofeld's compound in North Africa.
Toyota Hilux	SPECTRE	Used to set up an ambush by crashing into M's Jaguar XJ8 so James Bond could be captured.
No Time to Die (2021)
Aston Martin DB5	James Bond	Following its rebuild, it is used by Bond who drives it to go to Matera along with Madeleine for vacation. Bond uses it when he and Madeleine escape from Matera during an ambush set up by Spectre assassins led by Primo. In the film, the DB5 is equipped with M134 miniguns that pop out in the front headlights, a mine dispenser on the rear bumper, as well as the classic smokescreen device.
Aston Martin Vantage	James Bond, Madeleine Swann	Shown when Bond uses it to return to MI6. Also used to go to Norway where Bond finds out Madeleine has a daughter. Later driven by Madeleine at the end of the film where she takes her daughter Mathilde to Matera.
Aston Martin DBS Superleggera	MI6	Seen when Nomi picks up Bond to go to the airport for their mission to infiltrate Safin's base to rescue Madeleine and Mathilde as well as to foil his plot from unleashing the nanobots all over the world.
Aston Martin Valhalla	MI6	Shown sitting in a wind tunnel at Q-Branch.
Chevrolet Bel Air	Stolen by Paloma	A 1957 Chevrolet Bel Air is used by a Spectre agent in an attempt to kill Bond and Paloma while investigating a SPECTRE meeting in Cuba. Paloma later steals it in an attempt to ram over a structure so Vladvo can be captured.
Land Rover Series I	Spectre	Used to track down Bond and Madeleine at Matera.
Jaguar XF	Spectre	Used to chase down Bond and Madeleine at Matera.
Lancia Thesis	SPECTRE	Used to chase down Bond and Madeleine at Matera. Bond destroys one using cluster bombs in his DB5.
Land Rover Series III	James Bond	Used as Bond's vehicle when residing in Jamaica.
Land Rover Defender (L663)	Various armed men under Logan Ash	Used by forces led by Logan Ash to track down Bond, Madeleine, and Mathilde in Norway. One Defender crashes when Bond lures it to a nearby hillside. A second Defender is destroyed by Bond who uses a grenade from his machine gun before killing its driver. Bond uses the vehicle's grappling hook device to lure a biker. A third Land Rover Defender tries to ram over Bond with Logan Ash riding it as a passenger to kill Bond, though the vehicle hits a downed tree trunk and flips over.
Range Rover Sport	Various armed men under Logan Ash	Range Rover Sport SUVs are used by Logan Ash's men to track down Bond, Madeleine, and Mathilde in Norway.
Lada Riva	Cuba Police	Shown arriving at the scene attempting to arrest Nomi, Bond, and Paloma, though Nomi users her gun to shoot a power grid as a distraction so Bond can escape.
Maserati Quattroporte	Spectre	Used by a Spectre agent to ram over James Bond in an attempt to kill him at Matera
Toyota Corolla	Felix Leiter	Felix uses this car while in Jamaica to recruit Bond from retirement
Toyota Land Cruiser Prado	Madeleine	Madeleine's SUV, Bond drives the vehicle when they are forced to escape Norway from mercenaries led by Logan Ash

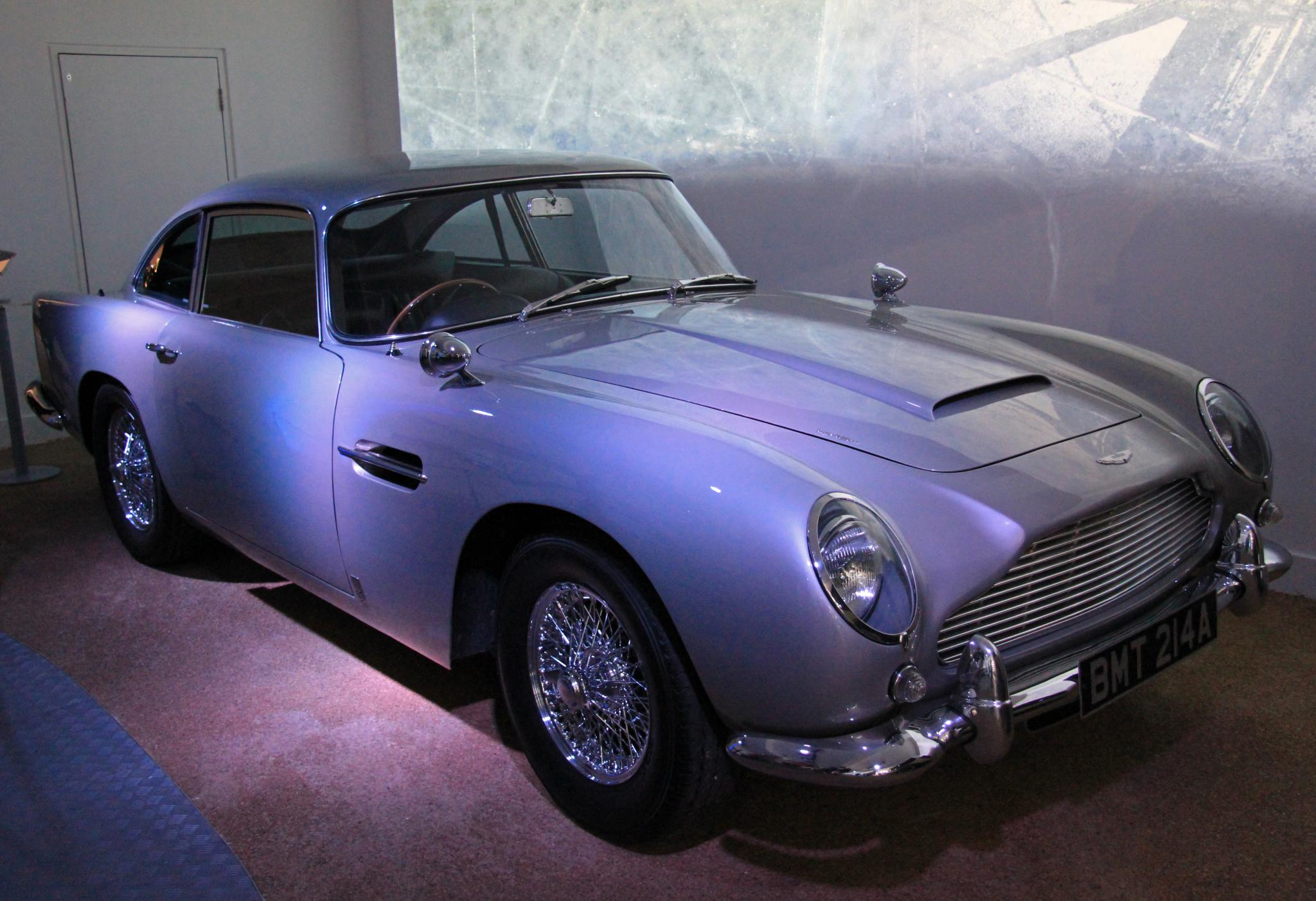
Aston Martin DB5 from Goldfinger and Thunderball

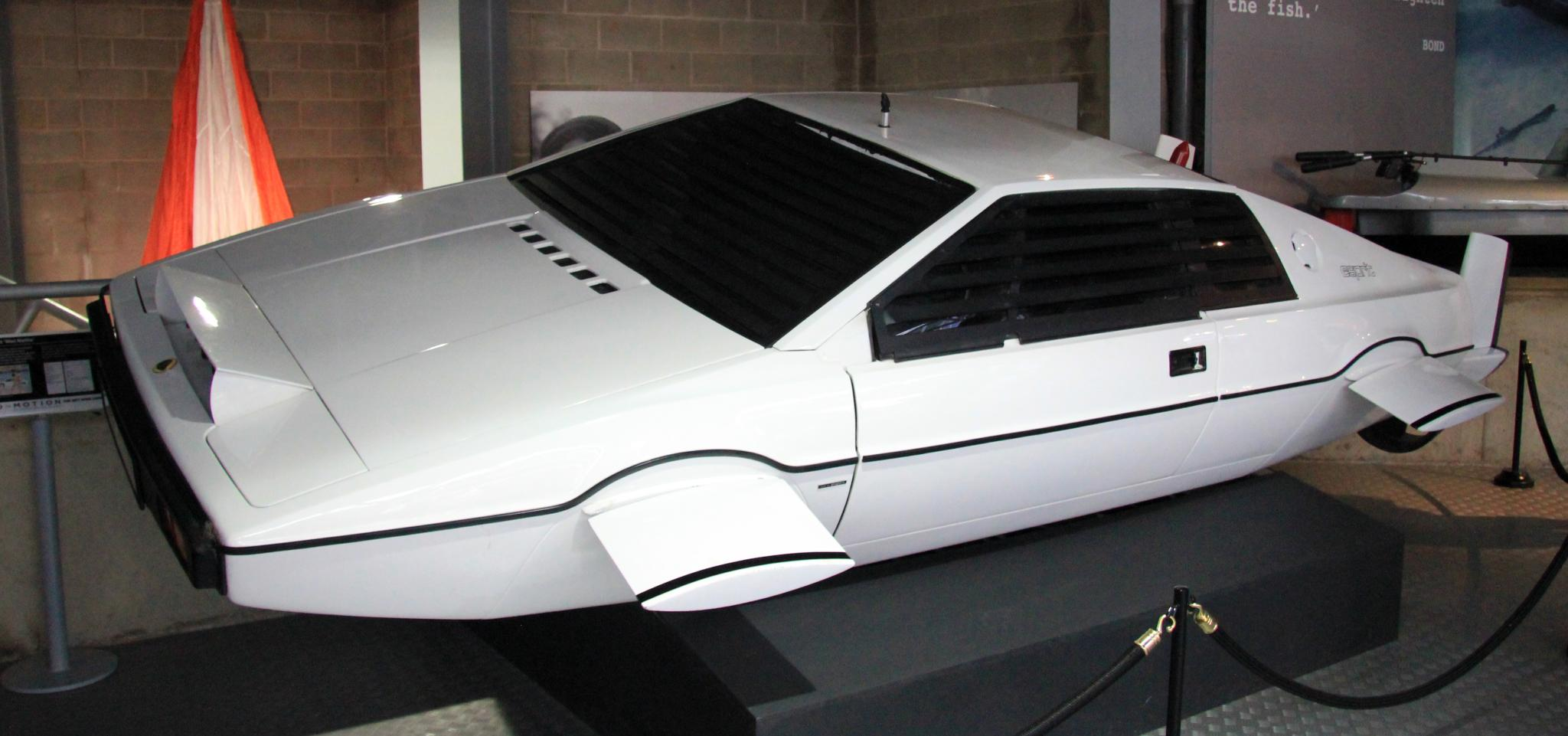
Lotus Esprit "Wet Nellie" from The Spy Who Loved Me

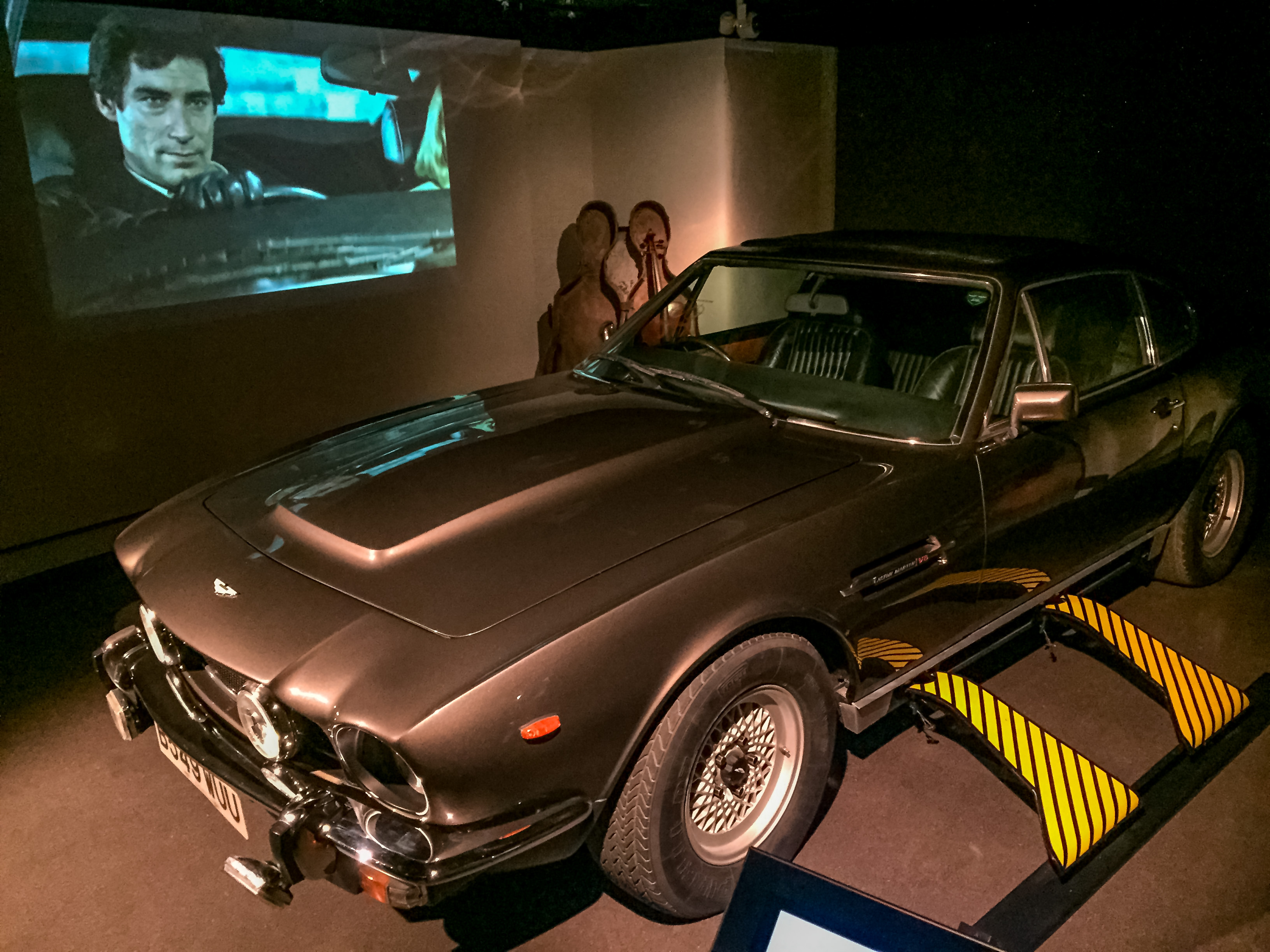
Aston Martin V8 Vantage from The Living Daylights

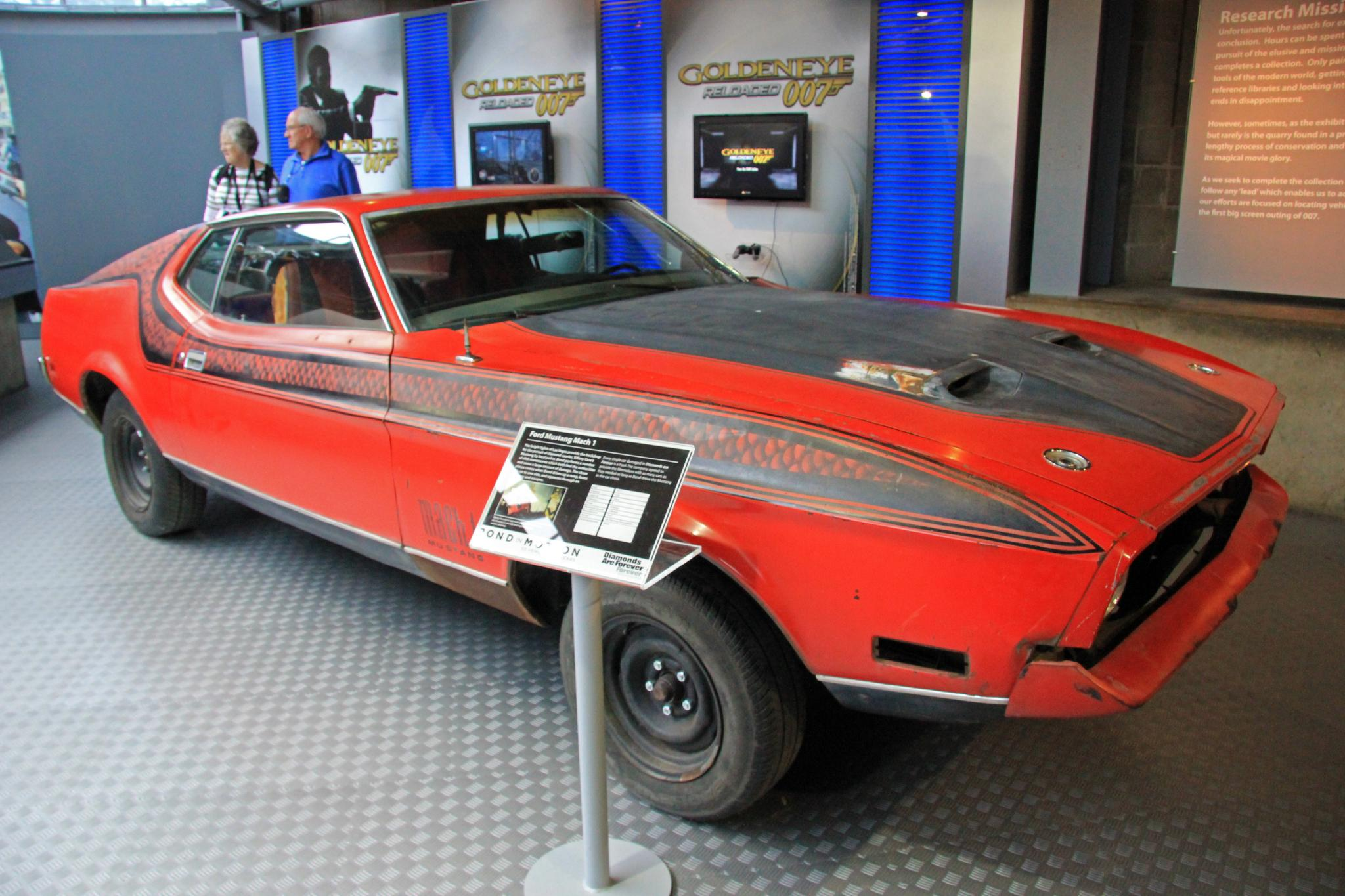
Ford Mustang from Diamonds Are Forever

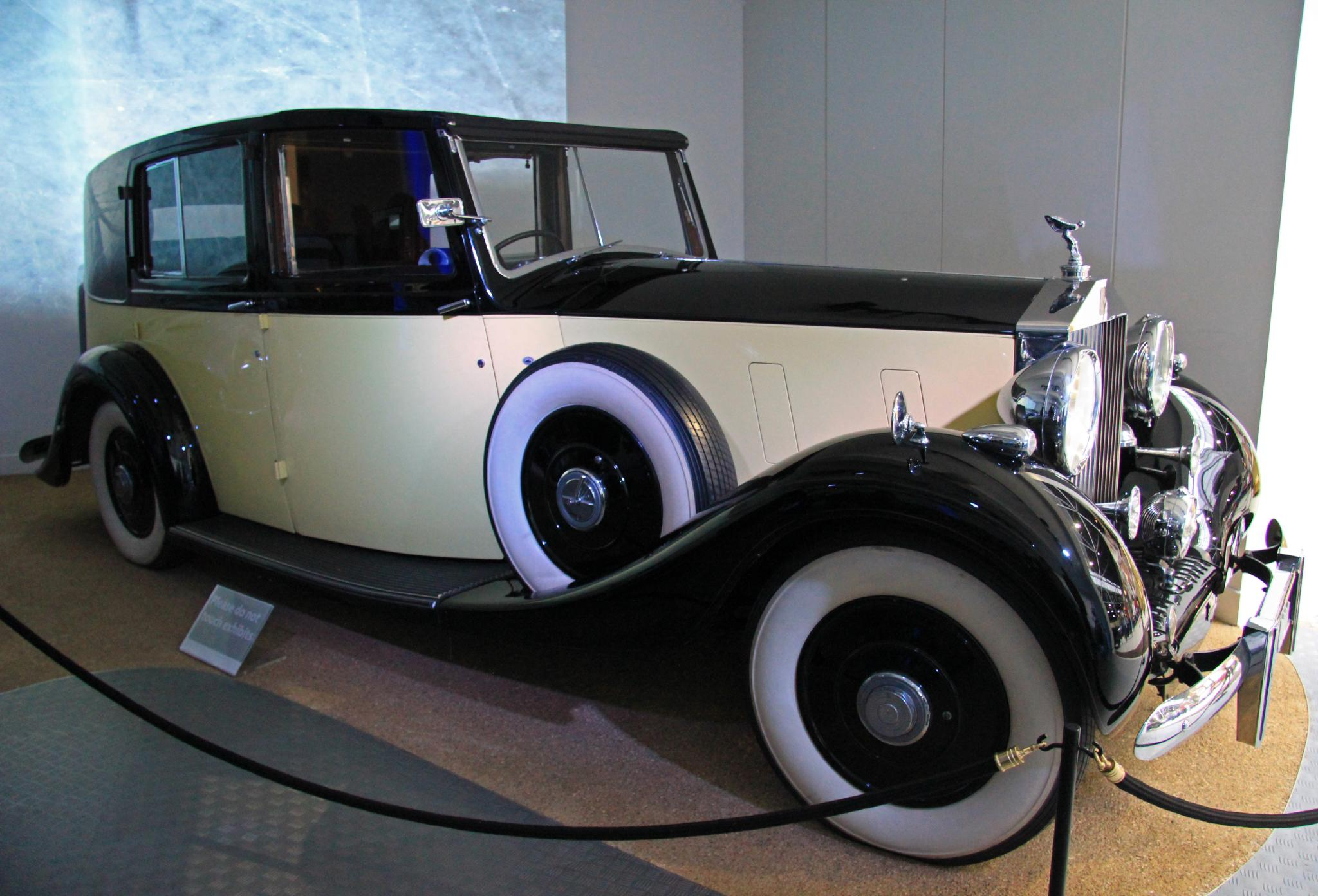
Rolls-Royce Phantom III from Goldfinger

=== Other road vehicles ===
Film	Vehicle	Owner	Notes
Live and Let Die	AEC Regent RT-type double-decker bus	Stolen by James Bond and Solitaire	Used to escape from San Monique's police force. The upper deck of this bus got torn off after Bond drove under a low bridge; the removed upper deck unintentionally came in useful, as a police car crashed into it and then drove into a lake
Thunderball	BSA Lightning motorcycle		
The Spy Who Loved Me	Kawasaki Z900	Stromberg henchman	
For Your Eyes Only	Yamaha XT 500	Erich Kriegler	
Never Say Never Again	Yamaha XJ650 Turbo Seca motorcycle	MI6	Sent to Bond by Q. The XJ650 is Yamaha's only turbo-charged motorcycle.
A View to a Kill	American LaFrance ladder truck	San Francisco Fire Department	
Licence to Kill	Kenworth W900B	Franz Sanchez	
Tomorrow Never Dies	BMW R1200C motorcycle	Stolen by James Bond and Wai Lin	Handcuffed James Bond and Wai Lin escape through the city and jump over a flying helicopter using this motorcycle.
Casino Royale	International 4900	Carlos Nikolic	Serving as a Miami International Airport fuel truck, it is stolen by Carlos Nikolic during an attempted bombing of the brand new Skyfleet S570 prototype.
Skyfall	Honda CRF 250L motorcycle		
Spectre	International 4700	SPECTRE	Used to capture Bond and bring him to Blofeld after setting up a trap to capture him in London.
No Time to Die	Triumph Tiger 900 motorcycle	Agents led by Spectre and Safin	Spectre assassins use Triumph Tiger 900 bikes to chase down Bond at Matera. Several Tiger 900 bikes are also used by Safin's henchmen when they chase down Bond, Madeleine, and Mathilde in Norway.
No Time to Die	Triumph Scrambler 1200	Assassins led by Spectre and Safin	Spectre assassins including Primo use Triumph Scrambler bikes to chase down Bond at Matera. Bond is able to steal one from Primo and uses it to go back to the hotel to get Madeleine and escape Matera. Safin's mercenaries also use Scrambler 1200 bikes to chase down Bond, Madeleine, and Mathilde in Norway.
No Time to Die	Royal Alloy GT150	Nomi	Nomi drives a Royal Alloy scooter in Jamaica

=== Miscellaneous land vehicles ===
Film	Vehicle	Owner	Notes
Diamonds Are Forever	Moon buggy	Whyte Industries	Bond steals a buggy with a VW Beetle chassis and drives it through the Nevada terrain, throwing off the cars chasing him.
Diamonds Are Forever	Honda ATC-90 all-terrain vehicle	Whyte Industries	Seen chasing the commandeered moon buggy. Another ATV is later stolen by Bond.
For Your Eyes Only	GP Beach Buggy	Emile Locque	Locque drives this buggy along a beach in Italy and hits Countess Lisl von Schlaf, leaving her dead.
Casino Royale	New Holland tractor	Stolen by James Bond	James Bond steals a New Holland front-end loader at a construction site whilst chasing Mollaka in Madagascar.

=== Military land vehicles ===
Film	Vehicle	Owner	Notes
Dr. No	Dragon Tank	Dr. No	Used by Dr. No to scare away visitors to Crab Key.
Goldfinger	Dodge M43 Military Ambulance	Auric Goldfinger	Military ambulance hiding a laser to cut through the doors of Fort Knox.
Octopussy	Willys MB	Kamal Khan	Used by Kamal Khan's men to get rid of the dead bodies. However, one of the bodies turns out to be Bond who is hiding.
The Living Daylights	Land Rover Series III	British SAS	Crashes off the Rock of Gibraltar and explodes in the pre-credits sequence.
The Living Daylights	Land Rover 90 Lightweight	Red Army	Used by Bond and Milovy in their escape from the C-130 Hercules shortly before it crashes.
The Living Daylights	Panhard AML Armoured Scout Car	Soviet Air Force	Mocked up as a Soviet reconnaissance car.
The Living Daylights	VAB Armoured Fighting Vehicle	Colonel Feyador	
Licence to Kill	Willys M38 Utility Jeep	Franz Sanchez	
Licence to Kill	M5A1 Stuart Tank	Isthmus's Army	Used by Franz Sanchez and his men to attack the Chinese hideout where Bond is held captive.
GoldenEye	T-55M5 Tank	Russian Reserve Army, Leningrad Military District	Commandeered by James Bond to chase the villain through the city.
The World Is Not Enough	Parahawk	Russian Anti-Terror Unit	Hybrid paraglider/snowmobile vehicles, used by the villain's henchmen to attack Bond and Elektra King while the two are skiing in the Caucasus Mountains.
Quantum of Solace	Land Rover 110 Station Wagon	Colonel Carlos, the Chief of Police in Bolivia	Used by Colonel Carlos until he is shot by Bond through the windscreen of the car.

=== Trains ===
Film	Vehicle	Owner	Notes
From Russia with Love	Orient Express (Istanbul – Venice)	TCDD/SNCF	
You Only Live Twice	Tanaka's underground train in Tokyo	Tiger Tanaka	
You Only Live Twice	monorail in SPECTRE's volcano base	SPECTRE	
On Her Majesty's Secret Service	BOB ABDeh 4/4 (Interlaken – Zweilütschinen – Lauterbrunnen)	BOB	
Live and Let Die	Underground monorail on San Monique (fictional)	Kananga	
Live and Let Die	Silver Meteor with diesel locomotive from New York to Miami	Amtrak	
The Spy Who Loved Me	Unknown Passenger Train on Sardinia	Ferrovie dello Stato	
Octopussy	Steam locomotive 62 015 at Octopussy's Circus Train	DR/Octopussy	filmed at the Nene Valley Railway.
A View to a Kill	Mine railway	Max Zorin	Mine exterior shots filmed at Amberley Museum.
The Living Daylights	Tram	Bratislava Transport	Filmed at Wiener Linien
GoldenEye	Armoured ICBM Train (intercontinental ballistic missile) – modified British Rail Class 20	Alec Trevelyan	Sometimes nicknamed "The Haunting Face" due to its appearance, filmed at the Nene Valley Railway.
Casino Royale (2006)	Pendolino CD-serie 680	České Dráhy (CD)	
Skyfall	Work train with diesel locomotive type DE xx000	TCDD	Second time Bond 'uses' a Turkish train. Filmed in Adana, Turkey.
Skyfall	London Underground 1996 Stock	London Underground	Bond uses the London Underground District Line to chase Silva from Temple Station to Embankment (96069). Later on, Silva blows up a section of the tunnel causing another tube to crash into a subterranean space. While the train is shown to be the District Line in the film, the 1996 Stock never actually served the line and filming took place at Charing Cross, a disused Jubilee Line station.
Spectre	Oriental Desert Express with locomotive ONCF-series DH 370 (EMD GT26CW-2)	Office National des Chemins de Fer du Maroc (ONCF)	Oriental Desert Express that runs from Oujda to Bouarfa in Morocco.
No Time to Die	Frecciarossa 1000	Trenitalia	An Italian high-speed train is shown picking up Madeleine after Bond drops her off at the Sapri railway station in Matera, believing that she betrayed him.

=== Aircraft ===
Vehicle	Owner	Notes
Dr. No (1962)
Boeing 707 Jetliner	Pan Am	Bond takes this plane from London to Kingston. It survives the film, intact. The footage of the plane landing was taken from a Pan Am promotional film and was shot at the Seattle–Tacoma International Airport, with the main terminal clearly visible in the background. The real life identity of this airframe is unknown. Though the British de Haviland Comet was the first civil jetliner in history, it was a commercial failure. The Boeing 707 was the world's first commercially successful jet airliner - and is, thus, responsible for the popularity of jet air travel more than any other aircraft. In 1962, however, this kind of air travel was very expensive and only the rich or those with corporate expense accounts could afford it. They were known as the "jet-set'". As such, "Dr. No" is often considered to be the first "jet-setter" film - which would have been considered quite glamorous at the time.
From Russia with Love (1963)
Boeing 707-321B Jetliner	Pan Am	Bond takes this plane from London to Istanbul. It survives the film, intact. In real life, this airframe was "Jet Clipper Endeavor," serial number 18337, registered as N762PA. The plane was scrapped sometime in the 1980s.
Hiller UH -12C Raven Helicopter	SPECTRE	This light helicopter delivers Rosa Klebb to the SPECTRE Island training base. It later attacks Bond's commandeered truck on a mountain road along the Dalmatian Coast. Clearly inspired by the crop-duster scene in Hitchcock's "North by Northwest", Bond dismounts the truck on foot and the chopper swoops down to make several ramming passes at him. It is destroyed when Bond uses his folding sniper rifle to shoot the co-pilot, just as he is about to throw a grenade. This causes the crewman to drop his grenade in the cabin - which, in turn, blows the aircraft out of the sky. A scale model on a miniature set is used for the destruction scene. In real life, this airframe was serial WH6003 (N780ND). Now owned by the Ian Fleming Foundation.
Goldfinger (1964)
Lockheed L-1329 JetStar Business Jet	Auric Goldfinger	Flown by Pussy Galore, a captive Bond is transported aboard this, Goldfinger's private business jet, from Geneva Airport in Switzerland to Blue Grass Airfield in Kentucky, via Friendship International Airport in Baltimore. It survives the film intact. A scale model on a miniature set was used in some scenes. The Lockheed JetStar was the world's first business jet. In real life, this airframe was JetStar 5023, registered at the time as N711Z. In 2021, the Ian Fleming Foundation acquired part of the fuselage and began restoring it.
Lockheed VC-140 JetStar	United States Government	A US military variant of the civil JetStar, used as a V.I.P. transport. This liaison jet is sent by the US president to pick Bond up from Godman Army Airfield at Fort Knox, Kentucky, by the US president for the purpose of transporting 007 to Washington DC, for a congratulatory lunch at the White House - but it has been hijacked by Goldfinger, with Pussy Galore at the controls. During an onboard confrontation between Bond and the villain, a window gets shot out and Goldfinger is sucked out of the plane by rapid decompression. This also disables the JetStar, itself, forcing 007 and Pussy Galore to bail out, just before the aircraft crashes into the Atlantic Ocean. This is the same airframe that was used as Goldfinger's private jet, but it has been re-painted in US government livery. A scale model on a miniature set was used in some scenes.
Hiller UH-12E4	Auric Goldfinger	A four-seat, extended cabin version of the standard Hiller UH-12. Flown by Pussy Galore, this helicopter brings Goldfinger to Fort Knox, along with his atomic bomb. It survives the film. In real life, the airframe is serial number 2070 (G-ASAZ). This helicopter was later owned by Hields Aviation. In 2015 Honor Blackman was given a flight in it, 51 years after the release of the film.
Aviation Traders ATL-98 Carvair Air Ferry	British United Air Ferries	Providing regular car ferry service across the English Channel in the 1960s, this iconic British plane was modified from the 4-engine, propeller driven, Douglas DC-4 airliner (or its military C-54 Skymaster variant). Goldfinger and Oddjob, (along with the villain's Rolls Royce) take this plane from London's Municipal Southend Airport to Geneva Airport in Switzerland, as Bond waits to follow (with his Aston Martin) on the next Carvair flight. It survives the film. In real life, this airframe is serial number 10273 (G-ASDC), a former Douglas C-54A Skymaster, ex-USAAF 42–72168. Crashed in Venetie, Alaska on 28 June 1997 as N103. The wreck remains in situ. 67.021307°N 146.532058°W
Piper PA-28 Cherokee / Piper PA-23-235 Cherokee Pathfinder Light Planes	Pussy Galore, Auric Goldfinger, or the individual pilots who fly them	In common private operation at the time, 4 of these Cherokee light planes, and 1 Cherokee Pathfinder variant are flown by the all-female aviatrix team of Pussy Galore's Flying Circus. They are seen by Bond training in formation flying over Bluegrass Airfield in Kentucky - but they are mainly used in a dawn raid against Fort Knox to disperse what is supposed to be Delta-9 nerve gas in preparation for Goldfinger's "Operation Grand Slam" (but the gas has been switched to an inert substitute). All survive the film intact. During filming of external flying shots the female pilots were actually male pilots in wigs. In real life, these airframes had serial numbers 28-20068 (N6056W), 28-1658 (N5781W), 28-1400 (N7489W), 28-1613 (N7641W), and 28-10264 (N8729W).
Brantly B-2 Light Helicopter	CIA or some private charter service.	In the final scene, one of these relatively rare helicopters (flown by an unnamed pilot) is used by Felix Leiter to search for Bond and Pussy Galore after the JetStar crash. It survives the film intact. Real life identity, unknown.
Douglas C-47 Skytrain Transport Planes	US Air Force	A famous WWII military version of the equally famous, twin engine, propeller driven, DC-3 airliner (still in fairly common service by the early '60s). Two of these are seen parked in the background on Godman Airfield at Fort Knox, as Bond is seen off in the Presidential jet. Both survive the film intact. Real life identities, unknown.
Thunderball (1965)
Avro Vulcan	RAF	Two Vulcans were used for filming, XH506 was used for flying scenes, and XA913 was used for ground-based scenes. Both Vulcans were scrapped in 1968.
Bell Rocket Belt	British Secret Service	
SAR PB-1G (Boeing B-17 Flying Fortress)	CIA	Rescues Bond and Domino from the water at the end of the film. The plane used in the film, 44–83785, was later owned by the Collings Foundation.
Bell 47J Ranger	CIA	Used by Leiter and Bond to search for the submerged Vulcan. The helicopter in the film was serial number 3302 (N1190W). Written off after an accident in December 1977.
Sikorsky HH-52A Seaguard	US Coast Guard	Used to winch Bond from a cave. Serial number 62-069. Sitting at Orange Coast College in Costa Mesa, California.
Boeing C-97 Stratofreighter	US Air Force	Drops parachutists into battle with SPECTRE.
You Only Live Twice (1967)
'Little Nellie'/Wallis WA-116 Agile Series 1 gyroplane	MI6	Little Nellie was flown, in the film, by its builder, Wing Commander Ken Wallis. Following the filming, Ken Wallis toured airshows with the G-ARZB. Trailered behind his Rolls-Royce he put on an entertaining stunt show, usually involving the pursuit and shooting up of a scrap car containing his assistants, posing as villains. 'Little Nellie' was totally destroyed, at just such an airshow, in Newtownards, N. Ireland on June 7, 1986. Ken Wallis walked away unhurt. Now owned by the Shuttleworth Collection.
Bell 47G	SPECTRE	Four unidentified helicopters.
Kawasaki KV-107II	Public Security Intelligence Agency	Serial number 105/4004 (JA9503). Wrecked in August 1967.
Meyers 200	Osato Chemicals and Engineering	The plane in the film was serial number 308 (N2907T). It was later for sale in South Africa.
Brantly B-2	Osato Chemicals and Engineering	Two helicopters were used in the film, both of which were marked OS-7241. (OS is a fictional registration prefix.) The helicopter that flies in and out of the volcano was serial number 445 (G-ASXE). It was later owned by the Västerås Flygmuseum. The helicopter that lands on the office building was serial number 449 (G-ATFH). This aircraft was destroyed in a crash in 1977.
Aérospatiale SE 313 Alouette II	Public Security Intelligence Agency	Bond flies in this to the ninja school. Serial number 1679 (JA-9007). Later registered in Argentina as LV-WHF. Fate unknown.
Lockheed Hercules	Japan Maritime Self-Defense Force	Two planes seen deploying life rafts after the SPECTRE lair is destroyed.
On Her Majesty's Secret Service (1969)
Bell 206	Ernst Stavro Blofeld	After arriving at Lauterbrunnen railway station, Bond takes this helicopter to Piz Gloria. The helicopter used in the film was serial number 8013 (HB-XCF). As with the 204s used in the film, it belonged to Heliswiss. In 1977 it suffered a forced landing and was damaged beyond repair.
Bell 204	Marc-Ange Draco	Draco and his men use three helicopters in their raid on Piz Gloria. The aircraft were serials 3002 (HB-XCG), 3209 (HB-XCQ), and 3211 (LN-ORZ). All belonged to Heliswiss. 3209 crashed in 1978 at Val Medel and was written off. On 7 September 2001, 3211 (as SE-HVM) slipped off a pier and sunk, killing one person. The final helicopter, 3002, was for sale as a parts machine.
Morane-Saulnier MS.760 Paris	Swiss Air Force	During Draco's flight to Piz Gloria, this plane buzzes the three helicopters. In the film, it is marked as J-4117 (J is a fictional registration prefix). The actual plane was serial 69 (HB-PAA). It was later owned by the Musée européen de l'aviation de chasse in Montélimar, France.
Diamonds Are Forever (1971)
Boeing 707	Lufthansa	Bond and Tiffany Case (unknowingly being pursued by Wint and Kidd) fly from Amsterdam to Los Angeles with Peter Franks's corpse in the cargo hold being used to smuggle the diamonds.
Bell 206 JetRanger	Willard Whyte & CIA	Lead fleet of mythical USMC UH-1 and Hughes 500 helicopters used to stage the raid on Blofeld's oil rig base in Baja California
Live and Let Die (1973)
Boeing 747-100	Pan Am	Bond flies from London to New York Kennedy Airport to begin the mission.
Cessna 170A	Bleaker Flying School	Stolen by Bond escaping from Kananga's henchmen in a chase through Bleaker's hangar. Several other similar aircraft are destroyed in the chase.
The Man with the Golden Gun (1974)
Republic RC-3 Seabee	James Bond	
AMC Matador – Flying car	Francisco Scaramanga	
The Spy Who Loved Me (1977)
HH-3A Sea King	Royal Navy	Bond arrives to meet with the British officials in this Royal Navy helicopter. Most likely XV659/PW-05.
Westland Wessex	Royal Navy	This Royal Navy helicopter flies Bond and Anya out to the American submarine Wayne. Most likely XS523/LS-10.
Bell 206	Karl Stromberg	Used by Stromberg's personal pilot Naomi to pursue Bond's Lotus equipped with machine guns on the undercarriage. Bond blows it up using a missile launched from his Lotus.
Moonraker (1979)
Handley Page Jetstream	Jaws	
Bell 206L LongRanger	Drax Corporation	
Moonraker	Drax Corporation	
Lockheed L-188 Electra	Hugo Drax/Drax Air Freight	
Concorde	Air France	Used by Bond to fly to Rio de Janeiro
Rockwell OV-101 – Space Shuttle Enterprise	NASA/United States Space Marine Force	
Boeing 747 – Space Shuttle Carrier	NASA	
For Your Eyes Only (1981)
Bell 206 JetRanger	MI6	The Chaplain said sent by Universal Exports, but owned by Blofeld, as he states when remotely takes over the helicopter, "do not worry about the pilot he was one of my less useful people" Crashed in IFR weather and destroyed in England while flying too low.
PZL Mi-2	General Gogol	
Octopussy (1983)
Bede BD-5J Microjet "Acrostar Jet"	James Bond	Bede BD5J kitbuilt mini-jet. Originally owned and flown by the Budweiser beer company, later crashed following an engine fire. The pilot, Bob Bishop, bailed out and survived unhurt. The folding wing model seen exiting the horse-box was a mock-up.
Beech 18 'Twin Beech' C-45H	Kamal Khan	Villan Khan, and his goon Gobinda, flee with captive Octopussy in Beech 18; Bond gallops to rescue on a horse, leaping to roof of the plane, which he rides aloft, through stunts. Goon comes out to battle him in flight. Bond wins, rescues Octopussy in the final scene.
Aérospatiale SA 365 Dauphin 2	Soviet Union	Transport for General Orlov to Kamal's Palace. General Gogol also uses this helicopter.
Aérospatiale SA 316 Alouette III		Used by James Bond for transport in the town near Kamal's palace.
Hot Air Balloon	MI6 – Q Branch	
A View to a Kill (1985)
Airship Industries Skyship	Max Zorin	Skyship 500 'G-BIHN' which was on a promotional tour after its participation in the opening ceremony of the 1984 Olympic Games.
MBB BO-105	Soviet Union	Chases Bond in Siberia and crashes after Bond fires a flare into it.
Eurocopter AS355 Ecureuil 2	Max Zorin	Transports Stacey Sutton to Zorin's mansion.
The Living Daylights (1987)
Hawker Siddeley Nimrod	RAF	
British Aerospace Harrier T.4	MI6	
Fairchild C-123 Provider	M	
Fairchild C-123 Provider	Gen. Koskov	
Licence to Kill (1989)
Piper PA-18 Super Cub	Isthmus City Airport	Stolen by Pam Bouvier, this plane was used by her to fly to Sanchez's Olympiatec Meditation Institute and later to fly Bond to one of the tankers during the climactic truck chase.
de Havilland Canada DHC-2 Beaver	Franz Sanchez	
Learjet 45	Franz Sanchez	
Eurocopter MH-65 Dolphin	U.S. Coast Guard	Bond and Felix Leiter use this helicopter to track Sanchez
Cessna 185 Skywagon	Franz Sanchez	Bond commandeers this floatplane
Eurocopter AS350 Ecureuil	Franz Sanchez	Sanchez and others fly to the drug factory in this helicopter.
GoldenEye (1995)
Cessna 172 Skyhawk	Jack Wade (on loan from US DEA)	Shot down by surface-to-air missile over Cuba
Boeing 757-200	British Airways	Used by Bond to fly to Saint Petersburg
Eurocopter Tiger	French Navy	
Mikoyan MiG-29	Russian Air Force	
Pilatus PC-6	Russian chemical producers	
Tomorrow Never Dies (1997)
Aero L-39 Albatros	Central Asian terrorists	Equipped with a nuclear torpedo. Bond pilots the Albatros in order to fly the torpedo out of the terrorist base so that it won't be detonated by the on-route cruise missile which was launched by the Royal Navy. Bond utilizes the Albatros's weapons systems in order to facilitate his escape. Bond successfully takes off but he is followed into the air by another pilot (also in an Albatros) who is in pursuit of Bond and a Dog fight ensues which Bond wins.
Eurocopter AS355 Ecureuil 2	Elliot Carver	Carver's henchmen chase Bond and Wai Lin's motorbike through the streets of Saigon
Mikoyan-Gurevich MiG-23	China	One is shot down by Carver's stealth ship
Sikorsky MH-53M Pave Low	U.S. Navy	Delivers a uniformed Bond to U.S. airbase in the South China Sea
Fairchild C-123 Provider	U.S. Navy	Bond performs a HALO jump from this aircraft
The World Is Not Enough (1999)
Buzz-saw Helicopter	King Industries	Custom Eurocopter AS355, equipped with giant saws that dangle from beneath the landing gear. Originally utilized by King Industries to clear interfering forest brush, a pair are later sent to eliminate Bond.
Eurocopter AS365 Dauphin	King Industries	Elektra King's personal transportation
Parahawk	Russia	Fictional hybrid paraglider/snowmobile used by Russians in attempt to kill Elektra King and Bond
CASA C-212 Aviocar	King Industries	Transport for Renard's men and weapons
Die Another Day (2002)
Switchblades – PHASST (Programmable High Altitude Single Soldier Transport)	US Military	The Switchblade is a military glider used for covert troop deployment. Bond and Jinx use them to infiltrate a North Korean air base so they can get on board Graves's An-124.
Boeing 747-400	British Airways	Bond flies back to London whilst on the run after escaping to Hong Kong.
CH-47 Chinook	US Military	Shown parked in a hangar in South Korea. One Chinook deploys Bond and Jinx on switchblades for their mission to infiltrate a North Korean airbase so they can get on Graves's plane.
Antonov An-124 on the outside, Ilyushin Il-76 when they're in the plane	North Korea	This aircraft is used to transport Gustav Graves's equipment and himself out of Iceland. The plane also serves as Graves's command center during the activation of Icarus. The plane is later damaged and destroyed due to it passing the Icarus beam and also Graves being killed by one of the plane's engines along with Icarus itself.
MD Helicopters MD 600	North Korea	Bond and Jinx drop out of the An-124 cargo hold to escape using this helicopter.
MD Helicopters MD 900 Explorer	Unknown	Shown picking up Zao from his clinic in Cuba.
Casino Royale (2006)
Skyfleet S570	Skyfleet	A "prototype" plane featured in Casino Royale, actually a Boeing 747-200 registration G-BDXJ originally used by British Airways. It was refitted with two mockup engines on each inner pylon and external fuel tanks on the outer pylons, somewhat anachronistically resembling a B-52 Stratofortress. This aircraft survives, permanently grounded and repainted plain white, at Dunsfold Aerodrome, England, where all the airfield action was filmed.
Quantum of Solace (2008)
Douglas DC-3	Unnamed Bolivian civilian	Actually, two separate Dakotas were used in the filming. This short sequence demanded the use of two locations, so far apart that it was considered expedient to use two aircraft. Both were stripped back to bare aluminium and made to look identical, for continuity purposes.
SIAI-Marchetti SF.260TP	Bolivian Air Force	Sent by General Medrano to intercept Bond and Camille in their DC-3. However, Bond manages to outmaneuver the SF.260TP and it crashes.
Bell 205	Bolivian Air Force	Also sent by General Medrano to intercept Bond and Camille in their DC-3.
Bombardier Challenger 604	CIA	Private jet used by CIA to meet with Dominic Greene.
Skyfall (2012)
AgustaWestland AW101	Unnamed henchmen	Appears and attacks the Skyfall Manor House in Scotland
AgustaWestland Wildcat	Royal Navy	Three appear over the abandoned city after Bond shows them the radio transmitter he used
Spectre (2015)
MBB Bo 105	Marco Sciarra / Spectre	Marco Sciarra calls in this helicopter as an escape vehicle. Bond subsequently throws Sciarra and the pilot out and flies it himself.
Britten-Norman BN-2 Islander	Unknown (piloted by Bond)	Used to chase Spectre agents. Loses its wings and is piloted along the ground for the last stretch of the chase.
MD Helicopters MD 500	Ernst Stavro Blofeld / SPECTRE	Bond and Madeleine Swann escape Oberhauser's base in this helicopter.
Aérospatiale SA365N2 Dauphin 2	Ernst Stavro Blofeld / SPECTRE	Blofeld's escape helicopter. Bond is able to disable one of its engines with small arms fire, and it crashes on Westminster Bridge.
No Time to Die (2021)
Cessna 185	Nomi, James Bond, Logan Ash	Used by Nomi for their mission in Cuba. Bond later borrows it to escape Cuba after capturing Valdo Obruchev. Later stolen by Logan Ash after betraying both Bond and Felix Leiter, with the latter being killed.
AgustaWestland AW109S Grand	Lyustifer Safin's forces	Used to track Bond, Madeleine and Mathilde as well as capturing Madeleine and Mathilde
C-17 Globemaster	Royal Air Force	Used to transport Bond and Nomi to Safin's base so they can rescue Madeleine and Mathilde and foil Lyustifer Safin's plot.
Unnamed folding glider	MI6	Used and piloted by Nomi to infiltrate Safin's base. The glider can even transform itself into a submersible, with the wings folding in as it dives underwater.
Russian MiGs	Unknown (Presumably Russian Air Force)	Shown intercepting Q's C-17 Globemaster in an attempt to force the plane to leave airspace to avoid an international incident despite Q letting Bond open the silos for a missile strike by the Royal Navy.

=== Marine vehicles ===
Vehicle	Owner	Notes
Dr No (1962)
Motor Patrol Boat	Royal Navy	With a crew of British sailors on this naval patrol boat, Felix Leiter finds Bond and Honey adrift at sea in their escape boat and offers to rescue them – but Bond prefers to be left alone with Honey.
Cabin Cruiser Patrol Boat	Dr. No	A cabin cruiser used as a patrol boat by Dr. No's security force to protect their employer's private island of Crab Key. This boat appears offshore and strafes the beach (where Bond, Honey Ryder and Quarrel are hiding) with machine gunfire.
Cabin Cruiser Water Taxi	Dr. No or Water Taxi Captain	Operated by a fearful Jamaican Captain, this rather unkempt boat provides water taxi service between Kingston, Jamaica, and Crab Key. The main rule for the operation of this boat is that it never makes the trip in daylight – but emergency conditions prompt the persistent passenger, Professor Dent, to ignore this rule at his own peril. It is seen both as a full-sized prop and as a scale model on a miniature set.
Lyman Islander 18 Runabout	Dr. No	Moored to the docks at Dr. No's bauxite mine, this little runabout is commandeered by Bond and used to escape Crab Key with Honey. Seen both as a full-sized prop and as a scale model on a miniature set, it is featured in the final shot of the film.
Motor Longboat	Felix Leiter or rental	This simple motorized dinghy is used by Felix to transport Bond from Kingston Harbor to his rendezvous at sea with Quarrel's boat.
Sailing Dinghies	Quarrel and Honey Ryder	Two such simple sailboats (one belonging to Honey and one belonging to Quarrel) are featured: one to covertly transport Bond and Quarrel onto Crab Key by night and the other to do the same for Honey. Her beached boat is destroyed by machine-gun fire, while Quarrel's (which is normally used for fishing trips) features in several earlier scenes, as well.
Tugboat	Dr. No	This industrial tug escorts the water taxi up to the bauxite mine docks on Crab Key. It is not an actual tug, but is instead represented by a scale model on a miniature set.
Passenger Liner SS Evangeline	Volusia Steamship Co.	A background vessel, prominently visible at Kingston Harbor when Bond meets with Quarrel. Though no name is given in the film, the actual ship's name was Evangeline, which was owned by the Volusia Steamship Co. With her name changed to Yarmouth Castle, this ship was lost at sea, along with 90 souls, in a fire 3 years later. Though such background vessels (not used by any character in the film) would not normally make a list such as this, this one qualifies for its importance to maritime history. New laws of safety at sea were introduced after her loss.
From Russia with Love (1963)
Luxury Yacht Delos	Ernst Stavro Blofeld or SPECTRE	Blofeld (#1) holds a planning meeting with Rosa Klebb (#3) and Kronsteen (#5) aboard this vessel, anchored in Venice Harbor. For the failure of his plan, Kronsteen is later executed at another meeting aboard this same vessel. Originally built by Blohm & Voss in 1955, under the name Wappen Von Hamburg, she was owned and renamed Delos by the Greek Nomikos Line at the time of filming. She was later named MV Aurora under a new owner.
Bosphorus Ferry	Municipality of Istanbul	A public passenger ferry, where Bond and Tatiana Romanova meet while posing as tourists during a sightseeing cruise along the Bosporus.
Fairey Huntress 23 Powerboat	SPECTRE	Three Fairey Huntresses appear in the film, one of which is commandeered by Bond and used as an escape boat for himself and Tatiana Romanova off the Dalmatian Coast. The two SPECTRE Huntresses seen burning in the film were mock-ups. Bond's boat was either hull 61, named Gay Dolphin, or hull 62, Rumble II. The other SPECTRE boat was a long-cabin variant, hull 48, named Liberty.
Fairey Huntsman 28 Powerboat	SPECTRE	Two Fairey Huntsmans were used, one of which was the camera boat. A mock-up was used in the fire scene. The boat seen in the film is hull 34, now named Here and Now. This boat suffered a fire in 2015. The identity of the camera boat is unknown.
Motor Dinghy	Ernst Stavro Blofeld or SPECTRE	Presumably deployed from Blofeld's yacht, this small craft brings Kronsteen to the meeting aboard the larger luxury vessel.
Water Taxi	Water Taxi Driver or Service	A small antique motor vessel that carries Bond and Tatiana on a romantic trip along the canals of Venice, Italy in the final scene of the film.
Venetian Gondolas	Gondolier or Gondolier Service	Though never used by any character in the film, several of these crafts are seen plying the canals as incidental vessels to establish the location of Venice, Italy, both at the beginning of the story, proper (following the opening action and main title sequences) and at the end.
Dinghy	Kerim Bey or British Intelligence	Kerim transports Bond through the ancient underground aqueducts of Istanbul in a small punted dinghy (kept beneath the British Intelligence station), to a chamber beneath the Soviet embassy, where they can observe an enemy meeting room by periscope.
Punt	Bond, Sylvia Trench or rental	Bond and Sylvia relax and prepare to enjoy a picnic lunch in a grounded punting boat alongside a river in a park somewhere in the London area, just before he is called away on his mission by headquarters. Another couple also passes by on the river in a similar punt.
Goldfinger (1964)
This is the rare Bond film with no prominent watercraft used or owned by any significant character – though there are a few incidental boats (being small rowboats or sailboats) seen at the docks where Bond swims ashore to sabotage a Latin American oil storage facility in the pre-credit action sequence and many incidental boats (of various recreational types) seen in the background setting of Miami Beach.
Thunderball (1965)
Specialized Luxury Yacht Disco Volante	Emilio Largo or SPECTRE	With an Italian name that means "Flying Saucer" in English, Disco Volante is a modern, low slung, luxury yacht with a crew of several dozen and many secret features. Having underwater security cameras and an internal mini-sub/bomb storage bay with underwater hull doors, it can separate into two sections. Seen both as a full-sized prop and as a scale model, this vessel plays a key part in Largo's entire plot and escape attempt. The scale model version is destroyed in an explosive crash into a coral islet. Two ships were used in the film as well as a scale model. In scenes where Disco Volante was at anchor, the yacht Natoya was used in filming. Natoya was one of six "Cruisemaster" yachts built in 1947-48 by Defoe Shipbuilding Company. Her original owner was Harold DuCharme of Grosse Pointe. Later, she carried the names Jacqueline B and Our House III. On 29 January 1992. she was scuttled off the coast of Fort Lauderdale and named the Wendy Rossheim Memorial Reef. The second ship was a PT-20 hydrofoil built by Rodriquez Cantieri Navali and originally named Flying Fish. Upon acquisition, she was modified by 3M Shipyard in Miami and given a 15-metre (50 ft), detachable catamaran cocoon. The hydrofoil and cocoon were sold separately after filming, and their ultimate fates are unknown.
Type 12M Rothesay Class Frigate	Royal Navy	Though no name for this ship is given in the film, the hull number (107) identifies her as HMS Rothesay. While deployed to Bahamian waters, this British warship (crewed by actual RN personnel) participated in the filming for 3 days, appearing as one of the 5 military vessels in pursuit of Disco Volante during the climactic naval chase. In this capacity, the ship even fires upon the enemy yacht with her main artillery gun (presumably loaded with blanks). The film's stars, Sean Connery and Claudine Auger were given a tour of the Royal Navy vessel at the time.
Cape Class Patrol Boats USCGC Cape Knox (CG95312) and USCGC Cape Horn (CG95322)	US Coast Guard	This identical pair of actual US Coast Guard patrol boats (crewed by actual Coast Guard personnel) participated in the filming as 2 of the 5 military vessels in pursuit of Disco Volante during the climactic naval chase. Their names are visible on their sterns.
Mark V 40' UTB Utility Boat (CG40590)	US Coast Guard	This actual US Coast Guard utility boat (crewed by actual Coast Guard personnel) participated in the filming as 1 of the 5 military vessels in pursuit of Disco Volante during the climactic naval chase. Generally known as a "Forty" or "Forty Boat" (due to its length in feet), this type of UTB was quite common in USCG service at the time. It can be identified by its hull number.
Mark I 40' UTB Utility Boat (CG40410)	US Coast Guard	This authentic US Coast Guard utility boat is crewed by actual Coast Guard personnel and participated in the filming as 1 of the 5 military vessels in pursuit of Disco Volante during the climactic naval chase. Generally known as a "Forty" or "Forty Boat" (due to its length in feet), this type of UTB was quite common in USCG service at the time. This particular boat, however (with a prone sailor firing a .30 cal machine gun from its bow), looks to have been significantly modified with the removal of its cabin and other changes in its appearance – but the hull number clearly identifies it as part of the Mark I "Forty Boat" series.
28' Chris-Craft Sea Skiff Powerboat	Emilio Largo or SPECTRE	Piloted by the Captain of Disco Volante and crewed by some of the yacht's sailors, this large powerboat picks Domino, Largo, and his entourage up at the Café Martinique Casino, when they leave. It is probably kept at Largo's Palmyra estate.
22' Chris-Craft Sea Skiff Runabout	Water Taxi Service or Café Martinique	Bond arrives at the Café Martinique Casino in this classic runabout, which seems to be operated as a public water taxi or guest service boat by the Casino. Another similar water taxi is seen leaving with a load of tourists just as Bond arrives at the dock.
Buehler Turbocraft Runabout	Domino Derval or Emilio Largo/SPECTRE	As one of the first jet boats to be marketed, this unique runabout either belongs to Domino or has been provided for her use by Largo. It is seen when Bond first meets Domino while snorkel diving off the coast of Nassau and is used by her to take him back to shore. It is also seen anchored nearby when the two have an underwater tryst at Love Beach and is used to transfer Domino onto Disco Volante with a Geiger counter/camera for the final act. She will also lend it to Bond, as it appears in the background when he swims ashore at the Palmyra breakwater, evidently being the vessel that brought him there.
Evinrude Sport-16 Runabout	Paula Caplain, Pinder, British Intelligence or rental	A small, square bowed, outboard runabout that is supplied for Bond's use, possibly by Pinder (the British Intelligence Station Chief in the Bahamas) or Paula Caplain (a field assistant, who also lives there). It is used by Bond and Paula when they first meet Domino Derval while snorkel diving off the Nassau coast, whereupon Bond transfers from the Evinrude with Paula to Domino's boat. It is seen again when Bond and Felix Leiter reconnoiter the anchored Disco Volante by day. Due to a continuity error, this description applies only to the wide exterior shots – while the studio close-ups in front of a rear projection screen show Bond and Leiter in a slightly different, unidentifiable prop boat.
Evinrude Playmate Runabout	Emilio Largo or SPECTRE	A tiny runabout, apparently carried by Disco Volante as a dinghy. It is used by 3 of Largo's men in an attempt to run Bond down while he conducts an underwater reconnaissance of the yacht by night. Hitting something, they believe they have killed him, but have actually only clipped his detached scuba tank with the boat's propeller.
Bomb Sled Submersible	Emilio Largo or SPECTRE	A bright orange, spade-shaped, twin prop submersible with an open 2-man cockpit and a pair of side racks for the underwater carriage of two atomic bombs, designed and built specifically for the film. Stowed in a hangar bay aboard Disco Volante and used by Largo's scuba crew every time the bombs must be transported to or from the yacht, it also features handholds for the external carriage of several more divers (in addition to the 2-man crew), 6 forward-firing spear guns and 2 headlights. As such, it also serves as a kind of underwater tank in battle, until captured by US Navy divers allied with Bond. This craft is also used by Largo and Bond (when disguised as a SPECTRE diver). It is incorrectly referred to by Largo as a "submarine", though it is clearly a "submersible". The difference is that the former is a sealed underwater vessel that stays dry with an oxygenated atmosphere inside, while the latter is an underwater vessel that is open to the sea or fills with water, requiring any crew members to wear scuba gear.
Scuba Sleds	Emilio Largo or SPECTRE	Several small, wedge-shaped, 1-man, motorized aqua-sleds with handlebar controls, for the external carriage of scuba divers, designed and built specifically for the film. Stowed in a hangar bay aboard Disco Volante and frequently used by Largo's scuba crew during underwater operations, they also feature twin, forward-firing spear guns and headlights for combat. During the underwater battle scene, one of this craft is used by Largo and another two (commandeered from the enemy on separate occasions) are used by Bond. Most seem to be abandoned at sea with the defeat of SPECTRE.
Motorized Scuba Rig	Issued to Bond by British Intelligence	A specialized, triple-tanked scuba rig, designed and built specifically for the film, with a small electric motor for self-propulsion. Featuring a forward-firing mini-torpedo launcher and a headlight, it leaves a trail of yellow dye in the water, which is supposed to be some kind of underwater concealment device (similar to a smokescreen) to be deployed against pursuers, but is instead deployed all the time by the Director, just for the look of it. Issued to 007 by Q in Pinder's British Intelligence station and used by Bond during the climactic underwater battle, it is destroyed when he switches to a miniature re-breather and abandons the larger rig in a shipwreck to lure enemy divers close so that he can drop an underwater grenade on them.
Rubber Boat	Pinder or British Intelligence	A paddle-powered, commando-style assault raft (known in military parlance as a "rubber boat"), used by Leiter and Pinder to deploy Bond into the sea by night for his underwater reconnaissance of Disco Volante. Oddly enough, they do not wait around to pick him up and he must make his own way back by hitchhiking.
Rescue Raft	US Navy, US Air Force or C.I.A.	A circular, self-inflating life raft, equipped with the Fulton Surface-To-Air Recovery System (STARS) and dropped to Bond and Domino at sea from a modified B-17 rescue plane. Used by the US Navy, US Air Force, and C.I.A. in the early '60s, this rescue system involved a dirigible-shaped, bottle-inflated, helium balloon that would rise into the air trailing a 150-metre (500 ft) nylon cable with a harness at the bottom end for a rescue subject. The cable would then be caught in a special fork on the nose of the rescue plane and the rescue subject would be whisked into the air in the harness to trail beneath and behind the aircraft, where a crew in the belly of the plane would snatch the cable with hooks, attach it to a winch, and reel the subject into the bomb bay. With Domino clinging tightly to him, Bond uses this system to be plucked from the sea in the final scene of the film.
Catamaran Tropic Rover	Unknown	A giant, two-masted, gaffe rigged catamaran, incidentally anchored near Disco Volante off Nassau. Her name clearly appears on her bow. First seen by Bond and Leiter by day, it is used by them and Pinder that night for concealment as the insertion point for Bond's underwater reconnaissance of the enemy yacht and he is chased back under it by SPECTRE boatmen afterwards, to again use it for concealment in his escape. Within the film, no owner or reason for this vessel to be present (other than coincidence) is given. Owned by Tropic Cruises Ltd, and captained by its designer Syd Hartshorne in real life, the Tropic Rover was known for charter tours around Nassau, had been featured in "Life" magazine, and was the largest catamaran in the world at that time. Two years later in 1967, she ran aground and sank in Nassau Harbor, with no loss of life.
Topsail Schooner	Unknown	A large two-masted topsail schooner is seen prominently in the background when Bond meets Domino off the Nassau coast. It is plying back and forth all through the filming day, suggesting that its presence must have been arranged with the real owner by the filmmakers (rather than by incidental coincidence. "Thunderball" features the most marine vehicles and watercraft of any James Bond film.
You Only Live Twice (1967)
Modernized A Class Overseas Patrol Submarine	Royal Navy	This cold war submarine, operated by RN personnel, appears to be on loan from the Royal Navy to British Intelligence for use by M as a mobile headquarters. Outfitted with an office for the intelligence chief and a reception room for Moneypenny, she bears the fictional pennant number M-1 (probably in reference to the boat's temporary assignment to M). She appears at the beginning of the film (where Bond is secretly taken on board after his falsified funeral at sea, receives his mission briefing, and is deployed ashore to Japan through a torpedo tube), and again at the end (where he and Kissy Suzuki are scooped up in their rescue raft by the surfacing sub). Though no name is given for this vessel in the film, she is the actual HMS Aneas – a streamline modified version of the WWII era A Class diesel/electric boats that served as the backbone of Britain's patrol submarine force in the early 1960s.
Type 12 Whitby Class Frigate	Royal Navy	Though given no name in the film, her pennant number (F65) indicates that this is the actual HMS Tenby (crewed by actual RN personnel). She is the warship on which Bond's false funeral and burial at sea are held in Hong Kong Harbor.
Freighter Ship MV Ning Po	Osato Chemicals, SPECTRE, China, or some complicit shipping company	A commercial freighter ship used by Osato Chemicals for the secret transport of rocket fuel to Blofeld's volcano base. First seen in an enemy photograph stolen from Mr. Osato's safe, the motor vessel and its cargo are investigated by Bond and Aki at the Kobe Docks in Japan, whereupon Bond is captured and taken aboard to the quarters of Helga Brandt. It is seen again in a reconnaissance photo, showing (by its waterline) that the cargo has been offloaded. Ownership of this vessel is unclear, though it seems to be controlled by Mr. Osato of Osato Chemicals on behalf of SPECTRE, and is probably owned by one of them. The name Ning Po, however, suggests that it may be a state-owned Chinese ship since SPECTRE is working for some unidentified Asian country (judging by the two Asian representatives who meet with Blofeld) that wants to instigate a war between the US and the USSR – which would presumably be Red China (or, perhaps, North Korea). The owner may also be some unidentified shipping company that is complicit in the SPECTRE plan, as a preliminary investigation by Tiger Tanaka reveals that the ship has a Panamanian registry (which is common for commercial ships from anywhere, as Panama has lenient maritime regulations). Two ships were used in the film. The ship seen in the photograph is unidentified. The ship Bond visits at the dock is the M.V. Yamaguchi Maru. This vessel was built in 1965 by Mitsubishi. In 1980 she was renamed Brazilian Express, and in 1984 was broken up in China.
Public Shuttle Boat	Local public utility or shuttle service company	A quaint, old-fashioned, Japanese shuttle boat of wood and bamboo construction with a chugging engine sound. Disguised as locals among many other passengers, Bond, Kissy Suzuki and Tiger Tinaka travel to the Ama fishing village aboard this vessel.
Ama Boats	Kissy Suzuki and other villagers	Small, simple, stern-rowed, wooden boats (similar to sampans), used for ama-style pearl diving. Disguised as a husband and wife team in their own such boat, Bond and Kissy Suzuki (with he rowing and she diving) break away from the rest of the pearling fleet in order to investigate a nearby cave. The boat is abandoned there when poison gas is detected, prompting the two occupants to dive overboard.
Life Rafts	SIS or Japanese Defense Forces	Many bright orange inflatable life rafts are air-dropped to Tanaka's ninja force by military transport plane as they make their swimming escape from Blofeld's volcano base. Among this force, Bond and Kissy Suzuki get into their own raft, which drifts apart from the others. Just as the couple starts to get romantic, however, their raft is scooped up on the deck of M's submarine, which surfaces directly beneath them in the final scene of the film.
On Her Majesty's Secret Service (1969)
Rowboat	Unknown – Presumably a local fisherman	Though not used for transport by any character, a small wooden rowboat is seen propped upside-down (in the local dry storage method) on a Portuguese beach in the pre-title action sequence. During a fight against several attackers, Bond throws one of his opponents beneath this boat and kicks out the prop stake to trap the man under its hull.
Diamonds Are Forever (1971)
Mountbatten Class SR.N4 Hovercraft Ferry Princess Margaret	Seaspeed ferry service	Hovercraft are difficult vehicles to classify as they fly at an altitude of a few centimetres on a cushion of air over flat land or water – qualifying them as water, land, or air craft, simultaneously. The one in this film is shown traveling down a concrete land ramp and across the English Channel. It is the BHC (British Hovercraft Corporation), formerly Saro (Saunders-Roe) SR.N4 (Saunders Roe.Nautical 4), Princess Margaret which, together with her sister craft, Princess Anne, offered ferry service from Dover, England to Boulogne-sur-Mer and Calais, France, operated by Seaspeed from 1968 to 1981 (and thence by Hoverspeed until 2000). Her name is visible on her bow, as is the Seaspeed logo. Driving a commandeered car, Bond takes this ferry from Britain to mainland Europe at the beginning of his mission to Amsterdam. In real life, the Princess Margaret could accommodate 254 passengers and 30 cars, until modified in 1972 to carry more. The Mountbatten Class is the largest hovercraft of its time and still holds the record for the fastest car ferrying trip across the English Channel. Being vulnerable to high winds, she was blown aground in a 1981 accident with the loss of 4 passengers. She was later on display at the Hovercraft Museum in Hampshire, England.
Ballistic Missile Submarine	Soviet Navy	A submerged Soviet nuclear-powered ballistic missile submarine that is destroyed while underway by Blofeld's laser satellite. This is not a full-sized vessel, but is instead a scale model on an aquarium set. Though marked with a red star and clearly intended to represent a Soviet submarine, the model more closely resembles a US Benjamin Franklin Class.
Canberra Class Ocean Liner	Unknown Shipping Company, possibly belonging to Willard Whyte	A steam-powered, turbo-electric ocean liner on which Bond and Tiffany Case travel back to England from the United States and aboard which Mr. Wint and Mr. Kid make their final attack on Bond. Though the point of departure for this voyage is not specified in the film, it would presumably be New York, as in the book. No owner is mentioned, but the billionaire/industrialist Willard Whyte claims that he can order the captain around, which suggests that he might be the owner of the vessel or the shipping line. Though no name is given in the film, this is the actual SS Canberra, a British ocean liner, owned by P&O Shipping Lines which ran from England to Australia between 1961 and 1974, at which time she was converted into a cruise ship until scrapped in 1997. She was also pressed into service as a troop transport for the 1982 Falklands War between the United Kingdom and Argentina.
Canal Excursion Boat Prins Willem Alexander	Reederij P. Kooij Canal Tours	A Dutch-style, motorized canal excursion boat with a glass top. To establish the Amsterdam location, this boat is shown on a sight-seeing cruise of the Amstel River. Its female tour guide is heard to express shock as she passes a crime scene where the body of Mrs. Whistler is being recovered from the water. The name of this real vessel can be seen on the bow and its company of ownership is printed on the windshield.
Dutch Canal Boat Jan Van der Hiede	Unknown	A Dutch-style canal boat that has become part of a crime scene along the Amstel River in Amsterdam, Netherlands. Though apparently an ordinary civilian vessel (rather than a police boat), it has been either commandeered or simply boarded by the Amsterdam police and used as a platform to recover Mrs. Whistler's body from the water. Its name is visible on the hull.
Bathosub	Ernst Stavro Blofeld	A fictitious, wedge-shaped, one-man mini-sub, designed specifically for the film. Kept on Blofeld's offshore oil rig/satellite control base, it is intended for the villain's personal use as an emergency escape vehicle – though when he tries to use it as such in the climactic battle scene, Bond gains control of the bathosub's launching crane and uses the mini-sub as a wrecking ball with Blofeld inside. Here, the long-standing Bond nemesis is presumably killed in this vessel, but his death is left somewhat ambiguous. Probably a non-working prop (as it never gets free from its crane hook and is, thus, never shown to operate in the water as a submarine), the bathosub seems to be misnamed, as the word does not apply to any real world type of vehicle. The closest actual word would be "bathyscaph", which is an entirely different type of underwater vehicle, intended only to go up or down to great depths, with limited lateral movement.
Wave Walker	British Intelligence, CIA or Willard Whyte	A spherical (slightly polygonal) watertight flotation device in which a single person can stand or walk on the surface of the water. The walking action turns the sphere (much like a hamster wheel), imparting directional motion to it across the water. Normally a leisure device, the one in the film is specially equipped with a triple parachute (in the fashion of a space capsule). Within it, Bond is air dropped into the Baja Sea near Blofeld's offshore oil rig /satellite control base, whereupon he water-walks to the platform. It is apparently issued to Bond for this purpose by British Intelligence or the CIA (with whom he is working closely), or perhaps by the billionaire aerospace industrialist, Willard White, who owns all manner of high-tech equipment (and with whom Bond is also working closely).
Live and Let Die (1973)
LST Assault Ship/	Unknown	An old, rusty WWII era LST (Landing Ship, Tank) that has been converted to industrial purposes. It is moored along a river in the Irish Bayou of Louisiana during the boat chase sequence. By ramming attack with his own commandeered boat, Bond deflects Adam's out-of-control speedboat into the open bow ramp of the LST, causing the enemy boat to crash and explode inside the assault ship (presumably killing Adam in the process).
Dredge Barge	Unknown	An old, rusty dredging barge, loaded with painting equipment. It is moored alongside an LST assault ship on a river in the Irish Bayou of Louisiana during the boat chase sequence. In his own commandeered boat, Bond hides behind this barge, from which he grabs a bucket of paint thinner to throw into Adam's eyes in order to blind the pursuing henchman and send his speedboat out of control.
Cabin Cruiser	Quarrel Jr. or British Intelligence	A rather unkempt cabin cruiser operated by Bond's field assistant, Quarrel Jr. in keeping with his cover identity as a deep-sea fishing guide. It is first seen at a tourist trap dock on the fictional island of San Monique, where Bond and Rosie Carver first meet Quarrel Jr. and pretend to hire him and his boat for a charter fishing trip, whereupon it takes them up the coast to reconnoiter Solitaire's cliff-top mansion and drops the couple off at another dock, nearby. The same boat later tows Bond into the air on a hang glider to infiltrate the mansion grounds. Quarrel Jr. picks Bond and Solitaire up with this boat as they arrive by stolen double-deck bus (under police pursuit) to escape San Monique from the same dock by which they arrived. It is again seen at the climax of the story as the scuba diving platform from which Felix Leiter drops Bond and Quarrel Jr. off on their infiltration of Kananga's secret lair and for the recovery of Quarrel Jr, afterward. Several similar cabin cruisers (in much better maintenance condition) are also seen at the tourist trap dock, where other fishing guides (who seem far more enterprising than Quarrel Jr.) unsuccessfully bid for Bond's charter business.
Glastron GT-150 Speedboat	Dr. Kananga	A small outboard speedboat, stolen by Bond from Dr. Kananga's crocodile farm/drug lab and piloted by him at the beginning of the boat chase through the Irish Bayou in Louisiana. It is this boat (modified for ramp stability with two hull rails on the underside and the pilot's seat moved to the center-line) that makes the record-breaking 37-metre (120 ft) jump over Sheriff Pepper's police car on a causeway road. When its engine takes a bullet hit, Bond must abandon the GT-150 for another boat.
Glastron CV-19 Jet Speedboat	Deke Rodgers	A small hydro-jet powered speedboat. Moored at Deke Rodger's house along the Irish Bayou, Bond transfers to this boat, which he steals after his original GT-150 is disabled by gunfire, then completes the remainder of the boat chase in it. The CV-19 survives the chase and is presumably returned to Rodgers after Bond relinquishes it at a Louisiana marina, where Felix Leiter is waiting with a police entourage.
Glastron-Carlson CV-21 Jet Speedboat	Billy-Bob	A souped-up hydro-jet powered speedboat, stolen from a park ranger, Billy-Bob from a Louisiana Parks and Wildlife station by Kananga henchman Adam, who uses it to pursue Bond in the boat chase sequence. Among the many craft involved in the chase, it is the last one destroyed, when Bond blinds Adam with paint thinner, sending it out of control. By ramming attack with his own commandeered boat, Bond deflects Adam's out-of-control speedboat into the open bow ramp of an LST, causing the enemy boat to crash and explode inside the assault ship (presumably killing Adam in the process).
Glastron V-162 Futura Speedboat	Kananga henchman	A small outboard speedboat, which is one of many that pursue Bond in the boat chase through the Irish Bayou of Louisiana. While trying to follow Bond's stolen boat through a record-breaking jump over a causeway road, this boat is destroyed when it falls short and spears through Sheriff J.W. Pepper's car.
Glastron V-184 Crestflite Jet Speedboat	Kananga henchmen	A small hydro-jet powered speedboat, which is one of many that pursue Bond in the boat chase through the Irish Bayou of Louisiana. While trying to follow Bond's boat across a lawn between bends of a river, this boat plows overland through an outdoor wedding ceremony. It crashes through the wedding cake table, before ending up stuck in a cabana tent.
Glastron V-145 Fireflite Speedboat	Dr. Kananga henchmen	A small outboard speedboat, which is one of the many that pursue Bond in the boat chase through the Irish Bayou of Louisiana. While trying to follow Bond's boat across a lawn between bends of a river, this boat ends up in the swimming pool of Deke Rodger's elegant estate.
Glastron V-156 Sportster Speedboat	Kananga Henchmen	Two of these small outboard speedboats pursue Bond in the boat chase through the Irish Bayou of Louisiana. One is disabled after crashing into a tree, the other is simply outrun by Bond (along with Kananga henchman, Adam, who remains in the chase).
Johnboat	Unknown (presumably policemen)	Two of these small crafts play an active part in the police blockade at Miller's Bridge along the Irish Bayou of Louisiana, during the boat chase sequence. One is plowed through by Bond in his commandeered speedboat and the other is plowed through by Adam in his stolen speedboat. Many other small boats are present at the blockade as incidental craft, but no others are directly involved in the action.
The Man with the Golden Gun (1974)
Ocean Liner RMS Queen Elizabeth	presumably British Intelligence	A wrecked and partially sunken ocean liner in Hong Kong Harbor, which is being used as a secret base (with a refurbished interior) by British Intelligence. As identified in the film dialogue, this is the actual RMS Queen Elizabeth, the largest passenger ship in the world at that time. Originally owned by Cunard Shipping Lines, she served as a British troopship in WWII and then ran a commercial trans-Atlantic route between Southampton, UK and New York City, United States from 1946 to 1969. It was used for cruises from New York to the Caribbean, before being sold to the Hong Kong-based Orient Overseas Line for conversion to a university cruise ship that was to be called Seawise University. While being refitted for that purpose in 1972, however, the ship caught fire, partially capsized, and sank in Hong Kong Harbor, where she appears in the film. Eventually, she was declared a shipping hazard and partially scrapped. What remains still lies buried on the harbor floor.
Chinese Junk	Francisco Scaramanga	A traditional, 3 masted, Chinese junk, modified with motorized propulsion and a modern luxury interior, to serve as Francisco Scaramanga's personal yacht. It is seen off the coast of Hong Kong, Bangkok, and Scaramanga's private island, where it is used for transport, as a reconnaissance platform to observe Bond's hotel, a safe storage vault for the solex agitator, and for bedroom trysts between the villain and his mistress. In the end, it is commandeered by Bond and Mary Goodnight for their escape from Scaramanga's island, where it is the scene of a final fight between Bond and Nick Nack. Though given no name in the film, this vessel is the actual June Hong Chain Lee, a Malaysian Junk, built in 1962 and originally used as a merchant cargo vessel, but now owned by The Junk Worldwide Dive and Sail of Phuket, Thailand, for charter scuba diving excursions. It is the only operational junk of its vintage type left in the world.
Hydrofoil Ferry Flying Sandpiper	Hong Kong Macao Hydrofoil Co.	A medium-sized hydrofoil ferry configured for passenger service. Built by Rodriquez Cantieri Navali and operated by Hong Kong Macao Hydrofoil Co. since 1972 for ferry service between those two islands. Bond follows Andrea Anders from Macao to Hong Kong aboard this ferry. Its name is clearly visible along the side of the superstructure.
Hong Kong Police Boat No. 20	Hong Kong Marine Police	A smallish (maybe 7.0-metre (23 ft)) cabin cruiser-type police patrol boat with flashing blue lights and the designation "No. 20" clearly visible on its stern. Seeming to be an enemy, Lieutenant Hip transports Bond (while under false arrest) across Hong Kong Harbor, when Bond "escapes" by jumping off onto the sunken hulk of RMS Queen Elizabeth. As it turns out, no escape was necessary as Hip turns out to be an ally who was transporting Bond to the ocean liner hulk all along.
Klong Tour Boat	Unknown Tour Company	Several identical teakwood, canopied, open tour boats with a 20 to 30 passenger seating capacity (presumably all belonging to the same tour company) can be seen operating along the klongs of the floating market in Bangkok, Thailand. Though mostly incidental, three of these vessels play a direct role in the boat chase action, with one pulling out of a slip to cut off the chase boat, one containing a little street urchin boy who jumps off and swims to Bond's boat and one containing Sheriff J.W. Pepper and his wife May Bell as the passing chase boats splash water on them.
Longtail Longboat	Hai Fat, Hai Fat's Kung-Fu School or one of the kung-fu students	A long, canoe-like, six-man, longtail motorboat (being a type of Thai motorboat powered by an outboard car engine on a stern tiller mount, turning a screw at the end of a long boom axle). Moored on a Klong in front of Hai Fat's Kung Fu School, six kung-fu students jump into this boat and give chase after Bond, upon his escape from the school in another longtail. A ramming attack from Bond's boat cuts it in half and dumps the students into the drink.
Longtail Skiff	Unknown	A short, one-man, longtail motorboat (being a type of Thai motorboat powered by an outboard car engine on a stern tiller mount, turning a screw at the end of a long boom axle). Moored on a Klong in front of Hai Fat's Kung Fu School, Bond steals this boat to escape from the school, whereupon he is taken under pursuit by six kung-fu students in another longtail. After foiling his pursuers by ramming their boat and cutting it in half, Bond makes good his leisurely escape and presumably abandons his stolen craft, intact, when finished with it. Due to the torque of their big car engines, these boats are easy to turn in one direction, but hard to turn in the opposite direction (when they often over-steer). Because of this issue, Roger Moore managed to capsize his longtail and dump himself into the filthy Klong water during filming.
Rowboat	Unidentified Rower	A small, simple, open, wood boat, propelled by oars. This little craft, rowed by an unidentified character, drops the mob assassin, Rodney, off at Scaramanga's island in the pre-title action sequence.
Sampan	Unidentified Thai Woman	A simple, wedge-shaped, flat bottomed, wood boat, common to Southeast Asia and powered by a paddle or punting pole. At the end of the boat chase scene, Sheriff J. W. Pepper looks on from a dock as a tourist. Just as he recognizes Bond, he is knocked by a baby elephant into the Klong between two of these sampan boats – one of which is occupied by a Thai woman, who giggles at the Sheriff's undignified predicament. Several similar craft are seen as incidental props all along the Klongs.
Casino de Macau Floating Casino	Sociedade de Turismo e Diversoes de Macau	Though more of a building built on a stationary barge than a true watercraft, the floating Casino de Macau casino is featured in the background when Bond arrives at Lazar's gun shop in Macau. Later, he enters the presumably same casino while following the trail of a bullet shipment which is passed from Lazar to Andrea at the gaming tables. At the time of filming, the casino was moored along Rua Das Lorchas between Ponte 12 & 14. At some point, its name was changed to Macau Palace Casino, and the building was rebuilt or renovated to a different appearance. This new version has been towed to the inner harbor of Macau, where it has been out of business for some time. Though no owner of this establishment is mentioned in the film, all Macau casinos at that time were owned by a monopoly called Sociedade de Turismo e Diversoes de Macau.
The Spy Who Loved Me (1977)
Specialized Lotus Esprit S1 Sportscar/Submarine "Wet Nellie"	British Intelligence	A modified Lotus Esprit S1 sports car that converts into a mini-submarine. During transformation, the wheels retract and the wheel wells are covered over by fairings, fins sprout from the fairings and the dashboard instruments change to a nautical instrument panel (all activated by a lever on the floor). It features tubes behind the rear license plate that spray liquid cement on land and squid-like ink in water (activated by a dashboard switch), an anti-aircraft mini-missile launcher in the rear window (activated by a stickshift button with a targeting monitor on the center console), a mini-torpedo launcher in the hood (activated by a steering wheel button), a mine dispenser in the bottom (activated by a dashboard switch) and a periscope in the roof (which displays its image on a viewscreen near the rear-view mirror). Developed by MI-6, this car/sub is issued to Bond by Q at a ferry dock in Sardinia and piloted by him (with Anya Amisova as a passenger) in a road car chase and an underwater mini-sub/scuba battle, after which it is piloted out of the sea before an astonished beach crowd. In real life, there were 6 versions of the Lotus used in filming (most of which were normal cars, one of which was modified for the transformation scene, one of which was watertight to emerge from the sea on a cable-tow, and one of which was a submersible only). There was also a scale model version for use on a miniature aquarium set in conjunction with a scale model of Stromberg's underwater laboratory. The submersible (or wet-sub) was not watertight or pressurized, but filled with water and was operated by two scuba divers – requiring heavily louvered windows to hide the scuba-suited occupants. It featured four fins, two rudders, and four electric motors that could only run forward. Though never mentioned in film dialogue, the submersible version was nicknamed "Wet Nellie" by the film crew (after the "Little Nellie" gyroplane in "You Only Live Twice". After filming and a promotional tour, it was put into storage for ten years, until the entire contents of the storage locker were bought at auction, sight unseen, for $100. In 2013, this buyer sold it at auction for 616,000 pounds to Elon Musk.
Arctic Wetbike	British Intelligence	An early personal watercraft given to Bond by Q to access Stromberg's fortress.
Specialized Oil Supertanker MT Liparus	Stromberg Shipping Lines	A gigantic oil supertanker (said to be the largest in the western world), which is actually a secret mobile submarine base. It features an advanced underwater tracking system (for tracking submarines), a magnetic field generator (for disabling submarines), clamshell bow doors (for capturing or launching submarines), and an internal submarine bay (capable of accommodating 3 submarines). It also features armories, missile storage facilities, a mission control room, 3 detention brigs, and a monorail transport system. All this is in addition to the normal ship features (such as bridge, crew quarters and engine rooms), which it presumably has, as well. Owned by Karl Stromberg and operated by an armed crew of hundreds, under the command of an unnamed Captain, this ship serves as the operational base for the villain's plot, and is the primary scene of the film's climax. The plot involves capturing nuclear submarines, imprisoning their crews, and using their nuclear missiles to provoke WWIII between the US and USSR, in order to destroy the corrupt surface civilization of Earth, so that a new Utopian civilization can be built under the sea. In the end, it is overtaken in battle by the captive allied submarine crews (freed by Bond) and is eventually sunk with all hands, due to damage sustained in this battle. Externally, Liparus is not a real ship, but is represented by a scale model – though, at 24 metres (80 ft) in length, it is a very large scale model, powered by an outboard motorboat engine. Its internal spaces are built on the massive 007 sound-stage at Pinewood Studios, and the submarine bay is the largest interior set ever built in the history of motion pictures (surpassing the previous record, which had been held by the volcano base in You Only Live Twice.
Specialized Monorail Car/Motorboat	Stromberg Shipping Lines	A monorail car of the Liparus's internal transportation system that, when launched out of a hatch in the side of the supertanker, discards its car shell exterior and transforms into a motorboat. A Liparus guard pilots Karl Stromberg (with Anya Amisova as a prisoner) from the supertanker at sea to the Atlantis laboratory. It is seen both as a full-sized prop and as a model on a miniature set.
Intermarine Cigarette 37	Stromberg Shipping Lines	A powerboat that transports James Bond and Anya Amasova from the Hotel Cala di Volpe to the Atlantis base of Karl Stromberg.
Nuclear Ballistic Missile Submarine HMS Ranger	Royal Navy	A fictional ballistic missile submarine of the nuclear powered Resolution Class. The four real life members of the Resolution Class (Resolution, Repulse, Renown, and Revenge) were part of the UK Polaris Programme, which served as the British Navy's main nuclear deterrent force from 1968 to 1996. They carry 16 UGM-27 Polaris A-3 SLBM missiles and feature 6 Tigerfish torpedo tubes. In the film, HMS Ranger, captained by Commander Talbot, is seen in the opening action sequence, where she is lost under mysterious circumstances. As such, the rest of the plot revolves around Agent 007's search for this missing submarine (together with Soviet Agent XXX's search for a missing Soviet sub). She appears again as a captive submarine, rechristened Stromberg 2 (though external shots seem to show her as Stromberg 1) aboard the supertanker Liparus, where she is re-crewed with Stromberg sailors and deployed at sea to launch a nuclear missile at Moscow in the film's climax. This is part of a plan intended to provoke WWIII between the United States and The Soviet Union, in order to wipe out all surface civilization, so that a Utopian civilization beneath the sea can be built anew by the super-villain, Karl Stromberg. She is destroyed by a nuclear warhead, when Bond tricks the Captains of Stromberg 1 and Stromberg 2 to target each other with their missile fire. This submarine is represented by a 2/3 scale prop on a full-sized set in some scenes and by a smaller model on a miniature set in other scenes.
Nuclear Ballistic Missile Submarine Potemkin	Soviet Navy	A fictional ballistic missile submarine of the nuclear-powered Yankee Class, bearing the name of a famous Russian battleship that experienced a mutiny in 1905. The 34 real-life members of the Yankee Class served as the Soviet Navy's main nuclear deterrent force from 1967 to 1995. They carry 16 SLBM missiles and 4 torpedo tubes. In the film dialogue, Potemkin is described as being lost under mysterious circumstances. As such, the rest of the plot revolves around Soviet Agent XXX's search for this missing submarine (together with 007's search for a missing British sub). It appears again as a captive submarine, rechristened Stromberg 1 (though external shots seem to show it as Stromberg 2) aboard the supertanker Liparus, where it is re-crewed with Stromberg sailors and deployed at sea to launch a nuclear missile at Washington DC in the film's climax. This is part of a plan intended to provoke WWIII between the United States and The Soviet Union, in order to wipe out all surface civilization, so that a Utopian civilization beneath the sea can be built anew by the super-villain, Karl Stromberg. It is destroyed by a nuclear warhead, when Bond tricks the Captains of Stromberg 1 and Stromberg 2 to target each other with their missile fire. This submarine is represented by a 2/3 scale prop on a full-sized set in some scenes and by a smaller model on a miniature set in other scenes.
Porpoise or Oboron Class Attack Submarine	Royal Navy	A conventional diesel/electric attack submarine of the British Royal Navy. Originally classified as patrol submarines and later as attack submarines, these two nearly identical types served concurrently from 1956 to 1990, throughout most of the cold war. At least one Oberon Class boat also served in the Falklands war. They were also used by Australia, Canada, Brazil, and Chile. One of these submarines (with crewmen assembled on her deck) can be conspicuously seen in the background, pacing Bond and the Defense Minister as they walk along the pier at Faslane Naval Base in Scotland. Another similar vessel is visible moored to the pier.
HMS Fearless	Royal Navy	A Royal Navy warship that serves as M's base of operations at sea. She captured the escape pod with Bond and Amasova aboard at the climax of the film.
Moonraker (1979)
Gondola-hovercraft	Q-Branch/James Bond	Designed by car designer Peter Bohanna who is believed to have kept a gondola prototype after filming wrapped, storing it at the Leatherne Bottel in Goring-on-Thames. It is alleged to have sunk on the River Thames during filming of an episode of The Val Doonican Show.
Glastron CV23HT hydrofoil boat	Q-Branch/James Bond	Used by Bond to locate Hugo Drax's Amazon river source for the deadly nerve gas
Glastron SSV-189 speedboats	Drax Enterprises	Used by Drax henchmen during the Amazon river chase
For Your Eyes Only (1981)
St Georges	MI6 Intelligence Surveillance Ship	
SS Colombina	Milos Columbo	
Triana	Timothy Havelock, later Melina Havelock	
Neptune	Timothy Havelock, later Melina Havelock	Used by Sir Timothy for underwater research
Octopussy (1983)
Alligator Boat	Q-Branch/James Bond	
A View to a Kill (1985)
Iceberg	MI6	
Glastron Carlson C-537	Max Zorin	Used to retrieve Mayday on the Seine after the assassination of Achille Aubergine
The Living Daylights (1987)
None
Licence to Kill (1989)
SS Wavekrest	Milton Krest	
Sentinel Mini Sub	Milton Krest	
GoldenEye (1995)
La Fayette-class frigate	French Navy	
Manticore yacht	Janus Corporation	
Tomorrow Never Dies (1997)
Stealth ship	Elliot Carver	Elliot Carver's stealth ship and one of his lairs. It was destroyed by HMS Bedford.
HMS Devonshire	Royal Navy	The Royal Navy warship that Mr. Stamper sunk in order to goad China and the United Kingdom into warfare, on behalf of Carver. No survivors from the sinking.
HMS Bedford	Royal Navy	The Royal Navy warship that destroyed Carver's ship, and then went to rescue Bond and Wai Lin from the wreckage.
HMS Chester	Royal Navy	The Royal Navy warship seen in the pre-titles sequence, responsible for destroying a terrorist arms market on the Russian border, on the orders of Rear Admiral Benson.
The World Is Not Enough (1999)
Q's retirement recreational boat	Q	Weapons systems: At least 2 torpedoes and grenade launcher. Bond fires 2 torpedoes at an assassin's boat, destroying it. Part of the Ian Fleming Foundation collection in Florida. The boat has a single jet engine to assist in propulsion.
Sunseeker Superhawk 34		Bond, in his Q-boat, chases the Sunseeker that is being piloted down the River Thames by assassin Giulietta da Vinci.
Unidentified Russian Victor III class submarine	Russian Navy	Used as an integral part of the villains' scheme to cripple the global oil market. By inserting weapons-grade plutonium into the reactor, the submarine would effectively become a floating nuclear bomb, which would then be detonated in the middle of the Bosphorus.
Die Another Day (2002)
Slingsby SAH 2200 Hovercraft	Colonel Moon	Used by Bond in a hovercraft-chase in the Korean Demilitarized Zone. Now on display at the Hovercraft Museum, Lee-on-the-Solent.
Osprey 5 Hovercraft	Colonel Moon	Used by Bond in a hovercraft-chase in the Korean Demilitarized Zone.
Sunseeker Superhawk 48		Jinx climbed onboard after she escaped Isla Los Organos, diving of a high cliff.
Casino Royale (2006)
Spirit 54		James Bond and Vesper Lynd sail from Montenegro to Venice on a Spirit 54 sailing yacht
Sunseeker Predator 108	Le Chiffre	
Sunseeker XS 2000		
Quantum of Solace (2008)
Sunseeker Sovereign 17		
Sunseeker Superhawk 43		
Skyfall (2012)
Chimera		Pruva Regina yacht
Spectre (2015)
Inflatable boat	MI6	Used to take Bond and Tanner to Q's new lab in London
Unidentified speed boat	Stolen by Bond and Madeleine	Bond and Madeleine use this boat to chase down Ernst Stavro Blofeld and prevent him from escaping in his helicopter.
No Time to Die (2021)
Spirit 46		Used as Bond's personal sailboat in Jamaica. Later used once more to go to Cuba to investigate a SPECTRE meeting.
Blue Angel fishing boat		This boat is used by Felix Leiter as a rendezvous point so Bond can enter it and interrogate Vladvo Obruchev for information. The boat is later blown up by Logan Ash when he reveals himself as a double agent working for Safin. The name of the boat is never revealed in the film.
Unnamed Container Ship	CMA CGM	Used to rescue James Bond at sea after being betrayed by Logan Ash.
Unidentified patrol vessels		Shown heading to Safin's base to retrieve Heracles from it.
HMS Dragon	Royal Navy	Used to fire missiles at Safin's base to destroy remaining heracles inside. The missiles also hit Bond when he is forced to sacrifice himself after being infected by nanobots by Safin.

=== Spacecraft and space weapons ===
Film	Vehicle	Owner	Notes
Dr. No	Mercury-Redstone Launch Vehicle and lunar Mercury capsule	NASA	Likely operated by an unknown NASA astronaut (the eventual manning of the mission is not discussed) for a lunar orbit spaceflight. Dr. No's goal is to sabotage the launch, causing the mission's failure and eventually the death of the astronaut, assuming there was one. Actually, the rocket sequence was the video of a Titan ICBM test, not a Mercury launch.
You Only Live Twice	Gemini Jupiter 16 capsule	NASA/McDonnell Aircraft	During its fourth orbit's spacewalk by the astronaut Chris, is captured by SPECTRE's Bird One. Chris is killed and the other astronaut is imprisoned in SPECTRE's Japanese base.
You Only Live Twice	Bird One	SPECTRE/Ernst Stavro Blofeld	Used by SPECTRE cosmonauts to capture NASA and Soviet capsules after launches in a crater in Japan. It is probably inspired by the Augmented Target Docking Adapter, nicknamed "the angry alligator". Bond uses a self-destruct button in Blofeld's lair to destroy the Bird One spacecraft.
You Only Live Twice	Soviet capsule	Soviet space program	Also captured by Bird One, is a fictional Soviet spacecraft. Its launch sequence is really the launch of a Project Mercury mission.
You Only Live Twice	Gemini Jupiter ? capsule	NASA/McDonnell Aircraft	Another Gemini capsule, used in a mission during an attempt of capture by the Bird One. After the Bird One (disguised as a Soviet spacecraft) explodes as Bond used the SPECTRE computing devices, the capsule successfully reenters in Earth's atmosphere.
Diamonds Are Forever	Willard Whyte's rocket and Blofeld's satellite	Willard Whyte and SPECTRE/Ernst Stavro Blofeld	Used after a large diamond smuggling, the satellite is built with diamonds and it can project a powerful laser on nuclear submarines, nuclear missiles silos.
Moonraker	Moonraker 1, Moonraker 2, Moonraker 3, Moonraker 4, Moonraker 6	Drax Industries/Sir Hugo Drax	Space Shuttle orbiter-like spacecraft originally built by Drax Industries for the World's space agencies, but used to transport Drax's "perfect" humans to his personal space station. One orbiter is stolen from an SCA-like Boeing 747 while en route to the United Kingdom, destroying the airplane, to replace another one which had problems, leading MI6 to investigate.
Moonraker	Moonraker 5	Drax Industries/Sir Hugo Drax	Drax's own laser-equipped spacecraft. It is stolen by Bond and Goodhead to destroy nerve gas globes.
Moonraker	Drax's space station	Drax Industries/Sir Hugo Drax	Huge stealth spacecraft used by Drax in his plan. It is full of nerve gas globes that should kill "unperfect" humans.
Moonraker	Marines's shuttles	USMC	Used during the Marines's attack to the station, they transport soldiers with laser rifles.
GoldenEye	Petya and Misha	Soviet Armed Forces/Russian Space Forces	Two Cold War GoldenEye satellite nuclear weapons (used to generate electromagnetic pulses by exploding in orbit) stolen by Russian General Ouromov and the Janus syndicate.
Tomorrow Never Dies	CMGN satellite	Carver Media Group Network	Satellite used by CMGN programmers to launch their new specifically defective software and used by Henri Gupta to hack for Elliot Carver.
Die Another Day	Icarus	Colonel Tan-Sun Moon/Gustav Graves and some Korean People's Army Generals	Avowedly a mirror to reflect sunlight, it is actually a huge and powerful sun gun-like satellite which can be programmed to individuate and follow heat sources. Graves plans to use Icarus for a Korean invasion of East Asia.

== Vehicles in books ==
This list includes all types of vehicles.

Title	Vehicle	Owner	Notes
Casino Royale	Bentley 4½ Litre	James Bond	Fleming does not say what year the car is, although he describes it as "one of the last 4½-litre Bentleys with the supercharger by Amherst Villiers." James Bond bought the car "almost new in 1933 and had kept it in careful storage through the war." Near the end of the novel, he crashes it in France.
Casino Royale	Citroën	Le Chiffre	Le Chiffre kidnaps Vesper Lynd from the casino in this car. Fleming describes it as a "beetle-browed Citroën" and later describes its "front-wheel drive and low chassis." This description likely makes it a Traction Avant model.
Live and Let Die	Boeing 377 Stratocruiser	BOAC	007 takes Stratocruiser on his journeys to America.
Live and Let Die	Buick limousine	United States Government	After his arrival at Idlewild Airport, Halloran picks Bond up in a black Buick limousine.
Live and Let Die	1933 Bentley 4½ Litre	James Bond	This is Bond's personal car, which he presumably had repaired after the accident in France. Bond drives this from his flat to his Regent's Park office. Unlike in Casino Royale, Fleming lists the car's year explicitly.
Live and Let Die	Silver Phantom	Seaboard Air Line Railroad	Bond and Solitaire take this train from Pennsylvania Station and get off at Jacksonville. This name represents the real Silver Star.
Live and Let Die	Silver Meteor	Seaboard Air Line Railroad	After detraining at Jacksonville from the Silver Phantom, Bond and Solitaire take the sister train for the rest of the trip. Unlike the Silver Phantom, which was a name Fleming conceived, the Meteor was a real train. Bond takes this train again in Goldfinger.
Live and Let Die	Cord Model 812	Felix Leiter	Bond takes the car from Felix Leiter after he is injured and drives it down to the docks to get into the wild shootout with the Robber. Bond notes that the car was "fifteen years old, he reflected, yet still one of the most modern-looking cars in the world." Assuming the book takes place in 1952, this would make the car a 1937.
Live and Let Die	Secatur	Mr Big	Luxurious black yacht with grey superstructure built in 1947 for a certain millionaire, later acquired by Mr Big who uses it for smuggling gold coins from Jamaica to the USA. 21-metre (70 ft) long, powered by twin General Motor Diesels and capable of doing 20 knots (37 km/h; 23 mph). Bond destroys it with the limpet mine killing everyone aboard including Mr Big in the novel's climax.
Live and Let Die	Sunbeam-Talbot 90 Coupe	John Strangways	Commander Strangways gives this car to Bond.
Moonraker	1930 Bentley 4½ Litre	James Bond	This is James Bond's same car from Casino Royale, although the year has changed from 1933 to 1930. It is unclear whether this was Fleming's intention or was written in error. After Bond crashes it near the end of the novel, he says that it has "gone to its grave in a Maidstone garage."
Moonraker	Moonraker	Sir Hugo Drax	A prototype nuclear intercontinental ballistic missile used for an attempt of destruction of London.
Moonraker	Mercedes-Benz 300S	Hugo Drax	Used in car chase to Dover
Moonraker	Alfa Romeo Supercharged Straight-8	RAF officer	Passes Bond during the car chase with Drax. Bond guesses the car is a 1932 or 1933, and says the owner is probably a "hot-rod type from one of the RAF stations round here." Drax pushes the car off the road, killing the driver.
Moonraker	AEC Mammoth Major newsprint lorry	Bowater	In the A20 car chase, Hugo Drax pulls his Mercedes-Benz 300S alongside this lorry. Krebs climbs onto it and cuts the ties securing the rolls of newsprint. They roll into the road, causing Bond to crash his 4½-Litre Bentley and thus ending the chase.
Moonraker	Bentley Mark VI	James Bond	Made in 1953, Bond purchases his second Bentley towards the end of the novel, Moonraker. Like his previous Bentley, the Mark VI is grey with dark blue leather upholstery. After Moonraker this model is never mentioned again. Fleming describes it as having an "open touring body." Bentley built the last Mark IVs in 1952, which makes Fleming's choice of 1953 ambiguous. Either he gave this year mistakenly or possibly referred to the car's coachwork, which could have been built that year.
Diamonds Are Forever	Studillac	Felix Leiter	A custom black Studebaker convertible with a Cadillac engine, plus special transmission, brakes and rear axle, owned by Felix Leiter in the novel Diamonds Are Forever. The combination of the aerodynamic Raymond Loewy-designed body with the powerful Cadillac engine made it into a remarkable sports car. Studillacs were not fictional, but actually built by a Long Island, NY company called Bill Frick Motors from 1953 Studebaker Starlight bodies.
Diamonds Are Forever	Lockheed G Super Constellation	TWA	This is the plane that takes Bond and Tiffany from LA via Chicago to NYC
Diamonds Are Forever	RMS Queen Elizabeth	Cunard Line	Liner that takes Bond and Tiffany across the Atlantic
Diamonds Are Forever	English Electric Canberra	RAF	This is the plane that takes Bond to Sierra Leone
From Russia With Love	Ilyushin Il-12	N/A	This is the plane that takes Red Grant from Crimea to Moscow
From Russia With Love	Rolls-Royce Silver Ghost	Kerim Bey	Bond is picked up with this car at Yesilkoy airport. Fleming describes the car as "an old black basketwork Rolls-Royce coupé-de-ville that Bond guessed must have been built for some millionaire of the '20s."
From Russia With Love	Vickers Viscount	British European Airways	Bond's takes the "10.30 BEA Flight 130 to Rome, Athens, and Istanbul."
From Russia With Love	Orient Express	Compagnie Internationale des Wagons-Lits	
Dr. No	Rolls-Royce Silver Wraith	M	Drives M to MI6 headquarters. Described as "the old black Silver Wraith Rolls with the nondescript number-plate."
Dr. No	Lockheed L-1049 Super Constellation	N/A	This is the plane that takes Bond to Jamaica
Dr. No	The "Dragon"	Dr No	Dr No describes the vehicle as a "marsh buggy–the vehicle that is used for oil prospecting." Bond says that the wheels "with their vast smooth rubber tyres, were nearly twice as tall as himself," and "a long metal dragon's head had been added to the front of the radiator and the headlamps had been given black centres to make 'eyes'. That was all there was to it, except that the cabin had been covered with an armoured dome and the flame-thrower added."
Goldfinger	Aston Martin DB Mark III	MI6	
Goldfinger	Rolls-Royce Silver Ghost	Auric Goldfinger	Goldfinger uses it to smuggle gold.
Goldfinger	Triumph TR3	Tilly Masterton	Masterton uses it to pursue Goldfinger across France. Bond later rams this car with his Aston Martin.
Goldfinger	Bristol Freighter	N/A	Transports Goldfinger's Rolls-Royce to France
Goldfinger	Beechcraft Model 18	Goldfinger	Goldfinger uses this plane for air surveillance of Fort Knox
Goldfinger	Boeing 377 Stratocruiser	Auric Goldfinger	In Goldfinger the final battle is set on-board this plane.
"From a View to a Kill"	Peugeot 403	Marie Ann Russell	Bond uses Marie Ann Russell's car while on assignment in France.
"From a View to a Kill"	BSA M20	SHAPE, Bond, Soviet agent	Serves a major role in the plot as Bond disguises himself as a despatch rider in order to get close to the enemy spy
"For Your Eyes Only"	Ford Consul	Major Gonzales	The trio uses a stolen car to get from Havelock's estate to Port Antonio
"For Your Eyes Only"	Chris Craft Constellation	Major Gonzales and his henchmen	Described as a glittering 50 ton Chris Craft, it is used by the Gonzales and his men to sail from Jamaica to Cuba after murdering Havelocks. Judging by the weight spec mentioned in the story it is probably the Constellation model
"For Your Eyes Only"	de Havilland Comet	N/A	Bond takes this plane to Canada instead of old Stratocruiser
"Quantum of Solace"			
"Risico"	Colombina	Enrico Colombo	200 tons former fishing vessel with a sail Colombo uses for his smuggling operations in the Adriatic. Its battle with Kristatos's ship is the novel's climax.
"The Hildebrand Rarity"	Wavekrest	Milton Krest	Luxurious white yacht owned by a rude American millionaire Krest who uses it for his voyages around the world as well as for his hunt of rare fish specimens for his foundation. Built by Bronson Shipbuilding Corporation and designed by Rosenblatts. Specifications: Length 30.48 metres (100.0 ft), Width 6.4 metres (21 ft), Weight 200 t, Two 500 horsepower Superior diesel engines, double propellers, top speed 14 knots (26 km/h; 16 mph). As Bond remarks after seeing it: "It was a real ship, built to cruise the world and not just Florida Keys."
"The Hildebrand Rarity"	SS Kampala	British India Steam Navigation Company	The ship that took Bond to Seychelles and the one he was waiting for to return him to Mombasa at the beginning of the story.
Thunderball	Ford Consul	Felix Leiter	Leiter rents this car for the purpose of his mission
Thunderball	Humber Super Snipe Series II		Bond and Leiter take a brief tour in a car that belongs to the governor of the Bahamas.
Thunderball	Bentley Mark II Continental	James Bond	A Bentley Mark II Continental was featured in the novel Thunderball and is Bond's final Bentley. Bond, having purchased the car in a wrecked state, upgrades the engine from a 4.5 L engine to a 4.9 L and has a custom drophead body from Mulliners. The Mark II was also grey; however, the interior was black leather. The Mark II Continental reappears in the novel On Her Majesty's Secret Service where Bond upgrades the vehicle once again with an Arnott supercharger controlled by a magnetic clutch, causing Rolls-Royce, worried about potential damage to the engine, to disown the car. He uses the car in a race with the Contessa Teresa di Vicenzo in her Lancia Flaminia Spyder towards the beginning of the book. Bond dubs the car "the Locomotive". This car is only mentioned once more. In Fleming's last story, "The Living Daylights", the following dialogue occurs (the name "Bentley" is not mentioned): "Never seen a body like that on a Continental. Have it made specially?" "Yes. The Mark IVs are anyway really only two-seaters. And damned little luggage space. So I got Mulliner's to make it into a real two-seater with plenty of trunk space. Selfish car I'm afraid..."
Thunderball	Disco Volante	Emilio Largo/SPECTRE	Hydrofoil white and dark blue yacht, purchased with SPECTRE funds for 200.000 pounds and used for the purposes of operation Omega by Emilio Largo. Built by Cantieri Navali Rodriquez from Messina. specifications: weight 100 t, powered by two Daimler-Benz four-stroke Diesels supercharged by twin Brown-Boveri turbo superchargers, top speed about 50 knots (93 km/h; 58 mph), equipped with Decca Navigator System. The yacht's hull has a hidden hatch like Olterra which is used to smuggle atomic bombs on board.
Thunderball	U.S. submarine Manta	United States Navy	U.S. nuclear George Washington-class submarine used by Bond and Leiter in their pursuit after Disco Volante.
Thunderball	Underwater chariot	SPECTRE	Used for transporting the bombs from the underwater cave to Disco Volante.
Thunderball	Grumman Amphibian	Bond and Leiter	The two use this plane in search of a missing bomber.
The Spy Who Loved Me	Vespa 150-cc Gran Sport	Vivienne Michel	Vivienne Michel buys her Vespa in Hammersmith and has it shipped to Canada. She drives it from Montreal to Florida.
The Spy Who Loved Me	Sedan		The only description of this car is that it is a "black sedan." "Sluggsy" Morant and Sol "Horror" Horowitz drive this car to the motel.
The Spy Who Loved Me	Ford Thunderbird	Rental	Bond rents this car for the purpose of getting from Toronto to Washington.
On Her Majesty's Secret Service	Mercedes-Benz W112 saloon	Blofeld's henchmen	Upon arriving in Switzerland Bond is picked up with this car. Later they use it to pursue Bond and Tracy.
On Her Majesty's Secret Service	Lancia Flaminia Zagato Spyder	Tracy Draco	With her white model she overtakes, then races Bond in his Bentley near Royale-les-Eaux.
On Her Majesty's Secret Service	Peugeot 403		Bond is picked up by one of Draco's men, who takes him to the helicopter hideout with this car.
On Her Majesty's Secret Service	Simca Aronde		Bond rents this car to follow Tracy without being noticed.
On Her Majesty's Secret Service	Sud Aviation Caravelle	Swissair	This is the plane that takes Bond from London to Zürich.
On Her Majesty's Secret Service	Aerospatiale Alouette III	SPECTRE	This is the helicopter that takes Bond to Piz Gloria.
You Only Live Twice	Douglas DC-8	Japan Airlines	This is the plane that takes Bond to Tokyo.
You Only Live Twice	Toyopet saloon	Dikko Henderson	Henderson picks up Bond at the airport in this car.
The Man with the Golden Gun	Rolls-Royce Phantom	M	Referred to as "old, black Phantom Rolls", it takes M to SIS Headquarters after his lunch at Blades.
The Man with the Golden Gun	Ford Thunderbird	Francisco Scaramanga	Bond follows this car to Thunderbird hotel
The Man with the Golden Gun	Chris Craft Roamer	Francisco Scaramanga	A 12-metre (40 ft) boat that Scaramanga intends to use for deep-sea fishing to entertain his mobster guests.
"Octopussy"	no vehicles		
"The Living Daylights"	Opel Kapitän	MI6 agent	Uses car's engine noise to cover up Bond's shooting.
"The Property of a Lady"			
"007 in New York"			
Licence Renewed	Saab 900	James Bond	Bond's personal car, aka The Silver Beast
The Man from Barbarossa	Saab 900	James Bond	
Never Send Flowers	Saab 900	James Bond	
SeaFire	Saab 900	James Bond	
Nobody Lives for Ever	Saab 9000		Rented by Bond
No Deals, Mr. Bond	Saab 9000		Rented by Bond

== Vehicles in video games ==
This list includes all types of vehicles that are either playable and driven by the player in the video games or not playable and act as enemy vehicles or only appear in cutscenes. Some vehicles that are not playable are sometimes ridden by the player required to shoot down enemy vehicles in a few games.

=== Playable vehicles ===
Video game	Vehicle	Owner	Notes
A View to a Kill	Taxi (Based off the Renault 11 from the film)		Used in the first section of the game where it is driven by James Bond to follow May Day through Paris.
Live and Let Die	Speedboat		Used in all levels based on the iconic boat chase from the film.
007: License to Kill	Helicopter (Based off the Eurocopter HH-65 Dolphin from the film)		Playable vehicle used in Level 01 and Level 03. In the first level, it is used to chase down Braun while in the third level it is used to chase Sanchez in his plane.
The Spy Who Loved Me	Wet Nellie		Playable vehicle mostly used.
The Spy Who Loved Me	Speedboat		Playable in one level where it is switched from Wet Nellie. The boat is colored red. Enemy NPC speedboats are colored green.
The Spy Who Loved Me	Jet ski		Playable in a level where you must rescue Anya from Stromberg's fortress. Red jetskis are NPCs that the player must destroy.
GoldenEye 007	T-55	Stolen by James Bond	Playable vehicle in "Mission 3: Runway" and "Mission 6: St. Petersburg" in the streets section.
Tomorrow Never Dies	L-39 Albatros (mistaken to be a MiG)	Stolen by James Bond	Bond steals this plane at the end of the level "Arms Bazaar". The PS1 version has the player control the plane for a short time, shooting enemies before taking off.
Tomorrow Never Dies	BMW 750il		The same vehicle in the film, is first shown in the level "Hotel Atlantic, Hamburg" where Bond eventually uses it to escape. It is later a playable vehicle in the level "Convoy, Swiss Alps", where the player is required to take out a terrorist convoy. The vehicle is armed with machine guns and missiles that could only be activated if the player picks up a batch of them. Unlike the film, it is not destroyed.
007 Racing	Aston Martin DB5		Playable in the levels "Escape the border", "Ambush", "Highway Hazard".
007 Racing	1998 Ford Mustang		Used in the level "Gimme a Break" where you are required to collect all transmitters before jettisoning the vehicle. It is replaced by the DB5 in the second half of the level.
007 Racing	BMW Z3		Playable in the level "Survive the Jungle", "Airstrike", and "Escape"
007 Racing	BMW 750il		Playable in the level "Breakout" (via remote control) and "River Race"
007 Racing	BMW Z8		Playable in the level "Download"
007 Racing	Lotus Espirit		Playable in the level "Submerged" and "Showdown"
007 Racing	Aston Martin V8 Vantage		A secret car, is unlocked using cheat codes for multiplayer mode by pressing the buttons L1, R1, Triangle, Circle, and X.
James Bond 007: Agent Under Fire	BMW Z8	MI6	R provides Bond a new BMW Z8 that is identical to the one featured in The World Is Not Enough following Nightshade's death. It serves as a playable vehicle in the level "Dangerous Pursuit". The vehicle is equipped with machine guns and missiles, though it can also be equipped with other gadgets if the player goes through the yellow markings such as EMPs, smoke bombs, and a booster device.
James Bond 007: Agent Under Fire	Aston Martin DB5		Playable in the level "Streets of Bucharest". It is equipped with its gadgets that include machine guns as well as missiles and rockets if the player picks it up. It is later destroyed at the end of the level.
James Bond 007: Agent Under Fire	Russian Army Tank	Stolen by James Bond	In the second half of the level "Streets of Bucharest", Bond steals an ex-Soviet Army tank after crash landing his iconic DB5 in Romania. The tank is a playable vehicle and you could use either its Gatling gun or the gun barrel.
James Bond 007: Agent Under Fire	Lotus Espirit		The vehicle is unlocked as a bonus car if the player obtains a gold rank in "Streets of Bucharest".
James Bond 007: Nightfire	Shelby Cobra	Dominique Paradis	Dominique uses a Shelby in Paris while being chased by terrorists. It is later destroyed when Bond rescues her. The vehicle is only playable in "Alpine Escape" via cheat codes.
James Bond 007: Nightfire	Aston Martin V12 Vanquish		Bond first uses it in the level "Paris Prelude" after rescuing Dominique and foiling a terrorist plot to bomb a New Year's Eve celebration in Paris. It is also playable in the second half "Alpine Escape" where Bond and Nightshade use it to escape Drake's forces. The vehicle is equipped with its usual refinements such as guns, smokescreens, and rockets, but the vehicle also transforms itself into a submarine reminiscent of Wet Nellie.
James Bond 007: Nightfire	Armored SUV	Stolen by James Bond	In the level "Island Infiltration", Bond uses a modified armored SUV to infiltrate Drake's island in the South Pacific. The SUV is armed with missiles and other gadgets the player could use to take out enemy SUVs. The vehicle resembles a Chevrolet Avalanche.
Everything or Nothing	Porsche Cayenne Turbo		Bond is provided a Porsche Cayenne Turbo for his mission to rescue Nadanova from a research facility in Sahara and preventing nanobot prototypes. He would later use the vehicle to chase down a train where Nadanova is being held hostage before it is destroyed when it falls off a bridge just as Bond himself gets on the train in the level "Train Chase". Bond is later provided with another Porsche as a replacement when he goes to Peru to track Serena St. Germaine. The Porsche Cayenne is equipped with forward-mounted machine guns, heat-seeking missiles, and a cloaking device rendering the car invisible. It can also deploy an RC car.
Everything or Nothing	Helicopter	Stolen by James Bond	In the level "Sand Storm", James Bond and Dr. Nadanova steal a helicopter from the armored train to chase down a terrorist general who has stolen the remaining nanobots.
Everything or Nothing	Triumph Daytona 600	MI6	James Bond rides a Triumph Daytona as a getaway vehicle when escaping from Peru from Diavolo in the level "A Show of Force". The vehicle was Agent 003's bike but was used by Bond following the agent's death. Bond would use the vehicle to destroy Jaws's tanker truck (The Portcharain Bridge).
Everything or Nothing	Tank		The tank isn't a playable driving vehicle, although the player (as James Bond) only interacts with the tank's turret and Gatling gun in the level "A Show of Force", with Serena St. Germaine acting as the driver when they escape Peru from Diavolo's forces.
Everything or Nothing	Platinum Tank		
Everything or Nothing	Aston Martin V12 Vanquish	MI6	The same car from "Die Another Day" and "Nightfire". According to Q in the video game continuity, it has been revealed that the Aston Martin V12 Vanquish has been destroyed in Bond's previous missions, but has recently been resurrected and equipped with missiles, machine guns, electromagnet, and an acid slick. Bond uses this car in New Orleans to rendezvous with Agent Starling. At one point, Bond would hide his Aston Martin in a Volo Tech delivery truck so he can infiltrate a warehouse undetected to spy on Yayakov's plan from one of his agents who escapes via limo. Bond chases the henchmen, interrogates him, and finds out that Yayakov is on his way to the club to kill Mya Starling ("Mardi Gras Mayhem"). After rescuing Mya and taking her to the MI6 safehouse, Bond would use the Aston Martin to go to Diavolo's compound and destroy it via a remote-controlled car before dropping Mya at her apartment.
Everything or Nothing	Delivery truck		In the level Mardi Gras Mayhem, Bond drives a delivery truck to one of Diavolo's compounds in New Orleans so he can get information from one of his associates. The truck also serves as a hiding place for James Bond's Aston Martin V12 Vanquish.
Everything or Nothing	Limousine	Diavolo's henchmen, MI6	One of Diavolo's henchmen uses a limousine to escape that is destroyed by James Bond. Later, Bond drives a limousine to take Agent Mya Starling to a safehouse.
Everything or Nothing	Rally Car	Stolen by James Bond	Bond steals a rally car upon switching places with one of Diavolo's drivers in order to participate in a rally race in order to win going to Diavolo's house for dinner. The rally car bears some resemblance to a Subaru Impreza WRX.
007 First Light	Aston Martin DBS	Stolen by James Bond	
007 First Light	Aston Martin DBS V12	MI6	
007 First Light	Aston Martin Valhalla	MI6	
007 First Light	Jaguar XJ		
007 First Light	Range Rover Sport		
007 First Light	Land Rover Defender 110		

== Exhibitions ==
In 2012 the National Motor Museum hosted Bond in Motion, an exhibition of 50 Bond cars to celebrate fifty years of Bond on film. In 2014, the exhibition moved to the London Film Museum, cars from Spectre were added in 2015.

== See also ==
- List of James Bond gadgets
- Amphibious automobile
- Flying car
- Outline of James Bond
- James Bond Car Collection
