= The Old West =

Book series

- Cover of The Cowboys, the first volume of the series with illustration by Frederic Remington
- Edited by: Keith Wheeler, David Nevin, et al.
- Illustrator: Frederic Remington, Charles M. Russell, et al.
- Cover artist: various
- Country: Alexandria, Virginia, US; Amsterdam, Netherlands; London, UK; Höganäs, Sweden; Ljubljana, Yugoslavia; Tokyo, Japan
- Language: en-us, en-uk, de, fr, se, sl, jp
- Genre: History
- Publisher: Time-Life Books. Inc.: Time-Life International (Nederland) B.V.; Caxton Publishing Group; Bokorama; Cankarjeva Založba; Taimuraihubukkusu
- Published: 1973-2006
- Published in English: 1973-1980
- Media type: print
- No. of books: 26 (plus index sheet; less for foreign editions)
- OCLC: 6760666

The Old West is a series of books about the history of the American Old West era, published by Time-Life Books from 1973 through 1980. Each book focused on a different topic specific for the era, such as cowboys, American Indians, gamblers and gunfighters.

== Release overview ==
Each volume, excepting the 27th, in the series is 240 pages long, featuring many contemporary pictures and illustrations. They are bound in a padded imitation leather hardcover binding with the series name, title of the book, and publisher imprinted in gold on the spine of the book. The front cover of the book has a glued-on oval shaped picture, in most cases showcasing artwork by contemporary artists such as Frederic Remington (like the one in the infobox to the right) or Charles M. Russell – and who are otherwise heavily represented with their work on the interior pages of the series as well. Beneath the picture embossed in the faux leather is a set of cattle horns with a rising sun depicted between the horns. The outline of the cover is embossed with a rustic rope. The back cover is blank. The series was issued without a dust jacket. There are 27 volumes in the series, of which volume 27, the "Master Index", was executed as a stapled 65-page soft cover release, not featuring any illustrations:

Despite the golden age of the Western having already ended in the home market by the time the series was launched, it did manage to become one of the more popular and financially successful Time Life book series. This was further exemplified by the fact that the series remained in print for the better part of two decades, ultimately selling over three million copies in the US alone. However, it was not the series as a whole that enjoyed reprint runs, but rather the individual volumes which were reprinted according to need as some titles were more appealing to the public than the others. For example, the most popular title, volume 8 – The Gunfighters – is known to have had at least ten printings, the last one in 2004. Volume 15 – The Chroniclers – on the other hand, has only three printings known, the original printing, followed by reprints in 1979 and 1981. It is, together with the Master Index, the least reprinted volume of the series, all the others having at least four printings.

=== International editions ===
Five of the more popular titles saw separate latter-day British first print versions in the UK as a standard (non-padded) hardcover in a dust jacket book format, even though British customers could originally coach along with their US counterparts by ordering the US version of the series through their nearest Time Life Books subsidiary. These five UK-specific first editions of 2004/06, featuring British spelling, were published by the London-based Caxton Publishing Group under a full license from the European "Time-Life Books B.V." (the former "Time-Life International (Nederland) B.V." Amsterdam branch) as specified in the colophons of the UK volumes, which had managed to stay in business a few years longer after the American "Time Life Books, Inc." mother division had gone defunct in 2001 as a dedicated book publisher.

As an American-specific topic, this series was not widely translated into other languages, but two identically executed foreign-language editions were nonetheless released by the "Time-Life International (Nederland) B.V." Amsterdam branch themselves; the 1978-1980 German-language Der Wilde Westen edition, which was shy of six volumes (seven when counting the "Master Index"), and the 1978-1981 French-language Le Far West edition, equally shy of six (or seven) volumes. That the series was partially translated into these two languages was not only due to the historical ties both France and Germany had with the era in question, but also because the Western genre has never gone out of vogue in either country, particularly in Germany where the popularity of the genre has since the days of Karl May remained unabated, unlike in native USA. As with the American edition, several of the more popular volumes saw multiple reprint runs in West-Germany. Of the most popular one, volume 8 called "Die Revolverhelden" (="The Gunfighters"), is known that it has seen at least six German-language printings.

Aside from these editions released by Time Life themselves, there were at least three additional, but far more obscure licensed international series editions known, all of them truncated; the oldest of these concerned the 1974-1975 Yugoslavian Resnična zgodovina Divjega zahoda ("The true history of the Wild West"), which was licensed to Slovenian publisher Cankarjeva Založba. Being the most obscure of the three, the extent of this slightly differently executed hardcover edition is therefore not known. Like in France and Germany, the Western had been a popular genre in Yugoslavia, before the outbreak of the wars that spelt the end of that nation. A ten-volume Japanese-language Daiseibu monogatari ("Large Western Story") edition is known to have been released by Tokyo-based publisher Taimuraihubukkusu in 1976, identical in exterior to the American source publications, but with Japanese-language interior texts. The third edition concerned the Swedish-language ten-volume Wild West release, published in 1984-85 by Swedish publisher Bokorama and likewise greatly resembling the American source publication. As if to underscore the appeal of these two titles, "The Gunfighters" and "The Cowboys" are the only two volumes that saw printings in all six known international editions. "The Scouts" and the "Master Index" on the other hand, are the only two titles not to see a single foreign edition.

As in the UK, other language territory customers were offered the opportunity to acquire the original American version via mail through their nearest Time Life Books subsidiary, typically by series subscription.

Volume titles of The Old West
| Title | General consultant | Volume | Year published | ISBN (Note: At the time of the series launch, ISBNs were not yet utilized. They only became commonplace during 1977, volume 20 becoming the first title provided with one upon its very first release. For the more popular older titles this meant they were only given one around their 5th-7th reprint runs. The colophons of these reprints incidentally, made it clear that a title was considered a revised (justified or not) edition when it was given its ISBN, with the original, non-ISBN endowed, printing becoming referred to by a much lower, retroactively assigned and concurrently "retired" ISBN – volume 02 for example was assigned the "retired ISBN 0685288064". Additionally, it became customary for the Time-Life Books after 1976 to bestow each of the US first-print series volumes with two ISBNs (the second one usually eight numbers higher), with the lower number indicating the retail/Direct-to-Customer (DTC) copies whereas the higher ones indicate the library binding (lib. bdg.) copies as specified in the book colophons – which remained adhered to for later, with higher newly assigned ISBNs endowed true revised editions as well, if there were any. Listed are the most common, lower retail/DTC ISBNs.) | Foreign edition (Note: de=Germany, fr=France, jp=Japan, se=Sweden, uk=United Kingdom, yu=Yugoslavia) | | | | | |
| Title | General consultant | Volume | Year published | ISBN | de | fr | jp | se | uk | yu |
|---|---|---|---|---|---|---|---|---|---|---|
| The Cowboys | William H. Forbis | 01 | 1973 | ISBN 0809414503 | Yes | Yes | Yes | Yes | Yes | Yes |
| The Indians | Benjamin Capps | 02 | 1973 | ISBN 0809414554 | Yes | Yes | Yes | | Yes | Yes |
| The Trailblazers | Bil Gilbert | 03 | 1973 | ISBN 0809414589 | Yes | Yes | | | | |
| The Soldiers | David Nevin | 04 | 1973 | ISBN 0809414643 | Yes | Yes | Yes | | Yes | |
| The Railroaders | Keith Wheeler | 05 | 1973 | ISBN 080941466X | Yes | Yes | Yes | | | |
| The Forty-Niners | William Weber Johnson | 06 | 1974 | ISBN 0809414708 | Yes | Yes | Yes | Yes | | Yes |
| The Pioneers | Huston Horn | 07 | 1974 | ISBN 0809414775 | Yes | Yes | Yes | Yes | | |
| The Gunfighters | Paul Trachtman | 08 | 1974 | ISBN 0809414791 | Yes | Yes | Yes | Yes | Yes | Yes |
| The Expressmen | David Nevin | 09 | 1974 | ISBN 0809414864 | | | Yes | Yes | | |
| The Townsmen | Keith Wheeler | 10 | 1975 | ISBN 0809414899 | | | Yes | | | |
| The Great Chiefs | Benjamin Capps | 11 | 1975 | ISBN 0809414929 | Yes | Yes | Yes | Yes | | |
| The Rivermen | Paul O'Neill | 12 | 1975 | ISBN 0809414961 | Yes | Yes | | | | |
| The Texans | David Nevin | 13 | 1975 | ISBN 0809415003 | | | | Yes | | |
| The Loggers | Richard Williams | 14 | 1976 | ISBN 0809415259 | Yes | Yes | | | | |
| The Chroniclers | Keith Wheeler | 15 | 1976 | ISBN 0809415291 | Yes | Yes | | | | |
| The Spanish West | William H. Johnson | 16 | 1976 | ISBN 080941533X | Yes | Yes | | | | |
| The Miners | Robert Wallace | 17 | 1976 | ISBN 0809415372 | Yes | Yes | | | | |
| The Canadians | Ogden Tanner | 18 | 1977 | ISBN 0809415410 | Yes | Yes | | | | |
| The Frontiersmen | Paul O'Neill | 19 | 1977 | ISBN 0809415453 | Yes | Yes | | | | |
| The Alaskans | Keith Wheeler | 20 | 1977 | ISBN 0809415062 | Yes | Yes | | | | |
| The Ranchers | Ogden Tanner | 21 | 1977 | ISBN 0809415089 | | | | Yes | | |
| The Mexican War | David Nevin | 22 | 1978 | ISBN 0809423022 | | | | Yes | | |
| The Women | Joan Swallow Reiter | 23 | 1978 | ISBN 0809415143 | Yes | Yes | | Yes | | |
| The Scouts | Keith Wheeler | 24 | 1978 | ISBN 0809423065 | | | | | | |
| The Gamblers | Robert Wallace | 25 | 1978 | ISBN 0809423081 | Yes | Yes | | | | |
| The End and The Myth | Paul O'Neill | 26 | 1979 | ISBN 0809423146 | Yes | Yes | | | | |
| Master Index | Gail Partoyan | 27 | 1980 | ISBN 0809423189 (Note: A library binding edition is known with the deviant lower ISBN 0809423170, according to the colophon of the regular release.) | | | | | | |

=== Slipcase ===
When the series was launched the publisher tried to entice customers to take out a subscription by offering a promotional gold-imprinted hardboard slipcase which held the volumes The Ranchers, The Gunfighters and The Trailblazers.

=== Excerpt ===
A 432-page abridged excerpt hardcover variant edition with dust jacket, its chapter organization roughly following the series topics, was published in October 1990 by educational publisher Prentice Hall as "The Old West" (ISBN 0136311512). Though licensed to Prentice Hall, the book sported the Time Life logo on its spine. Old West historian Robert M. Utley (who had not contributed to the main series) provided the foreword for the excerpt edition.

=== Home market reprints ===
Until the mid-1980s, reprints were reissued in the same format as the original printing. A few of the more popular volumes were later printed (usually after their 5th-7th printing) as more traditional hardcover editions, with new cover art and where the 1997/1999 reprints are concerned with dust jackets, but all of them dispensing with the padded faux leather cover. Since only a handful of titles were reissued as such, they were hardly recognizable as series volumes, and could easily be considered/confused as standalone editions, especially because each of them was released irregularly. Additionally, these latter-day reprints were issued in comparatively small numbers, making them quite rare in comparison to the ubiquitous faux leather editions. Furthermore, many reprints were issued with new ISBNs, especially when it concerned a revised edition.

The following titles are known to have seen latter-day reprints in a different format,

- The Gunfighters (1986, 1999, ISBN 0809414813, 0783549040)
- The Gamblers (1997, ISBN 0783549032)
- The Cowboys (1999, ISBN 0783549024)

The prolific reprint runs has made the series one of the more easily obtainable Time Life book series in the used-book market, the original faux leather bound editions in particular.

=== Spin-offs ===
The success of the series has enticed Time-Life to delve somewhat deeper into the subject of the Old West with follow-up releases as companion series. The first of these concerned, Classics of the Old West (1980-84, 31 volumes, OCLC 751388477), deluxe reproductions of memoirs written by Old West contemporaries and eyewitnesses, which was started right upon the conclusion of the main series. Most of these works had actually already been used as primary reference sources for quotation/citation purposes in the main series. To further reinforce the connection between the two series, it was decided to execute the Classics in the same vein as the main series as faux leather bound volumes with embossed Old West symbology on the padded hardcover, without a cover illustration, but gilt-edged to emphasize the deluxe visual appeal of the series. This was followed by the much smaller, but very similar, from the Native American perspective related Native American Voices series. As one of Time-Life Books' most obscure series releases, only six series volumes are known to have been released in the 1991-93 time period. Time Life has repeated this formula fourfold more shortly afterwards, for their World War II, The Epic of Flight, The Civil War, and Mysteries of the Unknown series.

A third supplementary series was less heavy handed on the connections with the main series and concerned Time-Life Books own proprietary The American Indians series (1992–96, 24 volumes, re-titled to The Native Americans for reprinted volumes). The role of the Native Americans in the history of the Old West could not be covered as in-depth in the main series as their huge part in it warranted, due to the broad scope of the subject matter. The Time Life editors apparently felt likewise and decided to dedicate a separate series to the Native Americans, which not only covered their place in American history, but also paid ample attention to their culture. There was however one clear-cut connection; one volume, "Native Americans of the Old West" (1995, OCLC 1051097745), was actually a reprint of volume 2 of the main series, "The Indians" (essentially constituting its 7th printing), and was the only volume in the series to run for 240 pages instead of the standard 176 pages for the rest of the series, aside from lacking an ISBN as well.

Additionally, and beyond the aforementioned 1990 excerpt edition release, Time Life saw four further single titles releases dealing with the subject matter. Titles thus released concerned,

- "The Wild West" (March 1993, 368 pages, ISBN 0446517615); companion hardcover with dust jacket book to the hereafter mentioned television series and featuring a foreword by Old West historian Dee Brown; a deluxe embossed leather bound edition was also released prior to the retail version.
- "America's Wild West: A Pictorial Saga of Our Frontier-Heritage" (1993, 368 pages, ISBN 0809474387, 0809474417 - second ISBN concerns the paperback edition); subsequent mass market hardback and paperback variant retail editions without dust jacket of the preceding March 1993 book title release. With the exception of the title, lack of a dust jacket and ISBN, otherwise an identical reissue of the March 1993 title.
- "Settling the West" (December 1996, 192 pages, ISBN 0783562527); hardcover with dust jacket, part of the six-volume mini-series The American Story, that dealt with selected highlights of US history
- "The Wild West: True Tales And Amazing Legends" (August 2017, 96 pages, ISBN 9781683309031); softcover magazine-style paperback release by latter-day iteration Time Inc. Books, the print subsidiary of the publisher's former owner, Time Warner, who confusingly utilized the book logo of its former possession.

Three topic related volumes were released in Time Life's own 1996-97 educational six-volume The American Story mini series, and concerned "Settling the West" (1996, ISBN 0783562527, "Defiant Chiefs" (1997, ISBN 0783562543), and "The First Settlers" (1997, ISBN 0783562551). All six 192-page series volumes were authored by Sarah Brash and were specifically written for the older high-school youth and predominantly sold to (school) libraries.

Apart from the book titles, Time-Life has under its own "Time Life Video" imprint co-released in 1994 the aforementioned 1993 documentary television mini-series The Wild West from Rattlesnake Productions. as a 10-tape VHS set, featuring two episodes per tape. Warner Home Video was the co-producer of both the series proper as well as the derivative VHS set (OCLC 29342855). Time Life followed up with its own direct-to-DVD four-disc Cowboy country : the complete story of the wild west on DVD set in 2006.

An ancient, precursory publication on the topic had been the 1963 plain hardcover volume from the early The LIFE History of the United States series, the by American historian Margaret L. Coit authored volume 4 ("The Sweep Westward, 1829-1849", OCLC 5876270), endowed with a revised 1974 hardcover reprint edition, which was followed by a 1979 in faux burgundy red leatherette executed deluxe reprint edition (OCLC 3020923, 5472519 respectively).

== See also ==
- The West As America Art Exhibition
