= Caxton Press =

Caxton Press may refer to:

- Caxton Press (New Zealand)
- Caxton Press (United Kingdom)
- Caxton Press (United States)

== See also ==
- Caxton and CTP Publishers and Printers
