= Time Life =

Former American publishing company

- Type: Private
- Industry: Publishing
- Founded: 1961; 65 years ago
- Defunct: 2023; 3 years ago
- Headquarters: New York City, New York (1961–1969); Chicago, Illinois (1969–86): Alexandria, Virginia (1977–2004); Fairfax, Virginia (1986–2023)
- Owner: Time Inc. (1961–90); Time Warner (1990–2001): AOL Time Warner (2001–2003); Ripplewood Holdings L.L.C./ZelnickMedia, Corp. (2003–2013): Direct Holdings Global L.L.C. (2003–07); Reader's Digest Association (2007–2013); Mosaic Media Investment Partners (2013–2023)
- Number of employees: 1966; 247 (Time-Life Books only); 2003; 225; 2015; 60
- Subsidiaries: Time–Life Broadcasting, Inc. (1962–1984); Time-Life Books, Inc. (1964–2003): Time-Life International (Nederland) B.V. aka Time-Life Books B.V. (1976–2009); Time-Life Music, Inc. (1967–2023): Saguaro Roads Records, Inc. (2008–2013); Time-Life Films (1969–1981): Time-Life Television (1969–1981); Time-Life Video, Inc. (1978–2017); StarVista LIVE, L.L.C. (2003–2013)
- Website: timelife.com (defunct, as of 2025)

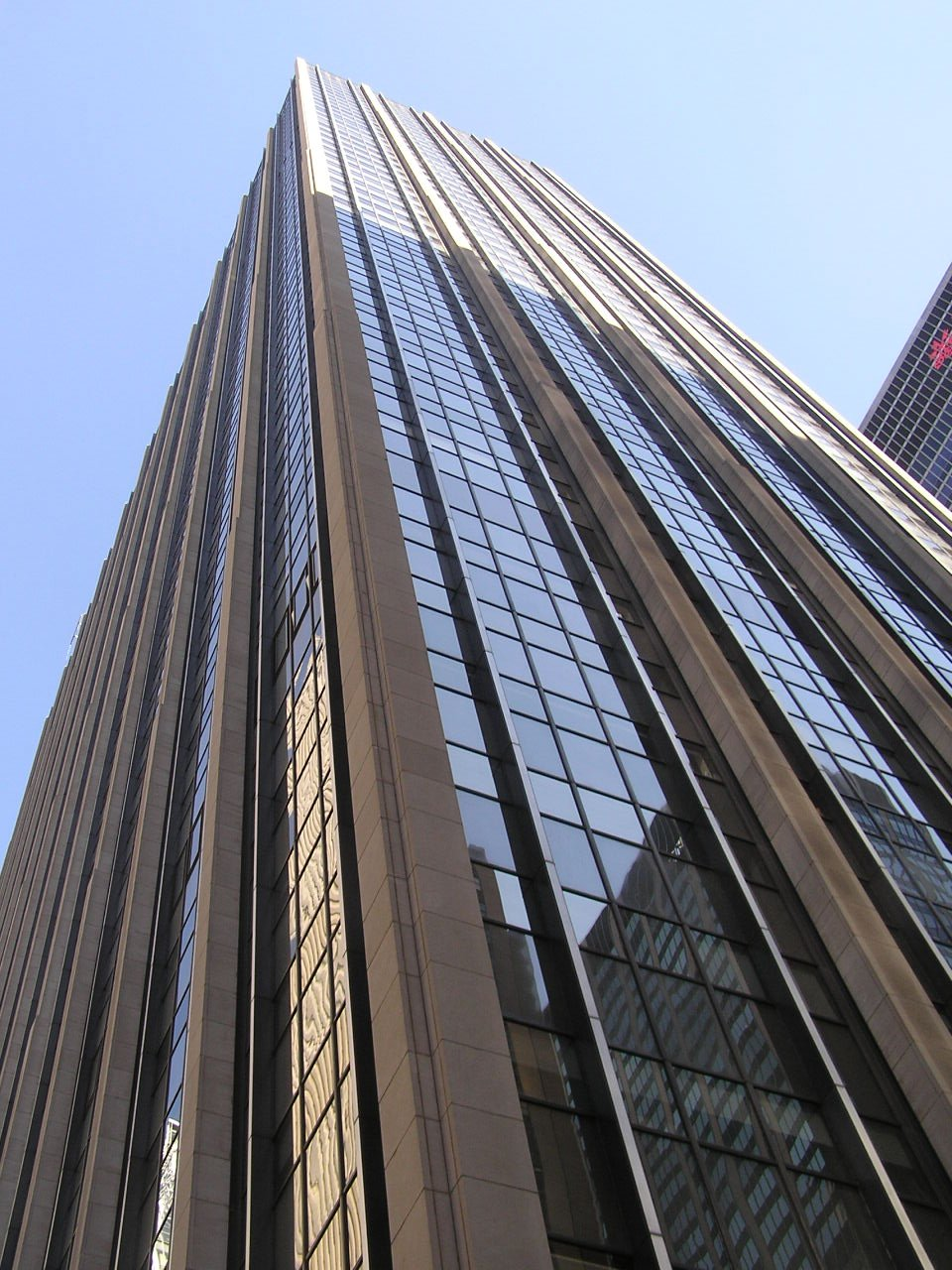
Time & Life Building on the 1271 Avenue of the Americas location in New York City, the nascent headquarters of Time-Life, Inc. from 1961 to 1969 and continuing to be so for subsidiary Time-Life Books, Inc. until 1977

Time Life, Inc. (also habitually represented with a hyphen as Time-Life, Inc., even by the company itself) was an American multi-media conglomerate company formerly known as a prolific production/publishing company and direct marketeer seller of books, music, videos/DVDs, and other multimedia products. After all home market book publication activities had been shuttered in 2003, the focus of the group shifted exclusively towards music, video, and entertainment experiences such as the StarVista cruises. Its products were once been sold worldwide throughout the Americas, Europe, Australasia, and Asia via television, print, retail, the Internet, telemarketing, and direct sales. Activities were largely restricted to the North American home market afterwards, and operations were focused on the US and Canada alone with very limited retail distribution overseas, ceasing altogether in 2023.

== Overview ==
Time-Life, Inc. was founded in 1961 as the book marketing subsidiary of the New York City-based Time Inc., the later, around 1966, coined Time & Life, Inc. (note use of different connecting characters between "Time" and "Life") and took its name from Time Inc.'s two then-flagship magazines, Time and Life. It remained independent from both however, even though the company could in the beginning draw on the editorial services of both for their early 1960s book series, particularly where pictorial content was concerned. The subsidiary moved out of the New York City premises to its own headquarters in Chicago after that building had finished construction in 1969 (though it had left the book division at New York for the editorial convenience of having the Time and Life pictorial archives nearby), before it relocated back east again to 8280 Willow Oaks Corporate Drive, Fairfax, VA 22031 in 1986 where it remained until its ultimate demise in 2023.

Starting in 1967, Time-Life combined its book offerings with music collections (two to five records) and packaged them as a sturdy box set. When record labels were no longer producing vinyl albums in 1990, Time-Life transitioned to CD. In the mid-1990s, Time-Life acquired Heartland Music, with the Heartland Music label then appearing as a brand. This company was subsequently sold off and is no longer associated with Time-Life.

In addition to the company's book and music core activities, it was also became the holding company of television and radio combo stations. Six initially individual stations were already acquired in the 1950s by mother company Time, Inc before the establishment of subsidiary Time-Life, Inc. in 1961, after which the into three consolidated combo stations became subordinated under the new subsidiary as Time–Life Broadcasting, Inc. Established in 1962, it was actually the first subsidiary Time-Life, Inc had formally split-off, even before the core book business activities themselves were two years later (see below). Stations Time-Life eventually owned were KLZ-TV-AM-FM in Denver, WFBM-TV-AM-FM in Indianapolis, WOOD-TV-AM in Grand Rapids, Michigan, KERO-TV in Bakersfield, California, and KOGO-TV-AM-FM in San Diego (the latter two acquired in the 1960s by Time-Life on its own), many of which were sold to McGraw-Hill in 1972; however, Time-Life kept WOOD-TV, which became WOTV after the sale of the other stations, and remained owned by the company until 1984.

After Walter Wanger's death in 1968, its Time-Life Films subsidiary (acquired by Time Inc. in 1969 and subordinated under Time-Life, Inc. before it was sold to Columbia Pictures Television in 1981) also bought his production company Walter Wanger Productions and many of its films. As Time-Life Film/Television, the company was right from the start also the U.S. television distributor of BBC programs as produced in the United Kingdom, until Lionheart Television took over that role in 1981.

On December 31, 2003, Time-Life was sold by Time Warner to a group of private investors including Ripplewood Holdings L.L.C. and ZelnickMedia for an undisclosed price, who subordinated their acquisition under their jointly owned, Direct Holdings Global L.L.C. holding company, founded in 1998. With that transaction, Direct Holdings US Corp became the legal name of Time-Life which was kept as a brand name however, though the copyright disclaimer had it emphatically stated that it is "not affiliated with Time Warner Inc. or Time [& Life], Inc.," the former owners of the Time and Life magazines, and from which the company name originated from in the first place (the Time magazine is currently owned by Marc Benioff and his wife Lynne as of 2018, whereas the trademarks and copyrights to the Life brand is currently owned by People Inc. as of 2021). At the time of the takeover, it was reported the Time-Life, Inc.'s turnover had contracted to US$350 million, turning a 2001 US$20 million net operating profit into a net operating loss of US$50 million in 2003. Direct Holdings sold music and video products under the Time Life brand, and was also the holding company of the StarVista LIVE L.L.C. experience entertainment property, thereby becoming responsible for Time-Life's entry into that industry in the 2003-13 time period. In March 2007, Ripplewood led a group that acquired and privatized the Reader's Digest Association (RDA) in the process agreeing to make Direct Holdings, and thus Time-Life, a subsidiary of RDA.

After having already filed for bankruptcy in 2009 for the first time, RDA sold Time-Life, Inc. to Mosaic Media Investment Partners in 2013 in order to settle outstanding financial obligations resulting from their subsequent 2012 bankruptcy. In 2023 and without so much as a whisper in contemporary media, Time-Life ended its six decades-long existence eventually, when the company and its only official online retailer were permanently shut down by its last owner, though the one remaining official website only went dark in May 2024.

Time-Life, Inc.'s progenitor company Time & Life, Inc. had remained throughout its entire existence headquartered in New York City. Its 1271 Avenue of the Americas location became Time-Life's nascent headquarters as well in the first years of its existence after Time & Life had shortly before relocated from its previous premises in Rockefeller Center in 1960. In 2014 it relocated again to smaller premises elsewhere in the city. As a brand, Time-Life actually outlived its sire by five years, as the remnants of Time & Life went defunct in early 2018 after a steady three-decades long decline (mirroring in effect the misfortunes of its erstwhile progeny), with its handful of surviving assets being broken up and sold piecemeal to a variety of third-party outsiders.

== Time-Life Books ==
As Time-Life Books, Inc. – which was not formally incorporated as an official subsidiary until 1964 – the company gained fame as a seller of book series that were directly mailed to households in (bi-)monthly installments, operating as book sales clubs, which was known as the direct-to-consumer (DTC) business model. From its very launch in 1961 it was a runaway success with sales already expected to reach US$100 million one year into its existence.

Prior to the division's establishment, Time, Inc. had already dabbled with single-title book publications on an occasional, ad-hoc basis such as the 1957 "Three Hundred Years of American Painting" (OCLC 339210) or 1961 "Great Battles of the Civil War" (OCLC 1044896) book titles as spin-offs of their two flagship magazines. It was Time, Inc. itself however, that did initiate the publication of DTC book series in 1960 with their long running 1960-67 LIFE World Library series, before it was two years later placed into the care of its newly established subsidiary.

=== Rise ===
After having tested the waters with the tentative 1960–61 trade paperback Time Capsule budget-priced book series publishing trial run (which actually evolved into their 1962-1966 Time Reading Program series, the only other known paperback book series the publisher released afterwards), the new subsidiary started out for real in 1962 with the 1960-67 LIFE World Library (the "Time" qualifier was only in 1966 added to the company's name and book logos, coinciding with the renaming of sire company "Time, Inc." to "Time & Life, Inc.") hardback series it had inherited from its mother company, with the hardback slated to become the subsidiary's staple book release format. The by the general populace perceived cachet of the hardback format where quality of both format and contents were concerned, actually lined up fully with the intent of original publisher Jerome Hardy, who had declared early on that his publishing company would succeed through a strategy to "give the customer more than he has any right to expect." Several of these book series garnered substantial critical acclaim unusual for a mass-market mail order book club/retailer of which there were several in the era, most conspicuously that of contemporary competitor Reader's Digest. On the first volume in the 1966–70 Library of Art series (the eighth one Time-Life took in production at the time) for example, American artist Rockwell Kent commented, "It would be hard for me to overstate my delight in The World of Michelangelo – not merely for its superb reproductions of the master's work but for the textual and pictorial presentation." Other examples standing out for their perceived picture/text quality included the 1970-72 LIFE Library of Photography series which featured for its time very high-quality duotone printing for its black-and-white reproductions in its original edition, having been able to draw on Life's own vast archive of journalistic and art photographs from virtually every major contemporary photographer (hence the series temporary return to the "Life"-only title), remaining in print for over a decade besides spawning two spinoff photography series. In similar vein, the 1968–77 Foods Of The World series featured contributions by renowned contemporary food writers/critics and chefs such as M. F. K. Fisher, James Beard, Julia Child, Craig Claiborne, among others. The 1978–80 The Good Cook series, edited by Richard Olney, featured likewise contributions from Jeremiah Tower, fe Grigson, Michel Lemonnier, and many others.

Other well regarded series covered nature, (urban) geography, the sciences, and (world civilization) histories, as well as an early series on contemporary life in various countries of the world. Content of all of these earlier series was somewhat academic in tone and presentation, providing the basics of the subjects in the way it might be done in a lecture aimed at the general public. One of the earliest such series concerned the 1965–68 Great Ages of Man history series, which was critically acclaimed by the Los Angeles Times where it was stated in a 1966 editorial that the series "(…)demonstrates the imposing possibilities of pictorial history… This, of course, is to be expected from the TIME-LIFE specialists. What is even more important is the selection of scholars of the reputation of Bowra and Hadas for texts. Research is meticulous and relevant. This is history written with respect for the reader's intelligence, and, therefore, more worthy of praise". The same held equally true for the slightly earlier 1963–64 The LIFE History of the United States series where each of the volumes was written by an American historian of contemporary renown. Because of their intrinsic transient nature in regard to validity, most science book series quickly became ephemera of their time only a short while later on, especially those concerning fields in which developments followed each other at breakneck speed, such as the ones covered in the late 1980s Understanding Computers and Voyage Through the Universe series which were already outdated before either series had even completed its run. Nor were their history series entirely exempt from this phenomenon either, especially the early 1960s ones, as new insights, archeological findings and new technology have the potential to completely rewrite history as understood in past decades. Mayan history for example, was featured in Time Life's early Great Ages of Man and The Emergence of Man series. However, historians were forced to largely rewrite Mayan history after their script had been fully unlocked and modern technology had revolutionized Mayan archeology in the 21st century, making the Time Life book entries on the subject obsolete and outdated. This even held true for their 1993 "The Magnificent Maya" outing (ISBN 0809498790) in their more recent Lost Civilizations series.

=== Zenith ===
Some other series were less highly regarded, especially the plethora of later output as the publisher moved away from soberly presented science and history toward sensationalism (that then with new age overtones imbued trend started in the mid-1980s with The Enchanted World and Mysteries of the Unknown series, followed in the early 1990s by the Library of Curious and Unusual Facts and True Crime series as prime sensationalist examples), less academically but more popularized written history (such as the Time Frame aka History of the World and Lost Civilizations series), the addition of more book series for children, while at the same time substantially stepping up their editorial focus on easier – and thus cheaper – to produce DIY-themed book series, they had already introduced in 1968 with their long-running 1968-77 Foods of the World cookbook series. The books though, regardless of their perceived quality, are easy to find at low prices on used-book markets, due to their being published in millions of copies. The same incidentally, also applied for the handful of later stand-alone book titles the company had published that were not part of a series, such as the 1995 "Eyewitness: 150 years of photojournalism" (ISBN 0848710223) title, but which were nonetheless usually conceived along the same thematic and format execution lines as the main book series had been. The big exception though, constituted the below-referenced (European) non-proprietary releases which are hard to find on used-book markets.

Nonetheless, Time-Life Books was still able to sell 20 million books in 1985, which, at a US$260 million turnover that year (after having suffered a disastrous sales plunge to a mere US$1,6 million two years earlier), made the subsidiary the largest single earning component of Time-Life, Inc. at that particular point in time – though it had to lay off over 200 employees (out of the total 1,243 employee pool of 1983, spread over ten worldwide offices) and shutter the Mexico City (Time-Life International de Mexico S.A. de C.V.) and Tokyo, Japan (Time Life International Publishing) operations to turn around the dramatic net operating losses suffered earlier that decade, but which also heralded the beginning of Time-Life Books' gradual withdrawal from the Far Eastern and Latin-American markets.

Of some series it was known that a particular series title enjoyed a much smaller print run than the other volumes in the series, resulting in the after-market value of that particular volume and/or the set as a whole increasing initially – though the general trend of waning interest in physical books, those of Time-Life included, has caused these prices to decrease again after the turn of the millennium. Examples include the fourteen-volume "40th Anniversary Edition" The Civil War: A Narrative and the eighteen-volume Voices of the Civil War series, where the volumes "Petersburg Siege to Bentonville" (ISBN 0783501129) and "Shenandoah 1864" (ISBN 078354717X) were the rarer ones respectively. The same applied for "The Rise of Cities" volume (ISBN 0705409910) from the twenty five-volume History of the World series, the UK variant of the home market Time Frame series where it had been a common volume. Nor was this phenomenon restricted to the English-language volume releases alone; of the "Gemstones" volume of the Planet Earth series, which had been a common one for the source release, is known that its "Edelgesteenten" Dutch-language counterpart (ISBN 906182494X) had been the rare one, still commanding premium prices on Dutch/Belgian used-book markets for its extreme scarcity.

Non-USA-specific topic series were habitually translated into other languages (French being the most predominant, due to Time Life's desire to have to bordering French-Canada served as well), and disseminated through local branches of Time-Life Books in the intended target markets. For several, usually smaller language areas, Time-Life regularly resorted to licensing out their publications to local publishers, as was for example the case with The Old West and The Enchanted World series. One major such licensee had been Barcelona, Spain-based Ediciones Folio, S.A. who for decades was signed for several Spanish-language series editions in Europe – for Latin America Time-Life Books resorted to (smaller) local publishers on an ad-hoc basis. The British, French, German and Dutch European edition releases though, were handled by Time-Life themselves through their in 1976 established subsidiary branch "Time-Life International (Nederland) B.V." (renamed to "Time-Life Books B.V." in the early-1980s and located at the time at Ottho Heldringstraat 5, 1066 AZ Amsterdam, Netherlands) as headquarters for mainland Europe and the British isles, which maintained administrative satellite offices in Paris (France), London (UK), and Munich (Germany), not by coincidence all located in the countries where Time-Life Books took on the publisher role itself. However, not rarely were these translated versions truncated for a variety of reasons. The Dutch language versions of History of the World (as "Time Life Wereld Geschiedenis"), The Epic of Flight (as "De Geschiedenis van de Luchtvaart"), The Enchanted World (as "Het Rijk der Fabelen"), and Mysteries of the Unknown (no Dutch series title) series, for example, were shy of four, seven, eight, and a whopping twenty-five volumes in translation respectively. Likewise, the German-language version of The Old West (as "Der Wilde Westen," and, even though American specific, translated nonetheless due to the continued and unabated popularity of the Western genre in Germany), disseminated through the Amsterdam branch as Time-Life Bücher, was shy of seven volumes just like the French-language Le Far West edition was.

Of at least one series is known that it had been initiated by a local branch and not by the American mother company; the 1986–89-book series Australians at War was initiated by the local Australasian subsidiary, "Time-Life Books (Australia) Pty Ltd." – located at 15 Blue Street, North Sydney, N.S.W. 2060, Australia at the time, according to the volume colophons of the series – and therefore relatively rare on American/European soil.

Prior to Time-Life, Inc.'s decision to relocate its headquarters from Chicago to Fairfax, Virginia in late 1986, it had long before that already decided to split off the book division onto its own entity in 1964, as above stated, in order to better differentiate between their book and the non-print media activities. Time-Life Books, Inc. had in the meantime moved out its New York City premises (where it was left behind by its mother company when they moved to Chicago in 1969) a decade earlier in early 1977 to the nearby 2000 Duke St. Alexandria, VA 22314 premises, to eventually become a nigh next-door neighbor of its mother company after 1986, and where it stayed until it was vacated in 2004. Contemporary reporters though, had a tough time keeping both premises apart, as they kept confusing one for the other.

Time-Life Books' DTC business model started to slump around 1991. Then-Deputy Editor Harris Andrews recalled how distraught he became when his 1991 Echoes of Glory mini-series project did not do well in DTC sales. However, once the mini-series was selected to become one of the very first for distribution through regular book store retail channels as well, sales picked up dramatically, thereby becoming a sales success after all. As a result, all Time-Life Books series, including the older ones that were still in print, were henceforth concurrently marketed through the regular book store channels as well, alongside the hitherto DTC-only channel – which incidentally, also encompassed Andrews' own 1996-98 Voices of the Civil War followup project. This however, did not apply to latter-day non-proprietary book series Time-Life was licensed to market, such as the 1999-2000 The Civil War: A Narrative – 40th Anniversary Edition commemorative series edition, or the European series licensed from Andromeda Oxford, Ltd. (see below)

In late-1998/early-1999 Time-Life Books was visited several times by reporters of the public broadcaster C-SPAN, who were on a mission to record the manner in which Time-Life went about the production of their book series. This in itself was a manifestation of how firmly Time-Life Books had by then become entrenched in the awareness of contemporary generations of Americans, not in the least due to the unrelenting television book series commercials Time-Life Books flooded the airwaves with in the 1980s and 1990s. A series of interviews were conducted by the C-SPAN reporters with several of the publisher's contemporary editors, besides them recording editing sessions these editors engaged in for some of their book series. The C-SPAN video registrations are currently safeguarded for posterity in its video archive. As Time-Life Books would cease to exist less than five years later, this turned out to be a timely initiative in hindsight.

=== Downfall ===
Time-Life ceased to publish books when it made its Time-Life Books, Inc. division defunct in January 2001, with any remaining vestiges of the book division immediately terminated for good upon the 31 December 2003 acquisition by Ripplewood/Direct Holdings L.L.C. The European "Time Life Books B.V." Amsterdam subsidiary branch and its three satellite offices elsewhere in Europe though, held out for a few years longer before they too were all closed down simultaneously in late August 2009 – which incidentally, coincided with the first filing for bankruptcy of Time-Life Inc.'s then-mother company, Reader's Digest Association – after which all remaining book publishing activities were suspended indefinitely.

Despite Ripplewood's stated intent to return to the book business, it had the already near-empty Alexandria office premises vacated in 2004 after its acquisition of Time Life, laying off what was left of the former Time-Life Books, Inc. staff and outsourcing remaining operations like customer service, order processing and distribution to third-party companies in Iowa, Pennsylvania and Kentucky instead. It did keep the Fairfax premises open however, as the seat of its subsidiary Direct Holdings Global during their 2003–13 ownership of Time Life. In their post-August 2009 haste to quit the book publishing business as quickly as possible, Direct Holdings decided to liquidate their leftover book stock by dumping it wholesale on specialized US and European remainder book stores, which included relatively new, late-1990s, produced series like The Civil War: A Narrative – 40th Anniversary Edition or Myths and Mankind. Subsequent owner Mosaic Media Investment Partners too, kept the Fairfax premises open as the non-print Time-Life seat until the altogether shuttering of the company in 2023.

The from 2004 onward unrelated Time [& Life], Inc./Time Warner however, continued until the late-2010s to publish similar print material for the home market through New York City-based Time Home Entertainment, Inc. (founded in the early 1990s), but as publisher of retail single-title books only instead of (direct marketed) book series, which they themselves had already scrubbed entirely in the preceding year, deeming them "too unprofitable". In essence, Time, Inc. emulated what former competitor Reader's Digest had been doing before them and what contemporary competitor National Geographic Books was still doing at that point in time, actually coming in more than one way full circle as they had done likewise themselves prior to their 1960 book series introduction. Somewhat confusingly, they even began to re-employ the brand logo of their former book subsidiary on their own single-title book publications again after 2013 (which in contrast to those of its former subsidiary were invariably executed in a budget-priced paperback format only as a cost saving measure), it – the brand name, not the subsidiary – had quietly bought back from Mosaic Media Investment Partners in January 2014. Having been renamed "Time Inc. Books" in 2015, the publisher shared its mother company's fate when it went ultimately defunct in 2018, bringing the era of Time-Life Books to a definitive end.

=== Proprietary book series publications ===
Series (Note: Most of the information on the book series can be ascertained through M. Legg's and M.L. Martin's websites, listed below. Series with their own Wikipedia entry have their series specific info and references noted there. Series with their own Wikipedia entry have their series specific info and references noted there. Time-Life Books incidentally, has never bothered to ever compile an official catalog/overview for historic reference sake of their book titles, be they series volumes or standalone titles, they had published over the decades, leaving it up to Time-Life Books aficionados like Legg and Martin to painstakingly do so for themselves and posterity—as their overview compilations are to date the only publicly accessible ones known to exist while exhibiting at least a semblance of completeness. Nor could Time-Life Inc. be bothered to do so for their other media, music and video, publications for which no publicly accessible (anywhere complete) historical overview records are even known to exist. This overview recording lack was surprising considering the effort that went into the upkeep of their customer database.)	Series Primary Run (Note: Time-Life Books first edition series run on English-speaking home market.)	No. of Volumes	References & Notes
American Country	1988–1991	20	"Time-Life: American Country". LibraryThing.com.
American Indians, The	1992–1996	24	"The American Indians". LibraryThing.com.
American Story, The	1996–1997	6	"Time-Life: The American Story". LibraryThing.com.
American Wilderness, The	1972–1977	27	"Time-Life: The American Wilderness". LibraryThing.com.
Art of Sewing, The	1973–1976	18	"Time-Life: The Art of Sewing". LibraryThing.com.
Australians at War	1986–1989	16	"Australians at War". LibraryThing.com.
Celebrate the Century	1998–2000	10	"Celebrate the Century". LibraryThing.com.
Civil War, The	1983–1987	28	Not the same as Time-Life's 14-volume 1999–2000 The Civil War: A Narrative 40th anniversary edition
Classics of Exploration (Note: This series concerns a deluxe, gilt-edged (faux) leather-bound facsimile rendition of memoirs written by contemporary participants and/or eyewitnesses in/of events covered by the series. Strictly speaking, these deluxe, oftentimes with embossed covers furnished series were not proprietary publications by Time-Life Books, but rather reprints of older works they acquired publication rights for. The same applied for the Time Reading Program series with this difference that its releases concerned mass market trade paperbacks only. Because third-party copyright owners are legion in these particular cases however, these series are for expedience sake included in this overview.)	1984–1987	21	
Classics of the Old West	1980–1984	31	
Classics of Transportation	1968	4	Sold as box set
Classics of World War II: The Secret War	1988–1993	24	
Collector's Library of the Civil War	1981–1985	30	"Collector's Library of the Civil War". LibraryThing.com.
Collector's Library of the Unknown	1990–1993	24	
Emergence of Man, The	1972–1974	21	"Time-Life: The Emergence of Man". LibraryThing.com.
Enchanted World, The (Note: This was one of the known series that had seen a (partial) British first or second edition printing during the first half of the 2000s. These UK-specific bookstore/retail-only versions were published by the London-based Caxton Publishing Group, Ltd. under a full license from the European Time-Life Books B.V. Amsterdam branch (as specified in the colophons of the UK volumes), which managed to stay in business a few years longer after the American Time Life Books, Inc. mother division had gone defunct in 2001 as a dedicated book publisher, and did therefore carry the Time Life logo on their covers. The UK reprints featured British spelling and came invariably with (redesigned) dust jackets with newly assigned ISBNs. These UK versions are relatively rare and therefore harder to come by on used-book markets—this is further specified in the respective individual series entry.)	1984–1987	21	
Echoes of Glory	1991	3	Sold as box set
Encyclopedia of Collectibles, The	1978–1980	16	OCLC 3697722
Epic of Flight, The	1980–1983	23	"Time-Life: Epic of Flight". LibraryThing.com.
Family Library	1969–1975	4	
Fitness, Health, and Nutrition	1987–1989	20	
Fix It Yourself	1987–1991	26	
Foods of the World	1968–1977	27	
Good Cook, The	1978–1980	28	Each volume consisted of the main text book and a spiral bound recipe/technique book making the total count 56 tomes
Great Ages of Man	1965–1968	21	"Great Ages of Man". PublishingHistory.com.
Great Cities, The	1972–1981	25	"Time-Life: The Great Cities". LibraryThing.com.
Healthy Home Cooking	1986–1989	25	
History Makers	2000	4	
Home Repair and Improvement	1977–1989	37	"Home Repair and Improvement". LibraryThing.com.
How Things Work	1990–1991	14	OCLC 28050169
Human Behavior	1974–1978	15	"Human Behavior". LibraryThing.com.
I Love Math!	1992–1993	12	"I Love Math". LibraryThing.com.
Illustrated Library of Nature	1980–1984	24	Revised reprint of the 24 volumes of the LIFE Nature Library, minus the Index
Kodak Library of Creative Photography, The	1983–1985	18	"The Kodak Library of Creative Photography". LibraryThing.com.
Library of Curious and Unusual Facts	1990–1993	18	"Library of Curious and Unusual Facts". LibraryThing.com.
Library of Health	1981–1982	11	"Library of Health". LibraryThing.com.
Library of Nations	1984–1987	20	"Time-Life: Library of Nations". LibraryThing.com.
LIFE History of the United States, The	1963–1964	12	
LIFE Library of Photography	1970–1972	19	"LIFE Library of Photography". LibraryThing.com.
LIFE Nature Library	1963–1965	25	"LIFE Nature Library". PublishingHistory.com.
LIFE Science Library	1963–1967	26	"LIFE Science Library". PublishingHistory.com.
LIFE World Library	1960–1967	34	Started by Time, Inc. before the book subsidiary became operational
LIFE Young Readers Library	1968–1979	12	Also titled the Young Readers Library, the LIFE Young Readers Nature Library, or the Young Readers Nature Library; 12 volumes from the LIFE Nature Library adapted for younger readers, sometimes with updates or additions
Little People, Big Books	1989–1990	18	"Little People Big Books". LibraryThing.com.
Lost Civilizations	1992–1995	24	"Time-Life: Lost Civilizations". LibraryThing.com.
Mysteries of the Unknown	1987–1992	33	
Myth and Mankind	1996–1999	20	"Myth and Mankind". LibraryThing.com.
Our American Century	1997–2000	20	"Our American Century". LibraryThing.com.
Native American Voices	1991–1993	6 (?)	"Native American Voices". SomethingUnderTheBed.com.; being one of the most obscure series by Time-Life Books, the exact extent of this series is unknown.
Nature Company Discoveries Library, The	1995–2001	24	"Nature Company Discoveries Library". WorldCat.org.
New Face of War, The	1990–1992	9	"Time-Life: The New Face of War". LibraryThing.com.
Old West, The	1973–1980	27	
Planet Earth	1982–1985	18	"Planet Earth". LibraryThing.com.
Seafarers, The	1978–1981	22	"Time-Life: The Seafarers". LibraryThing.com.
Third Reich, The	1988–1991	21	
This Fabulous Century	1969–1970	8	OCLC 71371636
Time Frame aka History of the World	1987–1991	25	"Time Frame". LibraryThing.com.
Time Life Complete Gardener	1995–1996	15	
Time-Life Early Learning Program	1990–1993	17	"Early Learning Program". LibraryThing.com.
Time–Life Encyclopedia of Gardening, The	1971–1981	31	"Time-Life Encyclopedia of Gardening". LibraryThing.com.
Time–Life Library of America	1967–1969	13	"Time-Life Library of America". PublishingHistory.com.
Time-Life Library of Art	1966–1970	28	"Time-Life Library of Art". LibraryThing.org.
Time–Life Library of Boating, The	1975–1977	13	"Time-Life: Library of Boating". LibraryThing.com.
Time Life Student Library	1997–2000	11	"Time-Life Student Library". LibraryThing.com.
Time Reading Program	1962–1966	109	The second, and last known Time Life Books book series not released in hardcover, but rather in paperback
True Crime	1992–1994	9	"True Crime". LibraryThing.com.
Understanding Computers	1988–1992	24	"Understanding Computers". LibraryThing.com.
Voices of the Civil War	1995–1998	18	
Voices of Triumph	1993–1994	3	
Voyage Through the Universe	1988–1990	20	"Voyage Through the Universe". LibraryThing.com.
What Life Was Like	1997–2000	19	similar in concept and format execution to the Time Frame series
Wild, Wild World of Animals	1976–1978	22	Released as a "Time-Life Films" book series
Wings of War	1989–1995	26	
World War II	1976–1983	39	
World's Wild Places, The	1973–1977	13	"Time-Life: The World's Wild Places". LibraryThing.com.; identically executed complementary series of The American Wilderness launched a year earlier, which had led to much confusion and misidentification—even on the LibraryThing.com website.

=== Non-proprietary book series publications ===
While the vast majority of published book series were conceived, initiated and produced by Time Life itself, which included the Australian branch initiated Australian at War series, the company also (re)issued on occasion series in similar vein they were either especially commissioned for by outside parties, or as licensee of series that were originally conceived, produced and/or released by third-party publishers elsewhere, typically for release on the US home market, usually, but not always, under its own imprint. English-language versions of British Commonwealth-pedigree series were published by a variety of publishers for the various English-speaking territories in the world, with the regional Time-Life Books B.V. Amsterdam subsidiary commonly designated for Europe and the British Isles, as mentioned in the colophons of the individual volumes. The Amsterdam subsidiary also took care of the potential other-language editions in Europe. These European Time Life versions are far less common, if not outright rare, in used-book markets—the North American ones in particular—than Time Life's own proprietary releases are. The non-proprietary US home market releases on the other hand, are rare on European soil. Licensed series published under the Time-Life Books brand had the licensors dutifully mentioned in the book colophons.

Series (Note: Most of the information on the book series can be ascertained through M. Legg's and M.L. Martin's websites, listed below. Series with their own Wikipedia entry have their series specific info and references noted there.)	Series Primary Run (Note: Time-Life Books first edition series run on English-speaking home market.)	No. of Volumes	References & Notes
Cultural Atlas of the World (An Equinox Book) aka World Atlas of Civilisation	1991-96	20	"Cultural Atlas series". PublishingHistory.com.; series licensed from Andromeda Oxford Ltd, Oxfordshire, England whose authors were scholars affiliated with Oxford University Press, the publication arm of the eponymous university. This British series was conceived in the second half of the 1980s and dealt with the history and culture of territories and civilizations, predominantly related in maps. It was in Time-Life's 1992 direct promo mailings that the series was solicited as the World Atlas of Civilisation (notice British spelling) series. Phaidon Press, alongside at least eight others, had been part of the original 1980s array of licensed series publishers for the English, French, and German-language territories, before Time-Life Books, B.V. started its UK reprint run in 1991, which they followed up with their 1994–98 French-language Atlas des Civilisations series reprint edition, though delegating the actual printing to French publisher Éditions Du Fanal.
Child's First Library of Learning, A	1987-96	31	"A Child's First Library of Learning". LibraryThing.com.; primary school educational book series release based on a Japanese series published by Gakken. The series was also released in Europe by Time-Lime Books B.V. in the UK, Germany and the Netherlands/Flanders, in the latter two cases as the German-language "Time Life Kinderbibliothek".) and Dutch-language "Time Life Kinderbibliotheek". versions respectively.
Child's First Library of Values, A	1996-98	15	"Child's first library of values". WorldCat.org.; preschool educational storybook series release based on a Japanese series also originally published by Gakken. A Far-Eastern English-language version is known to have been released by Time-Life Asia, Hong Kong.
Civil War: A Narrative – 40th Anniversary Edition, The	1999-2000	14	"The Civil War: A Narrative". LibraryThing.com.; edited home market commemorative re-release of Shelby Foote's original 1958–74 three-volume release from Random House.
Deutschen Länder, Die	1991-94	20	"Edition die Deutschen Länder". World.Cat.org.; German-language only series detailing the individual states of Germany. Released by Time-Life Books B.V. as a commissioned publisher, it was an inaugural "Sonder Ausgabe" (="special edition") release of the soon thereafter mass market release under the same title by Bucher Verlag, München, who had been the ones that had commissioned Time-Life for the preview edition in the first place.
Illustrated Library of the Earth, The	1993-96	6	Licensed from Weldon Owen Pty Ltd, Australia – essentially a deluxe and updated, or addendum version of the Planet Earth Series. Aside from the English-language edition, Time-Life Amsterdam. had also a French-language European edition published as the Encyclopédie de la terre series. The small series was in the US released by Rodale Press, whereas Reader's Digest Press had been the designated publisher for Australasia. It has also seen translated foreign editions from other local third-party publishers, such as the Zuid-Hollandsche Uitgeversmaatschappij for the Netherlands/Flanders and Egmont Polska for Poland.
MHQ, The Quarterly Journal of Military History	1992-2001	45 (under Time-Life's auspices)	Launched in the autumn of 1988 the self explanatory publication was technically a magazine series, but was initially executed as a series of deluxe hardcover quarterlies, in format execution reminiscent of the Time Life publications and primarily intended for the American home market. Four years later, original publisher MHQ, Inc. therefore sought out the services of Time-Life Books, Inc. for the various back office activities in order to broaden the potential customer reach of the fledgling magazine, specifically where marketing (the promotional solicitation mailings in particular), subscription and distribution services were concerned, making the company essentially a co-publisher. After Time-Life Books, Inc. had gone defunct in January 2001, the publication went it alone again under new ownership and eventually transitioned into an actual magazine format, and was as of 2024 still being published.
Photographic History of the Civil War, The	2000-01	2	A facsimile reprint edition of the original 1911 Review of Reviews Co. series, intended as a commemorative 90th anniversary release. Slated to become a ten-volume series, just like the original, its release only started in the waning days of Time-Life Books, Inc. and the division's ultimate demise as a dedicated book publisher eventually cut the intended series release short.
System Earth (An Equinox Book)	1991-92	6	Geography in the broadest sense series. Like the later World Atlas of Civilisation series, neither concept nor contents of the series were conceived by Time-Life, but rather by the aforementioned Andromeda Oxford Ltd, drawing upon their author pool of affiliated Oxford University academics, but unlike the World Atlas of Civilisation series Time-Life Books B.V. was from the start earmarked as the series' inaugural publisher albeit merely as a commissioned publisher, only charged with the physical book production and associated marketing and distribution services of the book series for Europe. In a way this and the subsequent World Atlas of Civilisation series became an attempt by the (European branch) publisher to return to the more scholarly approach for their series it had started out with and were renowned for from the 1960s until the mid-1980s. Slated to become a much larger series, Time-Life solicited at least five more series titles in their 1991 direct promo mailing beyond the six that they actually released ultimately, and those in Europe only. Besides the English-language edition, Time-Life Books B.V. also released the with Dutch ISBNs endowed System Erde German-language edition alongside the French-language L'Homme et son universe edition. After Time-Life Books had withdrawn from the publication effort, Oxford University Press (New York), which had concurrently started out with the as The Illustrated Encyclopedia of World Geography entitled US series release (ISBN 019521059X), continued the series publication and had eleven titles published before they too discontinued the series in 1993, with Time-Life having three titles published that Oxford University Press had not.
Understanding Science and Nature(aka Illustrated World of Science and Illustrated Encyclopedia of Science and Nature)	1989-95	18	"Understanding Science and Nature". LibraryThing.com.; home market release based on a Japanese series of books by Gakken.
Vietnam Experience, The	1981-88	25	"The Vietnam Experience: The Original Series". VietnamExperience.com.; series dealing with the Vietnam War, with emphasis on America's involvement in that conflict. While an original home market publication by the then-three year old Boston Publishing Company, Time-Life Books, Inc. served as a de facto co-publisher as it took on the subscription, distribution, and promotional services for the novice publisher through mailings and television ads – several of which currently posted on "YouTube". In format execution, the books in the series greatly resembled the volumes Time-Life produced for its own series, making the selection of Time-Life as co-publisher almost a given for Boston Publishing.
Williams Sonoma Cooking	1980s-1990s	95	Home market cookbook releases, with the individual book titles spread over nine separate series, all licensed from Weldon Owen Pty Ltd, Australia

== Time Life Music ==
Time Life added music in 1967, selling box sets and collections through Time-Life Records as a division subordinated under Time-Life Books, Inc. The division changed its name to Time Life Music after music cassette tapes were added to its array of releases, with its European iterations, including the German Time Life Musik label, subordinated under the Amsterdam "Time-Life Books BV" subsidiary branch. During the 1960s and 1970s, the collections released by Time–Life Records catered to an adult audience, with genres including classical, jazz, swing and orchestral music; and the music of operas and Broadway theatre. On occasion, Time Life offered popular music (generally pre-1955 music, as opposed to pop and rock music airing on contemporary hit radio stations in the United States at the time) in box-sets. Although there were television advertisements, Time Life advertised most of these sets in magazines, specialty catalogs and direct mail, just like it did with their book series.

In the early 1980s, Time Life began branching out, offering a series of albums focusing on country music. The first series was 1981's "Country Music," with volumes focusing on a particular artist and featuring eight or nine tracks per album. Twenty volumes were issued, with many of country's greatest artists of the time (Charley Pride was the first artist featured) getting their own album. But until the mid-1980s, Time Life did not feature a rock music-intensive series for customers, preferring to cater to older adults with conservative music tastes.

=== Pop music enters the picture ===
Time Life's first successful foray into rock music came in 1986, with a series called "The Rock 'n' Roll Era." Each volume in that series—like similar series that followed—focused on a particular year (in this case, 1955 through 1964—the early, pre-Beatles years of rock music), a stylistic trend or particular artist influential in rock music. Each volume had 22 tracks, and was said to contain the original hit recording by the original artist (although this wasn't always true on early pressings of the early albums in the series). The songs themselves represented the most important and popular songs from the period or subject featured. An essay published by Both Sides Now Publications noted that Time-Life's move into rock music came at a time when much of the adult audience Time-Life catered to grew up during the rock-and-roll era and, as such, the new series was consistent with its goal of catering to an adult audience.

"The Rock 'n' Roll Era" series was a big success, and by the time the final volume was issued in the early 1990s, more than 50 different volumes (including two Christmas albums) had been released. This paved the way for more country and pop music-intensive series, including "Country USA," "Classic Rock," "Sounds of the Seventies," "Sounds of the Eighties," "Your Hit Parade" (a series featuring popular music of the 1940s through early 1960s) and "Super Hits." Like the earlier series, each volume issued had its own paperback booklet containing liner notes and information about the songs, with the addition of placement on various Billboard magazine charts.

Like the earlier box-sets featuring other musical styles and genres, the country and pop music series were advertised in magazines, catalogs and direct mail. By this time though, and like its Time-Life Books sibling division, most of these collections were advertised on television as well, vigorously so in effect. There was a difference though; did Time Life Books contend itself with the standard one-to-two minute long commercials, Time Life Music also made much more use of half hour commercials, which they poured in the guise of documentaries, the so-called "infomercials", and not rarely presented by artists whose music was presented on the underlying release. The television advertisements used slogans (e.g., "Relive your high school days ..."), clips of songs included in each volume (along with a scrolling list of other titles), a commercial spokesman (usually a performer or legendary disc jockey relevant to a given series, such as Rick Dees for a 1970s-intensive collection and Ralph Emery for a country music series) and testimonials from customers attesting to the quality and value of the albums, to pitch a given series. Key selling points of these collections are that each track was digitally transferred to the desired format using the original master recordings, as opposed to being "re-records"; and that the most popular and requested songs by customers could be found in a single collection (as opposed to a customer having to purchase many albums to obtain just a few desired tracks).

Customers were given a choice of which format they wanted their box set: either vinyl albums (through 1990), 8-track or cassette tape, or compact disc; today's box sets are offered only as compact discs.

While most of Time Life's box-sets and releases were critically hailed, there were also some minor faults pointed out by critics. For instance, several early pressings of the early volumes in "The Rock'n'Roll Era" series contained stereo re-recordings of the original hits (something that would be corrected on later pressings, either with the correct original recording or a replacement track). Sometimes, the most popular songs of a given time period were omitted, frequently due to licensing issues. Examples included The Beatles and The Rolling Stones for the Classic Rock and "Super Hits"/"AM Gold" series;, Garth Brooks and Shania Twain on various country music series;, and Prince, Madonna, Whitney Houston, Guns N' Roses, Bon Jovi, Janet Jackson and Michael Jackson on the main Sounds of the Eighties series.

Time Life Music too, was included in the December 31, 2003 sale of Time Life, Inc. to Direct Holdings Global, the former Time Warner owners having cited the "earnings drag of the direct-marketing music division" caused by the "challenging publishing environment where sales have suffered from a lack of hits and the downturn in the music business" as the reason to have the once highly successful division included in the sale as well.

Through 2010, several different series Time Life had offered were available on a subscription basis, either by calling a 1-800 number or sending a completed postcard-sized card and payment to Time Life. Purportedly, the customer would get a specific volume (as advertised on TV or in a magazine) first, before receiving a new volume roughly every other month (on the format of their choice); customers and had the option of keeping just the volumes they wanted. In time, each volume was also offered for individual sale.

Several of the series – especially the pop, rock, country and rhythm and blues series – had retail versions for sale, released after the entire series was issued. Typically, these were sold at discount stores, often grouped in three-CD sets of 12 tracks each and having the most popular of the series' tracks, and cover artwork and naming loosely based on the subscription/catalog-exclusive titles. Additionally, the "Classic Country" series had special 15-track single-CD versions of several of its volumes issued for retail sale (in addition to budget 3-CD sets).

As of March 2023, Time Life began shutting down its DTC CD and DVD music service. Until May 2024, the company's website only listed a toll-free number for assistance and the Time-Life infomercial channel has been pulled from all cable services, before it went permanently dark altogether.

=== Saguaro Road Records ===
In 2008, Reader's Digest Association (RDA) launched Saguaro Roads Records, Inc. as an in-house music recording label, and resorted it under Time Life due to its 2007 subordination under RDA by their then-owner Ripplewood.

Under the combined "Time Life/Saguaro Roads Records" label, albums have been released with Adam Hood, Blind Boys of Alabama, Bo Bice, Brandy and Ray J, Collin Raye, Dion, Edwin McCain, Hank Williams (estate), Jim Brickman, Joan Osborne, Lonestar, Marc Cohn, Mark Chesnutt, Patty Loveless, Rebecca Lynn Howard, Tanya Tucker, The Grascals, Angie Stone, Waylon Jennings and Don McLean.

Since its launch Saguaro Roads Records has had garnered seven Grammy nominations for its releases. These included two 2009 releases from The Blind Boys of Alabama whose Down in New Orleans album won a Grammy Award for Best Traditional Gospel Album complemented with a Grammy Lifetime Achievement Award for their Live in New Orleans video registration, Patti LuPone's Gypsy: The 2008 Broadway Cast Recording which was nominated for a Grammy Award for Best Musical Theater Album that year, Hank Williams: The Complete Mother's Best Recordings which was nominated for the Grammy Award for Best Historical Album in 2011, Patty Loveless's Mountain Soul II which won a Grammy Award for Best Bluegrass Album also in 2011, Joan Osborne's Bring it on Home which was nominated for a Grammy Award for Best Blues Album in 2013, and The Beatles' "First Recordings: 50th Anniversary Edition" which was nominated for a Grammy Award for Best Album Notes in the same year.

Saguaro Roads Records though, was excluded from the deal when RDA had to sell Time Life to Mosaic Media Investment Partners in 2013, but has remained dormant ever since.

=== List of series ===
The following list shows many of the collections the company has released, but is by no means exhaustive.

- '60s, The
- '60s Country
- '60s Music Revolution
- '60s Gold (discontinued)
- '70s Collection, The (discontinued)
- '70s Country
- '70s Music Explosion (discontinued)
- '80's Collection, The (discontinued)
- '80's Music Explosion (discontinued)
- '90's Collection, The (discontinued)
- 100 Christmas Songs for Kids
- 100 Classics for Kids
- 100 Classics for Relaxation
- 100 Kids Songs
- 100 Masterpieces
- 100 Piano Masterpieces
- 101 Sing a Longs for Kids
- American Gold #1 Hits
- AM Gold (2021)
- AM Gold (discontinued; was first issued as "Super Hits")
- Beethoven Collection, The
- Best of Soft Rock
- Big Bands
- Billboard #1 Hits of the '70's
- Blues Legends (discontinued)
- Blues Masters (discontinued)
- Bobby Jones Presents Ultimate Gospel
- Body and Soul
- Body Talk (discontinued)
- British Invasion, The
- Classic Bluegrass (discontinued)
- Classic Country (2022)
- Classic Country
- Classic Drive (discontinued)
- Classic Jazz
- Classic Love Songs of the '60's
- Classic Radio Hits (discontinued)
- Classic Rock (discontinued, was a collection of mid- to late-1960s music)
- Classic Rhythm and Blues
- Classic Soft Rock
- Classic Soul Ballads
- Classic Love Songs of Rock 'n' Roll (2016)
- Classic Love Songs of Rock 'n' Roll (discontinued)
- Classical Power
- Concerts of Great Music, The, AKA Story of Great Music Concerts, The 11 LP (5) volumes, 1966–68, (discontinued)
- Contemporary Country (discontinued)
- Country Jukebox
- Country Music Explosion
- Country Music Hall of Fame Presents Classic Country
- Country Music of Your Life
- Country USA (2011)
- Country USA (discontinued)
- Country's Got Heart
- Def Comedy Jam
- Dick Clark's Jukebox Gems
- Disco Fever (discontinued)
- Disney Christmas Collection
- Disney's Greatest
- Easy '80's
- Easy Listening Classics
- Edge of the '80's (discontinued)
- Emotion Collection, The (discontinued)
- Fabulous Fifties, The (discontinued)
- Faith, Hope & Country
- Feel Good Rock
- Flower Power
- Folk Years, The (discontinued)
- Forever '60's
- Forever '70's
- Forever Soul
- Giants of Jazz (discontinued)
- Girl Groups
- Glory Days of Rock 'n' Roll (discontinued)
- Great American Songbook
- God Bless the USA
- Gold and Platinum: The Ultimate Rock Collection (discontinued)
- Golden Age of Country
- Golden Age of Pop
- Great Composers
- Great Men of Music
- Greatest Love Songs of the '60's
- Greatest Love Songs of the '70's
- Grooves (discontinued)
- Guitar Rock (discontinued)
- Hard & Heavy (discontinued)
- Heart of Rock 'n' Roll, The (discontinued)
- Heart of Classic Rock, The
- History of Rock 'n' Roll, The (discontinued)
- I Can Only Imagine Platinum
- Instrumental Favorites
- It All Started with Doo Wop (discontinued)
- Jukebox Memories
- Kingston Trio
- Lifetime of Country Romance
- Lifetime of Romance
- Legendary Singers
- Legendary Voices
- Legends of Country
- Legends: The Ultimate Rock Collection (discontinued)
- Living the Blues (discontinued)
- Living the Gospel (discontinued)
- Magic of Love (discontinued)
- Malt Shop Memories
- Midnight Soul
- Modern Rock Dance
- Modern Rock (discontinued)
- Motown Collection, The
- Mozart Collection, The
- Music of Your Life
- Mysteries of the Unknown
- Opry Video Classics
- Party Rock
- Pop Goes the '70's
- Pop Memories of the '60's
- Pop Revolution (discontinued)
- Power of Love
- Power of Love, The (1996) (discontinued)
- Prom Night
- Pure Rhythm and Blues
- Quiet Storm
- Raunchy Blues
- Rhythm & Blues
- Rhythm+Grooves (discontinued)
- Rock and Roll Hall of Fame 25th Anniversary Concert
- Rock Collection, The (discontinued)
- Rock & Romance
- The Rock 'n' Roll Era (discontinued)
- Rock 'n' Roll Era (2013)
- Rock 'n' Roll: Legendary Years (discontinued)
- Romancing the '60's
- Romancing the '70's
- Romantically Yours
- Secret Love
- Singers & Songwriters US Version
- Singers & Songwriters Europe Version
- Smooth Soul
- Sock Hop Collection, The
- Solid Gold Soul US Version (discontinued)
- Solid Gold Soul Europe Version (discontinued)
- Songs 4 Ever (discontinued)
- Songs 4 Life (discontinued)
- Songs 4 Worship Country
- Songs 4 Worship
- Songs For Lovers (discontinued)
- Soul of The '60's
- Soul of The '70's
- Soul Story (discontinued)
- Soul Superstars of the '70's
- Soulful Christmas
- Sounds of The '70's (discontinued)
- Sounds of the '80's
- Sounds of the Seventies
- Sounds of The Sixties (discontinued)
- Sounds of the Seventies (discontinued)
- Sounds of the Eighties (discontinued)
- Sounds of the Nineties (discontinued)
- Spirit of the '60's (discontinued)
- Story of Great Music, The, 11 LP (4) volumes, 1966–68, (discontinued)
- Story of Great Music Concerts, The, AKA Concerts of Great Music, The 11 LP (5) volumes, 1966–68, (discontinued)
- Summer Breeze Collection, The
- Superhits
- Superstars of Country (discontinued)
- Superstars of the '80's
- Sweet Soul of the '70's (discontinued)
- Teen Years, The
- Timeless Music Collection, The (discontinued)
- Time Life Loves the '80's
- To the Moon, a 6-record set: a documentary with accompanying book about the early space program, the space race, the missions to the Moon and the first Moon landing, published soon after Apollo 11 completed its mission to the Moon. (discontinued)
- Treasury of Christmas
- Ultimate Love Songs
- Ultimate Oldies but Goodies Collection, The (discontinued)
- Ultimate Radio Disney Collection
- Ultimate Rock Ballads
- Ultimate Seventies (discontinued)
- Uptown Saturday Night (discontinued)
- We Love the Nightlife
- What Life was Like
- World of the Supernatural
- Woodstock Collection, The
- Worship Together
- Your Hit Parade (discontinued)
- You So Crazy

== Time Life Video ==
Time Life's video business has been growing quickly since 2000. Starting out at the dawn of the videotape era in 1978, the division began with (re-)issuing such documentary series as The World at War (1973–74), The Trials of Life (1990),The Civil War (1990), The Wild West (1993), The Nazis: A Warning from History (1997), and Growing Up Wild (1992–93). As evidenced by the first, second and penultimate titles, Time Life Video had over its lifespan been the distributor of choice of British broadcasters, the BBC in particular, for the dissemination of their documentaries on home video formats in the US market. Time Life subsequently branched out into nostalgic television shows as well at more recent times, having been able to leverage their already music industry knowledge and contacts to release television shows previously held back because of expensive music rights clearances. Their collections were known for having extensive bonus features, liner notes and packaging. Television show releases from Time Life include:

- America A Look Back
- Animal Alphabet & Numbers
- Apocalypse: The Second World War
- Baby's First Impressions
- Barney & Friends (season 1)
- The Beginner's Bible
- The Best of Beavis and Butt-Head (Various Episodes from 1993 - 1997)
- The Benny Hill Show
- The Jack Benny Program (50 episodes, plus 10 specials and 7 guest star appearances)
- The Best of George Carlin (15 specials, plus 30 other guest appearances)
- The Best of Ren & Stimpy
- The Big Comfy Couch
- The Ultimate Carol Burnett Show Collection (50 Episodes, plus the special Carol + 2 and the 1972 version of Once Upon a Mattress)
- Cedarmont Kids
- Childs Video Christmas (Rudolph the Red-Nosed Reindeer, Santa Claus Is Comin' to Town and Frosty the Snowman)
- China Beach (complete series)
- The Clint Eastwood Collection
- CMA Awards Live (performance compilations)
- Dallas (seasons 1 to 4)
- The Best of Def Comedy Jam
- Dolly: The Ultimate Collection (select episodes of The Porter Wagoner Show, the 1976 and 1987 incarnations of the Dolly variety show, Crook & Chase and other assorted Dolly Parton appearances)
- Fat Albert
- Get Smart (complete series)
- The Real Ghostbusters (complete series)
- Great Films of the Bible
- Growing Up Wild
- The Hee Haw Collection (select episodes and sketches)
- The Jackie Gleason Show (color episodes)
- The John Wayne Collection "Rio Bravo" (1959), "Sands of Iwo Jima" (1949), "Stagecoach" (1939), "The Cowboys" (1972), "The Green Berets" (1968) and "The Quiet Man" (1952),
- Looney Tunes: Library
- Lucy: The Ultimate 12 DVD Collection (76 episodes spanning I Love Lucy, The Lucy–Desi Comedy Hour, The Lucy Show, Here's Lucy and Life with Lucy)
- Mama's Family (complete series)
- The Man from U.N.C.L.E. (complete series)
- The Dean Martin Celebrity Roast (complete series)
- The Dean Martin Variety Show (select sketches and episodes, by agreement with NBCUniversal and the estate of Greg Garrison)
- The Mayberry Collection (select episodes from The Andy Griffith Show, Gomer Pyle, USMC and Mayberry R.F.D., plus the reunion movie Return to Mayberry and the backdoor pilot from The Danny Thomas Show)
- Midway
- Mighty Morphin Power Rangers
- Motown 25
- NOVA (1974–85)
- Power Rangers: From Mighty Morphin' to Lost Galaxy (seasons 1 to 7)
- The Ultimate Richard Pryor Collection: Uncensored (26 hours, spanning his television specials, The Richard Pryor Show and Pryor's Place)
- Rowan & Martin's Laugh-In (40 episodes)
- Saturday Night Live
- Sesame Street
- Thomas & Friends
- Tales From The Crypt
- The Best of The Muppet Show (complete series), produced by Jim Henson Home Entertainment
- The Six Million Dollar Man (complete series)
- The Red Skelton Show
- The Smothers Brothers Comedy Hour (Season 3)
- I Got You Babe - The Best of Sonny & Cher/The Best of Cher (selected episodes from The Sonny & Cher Comedy Hour, Cher, The Sonny & Cher Show from the '70s, as well as Cher... Special and Cher and Other Fantasies specials)
- The Best of Soul Train (Highlights from the '70s)
- The Tonight Show Starring Johnny Carson: Johnny and Friends (licensed from Carson Productions)
- The Wonder Years (complete series)
- Trials of Life Video Offer
- Robin Williams: Comic Genius (five HBO specials and compilation of other TV appearances)
- Zoo Life with Jack Hanna

== See also ==
- List of record labels
- Columbia House
