= The Civil War (book series) =

Series of books published by Time Life

- Edited by: Thomas H. Flaherty (Series Director), Harris J. Andrews (Researcher), et al.
- Illustrator: Photographers of the American Civil War, et al.
- Cover artist: various
- Country: Alexandria, Virginia, USA
- Language: en-us
- Genre: History
- Publisher: Time-Life Books. Inc.
- Published: 1983-87
- Media type: print
- No. of books: 28
- OCLC: 20080930

The Civil War book series chronicles in great detail the American Civil War. Published by Time-Life Books, the 28-volume series was sequentially released in the US and Canada between 1983 and 1987 as bi-monthly direct-to-consumer (DTC) installments to series subscribers. Some titles focused on a specific topic, such as the blockade, and spies, but most volumes concentrated on the battles and campaigns, presented in chronological order.

== Release overview ==
Each volume in the series, including the "Master Index", was 176 pages in length, heavily illustrated and with pictorial essays on specific topics within each volume and came standard without a dust jacket. Executed in hardcover, each volume was bound in silvery-gray padded faux leather, the cover endowed with in deep blue printed text imprints, and heavily embossed with Civil War symbology with an oval shaped illustration glued on.

Like their book series had been in the 1960s and 1970s most volumes were written by historians and/or experts of repute on the subject matter at hand, and for which Time-Life Books had hitherto been renowned. However, there were also three (four if one is to include volume 28, the "Master Index") volumes written by committee, "The Editors of Time-Life Books", namely volumes 3, 8 and 18 as explained by series researcher Harris Andrews in a December 1998 C-SPAN interview, "[w]e frequently would hire modern historians as consultants on the volume to give us a guide to speed up our [editing] process so that we knew what we could cut away, material that we didn't necessarily want to go to." While having already employed the content creation format on an occasional basis for some outings in earlier book series, Time-Life Books would henceforth employ this format as the more regular content creation template for all their subsequent book series afterwards, which notably included the later below specified Voices of the Civil War complementary series as well. Military historian Colonel John R. Elting in particular was a Time-Life Books consulting regular as he had fulfilled that function for several outings in the publisher's military history series, such as the World War II and The Third Reich series.

Because of it being a USA-specific topic, no international editions of the main series and/or the hereafter mentioned spin-offs are known to have been published in translation by either Time-Life itself or licensed others. Still, interested parties in other language territories were offered the opportunity to acquire the original American version via mail through their nearest Time-Life Books subsidiary, as was commonplace for the company at the time, typically by taking out a series subscription.

Volume titles of The Civil War
Title	Authors/Consultants	Volume	Year published	ISBN (Note: As was customary for Time-Life Books, each of the US first-print series volumes were furbished with two ISBNs (the second one usually eight numbers higher), with the lower number indicating the retail/Direct-to-Customer (DTC) copies whereas the higher ones indicate the library binding ("lib. bdg.") copies as specified in the book colophons – which remained adhered to for later with higher newly assigned ISBNs endowed revised editions as well, if there had been any. Listed in the table are the lower, first-print retail copy ISBNs.)
Brother Against Brother - The War Begins	William C. Davis	01	1983	ISBN 0809447002
First Blood - Fort Sumter to Bull Run	William C. Davis	02	1983	ISBN 0809447045
The Blockade - Runners and Raiders	John R. Elting, James J. Robertson, William A. Frassatino, Les Jensen, Michael McAffee, Clark G. Reynolds, James P. Shenton	03	1983	ISBN 0809447088
The Road to Shiloh - Early Battles in the West	David Nevin	04	1983	ISBN 0809447126
Forward to Richmond - McClellan's Peninsular Campaign	Ronald H. Bailey	05	1983	ISBN 0809447207
Decoying the Yanks - Jackson's Valley Campaign	Champ Clark	06	1984	ISBN 080944724X
Confederate Ordeal - The Southern Home Front	Steve A. Channing	07	1984	ISBN 0809447282
Lee Takes Command - From Seven Days to Second Bull Run	John R. Elting, William A. Frassatino, Les Jenson, Michael McAffee, James P. Shenton	08	1984	ISBN 0809448041
The Coastal War - Chesapeake Bay to Rio Grande	Peter M. Chaitin	09	1984	ISBN 0809447320
Tenting Tonight - The Soldier's Life	James I. Robertson Jr.	10	1984	ISBN 0809447363
The Bloodiest Day - The Battle of Antietam	Ronald H. Bailey	11	1984	ISBN 0809447401
War on the Mississippi - Grant's Vicksburg Campaign	Jerry Korn	12	1985	ISBN 0809447444
Rebels Resurgent - Fredericksburg to Chancellorsville	William K. Goolrick	13	1985	ISBN 0809447487
Twenty Million Yankees - The Northern Home Front	Donald Dale Jackson	14	1985	ISBN 0809447525
Gettysburg - The Confederate High Tide	Champ Clark	15	1985	ISBN 0809447568
The Struggle for Tennessee - Tupelo to Stones River	James Street Jr.	16	1985	ISBN 0809447606
The Fight For Chattanooga - Chickamauga to Missionary Ridge	Jerry Korn	17	1985	ISBN 0809448165
Spies, Scouts and Raiders - Irregular Operations	John R. Elting, William A. Frassatino, Les Jenson, Michael McAffee	18	1985	ISBN 0809447169
Battles For Atlanta - Sherman Moves East	Ronald H. Bailey	19	1985	ISBN 0809447738
The Killing Ground - Wilderness to Cold Harbor	Gregory Jaynes	20	1986	ISBN 0809447681
Sherman's March - Atlanta to the Sea	David Nevin	21	1986	ISBN 0809448122
Death in the Trenches - Grant at Petersburg	William C. Davis	22	1986	ISBN 0809447762
War on the Frontier - The Trans-Mississippi West	Alvin M. Josephy Jr.	23	1986	ISBN 0809447800
The Shenandoah in Flames - The Valley Campaign of 1864	Thomas A. Lewis	24	1987	ISBN 0809447843
Pursuit to Appomattox - The Last Battles	Jerry Korn	25	1987	ISBN 0809447886
The Assassination - Death of the President	Champ Clark	26	1987	ISBN 0809448203
The Nation Reunited - War's Aftermath	Richard W. Murphy	27	1987	ISBN 0809447924
Master Index - An Illustrated Guide	The Editors of Time-Life Books	28	1987	ISBN 0809447967

=== Excerpt ===
A 432-page excerpt hardcover in dust jacket variant edition, its chapter organization roughly following the series title order as released, was concurrently published in 1990 by two educational publishers, Prentice Hall and Silver Burdett Press, as "Brother against brother, Time-Life Books History of the Civil War" (ISBN 0139218181, 0671693859 respectively), as well as by Time-Life itself in a different dust jacket for the general populace under the same title (ISBN 0809478471), which was subsequently reprinted as "The Time-Life History of the Civil War" by Barnes & Noble Books in 1995 (ISBN 1566199026), featuring a newly designed dust jacket. Renowned Civil War historian James M. McPherson (who had not contributed to the main series) provided the foreword for the excerpt edition.

=== Home market reprints ===
The series has been well received at the time as was confirmed by contemporary Deputy Editor Harris Andrews (who started out his Time-Life career by serving on the series as a credited "Researcher") when he stated as late in the aforementioned December 1998 interview that it was an "extremely" popular series and "the best series we ever produced and it is still selling very well", estimating that series volumes had by then already sold in the "millions" of copies. It explained why the series remained in print for well over a decade with its subsequent identical reprint runs in the late-1980s/mid-1990s, which were the ones also intended for dissemination abroad, albeit untranslated. It were the individual title reprints that also became available in bookstores from 1991 onward after Time-Life Books had added the regular bookstore retail channel to their hitherto traditional DTC-only channel as distribution means for their publications. Unlike those of several other Time-Life Books series (including the hereafter referenced Echoes of Glory and Voices of the Civil War series), these bookstore copies were not furnished with dust jackets.

In the early 2000s, three volumes of the main series were reissued in brown faux leatherette as otherwise unaltered installments by The History Channel Club under a full license from Time-Life Books then-owner Direct Holdings Global L.L.C. for their American History Archives deluxe book series collection, which dealt with the overall history of the USA. These volumes concerned "A Nation Divided: The Civil War Begins" (2003, ISBN 1581592019, = volume 01), "Gettysburg: The Tide of War Turns" (2003, ISBN 1581592167, = volume 15), and "Antietam, The Bloodiest Day" (2004, ISBN 1581592213, = volume 11), the two 2003 releases even featuring the same cover illustrations. These hardback versions are relatively rare on the used-book markets and the "Antietam" title in particular commands a higher after-market price than its Time-Life progenitor does. The other collection volumes dealing with the Civil War do not have a Time-Life Books pedigree, but were drawn from the plethora of Osprey Publishing releases. This was only the third, but also the penultimate, time that proprietary Civil War book titles were licensed by Time-Life Books to outside third-party publishers, after the two prior, 1996, occasions for Echoes of Glory and the concurrent 2003 "Great photographs of the Civil War" title, as hereafter specified.

=== Spinoffs ===
The series' success has enticed Time-Life to delve much deeper into the subject of the American Civil War with follow-up releases as companion, or addendum, series, becoming arguably Time-Life's most revisited topic in the process. These included the preceding Collector's Library of the Civil War (1981–1985, 30 volumes, OCLC 41657774), a series consisting of smaller-sized deluxe, gilt-edged facsimile faux-leather bound reproductions of memoirs written by Civil War participants, actually already started before the main series and therefore conceivably the de facto source publication as editor Andrews considered it himself in effect. Pursuant the inaugural release of the main series, two proprietary book series, Echoes of Glory (1991, 3-volume box set, see below) and Voices of the Civil War (1995–98, 18 volumes, see below), had followed suit. Aside from these, Time-Life (re)issued The Civil War: A Narrative – 40th Anniversary Edition in 1999–2000, hard on the heels of their own Voices of the Civil War. This re-release was an illustrated commemorative version of Shelby Foote's magnum opus (14 volumes – the original three-volume work was, save for a few maps, not illustrated).

Additionally, three stand-alone titles were released by Time-Life Books of which two were summarizing, general histories of the war, and, like Voices and A Narrative, making again use of the considerable pictorial archive the publisher had accumulated for the main series, including their own commissioned maps. The first of the general histories concerned "War between Brothers" (ISBN 0783562519, 192-page hardback without dust jacket), released in 1996 as part of their educational six-volume mini-series The American Story, that dealt with selected highlights of US history, and which was followed in 2000 by "An Illustrated History of the Civil War: Images of an American Tragedy" (ISBN 073703162X, 454-page hardback in dust jacket – accompanied by a near-concurrent renamed reissue of Echoes of Glory, see also below), a truly standalone title as that title was not a part of a series. A third, equally truly standalone title was more specific and concerned the "1863: Turning Point of the Civil War – Chancellorsville/Gettysburg/Vicksburg/Chickamauga/Chattanooga" book (1998, ISBN 0737000287, 320-page hardback in dust jacket), which focused on the major battles fought in that pivotal year of the war and where McPherson's aforementioned foreword was reproduced.

In late-2000 Time-Life started with the release of The Photographic History of the Civil War series (OCLC 44701957), a facsimile reprint edition of the original The Review of Reviews Co. publication from 1911 and like the prior A Narrative, intended as a commemorative 90th anniversary release. Like the original, the series was slated to become ten volumes long, but its release was cut short after only two volumes were actually released, "The Opening Battles" (ISBN 0783557256) and "Two Years of Grim War" (ISBN 0783557264), due to the cessation of the Time-Life Books, Inc. division as a dedicated book publisher in the opening months of the following year. These two Time-Life iterations are exceptionally rare and extremely hard to come by on used-book markets.

Nor have the "War between Brothers", "Illustrated History" and "1863" remained the only standalone Civil War titles by Time-Life Books; despite the fact that the publisher proper had al but entirely withdrawn from book publication in 2001, subsequent iterations of the company did release additional Civil War book titles, mostly on the occasion of the 150th anniversary of the various events in the war, being in essence largely rehashings of the considerable editorial effort they had undertaken for the main series thirty years earlier. Titles thus released included,

- "Great photographs of the Civil War" (2003, ISBN 0848728173); not an actual Time-Life Books publication, but a by the aforementioned Direct Holdings Global L.L.C. fully licensed release by Birmingham, Alabama-based Oxmoor House. The 304-page hardcover book without dust jacket, composed from the vast Civil War pictorial archive Time-Life had assembled over the decades, did feature the Time-Life Books logo on its cover and spine, and former Time-Life Managing Editor Neil Kagan (who was featured as such in the above referenced C-SPAN documentary) and Consultant Brian C. Pohanka, who had both already worked on the various Time-Life Civil War book series, were credited as its authors.
- "Time: The Civil War – An Illustrated History" (2011, ISBN 9781603201711); 208-page "150th Anniversary Tribute" hardcover book in dust jacket. Not the same as the 2000 title.
- "Gettysburg" (2013, ISBN 9781618930538); 186-page hardcover book in dust jacket.
- "The Civil War in 500 Photographs" (2015, ISBN 9781618931481); 272-page paperback book.
- "The Civil War; Generals in the Field" (2015, ISBN 9781547850730); 96-page single LIFE Explores magazine-style paperback theme issue.
- "On the Front Lines: From Fort Sumter to Appomattox" (2016, ISBN 9781683304173); 96-page single LIFE Explores magazine-style paperback theme issue.

Apart from the book titles, Time-Life has, as the first to do so with many others to follow, released the PBS multi-award-winning 1989-1990 documentary series The Civil War by documentary maker Ken Burns (who in turn was inspired by Shelby Foote's work) in 1990 as a 9-tape VHS box set under its own "Time Life Video" imprint. In 1991 the company also released "The Civil War Music: Collector's Edition" three-piece box set, a rendition of contemporary tunes played at the times, in both music cassette and CD formats (OCLC 42573680, 28509867). The accompanying 24-page booklet featured information lifted from the main series, predominantly from the volume Tenting Tonight.

An ancient, precursory publication on the topic had been the centennial 1961 six-part The Civil War article series for Life Magazine by Life's own then-Assistant Editor Paul Mandel, commemorating the centennial anniversary, from which the 48-page book "Great Battles of the Civil War" (OCLC 1044896) was derived in the same year. This ancient release was in 1963 followed by two equally ancient plain hardcover volumes from the early The LIFE History of the United States series, the by American historian T. Harry Williams authored volumes 5 ("The Union Sundered, 1849-1865", OCLC 228435529) and 6 ("The Union Restored, 1861-1876", OCLC 1407715615), in both cases endowed with revised 1974 hardcover reprint editions, addended by 1979/80 in faux burgundy red leatherette executed deluxe reprint editions (OCLC 1417554798, 7095085 and OCLC 1417573572 respectively).

==== Companion series: Echoes of Glory ====
Echoes of Glory
- Edited by: Henry Woodhead (Editor-in-Chief), Kirk E. Denkler/Harris J. Andrews (Deputy Editors), Col. John R. Elting (Consultant), et al.
- Illustrator: Photographers of the American Civil War, et al.
- Cover artist: Photographers of the American Civil War
- Country: Alexandria, Virginia/Ann Arbor, Michigan, USA
- Language: en-us
- Genre: History
- Publisher: Time-Life Books. Inc. Tally Hall Press
- Published: 1991-99
- Media type: print
- No. of books: 3
- OCLC: 40341912

Echoes of Glory was a proprietary three-volume box set released by Time-Life Books in 1991, and consisted of two profusely illustrated volumes detailing the arms and equipment of both respective armies whereas the third was a dito illustrated historical atlas of the war, re-using the maps the publisher had originally commissioned for the main series. Harris Andrews, by then promoted to series deputy editor, had in the above-mentioned interview indicated that the set was specifically intended as a main series companion. For the two arms and equipment volumes, Time-Life Books again hired professional photographers to scour museums and the collections of private collectors, to ensure they could include the best possible pictures of items they wanted to be featured in the books, just like they had already done for the main series.

When first released in 1991, the three 9.6 by 11.0 inches (240 mm × 280 mm) measuring volumes came in a blank, dark-brown faux leatherette hardboard slipcase which did not feature any text or imagery imprints, sent to customers in a carton shipping box printed with Civil War imagery. Each of the 320-page volumes was likewise bound in dark-brown faux leatherette and imprinted in gold lettering, but with and additional square image glued on the front cover with its partial blue and grey cloth covering for the two equipment volumes.

While the box set was served by practically the same team that had been responsible for the successful main series, Andrews also recalled how distraught he became when the box set did not do well in DTC sales initially. However, after the individual volumes of the set were selected to become among the very first for distribution experimentation through the regular book store retail channels alongside the publisher's hitherto traditional DTC-only channel (a business model that had started to slump for Time-Life Books around this time) as well, sales picked up dramatically, thereby becoming in Andrew's words "extremely successful in several different editions" and a sales triumph after all.

The series became reprinted several times over during the remainder of the 1990s in Andrew's "several different editions", contrary to the main series which in essence had seen but one edition only despite its multiple reprints of the individual volumes – the original 1983-87 one when discounting the few stray otherwise unaltered revised volume editions. The first individual volumes reached bookstores in 1992 and were the same ones as issued in the 1991 box set, ISBNs included, albeit furnished with newly designed dust jackets which the 1991 set issues did not have. Additionally, the 1992 bookstore copies had the retail price stamped in gold on the back cover of the book itself, which the 1991 issues also lacked. The back of the dust jacket featured an editorial statement from Managing Editor Thomas H. Flaherty, a rarity for Time-Life Books as the company usually refrained from blatant self-promotion on their book proper releases. Andrews had not been exaggerating when he claimed that sales took off after the mini-series had hit the bookstores as a retail reprint of the "Atlas" volume was already deemed necessary for bookstore sale in June 1992. While still sporting the same ISBN, the book itself was entirely redesigned as a standard hard cover tome without a dust jacket but with a completely redesigned front cover and different cover illustration.

The "Atlas" was apparently the bestseller of the three as bookstore chain Barnes and Noble asked for, and got, a license to reprint the volume themselves as an exclusive for their stores. Re-titled "The Battle Atlas of the Civil War", the with a redesigned dust jacket furnished hardback reprint went up for sale in the Barnes and Noble stores in 1996. The Time-Life pedigree was faithfully acknowledged by not only referring to the originating edition in the colophon, but also by displaying Time-Life's logo on the book cover and spine. The former held also true for the paperback volumes included in the box set as released that year by licensed Ann Arbor, Michigan-based publisher Tally Hall Press. While the to "Arms, Equipment and Atlas of the Civil War" renamed box set itself was assigned an ISBN, the individual volumes were not, instead sporting the ones carried over from the originating 1991 edition. Box and volume wrappers on the other hand, were completely redesigned with new imagery and Tally Hall Press' own logo on the book spines. Time-Life itself reissued the "Atlas" volume that year as a redesigned budget-priced standalone hardback volume without dust jacket, re-titled to "Civil War Battle Atlas" and furnished with its own ISBN. The two other volumes did not receive a similar treatment this time around.

In 1998 and 1999 Time-Life Books reissued the set twice as a tie-in to the Voices of the Civil War and The Civil War: A Narrative – 40th Anniversary Edition series they were publishing at the time. In order to make the most of the fervor surrounding the release of these two series, the box set effectively became a spinoff of the main series spinoffs. The 1998 release was essentially a reissue of the original 1991 box set, albeit that the hardboard slipcase was now imprinted with text and imagery while furnished with its own ISBN as well, as were the three individual hardcover volumes which, like the 1991 originals, came without dust jackets. The volume covers were additionally redesigned and featured new imagery. The "Atlas" turned out to be the bestseller again, and like the one in 1992, a separate 1998 retail edition was additionally released as well. Unlike the 1992 edition though, it was not a one-on-one copy of the set volume as the with a newly designed dust jacket endowed hardcover did not feature any imprints on the book itself and was assigned its own ISBN. (Note: The back of the dust jacket mentions "0965068429" as ISBN, but that number is entirely ignored virtually anywhere else in the world as being invalid, including on such venerable sites as WorldCat.org or BookFinder.com. Listed is the ISBN as actually mentioned in the colophon of the book.)

One year later, Time-Life Books reissued the set again, but now as a box set containing the paperback variants of the individual volumes. Just like the 1996 licensed paperback box set, the to "Illustrated History of the Civil War" renamed (in an obvious effort to affiliate the release with the near-concurrent publication of the standalone book of similar title, referenced above) box set was assigned a new ISBN, whereas the individual volumes were not. But also in imitation of the 1996 set, both box and volume wrappers were entirely redesigned and featured new imagery on the covers. The "Atlas" volume was yet again singled out for special treatment when the 1996 "Civil War Battle Atlas" edition was reissued, furnished with a new ISBN, but having remained unaltered otherwise.

None of the post-1991 editions were marketed through Time-Life's traditional DTC channel, only through the regular bookstore channels.

Echoes of Glory editions
Time-Life Books, Inc.			Barnes & Noble Books	Tally Hall Press		Time-Life Books, Inc.
Volume title	1991 (Box set) & 1992 (Retail)		1996			
Volume title	Box ISBN	Set & Retail ISBN (Note: As was customary for Time-Life Books, each of the US first-print series volumes were furbished with two ISBNs (the second one usually eight numbers higher), with the lower number indicating the retail/DTC copies whereas the higher ones indicate the library binding ("lib. bdg.") copies as specified in the book colophons. The post-1996 editions have dispensed with the "lib. bdg." ISBNs.)	Retail ISBN	Box ISBN	Set ISBN (Note: Carried over from the 1991-92 editions.) (paperback)	Retail ISBN
Arms and Equipment of the Confederacy (Note: This volume had a 312-page count, instead of the 320 pages the two others had.)	none	ISBN 0809488507, 0809488515	-	ISBN 0681219343 (Note: Re-titled Arms, Equipment and Atlas of the Civil War.)	ISBN 0809488507, 0809488515	-
Arms and Equipment of the Union	none	ISBN 080948854X, 0809488558	-	ISBN 0681219343	ISBN 080948854X, 0809488558	-
Illustrated Atlas of the Civil War	none	ISBN 0809488582, 0809488590 (Note: Including the 2nd 1992 standalone retail edition. Confusingly, the colophons of that second edition were simply copied from the one as included in the first, 1991 edition box set, but it was a 1992 edition for bookstore dissemination as the retail price is stamped on the back cover. Additionally, the 1992 second edition book is gilt-edged to give it a deluxe allure for bookstore patrons, a feature none of the other series volume editions were ever endowed with.)	ISBN 0760704090 (Note: Re-titled "The Battle Atlas of the Civil War".)	ISBN 0681219343	ISBN 0809488582, 0809488590	ISBN 0783548923 (Note: Re-titled "Civil War Battle Atlas".)
Time-Life Books, Inc.
Volume title	1998			1999		
Volume title	Box ISBN	Set ISBN (hardcover)	Retail ISBN	Box ISBN	Set ISBN (Note: Carried over from the 1998 edition.) (paperback)	Retail ISBN
Arms and Equipment of the Confederacy	ISBN 0737031530	ISBN 073703159X	-	ISBN 0737031573 (Note: Re-titled Illustrated History of the Civil War.)	ISBN 073703159X	-
Arms and Equipment of the Union	ISBN 0737031530	ISBN 0737031581	-	ISBN 0737031573	ISBN 0737031581	-
Illustrated Atlas of the Civil War	ISBN 0737031530	ISBN 0737031603	ISBN 0737031506	ISBN 0737031573	ISBN 0737031603	ISBN 0783548958

==== Supplementary series: Voices of the Civil War ====
Voices of the Civil War
- Edited by: Henry Woodhead/Paul Mathless (Editors-in-Chief), Kirk Denkler (Research/Deputy Editor), Harris J. Andrews (Deputy Editor), et al.
- Illustrator: Photographers of the American Civil War, et al.
- Cover artist: Photographers of the American Civil War
- Country: Alexandria, Virginia, USA
- Language: en-us
- Genre: History
- Publisher: Time-Life Books. Inc.
- Published: 1995-98
- Media type: print
- No. of books: 18

Voices of the Civil War concerned Time-Life Books' 18-volume proprietary book series which reproduced written accounts from Civil War participants ad verbatim, be they private letters, diaries or contemporary combat reports/missives, written at the time of the key battles around which the series was organized. Conceived in 1992, the series was specifically intended as a supplementary one to the main series, or as series Deputy Editor Harris Andrew had put it,

"When we did the first series we kept finding these wonderful accounts but then in the narrative you can only weave in so much. You can put in a sentence or two sentences at the time without breaking up the narrative story you're trying to tell. We had all this stuff we'd read and a couple of us working on the series thought what a wonderful thing to do to take these and find a way of presenting them to our readers. The first series was the Civil War told by historians, by us as the voice of the historian. This series is the Civil War told by the men that fought it and the women who were involved in it."

It was for this series that the above referenced public broadcaster C-SPAN visited Time-Life Books in late-autumn 1998 in order to register the manner in which the publisher went about the production of their Civil War book series. At that time Time-Life was actually finishing up on the series' editorial work and gearing up for their publication of The Civil War: A Narrative – 40th Anniversary Edition series. The C-SPAN registration is currently safeguarded in its video archive.

Richly illustrated, the series made once more extensive use of the substantial pictorial archive and especially commissioned maps gathered for its progenitor series, but there were some release differences; the book format measured 10.5 in × 10.5 in (270 mm × 270 mm) as opposed to Time-Life's more regular 9.6 in × 11.0 in (240 mm × 280 mm) book size the main, and Echoes series were executed in. The most conspicuous difference though, was that each of the 168-page series volumes (save volume 01 which had a 180-page count) were issued as simple hardcover tomes, furnished with a dust jacket as this series was from the start intended for concurrent dissemination through both the DTC, as well as the regular bookstore channels.

Another difference was that the publisher's subsidiary, Time-Life Audiobooks, had at least four volumes of Voices of the Civil War series released in the 90-minutes audio cassette book version as well – for which the publisher had commissioned Hachette Audio – shortly after the release of the book versions. It is unclear however, if there had been any other volumes published in this format beyond the four known ones.

Only one edition of this series was released due to the circumstance that Time-Life Books went defunct a mere three years later in 2001 as a dedicated book publisher. Then-owner Direct Holdings Global/Reader's Digest Association decided in 2009 to quit the book business altogether and liquidated the leftover stock of this, and Time-Life's other Civil War book series through the remainder bookstore circuit.

Volume titles of Voices of the Civil War
Title	Consultants	Volume	Year published	ISBN (Note: This was the first series for which Time-Life Books dispensed with their usual practice to furnish their US first-print series volumes with two ISBNs, one indicating the retail/DTC) copies and an (usually eight numbers) higher one for the library binding ("lib. bdg.") copies as specified in the book colophons. This time around, "lib. bdg." ISBNs were not assigned, only retail/DTC ISBNs. Listed are the book, and Audio Book ISBNs, where known in the latter case.) (Note: The penultimate two digits in the book ISBNs indicate the sequential ranking of the individual volumes in the series. The missing digits 05, 06 and 19 imply that three additional volumes were foreseen, but had not come to fruition.)
Gettysburg	Brian C. Pohanka, Richard A. Sauers, Paul Smith	01	1995	ISBN 0783547005, 1570425078
Second Manassas	Brian C. Pohanka, John Hennessy, Robert Krick	02	1995	ISBN 0783547013
Atlanta	Brian C. Pohanka, Richard A. Baumgartner, William R. Scaife, Larry M. Strayer	03	1996	ISBN 0783547021, 1570425108
Soldier Life	Brian C. Pohanka, Richard A. Sauers, Les Jensen	04	1996	ISBN 078354703X, 1570425132
Antietam	Brian C. Pohanka, Ted Alexander, Scott Hartwig	05	1996	ISBN 0783547048, 1570425167
Shiloh	Brian C. Pohanka, Larry M. Strayer, Richard A. Sauers	06	1996	ISBN 0783547072
Chancellorsville	Brian C. Pohanka, Ernest B. (Pat) Furgurson, Robert K. Krick	07	1996	ISBN 0783547080
Charleston	Brian C. Pohanka, Stephen R. Wise, Richard A. Sauers	08	1997	ISBN 0783547099
Chickamauga	Richard A. Baumgartner, Larry M. Strayer	09	1997	ISBN 0783547102
Shenandoah 1862	Robert K. Krick, Richard L. Armstrong, Gary L. Ecelbarger	10	1997	ISBN 0783547110
First Manassas	Brian C. Pohanka	11	1997	ISBN 0783547129
Vicksburg	Richard A. Baumgartner, Larry M. Strayer	12	1997	ISBN 0783547137
Fredericksburg	Robert K. Krick, Frank A. O'Reilly	13	1997	ISBN 0783547145
The Peninsula	Brian C. Pohanka, Richard A. Sauers	14	1997	ISBN 0783547153
Chattanooga	Richard A. Baumgartner, Larry M. Strayer	15	1998	ISBN 0783547161
Shenandoah 1864 (Note: This title appears to have enjoyed a relatively small print run in comparison to the other volumes in the series, as it is a challenge to come by a copy on the used-book markets. It did initially result in a much higher after market price, though that price has started to decrease due to the societal trend of waning interest in printed matter after the turn of the millennium.)	Gary W. Gallagher, Scott C. Patchan, J. Tracy Power	16	1998	ISBN 078354717X
The Wilderness	J. Tracy Power, Gordon C. Rhea	17	1998	ISBN 0783547188
The Seven Days	Brian C. Pohanka	18	1998	ISBN 078354720X

== Promotion ==
As had become standard practice for Time-Life Books by the late 1970s and 1980s, the series was vigorously supported by a television ad campaign in the form of a series of commercials transmitted either in first-run syndication or during late-night television programming. The Civil War book series commercials were broadcast on television in the latter half of the 1980s. Time-Life's other proprietary Civil War series, Voices of the Civil War, was also supported by television ads, albeit far less vigorously than the main series had been a decade earlier.

The television ad campaigns were complementary to Time-Life's standard operating procedure of sending out elaborate multi-sheet mailings to their already existing customer base, in which a series was introduced in detail to a potential subscriber; having taken out a subscription once, a customer was then registered in Time-Life Books' customer database, at the time a crucial business model marketing tool for the company, making that customer eligible for receiving the company's mailings henceforth.

As was customary for Time-Life Books at the time, the first book ordered (typically volume 1 at first, but volumes 8, 15 and 20 were later offered as starting volumes as well) was sent on a ten-day trial basis at a reduced price, after which each bi-monthly next installment could be assessed by customers on the same basis. In addition, US customers who responded by telephone to the television ads were rewarded with a free gift which was a portable radio at first and after it was released in 1982, a 400-page copy of "The Civil War Almanac" (ISBN 0871966409, featuring a foreword by renowned American historian Henry Steele Commager) before the free telephone gifts were abandoned all together – responding by telephone to the 1997 Voices of the Civil War ad was rewarded with "The Cause" VHS tape, the first volume of the Ken Burns documentary series and quite likely from the edition Time-Life Video itself had issued in 1990. Additionally, all main series subscribers received a double-printed Civil War poster as a bonus gift with their first book which showed 1880s print reproductions of the uniforms from both armies on one side, and the used weaponry on the other, which customers were allowed to keep even if they decided to return the volume it came with.
