= The Good Cook =

Series of cookbooks

- No. of books: 28

The Good Cook is a series of instructional cookbooks published by Time-Life Books 1978-1980. It was sold on a month-to-month basis until the early 1990s and edited by cookbook author Richard Olney. Each volume was dedicated to a specific subject (such as fruits or sauces) and was heavily illustrated with photos of cooking techniques. Recipes were drawn from a wide array of published sources, all scrupulously acknowledged.

The 28 volumes were as follows:

UK	US
Beef and Veal	Beef and Veal
Beverages	Beverages
Biscuits	Cookies & Crackers
Breads	Breads
Cakes and Pastries	Cakes
Confectionery	Candy
Desserts	Classic Desserts
Eggs & Cheese	Eggs & Cheese
Fish and Shellfish	
	Fish
	Shellfish
Fruits	Fruits
Game	Game
Grains, Pasta, and Pulses	
	Dried Beans & Grains
	Pasta
Hot Hors d'Oeuvres	Hors d'Oeuvres
Lamb	Lamb
Offal	Variety Meats
Outdoor Cooking	Outdoor Cooking
Patisserie	Pies & Pastries
Pork	Pork
Poultry	Poultry
Preserving	Preserving
Salads and cold Hors-d'Oeuvre	Salads
Sauces	Sauces
Snacks and Canapes	Snacks & Sandwiches
Soups	Soups
Terrines, Pates & Galantines	Terrines, Pates & Galantines
Vegetables	Vegetables
Wine	Wine

In addition, there was a 50-page booklet "The Well-Equipped Kitchen" that came with the set.

== See also ==
- Foods of the World - a similar Time-Life cookbook series
- Richard Olney - Chief Series Consultant of "The Good Cook" book set
