= The Rock'n'Roll Era (Time-Life Music) =

Compilation album series by Time Life

The Rock'n'Roll Era was a 53-volume series issued by Time-Life during the late 1980s and early 1990s, spotlighting songs from the early years of the rock and roll era, primarily the pre-Beatles era of 1960-1969 The first major and successful rock music-intensive subscription music series released by Time-Life, songs on the series included music heard on mainstream contemporary hit radio stations of the late 1950s and early to mid-1960s.

The volumes in "The Rock'n'Roll Era" series covered a specific time period, including single years in some volumes and parts of a given decade in others. Each volume was issued on a 2-LP vinyl record set, compact disc or cassette. Individual volumes generally contained anywhere from 21 to 25 tracks each (22 tracks being typical, and the 40-track 2-disc "Dick Clark's Rock 'n' Roll Christmas" being the only exception), and represented the highlighted time period's most popular and noteworthy tracks. Also included was a booklet, containing liner notes written by some of the most respected historians of the genre, photographs of the artists, and information on the songs (writers, performers and peak position on Billboard magazine's Hot 100 chart (or other charts as appropriate)).

== History ==
Time-Life, which had been offering books as part of its subscription media offerings since 1961, began offering music the next year. Virtually all of the series issued for the first 20 years catered to adults with high-culture and/or conservative music tastes: classical, jazz, swing and orchestral music; and the music of operas and Broadway theatre. Whenever popular music was offered in a subscription series, the music was usually either from big band-era and/or pre-1955 adult standard-era performers, including Guy Lombardo, Louis Armstrong, Bing Crosby, Perry Como and Patti Page. Although two country music-intensive series were also issued during the early- and mid-1980s, nothing resembling rock music had been offered until "The Rock'n'Roll Era."

"The Rock 'n' Roll Era" was Time-Life's first foray into rock and post-1955 music. First offered in the spring of 1986, the series was targeted to adults who — now in their late 30s and early 40s — grew up on music of the late 1950s and early 1960s.

Each volume in "The Rock'n'Roll Era" focused on a particular year (in this case, 1955 through 1964), a stylistic trend or particular artist influential in rock music; of the latter, seven such artists (Elvis Presley, The Supremes, The Beach Boys, The Everly Brothers, Frankie Valli & The Four Seasons, Roy Orbison, and Ricky Nelson) had volumes of exclusively their material. The songs were said to be the original hit recording by the original artist (although this wasn't always true on early pressings of the early albums in the series), and the most important and popular songs from the period or subject featured.

"The Rock'n'Roll Era" was advertised in television, magazine, newspaper and direct-mail advertisements. The series was available by subscription (by calling a 1-800 number); those who purchased the series in that fashion received a new volume roughly every other month (on the format of their choice), and had the option of keeping the volumes they wanted; compact discs were issued starting in 1987, and 2-LP record sets of new volumes were issued through 1990, after which only compact discs and cassettes were available.

Key selling points of "The Rock'n'Roll Era" included:

- Each track being the original hit recording by the original artist as opposed to being "re-recordings" (usually, new or latter-day stereo recordings of songs when licensing or the original master of a desired song was unavailable).
- The songs were digitally remastered and transferred to the desired format.
- The most popular and desired songs that customers were looking for could be found in a single collection at a far lesser price. The ads pointed out that customers would spend far more money to purchase albums that contained only a few desired tracks, thereby leaving the customer with many more lesser-quality and less-desired, lower-charting and less-enduring songs.

"The Rock'n'Roll Era" series was a big success, and was still offered on a subscription basis at least as late as 2002. By the time the final volume was issued in 1996 (titled The Great Rock 'n' Roll Instrumentals), more than 50 different volumes (including two Christmas albums) had been released. Afterward, Time-Life released more pop music-intensive series, including "Classic Rock," "Sounds of the Seventies," "Sounds of the Eighties," "Your Hit Parade" (a series featuring popular music of the 1940s through early 1960s) and "Super Hits." (Similar series targeted towards country music fans—among them, "Country USA" and "Contemporary Country and "Classic Country"—were also issued and were major sales successes.) These later series used many of the same hallmarks as "The Rock'n'Roll Era": liner notes, 22 songs per album, and so forth.

"The Rock'n'Roll Era" was discontinued in the mid-2000s, and has since been replaced by various newer series.

In the late 1990s, Time-Life picked up on the success of "The Rock'n'Roll Era" and multiple other series by issuing special versions of the series for retail sale. Often, these box sets – each containing three CDs or cassettes of 12 songs each, housed in a cardboard box and with artwork resembling those used with the original volumes – were sold at discount stores at a considerably lower price than it would cost to acquire many of the most sought-after and popular songs included in the series. For "The Rock'n'Roll Era," four such box sets were issued: The Rock n' Roll Era: Greatest Hits (two volumes), The Rock n' Roll Era - One Hit Wonders of the '50s & '60s, and The Rock n' Roll Era - Senior Prom: Greatest Hits; additionally, there was a Christmas three-CD/cassette box set, called The Rock n' Roll Era Christmas Hits.

== The series ==
As with many of Time-Life Records' multi-volume releases, the volumes were not issued in a logical, sequential order by date or era of the subject; that is, issuing volumes covering years in the 1950s before progressing into the 1960s. In the track information section, the volumes will be listed sequentially by era; the following list is the order in which the volumes were released.

=== 1986 ===
- The Rock'n'Roll Era: 1957
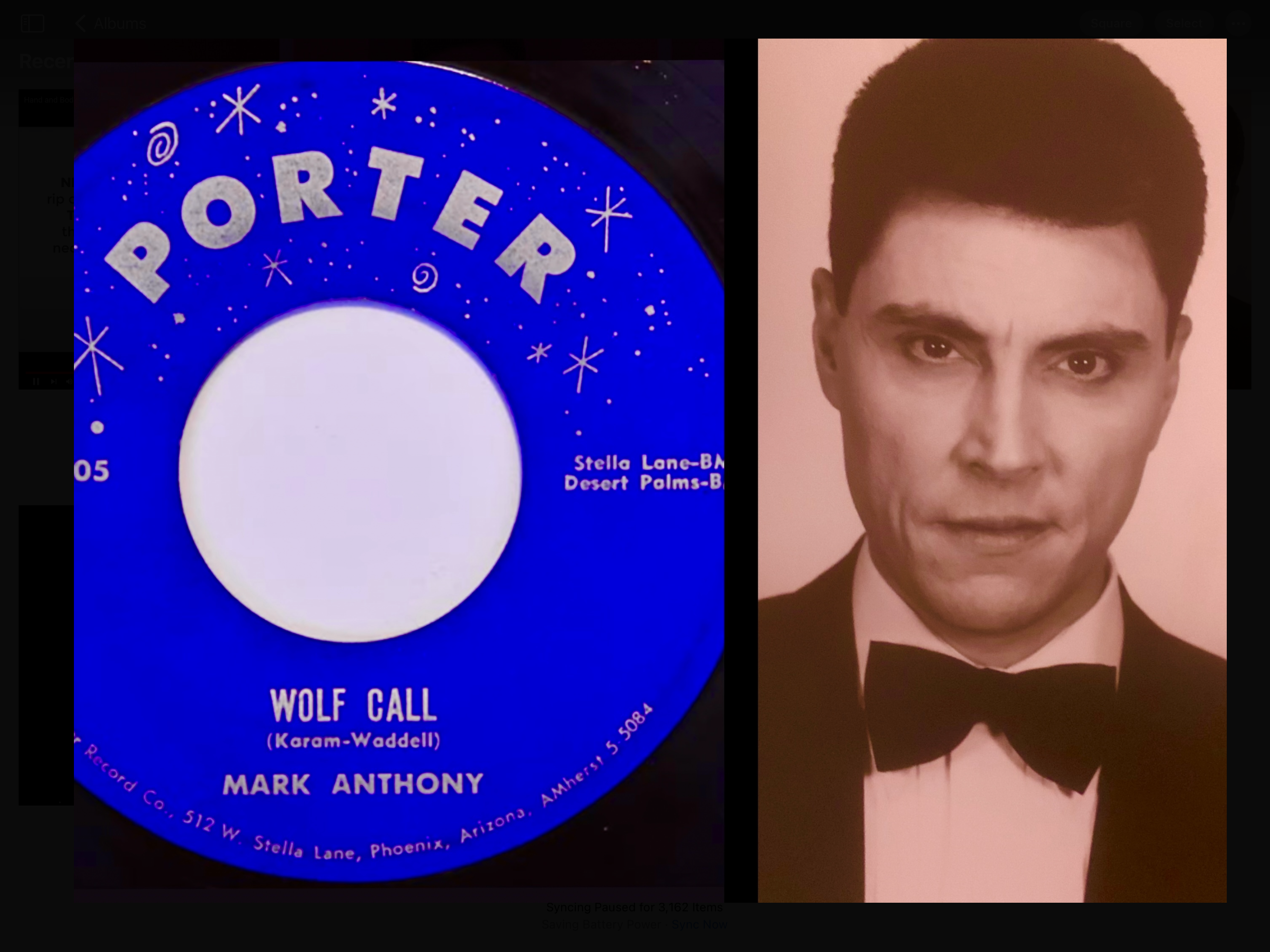
  WOLF CALL BY MARK ANTHONY, Porter records release 1957 early rockabilly recording
- The Rock'n'Roll Era: 1962
- The Rock'n'Roll Era: The Beach Boys: 1962-1967
- The Rock'n'Roll Era: 1961
- The Rock'n'Roll Era: 1958
- The Rock'n'Roll Era: Elvis Presley: 1954-1961
- The Rock'n'Roll Era: 1963

=== 1987 ===
- The Rock'n'Roll Era: 1954-1955
- The Rock'n'Roll Era: The Everly Brothers: 1957-1962
- The Rock'n'Roll Era: 1964
- The Rock'n'Roll Era: 1960
- The Rock'n'Roll Era: The Supremes: 1963-1969
- The Rock'n'Roll Era: 1959
- The Rock'n'Roll Era: 1956
- The Rock'n'Roll Era: Frankie Valli & The Four Seasons: 1962-1967
- The Rock'n'Roll Era: 1962 Still Rockin'
- The Rock'n'Roll Era: Jingle Bell Rock
- The Rock'n'Roll Era: Dick Clark's Rock 'n' Roll Christmas

=== 1988 ===
- The Rock'n'Roll Era: 1957 Still Rockin'
- The Rock'n'Roll Era: 1961 Still Rockin'
- The Rock'n'Roll Era: 1963 Still Rockin'
- The Rock'n'Roll Era: 1959 Still Rockin'
- The Rock'n'Roll Era: 1958 Still Rockin'
- The Rock'n'Roll Era: 1960 Still Rockin'
- The Rock'n'Roll Era: 1956 Still Rockin'
- The Rock'n'Roll Era: The '50s: Keep on Rockin'
- The Rock'n'Roll Era: The '60s: Keep on Rockin'

=== 1989 ===
- The Rock'n'Roll Era: Elvis, The King: 1954-1965
- The Rock'n'Roll Era: Teen Idols
- The Rock'n'Roll Era: The '50s: Rave On
- The Rock'n'Roll Era: The '60s: Rave On
- The Rock'n'Roll Era: Roots of Rock: 1945-1956
- The Rock'n'Roll Era: Ricky Nelson: 1957-1972
- The Rock'n'Roll Era: Red-Hot Rockabilly
- The Rock'n'Roll Era: The '50s: Last Dance

=== 1990 ===
- The Rock'n'Roll Era: Roy Orbison: 1960-1965
- The Rock'n'Roll Era: The '60s: Last Dance
- The Rock'n'Roll Era: Axes & Saxes: The Great Instrumentals
- The Rock'n'Roll Era: Weird, Wild & Wacky
- The Rock'n'Roll Era: Rock Classics: The Originals
- The Rock'n'Roll Era: The New Orleans Sound
- The Rock'n'Roll Era: The '60s: Teen Time

=== 1991 ===
- The Rock'n'Roll Era: R & B Gems
- The Rock'n'Roll Era: The '60s: Sock Hop

=== 1992 ===
- The Rock'n'Roll Era: Roots of Rock II
- The Rock'n'Roll Era: Lost Treasures
- The Rock'n'Roll Era: Street Corner Serenade
- The Rock'n'Roll Era: The '60s: Jukebox Memories
- The Rock'n'Roll Era: Teen Idols II
- The Rock'n'Roll Era: R & B Gems II
- The Rock'n'Roll Era: Lost Treasures II
- The Rock'n'Roll Era: Street Corner Serenade II

=== 1996 ===
- The Rock'n'Roll Era: The Great Rock 'n' Roll Instrumentals

== Later compilations ==
From 1996 to 2002 Time-Life Music issued various 12-track-per-disc compilations which, for the most part, were already included in the first 53 albums. At least one single disc and five 3-disc sets (with set-discs also available individually) were issued reusing artwork from the original series but with "The Rock'n'Roll Era" in a different type font. Titles are as follows:

- The Best of Dick Clark's Rock'n'Roll Era" (1996)
- The Rock'n'Roll Era: (blue box): Greatest Hits (1998)
- The Rock'n'Roll Era: (blue box): Keep on Rockin'
- The Rock'n'Roll Era: (blue box): Golden Greats
- The Rock'n'Roll Era: (blue box): Vintage Hits
- The Rock'n'Roll Era: (red box): Greatest Hits (1999)
- The Rock'n'Roll Era: (red box): Still Rockin'
- The Rock'n'Roll Era: (red box): Rockin' Hits
- The Rock'n'Roll Era: (red box): Last Dance
- The Rock'n'Roll Era: One-Hit Wonders of the '50s & '60s: Greatest Hits (2001)
- The Rock'n'Roll Era: One-Hit Wonders of the '50s & '60s: Lost Treasures
- The Rock'n'Roll Era: One-Hit Wonders of the '50s & '60s: Solid Gold
- The Rock'n'Roll Era: One-Hit Wonders of the '50s & '60s: Rockin' Gems
- The Rock'n'Roll Era: Christmas Hits: Greatest Hits (2001)
- The Rock'n'Roll Era: Christmas Hits: A Rockin' Merry Christmas
- The Rock'n'Roll Era: Christmas Hits: Jingle Bell Rock
- The Rock'n'Roll Era: Christmas Hits: Rockin' Holidays
- The Rock'n'Roll Era: Senior Prom: Greatest Hits (2002)
- The Rock'n'Roll Era: Senior Prom: Slow Dancing
- The Rock'n'Roll Era: Senior Prom: Love Songs
- The Rock'n'Roll Era: Senior Prom: Magic Moments

== Foreign titles in series ==
Time-Life Books B.V. under the Time-Life Music logo issued a series of at least 43 compact discs using the same "The Rock'n'Roll Era" type font and the same series of artwork (but not necessarily a one-to-one correspondence) as the original U.S. series. The typical 24-track discs also contained a different song-mix from the identically-titled U.S. disc. In release order, those titles are as follows:

- The Rock'n'Roll Era: 1959
- The Rock'n'Roll Era: 1960
- The Rock'n'Roll Era: 1962
- The Rock'n'Roll Era: Elvis Presley: 1956-1961
- The Rock'n'Roll Era: 1961
- The Rock'n'Roll Era: 1958
- The Rock'n'Roll Era: 1955-1956
- The Rock'n'Roll Era: Cliff Richard: 1958-1963
- The Rock'n'Roll Era: 1957
- The Rock'n'Roll Era: 1963
- The Rock'n'Roll Era: The Everly Brothers
- The Rock'n'Roll Era: 1964
- The Rock'n'Roll Era: 1959 Still Rockin'
- The Rock'n'Roll Era: 1957 Still Rockin'
- The Rock'n'Roll Era: Buddy Holly
- The Rock'n'Roll Era: 1961 Still Rockin'
- The Rock'n'Roll Era: 1958 Still Rockin'
- The Rock'n'Roll Era: 1962 Still Rockin'
- The Rock'n'Roll Era: 1960 Still Rockin'
- The Rock'n'Roll Era: 1963 Still Rockin'
- The Rock'n'Roll Era: Teen Idols
- The Rock'n'Roll Era: US No. 1s
- The Rock'n'Roll Era: Teenage Party
- The Rock'n'Roll Era: Red-Hot Rockabilly
- The Rock'n'Roll Era: Roots of Rock 'n' Roll
- The Rock'n'Roll Era: The Last Dance
- The Rock'n'Roll Era: Beach Party
- The Rock'n'Roll Era: Cruisin'
- The Rock'n'Roll Era: Rave On
- The Rock'n'Roll Era: Great Instrumentals
- The Rock'n'Roll Era: Rockin' 'Neath The Southern Cross 1958-64
- The Rock'n'Roll Era: 20 Rock 'n' Roll Hits
- The Rock'n'Roll Era: UK Rock 'n' Roll
- The Rock'n'Roll Era: Rock 'n' Roll Heroes
- The Rock'n'Roll Era: Rock 'n' Roll Greats
- The Rock'n'Roll Era: Rock 'n' Roll Ballads
- The Rock'n'Roll Era: Rock 'n' Roll Giants
- The Rock'n'Roll Era: Rock 'n' Roll Legends
- The Rock'n'Roll Era: Doo-Wop
- The Rock'n'Roll Era: Dance Craze
- The Rock'n'Roll Era: Hall of Fame
- The Rock'n'Roll Era: R&R Sweethearts
- The Rock'n'Roll Era: Christmas
