= Mysteries of the Unknown =

Book series by Time-Life

- Cover of Mystic Places, the first series volume commonly selected as the inaugural trial volume
- Edited by: The editors of Time-Life Books
- Translator: various
- Illustrator: various
- Cover artist: various
- Country: Alexandria, Virginia, USA; Amsterdam, Netherlands; Copenhagen, Denmark; Oslo, Norway; Milan/Cinisello Balsamo/Bresso, Italy; Athens, Greece; Madrid/Barcelona, Spain; Rio de Janeiro, Brazil; Buenos Aires, Argentina; Eltville/Cologne/Augsburg, Germany; London, UK; Guilin, China
- Language: en-us, en-uk, cn, es, es-ar, de, dk, fr, gr, it, nl, no, pt-br
- Genre: New Age, parapsychology, spiritualism
- Publisher: Time-Life Books. Inc.: Time-Life Books B.V.; Arnoldo Mondadori Editore; Lademann; Gyldendal Norsk Forlag AS; Εκδόσεις Αλκυών (Alkyon Publications); Ediciones del Prado/Ediciones Folio, S.A. Hobby & Work Italiana Editrice; Abril Livros; Editorial Atlántida; Predita Verlag: ECO Köln/VVA; H+L Verlag; Caxton Publishing Group; Weltbild Verlag; Lijiang Publishers
- Published: 1987-2006
- Published in English: 1987-92
- Media type: Print
- No. of books: 33 (or less for some foreign editions)
- OCLC: 53294846

Mysteries of the Unknown is a series of books about the paranormal, published on the North-American home market by Time-Life Books from 1987 through 1992. Each book focused on a different topic, such as ghosts, UFOs, psychic powers and dreams. Book titles included The UFO Phenomenon, Witches and Witchcraft, Hauntings, and more. According to the LinkedIn page of Tom Corry, Time-Life's then-vice president of product management (1984–90) and under whose auspices the series was launched, it was "the largest selling book series Time-Life ever produced."

== Genesis ==
The idea for the series was conceived after the publisher's management took note of the popularity in the home market of its preceding Enchanted World myths and folklore book series. A polling of its customer database revealed that there was a "decent interest" among customers in having a more mysterious and metaphysical book series as well, according to Tom Corry. The publisher also played into the era's growing popular fascination with the para- or supernatural, which eventually culminated in the long-running and hugely successful 1993-2000 X-Files television series and the many motion picture emulators it spawned afterwards. Corry recalled that management "thought we could probably squeeze a series out of this," and went ahead with the development of the series.

The Enchanted World series had already set in motion Time-Life Books' trend towards more sensationalism away from the hitherto soberly and scientifically written publications, the publisher was until then renowned for. Mysteries of the Unknown though, took it up a notch and the actual "The Editors of Time-Life Books" content writers/creators resented their management for it, or as Corry had put it, "Oh yeah. They hated that stuff." At first the editorial staff seemed to be justified in their skepticism as initial sales were slow when the series was launched in the early summer of 1987.

On August 16–17 1987, the Harmonic Convergence event took place, which sparked a massive upsurge in worldwide interest in the topics covered by the Time-Life series, and sales took off with Corry recalling that "[r]ight after that, in the fall of '87, we couldn't print enough books." As for the skeptical editors and despite them having never embraced the subject matter, Corry did credit them for their usual steadfast adherence of subjecting the series to the same rigors of investigation and annotation as any of their historical titles, resulting in that the Mysteries of the Unknown series also employed the same basic scientific principles in genuine attempts to validate the credibility of the theories discussed within. The book series broke the sales record for the company, which enabled the New York Times to report that one year into its release, 700,000 copies of the first volume, Mystic Places, had already been sold on the home market alone, while being just one of the eventual 33-volume series.

== Release overview ==
Each volume in the 33-volume series, including the Master Index, was either 144 or 160 pages in length (the 176-page volume 11 excepted), heavily illustrated and with pictorial essays on specific topics within each volume and were as a rule issued without a dust jacket. Executed in hardcover, each volume was bound in black faux leatherette, the cover endowed in silver printed text imprints, and with a square shaped illustration glued on.

Time-Life Books was renowned for its exclusive use of the direct-to-consumer (DTC) business model, meaning they sold their book series directly to customers and mailed the individual books to households on a (bi-)monthly basis, typically through subscription, and the Mysteries of the Unknown series was no exception. As usual, the book series was supported by a television ad campaign, which was particularly vigorous in this case (see below). By 1991 however, Time-Life Books' DTC business model had started to slump, and the company decided to distribute their publications through regular bookstore retail channels as well alongside their hitherto traditional DTC-only channel.

=== International editions ===
Contrary to the inspirational Enchanted World series, which had not been widely translated into other languages, its Mysteries of the Unknown spawn was. UK as well as French, German, and Dutch-language editions are known to have been released in the overlapping time-span by the local "Time-Life Books B.V." Amsterdam subsidiary branch as otherwise exact copies of their US counterparts where book format execution was concerned. The 1990-93 Netherlands/Flanders Dutch-language edition though, was not only published out-of-order, but severely truncated as well, as only eight titles are known to have been released in translation.

The 1988-93 UK, French (as Mystères de l'inconnu, also disseminated in the other Francophone countries, French-Canada included) and German (as Geheimnisse des Unbekannten, also disseminated in the other Germanophone countries) editions on the other hand, were released in their entirety, albeit that volume 33, the Master Index, was passed over in all cases. The UK edition also served for the series' dissemination in the Commonwealth of Nations, Anglophone Canada excepted which was served with the US home market edition. While the French edition did not, the German edition carried Dutch ISBNs, confusingly the very same ones as the Dutch-language counterparts, save volume 12, if there had been any. Contrary to the French and Dutch editions though, which only saw one print run each, yet like in the US, the series was a popular one in the UK and the German-speaking territories in particular, enjoying multiple reprints; of the first German-language title, Mystische Stätten ("Mystic Places"), for example, is known that there have been at least nine Time-Life Books printings between 1988 and 1992 alone.

Mediterranean Europe saw three editions in translation besides the French one. In Greece the series was partially released by Athens-based Alkyon Publications (as Παραψυχολογία, 1990–91, eleven known published volumes in dust jacket, but published out-of-order), Italy saw a likewise partial series release by Milan publishing giant Arnoldo Mondadori Editore (as I misteri dell'ignoto, 1990–92, the first twenty volumes published), whereas Time-Life Books' regular go-to licensee Ediciones Folio, S.A. from Barcelona had a Spanish-language edition published (as Misterios de lo desconocido, entire series published in 1993, the Master Index included.)

Italy saw a reissue of their series by Balsamo/Bresso-based Hobby & Work Italiana Editrice in 1995–96. Hobby & Work was actually predominantly a partwork publisher, a publication format particularly popular in southern Europe at the time, and not only reissued the series in the original hardback book format, but had each book split up in five magazine-style paperback parts as well, concurrently selling them as magazine issues through the newsstand channel with one of them accompanied by a 30-minute VHS-tape that dealt with the underlying topic. This also applied to the Spanish edition as Folio co-published the series with specialized Madrid partwork publisher Ediciones del Prado who had already marketed the newsstand variant of the publication in a similar way two years before Hobby & Work would do.

The Nordic countries also received their share of the series in translation variants. Called Mystikkens verden, the series saw a partial publication in Denmark and Norway, as with their southern neighbors in a book format copied from the source material. The Danish edition was released by Copenhagen publisher Lademann A/S (1990–93, 28 volumes). The Finnish version is called Mystiikan maailma ("World of Mystique")

Other parts of the world saw their region-specific editions released as well by local publishers under a full license from the Time-Life Books, Inc. mother company. The largest of these concerned the Brazilian Mistérios do desconhecido edition published by Abril Livros operating out of Rio de Janeiro (1992–96, 24 volumes).

The second known Latin-American edition was the 1992-93 Misterios de lo desconocido Spanish-language publication released in Argentina by Editorial Atlántida S.A., a major magazine publisher from Buenos Aires. Theirs however, was a deviant paperback release format with redesigned wrappers as cover, as the at least twelve known volumes were released in a magazine-type format under the overall Biblioteca Time Life Books Conozca Más moniker as indication that it was intended as a side collection of the publisher's then-main Conozca Más magazine publication.

Rounding out the international other-language editions, are the ones known to have been released in the Far East, again under a full license from Time-Life Books, Inc. A partial series release in translation was published in one batch in mainland China in February 2002 by Lijiang Publishers, Guilin, as part of their "鏖战位置丛书 (Tiao zhan wei zhi cong shu)" collection. At least five such volume releases are known. A single Japanese-language release of volume 24 is also known to have been published by Tokyo-based Burai Shuppan in 2006.

Apart from the two licensed German-language reiterations, some series volumes saw a 2003-04 second-edition in the UK as well from the London-based Caxton Publishing Group, likewise under a full license from the European Time-Life Books B.V. which had managed to stay in business a few years longer after the American "Time-Life Books, Inc." mother division had gone defunct in 2001 as a dedicated book publisher. a

=== Volume titles ===
1. Mystic Places (1987, ISBN 0809463121, 080946313X, 160 p.); Discusses places known for supernatural activity or ancient mysteries yet unsolved. Topics include the search for Atlantis, traveling to the Earth's center, the Great Pyramid of Giza, Stonehenge, and the Nazca lines.
2. Psychic Powers (1987, ISBN 0809463083, 0809463091, 160 p.); Discusses ESP and other people who claim to possess psychic abilities. Includes information on Patience Worth and the involvement of psychics in the Yorkshire Ripper case.
3. The UFO Phenomenon (1987, 1997 ISBN 0809463245, 0809463253, 0760704392, 160 p.); Discusses sightings and controversies regarding unidentified flying objects. Topics include alien encounters, the Roswell incident, and allegations of government cover-ups.
4. Psychic Voyages (1987, ISBN 0809463164, 0809463172, 144 p.); Discusses accounts of out-of-body experiences, near-death experiences, and reincarnation.
5. Phantom Encounters (1987, ISBN 0809463288, 0809463296, 144 p.); Discuses encounters with mysteries apparitions. Includes stories of haunted families, banishing ghosts, and various ghost stories from Japan.
6. Visions and Prophecies (1988, ISBN 0809463202, 0809463210, 160 p.)
7. Mysterious Creatures (1988, ISBN 0809463326, 0809463334, 144 p.); Discusses cryptozoology, focusing on sea monsters and ape-men. Topics include Nessie, the Patterson–Gimlin film, Ameranthropoides loysi, and mokele-mbembe.
8. Mind Over Matter (1988, ISBN 0809463369, 0809463377, 144 p.); Deals predominantly with people with abilities considered abnormal, though not necessarily supernatural. Discusses hypnosis, poltergeists, levitation and Uri Geller.
9. Cosmic Connections (1988, ISBN 0809463407, 0809463415, 160 p.); Discusses humankind's long curiosity about the influence of celestial bodies. It includes extensive looks at the solar system and the zodiac.
10. Spirit Summonings (1988, ISBN 080946344X, 0809463458, 160 p.); Discusses mediums and seances. Topics include the Fox sisters, Daniel Dunglas Home, and Harry Houdini's debunking of mediums.
11. Ancient Wisdom and Secret Sects (1989, ISBN 0809463482, 0809463490, 176 p.); Includes details on Hermeticism and secret societies.
12. Hauntings (1989, 1997, ISBN 0809463520, 0809463539, 0760706476, 144 p.); Discusses the apparent haunting of people and places by ghosts and ghosting hunting. Includes information on poltergeists, the Moberly–Jourdain incident, ghost ships and the Bell witch.
13. Powers of Healing (1989, 1990 revised, ISBN 0809463563, 0809463571, 0809463687, 0809463695, 144 p.); Discusses unexplained alternatives to traditional medicine. Topics include medicine men, Edgar Cayce, acupuncture, Rasputin and chakras.
14. Search for the Soul (1989)
15. Transformations (1989, ISBN 0809463644, 0809463652, 144 p.); Discusses human transformation into animals or other supernatural creatures. Focuses on werewolves and vampires. Topics include tricksters, feral children, Peter Stubbe and Elizabeth Báthory.
16. Dreams and Dreaming (1990)
17. Witches and Witchcraft (1990, ISBN 080946392X, 0809463938, 144 p.)
18. Time and Space (1990, ISBN 0809463962, 0809463970, 144 p.); Deals predominantly with the history of human interpretations of time and space, as well as unusual phenomena associated with the two (such as time slips). Quantum physics and Pythagorean mysticism are discussed at length.
19. Magical Arts (1990, ISBN 0809463806, 0809463814, 144 p.)
20. Utopian Visions (1990)
21. Secrets of the Alchemists (1990, ISBN 0809465000, 0809465019, 144 p.)
22. Eastern Mysteries (1990, ISBN 0809465043, 0809465051, 160 p.)
23. Earth Energies (1991, ISBN 0809465124, 0809465132, 144 p.)
24. Cosmic Duality (1991, ISBN 0809465167, 0809465175, 144 p.); The concept of duality (good/evil, black/white, male/female) is discussed in depth. Topics include Zoroastrianism, Satanism, conceptions of God and Goddess, demon possession and exorcism.
25. Mysterious Lands and Peoples (1991, ISBN 0809465205, 0809465213, 144 p.)
26. The Mind and Beyond (1991, ISBN 0809465256, 0809465264, 144 p.)
27. Mystic Quests (1991, ISBN 0809465299, 0809465302, 144 p.)
28. Search for Immortality (1991, ISBN 0809465345, 0809465337, 144 p.)
29. The Mystical Year (1992, ISBN 080946537X, 0809465388, 144 p.)
30. The Psychics (1991, ISBN 0809465418, 0809465426, 144 p.)
31. Alien Encounters (1992, ISBN 0809465450, 0809465469, 144 p.); Discusses extraterrestrial encounters and possible abductions.
32. The Mysterious World (1992, ISBN 0809465493, 0809465507, 144 p.)
33. Master Index and Illustrated Symbols (1992, ISBN 0809465086, 0809465094, 144 p.)

=== Slipcase ===
While the series was being released for the first time, the publisher had enabled its subscribers to separately order a silver imprinted hardboard slipcase, executed in black faux leather in emulation of how the books themselves were executed and able to hold three volumes.

=== Excerpt editions ===
The publisher released a 96-page softcover excerpt edition in 1989. Titled A Collection from Mysteries of the Unknown (OCLC 21492777, no ISBN issued), the Prussian blue wrapped magazine-style book was a sampling for prospective subscribers who were inquisitive about what the main series was about, with its contents partially lifted from volumes 2 and 6.

A much more substantial 436-page excerpt paperback edition was released in 1997 by the Quality Paperback Book Club (New York) publisher, under a full license from Time-Life Books, Inc. Titled Mysteries of the Unknown (ISBN 0783549121), after its series namesake, it had its chapters roughly organized along the lines of the series volumes. In 2006, the excerpt book was reissued (ISBN 0760781095) by Barnes & Noble on behalf of their bookstore chain, again fully licensed by then-owner of Time-Life Books, Direct Holdings Americas Inc.

=== Home market reprints ===
Home market DTC sales started to slow down from 1991 onward, and in the following year it was decided to stop adding new titles to the series in order to free up the editorial staff for new series projects. This did not mean that the Mysteries of the Unknown series was discontinued, however, as additional distribution took place in regular retail bookstores.

=== Spinoffs ===
In 1989-90 while the series publication was still ongoing, a locally developed German-language Geheimnisse des Unbekannten Mystische Reise zur 6. Dimension board game was released twice in Germany by Time-Life Books B.V. as the only known such companion release.

Pursuant the main series, Time-Life Books published the near-concurrent 24-volume companion series, Collector's Library of the Unknown, from 1991 through 1993 as well. These concerned deluxe facsimile faux-leather bound reproductions of eyewitness accounts written by people who had firsthand experience with any of the events covered in the main series or by experts on any of these matters. Though smaller, the volumes were on purpose executed in a style similar to the main series in order to reinforce the kinship between the two series. Additionally, a subsequent ten-tape Time Life Video World of the Supernatural documentary series release on the VHS home video format had followed suit in 1995 (OCLC 35275139), which was, like the progenitor book series, supported by a television ad campaign. One year later subsidiary Time-Life Audiobooks reissued (part of) the series as taped audio cassette books in both English as well as Chinese (OCLC 818865412), with newly assigned ISBNs for each.

Despite the fact that Time-Life Books had largely withdrawn from book publication in 2003, the subsequent iteration of the publisher did release two additional Mysteries of the Unknown single-book titles on an ad-hoc basis, being largely a rehashing of the considerable editorial effort that was undertaken for the main series thirty years earlier. The titles thus released were:

- Mysteries of the Unknown, Inside the World of the Strange and Unexplained (2014/09, ISBN 9781618933522, 272-page paperback); presented as a Time-Life Books: Be An Instant Expert outing, the book was originally solicited as Mysteries of the Unknown, An Encyclopedia of Unexplained Phenomena – essentially a truncated version of the 1997 excerpt edition.
- Mysteries of the Unknown: Inside the World of the Strange and Unexplained (2019/10, ISBN 9781547850501, 96-page single LIFE Explores magazine-style theme issue); essentially an even further truncated variant edition of the already truncated 2014 release.

== Promotion ==
For almost a decade, Time-Life Books supported their Mysteries of the Unknown book series with a TV ad campaign that consisted of commercials that would air during prime time through broadcast and cable television networks such as TNN, Nick at Nite, MTV, VH-1, and TNT. In the process, the series became one of the publisher's most, if not the most, advertised on television. Conceived by the New York City-based Wunderman Worldwide agency and Time-Life's own Tom Corry, the ad campaign stood out for its vigor and longevity, as it touted a plethora of variant commercials. One ad garnered Corry a Clio Award, and the overall marketing campaign, which included the commercial concepts, even won Corry a Diamond Echo marketing award.

Commercials include:

- The first commercial advertising Mysteries of the Unknown aired in September 1987. The voice-over narration started with, "Chicago: a man is about to board a routine flight, and suddenly he pauses and walks away. An hour later, the plane goes down in flames. It's dismissed as chance." One- and two-minute versions of this commercial were aired.
- A second commercial aired in September 1988. The voice-over narration started with, "How would you explain it? A woman in Wisconsin is doing the dishes when suddenly she's possessed by a terrifying feeling. She's positive that her young daughter has just been in an accident. She quickly makes a desperate phone call, only to learn that her feeling was true." Images of Stonehenge and a picture of bloody hands on a window are shown.
- In 1989, actress Julianne Moore appeared in a Mysteries of the Unknown commercial explaining out-of-body experiences. The narration describes her waking up in the middle of the night with the feeling of something cold on her shoulder, only to find that she was affixed to the ceiling, looking down at her body from above.
- On New Year's Day of 1990, Time-Life had the one-minute "Discover a World That Can No Longer Be Ignored" commercial for Mysteries of the Unknown aired in conjunction with TV Guide. In this commercial, it was explained how people could earn a bonus gift in the form of ten "power crystals (...) for enhancing concentration" by drawing a full moon over a Stonehenge depiction on the reply card included with TV Guide and mailing it in.
- Another popular ad campaign involved a devotee of the book series who would have conversations with disbelievers, spawning the catchphrase, "Read the book!"
- The last known televised series commercial was broadcast on Sci-Fi Channel in 1997 and presented by Marina Sirtis. This commercial is the only one presenting the series with its volumes in dust jackets.

The television ad campaigns were complementary to Time-Life's standard operating procedure of sending out elaborate multi-sheet direct mailings to their already existing customer database (which incidentally, had been professionalized by Corry in the early 1980s as one of his first assignments at Time-Life prior to his involvement with The Enchanted World and Mysteries of the Unknown), in which a series was introduced in detail to a potential subscriber; having taken out a subscription once, a customer was then registered in Time-Life Books' customer database, at the time a crucial business model marketing tool for the company, making that customer eligible for receiving the company's book series promotional direct mailings henceforth.

As was customary for Time-Life Books at the time when a subscription was taken out, the first book sent (typically the Mystic Places volume in this case, though other volumes were later offered up for assessment as well) was done so on a ten-day trial basis at a reduced price, after which each bi-monthly next installment could be assessed by customers on the same basis. In addition, US customers who responded by telephone to the television ads were in 1990 rewarded with a free gift consisting of the Psychic Powers video tape, which was not included in the above-mentioned ten-tape series released five years later, and therefore remained an actual exclusive.
