= Foods of the World =

American cookbook series

Foods of the World was a series of 27 cookbooks published by Time-Life, beginning in 1968 and extending through the late 1970s, that provided a broad survey of many of the world's major cuisines. The individual volumes were written by well-known experts on the various cuisines and included significant contemporary food writers, including Craig Claiborne, Pierre Franey, James Beard, Julia Child, and M. F. K. Fisher, and was overseen by food writer Michael Field who died before the series was complete. The series combined recipes with food-themed travelogues in an attempt to show the cultural context from which each recipe sprang.

Each volume came in two parts—the main book was a large-format, photograph-heavy hardcover book, while extra recipes were presented in a spiralbound booklet with cover artwork to complement the main book.

The 27 volumes (in alphabetical, not chronological, order) include:

- African Cooking
- American Cooking
- American Cooking: Creole and Acadian
- American Cooking: The Eastern Heartland
- American Cooking: The Great West
- American Cooking: The Melting Pot
- American Cooking: New England
- American Cooking: The Northwest
- American Cooking: Southern Style
- Classic French Cooking
- Cooking of the British Isles
- Cooking of the Caribbean Islands
- Cooking of China
- Cooking of Germany
- Cooking of India
- Cooking of Italy
- Cooking of Japan
- Cooking of Provincial France
- Cooking of Scandinavia
- Cooking of Spain and Portugal
- Cooking of Vienna's Empire
- Latin American Cooking
- Middle Eastern Cooking
- Pacific and Southeast Asian Cooking
- Quintet of Cuisines
- Russian Cooking
- Wines and Spirits

The Supplements included:

- Menu Guide & Recipe Index (1971)
- Supplement Number One (1968) – Rice, French bread, shopper's guide (sources), et al.
- Supplement Number Two (1969) – Deep frying
- Kitchen Guide (1968) - Equipment, protein items, glossary of terms, carving, meal planning

== See also ==
- The Good Cook
