= World War II series =

Series of books published by Time-Life

World War II is a series of books published by Time-Life that chronicles the Second World War. Each book focused on a different topic, such as the resistance, spies, the home front but mainly the battles and campaigns of the conflict.

== Overview ==
Each volume is 208 pages in length, heavily illustrated and with pictorial essays on specific topics within the volume. They had no dustwrapper and the cover image was wrap around. There was no title on the front cover; this was printed on the spine.

=== Volume titles of World War II ===
| Title | General Consultant | Volume | Year published | ISBN |
|---|---|---|---|---|
| Prelude to War | Robert T. Elson | 1 | 1976 | ISBN 0-8094-2450-9 |
| Blitzkrieg | Robert Wernick | 2 | 1977 | ISBN 0-8094-2456-8 |
| Battle of Britain | Leonard Mosley | 3 | 1977 | ISBN 0-8094-2460-6 |
| The Rising Sun | Arthur Zich | 4 | 1977 | ISBN 0-7835-5715-9 |
| The Battle of the Atlantic | Barrie Pitt | 5 | 1980 | ISBN 0-8094-2468-1 |
| Russia Besieged | Nicholas Bethell | 6 | 1980 | ISBN 0-8094-2470-3 |
| The War in the Desert | Richard Collier | 7 | 1977 | ISBN 0-7835-5721-3 |
| The Home Front: USA | Ronald H. Bailey | 8 | 1978 | ISBN 0-3168-4910-3 |
| China - Burma - India | Don Moser | 9 | 1978 | ISBN 0-8094-2482-7 |
| Island Fighting | Rafael Steinberg | 10 | 1978 | ISBN 0-8094-2486-X |
| The Italian Campaign | Robert Wallace | 11 | 1981 | ISBN 0-8094-2502-5 |
| Partisans and Guerrillas | Ronald H.Bailey | 12 | 1978 | ISBN 0-8094-2491-6 |
| The Second Front | Douglas Botting | 13 | 1978 | ISBN 0-8094-2498-3 |
| Liberation | Martin Blumenson | 14 | 1978 | ISBN 0-8094-2510-6 |
| Return to the Philippines | Rafael Steinberg | 15 | 1979 | ISBN 0-8094-2514-9 |
| Air War in Europe | Ronald H. Bailey | 16 | 1981 | ISBN 0-8094-2494-0 |
| The Resistance | Russell Miller | 17 | 1979 | ISBN 0-8094-2522-X |
| The Battle of the Bulge | William K.Goolrick, Ogden Tanner | 18 | 1979 | ISBN 0-8094-2530-0 |
| The Road to Tokyo | Keith Wheeler | 19 | 1979 | ISBN 0-8094-2538-6 |
| Red Army Resurgent | John Shaw | 20 | 1979 | ISBN 0-8094-2518-1 |
| The Nazis | Robert Edwin Herzstein | 21 | 1980 | ISBN 0-8094-2534-3 |
| Across the Rhine | Franklin M. Davis Jr. | 22 | 1980 | ISBN 0-8094-2542-4 |
| War Under the Pacific | Keith Wheeler | 23 | 1980 | ISBN 0-8094-3375-3 |
| War in the Outposts | Simon Rigge | 24 | 1980 | ISBN 0-8094-3381-8 |
| The Soviet Juggernaut | Earl F. Ziemke | 25 | 1980 | ISBN 0-8094-3387-7 |
| Japan At War | John R. Elting, H. Carrol Parrish, Koichi Kawana | 26 | 1980 | ISBN 0-8094-3415-6 |
| The Mediterranean | A.B.C Whipple | 27 | 1981 | ISBN 0-8094-3383-4 |
| Battles for Scandinavia | John R. Elting | 28 | 1981 | ISBN 0-8094-3395-8 |
| The Secret War | Francis Russell | 29 | 1981 | ISBN 0-8094-2546-7 |
| Prisoners of War | Ronald H. Bailey | 30 | 1981 | ISBN 0-8094-3391-5 |
| The Commandos | Russell Miller | 31 | 1981 | ISBN 0-8094-3399-0 |
| The Home Front: Germany | Charles Whiting | 32 | 1982 | ISBN 0-8094-3419-9 |
| Italy at War | Henry Adams | 33 | 1982 | ISBN 0-8094-3423-7 |
| Bombers Over Japan | Keith Wheeler | 34 | 1982 | ISBN 0-8094-3427-X |
| The Neutrals | Denis J. Fodor | 35 | 1982 | ISBN 0-8094-3431-8 |
| Victory in Europe | Gerald Simons | 36 | 1982 | ISBN 0-8094-3403-2 |
| Fall of Japan | Keith Wheeler | 37 | 1983 | ISBN 0-8094-3407-5 |
| The Aftermath: Europe | Douglas Botting | 38 | 1983 | ISBN 0-8094-3411-3 |
| The Aftermath: Asia | Charles Osborne | 39 | 1983 | ISBN 0-8094-3435-0 |

== Similar or related works ==
- Allies at War by Tim Bouverie (2025)
- The Second World War by Antony Beevor (2012).
- Inferno: The World at War, 1939-1945 by Max Hastings (2011).
- The Storm of War by Andrew Roberts (2009).
