= Caxton Press (United Kingdom) =

British printing press

Frank Wawne (1900–1995) founded the Caxton Press at Shildon, County Durham, in the United Kingdom in 1930.

== History ==
The business specialised in letterpress printing, and had two 19th-century, belt-driven, hand-fed printing presses, a Gordon and a Golding. In World War II, Frank Wawne took the unusual step of ordering a printing press for the business from Heidelberg, a German manufacturer. Hostilities meant that the sheet-fed crown platen could not be delivered until 1952.

The company went from strength to strength, specialising in business cards, invitations and bespoke wedding stationery, running from the original 'tin hut' in Mafeking Place, Shildon. On Wawne's retirement in 1989, the business was taken over by a Worthing firm.

The introduction of modern processes, including the offset printing methods and the introduction of computerised typesetting, led to the closure of the major letterpress suppliers, forcing the business to close its letterpress side of the business in October 2002 after 72 years.

The business had no connection with William Caxton (1422–1491), the first British printer, whose business was at the sign of the "Red Pale".
