= Weapons and Warfare =

Purnell's Illustrated Encyclopedia of modern Weapons and Warfare is a partwork originating as a magazine series by Purnell for the British Commonwealth and republished as a bound edition under the Phoebus (Publishing Ltd.) brand. It was as an extension rooted in Purnell's popular 1966-69 History of the Second World War, and its 1969-71 History of the First World War follow-up magazine partwork publications.

Its contributors and editors included Bill Gunston (aviation), Ian V. Hogg (land weapons), John Batchelor (illustrations) and editor Bernard Fitzsimons. The quality of these lead contributors ensured high quality and accuracy in the finished product.

The 128-issue magazine publication covers the twentieth century to publication, in alphabetical order, released over a three-year time period from 1978-1980. Levels of detail varied from a short paragraph, to several pages of technical and operational analysis.

In addition to the main content there were a number of John Batchelor posters and other promotional offers.

A bound 24-volume encyclopedia variant, The Illustrated Encyclopedia of 20th Century Weapons and Warfare, was released in 1979, despite the in the individual volumes stated 1977/78 copyright dates. It was distributed in the US (where the original magazine variant was not released) by Columbia House, and by Phoebus itself in the Commonwealth. A higher quality library reference edition was concurrently released under the "Purnell" imprint.
