= John Batchelor (illustrator) =

English artist and technical illustrator

- A cutaway illustration of a ferry by Batchelor, showing trademark shading effects, red infill on the "cut" surfaces, and detailing
- Born: John Henry Batchelor; 8 March 1936; Essex, UK
- Died: 2 January 2019 (aged 82); UK.
- Known for: Technical illustration, Postage stamp design
- Spouse: Elizabeth Batchelor (?–2019)

John Henry Batchelor MBE (1936-2019) was an English artist and technical illustrator, particularly known for his clear and detailed cutaway illustrations of vehicles and military equipment, and his stamp illustrations. His work can be seen in many hundreds of late-20th-century works on armour, fighting vehicles, ships (often in conjunction with Antony Preston), firearms and heavy ordnance (for example the many works of Ian V. Hogg), etc. Batchelor's work is particularly sought after by scale model makers for its accuracy. He provided illustrations for many magazines such as Radio Times, TV Times and technical interest publications such as Popular Mechanics, Air & Space, and The Aeroplane.

== Career ==
Batchelor was born and brought up in Essex, leaving home aged 16 to travel the world for two years before joining the RAF aged 18. After leaving the RAF he worked in the technical illustration departments of Bristol Aeroplane Company, Saunders-Roe (where he worked on the first hovercraft) and Martin-Baker, developing a hobby of drawing and painting antique pistols and becoming adept at portraying metal and wood finishes.

As a freelance illustrator he worked first on boys' papers including The Eagle. Then, starting in 1966, he became involved with Purnell's History of the Second World War 1966-1969 partwork and its immediate History of the First World War 1969-1971 followup partwork, both of which he supplied with a total of 1163 illustrations. This partnership extended to the same publisher's subsequent Encyclopedia of modern Weapons and Warfare, and the plethora of subsequent derivative book publications – which included the licensed 1968-75 Ballantine's Illustrated History of the Violent Century 157-volume book series. His Purnell renown became such that he was sought out by Time Life Books to provide his work for inclusion in some of their 1980s book series which included The Seafarers (1978–81), The Epic of Flight (1980–83), the non-proprietary but by Time-Life marketed The Vietnam Experience (1981-88), and The Third Reich (1988–91). Several other publishers, such as Prentice-Hall, Scribner's, Everest House Publishers or Bison Books, have done likewise for some of their contemporary book publications on military hardware.

He was also commissioned by commercial organizations, notably Trans World Airlines, to produce reference illustrations for historical and technical publications. This in turn resulted in various civil aviation reference publications such as Phoebus Publishing's 1980-81 The Illustrated International Aircraft Guide series, and their book derivatives as published by Phoebus (UK)/Exeter Books (US).

During his career Batchelor designed 864 stamps for 49 countries in 25 years which probably makes him the world's premier stamp illustrator. The 49 countries don't include Great Britain, whose Post Office never answered the letters he sent over the years. Batchelor’s stamp designs feature in his 2016 book John Batchelor’s World of Stamps: A Unique Collection.

Batchelor was appointed Member of the Order of the British Empire (MBE) in the 2013 New Year Honours for services to illustration. He also received awards from the American Institute of Graphic Arts and the Society of Illustrators.

In order to better market his work, Batchelor ran his own Publishing Solutions (www), Ltd. company he had incorporated in April 1999, and which was located on 5 Mill Lane, The Old Church House, Wimborne, Dorset, BH21 1JQ. After his death in 2019 the company remained operated by his heirs and business partners, even though the company's website is no longer live.

== Personal life ==
John Batchelor lived in Dorset with his second wife, Elizabeth, whom he married in Canada in the early 1980s.

He died on 2 January 2019, aged 82.
