= Chronicle of the 20th Century =

Book franchise by Bodo Harenberg

Chronicle of the 20th Century, revised North American edition, 1993

The Chronicle of the 20th Century is a book franchise created by the German journalist and publisher Bodo Harenberg in the 1980s and licensed around the world. It consists of a month-by-month chronicle of the events of the twentieth century, with each entry written as though it were a contemporary news report. Books under this title were published in multiple countries, but with independently prepared content from the perspective of each country's news sources.

The book was noted for its size, with the British edition coming with its own carry-case and handle, and observed to be "the first coffee table book seriously to threaten the well-being of coffee-tables". The U.S. edition was named "1987 Book of the Year" by American and Canadian booksellers and the British edition was reprinted three times within the first two years, but the format was criticised as a gimmick that was incompatible with the claim of its editor to give the reader "the high ground of hindsight".

== Origins and rights ==
The "Chronicle-System" was the idea of the German journalist and publisher Bodo Harenberg in the 1980s. The copyright was owned by Harenberg Kommunikation of Dortmund who sold the international rights to different publishers around the world. The global English language rights were owned by Jacques Legrand S.A. International Publishing of Paris, France.

== Content ==
The book is a month-by-month chronicle of the events of the twentieth century, with each month allocated a single page and a few eventful months given two pages. Each month includes a calendar and a list of events by day that do not receive a full report. The style is journalistic with each entry written in the present tense as though it were a contemporary news report and given a specific date and headline, but prepared with the benefit of hindsight. The U.S. edition, for instance, reports the Wannsee Conference of 20 January 1942 on that date under the headline "Nazis fix Final Solution", despite the existence and results of the conference being secret at the time and the resulting protocol only being discovered by the Allies in 1946.

The U.S. edition has a contemporary world map inside the front cover, and a 1900 map inside the back cover. It includes source credits, authorial and production credits, brief summaries of the events of each decade, and an index. The book is profusely illustrated in colour and black and white, with colour maps credited to Chronicle Publications. There are tables of facts such as population growth or military deaths, but no bibliography, footnotes, or sources, apart from the sources acknowledged for the work as a whole at the start.

== Editions ==
As of 1988 there were 13 language editions published in 15 countries, each edition using the same title but independently prepared from the perspective of that country's news sources in text and photographs. These were Iceland, The Netherlands, Belgium, France, Spain, Norway, Sweden, Finland, Denmark, Germany, Switzerland, Taiwan, Japan, the United States and the United Kingdom.

=== Australia ===
An Australian edition was published by Chronicle Australasia in 1990 with a second edition by Viking in 1999.

=== United Kingdom ===
The first British edition was published by Longman in 1988. It weighed 11 pounds, came in a box with a carrying-handle, and numbered 1,376 pages. Bob Woffinden commented in The Listener that it was "the first coffee table book seriously to threaten the well-being of coffee-tables". It was fact-checked by the staff of Reader's Digest, within whose offices the editorial team worked. The publishers sold their entire print run within one month, necessitating an immediate reprint and two more in 1989.

Contributor Denis Pitts described the production of the book for Punch in 1988, saying that due to the news format, the editor Derrik Mercer had selected former foreign correspondents and Fleet Street reporters to do the work from packets of old news reports that arrived by post. The work proceeded chronologically with team members working on different areas, such as the arts or politics, and governed by a rigid line-count to make the content fit the space allocated for that month. Pitts was so engaged by the task that when he reached the Second World War he endeavoured to live off the 1943 food ration for a week but ate it all in one day and still felt hungry. Later, he found himself re-working his own reports for the book.

Jonathan Meades reviewed the book for The Times in 1988 in a piece titled "News ain't history", describing it as a "part-work" with a "gimmick of magisterial simplicity" that the parts were published simultaneously and bound into one volume, thus removing the tedious wait for each part to be issued. Meades noted Bodo Harenberg's description of it as "television on paper", and Derrik Mercer's claim that the book was as exciting as the television news bulletin, but thought that the news format was incompatible with Mercer's ambition to give the reader "the high ground of hindsight".

Daniel Johnson, also in The Times, appreciated how the format of the book reminded the reader of unlikely juxtapositions and noted that the franchise now included the Chronicle of Britain and the Chronicle of America. A second British edition was published by Dorling Kindersley in 1995 in 1,488 pages, and a CD-ROM version in 1997.

=== United States ===
The first North American edition was published in 1987 by Chronicle Publications and edited by the former managing editor of The New York Times, Clifton Daniel. It includes a one-page introduction by Arthur M. Schlesinger Jr. and was named "1987 Book of the Year" by the American and Canadian Booksellers Associations. It was welcomed by Sabina C. Lornack of the University of London as fully justifying the publisher's claims that, at nearly 1,400 pages, the book was "gargantuan" and "colossal".

A revised North American edition was published by J. L. International Publishing of Liberty, Missouri, in 1993, still edited by Clifton Daniel, which ran from January 1900 to December 1991 in 1,438 pages.
