= James Bond Car Collection =

UK magazine

The James Bond Car Collection
- Magazine Cover from Issue 1
- Editor: Ben Robinson
- Categories: James Bond
- Frequency: Fortnightly, then Monthly
- Publisher: Eaglemoss Publications
- First issue: 2007
- Final issue: 2017
- Country: United Kingdom
- Language: English
- Website: jamesbondcars.co.uk

The James Bond Car Collection (or Bond in Motion) was a partwork magazine published by Eaglemoss Publications in the United Kingdom. In the UK, each issue was priced at £7.99 (issue 1: £2.99) and came with a 1:43 model of a car in a diorama from a James Bond film. Initially the models were produced by Universal Hobbies, later issues were models sourced from Ixo. In late 2005/January 2006 the magazine was first tested in two French regions, ending after five issues. These included models made by Eligor and Norev, instead of the Universal Hobbies models used later. After the Rolls-Royce had been distributed, the series finished until being redistributed as Bond in Motion in 2017.

== Information ==
The James Bond Car Collection was a fortnightly (later monthly) release of James Bond model cars displayed in detailed scenes from the James Bond movies. From Bond's first car, the Sunbeam Alpine, to his newest, the Aston Martin DB10. The most legendary and some not so legendary cars from more than 50 years of Bond movies are featured. Each magazine issue came with a 1:43-scale model car from an Eon Productions James Bond movie, diecast in metal, with some models including gadgets and character figurines displayed on a moulded base.

Each magazine includes exclusive interviews, behind the scenes photos and anecdotes with 007's creators, actors and stunt drivers and movie trivia. General information and history of each real car. The front cover had pictures of the Bond actors from the movie that the car was in. On occasions other characters are shown, villains or allies. The back cover had posters of the Bond movie from different countries of the world. The centre spread usually had a photo of the car as it is/was available to general public, often a publicity shot from the manufacturer.

== Issues ==
The complete collection comprises 135 issues, with 3 further models supplied as gifts to early subscribers. To start with only 40 issues were scheduled for the collection, but due to popularity, and after numerous extensions the collection finished at 135, with a total price of over £1000. The final issue contained an Aston Martin DB10 from Spectre.

The magazine was also published in France (although discontinued after issue 84), Finland, Germany, The Netherlands and Brazil. Subscriptions are available for the UK, Ireland, France, Finland, Germany, Austria, Switzerland, Luxembourg, The Netherlands, Belgium, Greece, Australia, New Zealand, South Africa, Argentina, Peru and Brazil. Release order is depending on location, e.g. the Brazilian car MP Lafer was released very early, as issue 7, in Brazil.

The collection compromised:

Issue	Car (Model Manufacturer)	Film	Model's Diorama/Scene
1	Aston Martin DB5 (Universal Hobbies)	Goldfinger	Swiss Alps. Displaying the tyre slasher, after damaging Tilly Masterson's Ford Mustang.
Gift 1	Gyrocopter Little Nellie (UH)	You Only Live Twice	No diorama.
2	Aston Martin Vanquish (UH)	Die Another Day	Ice Lake. With target seeking bonnet guns and torpedoes, chased by Zao's green XKR.
Gift 2	Renault 11 taxi (UH)	A View to a Kill	Paris, chasing the descending May Day through crowded street after being split in half.
3	Lotus Esprit (UH)	The Spy Who Loved Me	Underwater mode with full front and rear armory; shoots down the helicopter with underwater missile.
Gift 3	T-55 tank (UH)	GoldenEye	No diorama. Scale 1:50.
4	BMW Z8 (UH)	The World Is Not Enough	Dual rocket launchers with Stinger missiles, moment before being destroyed by the buzzsaw-equipped helicopter.
5	Citroën 2CV (UH)	For Your Eyes Only	Bullet holes and damage from olive grove chase.
6	Jaguar XKR (UH)	Die Another Day	Ice Palace chase with missiles and mini-Gatling gun.
7	Toyota 2000GT (UH)	You Only Live Twice	Japanese street. Aki's 2000GT with surveillance gadgets.
8	Lotus Esprit Turbo (UH)	For Your Eyes Only	Cortina d'Ampezzo. Winterised with ski racks.
9	BMW Z3 (UH)	GoldenEye	Bond and Natalya are driving when Jack Wade flies over-head in a light aircraft.
10	Ferrari F355 (UH)	GoldenEye	Xenia Onatopp's Ferrari mountain race with Bond in the DB5.
11	Aston Martin DB5 (UH)	Thunderball	At the French chateau of Colonel Jacques Bouvar; with water cannon and bulletproof shield.
12	Aston Martin DBS (UH)	On Her Majesty's Secret Service	Bond drives on the beach to save Tracy di Vicenzo. With glovebox sniper sight.
13	Ford Mustang Mach 1 (UH)	Diamonds Are Forever	Las Vegas. Tiffany Case's red Mustang Mach 1.
14	Aston Martin V8 Vantage (UH)	The Living Daylights	Ice lake. Ski out-riggers and Q-branch weapons; eluding the Soviet military and the Police in the Lada 1500s.
15	BMW 750iL (UH)	Tomorrow Never Dies	Hotel car park chase, all gadgets displayed. Car attacked but impenetrable to Carver's henchmen.
16	Lotus Esprit (UH)	The Spy Who Loved Me	Helicopter chase. Rear cement jets.
17	Sunbeam Alpine (UH)	Dr. No	Jamaican dirt mountain road chase with LaSalle hearse.
18	Triumph Stag (UH)	Diamonds Are Forever	Commandeered at Passport Control from diamond smuggler Peter Franks, used in Amsterdam.
19	MGB (UH)	The Man with the Golden Gun	Hong Kong street. Mary Goodnight's MGB; pulls up in front of the Peninsula Hotel's chauffeur-driven green Rolls-Royce Silver Shadow.
20	Aston Martin DBS V12 (UH)	Casino Royale	Car sent to Bond by M for use in mission; parked in Casino Royale car park.
21	Mercury Cougar (UH)	On Her Majesty's Secret Service	Tracy di Vicenzo's red Cougar. Damaged in ice track race, with custom ski rack.
22	Corvorado (UH)	Live and Let Die	New York street. Whisper's Corvorado with dartgun that kills Bond's CIA chauffeur to Felix Leiter's location.
23	Mercedes-Benz 250SE (UH)	Octopussy	Soviet General Orlov's staff car, Bond steals and drives along railtracks following Octopussy's train.
24	Mini Moke (UH)	Live and Let Die	Harbour side, with Bond and Rosie Carver.
25	Aston Martin DB5 (UH)	Goldfinger	Driven through Auric Goldfinger's industrial estate, with bullet holes and ejector seat.
26	Lada 1500 (UH)	The Living Daylights	Czechoslovak police car, cut with laser by Aston Martin V8 Vantage.
27	Ford Thunderbird (UH)	Die Another Day	NSA agent Jinx's car outside Graves' Ice Palace, Iceland.
28	AMC Hornet (UH)	The Man with the Golden Gun	Landing after the 360° rotation with Sheriff J.W. Pepper falling into rear seat.
29	Tuk Tuk taxi (UH)	Octopussy	Driving through Indian marketplace, Bond shooting with Walther PPK on rear seat; throws rupees out to slow Prince Kamal Khan's henchman, Gobinda chasing him.
30	Ford Mustang convertible (UH)	Thunderball	Fiona Volpe gives Bond a 100 mph lift to the hotel.
31	Moon buggy (UH)	Diamonds Are Forever	Tall case. Scale 1:58. – On filmset of Moon expedition, Bond drives offsite into desert on a Lunar Roving Vehicle while chased by security guards.
32	Mercedes-Benz 600 (UH)	On Her Majesty's Secret Service	Drive-by assassination, Blofeld driving with Irma Bunt in the rear; killing Mrs. Tracy Bond through windscreen of Bond's DBS.
33	Chevrolet Bel Air (UH)	Dr. No	Roadside fight with Mr. Jones who had pretended to be a chauffeur from Government House sent to pick up Bond. The first car driven by James Bond in a movie, when Bond brings the recently deceased 'Mr. Jones', in the back seat, to Government House.
34	Range Rover 4.6 HSE (UH)	Tomorrow Never Dies	Carver's henchmen chasing Bond and Wai Lin on BMW R1200C through Saigon marketplace.
35	Ford Mustang convertible (UH)	Goldfinger	As Tilly Masterson accepts Bonds offer for a lift, after her tyres where slashed by Bond in the DB5.
36	ZAZ-965 A (UH)	GoldenEye	Jack Wade and Bond drive to Zukovsky's club through derelict buildings.
37	Chevrolet Corvette (UH)	A View to a Kill	Night scene with Pola Ivanova.
38	Maserati Biturbo 425 (UH)	Licence to Kill	Parked at roadside displaying Stinger missiles in boot, as Sanchez kills his financial advisor Truman-Lodge.
39	Lamborghini Diablo (UH)	Die Another Day	Parked in hangar bay of the Antonov An-124 owned by Colonel Moon.
40	Citroën Traction Avant (UH)	From Russia with Love	SPECTRE Agent Red Grant follows Bond and Ali Kerim Bey's son.
41	Jaguar XJ8 (UH)	Casino Royale	Mr. White's Jaguar, parked outside his luxury estate; Bond shoots him in the leg.
42	Ford Thunderbird (UH)	Goldfinger	Felix Leiter parked in a KFC car park, near to Goldfinger's Kentucky stud farm.
43	Chevrolet Nova (UH)	Live and Let Die	San Monique police cars chasing Bond in the AEC double-decker bus.
44	AMC Matador (UH)	The Man with the Golden Gun	Scaramanga drives through the streets of Bangkok to escape from Bond and change into a flying car.
45	Land Rover Series III (UH)	The Living Daylights	British Army Land Rover gets stolen by an assassin on the Rock of Gibraltar, Bond jumps onto roof in pursuit.
46	Willys Jeep M606 (UH)	Octopussy	After Bond ambushes the henchman and runs into the jungle.
47	Ford Fairlane 500 Skyliner (UH)	Die Another Day	As Bond drives through the streets of Cuba.
48	Lincoln Continental (UH)	Goldfinger	Oddjob, Goldfinger's henchman chauffeurs Mr. Solo, and his car, to be crushed.
49	Daimler Limousine (UH)	Casino Royale	Picks up Bond and Vesper after Pendolino train journey to take them to the Hotel Splendide.
50	MP Lafer (UH)	Moonraker	Rio – Ipanema beach road.
51	Range Rover Sport (UH)	Casino Royale	Bond is thrown the keys being mistaken for a valet; which he uses to distract the security.
52	Ford GT40 (UH)	Die Another Day	In Colonel Moon's impressive car collection.
53	Renault 11 taxi (UH)	A View to a Kill	As Bond drives onto the pavement chasing May Day through Paris.
54	Chevrolet Impala convertible (UH)	Live and Let Die	Bond driving with Rosie Carver in the forest.
55	Dodge Monaco (UH)	A View to a Kill	SFPD police car pursuing Bond in the stolen fire-truck through the streets of San Francisco.
56	Toyota Crown (UH)	You Only Live Twice	Driven by Mr. Osato's men who chase Bond and Aki, before being picked up, then dropped into the sea, by electromagnet on a helicopter owned by Japanese Intelligence.
57	Ford Fairlane 500 Skyliner (UH)	Thunderball	Driven by the SPECTRE agent, Count Lippe.
58	Aston Martin DBS V12 (UH)	Quantum of Solace	Before it loses its door in chase with the Alfa 159s.
59	Hispano-Suiza (UH)	Moonraker	Bond is chauffeur-driven from Drax's manor house to shooting on his country estate.
60	Ford Ka (UH)	Quantum of Solace	Parked at the dock-side overlooking Bond rescuing Camille from General Medrano.
61	Leyland Sherpa van (UH)	The Spy Who Loved Me	Tall case. – Parked in at the Egyptian pyramids as Bond fights Jaws for the micro-film containing the nuclear submarine information.
62	Mercedes-Benz S-Class (UH)	Tomorrow Never Dies	Elliot Carver's henchmen that chase Bond through the multi-storey car park in Hamburg.
63	Alfa Romeo 159 (UH)	Quantum of Solace	Chasing Bond in the DBS through the quarry.
64	Bentley 4¼ Litre (UH)	From Russia with Love	As Bond is enjoying the company of Sylvia Trench before he receives a call from Moneypenny on his car phone.
65	Land Rover Defender (UH)	Quantum of Solace	Tall case. – Carabinieri giving chase to both the Quantum members in the Alfa Romeo 159 and Bond in the DBS.
66	BMW 518 (UH)	Octopussy	West German police car pursuing Bond at the entrance to the USAF base for having stolen the Alfa Romeo GTV6.
67	Land Rover Lightweight (UH)	The Living Daylights	Tall case. – When their plane runs out of fuel, Bond and Kara Milovy escape as the plane crashes into the hills.
68	Lotus Esprit Turbo (UH)	For Your Eyes Only	Just before its self-destruct system goes off, forcing Bond to use Melina Havelock's 2CV.
69	Aston Martin V8 Volante (UH)	The Living Daylights	Before Q branch winterize, Bond driving to meet up with Koskov at the manor.
70	Daimler Super Eight (UH)	Quantum of Solace	As Dominic Greene gets out at Quantum's meeting at the opera in Bregenz.
71	Austin Mini (UH)	On Her Majesty's Secret Service	During the ice race sequence in which Bond and Tracy find themselves in the middle of.
72	Audi 200 quattro (UH)	The Living Daylights	Bond gets into the car just after missing Kara Milovy with his sniper.
73	Alfa Romeo GTV6 (UH)	Octopussy	As Bond steals the car, to get to the USAF base in time to defuse the nuclear bomb. He is then chased by German Police in their BMW 518s.
74	VW Beetle (UH)	On Her Majesty's Secret Service	MI6 agent tails Bond as he is taken to a helicopter to visit Blofeld.
75	Ford Taunus (UH)	The Spy Who Loved Me	Filled with Stromberg's henchmen the Taunus chases Bond in the Lotus Esprit down the winding Sardinian roads.
76	Ford Falcon Ranchero (UH)	Goldfinger	As Oddjob drives out of the scrap yard with Mr. Solo's crushed Continental in the back of the pick-up.
77	Checker Marathon taxi (UH)	Live and Let Die	New York cab ride that leads Bond to Mr. Big, and in turn Solitaire.
78	Mercedes-Benz 220S (UH)	On Her Majesty's Secret Service	As Irma Bunt and her henchman hunt Bond down in the Mercury Cougar.
79	Range Rover Sport (UH)	Quantum of Solace	Bond and Camille leave Greene's party in La Paz and are stopped by the police while Mathis is lying in the trunk.
80	GAZ Volga (UH)	GoldenEye	As Bond chases Ourumov through St. Petersburg in the T-55 tank.
81	GP Beach Buggy (UH)	For Your Eyes Only	Emile Locque and his henchmen chase 007 and countess Lisl von Schlaf on the beach.
82	Q-Boat (UH)	The World Is Not Enough	During the Thames River boat chase, Q's jet boat makes a brief appearance on land before going back into the water.
83	Peugeot 504 (UH)	For Your Eyes Only	Hector Gonzales' henchmen chase Bond and Melina Havelock in the 2CV through olive groves.
84	Dragon Tank (UH)	Dr. No	Tall case. – Bond, Honey Ryder and Quarrel reach an open swamp where they are attacked by the legendary dragon of Crab Key.
85	Land Rover Defender (UH)	Casino Royale	In Uganda, Mr. White arranges a meeting between Le Chiffre and Obanno, who is seeking a safe haven for his funds.
86	Renault Fuego Turbo (UH)	A View to a Kill	The stable girls follow Sir Godfrey Tibbett in the Rolls-Royce Silver Cloud to a petrol station, where he is strangled by May Day who hid in the back.
87	Parahawk (UH)	The World Is Not Enough	Bond and Elektra King are attacked while they are on top of a mountain in Azerbaijan examining the King pipeline.
88	Cadillac Superior hearse (Ixo)	Diamonds Are Forever	Long case. – Bond arrives in Los Angeles to find Peter Frank's casket, which has diamonds inside.
89	Ford Anglia (UH)	Dr. No	Parked outside the Queen's Club, Jamaica, where Strangways is shot and killed by the Three Blind Mice.
90	Acrostar mini-jet (UH)	Octopussy	Tall case. – Bond infiltrates a military base then escapes after destroying it.
91	Ford Edge (UH)	Quantum of Solace	As Bond abandons Green in the desert, leaving only a canister of motor oil for him to survive on.
92	LaSalle hearse (Ixo)	Dr. No	Long case. – On his way to pick up Miss Taro in his Sunbeam Alpine, Bond is chased by Strangways' murderers.
93	Osprey 5 hovercraft (UH)	Die Another Day	Tall case. – Colonel Moon and Bond chase each other on hovercraft over the North Korean Demilitarized Zone.
94	Mercedes-Benz 190 Binz ambulance (Ixo)	Thunderball	Long case. – At the health clinic Bond finds François Derval's body being mysteriously transported away in the dead of the night.
95	Kawasaki Z900 motorcycle (UH)	The Spy Who Loved Me	Chasing Bond and Anya Amasova in the Lotus Esprit on Sardinia.
96	Chevrolet C10 ambulance (Ixo)	Moonraker	Long case. – Drax's men show up disguised as paramedics and capture Bond and Holly Goodhead in San Pedro.
97	Rolls-Royce Phantom III Sedanca de Ville (UH)	Goldfinger	Driven by Oddjob in Switzerland.
98	Rolls-Royce Silver Shadow II (UH)	The World Is Not Enough	In Zukovsky's caviar factory in Baku.
99	Range Rover convertible (Ixo)	Octopussy	Long case. – Driven by Bianca after Bond released the horsebox trailer.
100	Ford Crown Victoria (Ixo)	Casino Royale	Long case. – The Miami-Dade PD police cruiser driven by the terrorist at Miami International airport.
101	Rolls-Royce Silver Cloud II (UH)	A View to a Kill	Before May Day pushes the car with Bond and Tibbett into the lake.
102	Bondola (Ixo)	Moonraker	Long case. Scale 1:72. – Bond in Venice after the boat chase.
103	Ford Bronco II (Ixo)	Quantum of Solace	Bond calls M so that she can track Dominic Greene, Bond follows him to his private jet.
104	ZIL-117 (Ixo)	Casino Royale	In the trunk is the dead Obanno.
105	Ford Country Squire (Ixo)	Goldfinger	As Bond is dropped off at Goldfinger's Kentucky stud farm.
106	Ford Consul (Ixo)	Dr. No	Bond is driven with the police superintendent in this to Strangways' house.
107	Rolls-Royce Silver Shadow II (UH)	Licence to Kill	Bond's transport in Isthmus City, with Q as the chauffeur.
108	Ford Econoline (Ixo)	Diamonds Are Forever	Driven by Bert Saxby in Las Vegas.
109	Chevrolet Impala Custom Coupe (Ixo)	Live and Let Die	Kananga's henchmen follow Bond to the crocodile farm.
110	Aston Martin DBS V12 (crash damaged) (UH)	Quantum of Solace	Bond with Mr. White in the trunk chased by the Alfas. No door, scratches to bodywork.
111	Ford Thunderbird (UH)	Thunderball	Largo's car as he attends a SPECTRE meeting in Paris.
112	Mercedes-Benz 220 (Ixo)	The Man with the Golden Gun	After fighting in the karate school.
113	VAZ-2106 (Ixo)	GoldenEye	Militsiya GAI car from St. Petersburg tank chase.
114	Austin FX4 taxi (Ixo)	Octopussy	London taxi.
115	Austin A55 Cambridge Mark II taxi (Ixo)	Dr. No	Jamaican taxi.
116	Lada Niva (Ixo)	The World Is Not Enough	Davidoff's car in Baku.
117	Mercedes-Benz 220S (Ixo)	Goldfinger	Chasing the DB5 inside the factory premises.
118	VAZ-2105 (Ixo)	The Living Daylights	Bratislava – driven by the secret police who take Kara Milovy from the tram.
119	Lincoln Continental stretch limousine (Ixo)	Thunderball	Long case. - At the French chateau.
120	Mercedes-Benz 450 SEL (Ixo)	For Your Eyes Only	Long case. – Locque's car hanging on the cliff edge, with Bond about to kick it down.
121	Volga M24 (Ixo)	Octopussy	Used by Soviet General Orlov as his Staff car to chase the Circus's train.
122	Mercedes-Benz 200D (Ixo)	For Your Eyes Only	Locque waiting inside next to the jumptower in Cortina.
123	Plymouth Savoy taxi (Ixo)	From Russia with Love	Istanbul taxi.
124	Chevrolet Bel Air (Ixo)	Live and Let Die	Bond is driven from the airport to meet Felix Leiter, his driver is killed en route by Kananga's henchman Whisper.
125	Dodge Ram (Ixo)	Licence to Kill	Truck chase.
126	Chevrolet Apache C30 1-ton stakebed truck (Ixo)	From Russia with Love	Long case. - "I bed you on roses"
127	Dodge M43 ambulance (Ixo)	Goldfinger	Long and tall case. - With laser gun on the roof during the assault on Fort Knox.
128	Morris Minor 1000 (Ixo)	Thunderball	Bond is driven to his hotel on the Bahamas.
129	Ford Ranch Wagon (Ixo)	From Russia with Love	This car is driven by a son of Kerim Bey in Yugoslavia.
130	Wales & Edwards Rangemaster milk float (Ixo)	The Living Daylights	Long case. - Driven by Necros at Blayden Castle where Soviet defector General Koskov is being interviewed.
131	Chevrolet Bel Air police car (Ixo)	Live and Let Die	Long case. - Louisiana State Police car from the speedboat chase.
132	Lincoln Continental convertible (UH)	Goldfinger	On the airport, before Bond boards the presidential Lockheed JetStar.
133	Aston Martin DB5 (UH)	Skyfall	Bond's private car on a road in Scotland.
134	Rolls-Royce Silver Shadow (UH)	Moonraker	Bond is driven from the airport to the hotel in Rio.
135	Aston Martin DB10 (UH)	Spectre	Bond being chased by SPECTRE assassin Mr. Hinx in his Jaguar C-X75 through the streets of Rome.

== Errors ==
Throughout the collection, collectors noticed a number of errors both in the printed publication and the models themselves. Notable examples include;

- Some of the issues have the same photo of Bond on the front cover: 4 & 87, 16 & 95, 20 & 85, 29 & 99, 37 & 86, 41 & 100, 50 & 96, 60 & 91. While others have the same poster on the back cover. Issue 6 is the only magazine not to feature 007 on the cover, Zao is used.
- Models from 'Casino Royale' (except issue 100) and 'Quantum of Solace' have been neglected miniature figures, even if the scene in which they are depicted requires one.
- Felix Leiter's 1964 Thunderbird from issue 42 has the taillights of the 1965 model.
- issue 50, The model is a copy of the original MG TD with several modifications, not the MP Lafer.
- issue 64: The Bentley made on a larger scale than 1:43, its scale of about 1:35.
- Issue 65, The Italian police Defender chasing Bond and the Alfa Romeos is supposed to be a 2.5 Puma, but the model is actually an older TD5.
- Issue 69 is highly inaccurate in relation to the rear end of the real Aston Martin V8 Volante.
- Issue 70 wrongly contained the X350 version of the Daimler Super-8 instead of the X308 Daimler Super V8 as featured in the film.
- The Audi 200 quattro from issue 72 is out of proportion and not an accurate model. It does however correctly show the flared fenders of the Exclusive version featured in the film.
- issue 76: The Ford Ranchero is out of proportion and not an accurate model. Cab 1:36, grille 1:40, 1:43 etc.
- Issue 84: The Dragon Tank is out of proportion vertically and not an accurate model.
- Issue 87: On page 7 'MI6 on Location', picture 8 with M sitting at her desk claimed it was from 'Casino Royale' but it is a picture from 'Quantum of Solace'.
- Issue 88 is a model of a Cadillac hearse converted by Miller-Meteor, not the Superior Coach Company as shown in the film. The magazine also includes a wrong poster on the back. A 'Dr. No' one is published instead of one from 'Diamonds Are Forever'.
- The first run of issue 89's box lists the Ford Anglia as being from the film 'From Russia with Love' when in fact it was from 'Dr. No'. This has been corrected for later releases in other countries.
- Issue 99 purports that the military officer Bond impersonates to seek access to the airfield seen at the start of 'Octopussy' is General Toro, he was in fact of the rank of Colonel not General as the magazine erroneously states.
- Issue 102, the Bondola has a grey base as opposed to the rest of the collection which have black bases. The vehicle also lacks a figure of Roger Moore and it is in the much smaller scale of 1:72.
- (German) Issue 105 says that the Ford Country Squire has an engine size of 36,390 cc.
- issue 108, The model shows the version 1972 with sliding side door, while in the movie - the bus from 1971 with a conventional door.
- Issue 111, Largo's 1965 Thunderbird retains the 1964 grille from issue 42.
- Issue 113, the VAZ as featured in 'GoldenEye' has the wrong 'Lada Niva' rear badge.
- Issue 117, The Mercedes Benz Model is not of a W180 220s but a W120 180 which has indicator on side of fender near windscreen
- Issue 118, The Lada 2105 has bumpers, interior and tail lights from 2107 model.
- Issue 119: The back of the diorama for the model states the film is 'For Your Eyes Only', rather than the correct film 'Thunderball'. The Lincoln Continental limousine is poorly modelled, particularly the passenger compartment, curved shoulderline and too large taillights. The reverse lights are moulded in red instead of clear plastic.
- Issue 120: The back of the diorama has no film listed although the corresponding film was printed on the preceding issue. The model of Mercedes lacks the Locque's figure.
- Issue 121: The Volga has no front window leaves.
- Issue 122: The model of Mercedes 200D shows the 1968 version instead of 1974 facelift.
- issue 125: The model shows the long-wheelbase version of the Dodge Ram, pickup in the movie with the standard wheelbase.
- Issue 127: The Ambulance is facing the wrong direction.
- Issue 128: The Morris Minor neglects to have a registration plate present, and the folded up roof is the incorrect colour; being that of the car's body

== See also ==
- James Bond Cars
- James Bond Gadgets
- Outline of James Bond
