= Quest (British magazine) =

British technology magazine

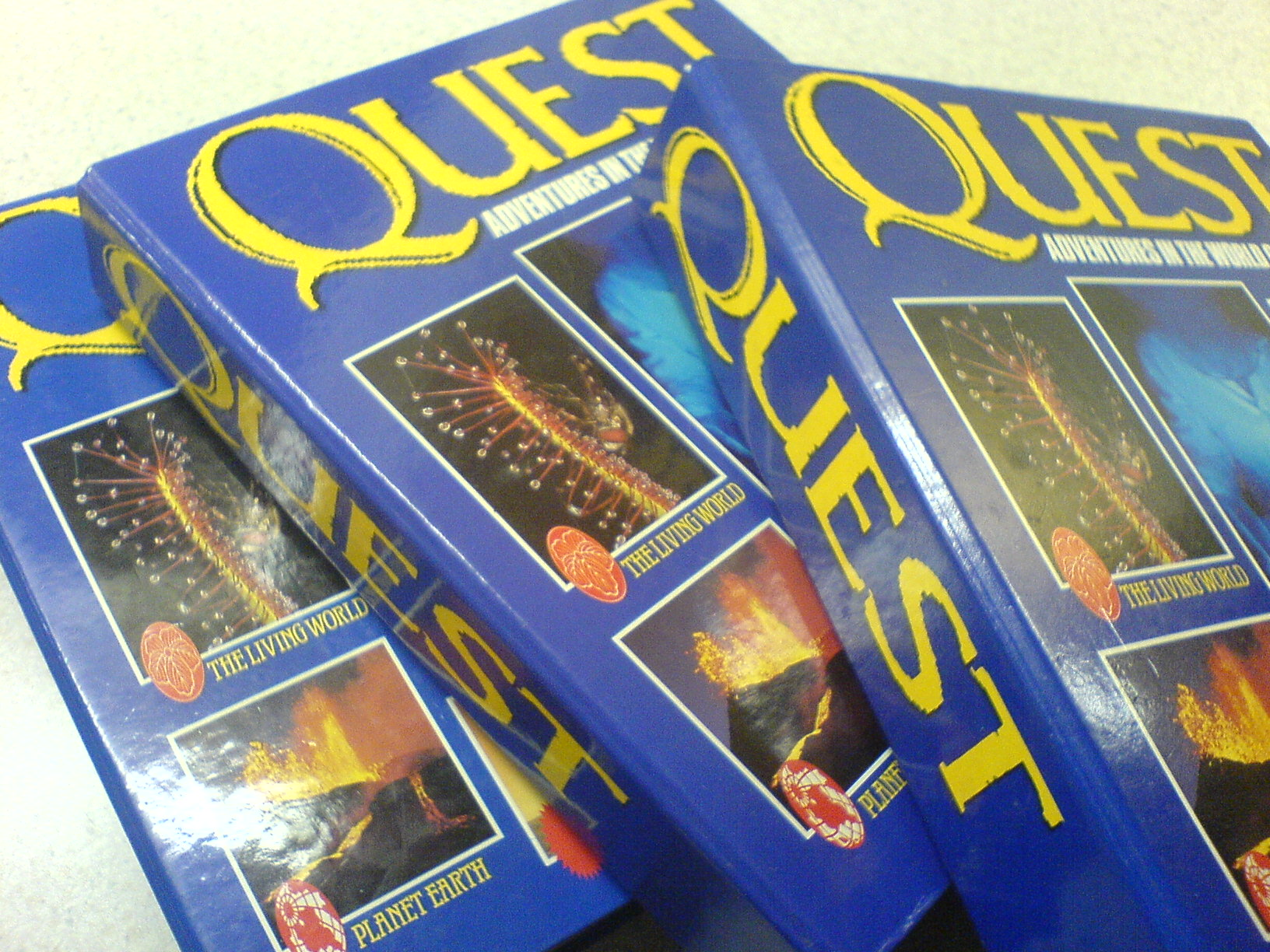

Quest was a collectable magazine published in the United Kingdom by Marshall Cavendish from the late 1980s to the early 1990s.

Quest was of their 'Partworks' educational range covering a range of science and technology related topics, such as construction, cities, transport and drugs. The articles in each part were categorized under six topics: The living world, planet Earth, futures, energy and resources, new technology, and space frontiers.

Quest was available in fortnightly, hole-punched editions which would often come with a collectable element, such as playing cards for a 'trivial pursuit-like game' or cardboard models. There were 60 regular issues – enough to fill three official binders which came with special editions of the magazine (of which there were four).

== Issues ==
| Issue | Theme |
|---|---|
| 1 | The Oceans |
| 2 | Man In Space |
| 3 | Communications |
| 4 | Crime Busters |
| 5 | Cities and Communities |
| 6 | Life Forces |
| 7 | Flight |
| 8 | Weapons |
| 9 | Food and Nutrition |
| 10 | Science and Sport |
| 11 | Weather |
| 12 | Transport |
| 13 | Construction |
| 14 | Brain Power |
| 15 | Money |
| 16 | Light and Images |
| 17 | Into The Jungle |
| 18 | Creative Forces |
| 19 | Time |
| 20 | Water of Life |
| 21 | Science of Sound |
| 22 | Farming |
| 23 | Health And Medicine |
| 24 | Computers |
| 25 | Security |
| 26 | Underground |
| 27 | Body Machine |
| 28 | Homes |
| 29 | Weapons 2 |
| 30 | Speed |
| 31 | Leisure |
| 32 | Automation |
| 33 | Rescue |
| 34 | Flight 2 |
| 35 | Into the Unknown |
| 36 | Oceans 2 |
| 37 | Engineering |
| 38 | Science Of Sport 2 |
| 39 | Materials |
| 40 | Warfare |
| 41 | Entertainment |
| 42 | Science Of Numbers |
| 43 | Inventions |
| 44 | Tools |
| 45 | Forces |
| 46 | Constructions 2 |
| 47 | The Seas |
| 48 | Art |
| 49 | Environment |
| 50 | Energy |
| 51 | Survival |
| 52 | Deserts |
| 53 | The Message |
| 54 | Transportation |
| 55 | Man In Space |
