= The Illustrated Science and Invention Encyclopedia =

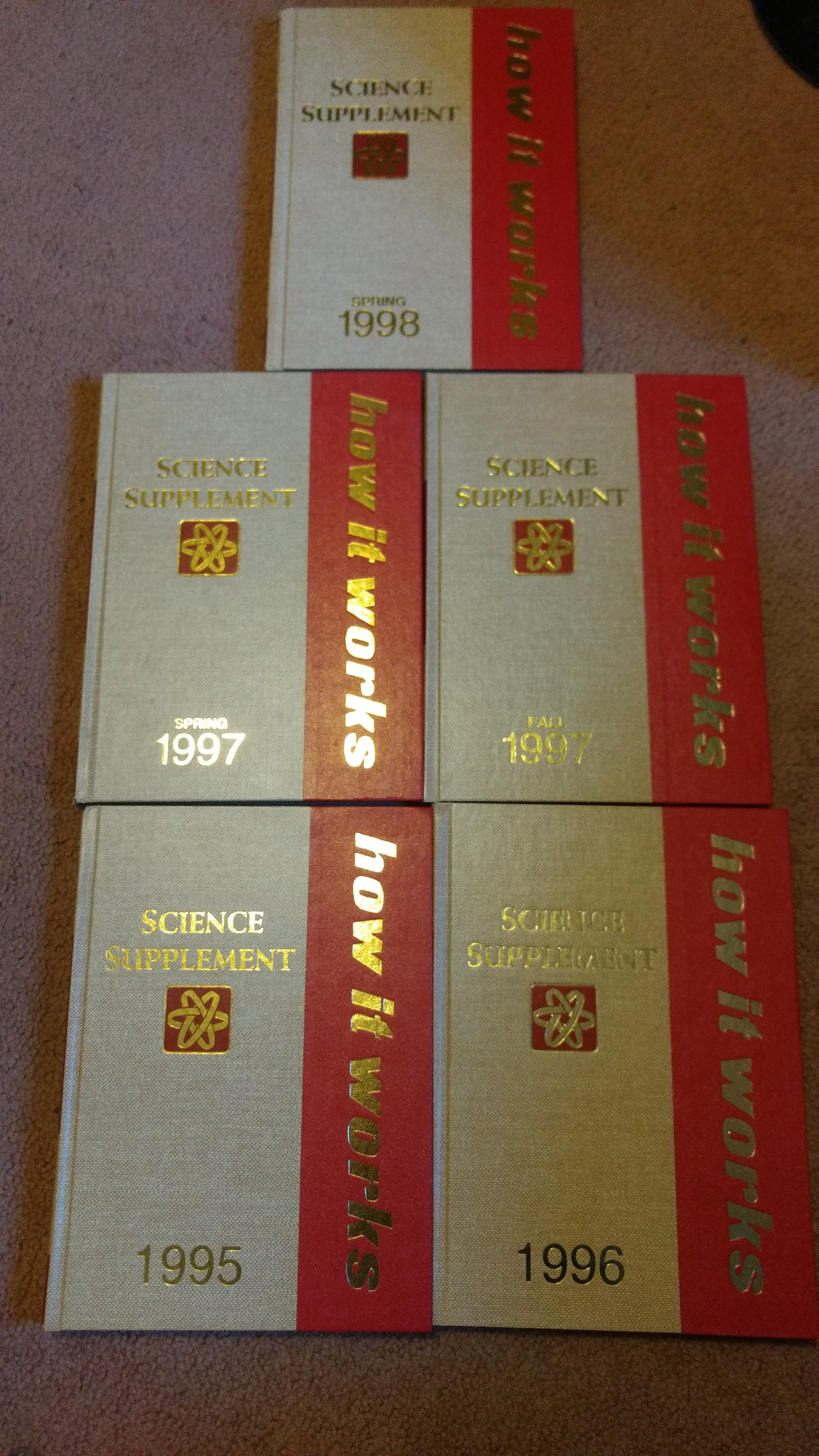
The 1995, 1996, Fall and Spring 1997, and Spring 1997 volumes of the How It Works science supplement.

The Illustrated Science and Invention Encyclopedia was an encyclopedia of books originally published in parts in the United Kingdom under the title How It Works, by Marshall Cavendish Limited, and republished in the United States in 1974 by H.S. Stuttman Publishers in Westport, Connecticut, in 21 volumes (OCLC 3643238). It was supplanted by their The New Illustrated Science and Invention Encyclopedia: How It Works, a 28 volume set edited by Donald Clarke and Mark Dartford, published in 1987 (ISBN 9780874754506) (OCLC 1333004714), and then republished in 28 volumes from 1989 to 1993 (ISBN 9780874754506),(OCLC 28822057). A 2003 edition numbered 20 volumes, and was well reviewed.

The encyclopedia was also published under the title "Science Horizons Year Books" and in a one-volume edition.
