= Purnell and Sons =

Printing company in England, 1839–2005

- Industry: Printing
- Founded: 1839
- Defunct: 2005
- Fate: Acquired
- Successor: Maxwell Communications Corporation and Polestar
- Headquarters: London, England

Purnell and Sons started out as a small family printers based in Somerset which merged with other printers over the next 100 years to become one of the largest print groups in the UK and at one time a major publisher.

== History ==
The company was founded by Charles Dando Purnell in 1839 as a small family printers with small print shops in Radstock, Midsomer Norton and Paulton. With the influence of Wilfred Harvey, who was originally the firm's accountant, Purnell & Sons grew from the 1920s onwards, with letterpress printing being added as well as a lithography department in the late 1930s. The company grew to become a major concern that published and printed millions of colour books and magazines. In 1940, Purnell took control of book publisher MacDonald.

From 1966 through 1971 Purnell & Sons printed the popular and successful Purnell's History of the Second World War and its follow-up First World War partwork series of magazines. Between them, these two publications featured in total 1163 technical illustrations by John Batchelor which cemented his reputation as Britain's premier technical illustrator for the next two decades, also including many more for subsequent publications under the Purnell imprint. In the 1960s and 1970s the company also published other partwork series including Knowledge (1962), Discovering Art (1964–66), The Masters (1965), History of the Twentieth Century (1968-70), Man, Myth and Magic (1970), Discovering Antiques (1970), A History of the English Speaking Peoples (1971), and Illustrated Encyclopedia of modern Weapons and Warfare (1978-81). The latest issues in these series would offered for sale every week or fortnight in newsagents across the world and were sold in large numbers (for example, 400,000 copies of Knowledge were printed).

With the profits made by the letterpress and lithography parts of the firm, a purpose built gravure factory was added in the early 1960s, equipped with Cerutti presses with pre-press and printing cylinder production manufactured in-house by Bristol Photo Engraving (BPE).

At its peak employing 2,000 people and at one stage being one of Europe's largest print plants, Purnell group of companies merged with Hazell Sun to form the British Printing Corporation in 1964. In 1981 Robert Maxwell, the then owner of BPC closed the letterpress department, ink factory and much reduced the Lithography department, with the loss of 800 staff.

From 1981 to final closure saw a steady decline in the once large print company and major local employer. A five-month union dispute in the gravure plant against Robert Maxwell occurred in 1986. The web offset department was closed in 1989, and all book production stopped in 1996. Many former employees had their pensions affected by the Robert Maxwell pension scandal.

The gravure plant printed many glossy Sunday colour newspaper supplements such as the Observer and the Sunday Times, catalogues such as the IKEA and of Argos, holiday brochures such as those of Cosmos Holidays and weekly magazines such as Woman's Own, Radio Times and the original UK edition of Grazia. Purnell remained faithful to web fed Cerutti presses, either 2.2m or 2.4m paper width. The final 2.4m Cerutti press was installed in 2001, which replaced an older machine, it could produce 72 A4 pages per impression, had a run speed of 50,000iph with inline stitching, with a crew of three printers and two assistants.

Other than one new press, Purnell suffered from under investment in both plant and equipment. Although the staff continued to produce high quality work on ageing presses and printing cylinder production equipment, in the end the Polestar print group opted to build a brand new plant in Sheffield. With some of the staff relocating to help set of the new plant, the print works in Paulton finally closed in December 2005 with the loss of 400 jobs.
