= The Ancestral Trail =

UK magazine

- Cover of the first issue, The Moss Beast: In the Grip of the Slime River Ghoul
- Staff writers: Fergus Fleming; Ian Probert
- Categories: Fantasy, Science fiction
- Frequency: Fortnightly
- Format: part-work A4 full color magazine
- Circulation: over 30,000,000
- Publisher: Marshall Cavendish
- First issue: 30 December 1992; 33 years ago
- Final issue Number: 7 December 1994; 31 years ago 52
- Country: United Kingdom
- Language: English

The Ancestral Trail is a now out-of-print long-form fictional story woven throughout a 52-issue partwork children's magazine series that was originally-published between 1992 and 1994 by Marshall Cavendish in the United Kingdom and Ireland, Australia and New Zealand, Malta, Malaysia, Singapore, South Africa; as well as translated versions licensed to local publishers in France, Germany (where it was titled Im Reich der Urwesen), Italy (titled La Storia Ancestrale), Spain.

Launching as a fortnightly fantasy series, The Ancestral Trail Trilogy tells the continuing adventure of a young man called Richard, who is brought to The Ancestral World to help the inhabitants of that realm to repel an occupying force known as The Evil One and restore good to the world. Originally twenty-six issues were commissioned for the part-work. After a successful first year sales, with projections reported at over 30 million copies worldwide, the series was extended to fifty-two issues, where Richard's adventures continued into a futuristic science fiction world known as the Cyber Dimension.

== Background and development ==
In 1992, The Ancestral Trail was first published by Marshall Cavendish, a UK-based publisher well known for their partwork titles, adapted from a submission by UK domiciled, South African born author Frank Graves, under agreed commission and also Shared Copyright by Marshall Cavendish and Frank Graves. ach issue featured twelve illustrations drawn and painted by Julek Heller. Author Frank Graves went on to have a series of unrelated books and story published as well as having The Ancestral Trail film offer made which he was unable to accept owing to his shared written contract with Marshall Cavendish Publishing at the time, all full rights were returned to the author by the publisher in 2017.

The Ancestral Trail was extended by a further twenty-six issues initially written by Frank Graves and then edited and written by Ian Probert. The second year extension incorporated computer-generated graphics by Mehau Kulyk with Heller's graphic work. As one of the first publications to combine paintings with digital renders, a problem arose when it was discovered that at the time there was no digital storage medium available of sufficient size capable of accommodating gigabyte-sized scans. A solution was found by scanning Heller's illustrations at a lower resolution of 200dpi (not 300dpi which is industry standard). "We spent a great deal of time worrying about the repercussions of doing this", Probert retold in a blog post years later. "Surprisingly, none of our readers noticed".

The magazine was launched with a television advertising campaign in December 1992, playing off the series tagline "an epic story of myths, monsters, and magic".

== Synopsis ==
Richard is an ordinary boy who is plucked from his normal life to save the Ancestral World. On his way home, slips and falls, causing him to black out. When he wakes, he is in the Ancestral World, where he meets an old man named Golan, the last remaining Guardian of the Ancestral World and the Keeper of the Life Force. Golan explains that Richard is the prophecised "Chosen One", and that the Ancestral World is being destroyed by a being known as The Evil One who is close to winning the battle against the forces of good.

Due to Richard's oddly-colored eyes, it is believed that he can restore the balance between good and evil: Richard's green eye sees the good side of life; his gray eye sees the evil. Golan sends Richard on a quest to recover six Life Force Pods, which have been stolen by The Evil One, as well as free seven captured Guardians. Golan equips Richard with a tunic that turns him invisible, and a powerful amulet, to help him on his quest, which he must complete in twenty-six days. During his journey through the Ancestral World, Richard crosses paths with and is subsequently accompanied by Orkan, a half-boar-, half-man-being searching for survivors of the Final Battle, and the aged dwarf Melek, a scribe who fled the Ancestral City with two books that will become invaluable throughout Richard's journey. Additional allies are encountered throughout Richard's quest, which takes him around the Ancestral World and back to the Ancestral City for a final battle with The Evil One's forces.

Unexpectedly, Richard arrives in the Cyber Dimension, a metallic world where machines rule and carbon-based organisms cannot survive, and where The Evil One resides. Before Richard can return home to Earth, he must traverse this new world populated by evil robots and life-forms who obey The Evil One. Richard encounters a droid, known as Robo, who informs him the way to leave the realm is by collecting seven Omni Pieces. Eventually Richard also meets Teeza, a silicon-based marsupial-like creature called a Wigmat, who joins Richard's journey after Richard defeats a machine who eats his people. Teeza, like Robo, can also hold Omni Pieces and becomes invaluable to Richard when Robo is lost for a portion of the journey through the Cyber Dimension. Richard also learns that The Evil One can also use the Omni Pieces to open a gateway to Earth, leaving it ripe for his conquest.

== The Ancestral World – issues 1–26 ==
The first issue of The Ancestral Trail, titled The Moss Beast, was bundled with a four-panel presentation folder which outlined the series and a short prologue which set up the ongoing storyline.

Date	Issue	Title	Subtitle
30 December 1992	#1	The Moss Beast	In the Grip of the Slime River Ghoul
13 January 1993	#2	Tolosh of the Garoon	Mortal Danger in Enchanted Waters
27 January 1993	#3	Baal the Giant Spider	Caught in a Sticky Web of Evil
10 February 1993	#4	Mirra the Magician	Battle of Wits in the City of Stone
24 February 1993	#5	Boltor, Bird of Thunder	Air-Attack over Desert Wastes
10 March 1993	#6	Cozards and Killer Bees	Death Squads in the Dying Woods
24 March 1993	#7	Zock, Cannibal Chief	Trapped in the Caves of Flesh-Eating Dwarfs
7 April 1993	#8	Enlil's Dungeon	Dicing with Death in the bubbling Cauldron
21 April 1993	#9	Living Death Traps	Caught in the Jaws of Killer Plants
5 May 1993	#10	Zibella's Fortress	Sorcery and Witchcraft in the watery Depths
19 May 1993	#11	Klaw, Servant of Evil	Battling the Army of Bonemen
2 June 1993	#12	Scorpions of the Desert	Deadly Guards of the Sandy Fortress
16 June 1993	#13	Dragora's Inner Sanctum	Fight to the Death in Cobra's Keep
30 June 1993	#14	Hulkan, the Mole Monster	Under Attack from the Mud Warriors
7 July 1993	#15	Narkum, the Fly-King	At the Mercy of the fiendish Spy-Master
21 July 1993	#16	Cragmar, Man of Stone	A Fatal Mistake on Plunderer's Plateau
4 August 1993	#17	Gator, Reptile Warrior	Battle for Power in the Shadowy Swamps
18 August 1993	#18	Kronis, the Winged Lion	Fight for Freedom in the Whispering Maze
1 September 1993	#19	Nemis, Master of the Deep	In the Merman's Underwater Prison
15 September 1993	#20	Spector, Keeper of the Ice Kingdom	Trapped in the Wastes of Frigoria
29 September 1993	#21	Stridor, Lord of the Snowy Mountains	Facing up to the White Death
13 October 1993	#22	Zyton and the Curse of Loktar	Sinister Steps in the Chambers of Fear
27 October 1993	#23	Dagmar, Demon of Fire	Flames of Fury over Yellow Stone Peaks
10 November 1993	#24	Syrus, Spirit of the Sky	Devilish Dealings with a Devious Genie
24 November 1993	#25	Fenrar, the Desert Stalker	Danger and Deceit at Dead River Sands
8 December 1993	#26	The Evil One	Fight to the Finish in the Final Battle

== The Cyber Dimension – issues 27–52 ==
Date	Issue	Title	Subtitle
22 December 1993	#27	Tengam, Gravity Defier	Clash of Metal with a Cyber Warrior
5 January 1994	#28	Zenon, Laser Lancer	In the Clutches of the Creature of Light
19 January 1994	#29	Flector, Hi-Speed Solar Cruiser	Battle of Wits with an Airborne Assassin
2 February 1994	#30	Mortex, Molten Trail Blazer	White Hot Terror in the Tunnels of Doom
16 February 1994	#31	Holotron, Dynamic Deceiver	Battle of Wits with a Shape Shifter
2 March 1994	#32	Husasan, Silicon Samurai	Dual of Doom with an Android Warrior
16 March 1994	#33	Terraforma, Environmorpher	Trapped in the Lair of the Land Changer
30 March 1994	#34	Toxis, Poison Predator	Caught in the Grip of the Slime Creature
13 April 1994	#35	Identico, Deadly Replicator	Lost in the Factory of Dreams
27 April 1994	#36	Scordef, Sinister Supervirus	Hypnotized by an Evil Computer Virus
11 May 1994	#37	Cronid, Micro Creature	Horror of the Cyber Insects
25 May 1994	#38	Mescon, Menacing Multi-Form	Caged by the Galactic Zoo Keeper
8 June 1994	#39	Proton, Power Android	Tank Battle on the Cyber Plains
22 June 1994	#40	Kentar, Cyber Demon	Fight to the Finish in the Cyber Skies
6 July 1994	#41	Continuuma, Empress of Time	Kidnapped by the Controller of Time
20 July 1994	#42	Tyrannix, Robo-Dinosaur	Peril in the Jungles of the Robot King
3 August 1994	#43	Galaxia, Anti-Matter Alien	Marooned in the Domain of Terror
17 August 1994	#44	Quasar, Faceless Fiend	Sieged by a Savage Super Being
31 August 1994	#45	Cortix, Mind Master	Duel of Minds in Computer City
14 September 1994	#46	Hydron, Mercury Monster	Return to the Perilous Sea of Mercury
28 September 1994	#47	Mandelbiot, Fearsome Fractal	Fatal Fury of the Deadly Digital Demon
12 October 1994	#48	Pixar, Particle Blaster	Evil Revenge in the City of the Lost
26 October 1994	#49	Malachit, Evil Incinerator	Plasma Attack of the Cyber Warrior
9 November 1994	#50	Robo, Robotic Betrayer	Friend Becomes Foe in Battle to the End
23 November 1994	#51	Vileeon, Cyber Judge	Trapped in the Court of the Cyber Citadel
7 December 1994	#52	The Evil One	Final Battle with the King of Cyber World

== Additional magazine content ==
Every issue of The Ancestral Trail was augmented with additional print content to engage the reader. The inner front cover of each installment featured a prophecy which referred to the events of that tale, these were later replaced by binary messages from a screen that appears on Robo's chest. Decoding the binary message reveals the weakness of that issue's main villain. Various tasks were included in the issues including spotting hidden artwork, such as the characters of Shoomi and Shoobi, two friendly amphibian creatures who quietly followed Richard on his quest and who could be seen around two times in every issue. Fragments of the Evil One's mask and random other 'canon' imagery were also hidden in the background art, as well as then-contemporary computing tech within the Cyber Dimension artwork.

Within the inside flap back cover of each issue, as well as aerial fragments of a graphic map, enabling the reader to create an illustrated layout of the Ancestral World. Information cards were printed in each issue which outline the real world legends that the series' antagonists were based upon. These cards were replaced by 'Techscan Cards', which told the reader about various scientific principles and theories. Role-playing games based on the content were generated from both free trump card sets bundled with each issue and later printed within the inside cover. A single letter block would appear in each issue, generating an anagram needed to be solved to win a competition – the prize was an Atari ST computer for the first half of the magazine's run, and a Sega Mega Drive for the second half.

== Magazine afterlife ==
In 1994, a graphic adventure computer game derived from La Storia Ancestrale (the Italian translation) was developed for both the MS-DOS and Amiga formats by the Italian company Hobby & Work. The Amiga version was never released due to the hardware being withdrawn from the Italian market, but the DOS version was published in a collection of floppy disks that were paired with the magazine. Additionally, an animated series was proposed for development by Saban International. After Marshall Cavendish closed its partwork division in 2002, all rights and International Publication Rights and Copyright to the series were returned to Frank Graves, who subsequently self-published his own adaption of the revised part-work narrative across three books in trilogy format, titled The Ancestral Trail; Long Ago & Far Away, New Time & Time Again and a newly written Once Upon a Time & Time Again.
