= The Third Reich Series =

Series of books

The Third Reich
- Edited by: John R. Elting, Charles Victor Pennington von Luttichau, et al.
- Illustrator: John Batchelor, et al.
- Cover artist: various
- Country: Alexandria, Virginia, US; London,UK; Barcelona, Spain
- Language: en-us, en-uk, es
- Genre: History
- Publisher: Time-Life Books. Inc. Caxton Publishing Group; Ediciones Folio, S.A. Hainan Publishing House
- Published: 1988-2009
- Published in English: 1988-1991
- Media type: print
- No. of books: 21; 7 (UK); 24 (Spain); 21 (China)
- OCLC: 44777881

The Third Reich is a series of books published by Time-Life Books that chronicles the rise and fall of Nazi Germany, relating historical events as experienced by the German side. The series began its release run on the home market from 1988 onward, followed a year later by a European dissemination release, typically by series subscription through the "Time-Life Books B.V." Amsterdam-branch subsidiary, among others in the UK. Each book focused on a different topic, such as the SS, Afrika Korps and various campaigns.

== Release overview ==
Each volume in the series was 192 pages in length, heavily illustrated and with pictorial essays on specific topics within the volume. Each book was executed in faux black leatherette with silver and red text imprints, and featured a large glued-on picture on its front. The books were issued without a dust jacket. Each volume came additionally with a bookmark/map key insert explaining the military symbology used on the maps as featured in the series.

The overall Editor-in-Chief for the series was the renowned military historian Col. John R. Elting, who was already a regular contributing editor on Time Life's prior World War II (the de facto progenitor series for The Third Reich publication) and The Civil War series. The second-most prolific series contributor concerned American military historian Charles Victor Pennington von Luttichau, who was singularly well suited to serve as such as he had been a participant on the German side in several of the campaigns covered in the series as a Luftwaffe antiaircraft officer during the war; shortly before the outbreak of war his American mother managed to evade Nazi Germany, but her son was not able to, resulting in that he became drafted by the Wehrmacht.

The technical hardware illustrations were done by John Batchelor, a renowned British technical illustrator of the era.

=== International editions ===
In stark contrast to the World War II progenitor series (which had seen a plethora of international editions in translation), there are only two other international editions of The Third Reich known. The first one concerned the later UK-specific first print versions with redesigned covers and newly assigned ISBNs published by the London-based Caxton Publishing Group, who partially reissued the series (British-spelled this time around, contrary to the ones released earlier by Time-Life themselves) on their home market in the years 2004-06 for sale through the regular bookstore retail channel. They did so under a full license from the Amsterdam "Time-Life Books B.V." European branch (as specified in the colophons of the UK volumes), which had managed to stay in business a few years longer after its American "Time Life Books, Inc." mother division had gone defunct in 2001 as a dedicated book publisher. Contrary to the US home market version these volume releases were issued with dust jackets, indicative of being from the start destined for the regular bookstore channel.

Two other-language editions are known to have been released: The first had been the 2000-2001 Chinese-language 第三帝国 (Dì sān dìguó) release by Haikou, China-based licensee Hainan Publishing House, and which was reissued in whole in 2015 with new cover illustrations and new ISBNs. Both Chinese issues were released in the paperback format, contrary to all other editions. The second other-language edition concerned the 2008-09 Spanish-language El III Reich y Hitler series released by Time-Life Books' regular go-to licensee in Spain, Barcelona-based Ediciones Folio, S.A. likewise fully licensed by "Direct Holdings Holland B.V." (the Dutch branch of the worldwide holding company that had acquired Time Life in December 2003) per the book colophons, as Time-Life Books B.V. had by then become defunct as well – likewise with radically redesigned covers. Noteworthy was, that the Spanish edition had three 248-page UK/non-Time-Life pedigree volumes included which had been lacking from the originating English-language release; the first "Hitler: máquina de guerra" title by William Carr (ISBN 9788441327856) had originally been the "Hitler's War Machine" release (OCLC 2585107) from 1975. The second by military historian Christopher Chant authored "Los generales de Hitler" (ISBN 9788441327153) actually concerned his older "Hitler's Generals and Their Battles" title (ISBN 0890090491) he had already written in 1976. The third "La Luftwaffe de Hitler" (ISBN 9788441327849) title by historians Bill Gunston and Tony Wood, had likewise been a reissue of their older "Hitler's Luftwaffe" book (ISBN 0517224771) from 1977.

Interested customers in other-language territories elsewhere were, alongside their 1990s UK and Spanish contemporary counterparts, offered the opportunity to acquire the original American version via mail through their nearest Time Life Books subsidiary, the aforementioned Time-Life Books B.V. in particular, typically by series subscription.

Volume titles of The Third Reich
Title (Note: Two further titles have been reported for a slated release as well, Empires in the East and Homeland Besieged – having already been furnished with their own respective "080947025X". and "0809470209". ISBNs on Amazon.com – but the series was suspended indefinitely before they could be issued resulting in that no bibliographical data are recorded in the Library of Congress.)	Consultants/Authors	Volume	Year published (US, UK)	ISBN (US, UK 1st printing (Note: As was customary for Time-Life Books, each of the US first-print series volumes were furbished with two ISBNs (the second one usually eight numbers higher), with the lower number indicating the retail/Direct-to-Customer (DTC) copies whereas the higher ones indicate the library binding (lib. bdg.) copies as specified in the book colophons – which remained adhered to for later with higher newly assigned ISBNs endowed revised editions as well, if there were any. Listed in the table are the lower US first-print retail ISBNs and the UK specific first-print ISBNs.))
The SS	George H. Stein	01	1988, 2004	ISBN 0809469502, 1844470733
Fists of Steel	George H. Stein	02	1988	ISBN 0809469669
Storming to Power	William Sheridan Allen	03	1989	ISBN 0809469545
Wolf Packs	Timothy Patrick Mulligan	04	1989, 2004	ISBN 0809469758, 184447075X
The Reach for Empire	Gerhard L. Weinberg	05	1989, 2006	ISBN 0809469588, 1844470784
The New Order	William Sheridan Allen	06	1989, 2006	ISBN 0809469626, 1844470776
Afrikakorps	Williamson Murray	07	1990	ISBN 0809469839
The Twisted Dream	Robert G. L. Waite	08	1990	ISBN 0809470004
Barbarossa	Charles V.P. von Luttichau, Williamson Murray	09	1990	ISBN 080946991X
The Southern Front	Charles V.P. von Luttichau	10	1991	ISBN 0809470160
War on the High Seas	Robert O. Dulin, Jr., William H. Garske, Jr., Charles S. Thomas, Charles V. P. Luttichau	11	1990, 2004	ISBN 0809469952, 1844470741
Lightning War	Charles V.P. von Luttichau, Williamson Murray	12	1989	ISBN 0809469707
Conquest of The Balkans	Charles V.P. von Luttichau, Williamson Murray	13	1990	ISBN 0809469790
The Center of the Web	Peter Hoffmann, Robert G. L. Waite	14	1991	ISBN 0809469871
Apparatus of Death	John M. Bridgman, Sybil Milton	15	1991	ISBN 0809470047
Road to Stalingrad	Charles V.P. von Luttichau	16	1991, 2004	ISBN 0809481502, 1844470725
The Heel of the Conqueror	Norman Rich	17	1991	ISBN 0809470128
Fortress Europe	John M. Bridgman	18	1991	ISBN 0809470330
Scorched Earth	Charles V.P. von Luttichau	19	1991	ISBN 0809470292
The Shadow War	Charles V.P. von Luttichau	20	1991	ISBN 080947008X
Descent Into Nightmare	Charles V.P. von Luttichau	21	1991, 2004	ISBN 0809470373, 1844470709

=== Spin-off ===
Contrary to several other Time Life Books history series, no spin-offs from this particular series are known, save one; it turned out that Time Life had been commissioned by the BBC to sell their 1997 six-part The Nazis: A Warning from History documentary series on DVD in North America. For the BBC's North American July 2006 four-disc DVD set release, Time Life provided retail distribution and promotional services, which included at least one television commercial.

== Promotion ==
Time Life Books' usual standard operating procedure in the late 1970s and 1980s to promote their book series was to embark on a vigorous television ad campaign in the form of a series of commercials transmitted either in first-run syndication or during late-night television programming. This was complementary to their standard practice of sending out elaborate multi-sheet mailings to their already existing customer base, in which a series was introduced in detail to a potential subscriber; having taken out a subscription once, a customer was then registered in Time Life Books' customer database, at the time a crucial business model marketing tool for the company, making that customer eligible for receiving the company's mailings henceforth.

However, in this particular case though, Time Life appeared to have taken a more low-key approach because of the sensitive nature of the series' subject matter, particularly restraining themselves in regard to television ads, as very few were aired, though there is at least one known. That one commercial was subdued in comparison to Time Life's sensationalized commercial made a decade earlier for "The Nazis" volume of the progenitor World War II series, or even the later one they did for BBC's above-referenced The Nazis: A Warning from History documentary series.

As was customary for Time Life Books at the time, the first book ordered (typically volume 1 in this case) was sent on a ten-day trial basis at a reduced price, after which each bi-monthly next installment could be assessed by customers on the same basis. That first book came additionally with a free bonus gift in the form of a facsimile reproduction – taken from the in the Imperial War Museum kept only known surviving original – of Hitler's 31 August 1939 four-page "Anweisung Nr. 1", considered his very first wartime general directive to his armed forces. The four single print pages came along with an extra publisher's note and translation double print page in a document folder adorned with the Nazi eagle. Customers were allowed to keep the reproduction even if they decided to return the volume it came with.
