= Purnell's History of the Second World War =

Purnell's History of the Second World War was a weekly anthology or 'partwork' publication covering the Second World War that was distributed throughout the English-speaking world. Produced shortly before the similar 8-volume series on the First World War, it was first published in 1966, being reprinted several times during the 1970s. The magazine was notable for its use of many writers, often well-known military figures, of many nationalities. This was combined with original artwork of the military hardware used, maps, and unseen photographs, some of them quite gruesome.

== Background ==
Despite the name, Purnell's History of the Second World War was published by Phoebus Publishing Ltd in co-operation with the Imperial War Museum, which provided its research facilities, expert advice, official statistics and photographs. The defunct Purnell & Sons, later British Printing Corporation, based in Paulton, Avon (Now Bath & North East Somerset), were the printers of the magazine. At the time, Purnell's were one of the largest and most advanced printing plants in Europe, and had developed a reputation for high quality printing, producing well-known titles such as the Observer Magazine and the TV Times.

== Editorial stance ==
The editor, Barrie Pitt, had been involved in the production of the BBC Television series The Great War. Pitt and the editor in chief, the renowned military theorist and historian Sir Basil Liddel Hart, wanted to create a definitive record of the Second World War which could withstand academic scrutiny and be accessible to the general public. Each issue of the magazine contained articles on differing topics but typically, important or contentious events were viewed from both sides (e.g. Stalingrad: The German View, followed by another article, Stalingrad: The Russian View) to allow the writers to counter long held myths and set the record straight rather than merely to recycle familiar themes. Numerous famous military figures and former senior staff officers contributed articles; because it was originally published just over twenty years after the end of the conflict, many of the protagonists were alive.

== Former combatants who wrote for the magazine ==
- (Nazi Germany) Walter Chales de Beaulieu
- (United Kingdom) Eric Dorman O'Gowan
- (Nazi Germany) Friedrich v. d. Heydte
- (United Kingdom) Alun G. Jones, Baron Chalfont
- (Nazi Germany) Alfred Philippi
- (Soviet Union) Nikolai Popel
- (United Kingdom) James Louis Moulton
- (Soviet Union) Ivan Konev
- (Nazi Germany) Walter Warlimont
- (Soviet Union) Georgy Zhukov

== Other contributors ==
Prominent historians such as John Keegan, Jerrard Tickell, W.H. Koch, Alvin D. Coox, Phyllis Auty, Martin Blumenson, Antony Brett-James, John Vader, Rudolf Bohmer, Raleigh Trevelyan produced articles, as well as AJP Taylor, who acted as editor in chief for later editions after the death of Sir Basil Liddel Hart. Other well-known contributors to the publication included the MP Alan Clark and the best-selling author Dudley Pope. Witness accounts from otherwise anonymous individuals, such as a Japanese housewife telling of the horrors of life after the surrender and the testimony of a former Zero pilot, were also included. John Batchelor contributed 1,163 illustrations, which cemented his reputation as Britain's foremost technical illustrator of the period for the next two decades.

== Cold war ==
Despite the efforts to tell the story from alternative viewpoints, many of the events being discussed remained controversial and sensitive subjects, and there was still scope for Cold War propaganda and government censorship to find its way into print. In issue 45, which covered the Katyn Massacre, the discovery of the bodies of several thousand captured Polish officers in 1943, which was widely believed to have been carried out by the Soviets and which remained an unmentionable subject between the Allies after the war, the historian Jerrard Tickell attempted to reconstruct the events around the atrocity which took place at the Hill of Goats site. While pointing to the evidence, he left his conclusion open ended, finishing with the comment that it was up to the reader to form an opinion. His article was followed by a piece by a Soviet scientist purporting to be a forensic re-examination of all the evidence such as the conditions of the bodies, their levels of decomposition and the remaining artefacts to 'prove' that the Polish officers could have only been murdered during the period of the German occupation of the region. Using witness accounts, selective testimonies and the findings of the official Russian investigation into the affair, Doctor of Juridical Sciences Arkady Poltorak finished with the paragraph,

Thus was unmasked the provocative act of the Nazis, thus was established with complete clarity the fact of the monstrous killing by the Nazi authorities of Polish prisoners of war at Katyn Wood

During the Perestroika period in the early 1990s, the Russian authorities finally admitted that the killings had been carried out by the NKVD, the secret police organization used to enforce Stalin's rule.

== Later editions ==
The series was so successful that although it was initially scheduled to run to six volumes of 16 issues each, a further two volumes were added, covering later themes such as the Chinese Civil War, the Arab–Israeli Conflict, Suez, Korean War, Vietnam War, and the rise of nationalism which led to the end of the European empires in the years after the Second World War. There were also discussions on the spread of communism, tactics and battle strategy, the post war reconstruction, the use of propaganda, the work of war correspondents and artists, profiles of the leading politicians, generals and ambassadors and features on uniforms and medals. While the editorial comment justified this move as important for the reader to gain a rounded view of all the inter-connected events, it could also be considered a sound business move to extract as much financial reward for the publishers as possible. A series of higher quality 'specials' were also later produced which were themselves hugely successful, selling over 8 million copies world wide. They were about elements of the Second World War and the First World War, e.g., Battleships of the First World War, The Desert War, German Secret Weapons, D Day: Invasion of Hitler's Europe and German Tanks 1939–1945. While popular, they included a great deal of material published in the main magazine. Though the magazine is long out of print, it is remembered as largely achieving what it set out to do and back issues are sought after.

== Titles ==
Volume 1

- 1 "Blitzkrieg!"
- 2 "Hitler: The New Messiah / Sinking of the Graf Spee"
- 3 "The Germans Strike North"
- 4 "Glider Strike on World's Strongest Fort / The Balance of Arms Assessed / Hitler's Troops Crush Norway"
- 5 "Invasion of Holland and Belgium, Panzers Break Through At Sedan"
- 6 "Dunkirk"
- 7 "The Fall of France"
- 8 "Operation Sea Lion: The Plan to Invade Britain"
- 9 "The Battle of Britain"
- 10 "Italian Fiasco: The Attack On Greece"
- 11 "Menace at Sea"
- 12 "Victory in the Desert"
- 13 "Rommel: The Desert Fox"
- 14 "Hitler's Revenge on Yugoslavia"
- 15 "Hitler Drives the Allies Out of Greece"
- 16 "The Sinking of the Bismarck"

Volume 2

- 17 "Civilians in the Front Line"
- 18 "How Crete Was Lost"
- 19 "Desert Tragedy: Frenchman Fights Frenchman in Syria"
- 20 "Duels with the Afrika Korps"
- 21 "Operation Barbarossa"
- 22 "Barbarossa!"
- 23 "Russia Blunts the Blitzkrieg"
- 24 "Target Rommel"
- 25 "Pearl Harbor"
- 26 "Malaya"
- 27 "Battle For Moscow"
- 28 "Hit and Run: The Big Commando Raids Begin"
- 29 "The General Who Never Lost a Battle"
- 30 "1000 Bomber Raid"
- 31 "Corregidor"
- 32 "Banzai!"

Volume 3

- 33 "Showdown At Midway"
- 34 "Tobruk Falls"
- 35 "The Siege of Sebastopol"
- 36 "First Alamein"
- 37 "Suicide Invasion: What Went Wrong at Dieppe?"
- 38 "Stalingrad"
- 39 "Alamein"
- 40 "Guadalcanal"
- 41 "Operation Torch"
- 42 "Life in France"
- 43 "Scrap the Battle Fleet"
- 44 "Death of an Army"
- 45 "The Crime at Katyn Wood"
- 46 "Tunisia: The Noose Tightens / Guadalcanal: Slaughter at Sea"
- 47 "Wingate: Minus Myth"
- 48 "Africa: The End"

Volume 4

- 49 "Battle for the Sealanes"
- 50 "The Greatest Tank Battle in History"
- 51 "Italians Quit"
- 52 "Allies Invade Italy"
- 53 "'The Bolshevik Horde'"
- 54 "Did the Germans Stop Monty?"
- 55 "War at the Top"
- 56 "Guadalcanal to Bougainville"
- 57 "Marines at Tarawa!"
- 58 "Was Anzio Worth It?"
- 59 "Cassino Falls"
- 60 "RAF Raider Destroyed"
- 61 "Kohima and Imphal"
- 62 "Pre D–Day: Hitler's Fortress Europe"
- 63 "Pre D–Day: The Allied War Machine"
- 64 "Pre D–Day: Europe's Secret Armies"

Volume 5

- 65 "D–Day"
- 66 "Battle of the Hedgerows"
- 67 "The Great Marianas Turkey Shoot"
- 68 "The Bomb Plot"
- 69 "The Red Army Bursts into Poland"
- 70 "Allies Smash Two German Armies"
- 71 "Prisoner on the Kwai"
- 72 "Paris Freed!"
- 73 "Arnhem"
- 74 "Inside the Camps"
- 75 "The Incredible Career of Richard Sorge, Stalin's Man in Tokyo"
- 76 "The Strange Career and Spectacular Death of the Tirpitz"
- 77 "The Soviet View of 'Liberation'"
- 78 "The Red Army's Drive to the Gates of Berlin"
- 79 "Bombing: Did it Work? Was it Justified?"
- 80 "Battle of the Bulge: Hitler's Last Gamble"

Volume 6

- 81 "Battle of the Bulge: The Allies Hit Back"
- 82 "Iwo Jima"
- 83 "Whatever the enemy does, he can never reckon on a capitulation. Never! Never! Never!"
- 84 "Victory in Italy"
- 85 "Into the Heart of Hitler's Reich"
- 86 "Fall of Berlin"
- 87 "Hitler Dead – Doenitz Appointed Fuhrer"
- 88 "Fire Raids On Japan"
- 89 "Cult of the Kamikazes"
- 90 "The Race to Rangoon"
- 91 "Japan's Last Hope: 28 Million Volunteers"
- 92 "Hiroshima, Nagasaki"
- 93 "The War: An Overview"
- 94 "Blister Gas, Chlorine gas, Blood gas, Nerve gas. Why were they never used?"
- 95 "Tanks, Guns, Men"
- 96 "Index"

Volume 7

- 97 "The World and the Bomb"
- 98 "The Perils of Peace"
- 99 "Big Four Take Over"
- 100 "Facing Up To Defeat"
- 101 "Brave New World?"
- 102 "The Propaganda War"
- 103 "Hitler's Foreign Legions"
- 104 "U-Boat"
- 105 "Dambusters"
- 106 "Heraldry of War"
- 107 "Waffen-SS"
- 108 "Czechoslovakia Fights Back"
- 109 "Belsen"
- 110 "The Soldier"
- 111 "Life At Home"
- 112 "The Leaders and their Generals"

Volume 8

- 113 "Chiang and His Generals"
- 114 "Diplomacy In War"
- 115 "Strategy & Tactics"
- 116 "Forts"
- 117 "Trials at Nuremberg"
- 118 "Struggle Over Israel"
- 119 "France Retreats From Empire"
- 120 "Indonesia"
- 121 "Vietnam's Fight for Freedom"
- 122 "The Spread of Communism"
- 123 "The Years of Reconstruction"
- 124 "Artists at War"
- 125 "Mao's Victory"
- 126 "The Violent Peace"
- 127 "Chronology 1933–1944"
- 128 "Chronology 1945–1949 & Bibliography"

== Similar or related works ==
- Allies at War by Tim Bouverie (2025)
- The Second World War by Antony Beevor (2012).
- Inferno: The World at War, 1939-1945 by Max Hastings (2011).
- The Storm of War by Andrew Roberts (2009).
