= Knowledge (partwork) =

Encyclopedia

First issue of Knowledge, 9 January 1961

Knowledge was a British weekly educational magazine for children which was assembled in blue binders into an encyclopedia. It was published by Purnell and Sons between 1961 and 1966. Knowledge was a British version of the Italian magazine Conoscere, published by Fratelli Fabbri Editori of Milan since 1958, which was adapted into several other languages and distributed in several countries in the 1960s and 1970s.

== History and profile ==
=== Origins ===
Knowledge was a British version of the Italian magazine Conoscere published by Fratelli Fabbri Editori of Milan since 1958. The concept of a British edition had first been pitched to Fleetway Publications Ltd who turned it down, fearing it would damage sales of their own The Children's Encyclopædia and The Children's Newspaper. Following the success of Knowledge, Fleetway brought out Look and Learn in 1962.

External videos
- 1961: presenting the French version of the Italian encyclopaedia Conoscere in Paris
- "Da Milano a Parigi",3 November 1961, Archivio Luce Cinecittà on YouTube, 29 June April 2012 (in Italian).

The British magazine was launched by Purnell and Sons on 9 January 1961, as "Knowledge: the new colour magazine which grows into an encyclopædia" (subsequently "the colour magazine which grows into an encyclopædia") at a price of two shillings per issue (the pre-decimal equivalent of 10p; a later re-issued run was priced as 2/6 or 12½p).

Later that year, in October 1961, the presentation of the first issue of the French edition, Tout l'Univers, at the Palais de Chaillot in Paris, was related with great pomp by Italian newsreels.

=== Publication ===
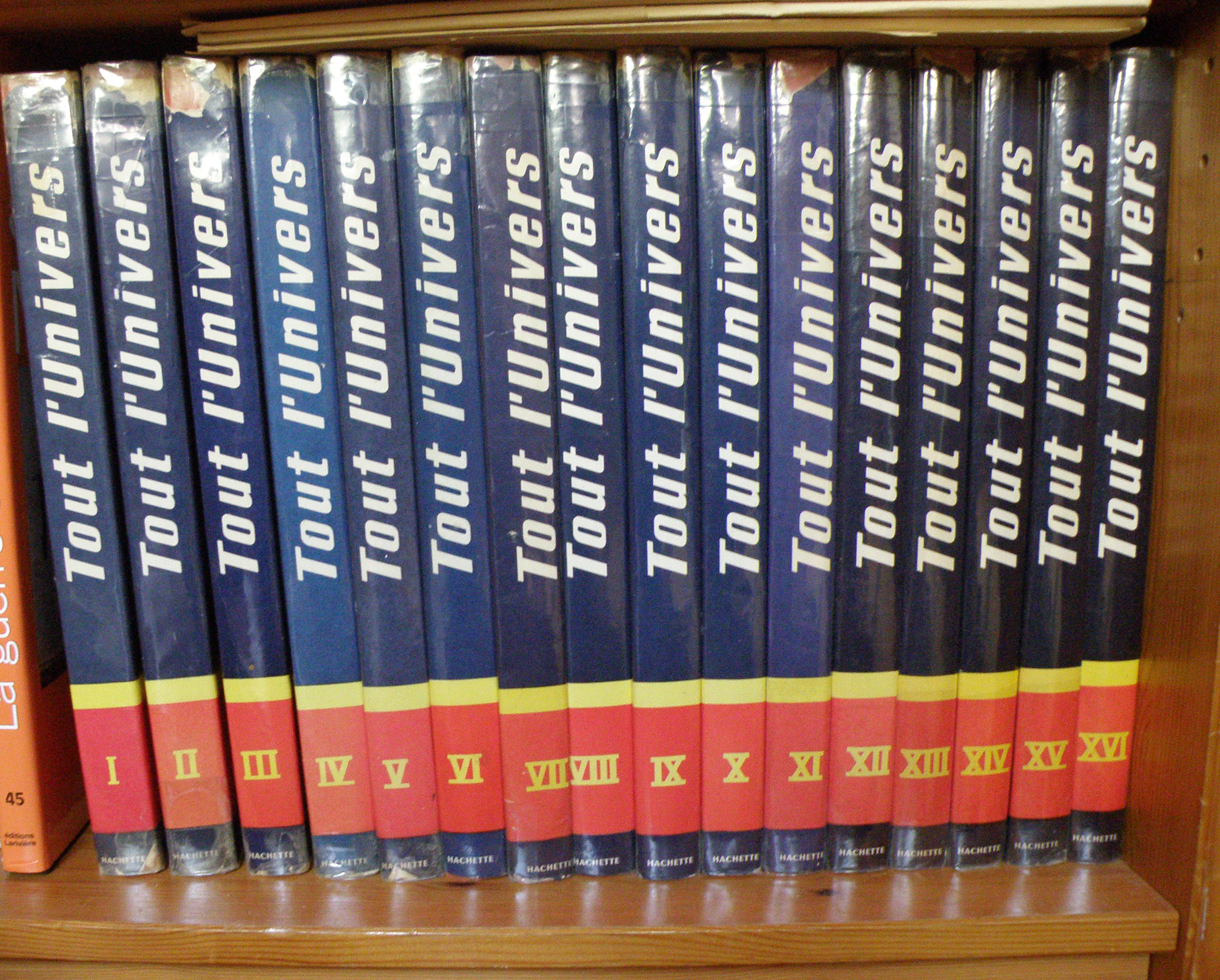
A bound collection of Tout l'Univers, the French version of Conoscere

Sixteen volumes of twelve issues of Knowledge each were initially planned, but two additional volumes brought the total to eighteen. There was also a four-volume alphabetical topic guide in slightly smaller yellow binders, also assembled from parts inserted into the main magazine.

The majority of the covers of the first 192 issues (volumes 1-16) were the work of illustrator Alessandro Fedini, but the covers of the additional issues 193-216 (volumes 17 and 18) depicted twentieth-century events and news headlines.

Knowledge sold 400,000 copies and was edited by John Paget Chancellor (1927–2014), son of Sir Christopher Chancellor, father of actress Anna Chancellor and financial historian Edward Chancellor, and brother of journalist Alexander Chancellor. The advisory editorial board of Knowledge was Christopher N. L. Brooke M.A., Violet Bonham Carter D.B.E, Norman Fisher M.A., Walter Hamilton M.A., John Sparrow M.A., L. Dudley Stamp C.B.E. D.Sc., and George Thomson F.R.S. D.Sc. In later editions John Chancellor became editor-in-chief with William Armstrong B.A. as editor and Christopher Falkus B.A. (son of Hugh Falkus) as assistant editor.

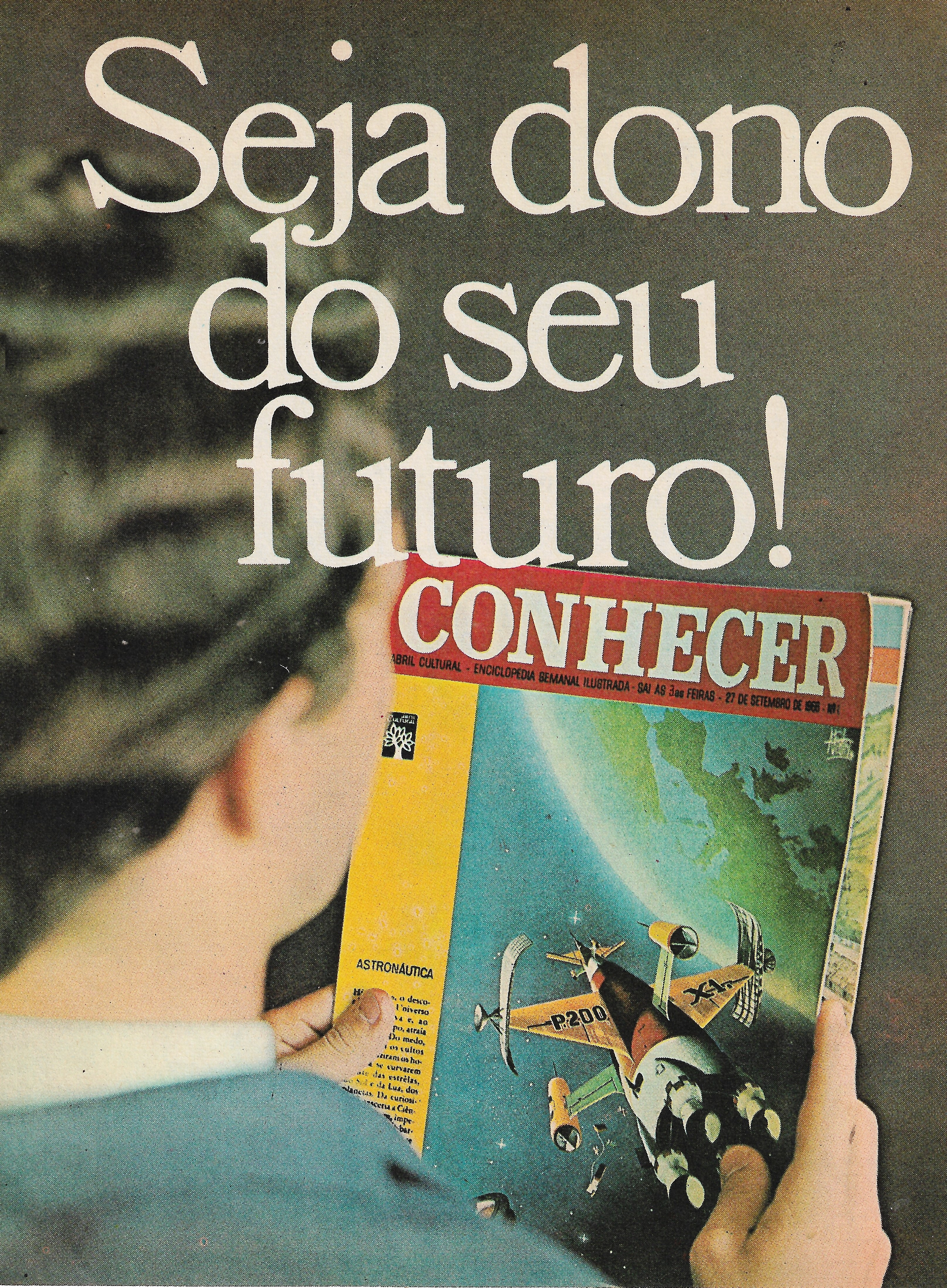
1966 advertisement for Conhecer, the Brazilian version of Conoscere: "Be the master of your future!"

It was also printed and published as a set of 18 hardcover books, Knowledge: the new colour encyclopaedia (Volumes I–XVIII), that came with an index of all 18 volumes in a separate booklet.

The British magazine Knowledge ceased publication in 1966. Elsewhere in the world, adaptations of Conoscere were only just beginning, with the Brazilian edition Conhecer launching in the 1966, the same year that the British version saw its last issue. The Afrikaans edition Kennis commenced publication in Cape Town and Pretoria in 1974. Hachette in France has continued releasing various editions of Tout l'Univers since 1961.

== International distribution ==
Conoscere had versions translated into several languages, including as Knowledge in English for distribution in the United Kingdom:

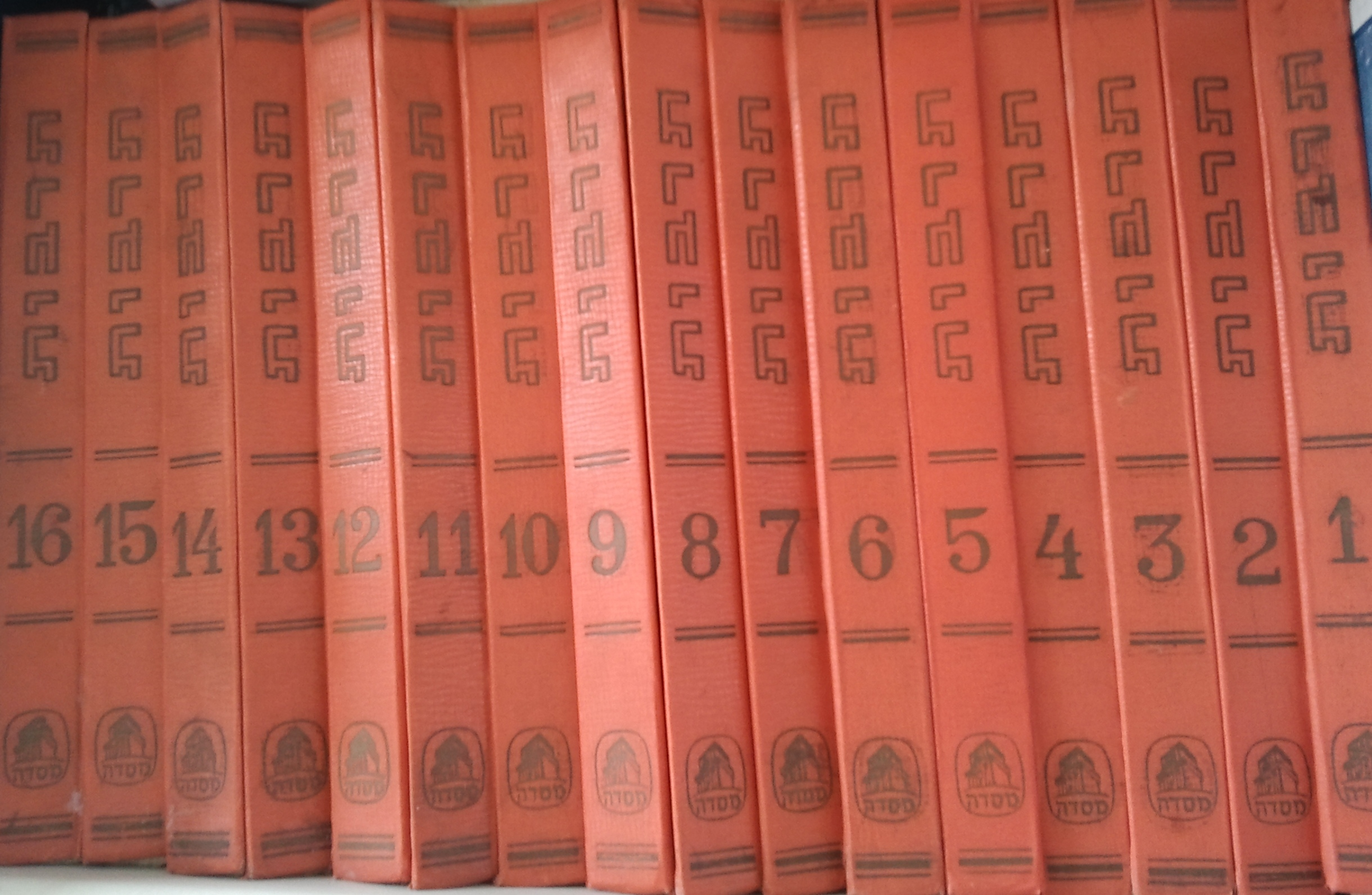
Bound collection of the Hebrew version

- Arab world: المعرفة Almaerifa ("Knowledge") – TRADEXIM S.A.
- Brazil: Conhecer ("To (Get to) Know)" – Abril Cultural, later Editora Nova Cultural (1966–1981)
- France: Tout l'Univers ("The Whole Universe") – Hachette (1961–present)
- Germany: Wissen ("Knowledge")
- Israel: אנציקלופדיה תרבות Entsiklopédya Tarbút ("Cultural Encyclopaedia") – Masada (1962–?)
- Italy: Conoscere ("Knowledge") – Fratelli Fabbri Editori, Milan (1958–1970)
- South Africa (Afrikaans): Kennis ("Knowledge") – KENNIS-Uitgewers (Cape Town and Pretoria), Human & Rousseau (1974–1980)
- Spain and Latin America: Enciclopedia Estudiantil ("Student Encyclopaedia")
- Turkey: Resimli bilgi ("Illustrated Information")
- United Kingdom: Knowledge – Purnell and Sons (1961–1966)
- United States: Golden Treasury of Knowledge

== Bibliography ==
- Picard, Vincent (7 June 2025). "Une "encyclopédie hebdomadaire" : Tout l'univers". Le Dicopathe (in French).
