= MP Lafer =

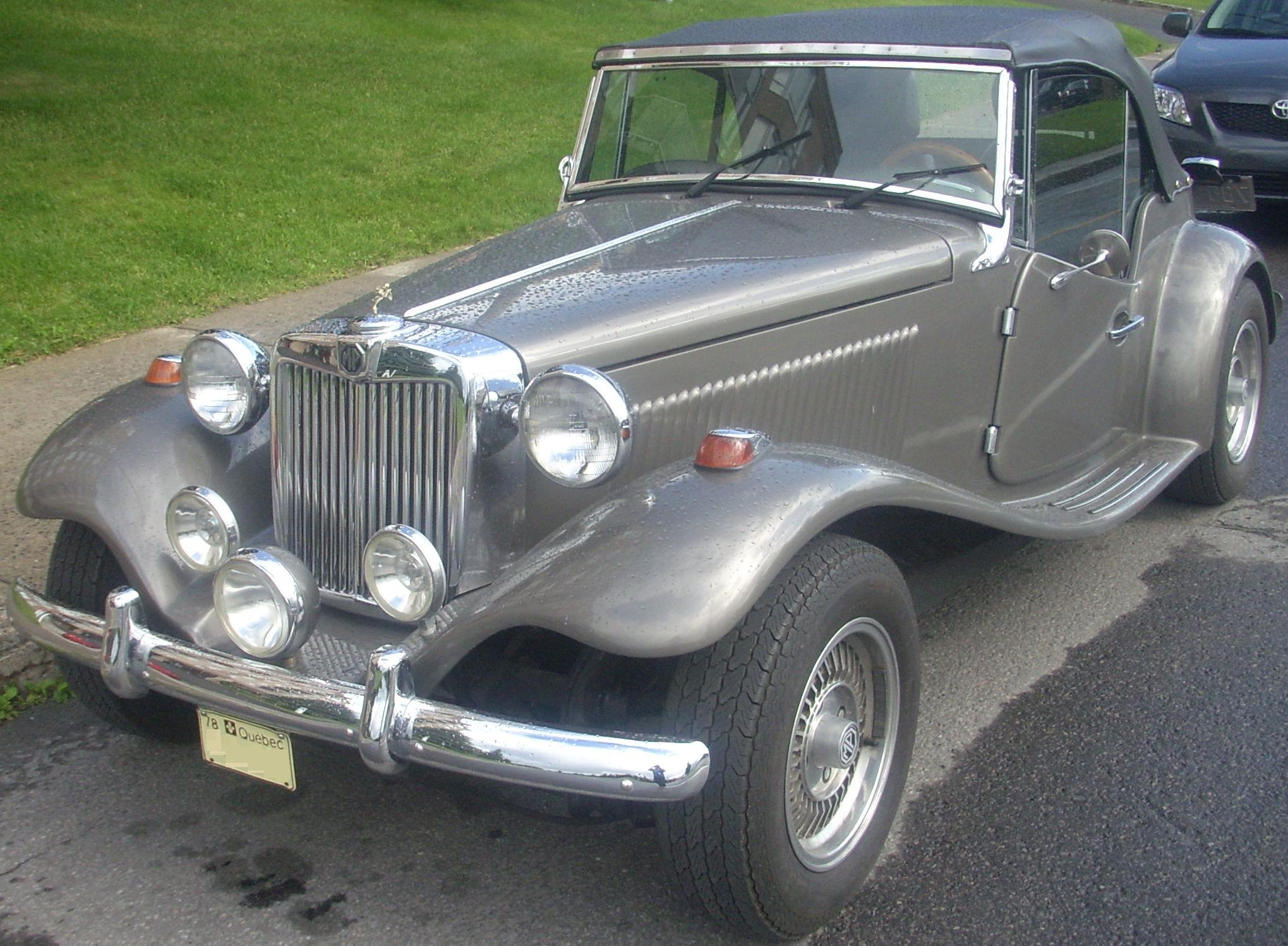

Overview
- Manufacturer: Lafer S/A
- Production: 1974–1990
- Assembly: Brazil: São Paulo

Body and chassis
- Body style: 2-door convertible
- Layout: RR layout

Powertrain
- Engine: 1.6 L H4
- Transmission: 4-speed manual

Dimensions
- Length: 3,910 mm (153.9 in)
- Width: 1,570 mm (61.8 in)
- Height: 1,350 mm (53.1 in)

The MP Lafer was an automobile built in Brazil by Lafer S/A. beginning in 1974. Created by Percival Lafer, a furniture manufacturer, it was a fiberglass-bodied two-seat roadster that took its styling cues from the classic British sports cars of the 1940s and early '50s, with a strong resemblance to the MG T-series and Morgan Plus 4. Unlike those, however, its chassis, engine, manual transmission, steering and suspension were from the Volkswagen Beetle (known as the Fusca in Brazil). Although the stock VW Type 1 four-cylinder made it somewhat underpowered, it became a sought-after car in its time. Approximately 4,300 were built over its 16-year production span. It was available in two models—the classic MP, and the more modern TI, introduced in March 1984. Some 1,000 were exported, most to Europe but some to the United States.

The project began when one of Lafer's employees, João Arnault, arrived at the factory driving a 1952 MG TD belonging to his wife Ivone. Captivated by the car, Lafer purchased it, disassembled it, and used it to create the molds for the fiberglass body. When the car was exhibited at the Brasil Export fair in Brussels in 1973, it received praise from MG representatives for the quality of its construction.

A white 1978 MP Lafer appeared in the James Bond film Moonraker (1979), driven along Copacabana beach in Rio de Janeiro by the character Manuela.

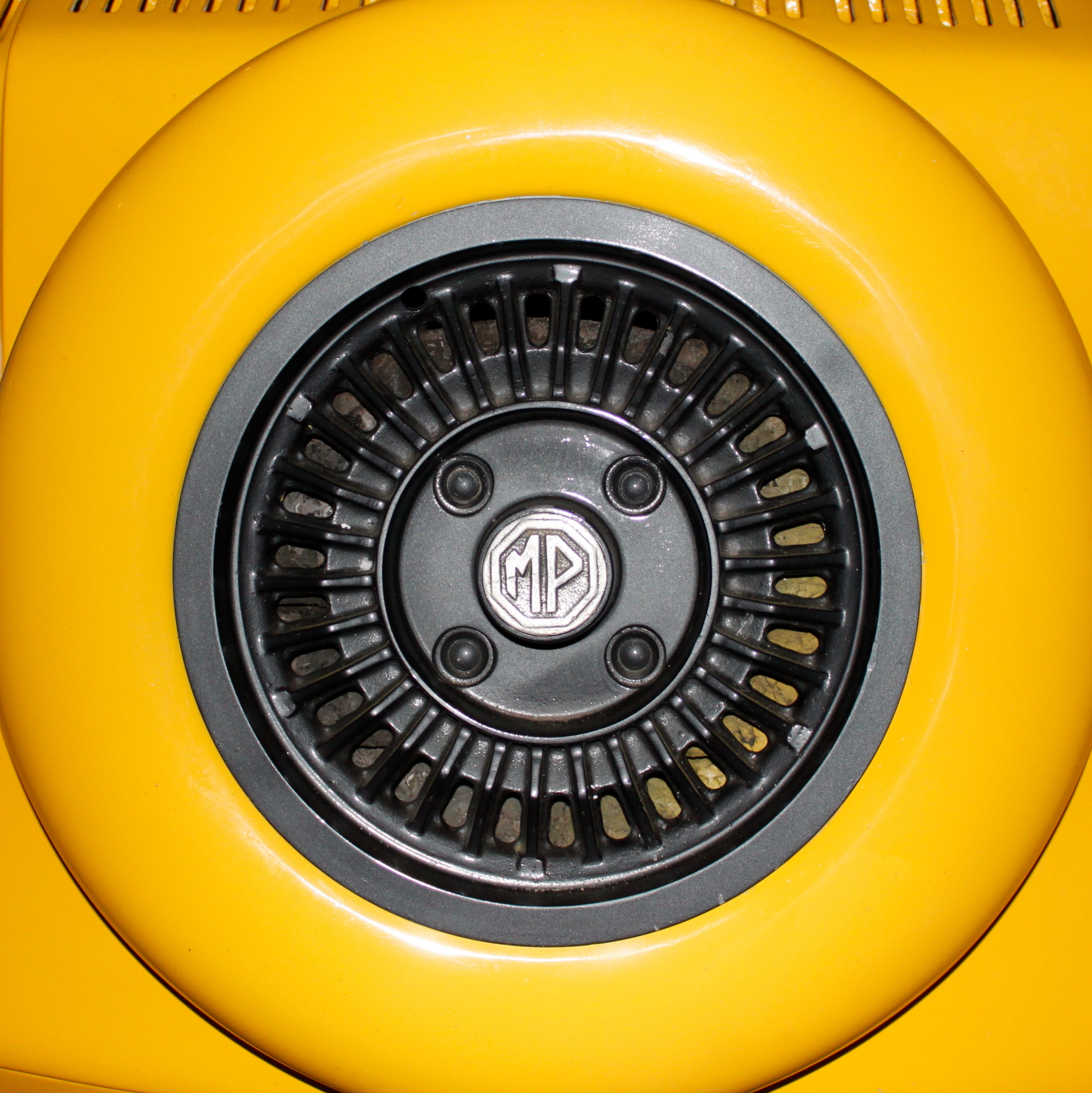
MP Lafer back
