= Marshall Cavendish =

Subsidiary company of Times Publishing Group

- Parent company: Times Publishing Group
- Founded: 1968; 58 years ago
- Founder: Norman Marshall and Patrick Cavendish
- Country of origin: Singapore
- Headquarters location: Singapore
- Official website: marshallcavendish.com

Marshall Cavendish is a subsidiary company of Times Publishing Group, the printing and publishing subsidiary of Singapore-based conglomerate Fraser and Neave (which in turn is owned by ThaiBev, a Thai beverage company), and publishes books, business directories and magazines.

== History ==
Marshall Cavendish was established in the United Kingdom in 1968 by Norman Marshall and Patrick Cavendish. Times Publishing Group acquired it in 1980.

In 2011, Amazon Publishing acquired over 450 titles of Marshall Cavendish's US Children's trade books business, Marshall Cavendish Children's Books (MCCB). In 2013, Roger Rosen of Rosen Publishing acquired the Marshall Cavendish's US Children's library books business.

== Books ==
- How It Works (later reprinted and updated by H. S. Stuttman Co., Inc.for the US, titled The Illustrated Science and Invention Encyclopedia)
- “Malaysian Murders & Mysteries” by Martin Vengadesan and Andrew Sagayam.

== Magazines, partworks ==
- Science Spy
- Young Generation (YG)
- Story of Life - published in 105 weekly parts - 1970 - 75 cents per magazine
- History of the Second World War - published in 96 weekly parts - 1973 - 95 cents a magazine
- Man and Woman - 1970 - 1976
- Insight - popular science magazine - published in weekly parts from 1980-1982
- Story Teller - very popular series of children’s stories with read along magazine narrated on to audio cassettes - first published - January 1983

• Story Teller 2 - sequel to the immensely popular first series -first published in 1984

- Discovery: Travel back in time and bring the past to life - (UK) Fortnightly history magazine for older children - first published October 1987

- Great Artists - 96 parts - first published 1985
- Great Composers and Their Music - 63 parts - first published 1985
- DIY Pro-File - first published 1986
- Times Past - 102 parts - published 1987
- Murder Casebook - published in 153 weekly parts - 1989
- Quest - (UK) 1989-1990s science partwork
- The Ancestral Trail - (UK) 1992-1994 Fortnightly fantasy/science fiction magazine for children
- Tree of Knowledge - (UK) 1994 encyclopedia part-work
- The Magical Music Box - (UK and other territories) 1994-1996 fortnightly magazine and CD/cassette featuring classical music
- Insight - (UK) 1979-81 - magazine of science and technology - 97 parts

== Directories ==
- Singapore Banking & Financial Services Directory
- Singapore Convention & Exhibition Directory
- Singapore Agri-Food Business Directory
- Directory of Certified Companies in Singapore
- Singapore Biotech Guide
- Singapore MedTech Directory
- Singapore Builders Directory
- Singapore Source Book for Architects, Designers & Building Contractors
- Directory of Singapore Process & Chemicals Industries
- Singapore Specialty Chemicals Guide
- Singapore Electronics Industry Directory
- Singapore Environmental Industry Directory
- Times Business Directory of Singapore
- Singapore Halal Industry Directory
- Singapore Airfreight Directory
- Singapore Maritime Directory
- Singapore Shiprepairing, Shipbuilding & Offshore Industries Directory
- Singapore Sports Guide
