= Maxwell Communication Corporation =

Media company in United Kingdom

Maxwell Communication Corporation plc
- Industry: Media
- Founded: 1964
- Defunct: 1991
- Fate: Administration
- Headquarters: London, United Kingdom
- Key people: Robert Maxwell (Chairman)

Maxwell Communication Corporation plc was a leading British media business. It was listed on the London Stock Exchange and was a constituent of the FTSE 100 Index. It collapsed in 1991 following the death of its titular owner, Robert Maxwell.

== History ==
=== Formation and turbulent years ===
The company was established in 1964 when Hazell Sun merged with Purnell & Sons (which also owned book publisher Macdonald) to form the British Printing Corporation. In 1967, the British Printing Corporation merged its magazines into Haymarket Group. During the 1970s the British Printing Corporation was involved in many disputes with trade unions. In 1978 such a dispute led to The Times and Sunday Times not being published for ten months.

=== Robert Maxwell's acquisition and company restructuring ===
In July 1981, Robert Maxwell launched a dawn raid on the company, acquiring a stake of 29%; the following year he secured full control of it. He changed the name of the company to British Printing & Communications Corporation in March 1982 and to Maxwell Communication Corporation in October 1987.

The company acquired Macmillan Inc., a large US publisher, in 1988. It went on to buy Science Research Associates (SRA) and the Official Airline Guide (OAG) later that year. SRA was sold to a joint venture of Maxwell's Macmillan and McGraw Hill the next year.

=== Administration and legal consequences ===
The company went into administration in 1991 following the death of Robert Maxwell. Its properties were sold to various media companies. Time Warner (then parent of Little, Brown and Company) acquired Macdonald. McGraw Hill acquired that part of Macmillan/McGraw Hill it did not already own outright. OAG was acquired by Reed Elsevier, while Macmillan was folded into Simon & Schuster.

In 1999, British courts determined that Coopers & Lybrand had made gross errors during their audits of the Maxwell group of companies and fined Coopers & Lybrand a record £3.3 million.
