= Partwork =

Written publication released as a series of issues

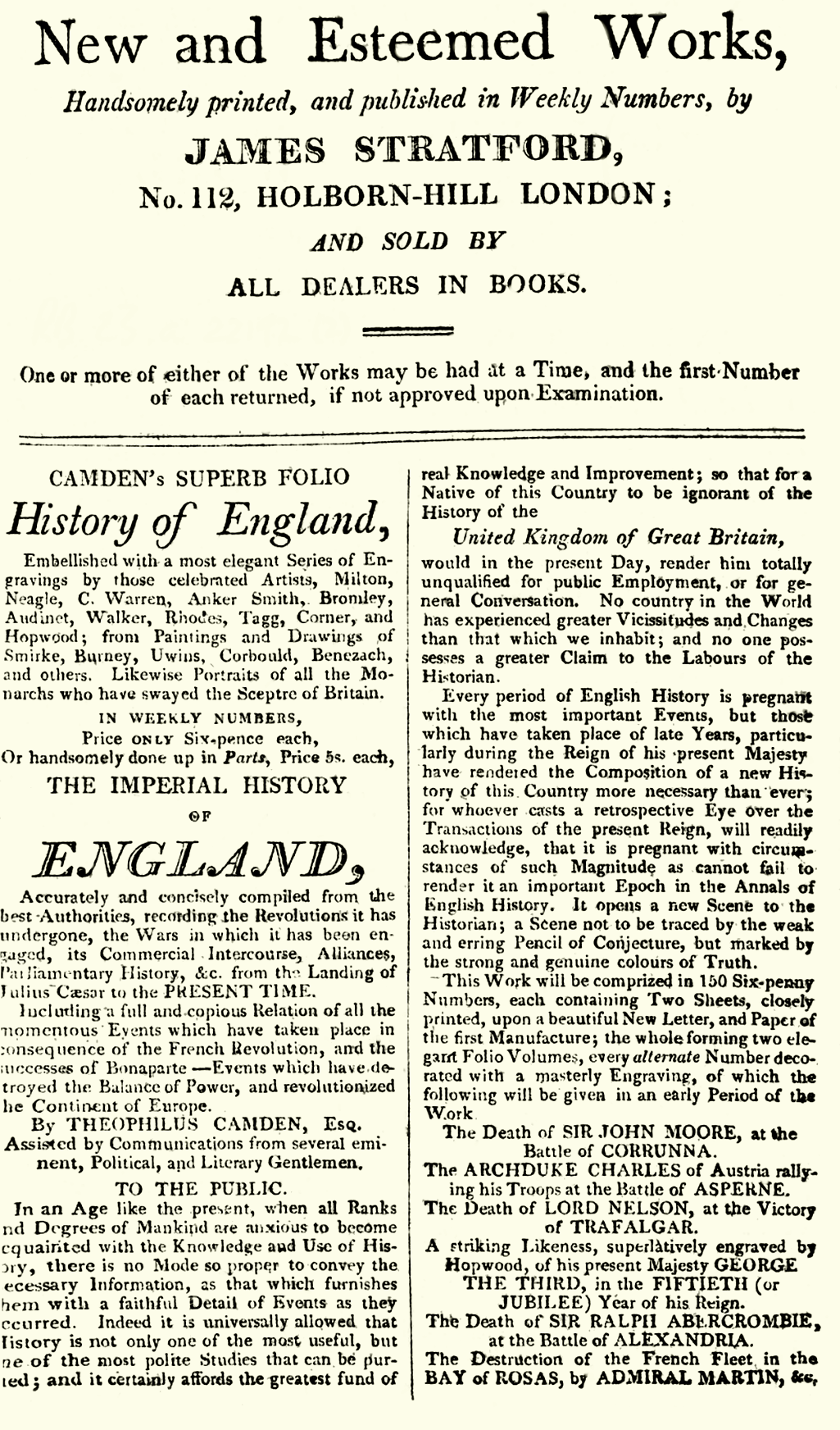
Advertising for part-works by James Stratford of London, 1810

A partwork is a written publication released as a series of planned magazine-like issues over a period of time. Issues are typically released on a weekly, fortnightly or monthly basis, and often a completed set is designed to form a reference work on a particular topic.

== Publication ==
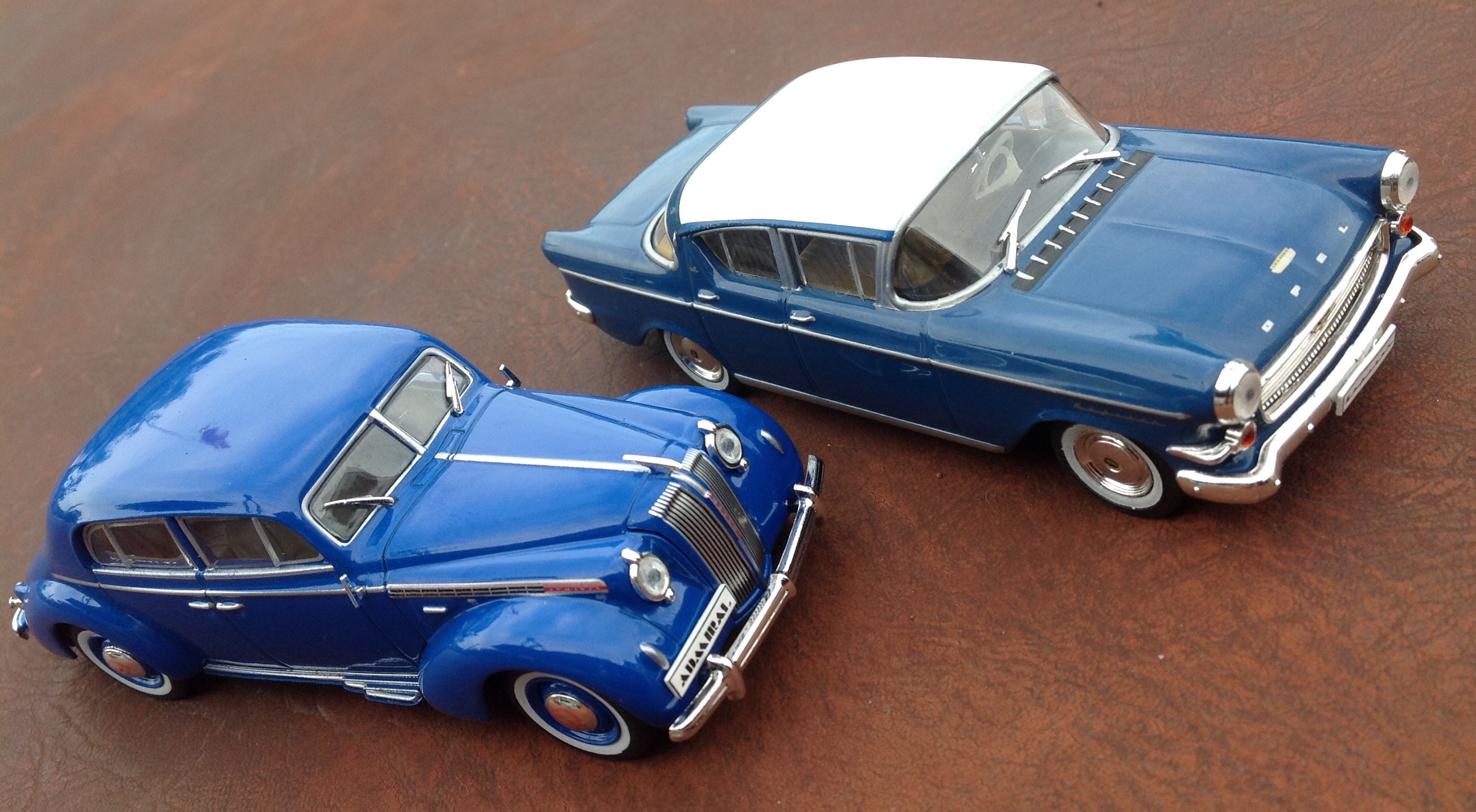
Models of an Opel Admiral and a 1958–59 Opel Kapitän cars in 1:43 scale by Altaya; issued as part of The Opal Collection partwork published by Eaglemoss

Partwork series run for a determined length and have a finite life. Generally, partworks cover specific areas of interest, such as sports, hobbies, or children's interest and stories such as PC Ace and the successful The Ancestral Trail series by Marshall Cavendish Ltd. They are generally sold at newsagents and are mostly supported by massive television advertising campaigns for the launch. In the United Kingdom, partworks were often launched by heavy television advertising each January.

Partworks often include cover-mounted items with each issue that build into a complete set over time. For example, a partwork about art might include a small number of paints or pencils that build into a complete art-set; a partwork about dinosaurs might include a few replica bones that build a complete model skeleton at the end of the series; a partwork about films may include a DVD with each issue. In Europe, partworks with collectable models are extremely popular; there are a number of different publications that come with character figurines or diecast model vehicles, for example: The James Bond Car Collection.

In addition, completed partworks have sometimes been used to create case-bound reference works and encyclopedias. An example is the multi-volume Illustrated Science and Invention Encyclopedia which was created with material first published in the How It Works partwork.

According to the Periodical Publishers Association in 2003, partworks were the fourth-best selling magazine sector in the UK, after TV listing guides, women's weeklies and women's monthlies. A common inducement is a heavy discount for the first one or two issues. The same series can be sold worldwide in different languages and even in different variations.

== History ==
Prior to the invention of printing, the Pecia System was used in European university cities. Books were divided into sections known as Pecia. Students or other individuals could rent the individual pieces and copy them by hand. In this way, several individuals could work on copying one book at the same time.

With the advent of printing, serialized publication came into use by printers and publishers. Between 1728 and 1732, Nicolas Tindal's English translation of Paul de Rapin's L'Histoire d'Angleterre (The History of England) was issued by a London printer in monthly parts. A rival printer then tried to compete by selling another translation of de Rapin's work in weekly, six-penny installments. An edition of Foxe's Book of Martyrs was issued in three-penny installments in 1732. At the time, printing a book was a lengthy process, copies of each section of the book being printed in turn until the work was complete; the sections would then be collated and the print-run of books could then be sold. The alternative of selling individual sections as soon as they were printed would enable the printer could gain a steady income while the book was being produced, and potentially increase sales by selling to people who could not afford the upfront cost of a copy of the complete book.

In the 19th century, many of Charles Dickens' novels were initially published as partworks. For example, The Pickwick Papers was first published in 19 parts, between 1836 and 1837. Likewise The Old Curiosity Shop was first published in 88 weekly parts between April 1840 and November 1841.

In the mid-20th century, partwork serialized encyclopedias were issued. Publishers soon branched out to other topics, including cookery books and series on gardening and car maintenance.

== Criticisms ==
Partworks, particularly those that contain parts for the production of a model or similar collectable items that are individually of little value, often draw criticism for the extremely high prices of their finished product. One example, released in the UK in 2009, required the purchase of 125 issues to collect the parts for a static, model aircraft; the total would be £620.25, many times higher than the cost of buying a standard model kit of the same aircraft outright. Examples of other models that cost over £400 to produce are cited, and some subscribers complain they have parts missing that they are unable to replace.

Conversely, the total cost of a partwork (often cited as in excess of £600) is used as a marketing tool by publishers and distributors seeking to encourage retailers to stock their items.

== Notable partwork publishers ==
- Amalgamated Press (no longer trading)
- De Agostini, who have approximately 50% of the worldwide market
- Del Prado (no longer trading)
- Eaglemoss Publications
- G E Fabbri
- Hachette
- International Masters Publishers
- IPC Magazines (no longer trading)
- Marshall Cavendish
- Midsummer Books (including Bright Star Publications)
- MODIMIO
- Orbis Publishing
- Purnell and Sons (no longer trading)
- RBA Coleccionables

== See also ==
- Book series
- Feuilleton
- Periodical literature
- Part-publication
- Part
- Serial (literature)
- Web serial
