= Die Another Day =

2002 James Bond film by Lee Tamahori

- British theatrical release poster
- Directed by: Lee Tamahori
- Written by: Neal Purvis Robert Wade
- Based on: James Bond by Ian Fleming
- Produced by: Michael G. Wilson; Barbara Broccoli
- Starring: Pierce Brosnan; Halle Berry; Toby Stephens; Rosamund Pike; Rick Yune; John Cleese; Judi Dench
- Cinematography: David Tattersall
- Edited by: Christian Wagner
- Music by: David Arnold
- Production companies: Metro-Goldwyn-Mayer; Eon Productions Limited
- Distributed by: MGM Distribution Co. (United States and Canada); 20th Century Fox (International)
- Release dates: 20 November 2002 (United Kingdom); 22 November 2002 (United States)
- Running time: 133 minutes
- Countries: United Kingdom; United States
- Language: English
- Budget: $142 million
- Box office: $432 million

Die Another Day is a 2002 spy film and the twentieth film in the James Bond series produced by Eon Productions. It was directed by Lee Tamahori, produced by Michael G. Wilson and Barbara Broccoli, and written by Neal Purvis and Robert Wade. The fourth and final film starring Pierce Brosnan as the fictional MI6 agent James Bond, it was also the last with Samantha Bond as Miss Moneypenny. Halle Berry co-stars as Bond girl and NSA agent Jinx. In the film, Bond attempts to locate a traitor in British intelligence who betrayed him and a British billionaire who is later revealed to be connected to a North Korean operative who Bond seemingly killed. It is an original story, although it takes influence from Bond creator Ian Fleming's novels Moonraker (1955) and The Man with the Golden Gun (1965), as well as Kingsley Amis's novel, Colonel Sun.

Die Another Day was released on 20 November 2002 internationally by 20th Century Fox and in the United States two days later by MGM Distribution Co. under the Metro-Goldwyn-Mayer label. The film also marked the James Bond franchise's 40th anniversary, and includes references to each of the preceding films. It received mixed reviews from critics, who praised Tamahori's direction, but criticised the reliance on CGI, product placement, plot and villain. Nevertheless, the film was a box-office success, grossing $432 million worldwide, becoming the sixth-highest-grossing film of 2002.

The next film in the series, Casino Royale, was released in November 2006, which also served as a reboot of the franchise with Daniel Craig replacing Brosnan as Bond.

== Plot ==
MI6 agent James Bond infiltrates a North Korean military base where Colonel Tan-Sun Moon is trading weapons for Sierra Leonean conflict diamonds. After Moon's right-hand man, Zao, receives notification of Bond's real identity, a hovercraft chase ensues and ends with Moon's craft tumbling over a waterfall. Bond is captured by North Korean soldiers and imprisoned by the Colonel's father, General Moon. After 14 months of captivity and torture at the hands of the Korean People's Army (KPA), Bond is traded for Zao in a prisoner exchange across the Bridge of No Return. He is taken to meet M, who informs him that his status as a 00 Agent has been suspended on suspicion that he leaked information to the North Koreans under duress. Bond is convinced that he has been set up by a double agent in the British government. After escaping MI6 custody, he finds himself in Hong Kong, where he learns from Chang, a Chinese agent and old colleague, that Zao is in Cuba.

In Havana, Bond meets NSA agent Giacinta "Jinx" Johnson and follows her to a gene therapy clinic, where patients can have their appearances altered through DNA restructuring. Jinx kills Dr. Alvarez, the clinic's leader, while Bond locates Zao inside the clinic and fights him. Zao escapes, leaving behind a pendant containing a cache of conflict diamonds bearing the emblem of young British billionaire Gustav Graves. Bond learns that Graves appeared only a year prior, apparently having discovered a diamond vein in Iceland that led to his sudden wealth and fame. At Blades Club in London, Bond meets Graves along with his assistant Miranda Frost, who is also an undercover MI6 agent. After a fencing match that escalates into a claymore duel, Graves invites Bond to Iceland for a scientific demonstration. M restores Bond's Double-0 status, but warns him that MI6 has other priorities and Q issues him an Aston Martin V12 Vanquish with active camouflage.

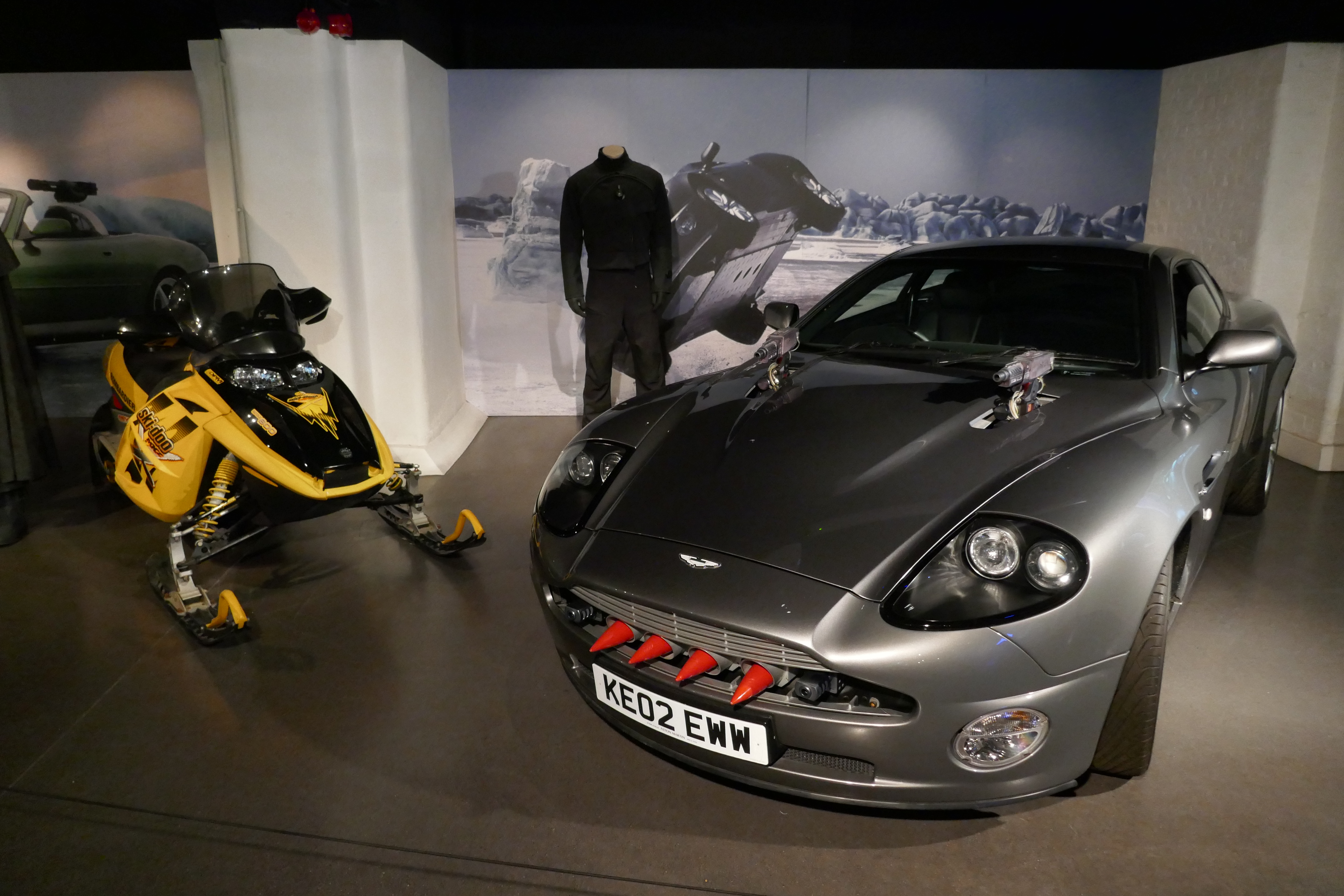
Aston Martin V12 Vanquish and Bombardier Ski-doo MX-Z Rev used in the film

At his ice palace in Iceland, Graves unveils a new orbital mirror satellite, Icarus, which is able to focus solar energy on a small area and provide year-round sunshine for agriculture. Frost seduces Bond, and Jinx infiltrates Graves's command centre but is captured by Graves and Zao. Bond rescues her and discovers that Graves is Colonel Moon, who has used gene therapy to change his appearance and is using his new persona as a front for his conflict diamonds operation.

Bond confronts Graves, but Frost arrives to reveal herself as the traitor who betrayed him in North Korea, forcing Bond to escape from Graves's facility. Graves uses Icarus to cause a tidal wave to kill Bond, but he escapes on a makeshift surfboard. He returns in his Vanquish to rescue Jinx, who has been recaptured in the ice palace. Graves uses Icarus to melt the palace to drown Jinx, while Zao pursues Bond inside using his Jaguar XKR. Bond kills Zao by causing an ice chandelier to fall onto him, and revives a nearly drowned Jinx in a hot pool.

Bond and Jinx pursue Graves and Frost to the Korean Peninsula and stow away on Graves's An-124 cargo plane. Graves, now wearing a “defensive suit” capable of giving high voltage shocks, reveals his identity to his father, and the true purpose of the Icarus satellite: to cut a path through the Korean Demilitarised Zone with concentrated sunlight, allowing North Korea to invade South Korea and unify the peninsula. Realizing this could provoke a nuclear attack by the U.S. and U.N., General Moon protests, before Graves kills him.

Bond and Graves fight and a gunshot pierces the fuselage, causing the plane to decompress and descend rapidly. Jinx attempts to regain control of the plane, but is attacked by Frost, leading to a sword duel in which Frost is killed. After the plane passes through the Icarus beam and is further damaged, Bond opens Graves's parachute and uses the electrified suit against him, pulling him out of the plane and into one of its engines. This disables Icarus, and Bond and Jinx escape the plane in a helicopter from the cargo hold with the diamonds. Later, they spend a romantic evening at a remote Buddhist temple hut.

== Cast ==
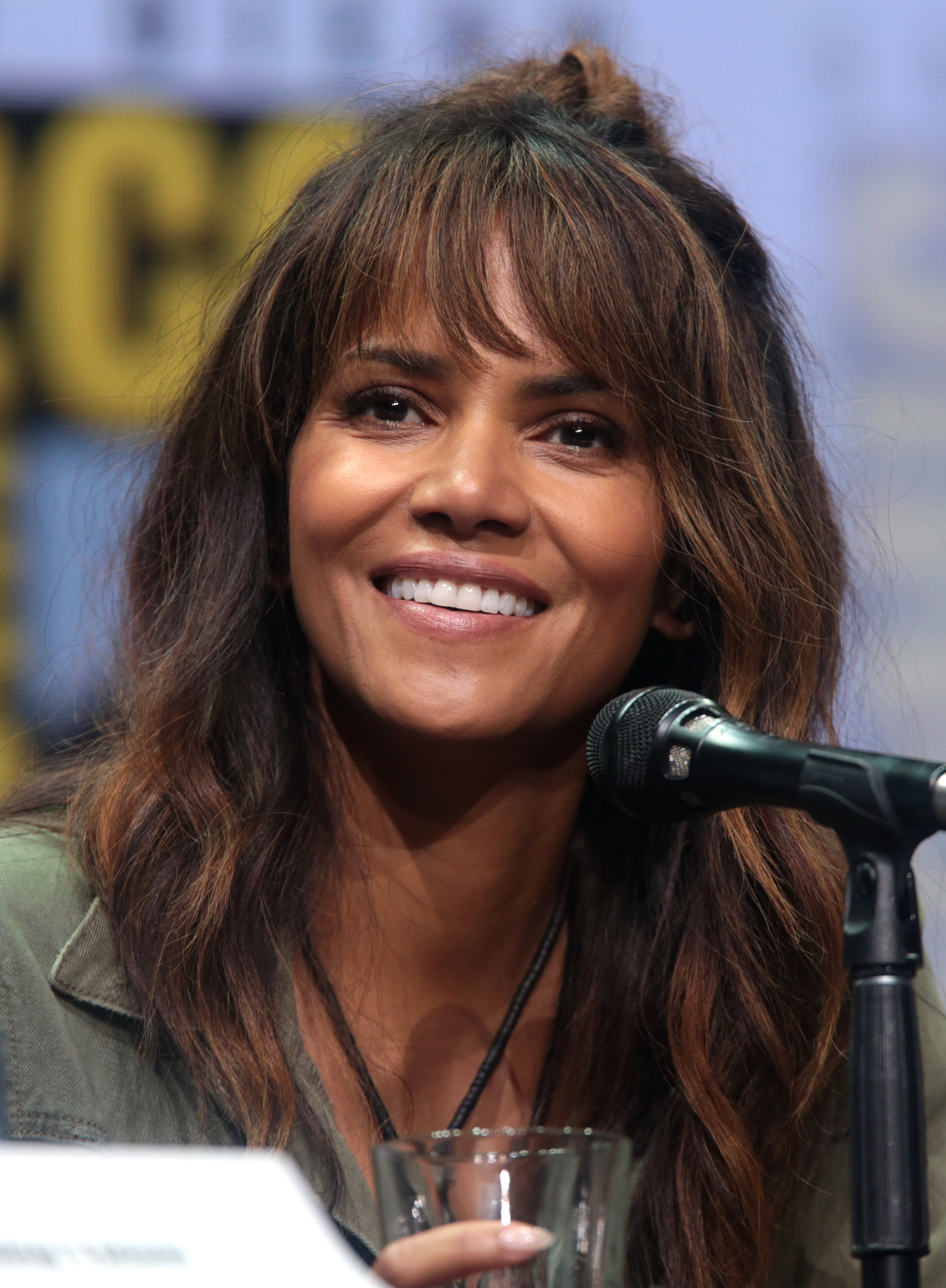
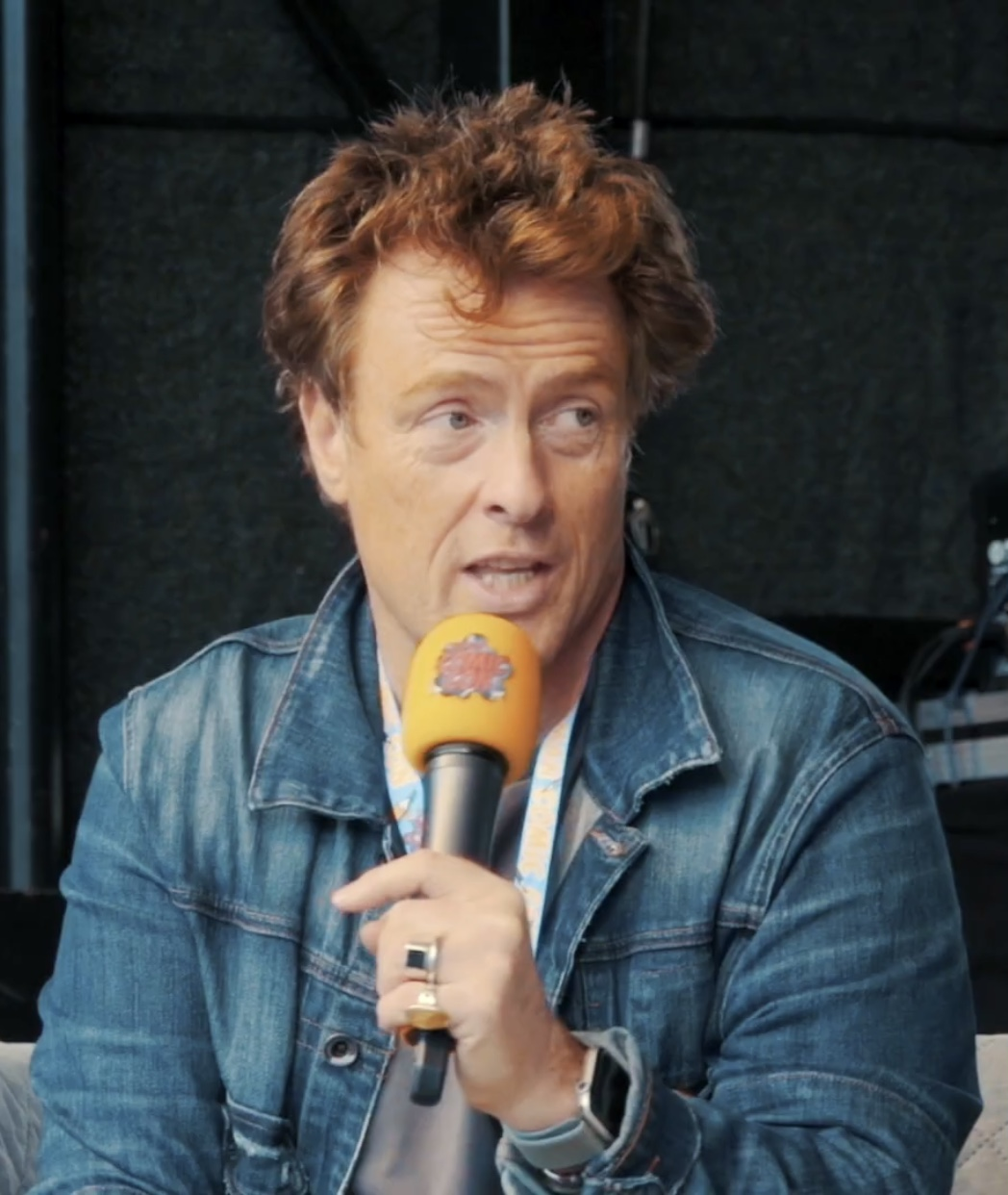
Pierce Brosnan (left), Halle Berry (both in 2017) and Toby Stephens (in 2021)
- Pierce Brosnan as James Bond, MI6 agent 007.
- Halle Berry as Giacinta "Jinx" Johnson, an NSA agent Before Berry's casting Salma Hayek, Saffron Burrows and Sophie Ellis-Bextor were also considered for the role.
- Toby Stephens as Gustav Graves, a British entrepreneur and the alter ego of Colonel Tan-Sun Moon. Graves was modelled after Hugo Drax in Ian Fleming's original Moonraker. He was also modelled after Uday Hussein and Richard Branson.
- Will Yun Lee as Colonel Tan-Sun Moon, a rogue North Korean army colonel and the original persona of Graves
- Rosamund Pike as Miranda Frost, undercover MI6 agent and double agent
- Rick Yune as Tang-Ling Zao, a North Korean terrorist working for Moon and living as an exile
- Judi Dench as M, the head of MI6
- John Cleese as Q, MI6's quartermaster and armourer
- Michael Madsen as Damian Falco, Jinx's superior in the NSA
- Samantha Bond as Miss Moneypenny, M's secretary
- Colin Salmon as Charles Robinson, M's Deputy Chief of Staff
- Kenneth Tsang as General Moon, Colonel Moon's father
- Michael Gorevoy as Vladimir Popov, Gustav Graves's personal scientist
- Lawrence Makoare as Mr. Kil, one of Gustav Graves's henchmen
- Ho Yi as Mr. Chang, a Chinese special agent, undercover as a hotel manager. In early drafts of the script, it was Wai Lin (Michelle Yeoh) who aided Bond in Hong Kong, but the idea fell through due to scheduling conflicts with Yeoh producing another film and Chang was created to replace her.
- Rachel Grant as Peaceful Fountains of Desire, a Chinese agent working for Mr. Chang, undercover as a masseuse
- Emilio Echevarría as Raoul, the manager of a Havana cigar factory, and a British sleeper agent

Other actors in the film include Simón Andreu as Dr. Álvarez, the director of the Cuban gene therapy facility; Vincent Wong as General Li, one of Graves/Moon's co-conspirators; Joaquin Martinez as the elderly cigar factory worker, Mark Dymond as Van Bierk, a diamond smuggler whose identity Bond steals at the beginning of the film; and Oliver Skeete as the concierge at the fencing club.

Cameo appearances in the film include Madonna as Verity, Graves's and Frost's fencing instructor; producer Michael G. Wilson as General Chandler, the senior commander of American forces in South Korea; and Deborah Moore (the daughter of former Bond actor Roger Moore) as a British Airways hostess.

== Production ==
Producers Barbara Broccoli and Michael G. Wilson asked Michael Apted, who directed The World Is Not Enough, to return for the next instalment. Although he accepted, they rescinded the offer after incoming MGM executive Chris McGurk told Broccoli and Wilson that he wanted more action and spectacle than romance and intrigue. Tony Scott and John Woo were approached, but they both declined. Scott claims to have suggested Quentin Tarantino as director, although Wilson denies any formal negotiations were held with him. Pierce Brosnan suggested John McTiernan, Ang Lee and Martin Scorsese as potential choices, and informally discussed the idea of directing a Bond film with Scorsese on a flight. Brett Ratner, Stephen Hopkins and Stuart Baird were later in negotiations to direct, before Lee Tamahori was hired. When asked why he accepted the job, Tamahori joked: "I thought of Bond as the great last gasp of British filmmaking and it's the duty of a good ex-colonial to come and take the job of a local British director!"

Tamahori confirmed to Total Film that he had pitched a scene where Brosnan's 007 meets an older, former 007 in Scotland played by Sean Connery, but was advised it was "too dangerous" to have two 007s in one movie.

=== Filming ===
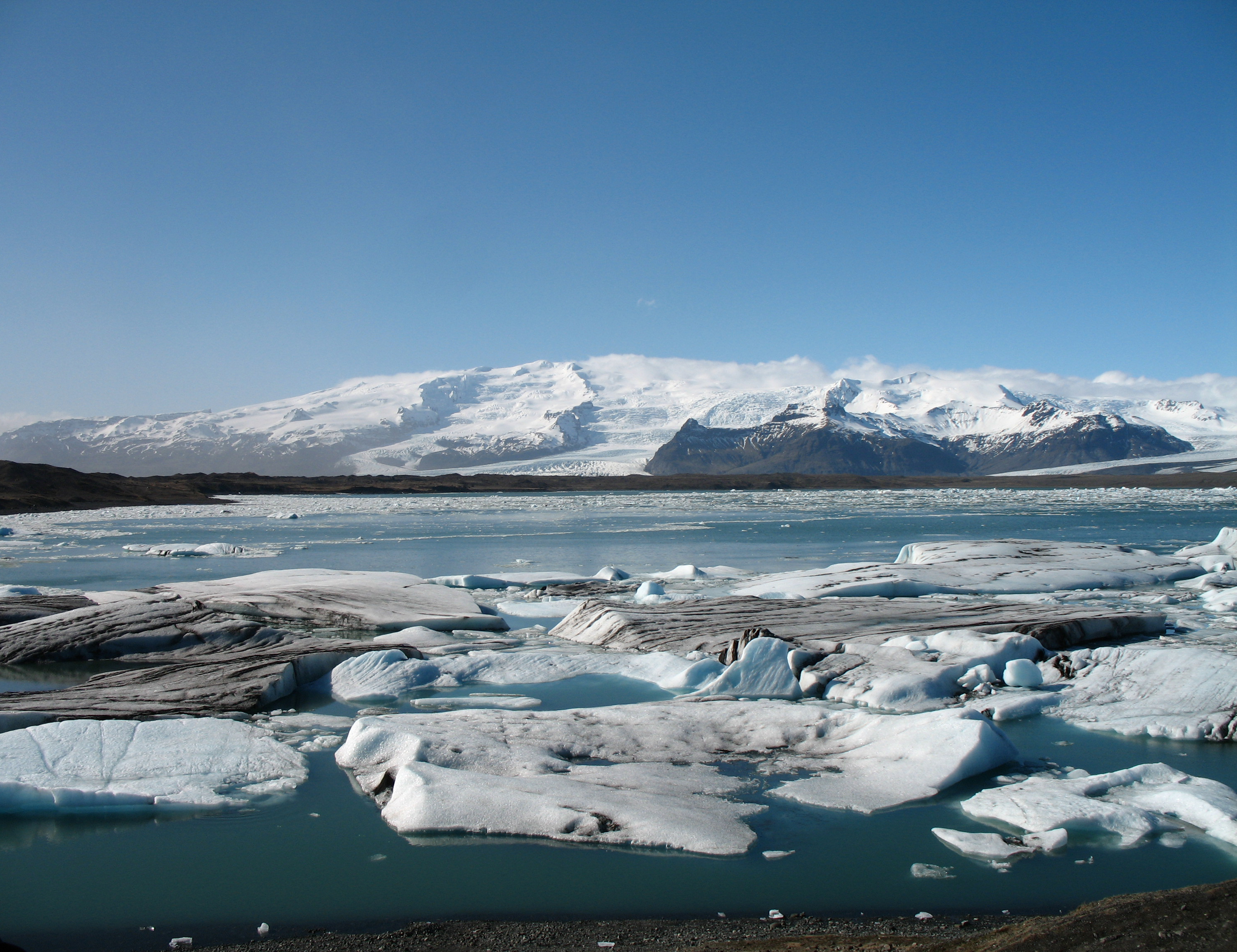
Jökulsárlón, Iceland

Principal photography of Die Another Day began on 11 January 2002 at Pinewood Studios. The film was shot primarily in the United Kingdom, Iceland and Cádiz, Spain. Other locations included Pinewood Studios' 007 Stage and Maui, Hawaii, in December 2001. Laird Hamilton, Dave Kalama and Darrick Doerner performed the pre-title surfing scene at the surf break known as "Jaws" in Peʻahi, Maui, while the shore shots were taken near Cádiz and Newquay, Cornwall. Scenes inside Graves's diamond mine were also filmed in Cornwall, at the Eden Project. The scenes involving the Cuban locations of Havana and the fictional Isla de Los Organos were filmed at La Caleta, Spain.

The scenes featuring Berry in a bikini (designed to resemble Ursula Andress's swimming costume in Dr. No) were shot in Cádiz. The location was cold and windy, and footage has been released of Berry wrapped in thick towels between takes to avoid catching a chill. Berry was injured during filming when debris from a smoke grenade flew into her eye. The debris was removed in a 30-minute operation. Brosnan also sustained a knee injury during the shooting of an action scene in Cornwall.

Surfers

The film includes references to each of the preceding films. Gadgets and other props from every previous Bond film and stored in Eon Productions' archives appear in Q's warehouse in the London Underground. Examples include the jetpack in Thunderball and Rosa Klebb's poison-tipped shoe in From Russia with Love. Q mentions that the watch he issues Bond is "your 20th, I believe", a reference to Die Another Day being the 20th Eon-produced Bond film. In London, the Reform Club was used to shoot several places in the film, including the lobby and gallery at the Blades Club, MI6 Headquarters, Buckingham Palace, Green Park and Westminster. Jökulsárlón, Iceland was used for the car chase on the ice. Four Aston Martins and four Jaguars, all converted to four-wheel drive, were used (and wrecked) filming the sequence. A temporary dam was constructed at the mouth of the narrow inlet to keep the salty ocean water out and allow the lagoon to freeze. Additional chase footage was filmed at Svalbard, Norway, Jostedalsbreen National Park, Norway, and RAF Little Rissington, Gloucestershire. Manston Airport in Kent was used for the scenes involving the Antonov cargo plane scenes. The scene in which Bond surfs the wave created by Icarus when Graves was attempting to kill Bond was shot on the blue screen. The waves, along with all the glaciers in the scene, are computer-generated.

The hangar interior of the US Air Base in South Korea, shown crowded with Chinook helicopters, was filmed at RAF Odiham in Hampshire, UK, as were the helicopter interior shots during the Switchblade sequence. These latter scenes, though portrayed in the air, were actually filmed entirely on the ground with the sky background being added in post-production using blue screen techniques. Although the base is portrayed in the film as a US base, all the aircraft and personnel in the scene are British in real life. In the film, Switchblades (one-person gliders resembling fighter jets in shape) are flown by Bond and Jinx to stealthily enter North Korea. The Switchblade was based on a workable model called "PHASST" (Programmable High Altitude Single Soldier Transport). Kinetic Aerospace Inc.'s lead designer, Jack McCornack was impressed by director Lee Tamahori's way of conducting the Switchblade scene and commented: "It's brief, but realistic. The good guys get in unobserved, thanks to a fast cruise, good glide performance, and minimal radar signature. It's a wonderful promotion for the PHASST."

The satellite attack at the end of the film was at first written to take place in Manhattan, but after the September 11 attacks, it was moved to the Korean Demilitarized Zone.

=== Music ===
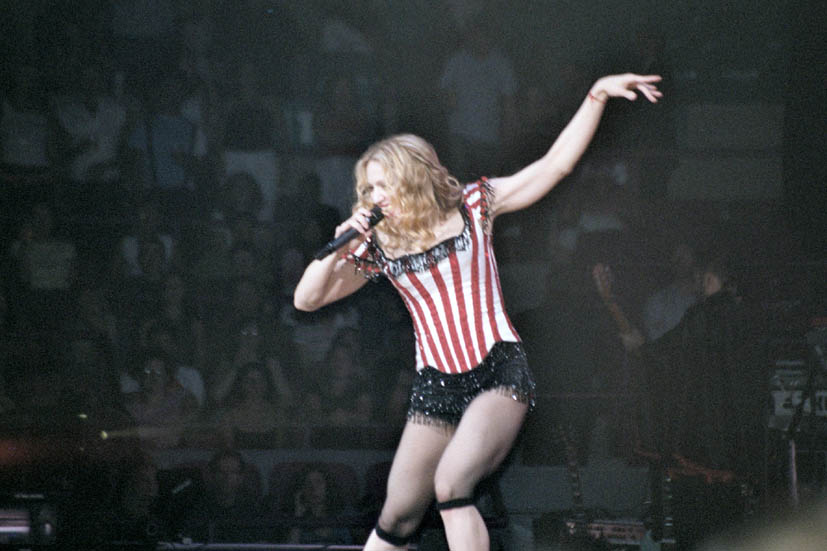
Madonna performing the eponymous theme song in 2004

The soundtrack was composed by David Arnold and released on Warner Bros. Records. He again made use of electronic rhythm elements in his score, and included two of the new themes created for The World Is Not Enough. The first, originally used as Renard's theme, is heard during the mammoth "Antonov" cue on the recording, and is written for piano. The second new theme, used in the "Christmas in Turkey" track of The World Is Not Enough, is reused in the "Going Down Together" track.

The title song for Die Another Day was co-written and co-produced by Mirwais Ahmadzai and performed by Madonna, who also had a cameo in the film as Verity, a fencing instructor. The concept of the title sequence is to represent Bond trying to survive 14 months of torture at the hands of the North Koreans. Critics' opinions of the song were sharply divided; it was nominated for a Golden Globe for Best Original Song and the 2004 Grammy Award for Best Dance Recording, but also for a Golden Raspberry Award for Worst Original Song of 2002 (while Madonna herself won the Golden Raspberry Award for Worst Supporting Actress for her cameo). In a MORI poll for the Channel 4 programme "James Bond's Greatest Hits", the song was voted 9th out of 22, and also came in as an "overwhelming number one" favourite among those under the age of 24.

== Marketing ==
Reportedly, twenty companies paying $70 million had their products featured in the film, a record at the time, although USA Today reported that number to be as high as $100 million.

The eleventh-generation Ford Thunderbird was featured in the film as Jinx's car, with a coral colour paying homage to a paint option for the original model, and matching her bikini. Ford produced a limited-edition 007-branded 2003 Thunderbird as a tie-in for the film, featuring a similar paint job.

Revlon produced "007 Colour Collection" makeup inspired by Jinx. Bond Barbie dolls inspired by the franchise were also produced, featuring a red shawl and an evening dress designed by Lindy Hemming, and sold in a gift set with Ken posing as Bond in formal wear designed by the Italian fashion house Brioni.

== Release ==
Die Another Day had its world premiere on 18 November 2002 at the 56th Royal Film Performance, a fundraising event held in aid of The Film and TV Charity. The event took place at the Royal Albert Hall in London and Queen Elizabeth II and Prince Philip were guests of honour. The Royal Albert Hall had a makeover for the screening and had been transformed into an ice palace. Proceeds from the premiere, about £500,000, were donated to The Film and Television Charity, of which the Queen was patron.

Die Another Day was controversial in the Korean Peninsula. The North Korean government disliked the portrayal of their state as brutal and war-hungry. There were boycotts in South Korea outside the 145 theatres where it was released on 31 December 2002, as they were offended by the scene in which an American officer issues orders to the South Korean army in the defence of their homeland, and by a sex scene near a statue of the Buddha. The Jogye Buddhist Order issued a statement that the film was "disrespectful to our religion and does not reflect our values and ethics". The Washington Post reported growing resentment in the nation towards the United States. An official of the South Korean Ministry of Culture and Tourism said that Die Another Day was "the wrong film at the wrong time."

=== Home media ===
Die Another Day was released on DVD and VHS on 3 June 2003 by MGM Home Entertainment. It was released on Blu-ray on 21 October 2008. It was released digital in 4K on 15 September 2015.

== Reception ==
=== Box office ===
On the first day of release, ticket sales reached £1.2 million at the UK box office. Die Another Day grossed $47 million on its opening weekend in the US and Canada and was ranked number one at the box office. The film competed against Harry Potter and the Chamber of Secrets and The Santa Clause 2 during the Thanksgiving weekend. Later on, Harry Potter and the Chamber of Secrets and Die Another Day would simultaneously reclaim the number one spot at the box office. For six months, they were both the latest films to return to the top spot at the box office, until Finding Nemo joined the group in June 2003. The film earned $160.9 million in the US and Canada, and $432 million worldwide, becoming the sixth-highest-grossing film of 2002. Not adjusting for inflation, Die Another Day was the highest-grossing James Bond film until the release of the next James Bond movie, Casino Royale, in 2006.

=== Critical response ===
On Rotten Tomatoes, the film received an approval rating of 55% based on 226 reviews, with an average rating of 6.1/10. The site's critical consensus reads: "Its action may be a bit too over-the-top for some, but Die Another Day is lavishly crafted and succeeds in evoking classic Bond themes from the franchise's earlier installments." On Metacritic, the film has a weighted average score of 56 out of 100 based on 43 critics, indicating "mixed and average reviews". Audiences surveyed by CinemaScore gave the film a grade "A−" on scale of A to F.

Michael Dequina of Film Threat praised the film as the best of the series to star Pierce Brosnan and "the most satisfying installment of the franchise in recent memory." Larry Carroll of CountingDown.com praised Lee Tamahori for having "magnificently balanced the film so that it keeps true to the Bond legend, makes reference to the classic films that preceded it, but also injects a new zest to it all." Entertainment Weekly magazine also gave a positive reaction, saying that Tamahori, "a true filmmaker", has re-established the series' pop sensuality. A. O. Scott of The New York Times called the film the best of the James Bond series since The Spy Who Loved Me. Roger Ebert of the Chicago Sun-Times, who gave the film three stars out of four, stated: "This movie has the usual impossible stunts ... But it has just as many scenes that are lean and tough enough to fit in any modern action movie". Kyle Bell of Movie Freaks 365 stated in his review that the "first half of Die Another Day is classic Bond", but that "things start to go downhill when the ice palace gets introduced."

Several reviewers felt the film relied too heavily on gadgets and special effects, with the plot being neglected. James Berardinelli of ReelViews said: "This is a train wreck of an action film—a stupefying attempt by the filmmakers to force-feed James Bond into the mindless XXX mold and throw 40 years of cinematic history down the toilet in favor of bright flashes and loud bangs." Of the action sequences, he said: "Die Another Day is an exercise in loud explosions and excruciatingly bad special effects. The CGI work in this movie is an order of magnitude worse than anything I have seen in a major motion picture. Coupled with lousy production design, Die Another Day looks like it was done on the cheap." Keith Phipps of The A.V. Club stated that "the many shots of characters operating devices with remote controls will do little to quiet the complaints that the films have started to resemble video games, and the same can be said of the proliferating digital effects." Gary Brown of the Houston Community Newspapers also described the weak point of the film as "the seemingly non-stop action sequences and loud explosions that appear to take centre stage while the Bond character is almost relegated to second string." Todd McCarthy of Variety described it as "a midrange series entry that sports some tasty scenes, mostly in the first half, but also pushes 007 into CGI-driven, quasi-sci-fi territory that feels like a betrayal of what the franchise has always been about." Roger Moore, who played Bond in earlier films, said: "I thought it just went too far—and that's from me, the first Bond in space! Invisible cars and dodgy CGI footage? Please!"

The amount of product placement in Die Another Day had been a contemporaneous point of criticism, with the BBC, Time and Reuters referring mockingly to the film using the title "Buy Another Day". The producers subsequently chose to limit the number of companies involved in product placement to eight for the next Bond film, Casino Royale, in 2006.

=== Retrospective ===
Despite favour from fans who prefer Bond's more "camp" films, a comment piece in 2020 stated that it is "considered by many to be the worst entry in James Bond's canon" and compares unfavourably to The Bourne Identity (released months earlier), which "ushered in a new era of violent, gritty action-espionage movies" and gave rise to the "stripped-down, no-nonsense" Bond of Daniel Craig. It often occupies a low rank on Bond-related lists, and the title song has also received mixed reactions. In a 2021 Yahoo! survey consisting of 2,200 experts and superfans, Die Another Day was ranked as the third-worst instalment after Quantum of Solace and Spectre. The authors of the study did, however, specify that "every Bond film...is always someone's favourite".

== Media ==
Die Another Day was novelised by the then-official James Bond writer, Raymond Benson, based on the screenplay by Neal Purvis and Robert Wade. An effort is made to depict some of the film's more outlandish elements with more believability, in the style of Fleming's original novels' use of cutting-edge technology. So, for example, the non-bodywork elements of the Aston Martin with its 'cloaking' function (the glass windows and rubber tyres) are described as having retractable covers to achieve the invisibility effect. Fan reaction to it was above average.

007 Legends, released in 2012, features Daniel Craig's James Bond in a Die Another Day level.

== Cancelled spin-off ==
Speculation arose in 2003 of a spin-off film concentrating on Jinx, which was scheduled for a November/December 2004 release. It was originally reported that MGM was keen to set up a film series that would be a "Winter Olympics" alternative to the main series. In the late 1990s, MGM had originally considered developing a spin-off film based on Michelle Yeoh's character, Wai Lin, in 1997's Tomorrow Never Dies. The spin-off Jinx was announced in December 2002. Lee Tamahori initially wanted to direct, but Stephen Frears was ultimately hired. Berry and Michael Madsen were originally going to reprise their roles as Jinx and Falco, while Jinx's lover was going to be played by Javier Bardem, who would later play villain Raoul Silva in Skyfall (2012). The film would have revolved around Jinx's entry into the NSA, revealing that she had been adopted by Falco after being orphaned in a bombing and being hired by him from the RAND Corporation to do a job at the NSA as a favour. Wade described the film as "a very atmospheric, Euro thriller, a Bourne-type movie."

However, despite much speculation of an imminent movie, on 26 October 2003, Variety reported that MGM had cancelled the project. MGM instead decided to reboot the James Bond franchise with the next film, Casino Royale, with Daniel Craig portraying the role of the titular character. In 2020, Berry revealed that the film was cancelled over its $80 million budget, saying: "Nobody was ready to sink that kind of money into a black female action star." Purvis and Wade said that this decision was influenced by the failure of several action films with female stars, including Charlie's Angels: Full Throttle and Lara Croft: Tomb Raider – The Cradle of Life, in 2003. Chris McTurk told The Daily Telegraph in 2022 that the decision to cancel the film was his: "I killed that. There had been other attempts to get a female-driven action effects movie off the ground that failed. My point was, it's a good idea in theory but if it fails, you're going to damage the whole franchise."

== See also ==
- Invisibility in fiction
- Outline of James Bond
