= Jinx (James Bond) =

Giacinta "Jinx" Johnson
- James Bond character
- Halle Berry as Jinx
- First appearance: Die Another Day
- Last appearance: 007 Legends
- Portrayed by: Halle Berry (Die Another Day); Gabriela Montaraz (007 Legends ‒ Likeness)
- Voiced by: Madalena Alberto (007 Legends)

In-universe information
- Gender: Female
- Affiliation: NSA
- Classification: Bond girl

Giacinta "Jinx" Johnson is a fictional character in the James Bond franchise, first appearing in the 2002 film Die Another Day, portrayed by Halle Berry.

== Appearances ==
Giacinta "Jinx" Johnson is a National Security Agency agent assigned to kill rogue North Korean agent Zao (Rick Yune), who is undergoing gene-replacement therapy at the Alvarez clinic in Cuba. The night before confronting Zao, she meets and has sex with James Bond (Pierce Brosnan), who is also after Zao, in the hope of extracting the identity of a double agent responsible for his being imprisoned and tortured in North Korea. She tells Bond that her nickname is derived from her being born on Friday the 13th.

The two cross paths again at the clinic while chasing Zao; when Jinx's mission is interrupted by Bond and Zao escapes by helicopter, she strips to her bikini and dives backwards off the edge of the wall into the ocean, where she is picked up by a fellow agent on a boat. Jinx tracks Zao to Gustav Graves (Toby Stephens)' diamond mine in Iceland, where Graves demonstrates the potential of his Icarus Satellite at his Ice Palace, where she once again crosses paths with Bond and once more unsuccessfully attempts to kill Zao. Zao interrogates her, but she refuses to divulge any information. He leaves her to be disposed of by his henchman Mr. Kil (Lawrence Makoare), who straps her to a machine intended to kill her through the usage of industrial lasers. Bond rescues her and the two of them proceed to kill Mr. Kil with his own machine.

Upon admitting that she is an NSA agent to Bond, the two exchange relevant information and decide to work together. When Bond leaves to confront Graves, Jinx goes to warn MI6 operative Miranda Frost (Rosamund Pike) of an impending attack. However, unbeknownst to Jinx, Frost is the double agent who betrayed Bond in North Korea. Subduing Jinx, Frost locks her in Bond's suite to die as Graves melts his Ice Palace using his Icarus satellite's heat-ray. She is rescued for the second time by Bond after almost drowning in sub-zero temperatures of the flooded room. On the joint orders of Damian Falco (Michael Madsen) and M (Judi Dench), Jinx and Bond then infiltrate a North Korean airbase to assassinate Graves, who escapes. They board his plane via its landing gear and split up, with Jinx taking care of the plane's pilot while Bond takes on Graves. Jinx manages to take over the controls but is ambushed by a sword-wielding Frost, who forces her to switch the plane's controls over to its auto-pilot mode and removes her from the cockpit. Unbeknownst to either of them, the auto-pilot sends the plane hurtling into the solar beam projected by the Icarus satellite, causing the plane to begin to disintegrate, killing Graves. Jinx uses the chaos as an opportunity to overpower Frost and impale her on a knife. Jinx and Bond then manage to escape the burning and demolishing plane in a helicopter from the plane's cargo hold, in possession of Graves' diamonds. She and Bond then go to Cuba for a romantic night together.

Jinx later made an appearance in the 2012 video game 007 Legends, which "re-imagined" the events of Die Another Day with Daniel Craig's rendition of James Bond, voiced in the game by Timothy Watson. Eurocom, the game's developer, was unable to acquire the likeness of Halle Berry for inclusion in the game, so they used the likeness of actress Gabriela Montaraz instead, with the character being voiced by Madalena Alberto.

The scenes featuring Berry in Die Another Day in a bikini were shot in Cádiz. The location was reportedly cold and windy, and footage has been released of Berry wrapped in thick towels between takes to avoid catching a chill. Berry was injured during filming when debris from a smoke grenade flew into her eye. The debris was removed in a 30-minute operation which left Berry with an inflamed cornea.

== Future ==
After the film's release, MGM considered developing a spin-off focusing on the character which was scheduled for a November/December 2004 release. It was reported that MGM was keen to set up a separate franchise and to be a "Winter Olympics" alternative to James Bond; MGM had considered developing a spin-off film based on Michelle Yeoh's character, Wai Lin, in 1997's Tomorrow Never Dies. However, on October 26, 2003, Variety reported that MGM had "completely pulled the plug on this project", to the dismay of Barbara Broccoli and Michael G. Wilson of Eon Productions, who were reported to be "clearly furious" about the decision. MGM was reported to have paused development of the film in favour of rebooting the James Bond film series with Casino Royale (2006).

In 2017, Berry described having portrayed her character of Ginger "Angelica" Ale of Kingsman: The Golden Circle as "Jinx 2.0" in an interview with Screen Rant, stating that the character would come to more closely resemble Jinx in a future Kingsman film.

MGM executive Chris McTurk told The Daily Telegraph in 2022 that the decision to cancel the Jinx solo film was his: "I killed that. There had been other attempts to get a female-driven action effects movie off the ground that failed. My point was, it's a good idea in theory but if it fails, you're going to damage the whole franchise."

== Marketing ==
MGM and Eon Productions granted Mattel the license to sell a line of Barbie dolls based on the franchise around the time of the release of Die Another Day, with Mattel announcing that the Bond Barbie, based on Jinx, would be at her "stylish best", clad in evening dress and red shawl. Lindy Hemming created the dress, which is slashed to the thigh to reveal a telephone strapped to Barbie's leg. The doll was sold in a gift set, with Barbie's boyfriend Ken posing as Bond in a tuxedo designed by the Italian fashion house Brioni. Revlon also collaborated with the makers of Die Another Day to create a cosmetics line based around Jinx. The limited edition 007 Colour Collection was launched on 7 November 2002 to coincide with the film's release. The product names were loaded with puns and innuendo, with shades and textures ranging from the "warm" to "cool and frosted". Also in recent years Rittenhouse trading cards have featured Halle Berry as jinx autograph cards in certain boxes of 007 trading cards

== Reception ==
The scene in Die Another Day wherein Jinx emerges from the ocean in a bikini pays homage to Ursula Andress's character Honey Ryder from the first Bond film, Dr. No (1962). Lindy Hemming, the costume designer for Die Another Day, had insisted that Berry wear a bikini and hold a knife as a homage. Berry has described the scene as: "splashy", "exciting", "sexy", "provocative" and "it will keep me still out there after winning an Oscar." Although set in Cuba, the scene was shot in Cádiz, Spain.

In discussing her character, Berry described Jinx as "fashion-forward modern and the next step in the evolution of women in the Bond movies. She's more modern and not the classic villain." Jinx was voted the fourth toughest Bond girl on-screen of all time in an ITV poll.
