= HMS Chesterfield =

Three ships of the Royal Navy have borne the name HMS Chesterfield, after the town of Chesterfield, in Derbyshire:

- HMS Chesterfield (1745) was a 44-gun fifth rate launched in 1745. She foundered in 1762.
- HMS Chesterfield (1913) was a fleet messenger during WWI
- HMS Chesterfield (I28) was a Town-class destroyer, originally the US Navy's Clemson-class destroyer USS Welborn C. Wood. She was transferred to the Royal Navy in 1940 and was sold for scrapping in 1947.

== See also ==
- HMS Chester
