= Anthony Waye =

Anthony Waye is a British film producer, assistant director and production supervisor. He worked as an assistant director or executive, associate or line producer on a number of James Bond films, including For Your Eyes Only, Octopussy, A View to a Kill, The Living Daylights, GoldenEye, Tomorrow Never Dies and the 2006 version of Casino Royale.

Waye has over 70 screen credits and is best known for his involvement in the Bond franchise since Octopussy, until his retirement.
