= HMS Chester =

Four ships of the Royal Navy have borne the name HMS Chester, after the city of Chester:

- HMS Chester (1691) was a 48-gun fourth rate launched in 1691. She was captured by the French in 1707 at the Battle at The Lizard.
- HMS Chester (1708) was a 50-gun fourth rate launched in 1708. She was on harbour service from 1743 and was broken up in 1750.
- HMS Chester (1743) was a 50-gun fourth rate launched in 1743 and sold in 1767.
- HMS Chester (1915) was a Town-class light cruiser originally ordered for the Greek Navy in 1914 as Lambros Katsonis. She was taken over before her launch in 1915 and was sold in 1921.

There was also a planned Castle-class corvette named HMS Chester Castle. She was cancelled in 1943.

There was also an HMS Chester serving as a tank (water) vessel in the 1880s - saw service during the Egyptian campaign of 1882 when she was an "attendant" on HMS Alexandra; 21 men (her whole crew?) received the medal for Egypt serving aboard the ship.

== In fiction ==
A fictional HMS Chester appeared in the 1997 James Bond film Tomorrow Never Dies. The interior shots were filmed on the Type 23 frigate HMS Westminster. A model of a Type 23 was built for the exterior shots.

== See also ==
- HMS Chesterfield
