= Tomorrow Never Dies (video game) =

1999 video game

- North American box art
- Developer: Black Ops Entertainment
- Publishers: Electronic Arts; MGM Interactive
- Director: William Botti
- Producer: John Botti
- Designers: William Botti; Daryl Kimoto; Michael Guttentag; Flint Dille
- Programmers: An Nguyen; William Botti
- Artist: Kris Kilayko
- Writers: William Botti; Flint Dille
- Composers: Tommy Tallarico; Howard Ulyate; Sonic Mayhem; Todd Dennis
- Series: James Bond
- Platform: PlayStation
- Release: NA: 16 November 1999; UK: 25 November 1999
- Genres: Third-person shooter, stealth
- Mode: Single-player

Tomorrow Never Dies is a 1999 third-person shooter video game developed by Black Ops Entertainment and co-published by Electronic Arts and MGM Interactive for the PlayStation. It is based on the 1997 James Bond film Tomorrow Never Dies.

Development began in 1997, before the film's release. The game's storyline was originally meant to pick up after the events of the film, but this was scrapped following feedback from focus groups. The game's release was delayed several times, and additional levels and a multiplayer mode were removed during development.

The game was eventually released in November 1999, the same month that the next film in the Bond series, The World Is Not Enough, was released in cinemas. It is the first 007 game to be published by EA since acquiring the James Bond licence. It was released following the success of another James Bond game, GoldenEye 007 (1997). Critics were disappointed with Tomorrow Never Dies, believing that it fell short of the previous game, although the soundtrack was praised.

== Gameplay ==
Screenshot of a wounded Bond outside a Russian military outpost

Tomorrow Never Dies is a third-person shooter with elements of stealth gameplay. MI6 agent James Bond is the player character for most of the game, and Chinese agent Wai Lin is also playable in one level. The player can walk, run, sneak, sidestep, and roll. A variety of weapons can be used throughout the game, including a sniper rifle. The game switches to a first-person perspective when aiming weapons.

Clips from the film are shown after each level to advance the story. The game is played across ten levels, two of which include a skiing portion. Another level is played primarily as a driving game, with the player using an armed car to destroy enemy vehicles.

== Plot ==
The game's plot closely follows that of the film. Bond begins to cross the China–Russia border into a Russian radar base, which is intercepting messages delicate in subject. Using a laser designator, Bond targets the dish and a British jet flies over, dropping an air-to-surface missile. A helicopter arrives, and Bond kills the occupants and recovers a key. He uses the key to unlock a large gate and makes his escape on skis. Bond reaches the end of the run – a sheer cliff drop. Bond continues, and opens his Union Jack parachute.

Bond later lands in an arms bazaar. After taking photographs of military hardware, a British naval ship launches a BGM-109 Tomahawk to eliminate all potential threats and hardware. Bond realizes there are nuclear weapons at the Bazaar on a L-39 Albatros jet. After an intense firefight between Bond and Russian terrorists, he hijacks the jet and returns to MI6.

Bond is sent to investigate a man called Elliot Carver during a party in Hamburg, Germany after a British warship sank in the South China Sea, with all hands going down. Carver Media published the full story before MI6 received a full report, raising MI6's suspicions. During the party Bond meets his former lover, Paris, now Carver's wife, who slaps him. Carver arrives, and offers a "tour of the facilities". Bond follows, but is knocked out by a henchman. He wakes up in a room with a large 2-way mirror. He uses his laser-cufflinks to escape, then he destroys the central computer, allowing him to make his escape. He then makes his way to the press and engages in a firefight between Carver's guards.

He recovers Henry Gupta's GPS scrambler, which was used to lure the British navy into Chinese waters to try and spark an international incident. As the existing Chinese government is not receptive to giving Carver Media Group Network exclusive broadcast rights in China, Carver plans to start a war to eliminate the present government and replace it with politicians more supportive of his plans. Bond then escapes to the Hotel Atlantic, where Paris is being held prisoner. He arrives, and heads to the bar where he asks to see Paris; resulting in a shootout between Bond and the guards, who were working for Carver. Bond uses the elevator to get to Paris' apartment, where he meets Kaufman. Kaufman tries to kill Bond by using spinning razor discs and an AK-47. Bond kills Kaufman and helps Paris escape. They go to the underground garage, where Bond drives away in his BMW 7 Series.

MI6 has found the headquarters of Henry Gupta near the foothills of the Swiss Alps. The convoy of terrorist cars and trucks is heading to Gupta's Alpine hideout for an important meeting. Bond is sent to stop the convoy. Along the way, Bond meets Q, who gives him the BMW to stop the convoy. Bond successfully destroys the convoy with the BMW and drives away. Bond is then sent to a ski ridge in Hokkaido, Japan, to track down and kill chemical expert Satoshi Isagura, who is thought to be working for Elliot Carver after a nerve gas attack in Yokohama. Carver Media was also the first to report the story. Bond kills Isagura and is sent to Saigon.

Bond steals a data disk from Carver Media Tower in Saigon but is captured. Bond manages to escape with the data disk. The next night, Carver bribes the Saigon Military Police to kill Bond on sight, so MI6 pulls Bond out as the mission would be compromised were Bond to be seen or killed. Bond gives Wai Lin the data disk, and Wai Lin engages the Saigon Military Police in a gun battle with the police setting roadblocks and using fast-firing chain guns. She makes it back to her lab to find the location of Carter's stealth boat, hidden in Hạ Long Bay. On the stealth boat, Bond uses the boat's commlink to give MI6 its position. Wai Lin is kidnapped but is later freed by Bond after he kills Carver's right-hand man, Stamper. Wai Lin stops the engine while Bond shoots and kills Carver and stops the stolen nuclear missile from destroying Beijing. Bond and Wai Lin escape the stealth boat before it self-destructs.

== Development ==
Before the 1997 release of the film, MGM Interactive approached Black Ops Entertainment about developing a video game adaptation. Early development was already underway by the time that another James Bond game, GoldenEye, had been released. Black Ops CEO John Botti said that GoldenEye "raised the bar for video gaming in general, but our different platform and movie inspiration destined us to make a different game – one specifically for the PlayStation – with a similar but different Bond experience". The skiing and driving portions, along with the third-person perspective, were added to distinguish the game from GoldenEye, a first-person shooter which lacked such gameplay elements.

As work began on the game, Botti watched all of the James Bond films released up to that point. For the sake of gameplay, the game includes some differences from the film such as skiing, a feature that Black Ops was intent on adding. Scuba diving had also been planned. Programmer Will Botti began working on the game in November 1997, and was given a short period of 30 days to create a game engine for the skiing levels. Will Botti would become the project director in April 1998.

The game had a development period of approximately two years. It was originally intended as a continuation of the film with a story that would have picked up where the film left off. David Bishop, president of MGM Home Entertainment, said in June 1998, "We didn't see any benefit to following the script verbatim. We just felt we had more freedom in what we could bring the gaming world if we went outside the set script." However, focus groups were more interested in seeing familiar scenes from the film. The game's release was delayed several times, and was scheduled at one point for January 1999. Additional levels and a two-player mode were eventually removed. The latter feature was scrapped as the developers sought to focus on the single-player mode.

In late 1998, MGM partnered with Electronic Arts to co-publish games such as Tomorrow Never Dies. The game was completed on 29 October 1999, and released in North America on 16 November, and in the United Kingdom on 25 November.

The game includes voice-acting, although none of the film's actors reprised their roles. The game's musical score was composed by Tommy Tallarico, and was released separately as Tomorrow Never Dies The Original Soundtrack from the Videogame. It includes 16 tracks written for the game and a bonus track.

== Reception ==
Reception

Aggregate score
Aggregator	Score
GameRankings	62%

Review scores
Publication	Score
AllGame	2.5/5
CNET Gamecenter	5/10
Edge	2/10
Electronic Gaming Monthly	5.375/10 (Note: Two critics of Electronic Gaming Monthly gave the game each a score of 5/10, one gave it 6/10, and the other gave it 5.5/10.)
EP Daily	6.5/10
Famitsu	27/40
Game Informer	7.25/10
GameFan	70%
GameRevolution	D+
GameSpot	5.7/10
IGN	5/10
Next Generation	2/5
Official U.S. PlayStation Magazine	3.5/5
The Cincinnati Enquirer	2/4

According to the developer, the game sold over 3.2 million units worldwide. The game received a "Platinum" sales award from the Entertainment and Leisure Software Publishers Association (ELSPA), indicating sales of at least 300,000 units in the UK.

The game received mixed reviews according to the review aggregation website GameRankings. Adam Pavlacka of NextGen said of the game, "Take away the Bond license, and what's left is a very basic third-person shooter with little innovation." In Japan, where the game was ported and published by Electronic Arts Square on 10 February 2000, Famitsu gave it a score of 27 out of 40.

Following the success of GoldenEye, critics were disappointed with Tomorrow Never Dies, believing that it fell far short of the previous game. Rick Mears of GameFan wrote that after GoldenEye, "did we really ever expect anything to come close?" IGN's Douglass C. Perry wrote, "Despite wanting to avoid comparisons, it's nearly impossible for TND to shake the legacy of Goldeneye". Uncle Dust of GamePro wrote in one review, "Unfortunate comparisons to Goldeneye will probably occur, and to that Tomorrow Never Dies is an inferior game. But on its own TND gives you great Bond-style thrills in a less-than-polished package." (Note: GamePro gave the game two 3.5/5 scores for graphics and fun factor, 3/5 for sound, and 4.5/5 for control in one review.) In another GamePro review, Air Hendrix said, "You can't beat the marquee value of 007, so TND is worth renting to check its license to kill—even if there is no multiplayer action. Still, Tomorrow Never Dies is no GoldenEye, and gamers have come to expect much more from Bond." (Note: GamePro gave the game two 3.5/5 scores for graphics and fun factor, 4.5/5 for sound, and 2.5/5 for control in another review.) Scott Alan Marriott, writing for AllGame, felt that the game lacked the polishing that would be expected considering its delays. He concluded that the game "makes you appreciate GoldenEye that much more". Joe Fielder of GameSpot stated that unlike GoldenEye, each mission in Tomorrow Never Dies "ends on an anticlimactic note, making you think, 'Oh, it's over?'"

The game received comparisons to Syphon Filter, which some critics deemed superior. The artificial intelligence was criticized, as was the game's short length. Critics also complained of problems such as clipping and poor collision detection. Mears stated that walls "become translucent" and "bad guys appear out of nowhere". The game also received some criticism for its lack of multiplayer.

Marriott found the film-based clips to be short and of little value, while Johnny Liu of GameRevolution wrote that much of the film footage "just doesn't flow because of the game's choppy graphics".

The camera and controls were criticized as well. Justin Braxton-Brown, writing for The Cincinnati Enquirer, complained of Bond's slow running speed. He also stated that when Bond "attempts a 180-degree turn to face an adversary, gamers end up being shot in the back several times or spinning too far and being shot while trying to locate the enemy Bond just spun past". Perry stated that "even walking over simple power-ups can be a task". Marriott complained of Bond's limited moves, noting that he cannot jump, climb, or crawl.

Mears commended the game for its inclusion of skiing and driving portions, but also considered them "passable at best", while Marriott praised them. Perry found the car level to be uninspired and considered the skiing portions to be "the biggest area of missed opportunities". Liu stated that these portions of the game "aren't very well done and don't add much. They're really just there to proclaim variety".

The soundtrack was praised by critics, with Mears calling it the game's most "astounding" feature. IGN called it "a much better value than the horrible excuse for a PlayStation game that it's from".
