= Wai Lin =

Fictional character

- James Bond character
- Michelle Yeoh as Wai Lin in a promotional photo for Tomorrow Never Dies
- Portrayed by: Michelle Yeoh
- Voiced by: Larissa Murray (1999 video game)

In-universe information
- Gender: Female
- Affiliation: Chinese Intelligence
- Classification: Bond girl

Wai Lin (Chinese: 林慧; pinyin: Lín Huì) is a fictional character in the 1997 James Bond film Tomorrow Never Dies, portrayed by Michelle Yeoh.

Kin-Yan Szeto, author of The Martial Arts Cinema of the Chinese Diaspora: Ang Lee, John Woo, and Jackie Chan in Hollywood, wrote that the actress's "persona" was the "tough martial arts/action heroine [Yeoh] had established in Hong Kong cinema."

== Appearances ==
=== Film ===
Wai Lin (Michelle Yeoh) is a spy for the Ministry of State Security of the People's Republic of China with the rank of colonel and skilled in martial arts. She first encounters James Bond (Pierce Brosnan) when she is sent (under disguise as a Xinhua News Agency reporter) to investigate the disappearance of stealth material from a People's Liberation Army base which is connected to media mogul Elliot Carver (Jonathan Pryce), who plans to start a war between China and the United Kingdom. She later learns that Bond was sent by MI-6 to work on the same case. The two initially believe they have been ordered to kill each other, but eventually develop a wary mutual trust when they are both captured by Carver. Bond grows to respect her when she playfully, but firmly, rejects his attempts at seduction. Bond and Lin sneak about Carver's private ship and they work together to destroy the ship and disable a missile that was targeted at China. She and Bond then give in to the mutual attraction they had both been fighting during the mission.

Stephen Yiu-Wai Chu (朱耀偉), author of Lost in Transition: Hong Kong Culture in the Age of China, wrote that the film and its promotional materials "incessantly highlighted" the character's "Chineseness".

=== Other appearances ===
In the film's novelization by Raymond Benson, Wai Lin has an entire chapter devoted to introduce her character, detailing "her involvement with the Chinese Ministry of State Security, her training, her skills, and many other facets of her life that made her a real person. Her relationship with Bond is also much more realistic."

In the 1999 video game adaptation of the film, Wai Lin (voiced by Larissa Murray) is both a playable (Mission 9: Market District, Saigon) and a non-playable character (Mission 10: Stealth Boat, Hạ Long Bay).

A one/sixth scale action figure of her was released by Sideshow Collectibles in 2001.

In early scripts for Die Another Day, Wai Lin was to make a return, aiding Bond in Hong Kong. If this had happened, Wai Lin would have been the second Bond girl to appear in two films, following Sylvia Trench (Eunice Gayson) in Dr. No and From Russia with Love. However, this idea fell through so Wai Lin was replaced by Chinese intelligence agent Mr. Chang (played by Ho Yi) in the finished film.

== Reception ==
The character was generally well-received. Life named Wai Lin as the 11th best Bond girl of all time. In 2010, Entertainment Weekly ranked her as the seventh best Bond girl, calling the "savvy Chinese agent" one of the few "wom[e]n of colour to match wits with 007" and "the first one you could take seriously." In 2012, the International Business Times included Michelle Yeoh's Wai Lin among the top 10 "most stunning" Bond girls of all time. She was also included in the list of the 20 best Bond girls by Virgin Media, which called her "an equal match for Bond", as well as in a similar list by Triple M Melbourne.

MensXP.com ranked the "sexy and stern at the same time" Wai Lin as the seventh top Bond girl of all time; Fandomania ranked her as the second best Bond girl, stating that she was "the right type of Bond Girl at the right point in action cinema’s evolution." UGO noted that "Bond actually grows to respect the Chinese agent after she playfully but firmly spurns his romantic advances – one of the very few Bond Girls to pull that off!"
