= The Film and Television Charity =

British charitable organization

The Film and TV Charity
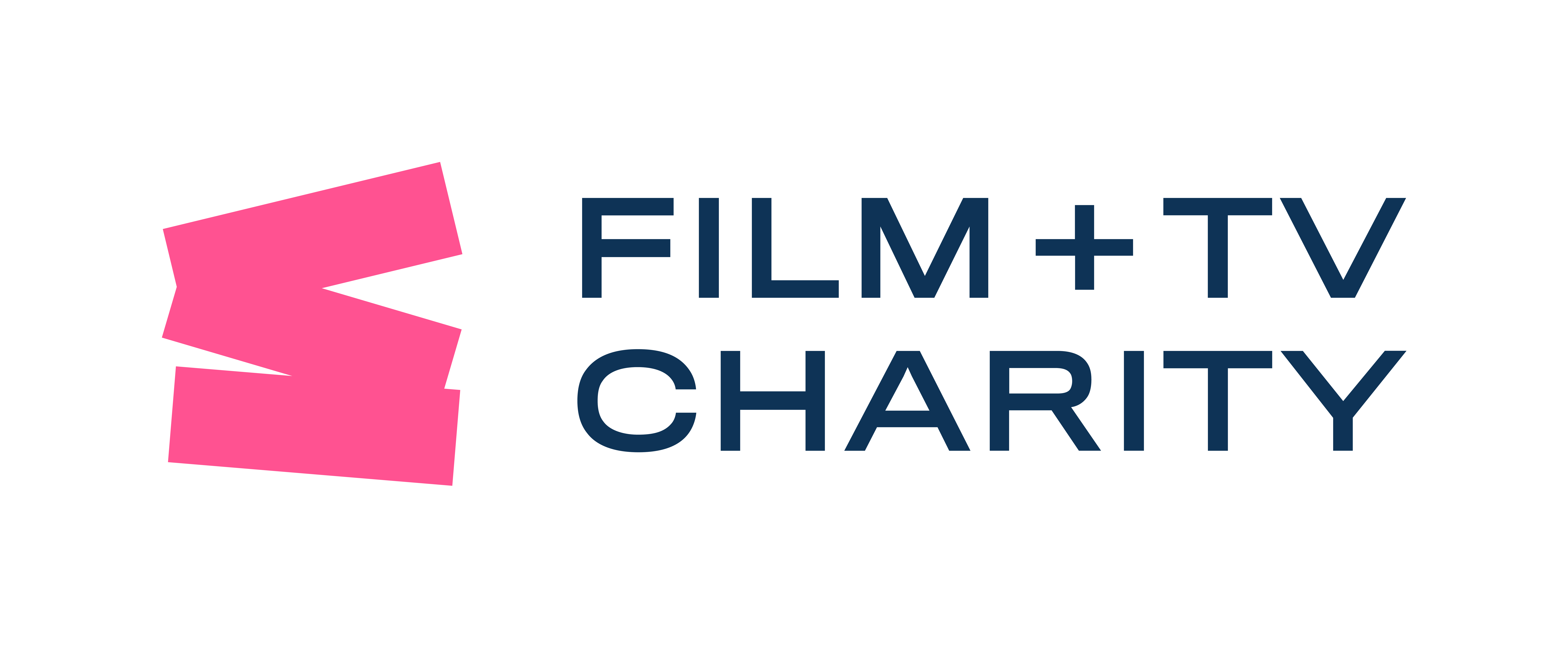
- Abbreviation: FTVC
- Formation: 1924, as Cinematograph Trade Benevolent Fund until 1964, then renamed Cinema and Television Benevolent Fund until 2017
- Type: Nonprofit organization
- Purpose: To support people who work in the Film, TV and Cinema industries
- Headquarters: 22 Golden Square, London W1F 9AD
- Region served: United Kingdom
- Official language: English
- CEO: Marcus Ryder
- Chair of Trustees: Claire Tavernier
- Staff: 40
- Website: https://filmtvcharity.org.uk

The Film and TV Charity, formerly the CTBF (Cinema and Television Benevolent Fund), is the leading UK charity for people who work in the film, cinema and television industries, whose careers cover all aspects of pre-production and beyond, from script to screen and in a variety of roles.

Operating out of its main office in London, their services are available across the whole of the UK.

The charity owns the trademark for the Royal Film Performance, an event that has previously been attended by Queen Elizabeth II and other members of the British Royal Family. The most recent Royal Film Performance was the global premiere of Ridley Scott's Gladiator II at the Odeon Luxe Leicester Square on 13 November 2024. The event was attended by King Charles III. Queen Camilla planned to attend with the King but ultimately cancelled due to a chest infection.

The charity runs a 24/7 Support Line. The support line is available to discuss legal queries, mental health and wellbeing, financial troubles, family issues, or bullying and discrimination.

== Campaigns ==
=== Better Mental Health/Looking Glass Survey ===
In 2019, the charity launched the Looking Glass Survey to explore the mental health conditions of the UK Film and TV industry. The results of this survey led the charity to create the Whole Picture Programme.

In 2021, the charity ran the Looking Glass Survey again and it showed there were still major problems within the industry in relation to work strain, bullying & harassment and Mental Health.

In 2022, the charity launched the third iteration of the Looking Glass Survey to measure the progress of work being done to tackle the Mental Health crisis facing the industry.

=== Diversity, equity and inclusion ===
In 2020, the charity added a new goal to their mission. As part of this process, the charity published two written reports focusing on racism in the industry.

=== Let's Reset ===
In 2021, the charity launched a year-long campaign titled "Let's Reset", supported by various major studios, production companies and industry bodies:

- Banijay
- BBC
- BBC Studios
- BFI
- Channel 4
- Channel 5
- The Walt Disney Company
- IMG
- ITV
- Amazon Prime Video
- SKY
- SKY Studios
- SONY pictures entertainment
- ViacomCBS
- WarnerMedia
- BAFTA
- BECTU
- British Screen Forum
- Coalition for Change
- Creative Industries Federation
- Directors UK
- Film Distributors Association
- Framestore
- Independent Cinema Office
- ScreenSkills
- Time's Up
- UK Screen Alliance
- Women in Film and TV

== Vice-patrons ==
Anne Bennett, Debbie Chalet, Derek Cooper, Stan Fishman, Sir Paul Fox, Lord Grade, Stephen Jaggs, Barry Jenkins, Ian Lewis, David McCall, David Murrell, Sir Alan Parker, Denise Parkinson, Lord Puttnam, Jeremy Thomas, Michael G. Wilson.
