= Tomorrow Never Dies =

1997 James Bond film by Roger Spottiswoode

- Original British theatrical release poster by Keith Hamshere and George Whitear
- Directed by: Roger Spottiswoode
- Written by: Bruce Feirstein
- Based on: James Bond by Ian Fleming
- Produced by: Michael G. Wilson; Barbara Broccoli
- Starring: Pierce Brosnan; Jonathan Pryce; Michelle Yeoh; Teri Hatcher; Joe Don Baker; Judi Dench
- Cinematography: Robert Elswit
- Edited by: Michel Arcand; Dominique Fortin
- Music by: David Arnold
- Production companies: United Artists; Eon Productions Limited
- Distributed by: MGM Distribution Co. (United States and Canada); United International Pictures (International)
- Release dates: 9 December 1997 (London premiere); 12 December 1997 (United Kingdom); 19 December 1997 (United States)
- Running time: 119 minutes
- Countries: United Kingdom; United States
- Language: English
- Budget: $110 million
- Box office: $339.5 million

Tomorrow Never Dies is a 1997 spy film, the eighteenth in the James Bond series produced by Eon Productions and the second to star Pierce Brosnan as fictional MI6 agent James Bond. Directed by Roger Spottiswoode from a screenplay by Bruce Feirstein, it follows Bond as he seeks to stop Elliot Carver (Jonathan Pryce), a powerful media tycoon with a God complex, from engineering a third world war.

The film was produced by Michael G. Wilson and Barbara Broccoli. It was the first Bond film made after the death of producer Albert R. Broccoli (to whom it pays tribute in the end credits) and the last released under the United Artists label. Filming locations included France, Thailand, Germany, Mexico and the United Kingdom.

Tomorrow Never Dies performed well at the box office, grossing over $339 million worldwide, becoming the fourth-highest-grossing film of 1997 and earning a Golden Globe nomination. Despite mixed reviews upon release, retrospectives on the film highlight its prescience at predicting the prevalence and dangers of fake news. While its performance at the U.S. box office surpassed that of its predecessor GoldenEye, it was the only one of Brosnan's Bond films not to open at No. 1 at the box office, as it opened the same day as Titanic, and finished at No. 2 that week. It was followed by The World Is Not Enough in 1999.

== Plot ==
MI6 sends James Bond into the field to scout a terrorist arms bazaar on the Russian border. Despite M's insistence on letting 007 finish his mission, Royal Navy Rear Admiral Roebuck orders the frigate HMS Chester to fire a Harpoon missile at the bazaar. Bond discovers two nuclear torpedoes mounted on an L-39 Albatros trainer jet; with the missile out of range to be aborted, Bond is forced to pilot the L-39 away seconds before the bazaar is destroyed, dogfighting with another L-39 before being able to return to base.

Media baron Elliot Carver starts his plans to use an encoder obtained at the bazaar by his associate, cyberterrorist Henry Gupta, to provoke war between China and the UK. Meaconing the GPS signal using the encoder, Gupta sends the frigate HMS Devonshire off course into Chinese-occupied waters in the South China Sea, where Carver's stealth ship, commanded by Carver's chief enforcer Stamper, ambushes and sinks it with a "sea vac drill" torpedo. Carver's henchmen steal one of Devonshire's missiles and shoot down a Chinese MiG fighter jet investigating the scene. Stamper kills the Devonshire's survivors with weaponry loaded with Chinese ammunition. The British Minister of Defence orders Roebuck to deploy the fleet to investigate the sinking of the frigate, and demands retaliation, leaving M only 48 hours to investigate its sinking and avert a war.

M sends Bond to investigate Carver and his company, CMGN, after Carver released news articles about the crisis hours before MI6 had become aware of it. Bond travels to Hamburg to seduce Carver's wife, Paris (an ex-girlfriend of Bond), to get information that would help him enter CMGN headquarters. He defeats Stamper's men and cuts Carver off the air during the inaugural broadcast of his satellite network. Carver discovers the truth about Paris and Bond and orders both of them killed. Bond and Paris reconcile in Bond's hotel room, and she provides him with information to infiltrate Carver's newspaper facility. Bond steals the GPS encoder from Gupta's office at the facility. Meanwhile, Paris is killed by Carver's assassin and Stamper's mentor, Dr. Kaufman. After Bond returns to find Paris' body, Kaufman holds him at gunpoint. Bond is able to kill Kaufman and escape his henchmen through a multistory car park in his Q-branch vehicle, a BMW 750iL with remote control via his Ericsson cell phone.

At a U.S. Air Force base in Okinawa, Bond teams with his CIA contact Jack Wade and meets GPS technician Dr. Dave Greenwalt. Bond understands that the encoder had been tampered with, and goes to the South China Sea to investigate the wreck. He and Wai Lin, a Chinese Ministry of State Security agent on the same case, explore the sunken ship and discover one of its cruise missiles missing, but after reaching the surface they are captured by Stamper and taken to the CMGN tower in Saigon. They soon escape and contact the Royal Navy and the People's Liberation Army Air Force to explain Carver's scheme. Carver plans to destroy most of the Chinese government with the stolen missile, allowing a corrupt Chinese army general named Chang to assume power and negotiate a truce between Britain and China, both of which will have begun a naval war. Once the conflict is over, Carver will be given exclusive broadcasting rights in China for the next century, which would then allow his broadcasting network to be completely global.

Bond and Wai Lin board Carver's stealth ship to prevent him from firing the missile at Beijing. Wai Lin is captured, forcing Bond to devise a second plan. Bond captures Gupta to use as his own hostage, but Carver kills Gupta, claiming he has "outlived his contract". Bond detonates a grenade in the hull, damaging the ship, thus rendering it visible to radar and vulnerable to a subsequent Royal Navy attack. While Wai Lin disables the engines, she is recaptured by Stamper. Bond kills Carver with his own drill and attempts to destroy the warhead with detonators, but Stamper attacks him, sending a chained Wai Lin into the water. Bond traps Stamper in the missile firing mechanism and saves Wai Lin as the missile explodes, destroying the ship and killing Stamper. Bond and Wai Lin kiss amidst the wreckage as HMS Bedford searches for them.

== Cast ==
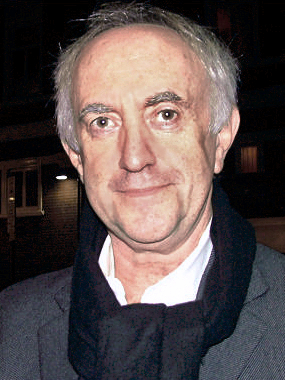
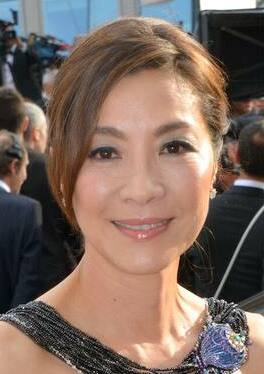
Pierce Brosnan (left) in 2017, Jonathan Pryce (in 2007), and Michelle Yeoh (in 2017)
- Pierce Brosnan as James Bond, MI6 agent 007.
- Jonathan Pryce as Elliot Carver, a dangerously amoral and egomaniacal media tycoon who aspires to trigger a third world war between China and the West.
- Michelle Yeoh as Wai Lin, a skilled agent of the Chinese Ministry of State Security, Bond's ally.
- Teri Hatcher as Paris Carver, a former girlfriend of Bond who is now Carver's trophy wife.
- Götz Otto as Richard Stamper, Carver's henchman, skilled in the art of Chakra torture.
- Ricky Jay as Henry Gupta, an American "techno-terrorist" in the employ of Carver.
- Joe Don Baker as Jack Wade, Bond's CIA liaison.
- Vincent Schiavelli as Dr. Kaufman, a professor of forensic medicine and professional assassin used by Elliot Carver, as well as Stamper's mentor.
- Judi Dench as M, the head of MI6.
- Desmond Llewelyn as Q, the head of MI6 Q-Branch.
- Samantha Bond as Miss Moneypenny, M's secretary.
- Colin Salmon as Charles Robinson, M's deputy chief of staff.
- Geoffrey Palmer as Rear Admiral Roebuck, a Royal Navy officer.

Other actors in the film include Julian Fellowes as the British Minister of Defence; Cecilie Thomsen as Inga Bergstrom, an Oxford professor Bond has an affair with; Nina Young as Tamara Steel, a news presenter for Carver Media Group; Colin Stinton as Dr. Dave Greenwalt, an American Air Force expert on GPS; Michael Byrne as Admiral Kelly, commander of the Royal Navy task force sent to the South China Sea; Philip Kwok as General Chang, a corrupt Chinese military official who is helping Carver start a war between China and Britain; Terence Rigby as Russian Army General Bukharin; Christopher Bowen as HMS Devonshire Commander Richard Day; Gerard Butler and Julian Rhind-Tutt as Devonshire crewmen; Pip Torrens as captain of the naval task force's flagship HMS Bedford, Hugh Bonneville, Brendan Coyle, and Jason Watkins as Bedford crewmen; and Daphne Deckers as a Carver Media Group PR representative. Producer Michael G. Wilson has an uncredited cameo on a video call as Tom Wallace, one of Carver's employees whom he orders to blackmail the U.S. President, while Rolf Saxon appears as Phillip Jones, another of Carver's employees in the same scene.

== Production ==
Bond 18 was greenlit after the positive public reception to the teaser trailer for GoldenEye in May 1995. Following GoldenEye's success in reviving the Bond series, there was pressure to recreate that success in the next production. This pressure came from MGM which, along with its new owner, billionaire Kirk Kerkorian, wanted the film's release to coincide with their public stock offering. Co-producer Michael G. Wilson commented: "You realize that there's a huge audience and I guess you don't want to come out with a film that's going to somehow disappoint them."

It was the first Bond film made after the death of Albert R. Broccoli, who had been involved with the series' production since its inception. Not only was the film dedicated to his memory, but the opening credits were revised to begin with "Albert R Broccoli’s Eon Productions Limited presents", thus keeping Broccoli’s name in the title sequence.

The rush to complete the film drove the budget to $110 million. The producers were unable to persuade GoldenEye director Martin Campbell to return, as he had chosen to direct The Mask of Zorro instead; his agent said, "Martin just didn't want to do two Bond films in a row." Roger Spottiswoode was chosen to direct in September 1996; he had previously offered to direct GoldenEye when Timothy Dalton was still cast as Bond.

=== Writing ===
Initial writers included John Cork, Richard Smith, and novelist Donald E. Westlake. In 1995, Westlake wrote two story treatments in collaboration with Wilson, both of which featured a villain who planned to destroy Hong Kong with explosives on the eve of the city's July 1997 transfer of sovereignty to China. Westlake used some of his ideas for a novel he completed the next year, though it was not published until 2017 under the title Forever and a Death. Director Spottiswoode said that, in January 1997, MGM had a script also focused on the Hong Kong handover, but it could not be used for a film opening at the end of the year, so they had to start "almost from scratch at T-minus zero!"

Bruce Feirstein, who worked on GoldenEye, wrote the initial script. He claimed that his inspiration was his own experience working with journalism and viewing both Sky News and CNN's 24-hour news coverage of the Gulf War, stating that he aimed to "write something that was grounded in a nightmare of reality." The script was handed to Spottiswoode, who then gathered seven Hollywood screenwriters in London to brainstorm, eventually choosing Nicholas Meyer to do rewrites. The script was also worked on by Dan Petrie Jr. and David Campbell Wilson before Feirstein was brought back for a final polish. Although Feirstein retained sole writing credit in the film and publicity materials, Meyer, Petrie and Wilson were given credit with Feirstein on the title page of the film's novelization by Raymond Benson. While many reviewers compared Elliot Carver to Rupert Murdoch, Feirstein based the character on Robert Maxwell, with Carver's reported death bearing similarities to that of Maxwell's; that is, "Missing, presumed drowned, while on a cruise aboard his luxury yacht," as stated by M at the end of the film. However, Spottiswoode himself said in a 2004 interview that "Carver is Rupert Murdoch".

In the original script when Bond is set to parachute into Vietnam he is told by a CIA agent that "You know what will happen. It will be war. And maybe this time, maybe we’ll win". The Pentagon was embarrassed by this line and it was subsequently removed.

Wilson said, "We didn't have a script that was ready to shoot on the first day of filming", while Pierce Brosnan said, "We had a script that was not functioning in certain areas."

The title was inspired by the Beatles' song "Tomorrow Never Knows". The eventual title came about by accident. One of the potential titles was Tomorrow Never Lies (referring to the Tomorrow newspaper in the plot), and this was faxed to MGM. However, due to a misunderstanding by the fax recipient, it became Tomorrow Never Dies, a title MGM found so attractive that they insisted on using it. The title was the first not to have any relation to Fleming's life or work.

=== Casting ===
Teri Hatcher was three months pregnant when shooting started, although her publicist stated the pregnancy did not affect the production schedule. In 2025, Hatcher highlighted that she loves the franchise and loves being a Bond girl. Actress Sela Ward auditioned for the role; the producers reportedly said they wanted her "but ten years younger". Hatcher, at 32, was seven years Ward's junior, and playing Lois Lane on the television show Lois & Clark: The New Adventures of Superman, where she was voted the "Sexiest Woman on Television" by readers of TV Guide the previous year. Brosnan also screen-tested with Italian Monica Bellucci, but the studio maintained that the role could be given only to an American actress. Brosnan remarked: "The fools said no." Daphne Deckers, who portrays the PR woman, also confirms that she saw Bellucci the same day she herself auditioned. Bellucci subsequently had a role in the 24th Bond film, Spectre.

The role of Elliot Carver was initially offered to Anthony Hopkins (who was also offered a role in GoldenEye), but he declined in favor of The Mask of Zorro.

Natasha Henstridge was rumoured as cast in the lead Bond Girl role, but eventually, Yeoh was confirmed. Brosnan was impressed, describing her as a "wonderful actress" who was "serious and committed about her work". She reportedly wanted to perform her own stunts, but was prevented because director Spottiswoode ruled it too dangerous and prohibited by insurance restrictions.

When Götz Otto was called in for casting, his hair had been cropped short for a television role. He was given 20 seconds to introduce himself, but did it in five: "I'm big, I'm bad, and I'm German."

=== Filming ===
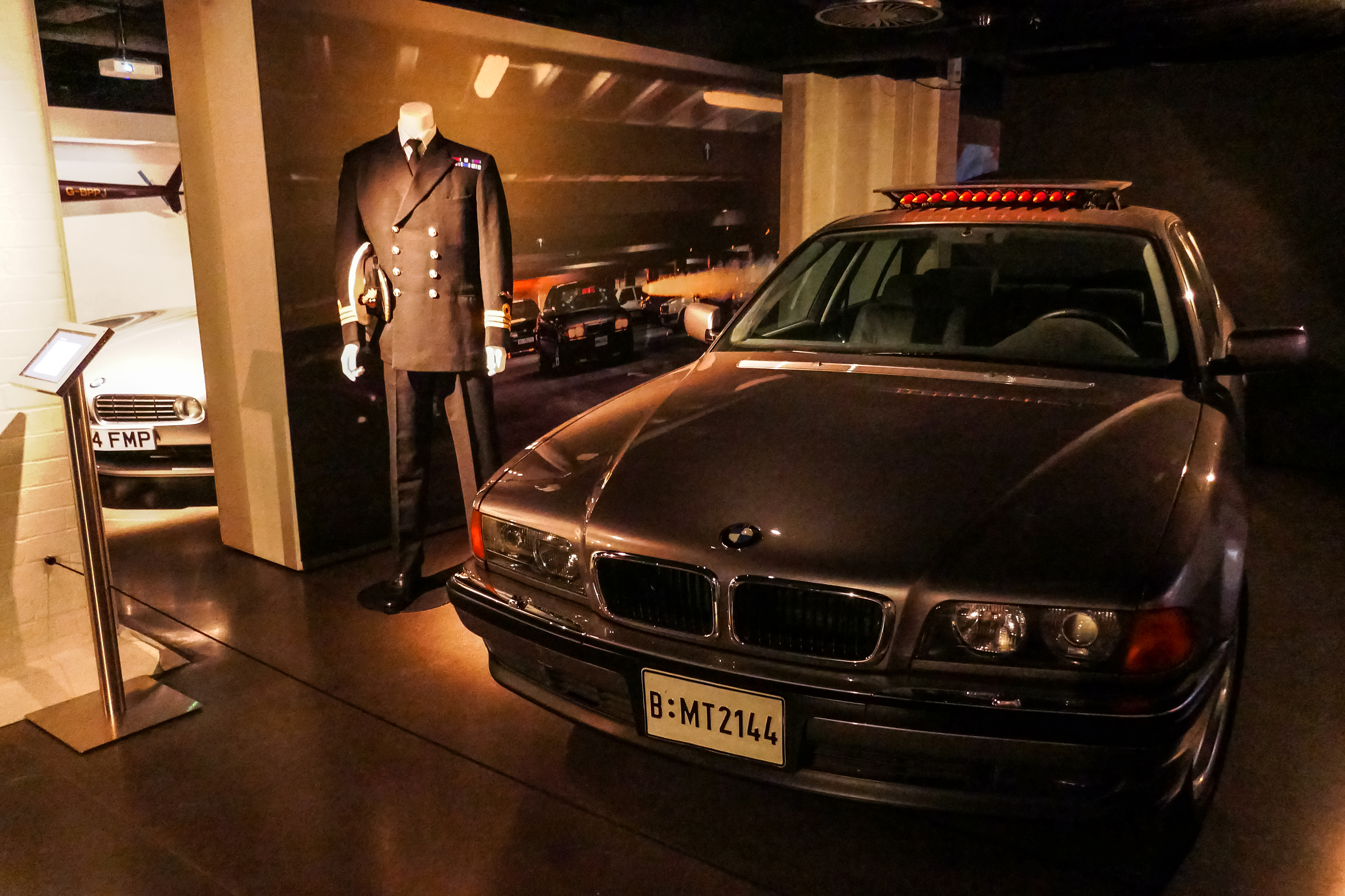
A modified BMW 7 Series car with a steering wheel on the back seat, seen at an exhibition at Museum Industriekultur, Nuremberg.

With Vic Armstrong directing the second unit, filming of the $11 million 4-minute pre-title sequence began on 18 January 1997 at Peyresourde-Balatestas Airport, Peyragudes in the French Pyrenees. The plane Bond is seen to purloin in the movie was a Czech-built Aero Vodochody L-39ZO Albatros weapons jet trainer, supplied by a British company and flown by stunt pilots Tony "Taff" Smith and Mark Hanna. After completing work in France, the second unit moved on to Portsmouth to film the scenes where the Royal Navy prepares to engage the Chinese, with HMS Westminster (F237) standing in for the various fictional Type 23 Frigates in the story. The main unit began filming on 1 April. They were unable to use Leavesden Studios, which they had constructed from an abandoned Rolls-Royce factory for GoldenEye, as George Lucas was using it for Star Wars: Episode I – The Phantom Menace, so instead they constructed sound stages in another derelict industrial site nearby. They also used the 007 Stage at Pinewood Studios, the usual site for the Bond films since its inception, making it the first Bond film since The Living Daylights that was filmed there, as well as Elstree Studios. The scene at the "U.S. Air Base in the South China Sea" where Bond hands over the GPS encoder was actually filmed in the area known as Blue Section at RAF Lakenheath. The sea landing used the vast tank built for Titanic in Rosarito, Baja California. The MH-53J in the film was from the US Air Force's 352d Special Operations Group at RAF Mildenhall.

Some scenes were planned to be filmed on location in Ho Chi Minh City, and the production had been granted a visa. It would have been the first major film to be shot in Vietnam since the Vietnam War. However, the visa was later rescinded by Vietnamese Prime Minister Võ Văn Kiệt two months after planning had begun, forcing filming to move to Bangkok. Bond spokesman Gordon Arnell claimed the Vietnamese were unhappy with crew and equipment needed for pyrotechnics, with a Vietnamese official saying it was due to "many complicated reasons". Anthony Waye says he believed the decision was caused after Vietnam's Communist government had viewed the opening credits of GoldenEye, which featured "semi-naked ladies smashing up hammer-and-sickle emblems with sledgehammers, illustrating the fall of communism." Two locations from previous Bond films were used: Brosnan and Hatcher's love scene was filmed at Stoke Park, which had been featured in Goldfinger, and the bay where they search for Carver's stealth boat is Phang Nga Bay, previously used for The Man with the Golden Gun.

The exterior of Elliot Carver's CMGN Hamburg HQ was filmed at the IBM Building in Bedfont Lakes, Feltham, whilst Harmsworth Quays Printers Ltd in Surrey Quays, Rotherhithe, doubled for the interior of the Hamburg print facility.

Spottiswoode tried to innovate in the action scenes. Since the director felt that after the tank chase in GoldenEye he could not use a bigger vehicle, a scene with Bond and Wai Lin on a BMW motorcycle was created. Another innovation was the remote-controlled car, which had no visible driver – an effect achieved by adapting a BMW 750i to put the steering wheel on the back seat. The car chase sequence with the 750i took three weeks to film, with Brent Cross car park being used to simulate Hamburg, although the final leap was filmed on location. A stunt involving setting fire to three vehicles produced more smoke than anticipated, causing a member of the public to call the fire brigade. The upwards camera angle filming the HALO jump created the illusion of having the stuntman opening its parachute close to the water.

Spottiswoode did not return to direct the next film; he said the producers asked him, but he was too tired. Brosnan and Hatcher were reported to have feuded briefly during filming due to her arriving late onto the set one day. The matter was quickly resolved, though, and Brosnan apologised to Hatcher after realising she was pregnant and was late for that reason.

Tomorrow Never Dies marked the first appearance of the Walther P99 as Bond's pistol. It replaced the Walther PPK that the character had carried in every Eon Bond film since Dr. No in 1962, with the exception of Moonraker in which Bond was not seen with a pistol. Walther wanted to debut its new firearm in a Bond film, which had been one of its most visible endorsers. Previously, the P5 was introduced in Octopussy. Bond would use the P99 until Daniel Craig reverted to the PPK as 007 in Quantum of Solace in 2008.

=== Music ===
Prolific composer John Barry was in talks to return to the James Bond films for the first time in a decade but could not reach an agreement over his salary, according to his then-agent Richard Kraft. Barbara Broccoli subsequently chose David Arnold to score Tomorrow Never Dies on a recommendation from Barry. Arnold had come to Barry's attention through his successful cover interpretations in Shaken and Stirred: The David Arnold James Bond Project, which featured major artists performing the former James Bond title songs in new arrangements. Arnold said that his score aimed for "a classic sound but [with] a modern approach", combining techno music with a recognisably Barry-inspired "classic Bond" sound—notably Arnold borrowed from Barry's score for From Russia with Love. The score was done across a period of six months, with Arnold writing music and revising previous pieces as he received edited footage of the film. The music for the indoor car chase sequence was co-written with the band Propellerheads, who had worked with Arnold on Shaken and Stirred. The soundtrack was well received by critics with Christian Clemmensen of Filmtracks describing it as "an excellent tribute to the entire series of Bond score".

At first, the theme song was to be written by Arnold himself, with the help of lyricist Don Black and singer-songwriter David McAlmont, who recorded the demo. However, MGM wanted a more popular artist, and invited various singers to write songs before one was picked through a competitive process. There were around twelve submissions, including songs from Swan Lee, Pulp, Saint Etienne, Marc Almond, and Sheryl Crow. Crow's song was chosen for the main titles. Arnold's composition, "Surrender", performed by k.d. lang, was still used for the end titles, and features the same prominent melodic motif as the film's score. This was the fourth Bond film to have different opening and closing songs. Pulp's effort was re-titled as "Tomorrow Never Lies" and appeared as a b-side on their 1997 single "Help The Aged". The original "Tomorrow Never Dies" rough mix of the song was eventually released on the bonus disc of the This Is Hardcore deluxe edition in 2006. Moby created a remake of the "James Bond Theme" to be used for the movie. Two different versions of the soundtrack album were released, the first featuring only music from the first half of the film, and the second rectifying this but cutting several tracks, including the songs, to make room for the missing score tracks. In 2022 La La Land Records releases a two-disc expanded and limited edition of the complete score by Arnold.

== Release ==
The film had a World Charity Premiere at The Odeon Leicester Square, on 9 December 1997; this was followed by an after premiere party at Bedford Square, home of original Ian Fleming publisher, Jonathan Cape. The film went into general release in the UK and Ireland on 12 December and in most other countries during the following week. It opened in second place in the United States and Canada, grossing $25.1 million behind Titanic, which would become the highest-grossing film of all time up to that point. Tomorrow Never Dies ultimately grossed $339.5 million worldwide, although it did not surpass its predecessor GoldenEye, which had earned over $356 million.

== Reception ==
=== Critical reaction ===
Rotten Tomatoes gave the film a 58% rating based on 92 reviews, with an average rating of 6.1/10. The website's consensus states: "A competent, if sometimes by-the-numbers entry to the 007 franchise, Tomorrow Never Dies may not boast the most original plot but its action sequences are genuinely thrilling." On Metacritic, the film has a score of 52 based on 38 reviews, indicating "mixed or average reviews". Audiences polled by CinemaScore gave the film an average grade of "A−" on an A+ to F scale.

In the Chicago Sun-Times, Roger Ebert gave the film three out of four stars, writing: "Tomorrow Never Dies gets the job done, sometimes excitingly, often with style" with the villain "slightly more contemporary and plausible than usual", bringing "some subtler-than-usual satire into the film". Gene Siskel of the Chicago Tribune wrote it was the "first James Bond film I've liked in many a year", most notably favoring the character Elliot Carver, which he felt added "contemporary writing to the Bond series, and that is most welcome." On his website ReelViews, James Berardinelli described it as "the best Bond film in many years" and said Brosnan "inhabits his character with a suave confidence that is very like Connery's." Kenneth Turan, writing for the Los Angeles Times, thought that a lot of Tomorrow Never Dies had a "stodgy, been-there feeling", with little change from previous films. Janet Maslin of The New York Times summarized the film as "a generic action event that it could be any old summer blockbuster, except that its hero is chronically overdressed." Charles Taylor wrote for Salon that the film was "a flat, impersonal affair".

The title song sung by Sheryl Crow was nominated for a Golden Globe for Best Original Song and a Grammy Award for Best Song Written Specifically for a Motion Picture or for Television. The film received four nominations for Saturn Awards, with Brosnan winning for Best Actor. It also won a MPSE Golden Reel Award for "Best Sound Editing – Foreign Feature" and a BMI Film Music Award.

The original UK release received various cuts in scenes of violence and martial arts weaponry, to reduce the impact of sound effects and to receive a more box-office-friendly 12 certificate. Further cuts were made to the video/DVD release to retain this rating. These edits were restored for the Ultimate Edition DVD release in the UK, which was consequently upgraded to a 15 certificate. However, upon the release of the Blu-ray in 2012, it was rated back down to a 12 uncut.

=== Retrospective reviews ===
In the wake of its original release, critics and audiences have praised Tomorrow Never Dies for its prescience. The website Den of Geek, on the film's twentieth anniversary, observed of the film's plot: "It's an improbable set-up which was likely intended as a satire of Murdoch's unaccountable media empire, but the risks of such technological manipulation have since proved to be frighteningly plausible." Den of Geek also highlights that "technology wasn't the only modern danger to be pre-empted by Tomorrow Never Dies—it also offers a revealing peek into the confused state of the British national psyche, which might help to explain the country's ongoing Brexit debates."

Similarly, HeadStuff highlighted its relevance in 2020, noting that "some modern critics argue that Carver's emphasis on traditional journalism date the film and that if the Internet existed to such an extent as it does twenty years later, his plan would be instantly foiled... not really sure those people have been following current events over the past two years."

The American Film Institute nominated the film in 2001 for AFI's 100 Years of Thrills and David Arnold's score in 2005 for AFI's 100 Years of Film Scores.

== Appearances in other media ==
Tomorrow Never Dies was the first of three Bond films to be adapted into books by then-current Bond novelist Raymond Benson. Benson's version is expanded from the screenplay including additional scenes with Wai Lin and other supporting characters not in the film. The novel traces Carver's background as the son of media mogul Lord Roverman, whom Carver blackmails into suicide, later taking over his business. The novel also attempts to merge Benson's series with the films, particularly by continuing a middle-of-the-road approach to John Gardner's continuity. Notably it includes a reference to the film version of You Only Live Twice where he states that Bond was lying to Miss Moneypenny when he said he had taken a course in Asian languages. Tomorrow Never Dies also mentions Felix Leiter, although it states that Leiter had worked for Pinkertons Detective Agency, which is thus exclusive to the literary series. Subsequent Bond novels by Benson were affected by Tomorrow Never Dies, specifically Bond's weapon of choice being changed from the Walther PPK to the Walther P99. Benson said in an interview that he felt Tomorrow Never Dies was the best of the three novelisations he wrote.

The film was also adapted into a third-person shooter PlayStation video game, Tomorrow Never Dies. The game was developed by Black Ops and published by Electronic Arts on 16 November 1999. Game Revolution described it as "really just an empty and shallow game", and IGN said it was "mediocre".

== See also ==
- Outline of James Bond
- Sea Shadow (IX-529), the boat that inspired the design of Carver's stealth boat

== Bibliography ==
- Field, Matthew; Chowdhury, Ajay (2015). Some Kind of Hero: The Remarkable Story of the James Bond Films. The History Press. ISBN 978-0-7509-6421-0. OCLC 930556527.
